= History of Somalia (1991–2006) =

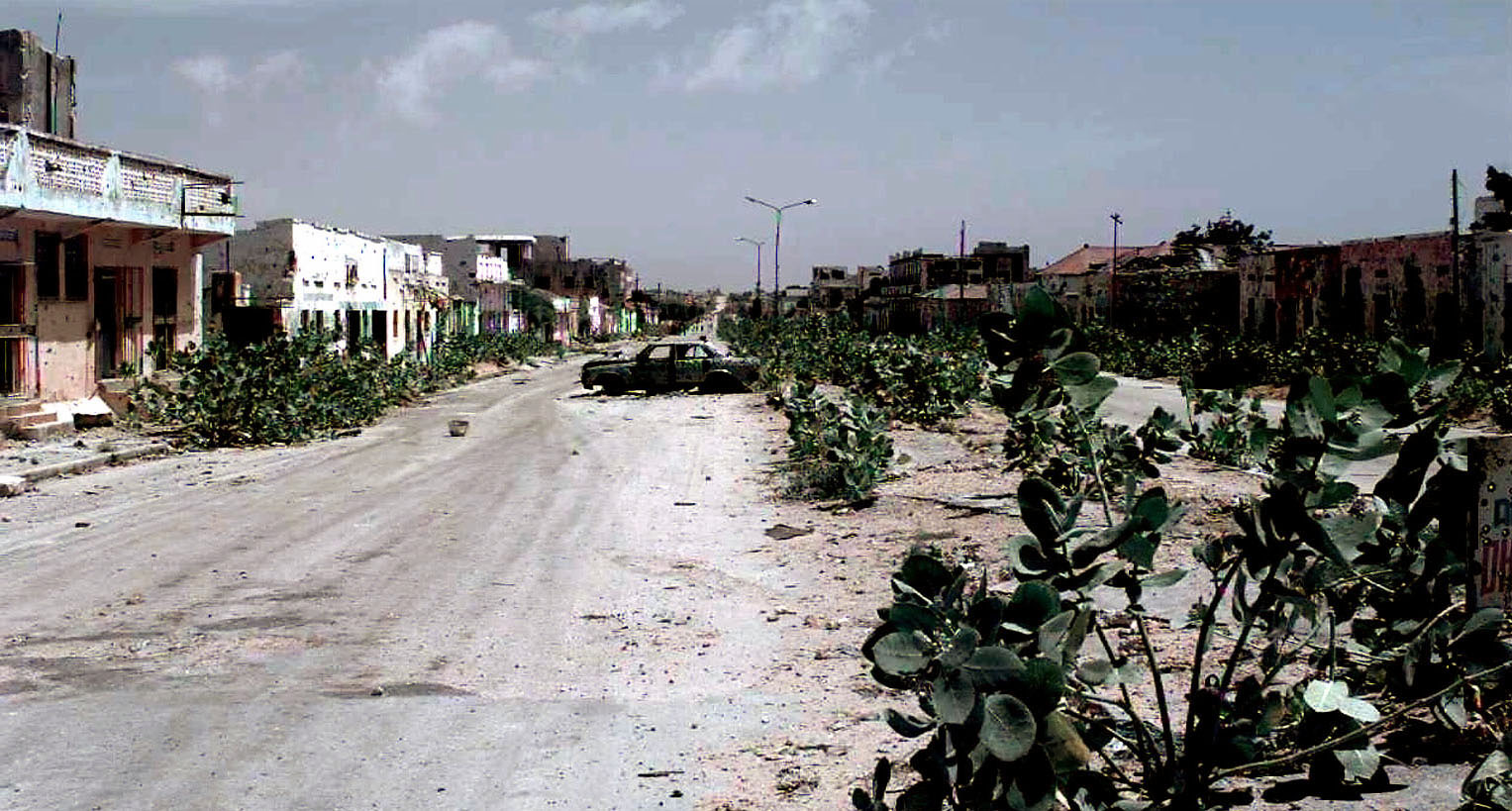
An abandoned Mogadishu street in 1993, shortly after the fall of the Siad Barre government

Between the fall of Siad Barre's government in January 1991 and the establishment of the Transitional National Government in 2006 (succeeded by the Transitional Federal Government), there was no central government in Somalia. Large areas of the country such as Puntland and Galmudug were internationally unrecognized and administered as autonomous regions of Somalia, while forces in the northwest declared the Republic of Somaliland. The remaining areas, including the capital Mogadishu, were divided into smaller territories ruled by competing faction leaders. During this period, Somalia has been cited as a real-world example of a stateless society and a country with no formal legal system.

The Transitional Federal Government, formed in 2004, was recognized as the central government of Somalia. Before December 2006, the TFG controlled only the town of Baidoa, the sixth largest city. The intervention of Ethiopian government forces following the rise of the Islamic Courts Union, culminating in the latter's defeat in the Battle of Baidoa, allowed the TFG to expand its control under the protection of Ethiopian troops. The TFG was at the time not able to effectively collect taxes, had no notable finances or real power base, and struggled to exert control over Mogadishu following an attempted move in late December 2006. However, the TFG later succeeded in capturing most of Somalia from insurgents, but struggled to cement its control and establish law and order.

Benjamin Powell argued that statelessness led to more order and less chaos than had the previous state, and economist Alex Tabarrok claimed that Somalia in its stateless period provided a "unique test of the theory of anarchy", in some aspects resembling that espoused by anarcho-capitalists such as David D. Friedman and Murray Rothbard. However, this is disputed by anarchists and anarcho-capitalists, who contend it is not anarchy, but merely chaos, perhaps resulting from unequal distribution of power and meddling by neighbors and developed nations like the United States. The Somali experience since the collapse of the state, and especially the failure of international intervention, has offered a clear challenge to elements of conventional economic, political and social order theory and the very premises under which Western diplomacy and development agencies operate. According to anthropologist Peter D. Little, it challenges "assumptions about the role of states in maintaining order and services".

== The rule of law ==
Where things went wrong is when we decided, the U.N. decided, that somehow we could tell the Somalis how they should live with each other. At that point we lost the bubble…

— U.S. General Colin Powell, 1995

Following the downfall of the Siad Barre government, there was effectively no formal centralized government law in Somalia. While some urban areas such as Mogadishu had private police forces, many Somalis simply returned to the traditional clan-based legal structures for local governance and dispute resolution. Michael Maren's book The Road to Hell (1997) noted how the clan structure baffled many Americans, Canadians and Europeans who were in Somalia for government aid, military or charitable organizations. International visitors tended to assume society was organized top down from high-ranking government leaders, Maren noted, and struggled to understand a more bottom-up system based on high trust for immediate and extended families and less trust for government authorities. Somalis were described in The New York Times as "legendary individualists", and also have been thought of as particularly receptive to anarchist forms of social organization. Social scientists have identified the pastoralist way of life that a great many Somalis lead as in tension with formal statist legal systems. Political loyalties are based on clan and region rather than political party, which, according to the UN Office for the Coordination of Humanitarian Affairs makes the sustainability of a centralised political system "difficult".

Anthropologist Spencer MacCallum has identified the rule of law during the period as that of the Xeer, a customary law indigenous to Somalia. The law permits practices such as safe travel, trade, and marriage, which survives "to a significant degree" throughout Somalia, particularly in rural Somalia where it is "virtually unaffected". MacCallum credits the Xeer with "Somalia's success without a central government, since it provides an authentic rule of law to support trade and economic development." In the Xeer, law and crime are defined in terms of property rights; consequently the criminal justice system is compensatory rather than the punitive system of the majority of states, and the Xeer is "unequivocal in its opposition" to any form of taxation. Powell et al. (2006) find that the existence of the common law dispute resolution system in Somalia makes possible basic economic order. MacCallum compares the Xeer to the common law in 6th century Scotland, and notes that there is no monopoly of either police nor judicial services, a condition of polycentric law. However, a weakness of such a system is that it proves ineffective at handling disputes and enforcing resolutions that cross clan boundaries. For example, in a dispute involving telecommunications company Aerolite, the plaintiff from the weaker clan was unable to collect the "unfairly" small settlement they had been awarded.

=== Organized crime ===
==== Piracy ====
One of the most notable forms of organized crime during this period was piracy. The collapse of the central government and the absence of a functioning coast guard led to an increase in piracy off the coast of Somalia. Pirates targeted commercial vessels, holding them for ransom and generating significant revenue. In 2008 alone, Somali pirates were responsible for approximately 100 attacks, with ransoms ranging from $500,000 to $3.5 million per vessel. The total ransom income for that year was estimated at $120 million.

The economic impact of piracy extended beyond the immediate ransoms. Global shipping companies faced increased insurance premiums and rerouted their vessels to avoid Somali waters, leading to higher operational costs. The World Bank estimated that Somali piracy added approximately $18 billion annually to global shipping costs due to increased insurance premiums and rerouting.

==== Other forms ====
In addition to piracy, charcoal trafficking became a significant source of revenue for criminal networks. With the collapse of the banana industry and reduced access to European markets, the Somali charcoal trade flourished in the 1990s. Charcoal was produced by cutting down and burning acacia trees, then transported to ports in southern Somalia for export to the Gulf Cooperation Council states. This trade not only provided financial support to armed groups but also contributed to environmental degradation.

== Social conditions ==
The international aid group Médecins Sans Frontières stated that the level of daily violence during this period was "catastrophic". While the homicide rate was significantly higher than in the US or in Europe, it was actually lower than in most of the African countries. A statistic from 2000 indicated that only 21% of the population had access to safe drinking water at that time, and Somalia had one of the highest child mortality rates in the world with 10% of children dying at birth and 25% of those surviving birth dying before age five. Additionally, "adult literacy is estimated to have declined from the already low level of 24% in 1989 to 17.1% in 2001." A more recent 2003 study reported that the literacy rate was 19%. The impact on human development in Somalia of governmental collapse and ensuing civil war was profound, leading to the breakdown of political institutions, the destruction of social and economic infrastructure and massive internal and external migrations.

According to a study by the libertarian think tank the Independent Institute:

In 2005, Somalia ranked in the top 50 percent in six of our 13 measures, and ranked near the bottom in only three: infant mortality, immunization rates, and access to improved water sources. This compares favorably with circumstances in 1990, when Somalia last had a government and was ranked in the bottom 50 percent for all seven of the measures for which we had that year's data: death rate, infant mortality, life expectancy, main telephone lines, tuberculosis, and immunization for measles and DTP."

The libertarian think tank the Mises Institute also repeatedly praised Somalia in this era as showing many improvements compared to conditions under Barre, such as literacy and lifespan. The Libertarian think tank Cato Institute made similar statements.

Prior to the fall of the Somali government in the early 1990s, Somalia's life expectancy was approximately equal to neighboring Ethiopia. As of 2014, after a quarter of a century of minimal government, life expectancy in Somalia was 9 years behind Ethiopia. However, both of them improved drastically. During the year of 2025, Somalia had a life expectancy of 61.70 years, and is expected to rise to 63.70 years for 2026.

== Social organization ==
In the absence of functioning governmental institutions and regulations, they were supplanted by the private sector and clan law. Commentators identify evidence of areas where the private sector adapted to the stateless environment. A 2004 World Bank study of the Somali economy concluded that "it may be easier than is commonly thought for basic systems of finance and some infrastructure services to function where government is extremely weak or absent." The New York Times referred to post-state Mogadishu as "the ultimate example of deregulation," noting that "[g]utsy entrepreneurs, including some women, opened their own hospitals, schools… telephone companies, power plants and ports".

=== Communications ===
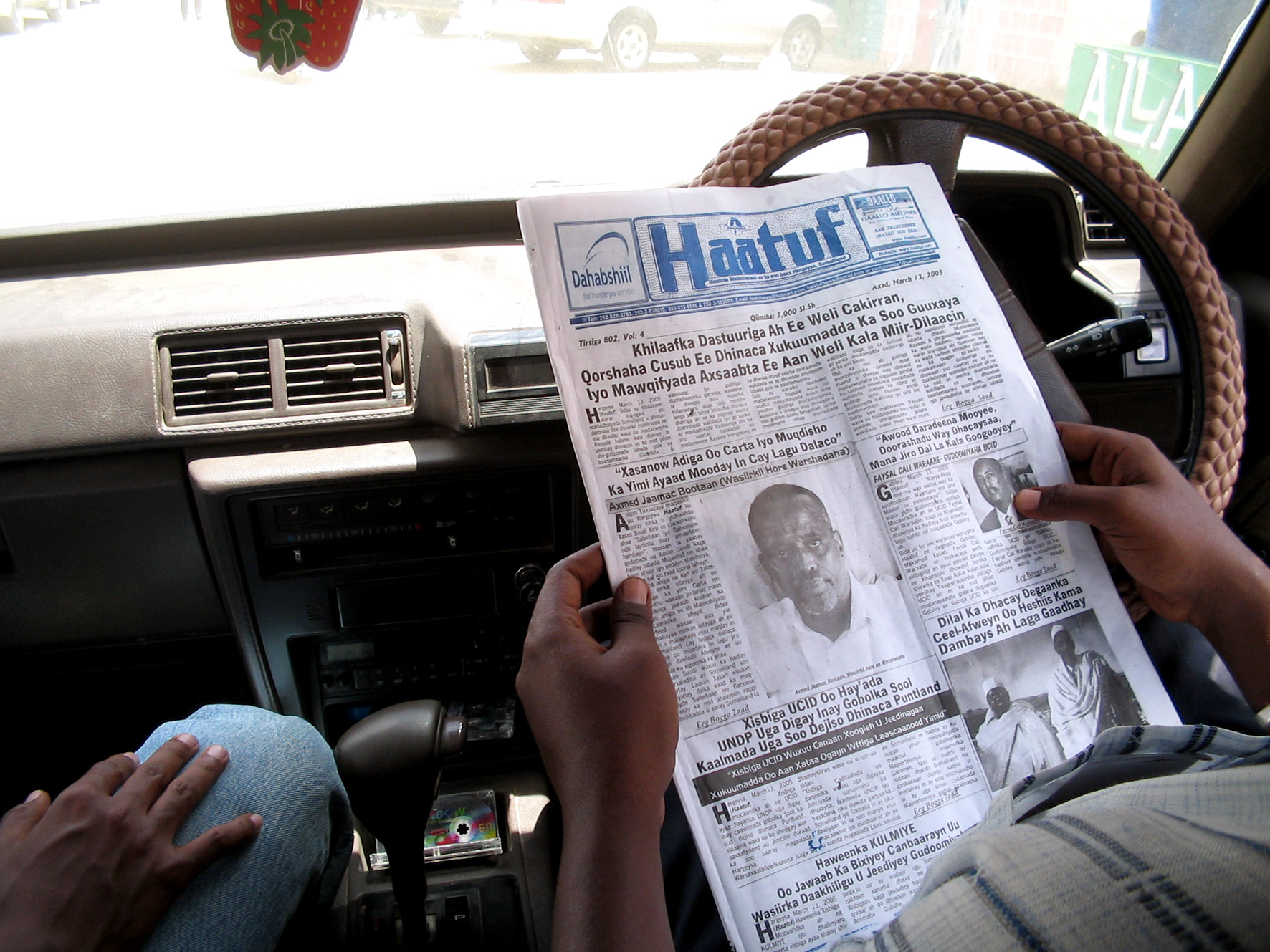
Private media enterprises – such as Haatuf newspaper from Hargeisa shown here – rapidly grew in the aftermath of state collapse.

In the absence of government service provision and regulation, private businessmen stepped in to provide telecommunications and mail services. In 2007 parts of Somalia had some of the best voice telecommunications in Africa, with 10 or more competing companies ready to wire home or office and provide crystal-clear service, including international long distance, for about $10 a month. According to the CIA World Factbook, private telephone companies "offer service in most major cities" via Wireless technology, charging "the lowest international rates on the continent", Installation time for a land-line was just three days, while in neighboring Kenya waiting lists were many years long. On the other hand, just 0.7% of the population of Somalia had access to internet in 2006, a sixth of Kenya's internet penetration at the time, and in 2007 mobile phone penetration rates in Somalia were amongst the lowest in Africa.

The Economist argued the lack of telecommunication regulation in Somalia represented "a vivid illustration of the way in which governments…can often be more of a hindrance than a help" to private entrepreneurs. Abdullahi Mohammed Hussein of Telecom Somalia stated that "the government post and telecoms company used to have a monopoly but after the regime was toppled, we were free to set up our own business", though he also commented that he would be "interested in paying taxes" if an incoming government improved the security situation.

=== Utilities ===
Since 1991 Somalia has lacked a functioning central electricity grid, but private entrepreneurs have offered electricity generation on a localised basis, typically offering a choice of daytime, evening or 24-hour electricity. Gaalkacyo, a desert town in central Somalia, was provided with streetlights by local entrepreneur Abdirizak Osman, who expanded his enterprises from telecommunications to power generators, not only lighting the town but also supplying free electricity to the local hospital.

Private entrepreneurs have also collected and distributed water, although due to a lack of purification there is little access to safe water.

=== Media ===
After the fall of the government, dozens of private newspapers, radio and television stations rapidly grew (Mogadishu has two fiercely competing TV stations), with private radio stations or newspapers in almost all major towns.

=== Transport ===
Multiple private airlines, including Air Somalia, Jubba Airways and Daallo Airlines, emerged to serve the Somali market. According to a 2005 World Bank report, the "private airline business in Somalia is now thriving with more than five carriers and price wars between the companies." Mohammed Yassin Olad, owner of Daallo Airlines, stated that the absence of government has led to both difficulties and benefits, and commented that "corruption is not a problem, because there is no government…We build the airports and we service the airports and we only fly when we are sure it's safe". Concurrently, the International Civil Aviation Organization and the United Nations Development Programme managed Somalia's airspace through the Civil Aviation Caretaker Authority for Somalia.

The expansion of the aviation industry was accompanied by the disruption of road transport; many roads are frequently blocked by militia checkpoints which demand payment (between $3 and $300, depending on goods carried) in order to allow the cars to continue their journey. A BBC report claimed there were seven such checkpoints in the 50 km between an airstrip and the capital, Mogadishu. Most of the money is used to buy khat, a drug used by the militiamen, and weapons such as the AK-47 and RPG-7.

Bosaso in relatively stable autonomous Puntland emerged as a regional hub and major port. A small fishing village prior to the fall of the state, Bosaso developed a lucrative import/export trade of U.S. $15 million per year out of its port during the 1990s. The population grew in eight years from 5,000 to 150,000, sustained by public services provided on a competitive basis by private enterprise, and court systems, schools and a university founded by the local community.

=== Education ===
In a 2007 study of the state of education in Somalia since the collapse of central authority in 1991, Abdullahi Sheikh Abdinoor found that "the Somali people have adapted rather well, under the circumstances, to the absence of the state, despite continuing insecurity and lawlessness prevailing in the country." Following the destruction of educational systems and infrastructure during the civil war, many new educational institutions were opened by community members, private enterprises and Islamic NGOs.

For centuries, the Somali community, as opposed to the state, has been in charge of Islamic education in all aspects, providing financial and administrative support. The majority of the schools are provided by the free market, sustained by school fees (typically US$10 per month); in cases where there are state-supported public schools, private schools are often coveted for their academic excellence, outperforming their public competitors in academic achievement tests.

By 2005 there were 1,172 primary schools, but levels of enrollment that were low even by African standards with only around 17–19% of schoolchildren in primary education. Nevertheless, this level of primary enrollment was approaching pre-war levels, with secondary school enrollment also showing an increase since 1998.

In Mogadishu, the Somalia National University, Benadir University and the Mogadishu University are three of the eight universities providing tertiary education in Southern Somalia, with the latter two institutions founded during the stateless period.

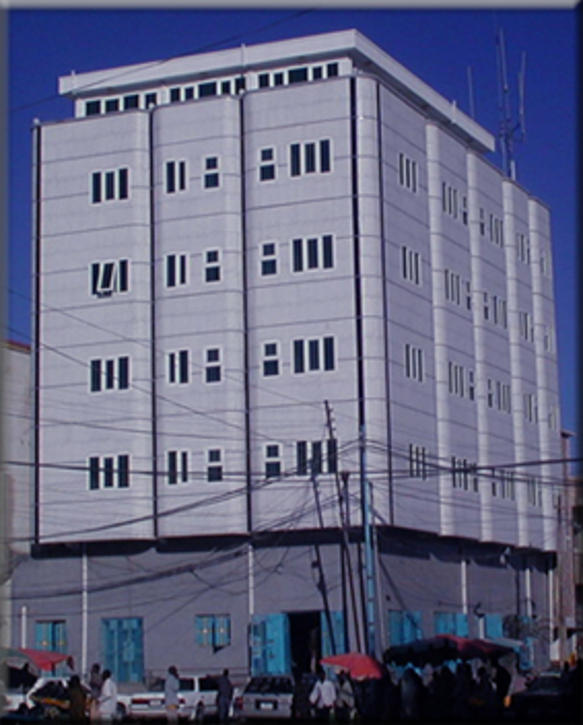
A money exchange center in Hargeisa, Somaliland. In the absence of a formal banking sector, money exchange services have sprung up throughout the country, handling about $1 billion in remittances annually.

=== Currency ===
Rival producers of Somali shillings emerged after 1991. These included the Na shilling, which failed to gain widespread acceptance, and the Balweyn I and II, which were forgeries of pre-1991 bank notes. A competition for seigniorage drove the value of the money down to about $0.04 per SoSh (1000) note, approximately the commodity cost. Consumers have refused to accept bills larger than the 1991 denominations, which has helped stop the devaluation from spiraling further. The pre-1991 notes and the subsequent forgeries are treated as the same currency. It takes large bundles to make cash purchases.

The relatively stable value of the currency in the 1990s compared to the 1980s is explained by Peter D. Little in Somalia: Economy without a State as resulting from the lack of a central government printing currency to pay for civil and military expenditures. Traders avoid the need to carry large amounts of Somali shillings by converting them to U.S. dollars and then wiring them to money houses in Somalia. Because identification can be easily forged, those seeking to pick up wired money are required to answer questions about their clan and kinship relations. Private remittance companies known as hawala assist in the transfer of money. One of the largest such companies, Al Barakaat, was shut down in 2001 by a U.S.-led initiative due to alleged terrorist ties; the company's communications business, with more than 40,000 subscribers, was also shut down.

With the establishment of the Transitional National Government in 2000, a group of businessmen imported about 30 billion shillings of Canadian-printed notes, sparking a collapse of the currency and wide-scale demonstrations and protests in Mogadishu. The value declined by 30 percent (to 13,000 per $1) in three months, and by the end of 2001 the currency had fallen to about SoSh 22,000 per US dollar. Further imports of money caused additional disruption and the TNG was forced to buy up large amounts of money.

In the autonomous northwestern Somaliland region, the Somaliland shilling is used as currency. It hasn't been recognized as legal tender by the international community, and has no official exchange rate. It is regulated by the Bank of Somaliland, the enclave's central bank. Although the separatist authorities in Somaliland attempted to bar usage of the Somali shilling, Somalia's official currency remained the preferred means of exchange for many peoples in the region.

== Economic conditions ==
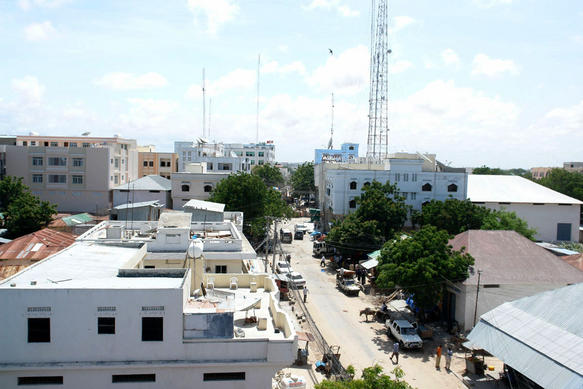
Bakaara Market in the heart of Mogadishu. In the absence of government regulation, Somali marketplaces have thrived.

Although it states that no reliable statistics are available for the period in question, the United Nations claims that Somalia, already one of the poorest countries in the world, has become even poorer as a result of civil war. However, the CIA Factbook maintains that gains were made during the early 2000s; "despite the seeming anarchy, Somalia's service sector has managed to survive and grow. Mogadishu's main market offers a variety of goods from food and khat to the newest electronic gadgets. Hotels continue to operate, and militias provide security."

When extreme poverty (percentage of individuals living on less than PPP$1 a day) was last measured by the World Bank in 1998, Somalia fared better than many other countries in Africa, over some of whom Somalia also had superior infrastructure. The CIA World Factbook counsels that "Statistics on Somalia's GDP, growth, per capita income, and inflation should be viewed skeptically", while estimating Somalia's GDP per capita at $600.

In the absence of a Somali state and its institutions, the private sector grew "impressively" according to the World Bank in 2003, particularly in the areas of trade, commerce, transport, remittance and infrastructure services and in the primary sectors, notably in livestock, agriculture and fisheries. In 2007, the United Nations reported that the country's service industry is also thriving. Economist Peter T. Leeson, in an event study of "the impact of anarchy on Somali development", found that "[t]he data suggest that while the state of this development remains low, on nearly all of 18 key indicators that allow pre- and post-stateless welfare comparisons, Somalis are better off under anarchy than they were under government." Powell et al. concur that in absolute terms, Somalia's living standards have improved and compare favorably with many existing African states, but also report that living standards have often improved "relative to other African countries since the collapse of the Somali central government."

== Islamic courts ==
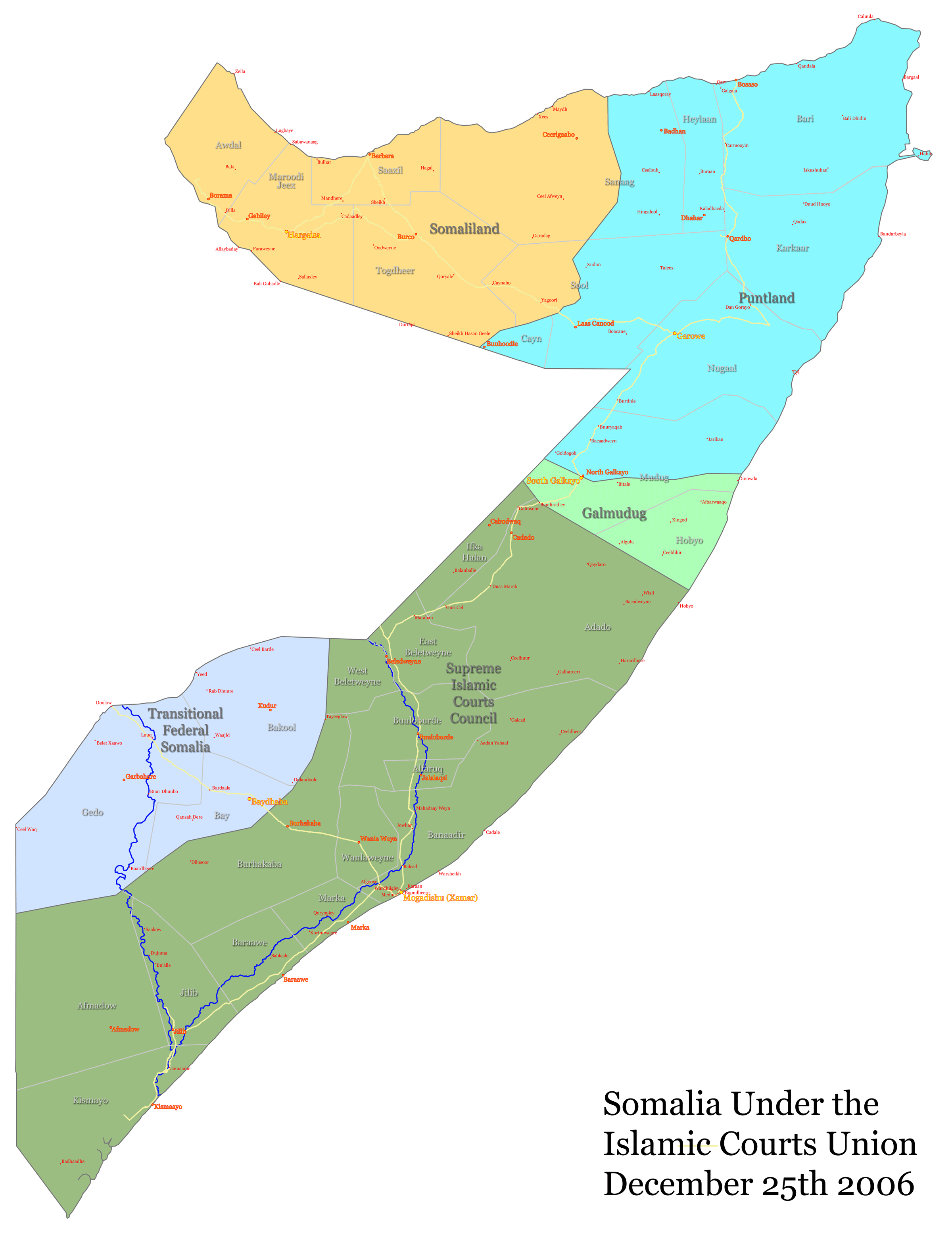
Political map of Somalia in December 2006 showing the political structure of the Islamic Courts Union at the height of its power during the Somali Civil War.

Following the collapse of centralized government, much of the legal system and most of the educational institutions and social services fell under the control of religious institutions, which often received significant funding and support from international charities. In 2005, some of these clerical organizations united to form the Islamic Courts Union, after the secular rebel leaders began to challenge the sharia-based judicial institutions. Wary of Islamist paramilitaries in the age of the war on terror, the CIA funneled hundreds of thousands of dollars to secular rebel leaders inside Somalia in 2006, intending thereby to neutralize the threat of suspected members of Al Qaeda they believed to be sheltered by the ICU. This was cited by experts as a factor in the resurgence of Islamic militias in the country, prompting the latter to engage in pre-emptive strikes which routed the rebel leaders and led to the seizure of Ford by the ICU. The ICU gained control of Mogadishu and its surrounding districts in June 2006, after the Second Battle of Mogadishu. The ICU was later overthrown by the Ethiopian military with the support of the United Nations, African Union, and the United States government. After the ICU forces were chased from Mogadishu, the leaders of the Transitional Federal Parliament entered Somalia declaring themselves the rightful governors of Somalia. As of October 2007, there was still widespread opposition within Somalia to the TFG, and the TFG's leaders and their allies were still attempting to suppress a strong insurgency. In January 2009 politician Abdirahman Ahmed was executed for alleged apostasy by a Sharia court.

== Transitional Federal Government ==
The Transitional Federal Government was internationally recognized as the government of Somalia until August 2012, when it was replaced by the Federal Government of Somalia. It was established in 2004 as a successor to the now defunct Transitional National Government, and currently occupies Somalia's seat in the United Nations. The TFG is allied with the Islamic Courts Union and the Alliance for the Re-liberation of Somalia, and is backed by the United States, the United Nations and the African Union. Its forces are fighting to quell the ongoing insurgency in Somalia and are attempting to gain control of the southern half of the country, as the northern regions are both autonomous and comparatively stable. As a truce, in March 2009, Somalia's newly established coalition government announced that it would implement Shari'a as the nation's official judicial system.

== See also ==
- Consolidation of states within Somalia (1998–2006)
- Kritarchy
- Piracy in Somalia
- Politics of Somalia
- Human rights in Somalia
