= Peter Freed =

American photographer

Peter Freed (born June 8, 1953) is an American director and portrait photographer. His portraits of Martin Scorsese, Sandra Bullock, George Clooney, Elton John, Bishop Desmond Tutu, Robert Downey Jr., Matt Damon, Robert De Niro, and many others have appeared on the covers of The New York Times, Premier, Esquire, Architectural Digest, Newsweek, USA Today as well as movie ads and billboards.

== Early life ==
Freed was born the youngest of three children. He has two sisters in Providence, Rhode Island. He studied behavioral psychology and cultural anthropology at American University. Growing up, Freed wanted to be an Olympic skier, and he taught skiing in Europe and Colorado for a number of years.

== Photography ==
While teaching skiing in Colorado, Freed joined a company photographing visitors atop the ski area at Copper Mountain., and later expanded into photographing friends and family in the area. He was approached by a reporter from the Denver Post who had needed a photograph to accompany the review of a local restaurant, the start of a relationship with the paper as a freelance photographer. Freed moved back east and secured a staff job at the Westport News in Connecticut. After a year, he became friends with a freelancer for The New York Times and would fill in for her when she wasn't available. The then assignment editor of The New York Times, Carlo Mastricolo, hired Freed to be part of the paper's freelance roster. Over the next 3 years, Freed shot over 1,400 assignments for The New York Times He was also a contract photographer for 4 years for both "USA Today" and "Architectural Digest". He and the late Malcolm Forbes were the only press photographers with press plates for their motorcycles.

Freed held the position of Director of Photographer for Columbia University Law School and works with many corporate clients including Sony, Cummings, Flight Safety, Apollo Global, Armstrong and many others. His work has been exhibited at the Santa Fe Gallery, International Center of Photography, Gallery of Geneva, Maine Media Gallery and The Art Directors Club of New York. He is the recipient of prestigious awards from American Photography, Photo District News and the American Society of Magazine Photographers.

== The Prime Book ==
In 2015, Peter Freed published Prime: Redefining Women in Their Prime, a portrait book that highlights women from the ages of 35 to 104 without makeup or retouching. The Prime Book garnered international support and press coverage. It is composed of 86 black and white portraits of women without makeup, jewelry or any form of retouching or Photoshop editing. Accompanying the portraits are essays written by each subject that redefine what it means to be a woman in her "Prime." The book is intended to explore the aging process, unrealistic beauty standards and the complexity of being a woman.

Women featured in the book are Emily Sandberg Gold, Christy Turlington, Brene Brown, Dani Shapiro and many other women considered remarkable by the author. Not every subject featured in Prime is a supermodel or celebrity. Many subjects in the book are depicted as unsung heroes that represent what it's like to be a woman in modern-day America.

Other published books including Freed's photography are The Power to Heal, Going Grey, A Day in the Life of China and A Day in the Life of America.

== Personal life ==
Peter Freed is a director and camera operator. His company Otherhandfilms has produced commercials for Lincoln Center, IWC watches, Silhouette, Columbia University, Merrill Lynch, Pypestream, Vacheron Constantin, Cadillac and others. He has taught at Maine Media Workshop, Santa Fe Workshops and PhotoPlus International Conference.

In 2016, Freed is slated to begin producing a feature-length documentary titled Depth of Field. The documentary will chronicle a wide array of notable award-winning photographers sharing their most memorable projects.

Freed lives in Riverdale, New York and has 2 daughters.
