= Road to Hell =

Road to Hell may refer to:

- The road to hell is paved with good intentions, a proverb
- Road to Hell (film), a 2008 fantasy film
- The Road to Hell, a 1989 album by Chris Rea
- The Road to Hell (song), a 1989 song by Chris Rea
- The Road to Hell: Part 2, a 1999 album by Chris Rea
- The Road to Hell (book), a 1997 book by Michael Maren
- Boiling Point: Road to Hell, a 2005 video game by Atari
- "Road to Hell", a song by Rory Gallagher from Defender
- "Road to Hell", a song by Sleigh Bells from Reign of Terror
- Road to Hell, episode of Tour de France: Unchained#Season 3
- "Road to Hell", opening number of Hadestown

== See also ==
- Highway to Hell (disambiguation)
- Rue de la Harpe, formerly called "rue d'Enfer" (literally "street of Hell")
