= Monique Alexander =

American pornographic film actress

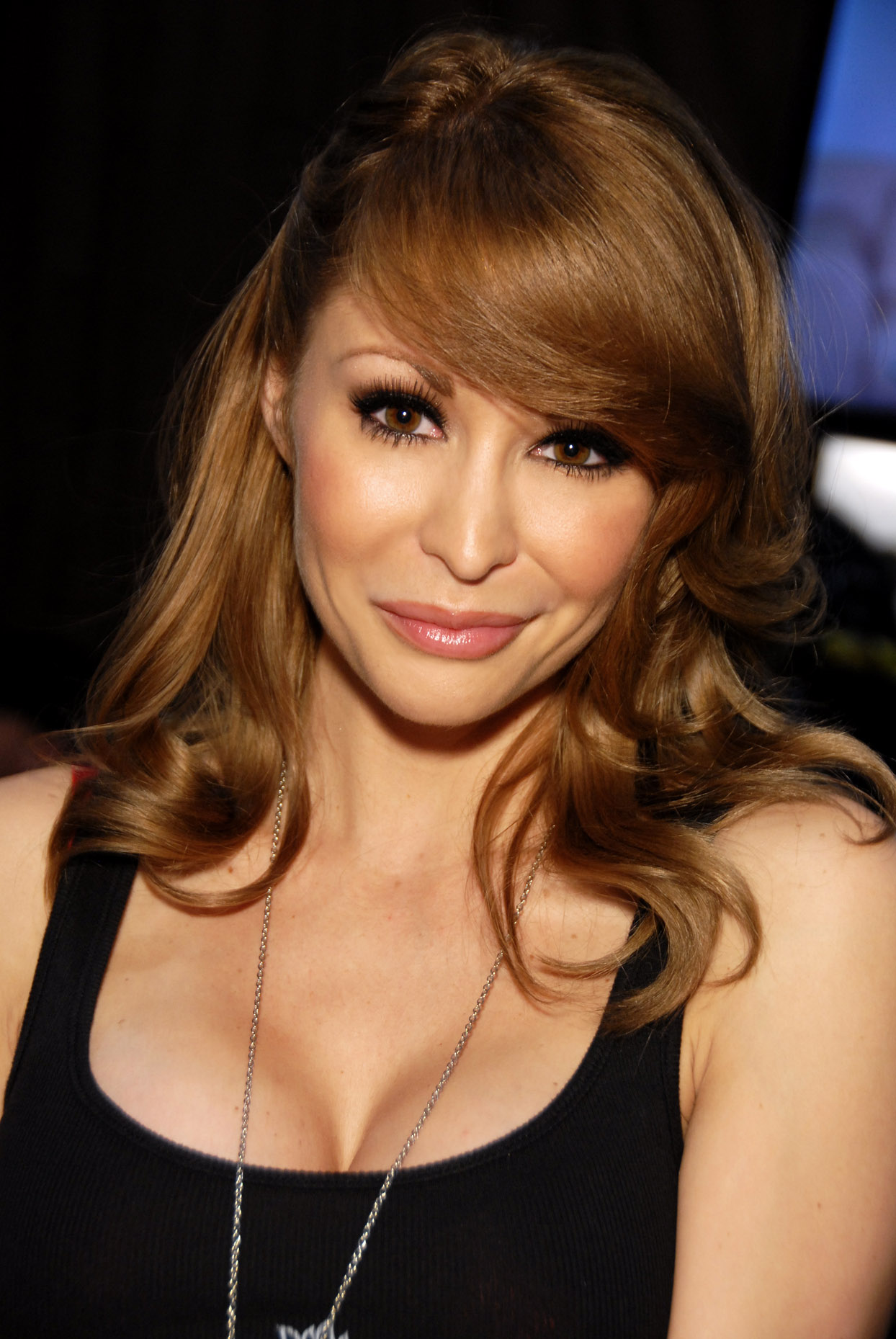
- Alexander in 2011
- Born: 1981 or 1982 (age 43–44)
- Occupations: Pornographic actress; nude model
- Height: 5 ft 5 in (165 cm)
- Website: moniquealexander.com

Monique Alexander (born 1981 or 1982) is an American pornographic actress, nude model, and 2017 AVN Hall of Fame inductee. Alexander has also been an advocate for free speech and sex education, and has appeared on Fox News and in a debate at Yale University addressing these topics. In addition to her pornographic work, she has had several cameo appearances in mainstream films and television shows.

== Career ==
=== Sex industry ===
Alexander began working in the adult industry as a stripper in Sacramento when she was 18 years old to supplement her daytime earnings as a receptionist. She started performing in adult films in 2001 beginning with a girl-girl scene. In addition to a catalog of solely girl-girl hardcore work, she appeared in a handful of softcore erotic films produced by HBO and Cinemax such as Hotel Erotica, The Sex Spa, Sex House, and Voyeur: Inside Out.

Alexander was a contract girl for Vivid Entertainment from 2004 to 2009. After years of appearing only in girl-girl scenes, she began appearing in boy-girl scenes in 2005, including an interactive DVD and a feature role with Rocco Siffredi in Vivid's Lexie and Monique Love Rocco. She was a Trophy Girl at the 2002 AVN Awards ceremony in Las Vegas.

=== Mainstream acting ===
Alexander appeared in a mainstream film entitled Spider's Web with Stephen Baldwin and Kari Wuhrer in 2002.

Alexander made a cameo appearance in the Season 3 finale of the HBO series Entourage. In 2007, she became a sports reporter on National Lampoon Comedy Radio's The Phil Show.

She also appeared in the 2009 action film Crank: High Voltage.

== Advocacy ==
Alexander was invited to the Fox News show Red Eye w/ Greg Gutfeld to discuss a nonpartisan study that found that abstinence-only programs for teens do not work, whereas safe sex education programming was highly successful. Alexander discussed what being a Vivid Girl meant to her as well as her preference for hands-on sex education, with the segment airing on November 10, 2007. On February 15, 2008, she and Ron Jeremy represented the industry in a debate at Yale University against pornography opponents Craig Gross (founder of the XXX Church) and Donny Pauling, a former porn producer, and the debate was aired on ABC's Nightline.

In 2017, Alexander starred in a public service campaign encouraging parents to discuss sexual health education with their children, noting that children are likely to see pornography at some point in their childhood, and need to be informed that what is portrayed in pornography is an unrealistic representation of sexual behavior.

== Awards ==
Year	Award	Category	Film
2008	AVN Award	Best All-Girl Sex Scene	Sex & Violins
2008	AVN Award	Best Group Sex Scene	Debbie Does Dallas... Again
2009	AVN Award	Best Couples Sex Scene	Cry Wolf
2011	AVN Award	Best All-Girl Couples Sex Scene	Meow!
2017	AVN Award	Hall of Fame	—N/a
2024	Brazzers	Hall of Fame	—N/a
2025	XMA Award	Best Sex Scene - Orgy/Group	Brazzers Presents: 20 for 20
2025	AVN Award	Best Foursome/Orgy Scene	Brazzers Presents: 20 for 20
