= Somali Relief and Development Society =

Humanitarian NGO in Somalia

- Founded: 2006
- Type: NGO
- Location: Somalia
- Website: sordes.ngo

Somali Relief and Development Society (SORDES) is a non-governmental organization (NGO) that focuses on humanitarian and development efforts in Somalia. SORDES primarily operates in Somalia, focusing on providing humanitarian and development assistance to communities in need throughout the country.

== History ==
The Somali Relief and Development Society was founded in 2006 during the civil war in Somalia. It emerged as a response to the humanitarian crisis and the need for assistance in the war-torn country. SORDES aimed to provide relief aid and support to communities affected by conflict, poverty, and natural disasters.

Over the years, SORDES has expanded its scope to include not only emergency relief efforts but also long-term development projects. These projects often focus on areas such as healthcare, education, water and sanitation, livelihoods, and community empowerment. SORDES has faced numerous challenges in its operations due to the complex socio-political situation in Somalia, including insecurity, instability, and access issues.

These challenges, SORDES has remained committed to its mission of improving the lives of people in Somalia and contributing to the country's development. It has collaborated with various international organizations, donors, and local partners to implement its programs effectively and efficiently.

== Background ==
SORDES is dedicated to providing humanitarian aid and development assistance in Somalia. Established in early 2006 during Somalia's civil war, SORDES emerged as a response to the urgent need for assistance in the war-torn country.

Initially focusing on emergency relief efforts to address the immediate needs of conflict-affected communities, SORDES has since expanded its scope to include long-term development projects. These initiatives often target areas such as healthcare, education, water and sanitation, livelihoods, and community empowerment.

Facing numerous challenges, including insecurity, instability, and access issues, SORDES has remained committed to its mission of improving the lives of people in Somalia and contributing to the country's development. The organization collaborates with international partners, donors, and local stakeholders to implement its programs effectively.
