= A Little White Lie =

2022 American film by Michael Maren

- Theatrical release poster
- Directed by: Michael Maren
- Screenplay by: Michael Maren
- Based on: Shriver by Chris Belden
- Produced by: Michael J. Reiser; Byron Wetzel; Lucas Jarach; Josh Kesselman; Jina Panebianco; Robert Ogden Barnum
- Starring: Michael Shannon; Kate Hudson; Zach Braff; Kate Linder; Aja Naomi King; Da'Vine Joy Randolph; Don Johnson
- Cinematography: Edd Lukas
- Edited by: Ed Yonaitis; Patrick J. Smith
- Music by: Alex Wurman
- Production companies: CaliWood Pictures; Dooey World Productions
- Distributed by: Saban Films
- Release dates: October 14, 2022 (NBFF); March 3, 2023
- Running time: 101 minutes
- Country: United States
- Language: English
- Box office: $22,482

A Little White Lie is a 2022 American independent comedy film written and directed by Michael Maren and based on the 2014 novel Shriver by Chris Belden. It stars Michael Shannon, Kate Hudson, Don Johnson, and Zach Braff. The film is about a handyman with the same name as a famous writer who is mistakenly invited to a literary festival and is welcomed by fans and writers, but is exposed as an impostor when the real Shriver arrives.

Production was initially set to begin in 2017 but was postponed to 2020. With a new cast, filming began in February 2020 and was one week short of wrapping before the COVID-19 pandemic halted production until over a year later. It was released in theaters and video on demand on March 3, 2023.

== Premise ==
A famous writer named Shriver is invited to attend a college's literary festival, but the invitation is mistakenly sent to a "down-on-his-luck" handyman with the same name. Despite this, he accepts the invitation and travels to the college, where he is welcomed by fans and other writers, and even begins a romance with an English professor. Eventually, the real Shriver arrives and exposes the handyman as an impostor. The film ends with Shriver asking the English professor if they can start over, leaving his identity nebulous.

== Cast ==
- Michael Shannon as Shriver
- Kate Hudson as Simone Cleary
- Romy Byrne as Teresa
- Don Johnson as T. Wasserman
- Da'Vine Joy Randolph as Delta Jones
- Aja Naomi King as Blythe Brown
- Benjamin King as Jack Blunt
- M. Emmet Walsh as Dr. Baldwin
- Perry Mattfeld as Layla
- Mark Boone Junior as Lenny
- Giorgia Whigham as Charlie
- Jimmi Simpson as Detective Karpas
- Adhir Kalyan as Victor Bennet
- Wendie Malick as Dr. Bedrosian
- Zach Braff as the real Shriver
- Kate Linder as the college president
- Peyton List as Sophie Firestone

== Production ==
In April 2017, it was reported that Toni Collette and Thomas Haden Church had been cast in the originally titled film, Shriver, with Michael Maren writing and directing based on Chris Belden's 2013 novel of the same name. That following month, Whoopi Goldberg and Giancarlo Esposito joined the cast. In 2019, Michael Shannon joined the cast as the lead Shriver and afterwards the production was put on hold while Maren received cancer treatment. Shannon got on board after Maren attended Shannon's play at the A Red Orchid Theatre and pitched the role over dinner. Maren had Philip Seymour Hoffman in mind to play Shriver before even writing the screenplay and before Hoffman's death. Kate Hudson signed on to star in the film later that year. Da'Vine Joy Randolph, Jimmi Simpson, Zach Braff, Mark Boone Junior, Aja Naomi King, Adhir Kalyan, and Benjamin King joined the cast in 2020, replacing Collette, Church, Goldberg, and Esposito.

The film was originally scheduled to be shot in Canada in 2017, but there were issues with assembling a crew and the production was moved to West Virginia, where it encountered financial difficulties. In early 2020, while Maren was prepping for principal photography to begin in New Orleans, new producers were brought in who quickly changed the location to Los Angeles. With a new crew and cinematographer, Maren said in an interview, "The DP that I had actually storyboarded the entire film with was suddenly not available and didn't want to do a film that we only had two weeks to prep. So there were days on the film at the beginning where we would shoot a 12-hour day and then I would go out with my [assistant director] and we would be scouting that night. The hotel where we shot, we didn't lock that location down until Saturday and we were shooting on Monday, so the production designers had one day to try to prepare those sets". Filming commenced in February 2020 and was then suspended due to COVID-19 three weeks into filming and one week before completion. After being halted for 400 days, filming completed after a six-day shoot. Shooting took place at the University of Redlands.

== Release ==
A Little White Lie premiered at the Newport Beach Film Festival on October 14, 2022. Saban Films released the film on March 3, 2023 in limited theaters and Paramount Pictures released it on digital platforms.

=== Critical reception ===
On the review aggregator website Rotten Tomatoes, 35% of 37 critics' reviews are positive, with an average rating of 5/10. Metacritic, which uses a weighted average, assigned the film a score of 42 out of 100, based on eight critics, indicating "mixed or average" reviews.

Richard Roeper of the Chicago Sun-Times gave the film a positive review, calling it "whimsical and sharply written and beautifully performed" and praising Shannon's performance as Shriver. Mick LaSalle writing for the San Francisco Chronicle said the performances, characters and script was "a little better than it had to be". He called Maren's direction "tonally right, full of warmth and touches of humor; he makes it an inviting film to watch" and noted his surprise to find out the film was "interrupted more than halfway in by a 400-day pause due to the COVID pandemic." Variety's Rene Rodriguez praised Shannon's performance and the film's exploration of the themes of deception and self-discovery, but criticized the pacing and the "lack of wit or sophistication."

Brett Buckalew of The A.V. Club gave a mixed review, writing "The execution of the simultaneous mistaken identity and fish-out-of-water shenanigans that ensue is oddly muted; you keep waiting for Maren to amp up the comic energy and narrative complications, but it isn't until the satisfyingly madcap climax that he really does." Jeannette Catsoulis of The New York Times wrote negatively, saying "Hobbled by a lack of visual oomph or verbal sparkle, A Little White Lie pokes feebly at impostor syndrome and writerly insecurity. Maren settles for a muddled mystery and a limp love connection. Shannon and Hudson never look half as happy together as Don Johnson looks on the back of that horse."
