= Benjamin King (actor) =

American actor (born 1971)

- Born: November 8, 1971 (age 54); Los Angeles, California, US
- Occupation: Actor
- Years active: 1991–present
- Spouse: Laura Kravitz (m. 2004)
- Children: 2

Benjamin King (born November 8, 1971) is an American actor.

== Career ==
King guest starred on Scrubs as Milos and appeared in episodes of Grey's Anatomy, Las Vegas, and Mike & Molly. He starred on Disney Channel TV series Liv and Maddie as Pete Rooney, father of main characters, during the show's first three seasons. His character did not appear in the final season.

== Personal life ==
On May 29, 2004, he married Laura (née Kravitz) King. They live in Encino, California with their two daughters.

== Filmography ==
=== Film ===
| Year | Title | Role | Notes |
|---|---|---|---|
| 1997 | Hollywood Safari | Rookie McLean | |
| 1998 | Lethal Weapon 4 | Detective | |
| 1999 | A Little Inside | Ed Mills | |
| 2002 | Spider's Web | Harry Burnham | |
| 2003 | S.W.A.T. | Customs Agent #1 | |
| 2005 | Extreme Dating | George Thurman | |
| 2014 | A Short History of Decay | Jack Fisher | |
| 2018 | The Middle of X | Carter Camply | |
| 2019 | You Are Here | Jared | |
| 2023 | A Little White Lie | Jack Blunt | |

=== Television ===
| Year | Title | Role | Notes |
|---|---|---|---|
| 1991 | Saved by the Bell | Craig Strand | Episode: "My Boyfriend's Back" |
| 1996 | 3rd Rock from the Sun | Man in Bar | Episode: "Dick's First Birthday" |
| 1997 | ER | Cosi | Episode: "Ground Zero" |
| 1998 | JAG | Dr. Sanders | Episode: "Angels 30" |
| 1999 | The Sky's On Fire | Gary | Television film |
| 1999 | Pensacola: Wings of Gold | Lt. Steven Rappaport | Episode: "Tip of the Spear" |
| 2000 | Party of Five | Mark | Episode: "Too Cool for School" |
| 2000 | Partners | Larry | Television film |
| 2002 | Providence | Hank | Episode: "Act Naturally" |
| 2002 | The District | Ruben | Episode: "Explicit Activities" |
| 2002 | Less than Perfect | Tom | Episode: "The Pole" |
| 2003 | Hidden Hills | Don | Episode: "The Neighbors" |
| 2003 | The Guardian | Mark | Episode: "Big Coal" |
| 2003 | Run of the House | Mark | Episode: "Sally's New Boss" |
| 2003 | Saving Jessica Lynch | Robert J. Dowdy | Television film |
| 2004 | Happy Family | Don | Episode: "Bye Bye Birdie" |
| 2004 | Six Feet Under | Greg | Episode: "Can I Come Up Now?" |
| 2004 | Weekends | Preston McIntyre | Television film |
| 2005 | What I Like About You | Alan Lloyd, food critic | Episode: "Sex and the Single Girls" |
| 2005 | Freddie | Bill | Episode: "Halloween" |
| 2005 | The King of Queens | Larry | Episode: "Baker's Doesn't" |
| 2006 | CSI: Miami | Russell Miller | Episode: "Collision" |
| 2016 | Stroller Wars | Russell | Television film |
| 2007 | Scrubs | Miloš | Episode: "My Perspective" |
| 2007 | The Wedding Bells | Russell Hawkins | 4 episodes |
| 2007 | Side Order of Life | Nick Wainwright | Episode: "When Pigs Fly" |
| 2008 | CSI: Crime Scene Investigation | Stewart Lytle | Episode: "Two and a Half Deaths" |
| 2008 | Happy Hour | Chuck | Episode: "The Election" |
| 2008 | The Ex List | Josh | Episode: "Protect and Serve" |
| 2008 | Zip | Spivey | Television film |
| 2009 | Psych | Drimmer | Episode: "Lassie Did a Bad, Bad Thing" |
| 2009 | Better Off Ted | Gil | Episode: "You Are the Boss of Me" |
| 2010 | NCIS | Ron Sands | Episode: "Short Fuse" |
| 2010 | Mike & Molly | David | Episode: "Mike Snores" |
| 2012 | Working Class | Buddy | Episode: "The Buddy System" |
| 2012 | Weeds | Rog / Soccer Dad 1 | 2 episodes |
| 2012 | Bits and Pieces | Pete | Television film |
| 2013 | Grey's Anatomy | Dalton Marks | Episode: "Get Up, Stand Up" |
| 2013–2016 | Liv and Maddie | Pete Rooney | 65 episodes |
| 2016 | Better Things | Charles Kemp | Episode: "Woman Is the Something of the Something" |
