= Highway to Hell (disambiguation) =

Highway to Hell is a 1979 album by AC/DC.

Highway to Hell may also refer to:

- "Highway to Hell" (song), song by AC/DC from the 1979 album of the same name
- Highway to Hell Tour
- Highway to Hell (film), 1992 film starring Chad Lowe and Kristy Swanson
- Highway to Hell (TV series), American true crime series
- "Highway to Hell" (Dawson's Creek), a 2002 television episode
- Ghost Rider: Highway to Hell
- D-32 (Michigan county highway), road colloquially referred to as the "Highway to Hell"

== See also ==
- Hell's Highway (disambiguation)
- Highway Thru Hell, Canadian reality TV show
- Saskatchewan Highway 35, the "Highway from Hell"
- Road to Hell (disambiguation)
