= Donny Pauling =

American film producer

Donny Pauling (born c. 1974) is a former pornographic film producer who later worked as an anti-porn activist, Christian speaker, and Internet advertiser. His views were shaped by his time in the porn industry, in which he worked for nine years, and led him to view its effect as detrimental to persons involved.

In 2015, Pauling admitted to engaging in sex with three teenage girls from 2012 to 2014, "motivated by an unnatural or abnormal interest in children," according to his plea. He pleaded no contest and agreed to a 6-year prison sentence.

== Early life ==
Pauling was born the son of a Pentecostal pastor. He has stated that his strong Christian upbringing is what began to turn him away from Christianity. When he was a senior in high school he moved into his aunt's home in another city to take an advanced math class. It was here he met his future wife, Wendy, who was a devout Christian. He would eventually reconvert to Christianity. They dated for many years before finally marrying. Pauling has stated that it was during this time, when he lived with his young wife, that they purchased a computer and he began his fascination with pornography. Eventually he decided he somehow wanted a career making pornography and founded Pauling Technology Consulting.

== Career in pornography ==
Pauling Technology Consulting was founded in 1997 to create pornographic content to be licensed by other larger companies. He funded this side business all through his own money he had saved up. For the first three years of his career, it was a side business of his that earned him extra income. When he eventually told his wife about his activities, the marriage fell apart and he moved into his office. When he began doing his porn career full-time, the first month he brought in over $50,000.

He began at first taking photos of young women, ultimately filming scenes of both "hardcore" and "softcore" pornography. He created content with pornographic models and actresses that he then published under contract for larger porn sites. One of his largest and most lucrative contracts was with Playboy, with whom he worked for many years.

For several years he was averaging an income of around half a million dollars. Pauling stated that he was deeply immersed in the lifestyle, wealth, and affluence that came with his career. He claims it further pushed him away from his family and Christianity. He again fell out of Christianity at this time, developing a hatred for it. Part of this hatred, he has stated, stemmed from Christian groups protesting against his work or outside porn conventions telling him he was "going to hell".

Pauling routinely advertised his content on Christian web pages and forums, since he saw them as 'hypocrites' and 'sexually repressed'. He has claimed that it was on these databases and forums that he received some of his greatest number of clients.

Despite his continuing and successful career he began to despise the man he had become. He has stated that late in his career, many of the women he had recruited into the industry had contacted him in the hopes of having their Internet content taken down, although he lacked the authority to do so. He has also stated that several of these women had careers and relationships ruined due to their involvement in pornography.

=== XXX Church ===
In 2006, while entering the Las Vegas Porn Convention, and after being accosted by Christian protesters, he took notice of a sign for XXXChurch, a church group preaching acceptance of any and all persons, including porn-industry workers. He had previously been introduced to XXCChurch in 2002, but it had not taken serious steps into joining until then. XXXChurch, headed by Craig Gross became very popular at porn conventions, brothels, strip clubs, etc. Pauling became interested in this group, as it preached tolerance for all. “The Christians I grew up around would never talk to a porn producer, much less broadcast it to their listeners...But they were doing things in such a different way. They were actually loving people. It was such a non-confrontational approach. I couldn't help but say, if I was going to be a Christian, this is the kind of Christian I’d want to be.”

At first he was antagonistic towards the group, calling them 'hypocrites' and posting online comments such as "God does not exist". However, over time he became more open and accepting of the group. He eventually would become more active in it, eventually joining and deciding to reconvert once more.

He had begun to detest the lifestyle and effects pornography had on his life.

=== Leaving the industry ===
Due to his reconversion into Christianity, he began second-guessing his career in pornography. He was offered a new, very lucrative contract by Playboy. At first he intended to accept the offer, believing that his Christian faith and a porn career were compatible. However, after what he claims to be an intervention by God, he decided that he could no longer stay in the industry.

Soon after he partially reconciled with his wife, although they remain divorced. Quitting the industry, he suddenly had much less income. However the family received large donations from various Christian charities and Pauling has stated that all his hatred of Christianity melted then.

He has lamented at the number of women he had previously recruited or worked with who have since contacted him depicting their regret and shame at having done porn.

== Anti-porn activism ==
Pauling soon after began taking seminary classes to become a Pastor. He viewed his previous life in porn production and use as an addiction and began speaking about it. With the help of Craig Gross and XXXChurch, he started an outreach that spoke about the dangers of pornography from multiple points of view. Pauling said that pornography was addictive and that the industry was harmful to women. As a Christian, he believed it to be sinful. Pauling has expressed the view that pornography use can lead to other more serious vices including sex trafficking.

=== Guilty Pleasure ===
Pauling spoke at the Guilty Pleasure conference in Melbourne, Australia. Guilty Pleasure is a non-profit Christian organization with the goal of showing the negative effects of pornography use. At this conference Pauling explained his mission to educate the world on the negative effects of porn usage. In this conference he also illustrated how widespread porn usage was, even among Christian groups.

He has done several interviews for Guilty Pleasure in which he expresses his beliefs that porn is incredibly damaging to the actors who partake, along with families, and individuals themselves. He states that porn usage is overall degrading for all parties involved and seeks to educate users on the damage they do to themselves.

=== Debate ===
Pauling and Gross together debated at Yale University against two famous porn actors Ron Jeremy and Monique Alexander. In the debate, Pauling and Gross said that today far more porn is viewed than historically and that it has become more accessible to young children.

Pauling stated that porn is incredibly degrading to the women, and sometimes men, involved. The other side did not deny that exploitation and abuse happens, but claimed that women accepted the risk of doing porn. The debate was inconclusive, but each side kept strongly to their beliefs.

== Sex charges ==
Pauling was arrested December 1, 2014 on three felony sex charges, including unlawful intercourse (statutory rape), after a 16-year-old female told law enforcement that Pauling had ongoing sexual contact with her for the past three years. The teen informed detectives that Pauling had told her that if she were to ever tell officers about the relationship, she should tell him first so he could kill himself. She also said Pauling told her he wasn't like other child molesters because he loved her.

On October 15, 2015, Pauling admitted to engaging in oral and vaginal sex with that victim from when she was age 14 in 2012, continuing into 2014. He also admitted to lewd or lascivious behavior with a 16-year-old female, “motivated by an unnatural or abnormal interest in children,” according to the plea. Pauling also admitted massaging a third teen victim's genitals in early 2014. He pleaded no contest and agreed to a 6-year prison sentence.
