= Hell's Highway =

Hell's Highway may refer to:

- a nickname for Highway 69 during the Second World War Operation Market Garden
- Hell's Highway (1932 film), a crime film
- Hell's Highway (2002 film), a horror film
- Brothers in Arms: Hell's Highway, a 2008 videogame by Ubisoft based on Operation Market Garden
- Hell's Highway, a 1983 board game by Victory Games, based on Operation Market Garden, see List of board wargames
- Hell's Highway, a 1983 video game by Avalon Hill, see List of Avalon Hill games
- Hell's Highway: The True Story of Highway Safety Films, a 2002 documentary film by Bret Wood
- Violent Road, a 1958 film also known as Hell's Highway

== See also ==
- Highway to Hell (disambiguation)
- Highway Thru Hell, Canadian reality TV show
- Saskatchewan Highway 35, the "Highway from Hell"
