= Spider's Web (2002 film) =

- Directed by: Paul Levine
- Written by: Robert Stiff; David Lloyd; D. Alvelo
- Starring: Stephen Baldwin; Kari Wuhrer
- Cinematography: Kazoo Minami
- Edited by: Josh Muscatine
- Music by: Michael Cohen
- Release date: November 12, 2002
- Running time: 88 minutes
- Country: United States
- Language: English

Spider's Web is a 2002 American direct-to-video film directed by Paul Levine and starring Stephen Baldwin and Kari Wuhrer. The film, described as a "low-rent sex thriller", was also produced by both Baldwin and Wuhrer.

== Production ==
Wuhrer said of the film: "The pace of making this movie, it was extreme. It was the longest day imaginable". Wuhrer's breast implants encapsulated during filming, which she noticed while preparing to film a nude scene, so she had them removed later that year. She noted that both Levine and Baldwin were compassionate about her ordeal, and worked to continue filming in ways that would conceal the disfigurement.

== Plot ==
Clay Harding (Baldwin) recruits executive Lauren Bishop (Wuhrer) to help him steal $40 million from his father Robert Harding (George Murdock). The pair devise a plot to steal Robert's passwords and set up a dummy corporation mimicking a company that Robert is interested in buying in order to divert his funds to a Swiss bank account. Clay secretly plans to double-cross Laura and allow her to take the blame for the theft, which she realizes when she discovers that a co-worker who had engineered her being fired from her job, Harry Burnham (Benjamin King), was Clay's college classmate. Clay murders Burnham and makes it look like a suicide. However, after a series of machinations on both sides, Lauren ultimately prevails, leaving the country with access to the money and splitting it with a co-conspirator while Clay is believed to have murdered her.

== Cast ==
- Stephen Baldwin as Clay Harding
- Kari Wuhrer as Lauren Bishop
- Benjamin King as Harry Burnham
- Scott Williamson as Doug Caulfield
- Michael Gregory as Manny Molka
- George Lazenby as Leland De Winter
- Tony Colitti as Det. Nick Perez
- George Murdock as Robert Harding
- Matt Borlenghi as Bob Smooth
- William L. Johnson as Conman Jerry
- Elizabeth Barondes as Mike
- Derek Basco as Gabe Yamada
- Joe Duer as Young Man
- Marykate Harris as Mrs. Wick (billed as Mary Kate Harris)
- Jeanette Driver as Emily
- Ilyse Mimoun as Messenger
- Lavelle Roby as Miss Wilkins
- Robert Donavan as Older Man
- Monique Alexander as Young Woman
- Nellie Sciutto as Fran Crawford
- Vladimir Nemirovsky as Lazio
- Richard Gabai as Account Manager
- Anna Hsieh as Cyber Cafe Girl
- Christopher Birt as Plain Clothes Cop
- Tracy Britton as Receptionist

== Reception ==
The movie was critically panned as "boring", with one review summarizing it as repeated episodes of "some drama and story followed by nudity and sex which in the end makes this movie all about how sexy actress Kari Wuhrer is". Scott Weinberg, writing for Apollo Guide, wrote "I suppose if a movie has entirely vanished from memory not 24 hours after it's been viewed, that's its own review right there".
