= A Short History of Decay (film) =

- Directed by: Michael Maren
- Written by: Michael Maren
- Produced by: Alfred Sapse
- Starring: Bryan Greenberg; Linda Lavin; Harris Yulin; Emmanuelle Chriqui; Kathleen Rose Perkins; Benjamin King
- Cinematography: Nancy Schreiber
- Edited by: Timothy Snell
- Music by: Julia Kent
- Production company: Big Fan Films
- Release date: October 12, 2013 (Hamptons)
- Running time: 94 minutes
- Country: United States
- Language: English

A Short History of Decay is a 2013 American comedy-drama film written and directed by Michael Maren. It stars Bryan Greenberg, Linda Lavin, Harris Yulin, Emmanuelle Chriqui, Benjamin King and Kathleen Rose Perkins. Though its title is taken from the work of philosophy by Emil Cioran, it is not an adaptation of the book.

The film was shot in October and November 2012 in Wilmington, North Carolina, Wrightsville Beach, North Carolina, and New York City. It premiered at the Hamptons International Film Festival on October 12, 2013 and it opened theatrically at the Village East Cinema on May 16, 2014.

== Plot ==
The film is a comedy about a failed Brooklyn writer, Nathan Fisher, who visits his ailing parents in Florida. His mother has Alzheimer's, his father has recently had a stroke, and his girlfriend has recently broken up with him.

== Cast ==
- Bryan Greenberg as Nathan Fisher
- Linda Lavin as Sandy Fisher
- Harris Yulin as Bob Fisher
- Emmanuelle Chriqui as Erika Bryce
- Kathleen Rose Perkins as Shelly
- Benjamin King as Jack Fisher
- Rebecca Dayan as Alex
- Joanna Manning as Molly

== Coffeehouse scene ==
On November 19, 2012, Maren, with cinematographer Nancy Schreiber, shot the final scenes of the film at Kos Koffe, a coffee shop in Park Slope, Brooklyn. In the scene, Greenberg's Nathan Fisher walks into the shop intending to work on his writing to win his girlfriend back. In an elaborate sight gag, Maren brought 43 New York Area writers to fill every seat in the coffee shop. Nathan Fisher looks at them with the feeling that he doesn't belong in their company. The writers included Jennifer Egan, Michael Cunningham, Philip Gourevich, Kurt Andersen, Gary Shteyngart, Darin Strauss, Jane Green, Jean Hanff Korelitz and Nick Flynn.
