= Somali Civil War =

Ongoing civil war in East Africa

- Part of the conflicts in the Horn of Africa, the Ethiopian–Somali conflict, the war against the Islamic State, Operation Enduring Freedom – Horn of Africa, and the war on terror
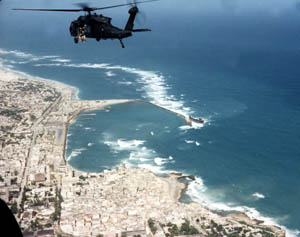
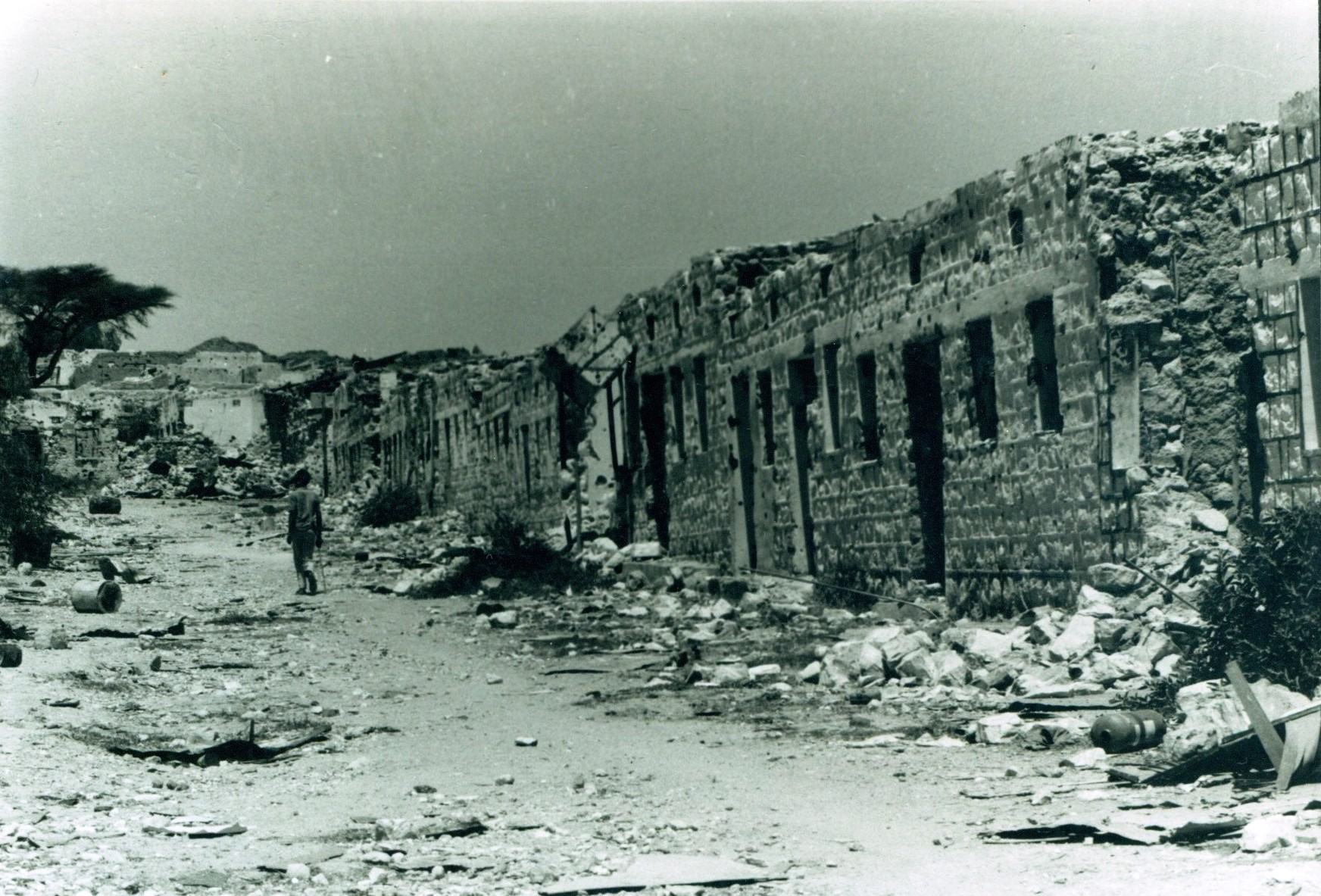
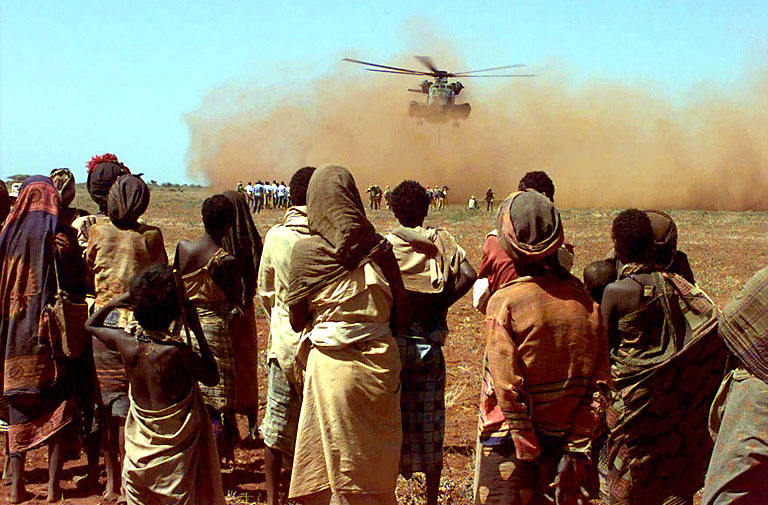
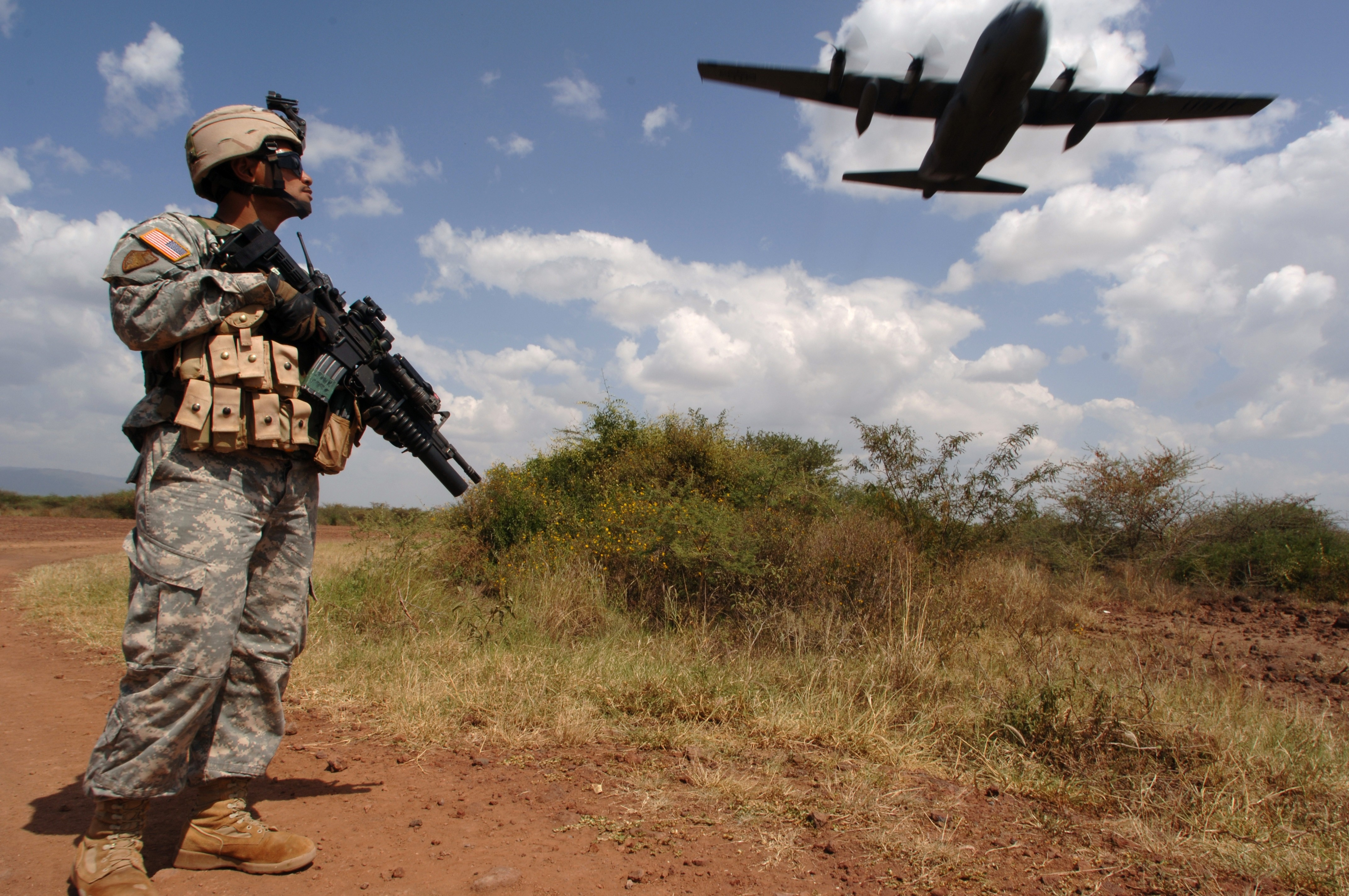
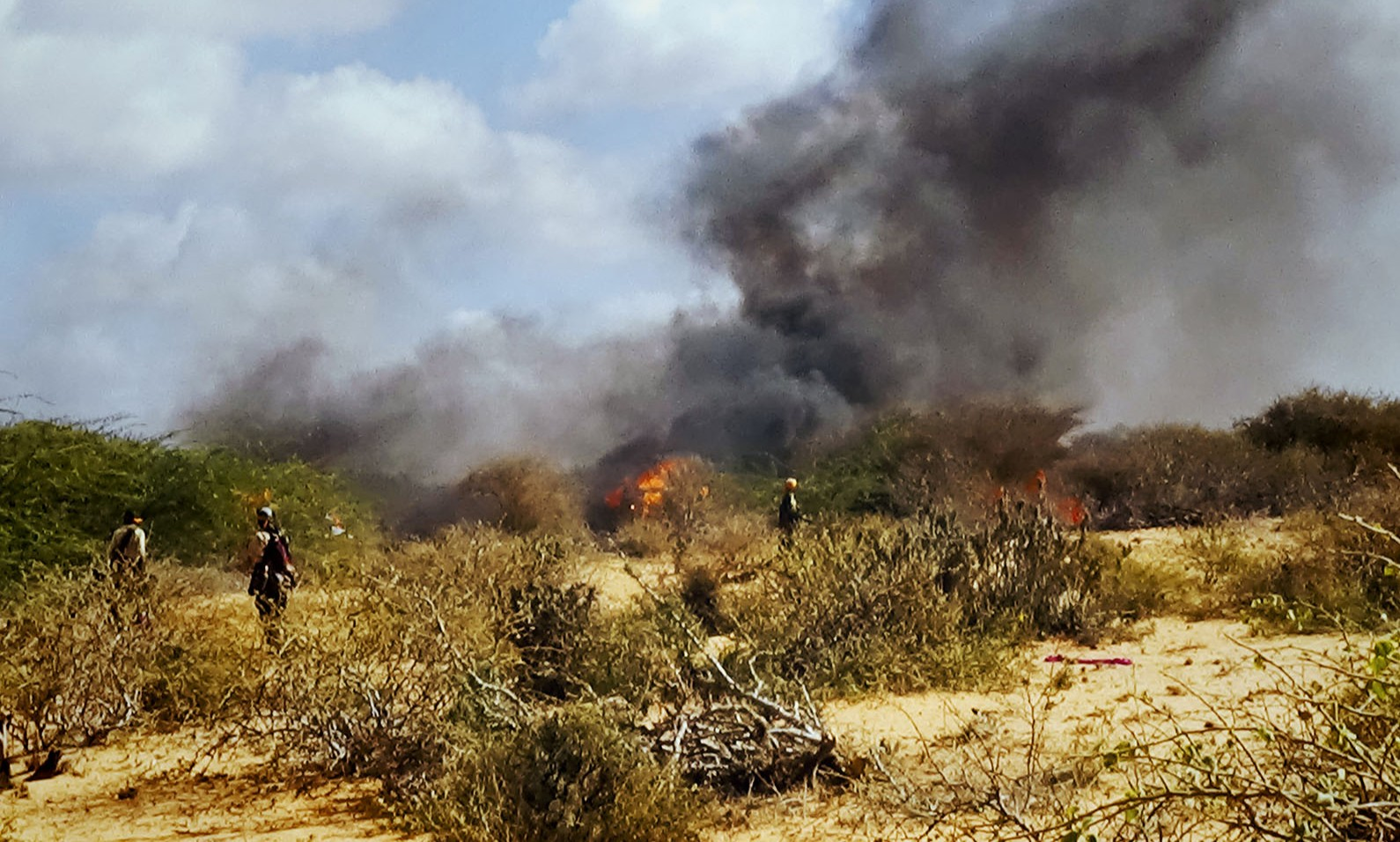
- From top to bottom, left to right: Map of the current phase, March 2026; Super Six-Four, one of the Black Hawks shot down during the Battle of Mogadishu (1993); Destruction in Hargeisa during Somaliland War of Independence; an American helicopter delivering wheat donated by the Australian Government during a famine in 1992; U.S. military forces transporting supplies with a C-130 at a remote airstrip in southern Ethiopia during the 2006 Ethiopian invasion; Al-Shabaab militants assaulting Somali National Army positions at the Battle of Osweyne as part of the current phase of the war
Date	1978/1981/1988/1991 (disputed) – present (Note: Various start dates have been offered for when the civil war in Somalia began. The Central Bank of Somalia, the United Nations, the US Office of the Secretary of Defense, and Necrometrics all assert that the conflict started in 1991, after the ouster of the Siad Barre administration. Political scientist James Fearon argues that the start of the conflict could be dated to 1981, when armed Isaaq clan militias began to launch small-scale attacks against the Barre regime and its Isaaq members, to the razing of the Isaaq majority town of Hargeisa in 1988 by state forces, or to 1991, following the collapse of the Barre administration and the commencement of interclan warfare. For analytical purposes, he settles on 1991 for the start date of a new civil war, on the grounds that the fighting had begun previously, but that a major party to the conflict was defeated. Robinson writes that the "civil war had effectively begun by 1987", referring to Compagnon.)
Location	Somalia, with spillovers in Kenya and Ethiopia
Status	Ongoing; Somaliland declares independence; Consolidation of states from 1998 to 2006; Ethiopian invasion against the Islamic Courts Union; Conflict between radical Islamists and the government continues; New government formed in 2012; Las Anod conflict between Somaliland and SSC-Khatumo begins in 2023; Ongoing constitutional crisis in Somalia since 2023

Belligerents
1978–1991: (Somalia) Somali Democratic Republic	1978–1991: (Somalia) USC; SSDF; SPM; Ethiopia	1978–1991: Somali National Movement
1991–1995: United Nations; UNOSOM I; UNITAF; UNOSOM II	1991–1995: (Somalia) SNA; Al-Itihaad al-Islamiya	1991–1995: Somaliland
1995–2006: (Somalia) IGS (Somalia) TNG	1995–2006: (Somalia) SRRC; SPM Islamic Courts Union	1995–2006: Somaliland
2006–2009: Ethiopia (Somalia) TFG; Puntland; United States	2006–2009: Islamic Courts Union al-Shabaab; ICU loyalists (Somalia) ARS; RKB; JABISO; Muaskar Anole	2006–2009: Somaliland
2009–present: Somalia; TFG; Federal Government; United States; China; Turkey; African Union; AMISOM; ATMIS; AUSSOM; Somali Future Council; Puntland; Jubaland; (South West State of Somalia) Laftagareen loyalists	2009–present: Al-Qaeda; al-Shabaab; Somali pirates; Islamic State (since 2015); Somalia Province	2009–present: Somaliland

Strength
(Somalia) approx. 15,000 (2020; possibly over 30,000 as of 2022); 8,000–10,000 Ma'awisley (2023); ~11,900 personnel; 2,500; 1,410; 4,500; 1,520; 1,091; 2,000 (2013); 1,000 (2010) (United States) ~350 (2023) (Puntland) (Jubaland) ~15,800	7,000–12,000 (2022); 1,200 foreign mujahideen (2011); (Islamic State) 300–500 (mid-2024)	6,000–8,000 soldiers 1,000–2,000 officers 6,000 (2025)

Casualties and losses
- Casualties: 350,000–1,000,000+ killed (1991–2022); 50,000–200,000 killed in Isaaq genocide (1987–1989); 200,000–300,000 indirect deaths (1992); Displaced: 2,000,000–3,800,000 displaced

The Somali Civil War (Somali: Dagaalkii Sokeeye ee Soomaaliya; Arabic: الحرب الأهلية الصومالية al-ḥarb al-’ahliyya aṣ-ṣūmāliyya) is an ongoing civil war that is taking place in Somalia. It grew out of resistance to the military junta led by Siad Barre during the 1980s.

From 1988 to 1990, the Somali Armed Forces began engaging in combat against various armed rebel groups, including the Somali Salvation Democratic Front in the northeast, the Somali National Movement in the Somaliland War of Independence in the northwest, and the United Somali Congress in the south. The clan-based armed opposition groups overthrew the Barre government in 1991.

Various armed factions began competing for influence in the power vacuum and turmoil that followed, particularly in the south. In 1990–92, customary law temporarily collapsed, and factional fighting proliferated. In the absence of a central government, Somalia became a "failed state". This precipitated the arrival of UNOSOM I UN military observers in July 1992, followed by the larger UNITAF and UNOSOM II missions. Following an armed conflict between Somali insurgents and UNOSOM II troops during 1993, the UN withdrew from Somalia in 1995.

After the central government's collapse and the withdrawal of UN forces, there was some return to customary and religious law in most regions. In 1991 and 1998, two autonomous regional governments were also established in the northern part of the country: Somaliland and Puntland. In the south Islamic Sharia courts began proliferating in response to lawlessness. This led to a relative decrease in the intensity of the fighting, with the Stockholm International Peace Research Institute removing Somalia from its list of major armed conflicts for 1997 and 1998.

In 2000, the Transitional National Government was established, followed by the Transitional Federal Government (TFG) in 2004. The trend toward reduced conflict halted in 2005, and sustained and destructive conflict took place in the south in 2005–07, but the battle was of a much lower scale and intensity than in the early 1990s.

In 2006, Ethiopian troops invaded Somalia to depose the Islamic Courts Union (ICU) and install the TFG. The ICU effectively disintegrated, and soon after a large scale insurgency began against the occupation as other Islamist groups formed and established themselves as independent actors. Most notably Al-Shabaab rose to prominence in this period, and has since been fighting the Somali government and the AU-mandated AMISOM peacekeeping force for control of the country. Somalia topped the annual Fragile States Index for six years from 2008 up to and including 2013.

In October 2011, following preparatory meetings, Kenyan troops entered southern Somalia ("Operation Linda Nchi") to fight al-Shabaab and establish a buffer zone inside Somalia. Kenyan troops were formally integrated into the multinational force in February 2012. The Federal Government of Somalia was established in August 2012, constituting the country's first permanent central government since the start of the civil war.

In 2023, the Las Anod conflict broke out in the northern part of Somalia between SSC-Khatumo and the Somaliland Army. International stakeholders and analysts subsequently began to describe Somalia as a "fragile state" that is making some progress toward stability.

== Decline and Fall of Siad Barre's government (1978–91) ==
Major General Siad Barre, Chairman of the Supreme Revolutionary Council and President of Somalia

The defeat of the Somali military at the hands of Cuban/Ethiopian forces during the Ogaden War of 1977-78 brought to the surface opposition elements within the armed forces. Another significant consequence of the war was the massive influx of refugees from the Ogaden into Somalia, estimated at over a million.

The first serious postwar challenge to the regime came during an attempted coup in April 1978. The officers were primarily from the Majeerteen clan, and many of the coup plotters fled to Ethiopia after the Somali government had put down the insurrection. After the coup attempt a former Somali army commander, Abdullahi Yusuf, setup base for a rebel organization called the Somali Salvation Democratic Front (SSDF) and soon after began fighting with Ethiopian forces against the Somali army. The SSDF possessed little autonomy over Ethiopian security forces, as it was 'created, organized, trained and financed by Ethiopia'.

With the formation of the SSDF , the era of armed opposition against the Barre regime had begun. The Ethiopian army intended to use the SSDF to overthrow Barre and install a friendly regime. In response to rising dissent, the Somali government violently suppressed opposition movements and clans perceived to be a threat with the military and elite security forces. The government initiated a harsh policies with the aim of depriving the rebels of political and social support. Whenever the SSDF launched attacks, the regime retaliated by rounding up hundreds of Majerteen (who formed the core of the SSDF) and purging the civil service.

In mid-1982, the Ethiopian army and SSDF rebels invaded Somalia. According to Gérard Prunier, "The plan was to cut Somalia into two by driving the troops all the way to the ocean, but the plan backfired." In spite of losses taken four years earlier during the Ogaden War, the Somali army had regrouped and the invasion led to a large increase in volunteers joining the army. The Ethiopian/SSDF attack had played out to Barres advantage, as his declining regime found a significant upsurge in support. After the border war, Barre successfully split the SSDF and most its members surrendered to the government following an amnesty and payment offer.

By the mid-1980s, more resistance movements supported by Ethiopia had sprung up across the country. Barre responded by ordering punitive measures against those he perceived as supporting the guerrillas, especially in the north.

In May 1986, Barre suffered serious injuries in a car crash near Mogadishu, when the car transporting him smashed into the back of a bus during a heavy rainstorm. Lieutenant General Mohamed Ali Samatar, then Vice President, served as de facto head of state for the next several months. Although Barre managed to recover enough to present himself for reelection to a seven-year term on December 23, 1986, his poor health and advanced age led to speculation about who would succeed him.

In an effort to hold on to power, Barre's ruling Supreme Revolutionary Council (SRC) became increasingly totalitarian and arbitrary. This caused opposition to his government to grow. Barre tried to quell the unrest by abandoning appeals to nationalism, relying more and more on his own inner circle, and exploiting historical clan animosities.

In December 1981, unrest was triggered in Northern Somalia by the arrest of 30 Isaaq professionals in Hargeisa who created a self-help group to improve local facilities. This was followed by the systematic efforts to remove all Isaaqs from positions of power including the military, judiciary and security services, as well as harsh policies enacted against the Isaaq, including a declaration of economic warfare on the Isaaq. The transfer of power to non-Isaaq pro-government individuals further pushed Isaaq communities to rebel against Barre's regime and was one of the main causes of the breakout of the Somaliland War of Independence.

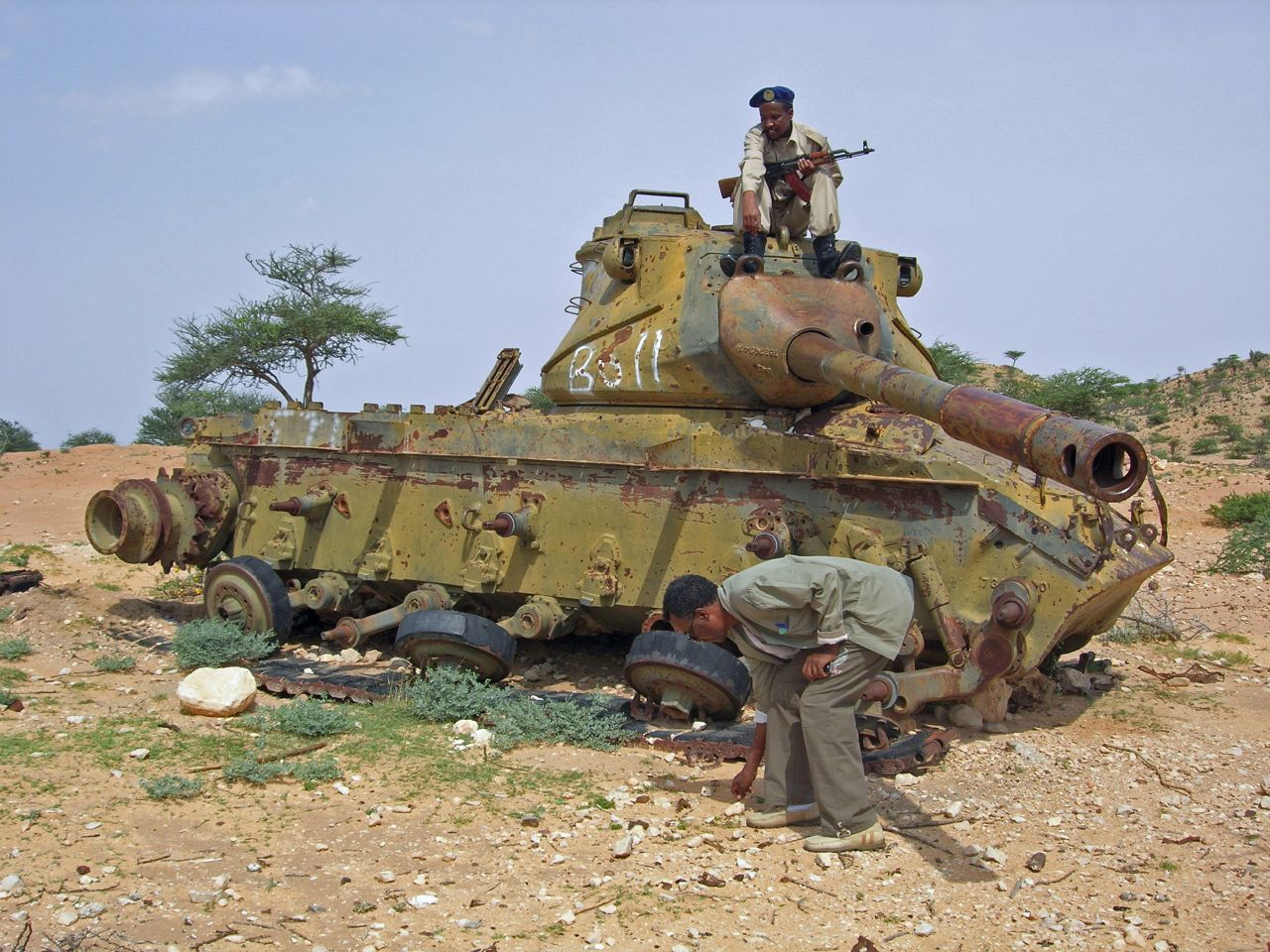
A destroyed M47 Patton in Somaliland, left behind wrecked from the Somaliland War of Independence

In 1988, Siad Barre and Ethiopian dictator Mengistu Haile Mariam agreed to a secret deal whereby each would cease hosting insurgencies of one another. This prompted the Somali National Movement (SNM) to launch an offensive on Northern Somalia from its bases on the Ethiopian border. Barre's regime responded with "systematic" human rights abuses and the genocide of thousands of Isaaq tribesmen resulting in up to 200,000 civilians slaughtered and 500,000 more people seeking refuge in neighbouring Ethiopia.

The clampdown initiated by Barre's government extended its reach beyond the initial bombings in the north to encompass various regions across the country. This reproduction of aggressive strategies aimed at stifling dissent and retaining authority over the populace was a hallmark of the government's repressive actions in the South. One of the most notable instances occurred in 1991, when Barre's regime initiated an aerial assault that led to the deaths of numerous innocent individuals in the town of Beledwene, situated in southern Somalia.

Another notable instance of Barre's repressive policies occurred in the city of Baidoa, which earned the nickname 'the city of death' due to the events that unfolded there during the famine and civil war. Hundreds of thousands of individuals lost their lives as a consequence of governmental strategies specifically aimed at the Rahanweyn community residing in these areas.

In response to these humanitarian abuses, Western aid donors cut funding to the Somali regime which, at the time, was heavily reliant on foreign aid. This resulted in a rapid "retreat of the state", accompanied by a severe drop in value for the Somali Shilling and mass military desertion by Somali army units.

In 1990, as fighting intensified, Somalia's first President, Aden Abdullah Osman Daar, and about 100 other Somali politicians signed a manifesto advocating reconciliation. A number of the signatories were subsequently arrested. Barre's heavy-handed tactics further strengthened the appeal of the various rebel movements, although these groups' only common goal was the overthrow of his government.

== Collapse of the Somali state ==
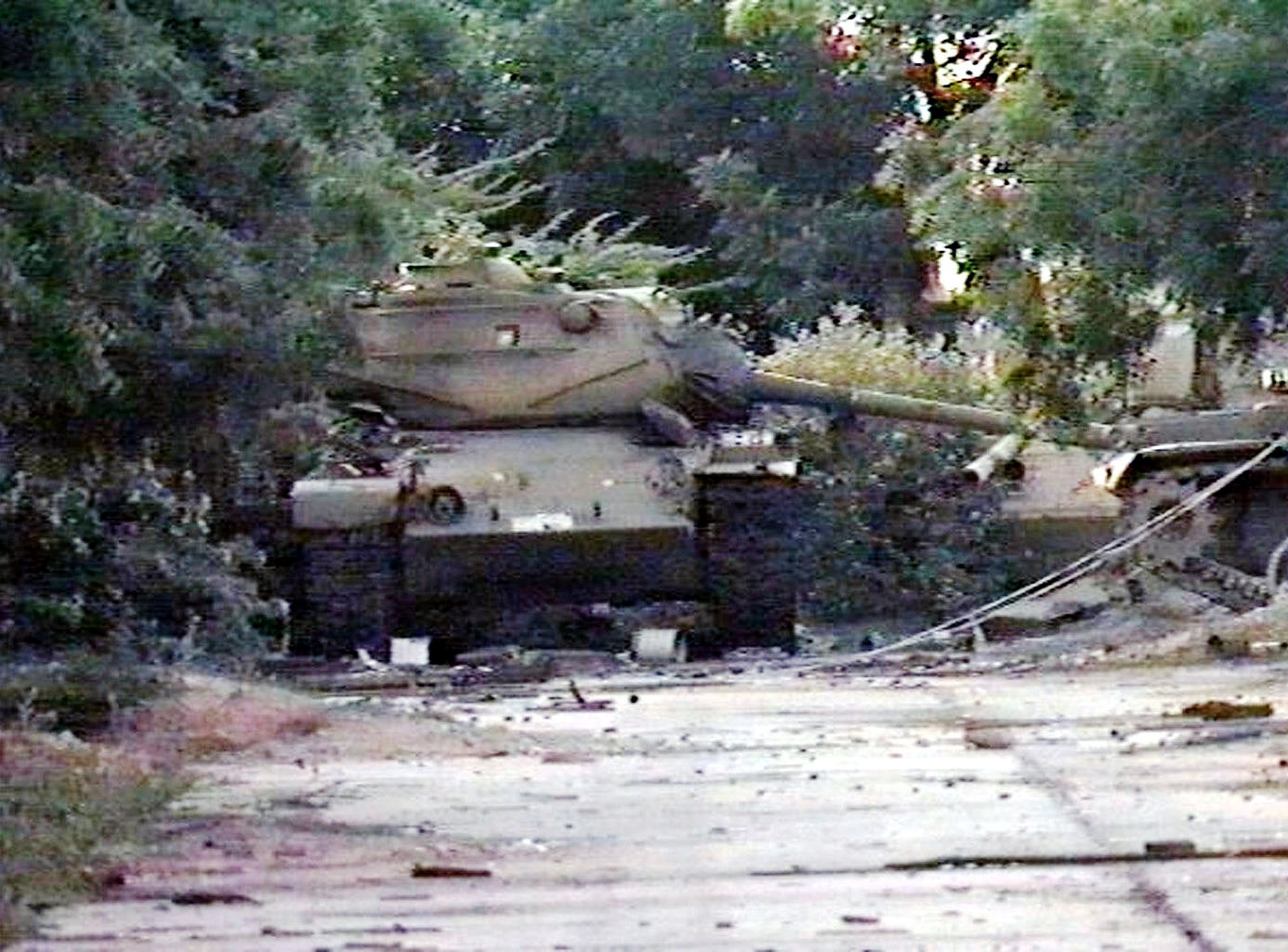
Three knocked-out Somali National Army (SNA) M47 Patton medium tanks left abandoned near a warehouse, photographed by U.S. forces in December 1993

By mid-1990, United Somali Congress (USC) rebels had captured most towns and villages surrounding Mogadishu, which prompted some to give Barre the ironic title 'Mayor of Mogadishu.' In December the USC entered Mogadishu. Four weeks of battle between Barre's remaining troops and the USC ensued, during which the USC brought more forces into the city. By January 1991, USC rebels defeated the Red Berets, Barre's special forces, toppling Barre's hold on the government. The remainder of the government's forces then finally collapsed. Some became irregular regional forces and clan militias.

In January 1991, in one of the final episodes of the civil war in the north, SNM militia gave chase to retreating government forces (26th Division) to the town of Dilla, where a battle took place and the town was destroyed. SNM militia then continued into Borama, the capital and largest town of Awdal, but the SNM leadership withdrew units within 24 hours to allow discussions to take place without the threat of occupation. By February the SNM controlled the north entirely.

After the USC's victory over Barre's troops, the other rebel groups declined to cooperate with it, as each instead drew primary support from its own constituency. Among these other opposition movements were the Somali Patriotic Movement (SPM) and Somali Democratic Alliance (SDA), a Gadabuursi group which had been formed in the northwest to counter the Somali National Movement Isaaq militia. For its part, the SNM initially refused to accept the legitimacy of the provisional government that the USC had established, but in March 1991 the SNM's former leader Ahmed Mohamed Silanyo proposed a power-sharing framework between the SNM and USC under a new transitional government.

Many of the opposition groups subsequently began competing for influence in the power vacuum that followed the ousting of Barre's government. In the south, armed factions led by USC commanders General Mohamed Farah Aidid and Ali Mahdi Mohamed, in particular, clashed as each sought to exert authority over the capital.

In the northwest, at the Burao conference of April–May 1991, the SNM declared an independent Republic of Somaliland in the region that had constituted the British Somaliland before independence and unification with the former colony of Italian Somaliland in 1960 electing Abdirahman Ahmed Ali Tuur as president.

Violence flared up in Mogadishu on 17 November 1991, when the Aidid-aligned faction of the USC attacked Mahdi-aligned forces in the city. They seized part of the city, but could not push Mahdi's forces out of northern Mogadishu. In 1992, after four months of heavy fighting for control of Mogadishu, a ceasefire was agreed between Ali Mahdi Mohamed and Mohamed Farah Aideed. Neither had seized control of the capital, and as a result, a 'greenline' was established between east and west that divided their areas of control.

== United Nations intervention (1992–1995) ==
UN Security Council Resolution 733 and UN Security Council Resolution 746 led to the creation of the United Nations Operation in Somalia I (UNOSOM I), to provide humanitarian relief and help restore order in Somalia after the dissolution of its central government. The political state was described by the UN’s summary as being chaos with a deteriorating security system and widespread death and destruction.

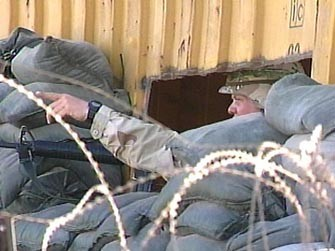
An American soldier at the main entrance to the Port of Mogadishu points to identify a sniper's possible firing position (January 1994).

United Nations Security Council Resolution 794 was unanimously passed on December 3, 1992, which approved a coalition of United Nations peacekeepers led by the United States. Forming the Unified Task Force (UNITAF), the alliance was tasked with assuring security until humanitarian efforts aimed at stabilizing the situation were transferred to the UN. Landing in 1993, the UN peacekeeping coalition started the two-year United Nations Operation in Somalia II (UNOSOM II) primarily in the south. UNITAF's original mandate was to use "all necessary means" to guarantee the delivery of humanitarian aid in accordance to Chapter VII of the United Nations Charter. Whereas the aim of UNOSOM 1 was primarily humanitarian UNITAFs mission statement to restore "peace, stability, law and order" suggests their belief of Somalia’s incapacity to secure the safety of the population without assistance from international military.

During negotiations from 1993 to 1995, Somali principals had some success in reconciliation and establishment of public authorities. Among these initiatives was the Mudug peace agreement of June 1993 between Aidid's forces and the SSDF, which established a ceasefire between the Haber Gedir and the Majeerteen clans, opened the trade routes, and formalized the withdrawal of militants from Galkayo; the UNOSOM-mediated Hirab reconciliation of January 1994 in Mogadishu between elders of the rival Abgal and Haber Gedir clans, which was backed by politicians from these constituencies and concluded with a pact to end hostilities, dismantle the green line partitioning the city, and remove road blocks; the UNOSOM-mediated Kismayo initiative of 1994 between the SNA, SPM, SSDF, and representatives of nineteen clans from the southern Lower Juba and Middle Juba regions; the 1994 Bardhere conference between the Marehan and Rahanweyn (Digil and Mirifle), which resolved conflicts over local resources; and the short-lived Digil-Mirifle Governing Council for the southern Bay and Bakool regions, which was established in March 1995.

Major disagreements between the UN and the Somali National Alliance, led by Mohamed Farah Aidid, began soon after the establishment of UNOSOM II, centering on the perceived true nature of the operations political mandate.

In mid-1993 relations between the two parties significantly deteriorated and escalated into war. Many Mogadishu residents were deeply disturbed by the effects of heavy weaponry utilized by UN forces in Mogadishu, such as AC-130s, helicopter gunships, wire-guided TOW missiles and rockets. The UNOSOM counterinsurgency effort had significant negative political consequences for the intervention as it alienated much of the Somali population, strengthened political support for Aidid, and led to growing criticism of the operation internationally.

As a result numerous UNOSOM II contingents began to increasingly push for a more conciliatory and diplomatic approach with the SNA. After the Battle of Mogadishu in October 1993, UN soldiers eventually withdrew altogether from the country on March 3, 1995.

A 1995 Amnesty International report concluded that the UN operation in Somalia had demonstrated a poor record of promoting and protecting human rights, which consequently severely impede its ability to function. The UN stated that their withdrawal without completing their mandate was due to a lack of progress towards peace and little cooperation with Somali parties over security issues which were continually undermined. They received significant backlash after this withdrawal prompting them to state they were not abandoning Somalia however provided little international military support until the formation of the more local military operation AMISOM in 2007.

== USC/SSA (1995–2000) ==
UNOSOM II's departure in early 1995 did not result in the eruption of violence that was widely predicted, though the civil war continued to simmer with occasional clashes between factions. The withdrawal led to the formation of local administrations gaining momentum throughout Somalia, such as district/neighborhood level Islamic Courts and regional administrations like Puntland, resulting in period of relative stability and economic growth until the early 2000's.

Somali political science professor Hussein Adam observed of the period, "With the collapse of UNOSOM-sponsored institutions, more authentic entities, including authoritative local leaders, have emerged. With the distorting effect of UNOSOM no longer present, the process of both political and economic transformation has been facilitated...alternative institutions have emerged without any external support."

Aidid subsequently declared himself President of Somalia on June 15, 1995. However, his declaration received no recognition, as his rival Ali Mahdi Muhammad had already been elected interim President at a conference in Djibouti and recognized as such by the international community.

Consequently, Aidid's faction continued its quest for hegemony in the south. In September 1995, militia forces loyal to him attacked and occupied the city of Baidoa. Aidid's forces remained in control of Baidoa from September 1995 to at least January 1996, while the local Rahanweyn Resistance Army militia continued to engage his forces in the town's environs.

Fighting continued in the later half of 1995 in southern Kismayo and the Juba Valley, as well as southwestern and central Somalia. However, despite these pockets of conflict, the Gedo and Middle Shabelle regions, and northwestern parts of the country remained relatively peaceful. A number of the regional and district administrations that had been locally established in the preceding few years continued to operate in these areas. In 1994–95, factions contending for power in the newly-declared-independent Somaliland region included the United Somalia Front, the Somalia Democratic Front, the Somali National Movement, and the United Somali Party.

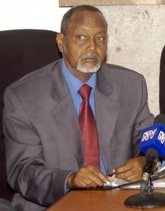
Hasan Muhammad Nur Shatigadud, leader of the Rahanweyn Resistance Army

In March 1996, Ali Mahdi was elected chairman of the United Somali Congress/Somali Salvation Alliance (USC/SSA), based in northern Mogadishu. In the southern part of city, Aidid's forces battled those of Osman Atto for control of the port of Merca as well as strategic areas in Mogadishu. Fighting in Merca eventually ended after elders intervened, but continued in Mogadishu. In August 1996, Aidid died from wounds incurred during combat in the Medina area.

In 1998, a homegrown constitutional conference was held in the northeastern town of Garowe over a period of three months. It was attended by the area's political elite, traditional elders (Issims), members of the business community, intellectuals and other civil society representatives. The Puntland State of Somalia was subsequently established.

In 1999, Eritrea was alleged to be supporting Somali National Alliance forces led by the late Aidid's son Hussein Farrah Aidid. Aidid Jr. denied the claims, saying that the Ethiopian Prime Minister Meles Zenawi had requested that he mediate between Ethiopia and Eritrea in their separate conflict. However the International Institute for Strategic Studies separately reported that Hussein Aideed himself had acknowledged support from both Eritrea and Uganda. Aideed's forces occupied Huddur and Baidoa. However, they were driven out by the Rahanweyn Resistance Army in June 1999. By the end of the year, the Rahanweyn Resistance Army had taken control of the Bay and Bakool provinces. The RRA's leader Hasan Muhammad Nur Shatigadud subsequently established the Southwestern State of Somalia regional administration.

In 2000, Ali Mahdi participated in another conference in Djibouti. He lost a re-election bid there to Barre's former Interior Minister Abdiqasim Salad Hassan.

== Transitional governments, Islamic Courts Union, and Ethiopian invasion (2000–2009) ==
In 2000, the first attempt at reestablishing a central authority, Transitional National Government (TNG) was established under President Abdiqasim Salad Hassan. Neighboring Ethiopia immediately opposed the TNG, fearing renewed claims on the Ogaden region. Ethiopia actively sponsored the formation of opposition alliances to preserve its strategic interests. Most notably, it helped create a warlord coalition called the Somalia Reconciliation and Restoration Council (SRRC) which was founded in Ethiopia during mid-2001. The SRRC served as the main political and military opposition to the Somali government. Ethiopia also claimed the TNG of President Abdiqasim was staffed by members of Al-Ittihad Al-Islamiya, and after the 9/11 attacks, Addis Ababa openly accused the TNG leadership of being Islamic extremists who were pro-Bin Laden.

According to academics Ashley Elliot and Georg-Sebastian Holzer, "Ethiopia’s success in undermining the nascent interim government proved that Addis Ababa effectively exercised the power of veto over the political direction of its disorderly neighbour."

After the TNG had failed, the Ethiopians heavily backed the formation of the new Transitional Federal Government (TFG) in 2004 and Abdullahi Yusuf's presidency on the grounds that he would give up Somalia's long standing claim to the Ogaden. Yusuf was previously a member of an Ethiopian-backed coalition of warlords that had undermined the TNG, and decades prior to that had led Somali rebels who assisted invading Ethiopian troops during the 1982 Ethiopian–Somali war.

The TFG was formed abroad in Kenya during 2004. With significant Ethiopian support, Abdullahi Yusuf was elected as the TFG president under a warlord-dominated government, and, under Ethiopian direction, he appointed a prime minister with connections to then-Ethiopian Prime Minister Meles Zenawi. Soon after his election President Yusuf requested 20,000 Ethiopian troops enter Somalia to back him.

A 2005 African Union fact finding mission found that the overwhelming majority of Somalis rejected troops from neighboring states entering the country. Despite significant opposition within the TFG parliament, President Yusuf made the unpopular decision to invite Ethiopian troops to prop up his administration. The TFG moved to the city of Baidoa in Somalia, but little authority was exercised and internal divisions were so serious that open warfare almost broke out between TFG factions in late 2005.

During mid-2006, the ascendant Islamic Courts Union decisively defeated a CIA backed alliance of Somali warlords and became the first organization since the collapse of the state in 1991 to control Mogadishu, which propelled the ICU on the national stage for the first time. The leadership of ICU were infuriated by the TFG administration's push to deploy foreign troops, insisting that only a homegrown solution could address Somalia's problems.

In June 2006 the Ethiopian invasion of Somalia began with the dispatch of several thousand troops around Baidoa city located in Bay region, far inside Somalia, in order to build a bridgehead for a future large scale military operation. Professor Abdi Ismail Samatar observed that the Ethiopian army had complete control over the TFG headquarters and had begun arming the warlords defeated by the ICU. Numerous TFG parliamentarians resigned in protest of the Ethiopian invasion, and by August 2006 the government was mired in a severe internal crisis and at risk of collapse.

In December 2006, Ethiopian troops entered Somalia to assist the TFG against the advancing Islamic Courts Union, initially winning the Battle of Baidoa. With their support, Somali government forces recaptured the capital from the ICU. The offensive helped the TFG solidify its rule. On January 8, 2007, as the Battle of Ras Kamboni raged, TFG President and founder Abdullahi Yusuf Ahmed entered Mogadishu for the first time since being elected to office. But as Meckhaus writes, the TFG was seen "by most of the Mogadishu population as a puppet of Ethiopia, and uncontrolled TFG security forces became the principal sources of insecurity for the local population, engaging in kidnapping, assaults, and worse." Within weeks, an armed insurgency subsequently arose in the capital against the TFG and its Ethiopian allies. The government then relocated to the capital from its interim location in Baidoa.

The arms embargo on Somalia was amended in February 2007 to allow states to supply weapons to the TFG's security forces, provided that they received prior approval from the UN's Somalia Sanctions Committee. After long discussions, the African Union approved the initial deployment of the African Union Mission to Somalia (AMISOM) in March 2007. It established a "small triangle of protection" around Mogadishu's airport, seaport, and the Villa Somalia, and began to adopt a low-key negotiating profile with key actors.

In November 2008, following repeated violations of the weapons blockade, the Security Council decided that an arms embargo could be imposed on entities involved in such breaches. After a two-year consultation process, the TFG was formed in 2004 by Somali politicians in Nairobi under the auspices of the Intergovernmental Authority on Development (IGAD). The process also led to the establishment of the Transitional Federal Institutions (TFIs), and concluded in October 2004 with the election of Abdullahi Yusuf Ahmed as president. The TFG thereafter became Somalia's internationally recognized government.

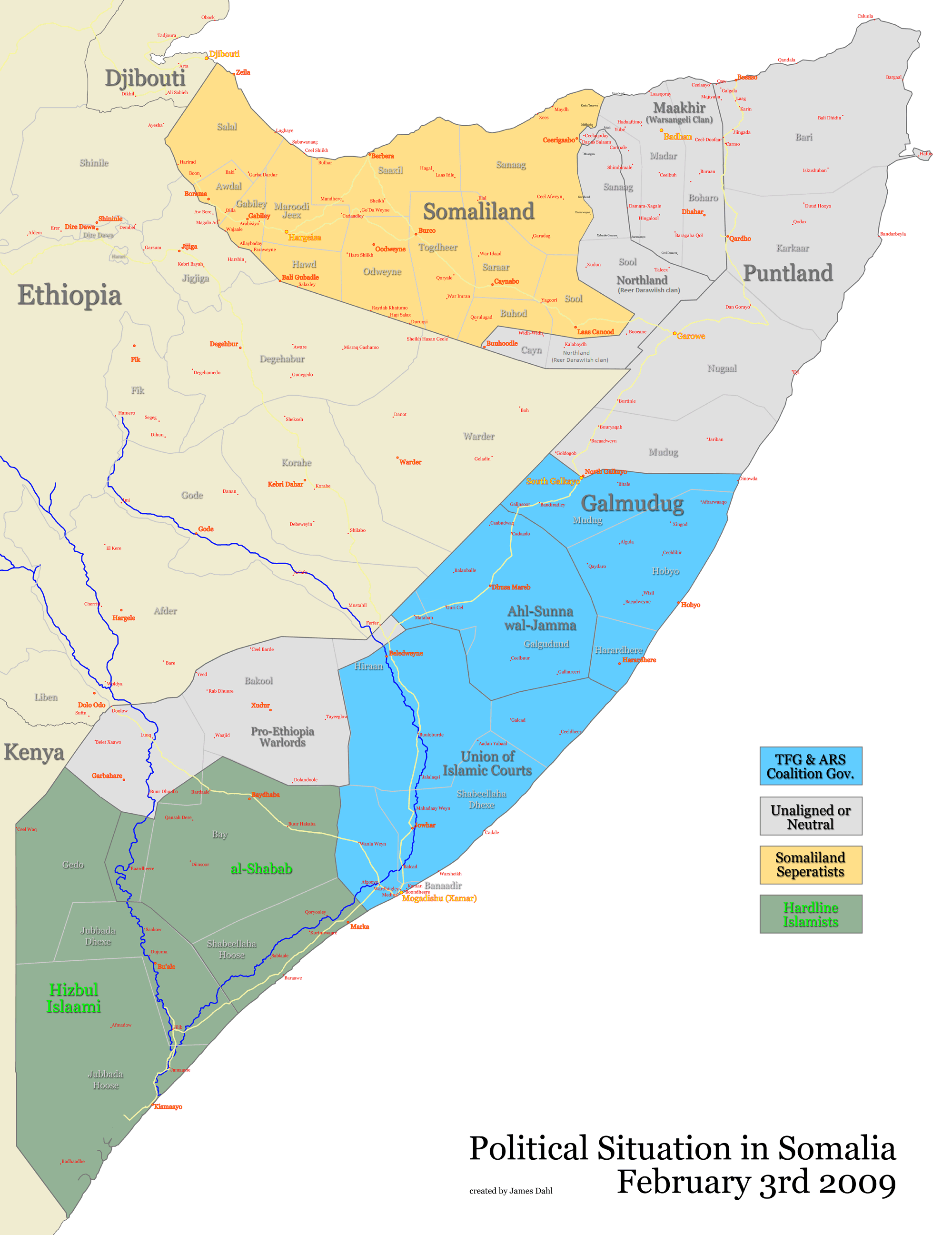
Political situation in Somalia following the Ethiopian military withdrawal, February 3, 2009

Following their defeat, the Islamic Courts Union splintered into several different factions. Some of the more radical elements, including Al-Shabaab, regrouped to continue their insurgency against the TFG and oppose the Ethiopian military's presence in Somalia. Throughout 2007 and 2008, Al-Shabaab scored military victories, seizing control of key towns and ports in both central and southern Somalia.

At the end of 2008, the group had captured Baidoa but not Mogadishu. On May 1, 2008, the U.S. made an airstrike on Dhusamareb, and followed on 3 May with another airstrike on the border town of Dobley. According to the International Crisis Group, Ethiopia's leaders were surprised by the insurgency's persistence and strength and frustrated at the TFG's chronic internal problems. By January 2009, Al-Shabaab and other militias had forced the Ethiopian troops to retreat, leaving behind an understaffed African Union peacekeeping force.

Due to a lack of funding and human resources, an arms embargo that made it difficult to re-establish a national security force, and general indifference on the part of the international community, President Yusuf found himself obliged to deploy thousands of troops from Puntland to Mogadishu to sustain the battle against insurgent elements in the southern part of the country. Financial support for this effort was provided by the autonomous region's government. This left little revenue for Puntland's own security forces and civil service employees, leaving the territory vulnerable to piracy and terrorist attacks.

On December 29, 2008, Abdullahi Yusuf Ahmed announced before a united parliament in Baidoa his resignation as President of Somalia. In his speech, which was broadcast on national radio, Yusuf expressed regret at failing to end the country's seventeen-year conflict as his government had mandated to do. He also blamed the international community for its failure to support the government, and said that the speaker of parliament would succeed him in office per the charter of the Transitional Federal Government.

The battle flag of Al-Shabaab, an Islamist group waging war against the federal government

== Coalition government (2009) ==
Between May 31 and June 9, 2008, representatives of Somalia's federal government and the Alliance for the Re-liberation of Somalia (ARS) participated in peace talks in Djibouti brokered by Ahmedou Ould-Abdallah, the Special Representative of the Secretary General for Somalia. The conference ended with a signed agreement calling for the withdrawal of Ethiopian troops in exchange for the cessation of armed confrontation. Parliament was subsequently expanded to 550 seats to accommodate ARS members, which then elected Sheikh Sharif Sheikh Ahmed, the former ARS chairman, to office. President Sharif shortly afterwards appointed Omar Abdirashid Ali Sharmarke, the son of slain former President Abdirashid Ali Sharmarke, as the nation's new Prime Minister.

With the help of AMISOM, the coalition government also began a counteroffensive in February 2009 to assume full control of the southern half of the country. To solidify its rule, the TFG formed an alliance with the Islamic Courts Union, other members of the Alliance for the Re-liberation of Somalia, and Ahlu Sunna Waljama'a, a moderate Sufi militia. Furthermore, Al-Shabaab and Hizbul Islam, the two main Islamist groups in opposition, began to fight amongst themselves in mid-2009.

As a truce, in March 2009, Somalia's coalition government announced that it would re-implement shari'a as the nation's official judicial system. However, conflict continued in the southern and central parts of the country. Within months, the coalition government had gone from holding about 70% of south-central Somalia's conflict zones, territory which it had inherited from the previous Yusuf administration, to losing control of over 80% of the disputed territory to the Islamist insurgents.

== Since 2009 ==
In November 2010, a new technocratic government was elected to office, which enacted numerous reforms. Among these, in its first 50 days in office, the new administration completed its first monthly payment of stipends to government soldiers. This government subsequently began to push back Al-Shabaab over the following years.

On August 6, 2011, Al-Shabaab was forced to withdraw from most of Mogadishu. Al-Shabaab did still retain a foothold in the northern outskirts of the capital, but by January 2012, the combined efforts of Somali government and AMISOM forces had expelled them from the city completely. An ideological rift within Al-Shabaab's leadership also emerged after the 2011 drought and the assassination of top officials in the organization.

With the majority of Mogadishu secure, the Somali Armed Forces and Kenya Defence Forces next launched Operation Linda Nchi, a joint advance against Al-Shabaab, in October 2011. This operation had reportedly been planned for nearly two years, during which time Kenyan officials sought U.S. support for the mission. After the successful conclusion of Operation Linda Nchi in May 2012, Kenyan troops were formally integrated into AMISOM in June. After Operation Linda Nchi, the port city of Kismayo was the last major stronghold that remained in Al-Shabaab's control. A Kenyan-led AMISOM force, backed by the Raskamboni movement, then launched an offensive against Kismayo on September 28, 2012. After a three-day battle, Somali government forces were able to gain control of the city. The month of September 2012 also saw the establishment of the Federal Government of Somalia.

In January 2013, AMISOM's mandate was extended for another year following the adoption of UNSC Resolution 2093. The Security Council also unanimously voted to suspend Somalia's arms embargo on light weapons for one year and welcomed the Federal Government's development of a new national security strategy, urging the central authorities to accelerate the plan's implementation, further define the Somali national security forces' composition, and identify capability gaps to assist their international partners in better addressing them. While many urban areas had been seized, Al-Shabaab still controlled many rural areas, where a number of their operatives disappeared into local communities in order to more effectively exploit any mistakes by the central authorities.

In October 2013, the U.S. Africa Command began establishing the Mogadishu Coordinating Cell, which became fully operational in late December. The unit was formed at the request of the Somali government and AMISOM, who had approached U.S. Department of Defense Secretary Chuck Hagel in September about the possibility. It consists of a team of fewer than five advisers, including planners and communicators between the Somali authorities and AMISOM. The cell is intended to provide consultative and planning support to the allied forces to enhance their capacity and promote peace and security throughout the country and region. In November 2013, a senior Ethiopian government official announced that Ethiopia's troops deployed in Somalia would soon join AMISOM, having already forwarded a request to do so. At the time, an estimated 8,000 Ethiopian soldiers were stationed in the country. The Somali Foreign Ministry welcomed the decision, asserting that the move would galvanize AMISOM's campaign against Al-Shabaab.

Following the adoption of UN Security Council Resolution 2124, which authorized the deployment of 4,000 additional troops to augment AMISOM's 22,126 strong force, Ethiopian troops formally joined the mission in January 2014. They are mandated to work alongside the Somali National Army, with responsibility for the allied forces' operations in the southern Gedo, Bakool and Bay regions. The Ethiopian troops represent AMISOM's sixth contingent after the Djibouti, Burundi, Sierra Leone, Kenya and Uganda units.

In January 2014, at an African Union Summit in Addis Ababa, President Hassan Sheikh Mohamud requested an extension of the UN Security Council's weapons purchasing mandate for Somalia after its March expiration, saying that the Somali defence forces required better military equipment and arms to more effectively combat militants. The following month, the UN Somalia and Eritrea Monitoring Group reported that systematic abuses by Somali government officials had allowed weapons to be diverted away from Somalia's security forces into the hands of faction leaders and Al-Shabaab militants. The panel had observed various problems with the management of weapons and ammunition stockpiles, including difficulties by monitors in accessing local weapons stockpiles and obtaining information about the arms. The monitors also suggested that one key adviser to the president was involved in planning arms deliveries to Al-Shabaab and that shipments of weapons from Djibouti and Uganda could not be accounted for.

Somali Chief of Army Dahir Adan Elmi made a pro forma denial of the allegations. He also said that a UN monitoring team had twice visited the government's weapons and ammunition storage facilities in Mogadishu, where it was shown the arms stockpiles for inspection and had expressed satisfaction. Elmi said that the government had twice purchased weapons since the arms embargo on Somalia was partially lifted. He also asserted that Al-Shabaab already had an adequate supply of weapons and mainly utilized explosive devices and sophisticated bombs.

Political situation in Somalia in July 2017

In February 2014, a delegation led by Prime Minister of Somalia Abdiweli Sheikh Ahmed met in Addis Ababa with Ethiopian Prime Minister Hailemariam Desalegn to discuss strengthening relations between the countries. Ahmed commended Ethiopia's role in the ongoing peace and stabilization process in Somalia as well as its opposition to Al-Shabaab, and welcomed the Ethiopian military's decision to join AMISOM. Desalegn in turn pledged his administration's continued support for Somalia's peace and stabilization efforts, as well as its preparedness to assist in initiatives aiming to build up Somali security forces through experience-sharing and training. The meeting concluded with a tripartite Memorandum of Understanding agreeing to promote partnership and cooperation, including a cooperative agreement to develop the police force.

On 5 March 2014, the UN Security Council unanimously voted to extend the partial easing of the arms embargo on Somalia to 25 October. The resolution permitted the Somali government to purchase light weapons, with the stipulation that all member states must take steps to prevent the direct or indirect supply, transfer or sale of arms and military equipment to individuals or entities outside of the Somali security forces. The Somali government was also required to routinely report on the structural status of the military, as well as provide information on the extant infrastructure and protocols designed to ensure the military equipment's safe delivery, storage and maintenance.

In early March 2014, AMISOM, supported by Somali militias, launched another operation to remove Al-Shabaab from its remaining areas of control in southern Somalia. According to Prime Minister Abdiweli Sheikh Ahmed, the government subsequently launched stabilization efforts in the newly liberated areas, which included Rab Dhuure, Hudur, Wajid and Burdhubo. The Ministry of Defense provided ongoing reassurance and security to local residents, and supplied logistical and security support. Additionally, the Ministry of Interior was prepared to support and put into place programs to assist local administration and security. A Deputy Minister and several religious scholars were dispatched to all four towns to coordinate and supervise the federal government's stabilization initiatives.

By March 26, the allied forces had liberated ten towns, including Qoryoley and El Buur. UN Special Representative for Somalia Nicholas Kay described the military advance as the most significant and geographically extensive offensive since AU troops began operations in 2007.

In August 2014, the Somali government-led Operation Indian Ocean was launched, aiming to reduce insurgent-held areas along the coastline. On 1 September 2014, a U.S. drone strike carried out as part of the broader mission killed Al-Shabaab leader Muktar Abu Zubeyr. U.S. authorities hailed the raid as a major symbolic and operational loss for Al-Shabaab, and the Somali government offered a 45-day amnesty to all moderate members of the militant group.

On 15 December 2018 there were demonstrations in the city of Baidoa by supporters of Mukhtar Rowbow, a presidential candidate who had been arrested two days earlier by government forces and transferred to Mogadishu. Rowbow was a senior member of al-Shabaab. AMISOM announced that its forces did not assist in Rowbow's arrest and his transfer to Mogadishu.

From the beginning of 2020, humanitarian researchers and local medical personnel became increasingly concerned that the COVID-19 pandemic could be catastrophic for Somalis, because of the damage the civil war has wrought on Somalia's health care, and weak provision since the 1980s. On 25 November 2020, it was reported that a CIA officer had been killed in Somalia. The death came as the US administration under Donald Trump was making plans to withdraw more than 600 troops from Somalia.

President Donald Trump ordered the Department of Defense to remove the majority of the 700 U.S. troops in Somalia (many from Special Operations Command Africa) in December 2020. He changed the mission of American troops to assist the Somali Armed Forces in its fight against al-Shabaab.

When President Mohamed Abdullahi Mohamed's term expired in February 2021, dates had not been set for the election of a successor, and fighting subsequently broke out in Mogadishu. This fighting continued until May 2021, when the government and opposition agreed to hold elections within 60 days; after further negotiation, the presidential election was scheduled for October 10, and was actually held on 15 May 2022, with Hassan Sheikh Mohamud being declared the new president in a peaceful transition of power.

In March 2022, the 14-year long AMISOM mission came to an end. It was replaced by a Somali-led operation, the African Union Transition Mission in Somalia (ATMIS), and later by the African Union Support and Stabilization Mission in Somalia (AUSSOM)

In 2023, fighting broke out between the Khatumo State and Somaliland leading to the 2023 Las Anod conflict.

On May 14, 2025, in a post on social medias, Donald Trump claimed that he would "support the Somali People, who should not allow the Houthis to embed.", claiming that this initiative was "to end terrorism, and bring prosperity to their Country”.

== Casualties ==
According to Necrometrics, around 500,000 people are estimated to have been killed in Somalia since the start of the civil war in 1991. The Armed Conflict Location & Event Dataset estimates that 3,300 people were killed during the conflict in 2012, with the number of fatalities dropping slightly in 2013 to 3,150.

The United Nations Assistance Mission in Somalia reported at least 596 civilian casualties by August 2020. However, officials have struggled to maintain an accurate count due to flooding and COVID-19 deaths in the area.

== See also ==
- Somali Civil War (2009–present)
- Somali Relief and Development Society
- American military intervention in Somalia (2007–present)
- Somalia War (2006–2009)
- History of Somalia (1991–2006)
- Consolidation of states within Somalia (1998–2006)
- Factions in the Somali Civil War
- Mogadishu Line
- IIDA Women's Development Organisation
- Conflicts in the Horn of Africa

== Sources ==
- Murison, Katharine, ed. (31 October 2002). "Somalia". Africa South of the Sahara 2003. Taylor & Francis. ISBN 978-1-85743-131-5.
- Issa-Salwe, Abdisalam M. (1996). The collapse of the Somali state: the impact of the colonial legacy (PDF). London: Haan. ISBN 978-1-874209-91-1.
