= Dani Shapiro =

American writer (born 1962)

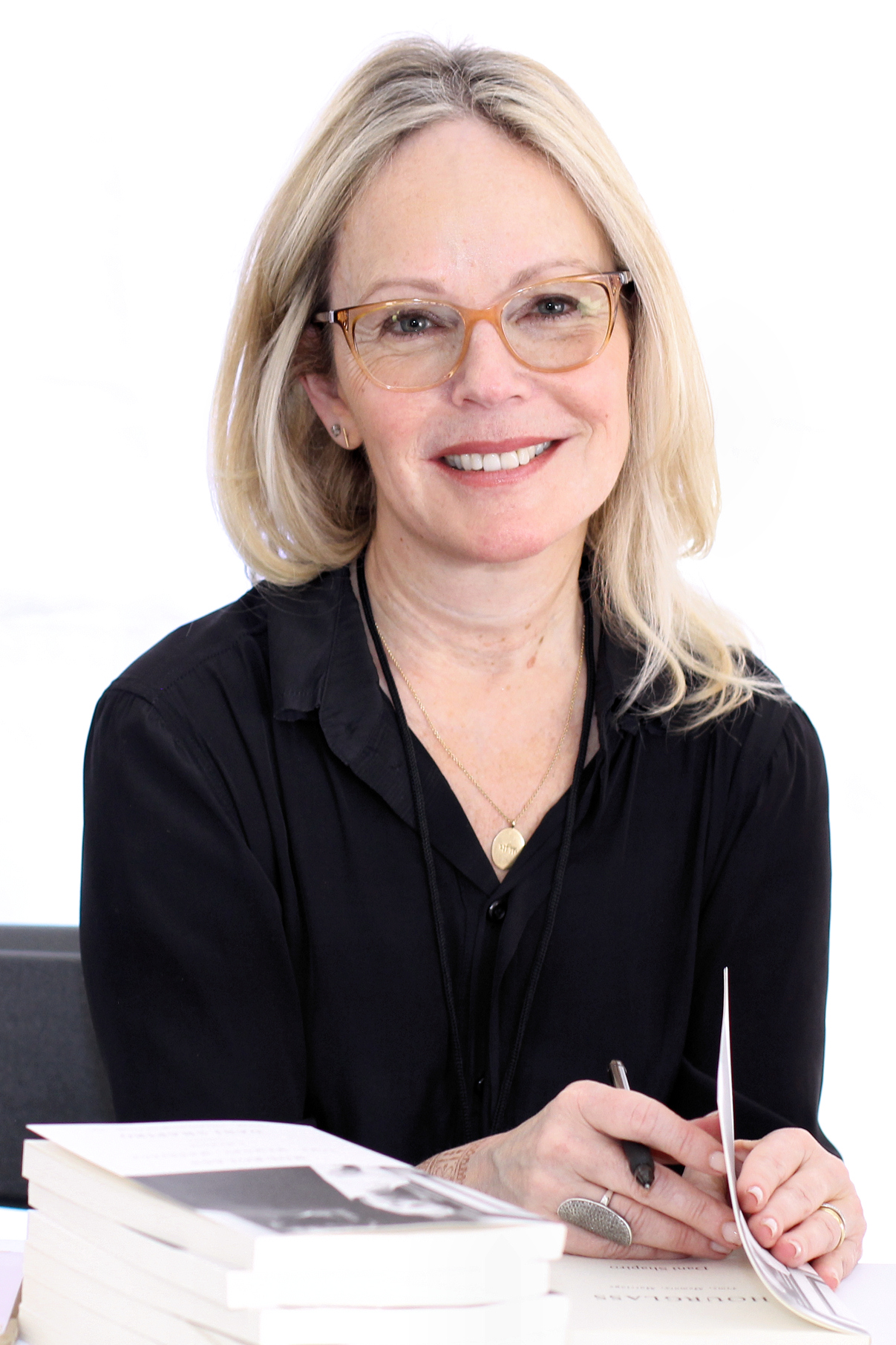
- Shapiro at the 2018 Texas Book Festival
- Born: Daneile Shapiro; April 10, 1962 (age 64); New York City
- Education: Sarah Lawrence College
- Occupations: writer, podcaster
- Spouse: Michael Maren (m. 1997)

Dani Shapiro (born April 10, 1962) is an American writer, the author of six novels including Family History (2003), Black & White (2007) and Signal Fires (2022) and the memoirs Slow Motion (1998), Devotion (2010), Hourglass (2017), and Inheritance (2019). She has also written for magazines such as The New Yorker, The Oprah Magazine, Vogue, and Elle. In February 2019, she created a podcast on iHeartRadio called Family Secrets.

== Early life and education ==
Shapiro was born Daneile Shapiro on April 10, 1962, in New York City. She is the daughter of Paul Shapiro, from an Orthodox Jewish family (who, she later learned through a recreational DNA test, was not her biological father), and Irene Shapiro, from South Jersey. Shapiro attended a Solomon Schechter Jewish day school through 6th grade, after which she attended the Pingry School in New Jersey. She attended Sarah Lawrence College, where she was taught by Grace Paley.

== Career ==
=== Writing ===
Shapiro's novels include Playing with Fire, Fugitive Blue, Picturing the Wreck, Family History, Black & White, and Signal Fires. Her best-selling memoirs include Slow Motion, Devotion, Still Writing: The Perils and Pleasures of a Creative Life, Hourglass: Time, Memory, Marriage, and most recently, Inheritance: A Memoir of Genealogy, Paternity, and Love.

In addition to The New Yorker, The Oprah Magazine, Vogue, and Elle, Shapiro's writing has also appeared in Salon, and n+1, among others.

==== Signal Fires ====
Signal Fires was named a best book of 2022 by Time, Washington Post, and others, and is a national bestseller.

Angela Haupt writes: "On a cold night in 2010, a retired doctor sits underneath an ancient oak tree with the unusual little boy who lives across the street. The boy points out the constellations, and what they represent. The man—unlike anyone else in the boy’s life—listens. Though the boy doesn't know it, this isn't the first time their lives have intersected, and they’ll soon become linked again in a way that will endure time and distance. Signal Fires, Dani Shapiro's first novel in 15 years, follows the man and his family, and the boy and his parents, across decades, lyrically examining the ways a single event can alter many lives forever."

==== Inheritance ====
In Inheritance, Shapiro writes about her experience of learning through a recreational DNA test that her biological father was not Paul Shapiro; rather, she had been conceived by the primitive practice of mixing Paul's sperm with that of an anonymous donor, whom she later was able to identify.

Inheritance debuted at number 11 on the New York Times Best Seller list and Ruth Franklin called it "beautifully written and deeply moving." The San Francisco Chronicle described Inheritance as "as compulsively readable as a mystery novel, while exploring the deeper mysteries of identity and family and truth itself… a story told with great insight and honesty and heart." Jennifer Egan wrote that "Inheritance is Dani Shapiro at her best: a gripping genetic detective story, and a meditation on the meaning of parenthood and family."

The memoir was included on several best-of-the-year lists, including that of Vanity Fair, Oprah Magazine, Lit Hub and Wired. As of 2019, Inheritance was being adapted for film by Shapiro's husband, journalist and screenwriter Michael Maren, in development with Killer Films.

=== Screenwriting ===
In 1999, Shapiro adapted Oscar Wilde's The Happy Prince for an episode of the HBO animated anthology series Happily Ever After: Fairy Tales for Every Child. In 2000, she co-wrote a screenplay based on her memoir, Slow Motion, with Michael Maren. As of 2021, Shapiro was adapting Sue Miller's novel Monogamy for film for Killer Films and Yellow Bear Films.

=== Teaching ===
Shapiro has taught writing classes and workshops at NYU, Wesleyan University and Columbia University as well Kripalu Center for Yoga and Health, 1440 Multiversity, and Fine Arts Work Center.

She also co-founded the Sirenland Writers Conference, which takes place annually in Positano, Italy.

=== Podcasting ===
In collaboration with iHeartRadio, Shapiro launched the original podcast Family Secrets in 2019. Each episode of this iTunes Top 10 podcast features a conversation between Dani and a guest who's experienced a family secret and its effects. The podcast's seventh season premiered on September 1, 2022 The podcast has more than 30 million downloads.

In addition to Family Secrets, Shapiro created and hosted another podcast with iHeartRadio, The Way We Live Now, which launched in April 2020 and concluded in July 2020. The podcast examined the way people from different walks of life coped during the COVID-19 pandemic.

== Personal life ==
Shapiro has been married to screenwriter Michael Maren since 1997, and they have a son, Jacob. In the early 2000s, Shapiro and her family moved from Brooklyn, NY to Litchfield County, Connecticut.

Shapiro wrote that in February 2024 she was diagnosed with a rare malignant tumor in the back of her eye, which she later learned would not be fatal. The diagnosis caused her to consider destroying her personal diaries—as distinguished from crafted, edited memoirs, and the treatment (surgery and radiation) altered her sight so the world appeared to her in ways she likened to Claude Monet's Impressionist style of painting.

== Books ==
- Playing with Fire Doubleday Publishing Group, 1990, ISBN 9780385267229
- Fugitive Blue Nan A. Talese, 1992, ISBN 978-0385421072
- Picturing the Wreck Doubleday, 1995, ISBN 978-0385472630
- Slow Motion: A True Story Random House, 1998 ISBN 978-0-307-82800-2
- Family History: A Novel Knopf, 2004 ISBN 978-0-307-42585-0
- Black & White Knopf, 2007 ISBN 978-1-4000-3212-9
- Devotion: A Memoir Harper, 2010 ISBN 978-0-06-162834-4
- Still Writing: The Perils and Pleasures of a Creative Life Atlantic Monthly Press, 2013 ISBN 978-0-8021-9343-8
- Hourglass: Time, Memory, Marriage Knopf, 2017 ISBN 978-0-4514-9448-1
- Inheritance: A Memoir of Genealogy, Paternity, and Love Knopf, 2019 ISBN 978-1524732714
- Signal Fires, 2022, ISBN 978-0-593-53472-4

== Appearances (selected) ==
- Oprah Winfrey's Super Soul Sunday, on the Oprah Winfrey Network, to discuss Devotion on October 20, 2013
- Today Show on NBC to discuss Inheritance on January 15, 2019
- CBS This Morning to discuss Inheritance on April 6, 2019
- PBS News Hour to discuss Inheritance on March 31, 2020

== Awards ==
- 2019: National Jewish Book Award winner in the Autobiography and Memoir category for Inheritance: A Memoir of Genealogy, Paternity, and Love
- 2019: Inheritance named a finalist for the Goodreads Choice Award in the Memoir category
- 2020: Inheritance named a finalist for the Wingate Prize for a non-fiction book "to translate the idea of Jewishness to the general reader."
- 2023: National Jewish Book Award winner in the JJ Greenberg Memorial Award for Fiction category for Signal Fires
