= Consolidation of states within Somalia (1995–2006) =

Phase during the Somali Civil War

Consolidation of States Within Somalia (1995–2006)
- Part of the Somali Civil War
Date	1995–2006
Location	Somalia
Result	Rise of the Islamic Courts Union

Belligerents
(Somalia) SNA (until 2001) (Somalia) SRRC (from 2001) SPM-Harti	(Somalia) Transitional National Government: (Somalia) USC; JVA; RRA; Jubaland Puntland Somaliland

Commanders and leaders
(Somalia) Mohamed Farrah Aidid # (Somalia) Hussein Farrah Aidid; General Morgan	(Somalia) Abdullahi Yusuf Ahmed (Somalia) Abdiqasim Salad Hassan; Hasan Muhammad Nur Shatigadud

Following the civil war and the ensuing societal chaos, some factions managed to exert a degree of authority over certain regions of Somalia where they maintained broad, clan-based support. This allowed these factions to establish working administrations and eventually coherent states, and restored order to their regions. This occurred first in Puntland, Southwestern Somalia, Galmudug, Jubaland and finally Banadir.

== Puntland ==
In 1981, three groups of Majertin anti-Siad Barre émigrés in Aden (then part of South Yemen) formed the Somali Salvation Democratic Front, with the purpose of fighting alongside Ethiopian forces in the Ogaden War against the Siad Barre regime. The invasion was withdrawn in 1982 when the United States sent emergency military aid to Somalia. The organization became divided increasingly along clan lines, leading to the imprisonment of many leading members including Abdullahi Yusuf Ahmed, and the defection of many to the Siad Barre regime. During the civil war, the SSDF began consolidating their control over the northern Mudug, Nugaal and Bari regions. The Anarchy period saw the region torn apart with internecine factional fighting, and a determined attempt by al-Ittihad al-Islami to take over the region by force from their base in Bosaso, leading to an incredibly bloody war that the SSDF won at high cost. Finally in 1998, the SSDF along with the United Somali Party and the Somali National Democratic Union agreed to form a joint administration and state, that being Puntland. Ever since then, Puntland and Somaliland have been in a sometimes-violent dispute over the primarily Darod regions of Sool and Sanaag.

== Maakhir ==
Maakhir (Makhir) is a self-proclaimed autonomous state declared on July 1, 2007 on an area "disputed" by Somaliland and Puntland. Maakhir's template of self-governance rests on the building block system endorsed by the International community as a way of reconstituting the collapsed state of Somalia. This system of local level government in Somalia is seen as a workable long-term strategy in resolving inter-clan conflicts and building institutions such as police, court system and a local military that protects and safeguards services of International NGOs as well as the provisions of United Nations Development Program. Later merged with Puntland government and joined representatives in the Puntland Parliament.

== Jubaland ==
Those factions loyal to Siad Barre, especially amongst his own Marehan clan, formed the Somali National Front after he was deposed from power, were based primarily in this region, where they withdrew to following the end of the civil war. In around Kismayo, there were fighting between the fleeing Darood sub-clans from Mogadishu for the control of the city, the northern Harti clans led by Mohamed Hersi Morgan and his militia the SPM, and the Marehan clans led by Ahmed Warsame and his militia the SNF. SPM-Harti withdrew from the city the following the loss of the war. The state of Jubaland was established on September 3, 1998, but this government survived less than a year before being driven out by the several factions of the Somali National Front, forming a new united regime over all of Jubaland, the Juba Valley Alliance on June 11, 1999. The JVA chose to join the Transitional National Government (TNG) on June 18, 2001, but in January 2006 they changed their minds and formed their own autonomous state of Jubaland. This state lasted less than a year, as the Union of Islamic Courts brought over to their side numerous factions of the JVA and took over Kismayo without firing a shot on September 24, 2006.

== Southwestern Somalia ==
The Rahanweyn clan did not take an active role in the early civil war, choosing instead to sit out the conflict. However, during the height of the Anarchy, Mohamed Farah Aideed's militias invaded Baidoa, seizing control of the most important city of the Rahanweyn, on September 17, 1995. In response to this Rahanweyn leaders met at Jhaffey on October 13, 1995 and agreed to form a united force to resist Aideed, the Rahanweyn Resistance Army (RRA). The RRA eventually chose instead to form their own state of Southwestern Somalia on April 1, 2002. The leadership first supported the Transitional National Government (TNG), but then divided over the switch to support the rival Somalia Reconciliation and Restoration Council (SRRC). Some remained loyal to the TNG movement. Both sides eventually reconciled and supported the Transitional Federal Government (TFG) and played host to them in Baidoa.

== Transitional Governments ==
There are two distinct phases of the transitional government: the Transitional National Government (TNG) and the Transitional Federal Government:

- The Transitional National Government (TNG) was formed in April–May 2000 at the Somalia National Peace Conference (SNPC) in Djibouti. It had the following:
  - 2000: Election of Abdiqasim Salad Hassan as president by the tribal/faction representatives
  - 2001: National Commission for Reconciliation and Property Settlement
  - 2002: Somali Reconciliation Conference in Eldoret, Kenya
- The Transitional Federal Government (TFG) was formed in October–November 2004 in Nairobi, Kenya with the adoption of the following Transitional Federal Institutions (TFI), all accomplished by the end of the sessions:
  - Selection of 275 Transitional Federal Parliament (TFP) members
  - Approval of the Transitional Federal Charter (TFC)
  - Election of Abdullahi Yusuf Ahmed as president by the Parliament (October 10) as head of the Transitional Federal Government (TFG) and appointment of the Council of Ministers, including Prime Minister Ali Mohammed Ghedi (November 4).

=== Transitional National Government ===
A conference in the Djibuti resort town of Arta succeeded in ending the violence between USC factions, and made strides towards unity, but failed to set up a comprehensive government. Many factions refused to attend as they could not set the terms of reconciliation, and their backer, Ethiopia, was against the TNG. These pro-Ethiopia factions formed their own pan-tribal national government movement, the Somalia Reconciliation and Restoration Council (SRRC).

=== Transitional Federal Government ===
A second attempt at forming a more comprehensive national government was undertaken in Kenya. This time the fraction leaders were allowed to set terms, and Ethiopia granted the influence it desired. The government moved to Jowhar and Abdullahi Yusuf Ahmed was elected president by the Transitional Federal Parliament (TFP), bringing Puntland into the Transitional Federal Government (TFG). Because of the terms of the reconciliation, the factions and fraction leaders remained completely autonomous fiefdoms, and the TFG became more of a Somali League of Nations in miniature, and virtually powerless. Disputes were still violently contested, such as the infighting between Mohamed Ibrahim Habsade and his fellow RRA leaders Hassan Mohamed Nuur "Shatigudud" and Adan Mohamed Nuur Madobe over control of Baidoa in 2005. All three were members of the new Parliament, and the two latter leaders were even ministers of government.

== Union of Islamic Courts ==
In 1984 two reactionary Islamist organizations, al-Jamma al-Islamiya (Islamic Association) led by Sheikh Mohammed Eissa (based in the south), and Wahdat al-Shabab al-Islam (Unity of Islamic Youth) led by Sheikh Ali Warsame, met in Burao in northern Somalia in order to form a new united organization to topple the regime of Siad Barre: al-Ittihad al-Islami. The objective of this united organization was twofold: One, to defeat Siad Barre and establish an Islamic state in Somalia and two, to unify Greater Somalia (Djibouti, northeastern Kenya, and the Somali region of Ethiopia) into this state. During the civil war, AIAI established a firm foothold in the two bastions of power of its two component parts, the Gedo region and in the northwest, and undertook a bold expansionist policy during the anarchy period, conquering their own independent territory at Bosaso in 1992. However, Ethiopia invaded Gedo several times and crushed the AIAI, occupying Gedo for several years, and SSDF succeeded in crushing the AIAI in the north in 1992/93.

The blow to the AIAI was crushing and the organization essentially dissolved into tiny independent Islamic Courts scattered throughout the areas in Somalia where Ethiopia and Puntland, or anyone else for that matter, had no influence, the lawless central region. These courts fell back on their roots as a social movement, rather than a revolutionary one, and began offering legal arbitration by Sharia and social services, slowly rebuilding their support. During this time, the courts revolutionary element was diluted by more moderate elements who were attracted primarily by the social aspects of the movement, striking a balance between the two. This state of affairs persisted for many years until 11 of these courts based in Mogadishu banded together to form the Islamic Courts Union, with a much more appealing agenda: restore law and order.

Appealing that is to everyone except the warlords, who exemplified criminal despotism, and by May 2006 the UIC was in an all out street war with the warlords, who had banded together and secured US financial backing in order to defeat them. It was not enough however, and the UIC achieved total victory on June 6, 2006. The UIC swept out of Mogadishu and linked up with independent courts throughout central Somalia, forging an administration that rapidly eclipsed all other states in Somalia by August 16, 2006.

== Galmudug ==
Various clan elders led by the Sacad subclan of the Habir Gidir declared Galmudug to be a state on August 14, 2006 in southern Galkacyo, Galinsoor and Bandiradley, which would come to encompass all of southern Mudug.

== See also ==
- War in Somalia (1992–1993)
- Somalia War (2006–2009)
- Somali Civil War (2009–present)
- Factions in the Somali Civil War
- Mogadishu Line
- Operation Deliverance
- Operation Linda Nchi
- List of conflicts in the Horn of Africa
