= Michael Maren =

American journalist, screenwriter, and director (born 1955)

- Born: Michael Maren; November 15, 1955 (age 70); Andover, Massachusetts
- Education: Columbia University (School of International and Public Affairs)
- Occupations: Journalist; screenwriter; film director
- Years active: 1990–present
- Spouse: Dani Shapiro (m. 1997)
- Children: 1
- Website: michaelmaren.com/michael-maren

Michael Maren (born November 15, 1955) is an American journalist, screenwriter, and director.

He spent seventeen years as a foreign correspondent based in Africa, writing for magazines like The Village Voice, Newsweek, The New Republic, Harper's, GQ, and The New York Times.

In 2012, he wrote and directed his first feature film, the award-winning A Short History of Decay. His latest feature film, A Little White Lie, was released in March 2023.

== Early life and education ==
Maren grew up in Andover, Massachusetts and graduated from Northfield Mt. Hermon in 1973. As an undergraduate he attended Hartwick College in Oneonta, New York. In 1984, Maren earned his master's degree from Columbia University's School of International and Public Affairs.

== Career ==
=== Aid work ===
Maren joined the Peace Corps in 1977 and served for two years teaching English and Physics at a secondary school in rural Kenya. He remained in Kenya, running the food-for-work program with the Catholic Relief Services; later he worked for the United States Agency for International Development (USAID) in Somalia, serving as a food assessment specialist on the Somali border with Ethiopia.

=== Journalistic writing ===
During his time at Columbia, Maren worked for Africa Report Magazine as a contributing editor. Later, he went on to publish articles in The Nation, The New York Times, Harper's, The Village Voice, and other publications. Much of this work centered on war and famine and the culpability of aid organizations (Private Voluntary Organizations, or PVOs); he wrote in Harper's Magazine:

Because reporters are as dependent on aid organizations as the organizations are on them. It would have been impossible, for example, for the press to cover Somalia without the assistance of PVOs. There's no Hertz counter at the Mogadishu airport, and no road maps available at gas stations. If a journalist arrives in Africa from Europe or the United States and needs to get to the interior of the country, PVOs are the only ticket. journalists sleep and eat with PVO workers. When they want history and facts and figures, they turn to the PVOs.

Maren chronicled his experiences abroad in his book, The Road to Hell: The Ravaging Effects of Foreign Aid and International Charity, published in 1997 by The Free Press. The book was called "the seminal critique of foreign aid" by The New Yorker.

=== Screenwriting ===
Maren began working as a screenwriter in 1999 and wrote scripts for HBO, Sony Pictures, and several independent producers. He has taught screenwriting at Wesleyan University, The Provincetown Fine Arts Work Center, and the Taos Writers' Conference.

In 2012, Maren wrote, directed and produced his first feature film, A Short History of Decay, which was described as "a dark comedy about stepping up when your parents are going downhill". It was released theatrically in May 2014. The New York Times called the film "well-observed" and noted its strength in portraying family relationships.

His second feature, A Little White Lie, began production in Los Angeles in February 2020. Filming was temporarily suspended in March due to COVID-19, but resumed in April 2021. The film stars Michael Shannon, Kate Hudson, Don Johnson, and Zach Braff. It was released March 3, 2023.

In March 2022, he was adapting his wife's Dani Shapiro's memoir, Inheritance, for film.

== Personal life ==
In 1997, Maren married writer Dani Shapiro. They have a son and reside in Litchfield County, Connecticut.
