= The Road to Hell (book) =

The Road to Hell: The Ravaging Effects of Foreign Aid and International Charity (The Free Press, 1997), by Michael Maren, is a book about good intentions gone awry, in the realm of charitable assistance to Africa. The author argues that the international aid industry is a big business more concerned with winning its next big government contract than helping needy people. The focus of the book is Somalia. Among the organizations criticized are World Vision, Save the Children, Christian Children's Fund, UNICEF, CARE, Catholic Relief Services, and USAID. The book argues that relief aid helped bolster the regime of Siad Barre. The book has been cited by some academics as evidence that violent competition for control over large-scale food aid contributed to the breakdown of government in Somalia.
