= Michael D. Steele =

Colonel of the US Army (born 1960)

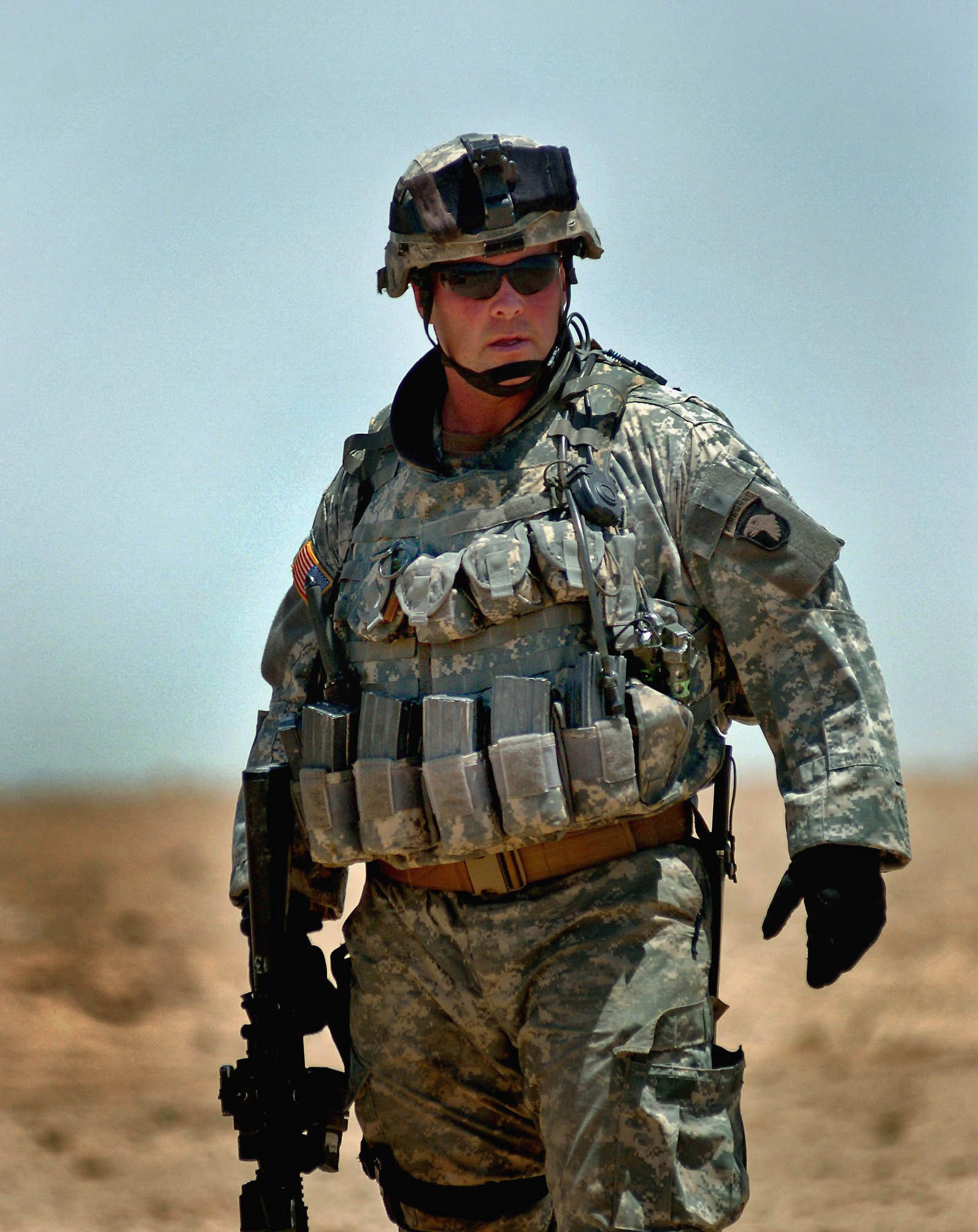
- Col. Michael Steele, commanding 3rd BCT, 101st Airborne during Operation Starlite in Salah Ah Din province, Iraq
- Born: September 15, 1960 (age 66); Statham, Georgia, U.S.
- Alma mater: University of Georgia
- Military career
- Allegiance: United States
- Branch: United States Army
- Service years: 1983–2010
- Rank: Colonel
- Unit: Berlin Brigade 75th Ranger Regiment 101st Airborne Division
- Commands: A Company, 4th Battalion, 27th Infantry Regiment; B Company, 3rd Battalion, 75th Ranger Regiment; 3rd Brigade, 101st Airborne Division; 2nd Battalion, 22nd Infantry Regiment
- Battle of Mogadishu: Operation Just Cause; Operation Gothic Serpent; Operation Joint Guardian; War in Afghanistan; Iraq War
- Awards: Legion of Merit; Bronze Star Medal; Purple Heart; Meritorious Service Medal
- Other work: Veteran advocacy and public speaking

Michael Dane Steele (born September 15, 1960) is a retired colonel of the United States Army. He was a company commander in the 3rd Battalion, 75th Ranger Regiment in the Battle of Mogadishu (1993) in Somalia during Operation Gothic Serpent, which was the subject of the book and film Black Hawk Down. Growing up in northern Georgia, he was a star athlete in his high school football team and attended the University of Georgia in Athens, where he was commissioned from the Army Reserve Officer's Training Corps (ROTC) as an Infantry officer before being promoted to captain and moving to the 75th Ranger Regiment as the commander of Bravo Company, 3rd Battalion.

The Rangers, led by their battalion commander Lt. Colonel Danny McKnight and his staff, including Steele, gained international recognition for their actions in Mogadishu while fighting alongside Delta Force and other elements of Army Special Operations Command, which resulted in Steele being awarded the Bronze Star for valor in combat and leadership of his company during the engagement. After the battle, he eventually moved to the 101st Airborne Division in the 2000s and served as a staff officer. Following the events of September 11th, 2001, and the beginning of the Global War on Terrorism he led air assault troops into action in Operation Enduring Freedom and Iraqi Freedom before retiring in 2010 with the rank of full colonel.

He briefly appears in the documentary I Am an American Soldier. Steele was investigated in conjunction with the murders of three unarmed Iraqis during Operation Iron Triangle. The four soldiers charged in the case testified that Steele had instructed them to "kill all military-age males". Steele denied giving such an order, and was formally reprimanded but not charged.

== Background ==
Steele is from the small Southeastern town of Statham, Georgia, and was born on September 15, 1960. He attended the University of Georgia, where he was an offensive lineman for the Bulldogs football team, during the Vince Dooley era. In 1980, the Bulldogs were crowned national champions. Upon graduation, Steele was commissioned as an infantry officer through Army ROTC in 1983. His first assignment was to the Berlin Brigade in West Berlin. Later he received a master's degree from Central Michigan University. His military education includes the following: Airborne School, Ranger School, Joint Power Control School, Army Command and General Staff College.

== Operation Gothic Serpent ==
In August 1993, Captain Steele deployed to Mogadishu, Somalia, commanding a rifle company in the 75th Ranger Regiment as part of Task Force Ranger, a force made up of various special operations forces units tasked with capturing the Somali warlord Mohamed Farrah Aidid.

On the afternoon of 3 October 1993, Task Force Ranger received intelligence that two leaders of Aidid's militia were at a residence in central Mogadishu. In response, the task force sent 19 aircraft, 12 vehicles, and 160 men to arrest them. At 1542 hours, in Mogadishu, Steele fast-roped from a UH-60 Black Hawk helicopter into the Bakara Market. The raid was to take 30 minutes and was meant to capture Omar Salad and Abdi Hassan Awale, two top advisors to Aidid. They and other prisoners were loaded into the vehicle convoy to be transported back to base. However, with the downing of two MH-60 Black Hawks, Super 61 (CW4 Cliff Wolcott) and Super 64 (CW3 Mike Durant), the mission dramatically changed for the worse.

The Delta operators and Rangers, under Steele's command, provided security around the crash site of Super 61 and fought off thousands of armed insurgents through the night. After 15½ hours of intense fighting, a convoy of armored vehicles arrived to extract them. The Rangers then provided security around the convoy and fought their way out to the safety of the United Nations forces base at the Pakistani Stadium, north of the Bakara Market. The outcome of the raid was 16 Rangers, Delta Force, and 160th SOAR personnel KIA and 89 WIA. In addition, two American soldiers from the 10th Mountain Division and one Malaysian soldier were killed in the extraction convoy. One more Delta operator was killed several days later when a mortar round struck the compound of Task Force Ranger. Durant was held captive for eleven days. Anywhere from 700–1,500 Somali militia were killed during the battle. Steele was awarded the Bronze Star with Valor Device for his actions as a commander during the fight.

== Operation Iraqi Freedom ==
Steele commanded the 3rd Brigade (Rakkasan) of the 101st Airborne Division from June 2004 through November 2006. During his command, he oversaw the transformation of the unit from a traditional three battalion infantry brigade into a six battalion infantry brigade combat team composed of two infantry battalions, a reconnaissance squadron, a field artillery battalion, support battalion, and special troops battalion. Steele and his brigade deployed to Iraq the fall of 2005 and conducted operations primarily in Saladin Governorate. In March 2006, the brigade planned and executed Operation Swarmer, which was a joint U.S-Iraqi air assault operation targeting insurgents in the desert area to the northeast province of Samarra.

According to the US military, it was the largest air assault in Iraq since the start of Iraq War in 2003. In addition to Operation Swarmer, the brigade conducted numerous other brigade and battalion sized operations including Operation Katrina, Operation Rita, Operation(s) Red Light I, II and III, Operation Swift Sword, Operation Starlight, and Operation Iron Triangle. In November 2006, Steele successfully completed his command with the 3rd Brigade of the 101st Airborne Division and was assigned as the Deputy G3, Training, United States Army Forces Command (FORSCOM) at Fort McPherson, Georgia, where he coordinated the training for CONUS based Army forces.

== Iron Triangle murders ==
For killings of unarmed combatants during Operation Iron Triangle (2006), four soldiers were taken to an Article 32 hearing, where they testified that Steele had told them to "kill all military-age males." Steele refused to testify at the hearing for the accused soldiers, which is considered unusual for a commanding officer. He was investigated in connection with the incident and stated that he did not use "specific language" to order his soldiers to kill all military-age males, and that "we don't shoot people with their hands up." He was not charged, but was later formally reprimanded by (then) Lieutenant General Peter W. Chiarelli, commander of the Multi-National Corps – Iraq. The reprimand effectively ended Steele's future chances of promotion in the army.

The content of the reprimand has not been made public, but two anonymous defense department officials identified by The New York Times have said that the reprimand was "for not reporting the deaths and other details of the raid." Steele also instigated the use of "Kill Boards" to track how many Iraqis each company in his battalion had killed, while one of Steele's battalion commanders, Lieutenant Colonel Nathaniel Johnson, Jr. has written that "Colonel Steele constantly articulated his judgment and displeasure that my battalion was not being aggressive enough toward the insurgents."

== See also ==
- Military-age male
