= William Garrison =

William Garrison is the name of:

- William Lloyd Garrison (1805–1879), abolitionist
- William Garrison (geographer) (1924–2015), geographer and professor
- William F. Garrison, US general
