= Thomas Matthews (colonel) =

American army officer (born 1949)

Thomas E. Matthews
- Born: 1949 (age 76–77); Philadelphia, Pennsylvania
- Alma mater: United States Military Academy
- Spouse: Jessica Ruggieri (m. 1974)
- Military career
- Allegiance: United States of America
- Branch: United States Army
- Service years: 1972–2002
- Rank: Colonel
- Commands: 1st Bn, 160th SOAR
- Conflicts: Battle of Mogadishu (1993)
- Awards: Distinguished Flying Cross; Air Medal

Thomas E. Matthews (born 1949) is a retired United States Army colonel who is best known for his commanding role in the Battle of Mogadishu in 1993.

During the Battle of Mogadishu, Matthews and a Delta Force officer, Lt. Col. Gary Harrell commanded from the helicopter Super 6-3 (piloted by Chief Warrant Officer 4 Stu Kaufman and Chief Warrant Officer 3 Mark Bergamo) circling over the battle. Matthews was the commander of 1st Battalion, 160th Special Operations Aviation Regiment (Airborne), of which 5 members of his unit were killed when two Black Hawk Helicopters were shot down by the forces of Somali warlord Mohamed Farrah Aidid.

Matthews was awarded the Distinguished Flying Cross and the Air Medal by President Bill Clinton for his actions in Somalia. Matthews was an adviser for the movie Black Hawk Down about the Battle of Mogadishu and was portrayed in the movie by Glenn Morshower. Matthews later retired from military service and works in the Office of the Joint Chiefs of Staff at the Department of Defense. He currently resides in northern Virginia with his family.
