= Danny McKnight =

American military officer

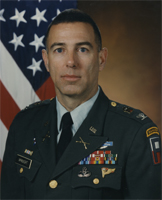
- Born: April 9, 1951 (age 75); Columbus, Georgia, U.S.
- Relatives: Linda McKnight (spouse)
- Military career
- Allegiance: United States of America
- Branch: United States Army
- Service years: 1973–2002
- Rank: Colonel
- Commands: 3rd Ranger Battalion; 75th Ranger Regiment; 4th Battalion, 27th Infantry Regiment; First United States Army
- Awards: Legion of Merit (2); Bronze Star Medal with Valor; Purple Heart
- Other work: Motivational speaker

Danny R. McKnight (born April 9, 1951) is an American retired colonel who served in the United States Army. He is best known for his role as commander of the 3rd Battalion, 75th Ranger Regiment in the Battle of Mogadishu. His participation in the battle was also heavily portrayed in the film Black Hawk Down, where his role was played by Tom Sizemore.

== Early life ==
Danny R. McKnight was born in Columbus, Georgia, on April 9, 1951. His family later moved to Rockledge, Florida, in 1959. McKnight graduated from Cocoa High School in 1969 and Brevard Community College (now Eastern Florida State College) in 1971.

== Early military career ==
It was during his undergraduate studies that McKnight's military career began to take shape. He was recognized as a distinguished military graduate by Florida State University in 1973, shortly after earning his bachelor's degree in management. He eventually went on to complete the Basic Officer Leaders Course and graduated from the United States Army Airborne School and Ranger School. In 1985, he earned his master's degree in higher education from the University of Florida while being simultaneously assigned as an assistant professor of military science in the university's Army Reserve Officers' Training Corps department.

== Overseas deployments ==
In 1989, McKnight was deployed to Panama as part of the United States invasion of Panama.

McKnight was deployed again in 1993 to Mogadishu, Somalia. During this time, he served as commander of the 3rd Battalion, 75th Ranger Regiment as part of a special operations detachment tasked with peacekeeping operations on behalf of the United Nations security forces. It had already been the second United Nations intervention in the Somali Civil War at the time of McKnight's deployment.

Situations in Mogadishu eventually devolved and escalated, resulting in the Battle of Mogadishu. McKnight participated in the battle by commanding the 450 soldiers of the 75th Ranger Regiment and leading the coalition convoy through the city. He sustained injuries in the neck and arm during the battle.

== Awards and decorations ==
COL McKnight's awards include:

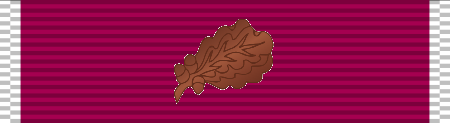

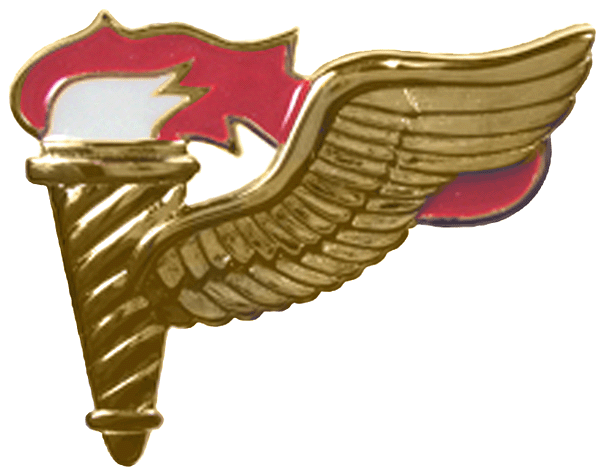

Combat Infantryman Badge with Star (denoting 2nd award)
Legion of Merit with 1 Oak leaf cluster		Bronze Star with "V" device
Purple Heart	Meritorious Service Medal	Army Commendation Medal
Army Achievement Medal	National Defense Service Medal with 1 Service star	Armed Forces Expeditionary Medal with Arrowhead device
Humanitarian Service Medal	Army Service Ribbon	Army Overseas Service Ribbon
Master Parachutist Badge with 1 combat star		Pathfinder Badge
3rd Ranger Battalion Combat Service Identification Badge	75th Ranger Regiment Distinctive unit insignia	Ranger tab

Expert Infantryman Badge

== See also ==
- Operation Just Cause
- Battle of Mogadishu
- William F. Garrison
- Jeff Struecker
- Michael D. Steele
- Black Hawk Down
