= Battle of Mogadishu (1993) =

Military conflict during the Somali Civil War

- Part of Operation Gothic Serpent, UNOSOM II, and the Somali Civil War
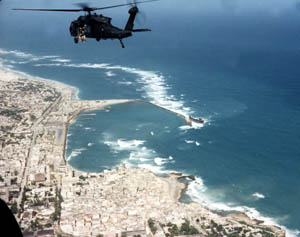
- Super Six-Four, one of the Black Hawks shot down, above Mogadishu
Date	3–4 October 1993 (1 day)
Location	Mogadishu, Somalia 2°03′09″N 45°19′29″E
Result	Somali National Alliance victory (see Aftermath): Somali National Alliance successfully force the Task Force Rangers and UNOSOM II to withdraw; SNA captures TFR pilot; released by mid-October 1993; TFR successfully capture SNA personnel; released by January 1994

Belligerents
United Nations; United States; Malaysia; Pakistan	Somali National Alliance; Al-Itihaad al-Islamiya

Commanders and leaders
(United States) William F. Garrison; (United States) Danny R. McKnight (WIA); (United States) William Boykin; (United States) Gary L. Harrell; (United States) Thomas E. Matthews; (Malaysia) Abdul Latif Ahmad	(Somalia) Mohamed Farrah Aidid (Somalia) Sharif Hassan Giumale (Somalia) Omar Salad Elmi (POW) (Somalia) Abdi Hassan Awale (POW); Abdullahi Ahmed Sahal

Strength
160 initial forces; 3,000 rescue forces; 16 helicopters; 4 M48 tanks; 30+ Condor/M113 APCs; 9 HMMWVs; 3 M939 5-ton 6x6 trucks	1,500 SNA fighters; supported by volunteer insurgents (Note: Estimated 1,500 SNA deployed in Mogadishu.)

Casualties and losses
(United States) 18 killed, 84 wounded; (Malaysia) 1 killed, 7 wounded; (Pakistan) 2 wounded	200 killed, 700 wounded (per Red Cross and Doctors Without Borders); 315 killed (including 133 SNA fighters), 812 wounded (per SNA); 300–700 killed (other estimates)

The Battle of Mogadishu (Somali: Maalintii Rangers, lit. 'Day of the Rangers'), also known as the Black Hawk Down Incident, was part of Operation Gothic Serpent. It was fought on 3–4 October 1993, in Mogadishu, Somalia, between forces of the United States—supported by UNOSOM II—against Somali National Alliance (SNA) fighters and other insurgents in south Mogadishu.

The battle took place during the UNOSOM II phase of the United Nations (UN) intervention in the Somali Civil War. The UN had initially dispatched forces to alleviate the 1992 famine, but then shifted to attempting to restore a central government and establishing a democracy. During June 1993, UNOSOM suffered significant losses when the Pakistani troops were attacked while inspecting a SNA radio station and weapons-storage site. The UN blamed SNA leader General Mohammed Farah Aidid and began military operations against him. In July 1993, US forces conducted the Bloody Monday raid, killing many elders and prominent members of Aidid's clan, the Habr Gidr. That raid, combined with other incidents involving significant civilian casualties, fueled support for the insurgency against UNOSOM and led to the first deliberate attacks on American forces. This, in turn, led US president Bill Clinton to initiate Operation Gothic Serpent in order to capture Aidid.

On 3 October 1993, US forces planned to seize two of Aidid's top lieutenants during a meeting deep in the city. The raid was only intended to last an hour but morphed into an overnight standoff and rescue operation extending into the daylight hours of the next day. While the goal of the operation was achieved, it was a pyrrhic victory and spiraled into the deadly Battle of Mogadishu. As the operation was ongoing, Somali insurgents shot down three American Black Hawk helicopters using RPG-7s, with two crashing deep in hostile territory, resulting in the capture of an American pilot. A desperate defense of the two downed helicopters began and fighting lasted through the night to defend the survivors of the crashes. Through the night and into the next morning, a large UNOSOM II armored convoy consisting of Pakistani, Malaysian and American troops pushed through the city to relieve the besieged troops and withdrew incurring further casualties but rescuing the survivors.

No battle since the Vietnam War had killed so many US troops. Casualties included 18 dead American soldiers and 73 wounded, with Malaysian forces suffering one death and seven wounded, and Pakistani forces two injuries. Somali casualties, a mixture of insurgents and civilians, were far higher; most estimates are between 133 and 700 dead.

After the battle, dead US troops were dragged through the streets by enraged Somalis, an act that was broadcast on American television to public outcry. The battle led to the end of Operation Gothic Serpent and UNOSOM II military operations, which the insurgency saw as victory. By early 1995, all UN forces withdrew from Somalia. Fears of committing large numbers of US troops to Somalia in the years following the battle led to the CIA using warlords as proxies against the Somali Islamic Courts in the 2000s. This aversion to large-scale military intervention in the country, and Africa more broadly, is commonly referred to as the "Somalia Syndrome".

== Background ==
Throughout the 1980s, the Somali Rebellion escalated, eventually culminating in the full outbreak of the Somali Civil War and the collapse of the regime of President Siad Barre at the start of 1991. Food shortages began in mid-1990, the final year of Siad Barre's rule. By early 1991, the formal economy collapsed as rebel groups toppled the Somali Democratic Republic. A severe drought hit southern Somalia in 1991–1992, as the civil war disrupted traditional coping mechanisms and law enforcement disintegrated. These factors resulted in the 1992 famine, the primary cause of which was the devastation of infrastructure and farmland in the inter-riverine regions amid armed conflict.

The main rebel faction that had toppled the regime was the United Somali Congress (USC), which divided into two armed factions: one led by Ali Mahdi Muhammad, who later became president; and the other by General Mohamed Farrah Aidid, which became known as the Somali National Alliance (SNA). After losing control of Mogadishu, remnants of former President Barres forces created the Somali National Front (SNF) and withdrew south into the nation's breadbasket. Serious damage was inflicted in Somalia's agricultural regions during fighting between the SNF and Aidid's forces, before the latter drove the SNF far into the south of the country.

=== UNOSOM and UNITAF ===
In early 1992, as relief agencies initiated operations to respond to the humanitarian crisis, they encountered growing obstacles in delivering aid to the impacted affected inter-riverine region. The disintegration of local law enforcement paved the way for armed looters and criminals to steal food from storage sites and supply routes. Many thieves at Mogadishu's sea and airport, the main supply hub, were linked to the rebel forces of Ali Mahdi and Mohamed Farah Aidid but were effectively demobilized following the rout of the SNF. With militia leaders lacking funds and Barre's forces no longer presenting a unifying threat, Aidid and Mahdi increasingly lost control over many young fighters, as did clan elders. As a result, many resorted to food theft for survival and income. In response to this deteriorating security situation, UNOSOM I was established in April 1992 under the leadership of Mohamed Sahnoun to help facilitate the delivery of humanitarian aid. In May 1992 the first UN aid shipment arrived in Mogadishu.

During August 1992, US President George H. W. Bush launched Operation Provide Relief, deploying US military transport aircraft to support the UN relief effort in Somalia. That same month, UNOSOM I head Mohamed Sahnoun secured Somali National Alliance approval for 500 peacekeepers, with further deployments requiring the groups consent. However, UN Secretary-General Boutros Boutros-Ghali unilaterally announced an expansion to 3,500 troops days later, undermining the local support Sahnoun had built. Overruled by UN headquarters, he failed to delay the deployment. The large-scale intervention in late 1992 fueled nationalist opposition, bolstering Aidid's SNA, which denounced the UN's perceived colonial approach.

By November 1992, largely owing to the mediation efforts of Mohamed Sahnoun, aid was flowing through the Mogadishu port unimpeded, with theft and banditry on the routes to famine zones averaging around 20%. That same month, Sahnoun was replaced by Ismat T. Kittani, who took a confrontational approach, deploying UNOSOM troops into politically sensitive areas and triggering a security crisis with local factions. Kittani claimed 80% of aid shipments were looted, a figure later echoed by the UN Secretariat and the US State Department to justify expanding intervention, though many top UN officials and aid workers disputed the figure. In the view of some top UNOSOM I commanders, the scope of the famine was being exaggerated in order to justify using Somalia as an experiment, as the UN Secretariat believed Somalia represented an ideal candidate for a test case of a UN operation of expanded size and mandate.

On 9 December 1992, American troops began landing on the Somali coastline at Mogadishu under UNITAF (Operation Restore Hope). A total 17,800 US Marines and 10,000 US Army infantry were deployed. The famine in Somalia was already concluding as the troops began landing. The United States had various motives for military involvement in Somalia. The US armed forces wanted to prove its capability to conduct major 'Operations Other Than War', while the US State Department wanted to set a precedent for humanitarian military intervention in the post-Cold War era. The United Nations' intervention, backed by US Marines, has been credited with helping end the famine in Somalia, though the starvation had been improving in the worst-affected areas before troops arrived and had the effect of speeding the conclusion of the crisis by about a month. In 1994, the Washington-based Refugee Policy Group NGO estimated that of the approximately 100,000 lives that were saved as a result of international assistance, 10,000 had been after the deployment of US troops.

=== Mission shift and increasing tensions ===
On 3 March 1993, United Nations Secretary-General Boutros Boutros-Ghali submitted to the UN Security Council his recommendations for shifting from UNITAF to UNOSOM II. He said that since Resolution 794's adoption in December 1992, UNITAF had deployed 37,000 personnel over forty percent of southern and central Somalia. He said the force's presence and operations had improved Somalia's security situation and the delivery of humanitarian assistance. There was still no effective government, police, or national army, resulting in serious security threats to U.N. personnel. To that end, the Security Council authorized UNOSOM II to establish a secure environment throughout Somalia, to achieve national reconciliation so as to create a democratic state.

At the Conference on National Reconciliation in Somalia, held on 15 March 1993, in Addis Ababa, Ethiopia, all 15 Somali parties agreed to the terms set out to restore peace. Major disagreements between the UN and the Somali National Alliance began soon after the establishment of UNOSOM II, centering on the perceived true nature of the operations political mandate. In May 1993, relations between the SNA and UNOSOM rapidly deteriorated, resulting in the SNA engaging in "anti-UNOSOM propaganda" broadcasts from Radio Mogadishu.

=== UNOSOM offensive and Mogadishu insurgency ===
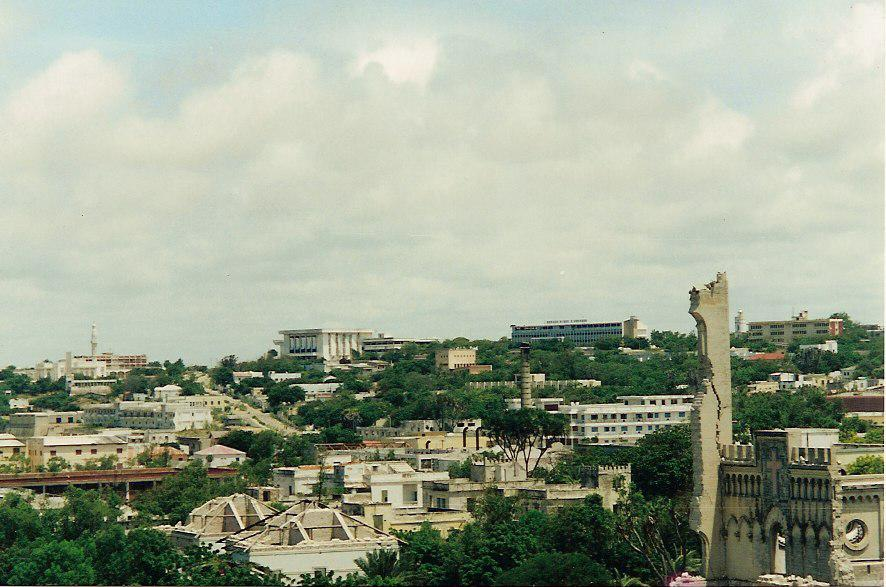
The Mogadishu skyline from a UNOSOM convoy

On 5 June 1993, SNA fighters and Somali citizens at Radio Mogadishu attacked the Pakistani force that was inspecting an arms cache located at the station, out of fear that the United Nations forces had been sent to shut down the SNA's broadcast infrastructure. Radio was the most popular medium for news in Somalia, and consequently control of the airwaves was considered vital to both the SNA and UNOSOM. Radio Mogadishu was a highly popular station with the residents of Mogadishu, and rumors that the United Nations was planning to seize or destroy it had been abound for days before 5 June. On 31 May 1993, Aidid's political rivals met with the top UNOSOM official and attempted to convince him to take over Radio Mogadishu, a meeting Aidid was made well aware of. According to the 1994 United Nations Inquiry in the events leading up to the Battle of Mogadishu:

Opinions differ, even among UNOSOM officials, on whether the weapons inspections of 5 June 1993 was genuine or was merely a cover-up for reconnaissance and subsequent seizure of Radio Mogadishu.

The attack marked a seminal moment in the UNOSOM II operation. The Pakistani forces suffered 24 dead and 57 wounded, as well as one wounded Italian and three wounded US soldiers. On 6 June 1993, the Security Council passed Resolution 837, a call for the arrest and prosecution of the persons responsible. Though Resolution 837 did not name Aidid, it held the Somali National Alliance responsible. The hunt for Aidid became a major focus of the U.N. intervention through the Battle of Mogadishu. Admiral Jonathan Howe issued a $25,000 warrant for information leading to Aidid's arrest, while UNOSOM forces began attacking targets all over Mogadishu in hopes of finding him. Professor Ioan M. Lewis asserts that the UN made an unwise choice to resort to military force, which led to substantial Somali casualties, rather than attempting to politically isolate Aidid and launch an independent legal inquiry.

In mid-June 1993, American AC-130 gunships began striking SNA targets across the capital and an insurgency began growing against UNOSOM forces. When Somali insurgents and UNOSOM forces skirmished, it proved to be costly to each—especially for the Somali, who were usually outgunned by heavy weaponry. Through the rest of June the insurgency escalated, resulting in growing losses on both sides, in one instance a crowd of protestors were machine gunned by UNOSOM troops resulting in the death of at least 20 civilians.

A week after the start of the offensive, US intelligence claimed Aidid's command was badly weakened, SNA morale had collapsed, and most of its arsenal was destroyed. Officials estimated only 300 fighters loyal to Aidid opposed UNOSOM, driven by cash or the drug khat. Instead each major armed confrontation with UN forces was noted to have the effect of inadvertently increasing Aidid's stature with the Somali public.

The UNOSOM offensive backfired politically, alienating many Somalis, boosting support for Aidid, and drawing international criticism. In response, many UNOSOM II contingents pushed for diplomacy with the SNA, while relief agencies began distancing themselves from the UN. Former Under-Secretary-General of the UN, Ramesh Thakur, observed that, "The scale, intensity, and frequency of the use of force by UNOSOM after June 1993 bore little resemblance to the rhetoric and expectations of when it was established, nor any recognizable relationship by then to a peacekeeping operation as defined in the UN lexicon."

=== Bloody Monday raid ===
On 12 July 1993, a house where a meeting of clan elders was taking place was attacked by US AH-1 Cobra helicopters in what became known to the Somalis as Bloody Monday. UNOSOM claimed that they had launched a successful raid on a Somali National Alliance command and control center where hardliners had been gathered, an account that is widely disputed by Somalis, foreign journalists and human rights organizations. UNOSOM II head Johnathan Howe alleged that evidence to back UN claims could not be provided because the cameras recording the raid had jammed. The footage recorded of the incident by a Somali cameraman was considered so disturbing that CNN deemed it too graphic to show on air to the American public. Human Rights Watch observed that UNOSOM had produced no evidence to substantiate its claims about the raid. According to Dr. Sebastian Kaempf, the Abdi House raid represented the single most important event during UNOSOM II, as the consequences of the attack proved disastrous for UNOSOM interests in Somalia. Notable groups and organizations such as the Vatican, the Organisation of African Unity, World Vision, Doctors Without Borders, Human Rights Watch and Amnesty International called for UNOSOM to review it policies and course.

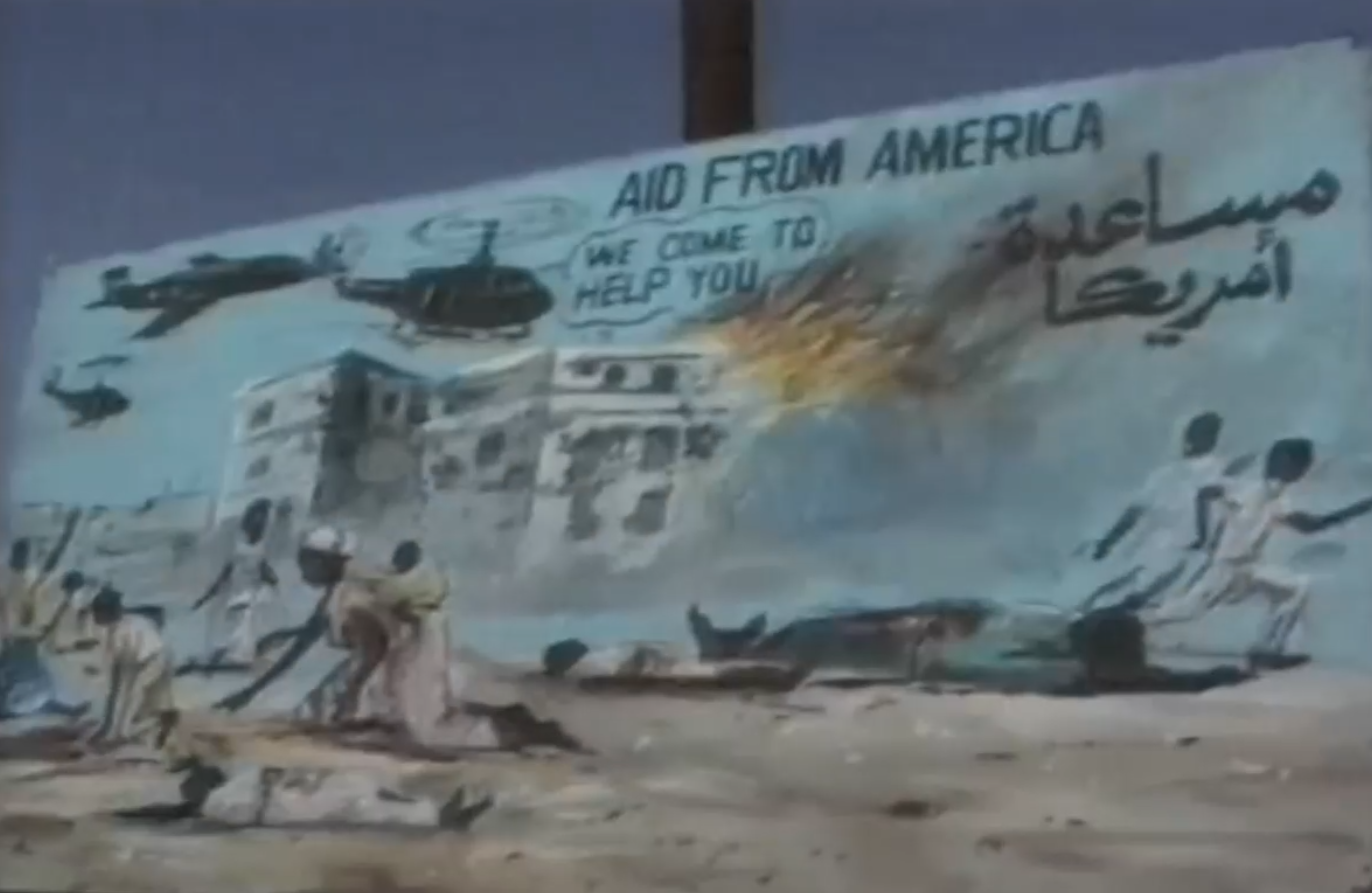
A sign at an anti-UNOSOM protest in Mogadishu depicting Bloody Monday

According to the Red Cross, there were 215 Somalis casualties, although in the aftermath of the attack they were able to survey the dead and injured at only two of the hospitals in Mogadishu. Human Rights Watch declared that the attack "looked like mass murder" and an American reporter who was present on the scene said that the raid was far deadlier than US and UN officials acknowledged. An SNA official reported 73 were killed including many prominent clan elders, a charge UNOSOM denied. Bowden noted that every eyewitness he interviewed placed the number of dead at 70 or more and that former ambassador and US special envoy to Somalia Robert B. Oakley accepted this figure. He further noted that many of those interviewed, including non-Somali aid workers, would say that many of those killed in the attack had been well-respected moderates opposed to Aidid. Regardless of the meeting's true intent, the attack is generally considered as the most significant of the many incidents that occurred in 1993 that caused many Somalis to turn against UNOSOM II, especially the US contingent.

The raid exposed deep rifts and created dissension amongst the UNOSOM II coalition, which consequently began fraying the cohesion and unity of the operation. The head of the UNOSOM II Justice Division would criticize the raid in a memo to the head of UNOSOM. Further criticism of the raid came from numerous contributing states, most notably the Italian contingent, who threatened to pull out of the whole operation citing concerns that the escalation was indicative that relief role of UNOSOM II had been overtaken by an American-led war. Italy, which had ruled Somalia as a colonial territory for half a century, believed that the unprecedented attack threatened to widen the civil war and turn the Somalis against UNOSOM. Intense diplomatic efforts were made in order to avert a major split in UNOSOM II. Several UNOSOM contingents ceased their participation in operations against Aidid upon receiving orders from their governments, weakening the already fragile command authority. Additionally, many humanitarian efforts came to a halt, and numerous NGOs expressed their disapproval of UNOSOM. The strike caused an outcry among UN civilian staffers and disenchantment over the direction of UNOSOM II for employees of the humanitarian section. Several UN officials resigned in protest, including the top UNOSOM II Justice Division official, Ann Wright. Many of those who stayed would comment to reporters that the UN had relinquished its moral authority in its war against Aidid. The dissension in the UN ranks with the Italians and others over what had occurred on 12 July 1993 led to a significant lull in UNOSOM operations in Mogadishu until the 8 August 1993 killings of American soldiers.

A significant increase in attacks on UNOSOM II troops followed 12 July 1993, and American forces in Mogadishu began being deliberately targeted by Somali factions. Night patrols were halted entirely due to Mogadishu becoming too dangerous for foreign troops. In the view of Robert B. Oakley, "Before July 12th, the US would have been attacked only because of association with the UN, but the US was never singled out until after July 12th". Black Hawk Down author Mark Bowden argued that the raid marked a serious escalation of the conflict in Somalia and was "a monumental misjudgment" and "tragic mistake". The events of Bloody Monday led Aidid to make the decision to specifically target American soldiers for the first time and resulted in the 8 August killings of US troops that pushed President Clinton to send in extra troops to capture him.

=== The August killings and the deployment of Task Force Ranger ===
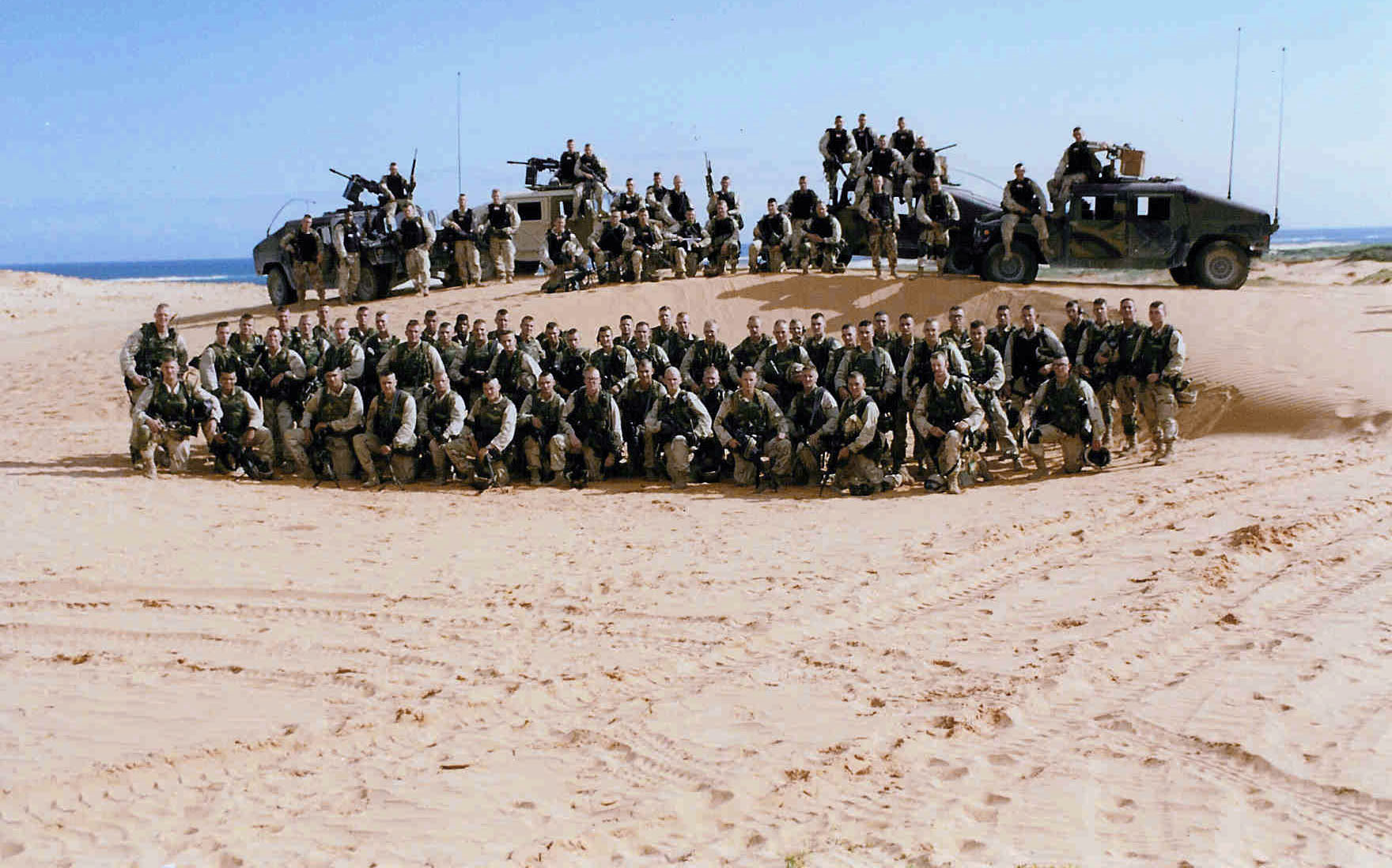
Bravo Company, 3rd Battalion of the 75th Ranger Regiment in Somalia, 1993

In the three weeks following the events of Bloody Monday there was a large lull in UNOSOM operations in Mogadishu, as the city had become incredibly hostile to foreign troops. Then on 8 August, in an area of the city that had been considered "relatively safe to travel in", the SNA detonated a bomb against a US military Humvee, killing four soldiers. A total of three American soldiers had died in the intervention, marking the 8 August incident as the largest single killing of US troops in Somalia so far.

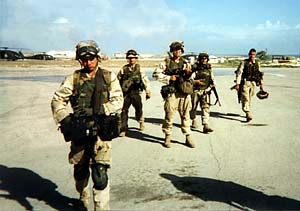
Chalk Four Ranger returns to base after a mission in Somalia, 1993.

Two weeks later another bomb injured seven more. In response, US President Bill Clinton approved the proposal to deploy a task force composed of elite special forces units, including 400 US Army Rangers and Delta Force operators.

On 22 August 1993, the unit deployed to Somalia under the command of Major General William F. Garrison, commander of the special multi-disciplinary Joint Special Operations Command (JSOC) at the time.

The force consisted of:

- B Company, 3rd Battalion, 75th Ranger Regiment under the command of Captain Michael D. Steele;
- C Squadron, 1st Special Forces Operational Detachment-Delta (1st SFOD-D) under the command of Lt Col Gary L. Harrell;
- A deployment package of 16 helicopters and personnel from the 1st Battalion, 160th Special Operations Aviation Regiment (160th SOAR), which included MH-60 Black Hawks and AH/MH-6 Little Birds under the command of Col Thomas Matthews;
- Navy SEALs from the Naval Special Warfare Development Group (DEVGRU);
- Air Force Pararescuemen and Combat Controllers from the 24th Special Tactics Squadron.

=== Escalation of insurgency and September Black Hawk shootdown ===
As American casualties started to mount in Somalia, domestic backlash in the United States grew. Bipartisan support from the US senate began to build for a withdrawal. By August 1993, it was evident to the Clinton administration that a strategy shift was necessary to retain domestic support for US involvement in Somalia. This shift was signaled by Defense Secretary Les Aspin in his 27 August speech, advocating for a decreased military focus in UNOSOM II and urging the UN and the OAU to resume negotiations with all parties.

Both the US Secretary of State and the National Security Advisor pushed for a shift towards diplomacy. Certain US officials advocated for a more aggressive response, among them was Ambassador Robert R. Gosende from the State Department. Gosende had written a cable recommending the deployment of thousands of additional troops and urged the abandonment of all diplomatic engagements with the SNA. Contrarily, General Joseph P. Hoar, who was at the helm of CENTCOM, expressed sharp disagreement with Gosende's approach. In a confidential memo, General Hoar articulated his belief that if more American troops were needed, then control of Mogadishu was already lost.

In September, tensions escalated after incidents where UNOSOM troops fired on civilian demonstrators. That month, Somali insurgents used RPGs to attack US Army Black Hawk helicopters, damaging at least one that managed to return to base. Then, at 2 a.m. on 25 September—a week before the Battle of Mogadishu—the SNA used an RPG to shoot down a Black Hawk (callsign Courage 53) while it was on patrol. The pilots were able to fly their burning aircraft away from Aidid's turf to the more UNOSOM-friendly port of Mogadishu and make a crash landing. The pilot and co-pilot survived, but three crew members were killed. A shootout ensued as peacekeepers fought for the helicopter. The event was a propaganda victory for the SNA. The chief UNOSOM II spokesman in Mogadishu, US Army Maj. David Stockwell, referred to the downing as "a very lucky shot."

== Order of battle ==
=== US and UNOSOM ===
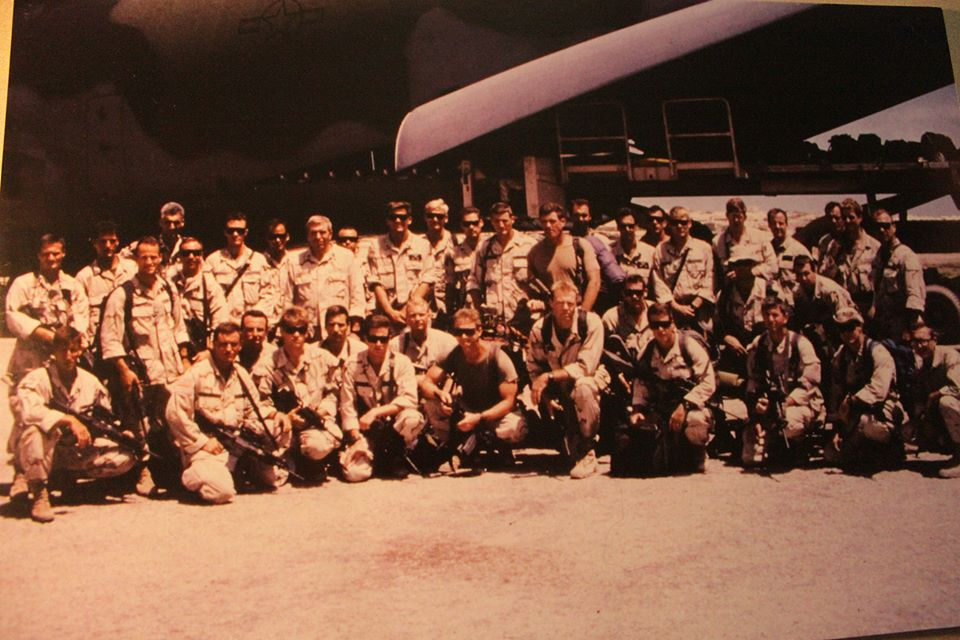
Delta C Squadron, Mogadishu, Somalia, September 1993

Units involved in the battle:

- Task Force Ranger, including:
  - C Squadron, 1st Special Forces Operational Detachment-Delta (1st SFOD-D) – also known as Delta Force
  - Bravo Company, 3rd Ranger Battalion, 75th Ranger Regiment
  - 1st Battalion, 160th Special Operations Aviation Regiment (Airborne) (The Night Stalkers) with MH-6J and AH-6 "Little Birds" and MH-60 A/L Black Hawks
  - Combat Controllers and Pararescuemen from the 24th Special Tactics Squadron
  - Navy SEALs from the Naval Special Warfare Development Group (DEVGRU)
  - CVN-72 USS Abraham Lincoln & Carrier Air Wing 11
  - Amphibious Squadron 5 (USS New Orleans, USS Denver, USS Comstock, USS Cayuga)
  - BLT 1/9 Battalion Landing Team 1st Battalion/ 9th Marines/ 13th MEU (Marine Expeditionary Unit/ USS New Orleans LPH-11 ARG (Amphibious Ready Group)
- Task Force-10th Mountain Division, including:
  - 2nd Battalion, 25th Aviation Regiment
  - 1st Battalion, 22nd Infantry Regiment
  - 2nd Battalion, 14th Infantry Regiment
  - 3rd platoon, C Company, 1st Battalion, 87th Infantry Regiment
  - 41st Engineer Battalion, 10th Mountain Division
  - 15th Battalion, Frontier Force Regiment, Pakistan Army
  - 19th Lancers, Pakistan Army
  - 10th Battalion, Baloch Regiment, Pakistan Army
  - 977th Military Police Company
- United Nations Operation in Somalia II:
  - 19th Battalion, Royal Malay Regiment, Malaysian Army
  - 11th Regiment, 21st Special Service Group, Malaysian Army
  - 7th Battalion, Frontier Force Regiment, Pakistan Army

=== Somali National Alliance and Irregular forces ===
The Somali National Alliance (SNA) was formed in June 1992, following a successful defense by many factions against an offensive by Somali president Siad Barre, in his attempt to retake Mogadishu. During the UNOSOM hunt for Aidid, the SNA was composed of multiple political organizations, such as Col. Omar Gess' Somali Patriotic Movement, the Somali Democratic Movement, the combined Digil and Mirifle clans, the Habr Gedir of the United Somali Congress headed by Aidid, and the newly established Southern Somali National Movement.

The size and structure of the SNA forces involved in the battle are not known in detail. Estimates of combatants widely vary, with figures often set to over a thousand possible fighters engaging at different points over the 17 hour battle. Estimates of SNA fighters during the battle are complicated by the many volunteers who impromptu joined skirmishes with foreign troops and the organizations use of 'for hire' gunmen. Most of the fighters who participated belonged to the Somali National Alliance, drawing largely from Aidids Habar Gidir sub-clan of the Hawiye. According to Stephen Biddle, there were presumably 1,500 SNA fighters present in the entirety of Mogadishu. US intelligence had claimed prior to the battle Aidid had only 300 fighters loyal to him at most.

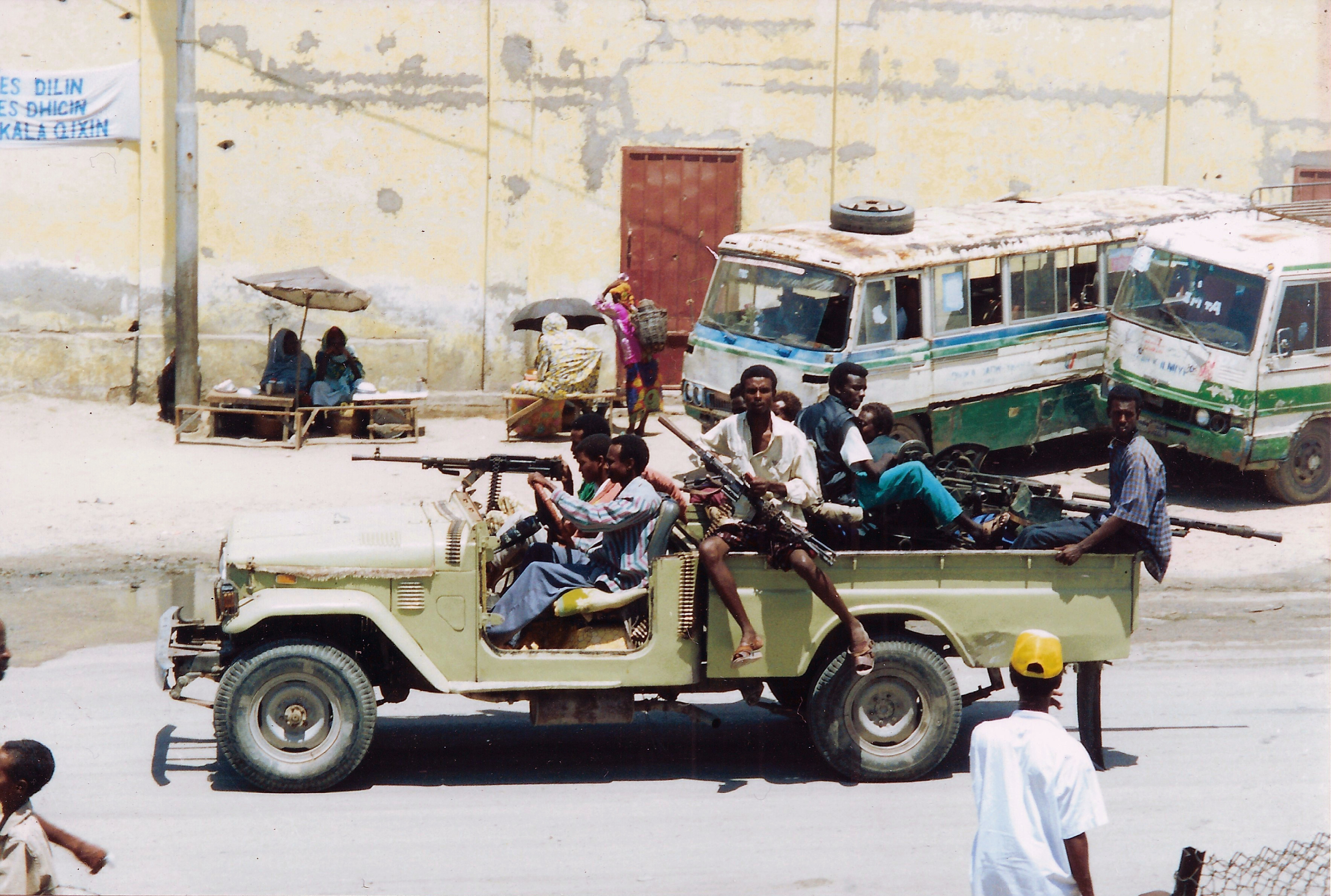
A technical in Mogadishu.

Colonel Sharif Hassan Giumale, Deputy Commander of the SNA High Commission on Defense, was the tactical commander who directly commanded Somali National Alliance fighters on the ground during the Battle of Mogadishu. Giumale, a 45-year-old former Somali army officer and brigade commander, had attended a Soviet military academy in Odessa and had later gone to Italy for further study. He had gathered combat experience in the Somali National Army during the Ogaden War with Ethiopia in the late 1970s and following the outbreak of the civil war in 1991. Many of the tactics Aidid, Giumale and other subordinate SNA commanders drew on were inspired by Chinese and Vietnamese books on guerrilla warfare and on advice from Somali mujahedeen veterans, who had just returned from the Soviet–Afghan War.

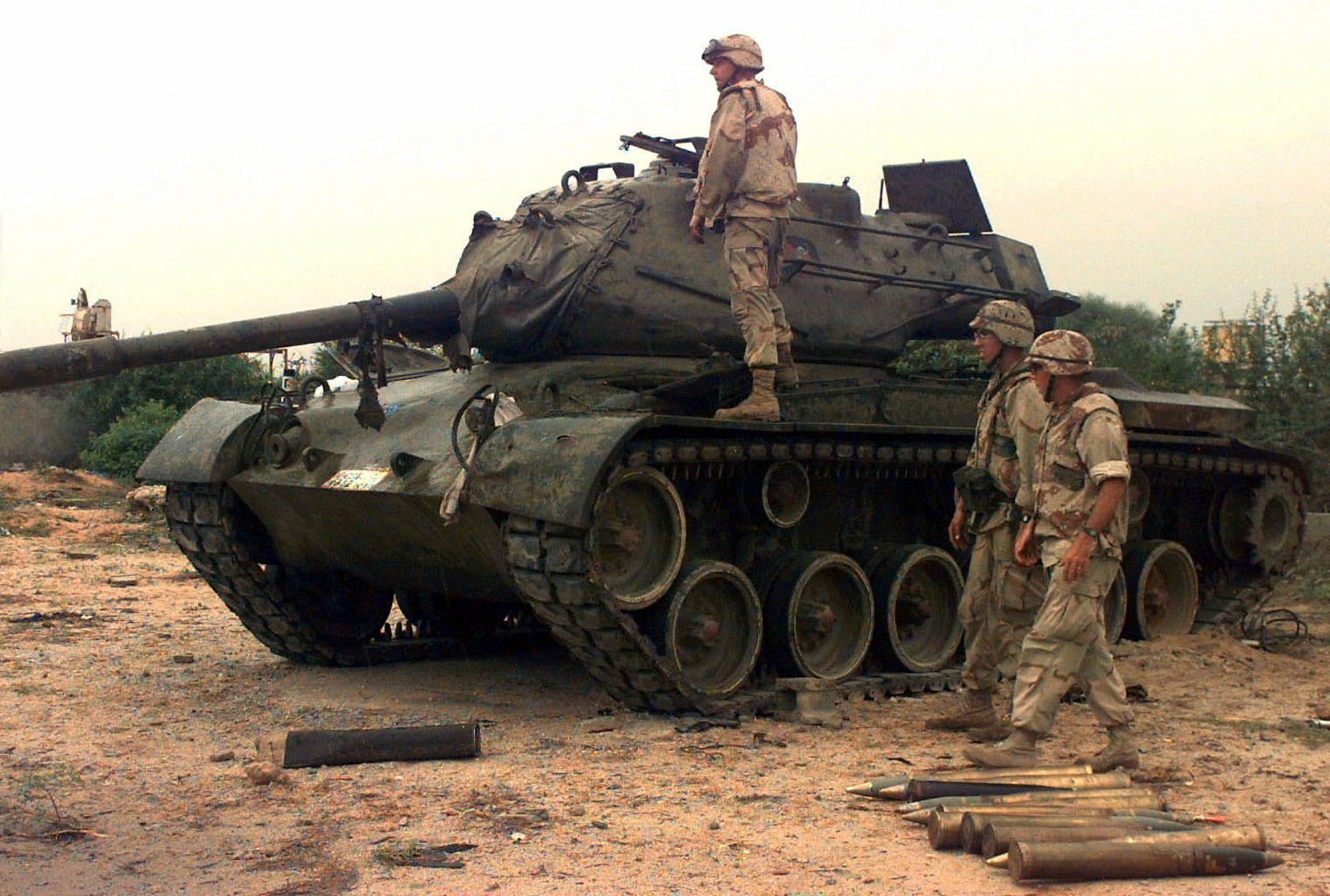
Marines examine a Somali tank, a US-made M47 Patton, that was captured in the raid of a Somali National Alliance weapons cantonment.

Despite the substantial array of heavier weaponry in SNA stockpiles, none were used during the 3–4 October battle. SNA forces were primarily equipped with light infantry weaponry, like the AK-47 assault rifle. Experienced fighters supplemented the main forces with RPG-7, grenade launchers, sniper rifles, mortars, mines, and machine guns.

==== Irregular Somali forces/volunteers ====
During the 3–4 October battle, SNA fighters fought alongside volunteer insurgents who were largely untrained civilians-turned-combatants, some of whom were women and children with grievances against UNOSOM troops. Large numbers of Somalis not affiliated with the SNA spontaneously joined the battle as it was ongoing, as small arms were widely distributed and available among the civilian population of Mogadishu. Many volunteers did not actually take part in combat, but instead operated as reconnaissance or runners for insurgents. Human rights abuses and killings by peacekeepers, US military airstrikes in heavily populated neighborhoods resulting in civilian casualties, forced evictions for UN compound expansions and the difficulty of receiving legal recourse for wrongs committed by United Nations forces all inflamed the growing animosity of the civilian population of Mogadishu. American journalist Scott Peterson reported that in the days preceding the battle, Somali anger against UNOSOM troops was stoked when American mortar crews had fired shells into the dense neighborhoods surrounding their base, killing a family of eight and injuring 34. This enraged many citizens of South Mogadishu.

The irregulars often complicated the situation on the ground for SNA commanders, as they were not controllable and often got in the way by demanding ammunition and burdening the militia's medical evacuation system. Some volunteers consisted of elderly people, women and children who utilized small arms. Many of the volunteers during the Battle of Mogadishu came from rival clans. Members of the Abgal and Habar Gidr clans, respectively loyal to Ali Mahdi and his prime rival Aidid, fought side by side against UNOSOM forces. Somali fighters from Al-Itihaad al-Islamiya also joined the battle.

== Planning ==
Mogadishu battle sites on 3–4 October 1993.

On the morning of 3 October 1993, a locally recruited intelligence asset reported to the CIA that two of Aidid's principal advisors in the SNA, Omar Salad Elmi and Abdi Hassan Awale, would be meeting near the Olympic Hotel (2°03′04.1″N 45°19′28.9″E). The asset said that Aidid and other high-ranking figures would possibly be present. The Olympic Hotel and the surrounding Bakara market was considered Habr Gidr territory and very hostile, as the clan made up a significant composition of the SNA militia. UNOSOM forces had refused to enter the area during previous engagements with the SNA.

The plan to capture the targets was relatively straightforward. First, the Somali CIA asset would drive to the site of the meeting and open the hood of his vehicle to mark the building for surveillance aircraft overhead. Delta operators would then assault and secure the building using MH-6 Little Bird helicopters. Four Ranger chalks under Captain Michael D. Steele would fast-rope from hovering MH-60L Black Hawks. The Rangers would then create a four-corner defensive perimeter around the target building to ensure that no enemy could get in or out. Fast-roping was deemed necessary for the raid as the Black Hawks had no suitable landing zone to deploy troops.

Special operations forces consisting of Bravo Company 3rd Battalion, the 75th Ranger Regiment; the 1st Special Forces Operational Detachment-Delta; and the 160th Aviation Battalion, would capture Omar Salad Elmi and Mohamed Hassan Awale. A column of 12 vehicles (nine Humvees and three M939 trucks) under the command of Lieutenant Colonel Danny McKnight would arrive at the building to take the assault team and their prisoners back to base. The entire operation was projected to take no longer than 30 minutes.

=== SNA defense strategy ===
The Somali National Alliance had divided South Mogadishu into 18 military sectors, each with its own field officer on alert at all times and a radio network linking them together. The SNA had an excellent grasp of the area around the Olympic Hotel, as it was their home turf, and had created an effective mobilization system that allowed commanders to quickly mass troops within 30 minutes into any area of South Mogadishu.

Col. Sharif Hassan Giumale had carefully analyzed Task Force Ranger's previous six operations in Mogadishu and attempted to apply lessons from the civil war and from his extensive reading on guerrilla insurgencies, particularly the FLMN in El Salvador, who had developed anti-aircraft tactics with infantry weapons. After close observation, he had hypothesized the American raids stressed speed, so the SNA had to react more quickly. It was clear that the Americans' greatest technological advantage in Mogadishu—and its Achilles' heel, the helicopter, had to be neutralized during one of the ranger raids. This would completely negate the American element of speed and surprise, which would consequently draw them into a protracted fight with his troops. An attacking force of militia would then surround the target and offset the superior American firepower with sheer numbers. Ambushes and barricades would be utilized in order to impede UNOSOM reinforcements.

Knowing US special forces considered themselves elite, Giumale believed that they were hubristically underrating the tactical capacity of SNA fighters, who had months of urban fighting experience in the streets of Mogadishu. According to Washington Post reporter Rick Atkinson, most US commanders in Mogadishu had underestimated the number of rocket-propelled grenades available to the SNA, and misjudged the threat they posed to helicopters.

== Raid ==
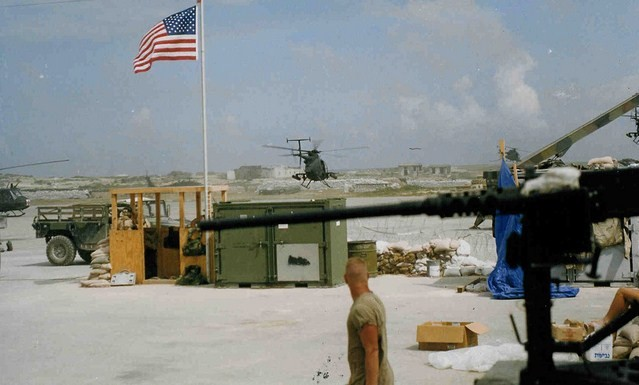
Helicopter taking off for the mission on 3 October

At 13:50, Task Force Ranger analysts received intelligence of Omar Salad's location and the command was given to begin the operation. The code word "Irene" was called across radio channels, signaling the soldiers, vehicle convoys, and helicopters staged at Mogadishu International Airport to move out. Led by the MH-6 Little Birds fully loaded with rockets, sixteen helicopters took off from the airport to make the approximately four-minute flight to the target site. In an attempt to deceive Somali forces, the formation flew past the target before turning around en masse. American aircrew noticed soon after takeoff that Somalis had started to light burning tires around the city, a tactic the SNA had previously used to signal incursions and launch counterattacks.

At 15:42, the Little Birds carrying the Delta operators reached the target. Dust surrounding the area was so bad that one helicopter was forced to land out of position. Almost immediately after the first landing, a pilot began noticing small-arms fire. Then two Black Hawks carrying the second Delta assault team led by Delta Captain Austin S. Miller came into position and dropped their teams as the four Ranger chalks prepared to rope onto the four corners surrounding the target building. Chalk Four, carried by Black Hawk Super 67, piloted by CW3 Jeff Niklaus and CW2 Sam Shamp, was accidentally put a block north of their intended point (2°03′05.5″N 45°19′27.9″E). Chalk Four declined the pilot's offer to move them back down, saying it would take too long and leave the helicopter too exposed. Once on the ground, Chalk Four intended to move down to the planned position, but intense ground fire prevented them from doing so.

According to high ranking Somali National Alliance officials, 10 minutes of general confusion followed the arrival of the Black Hawks, but after getting a basic understanding of the situation, SNA Col. Sharif Hassan Giumale gave out the order over radio to officers across Mogadishu to start converging on the site of the battle and to begin organizing ambushes along likely reinforcement routes from the UNOSOM bases. Ten minutes later, the roads surrounding the Olympic Hotel were covered with militia and nearly sealed. SNA platoons arriving from other parts of South Mogadishu splintered into a half-dozen squads of about six or seven men. After the initial call to arms, the SNA commanders ceased radio transmissions, knowing that the Americans could jam and intercept their communications, opting to instead rely on hand-written dispatches and couriers.

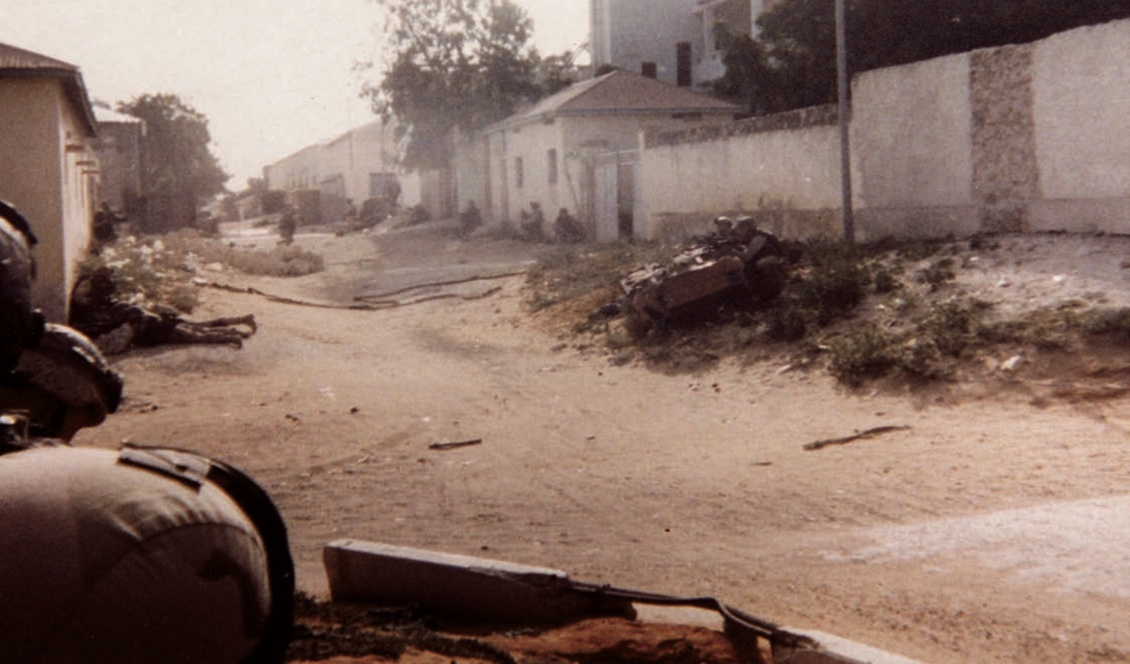
Rangers near the target building

The ground-extraction convoy was supposed to reach the captive targets a few minutes after the operation's beginning, but it was impeded by Somali citizens and local militia who formed barricades along Mogadishu's streets with rocks, wreckage, rubbish and burning tires. Some 10 minutes later, it arrived near the Olympic Hotel (02°03′01.6″N 45°19′28.6″E), down the street from the target building, where it waited for Delta and Rangers to complete their mission.

During the operation's first moments, Private First Class Todd Blackburn lost his grip while fast-roping from Super 67 as it hovered, and fell 70 feet (21 m) onto the street. Blackburn received severe injuries and required evacuation by a column of three Humvees. While taking Blackburn back to base, Sergeant Dominick Pilla, assigned to one of the Humvees being pelted with heavy fire from the surrounding buildings, was killed instantly when a bullet struck his head, becoming the first American killed in the battle.

The Humvee column arrived back at base, riddled with bullet holes and emitting smoke.

=== First Black Hawk down ===
About 40 minutes after the assault began, one of the Black Hawks, Super 61, piloted by CW3 Cliff "Elvis" Wolcott, was struck by an RPG-7 that sent the helicopter into an uncontrollable spin. The helicopter crashed in a residential area, coming to rest against a building wall in an alleyway about 300 yards east of the target building (02°03′09.4″N 45°19′34.8″E). Both pilots were killed in the resulting crash and two of the crew (Staff Sgt. Ray Dowdy and Staff Sgt. Charlie Warren) were severely wounded. Two snipers, Staff Sergeant Daniel Busch and Sergeant Jim Smith, survived the crash and began defending the crash site.

Helicopter surveillance footage and shootdown of Super 61 (no audio).

SNA militiamen in the area began calling out local residents, shouting on megaphones, "Come out and defend your homes!" The militia fighters, in organized squads, quickly began to fan in and out of nearby buildings, alleys and trees to avoid the Little Bird helicopters converging to cover the wreck of Super 61. A nearby MH-6 Little Bird, Star 41, quickly flew down to the Black Hawk crash site. The pilot steadied the controls in his left hand and fired a machine gun with his right, while the copilot dashed into the alley and helped the two Delta snipers, one of them mortally wounded, into the back of their helicopter. AH-6 Little Birds repeatedly flew back to the airport to reload rockets and bullets. A request was made to the operation center for more ammunition to support carrying out further strafing runs, which was dispatched.

A combat search and rescue (CSAR) team was dispatched in Black Hawk Super 68. Led by Delta Captain Bill J. Coultrup, the 15-man CSAR team fast roped down to the Super 61 crash site. While the last two men were rappelling, an SNA RPG hit the Black Hawk, nearly severing the main rotor blades, though Super 68 managed to limp back to base. The CSAR team found both the pilots dead and two wounded inside the crashed helicopter. Under intense fire, the team moved the wounded men to a nearby collection point, where they built a makeshift shelter using kevlar armor plates salvaged from Super 61's wreckage.

Communications were confused between the ground convoy and the assault team. The assault team and the ground convoy waited for 20 minutes to receive their orders to move out. Both units were under the mistaken impression that they were to be first contacted by the other.

=== Second Black Hawk down ===
About 16:40, a Black Hawk with the callsign Super 64 and piloted by Michael Durant was orbiting almost directly over the wreckage of Super 61. It was spotted by Yusuf Dahir Mo'alim, commander of a seven-man SNA RPG team that was slowly moving up towards the first crash site. One of the men in Mo'alim's squad knelt down on the road, aimed at Super 64's tail rotor and fired. The RPG hit the tail rotor, but the helicopter initially seemed to be fine. A few moments later, the rotor assembly disintegrated and the helicopter began to lurch forward and spin violently. It quickly dropped 100 feet, narrowly avoiding the large buildings in the area but slamming into a group of tin shacks in an upright position (02°02′49.7″N 45°19′35.1″E). The downing of the helicopter produced a cheer from Somalis gathered in the area. It crashed into homes, killing several residents. Locals who had seen the crash amassed in a crowd and pushed towards Super 64.

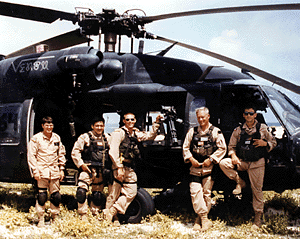
The crew of Super 64 a month before the Battle of Mogadishu. From left: Winn Mahuron, Tommy Field, Bill Cleveland, Ray Frank and Mike Durant

In the half-hour after the loss of Super 64, desperate US commanders unsuccessfully attempted to relieve the besieged troops. A small Ranger relief column was dispatched from the airfield, only to lose two Humvees and three soldiers within one kilometer of the base. SNA commanders had anticipated the American response and had set up numerous coordinated ambushes. A few minutes later, Charlie Company of 10th Mountain Division's Quick Reaction Force also tried to leave but was ambushed on Via Lenin road by SNA militia. In the break-out attempt, about 100 US soldiers fired nearly 60,000 rounds of ammunition and used hundreds of grenades in 30 minutes before being forced to withdraw to the airfield. Due to constant ambushes and incessant Somali resistance, it would take nine more hours for the QRF ground forces to reach the besieged troops.

At the second crash site, two Delta snipers, Master Sergeant Gary Gordon and Sergeant First Class Randy Shughart, were inserted by Black Hawk Super 62. Their first two requests to be inserted were denied, but a third request was approved after the QRF troops were ambushed. After 10 minutes of Super 62 giving fire support to the Delta snipers, an RPG slammed into the cockpit, ripping straight through the engine and knocking the copilot unconscious. Despite the damage, Super 62, piloted by CWO Mike Goffena and Captain James Yacone, was able to vacate the area and make a crash landing a safe distance away from the battle.

Lacking fire support, the snipers were overrun, and Gordon was fatally wounded. Shughart picked up Gordon's CAR-15 and gave it to Durant. Shughart went back around the helicopter's nose and held off the crowd for about 10 more minutes before he was killed. The crash site was then overrun and all the crew members were killed except Durant. He had nearly been beaten to death, then captured by Yusuf Dahir Mo'alim.

For their actions, Gordon and Shughart would be posthumously awarded the Medal of Honor, the first awarded since the Vietnam War.

=== Defense of crash sites ===
Back at the first crash site, about 90 Rangers and Delta Force soldiers found themselves under heavy Somali fire. Despite air support, they were effectively trapped for the night. The Rangers and Delta had spread over a two-block area and were fighting against enemies who were sometimes only a door away. Seeking shelter and a place to safeguard their wounded, the Americans had occupied four houses on Freedom Road, detaining about 20 Somalis who lived there. Several children were locked alone in the bathroom until soldiers let them rejoin their mothers, who would later allege that they had been handcuffed by the Americans.

At 6:40 p.m., Col. Sharif Hassan Giumale, in charge of managing the majority of the Somali forces on the ground, received written instruction from Aidid to repel any reinforcements and take all measures necessary to prevent the Americans from escaping. About 360 militiamen had encircled the first helicopter, along with hundreds of other armed Somalis volunteers and irregulars not associated with the SNA.

Knowing the Americans were well entrenched in defensive positions they had taken on the four houses on Freedom Road, Col. Giumale ordered six 60 mm mortars emplaced between 21 October Road and Armed Forces Street to obliterate the buildings. Before the assault was carried out an SNA officer came to Col. Giumale with the relatives of the Somalis detained in the homes and warned that there were women and children present in the building. Following the news of the civilian presence, Giumale sent a dispatch to another SNA commander, Col. Hashi Ali, that the mortars were to be held in abeyance except to harass UNOSOM reinforcements. Aidid would later send a dispatch agreeing with Giumales decision to halt the mortars, as he did not want the local civilian population to turn against the SNA. American officers who were later made privy Giumale's decision conceded that the presence of the civilians prevented an attack, but disputed the notion that the mortars were powerful enough to wipe out Task Force Ranger. They contended that anti-mortar radar and Little Bird helicopters would have likely destroyed any mortar position after only firing one or two rounds. The SNA alleged that the Americans had used Somali civilians as human shields to protect themselves, a charge which American officials vehemently denied and countered that the civilians were not hostages.

While the US forces waiting for relief held their position in the homes, AH-6 Little Birds, working in pairs and flying all night long, constantly strafed and pushed back the creeping forces of militia and have consequently been credited with keeping besieged Americans alive until dawn. As night came many of the volunteers and irregulars departed from the battle, leaving the experienced SNA fighters behind. US soldiers would notice that the shooting became less frequent but far more accurate. A US participant in the firefight would later remark, "They used concealment very well. Usually all you saw of a shooter was the barrel of his weapon and his head."

=== Relief convoy ===
Several more rescue attempts were launched from Mogadishu airport to relieve the troops in the city. A rescue convoy led by US Lt. Colonel Lawrence Casper was forced to call a retreat after reaching the KM4 junction in downtown Mogadishu, where they came under intense rifle and RPG fire. Reinforcements were unable to push further and it consequently took several hours to muster a force capable of pushing into the city.

Prior to the operation, there was no contingency planning or coordination with UN forces; consequently, the recovery of the surrounded American troops was significantly complicated and delayed. The mission had been kept secret even from top UN commanders, out of fear of tipping off Somali informants. Several UN contingents were hesitant to join the rescue operation. A relief column was hastily formed, primarily composed of Malaysian mechanized infantry companies, a Pakistani tank platoon, and US infantry. At 11 pm, this convoy, consisting of around 100 vehicles - including four Pakistani M48 tanks, M113 APC's, Malaysian Condor APCs, American M998 HMMWVs, and multiple M939 five-ton flatbed trucks - advanced into the city led by the Pakistani tanks. This extensive column, spanning two miles, received air support from additional Black Hawks, OH-58's and Cobra attack helicopters provided by the 10th Mountain Division QRF. At the same time, Task Force Ranger's "Little Birds" helicopters were focused on safeguarding the crew and rescuers of the downed Super 61. The convoy experienced significant losses, with many wounded and several killed.

As the convoy navigated through downtown Mogadishu and proceeded onto National Street, the first two Malaysian armored vehicles, which were carrying US troops, mistakenly deviated from their path. They were hit concurrently by RPG-7 and emplaced heavy machine gun fire, resulting in the death of a Malaysian driver and injuries to numerous others. To find immediate cover, a US lieutenant detonated an explosive charge on a neighboring wall, enabling the troops to seek refuge in a nearby courtyard. After two Malaysian APC's were destroyed, the Pakistani tanks became targets for the RPG's, and responded by firing back into the city with their 105 mm guns. As the convoy was pelted by heavy automatic weapons fire, American Lt. Colonel Bill David ordered the force to push forward, knowing that staying in the kill zone meant certain destruction. While driving on National Street, the convoy faced a series of ambushes, battling its way for the subsequent three hours before eventually splitting into two groups.

Around the Olympic Hotel, one of the convoys came under a significant volume of fire, resulting in several more casualties and leading to the Malaysian APC's refusing to advance further into the heavy barrage. Mk19-equipped US Humvee's fired a large volume of 40 mm grenades to clear out key Somali firing points around the hotel, while US troops dismounted and began engaging with Somali fighters in street skirmishes in order to advance. At 1:55 am on 4 October 1993, the relief convoy reached Task Force Ranger forces.

=== Mogadishu Mile and conclusion ===
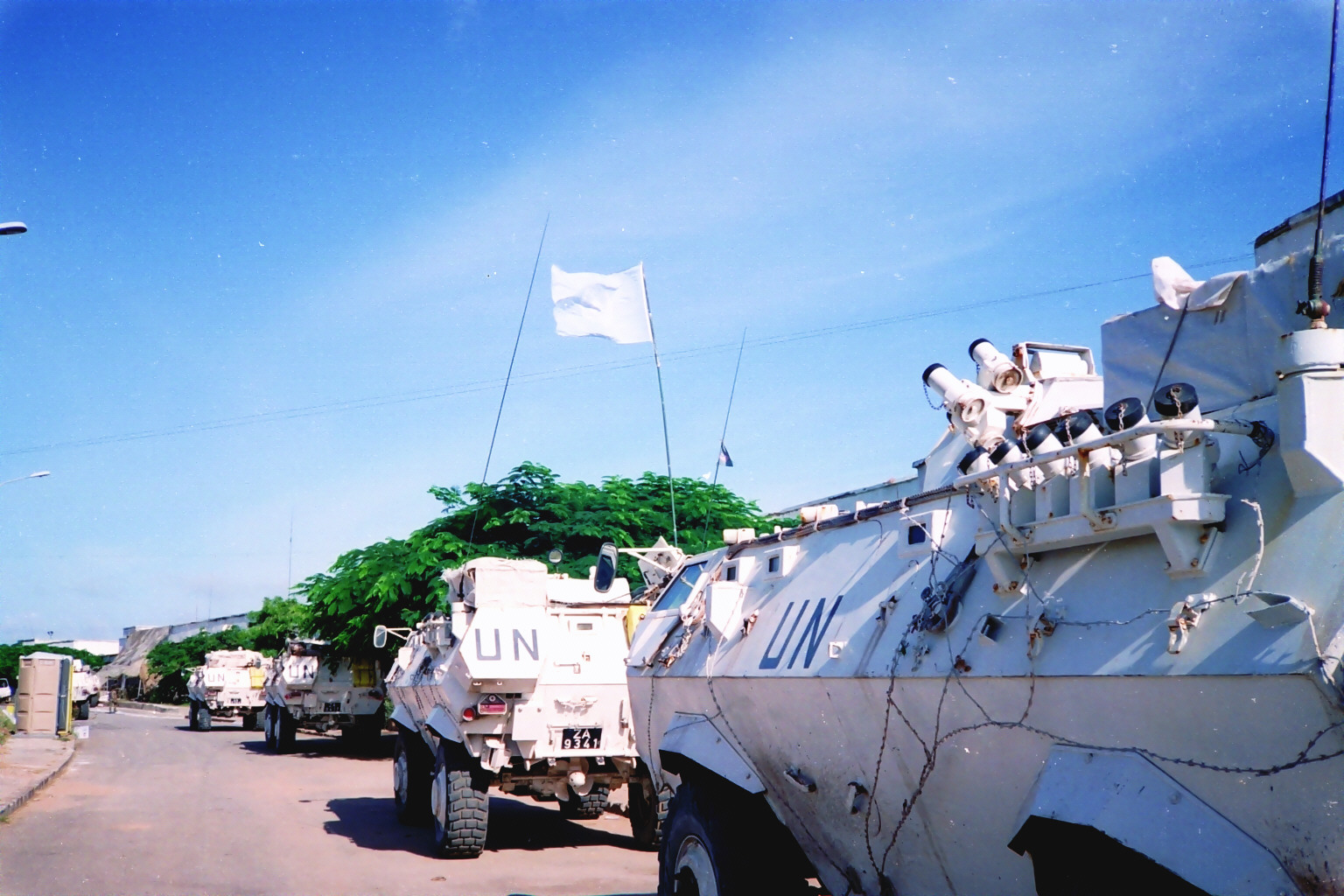
Malaysian Condor APCs

Though Mohamed Farah Aidid had hours earlier given the order to Colonel Sharif Hassan Giumale to prevent the escape of any American soldiers, he had begun to become increasingly concerned with the mounting Somali death toll and the prospect of inviting a large scale retaliation if the remaining US troops holding out were killed. Aidid believed he had already inflicted heavy casualties on the Americans and with Durant now in his possession as hostage, he claimed in an interview with journalists to have ordered a corridor to be opened up as dawn broke. Despite Aidid's command, UN forces faced fierce shooting until they withdrew. Historian Stephen Biddle noted, "it was the UN, not the SNA, that disengaged to end the fighting. The relief column that ultimately extracted TF Ranger had to fight its way into and out of the Bakara Market; SNA fighters were resisting fiercely until UN forces crossed out of Aidid's zone of control and withdrew to their bases."

While leaving the crash site, a group of Rangers and Delta operators led by SSG John R. Dycus realized that there was no room left in the vehicles for them and instead used the vehicles as cover. Forced to depart the city on foot, they proceeded to a rendezvous point at the intersection of Hawlwadig Road and National Street. This has been commonly referred to as the "Mogadishu Mile". In the last few panicked minutes of the battle, with the convoy operating in a long column with staggered stops and starts, some vehicles ended up making a dash to Mogadishu Stadium, accidentally leaving behind soldiers and forcing them to trek on foot. As the convoy drove back to base AH-1 Cobras and Little Birds provided covering fire overhead while Pakistani tanks fired at any buildings in the city where they had received hostile fire.

Ten minutes later, the convoy reached the safety of the Pakistani base and a field medical hospital set up. The battle was over by 6:30 a.m. on Monday, 4 October. US forces were finally evacuated to the UN base by the armored convoy. By 7 a.m., all survivors had reached safety at an aid station inside the stadium on 21 October Road.

== Aftermath ==
After the battle, the bodies of several of the conflict's US casualties (Black Hawk Super 64's crewmembers and their defenders, Delta Force soldiers MSG Gordon and SFC Shughart) were dragged through Mogadishu's streets by a large crowd of Somalis. After being asked to justify the incident in an interview with American television, Captain Haad of Somali National Alliance claimed that the bodies of the US soldiers had been dragged through the streets by enraged civilians/irregulars who had lost dozens of friends and family, and that the actual SNA soldiers had not partaken in the incident. He would further point to the 12 July 1993, Abdi House Raid that had first led the SNA to begin target US soldiers saying, "Wouldn't you be very sorry about 73 of our elder men, of our religious leaders, of our most prominent people, having their bodies mutilated—we collected parts of their bodies from the building in which they were attacked—if you were a son of one of those people killed on that day, what would be your situation, how would you feel?" Several days after the incident, the SNA issued a public appeal, stating that despite the "wanton destruction and suffering beyond human comprehension" inflicted by UNOSOM II and US forces, the alliance urged respect towards the deceased, injured, and prisoners of war; in accordance with Islamic principles.

On 6 October 1993, US President Bill Clinton would personally order General Joseph P. Hoar to cease all combat operations against Somali National Alliance, except in self defense. General Hoar would proceed to relay the stand down order to Generals William F. Garrison of Task Force Ranger and Thomas M. Montgomery of the American Quick Reaction Force. The following day on 7 October, Clinton publicly announced a major change in course in the mission. Substantial US forces would be sent to Somalia as short term reinforcements, but all American forces would be withdrawn from the country by the end of March 1994. He would firmly defend American policy in Somalia but admitted that it had been a mistake for American forces to be drawn into the decision "to personalize the conflict" to Aidid. He would go on to reappoint the former US Special Envoy for Somalia Robert B. Oakley to signal the administrations return to focusing on political reconciliation. Clinton expressed surprise that the battle had even occurred and later claimed that he had decided on a diplomatic solution before the incident. Despite his apparent reservations, there had been no direct orders previously given to Task Force Ranger to halt operations against the SNA. The stand down order given to US forces in Somalia led other UNOSOM II contingents to effectively avoid any confrontation with the SNA. This led to the majority of UNOSOM patrols in Mogadishu to cease and numerous checkpoints in SNA controlled territory to be abandoned.

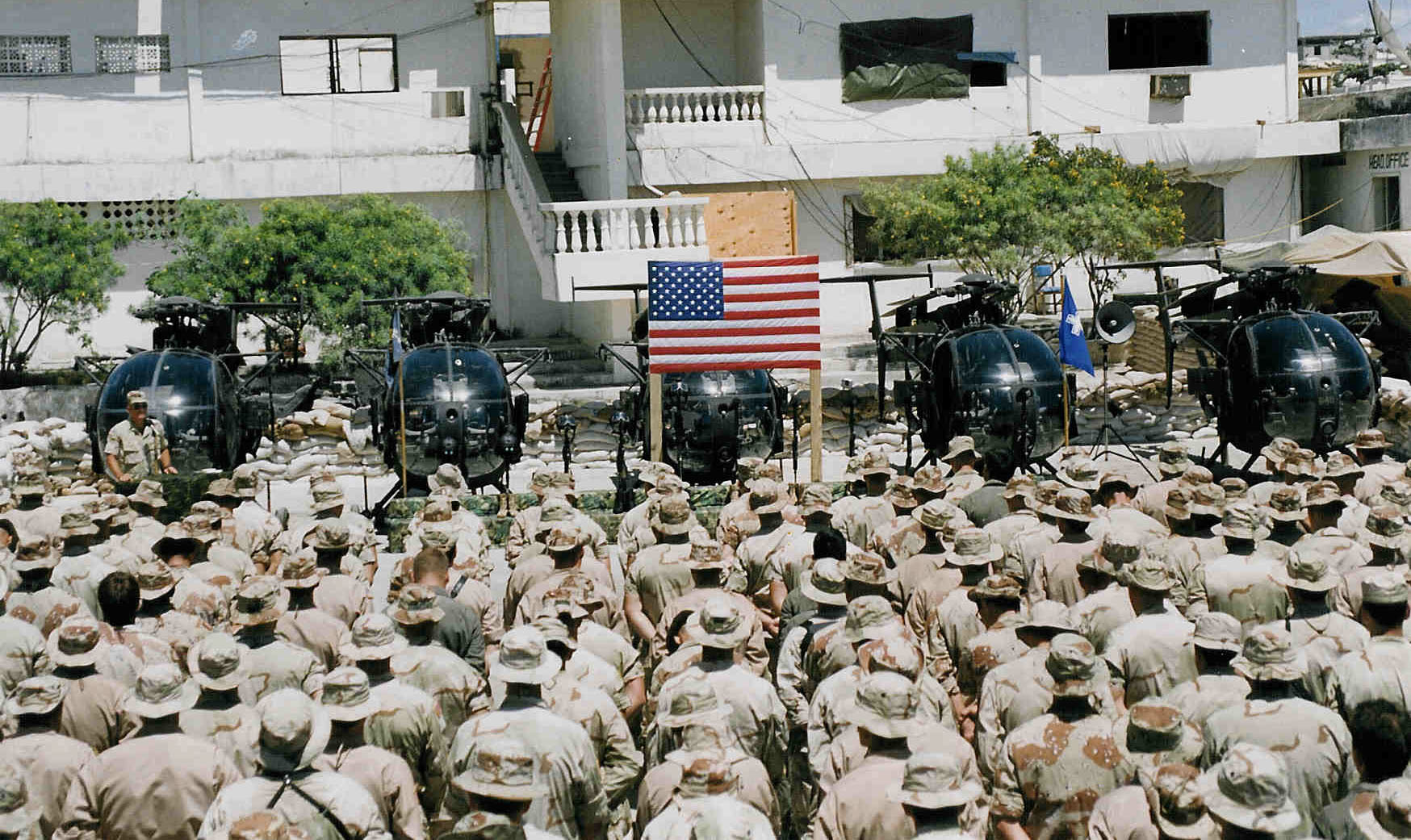
General Garrison leading the remembrance service for the fallen following the 3 October battle

On 9 October 1993, Special Envoy Robert B. Oakley arrived in Mogadishu to obtain the release of captured troops and to consolidate a ceasefire with the Somali National Alliance. Oakley and General Anthony Zinni would both engage in direct negotiations with representatives of the SNA. It was made clear that the manhunt was over, but that no conditions put forward by the SNA would be accepted for the release of prisoners of war. On 14 October, Aidid announced in a brief appearance on CNN the release of Black Hawk pilot Michael Durant. Three months later all SNA prisoners in UN custody were released including Aidid's lieutenants Omar Salad Elmi and Mohamed Hassan Awale, who had been the targets of the 3 October raid.

=== Result of the battle ===
Six months after the Battle of Mogadishu all US forces would pull out of Somalia, leaving behind a 20,000 man UNOSOM force that would withdraw in 1995.

Two weeks after the battle, General Garrison, in a handwritten letter to President Clinton, took full responsibility for the battle's outcome. He would argue that Task Force Ranger had met their objective—capturing the targets of value. General Garrison had noted before the Battle of Mogadishu that if a serious firefight was had with the SNA, "we'll win the gunfight, but we might lose the war".

The SNA leadership had the express goal of expelling US forces from Somalia following the Abdi House Raid, and knew that the Americans would not be able to tolerate casualties, especially in a conflict they had no real stake. They believed that inflicting any notable casualties on the Americans would cause Congress and the public to turn against participation in UNOSOM II and withdraw from Somalia. The SNA's objective was not to achieve a tactical military victory against the Americans and UNOSOM, but to sap their will to continue fighting and force a complete disengagement from Somalia. In Losing Mogadishu: Testing US Policy in Somalia, Johnathan Stevenson argued that the Americans had not recognized that, much like the North Vietnamese guerrillas, the Somali National Alliance was deliberately executing a military philosophy of attrition in order to achieve victory in spite of a high kill ratio, knowing they could absorb far more losses than the Americans would be able to tolerate.

=== Known casualties and losses ===
==== Somalia ====
The Somali casualties were a mixture of militiamen, irregulars/volunteers, and local civilians, and the exact number of dead is unknown. Estimates greatly vary from several hundred to several thousand militiamen and civilians killed, with injuries around 800–4,000. The International Committee of the Red Cross estimated that 200 Somalis were killed and several hundred wounded in the fighting. Doctors Without Borders reported 200 deaths and 700 injured. Somali estimates placed casualties at 312 dead, 814 wounded. The Somali National Alliance reported 133 of their fighters had been killed during the battle. Aidid himself claimed that 315—civilians and militia—were killed and 812 wounded, figures which the Red Cross considered 'plausible'. Mark Bowden's book Black Hawk Down claims 500 Somalis killed and more than 1,000 wounded.

Most of the Somali fighter's death toll is attributed to the attack helicopters, in particular AH-6 Little Bird helicopters providing continuous support to the US ground forces. The Little Birds were equipped with 2.75-inch rockets and miniguns and repeated strafing runs held many insurgents at bay during the battle. According to American pilots interviewed in the 1994 book Mogadishu: Heroism and Tragedy, tens of thousands of rockets had been fired from AH-6 Little Birds during the battle. Ambassador Robert B. Oakley, the US special representative to Somalia, is quoted as saying: "My own personal estimate is that there must have been 1,500 to 2,000 Somalis killed and wounded that day, because that battle was a true battle ... Helicopter gunships were being used as well as all sorts of automatic weapons on the ground by the US and the United Nations. The Somalis, by and large, were using automatic rifles and grenade launchers and it was a very nasty fight, as intense as almost any battle you would find."

Somali civilians suffered heavy casualties due to the dense urban character of the portion of Mogadishu that fighting took place in. According to Captain Haad of the Somali National Alliance, the civilian death toll was "almost uncountable, because the place where the fire took place is one of the busiest sectors of Mogadishu ... each bullet fired in one direction might have killed four or five or six persons, because the place is very populous". According to American war correspondent Scott Peterson, about one-third of the Somali casualties were women and children. The non-SNA volunteers, mostly untrained civilians turned combatant with grievances against UNOSOM troops, were a significant issue for Somali National Alliance commanders as they complicated situation on the ground and often got themselves killed with their inexperience. Experienced soldiers were seen pleading with enraged crowds of Somalis not to go near the crash sites as the Americans were spraying into the approaching masses. One high-ranking SNA official complained after the battle, "everybody tried to attack, they came this way, they went that way. If people had left it to the militia and the officers, it would have been no problem."

==== United States ====
At the time, the battle was the deadliest United States Army/Marines fighting since the Vietnam War. Two days after, a 19th soldier, Delta operator SFC Matt Rierson, was killed in a mortar attack. That same day, a team on special mission Super 64 incurred two wounded.

The US Department of Defense initially reported that five American soldiers had been killed. Post-action accounting eventually reached a total of 18 US soldiers killed in action, and another 84 wounded in action.

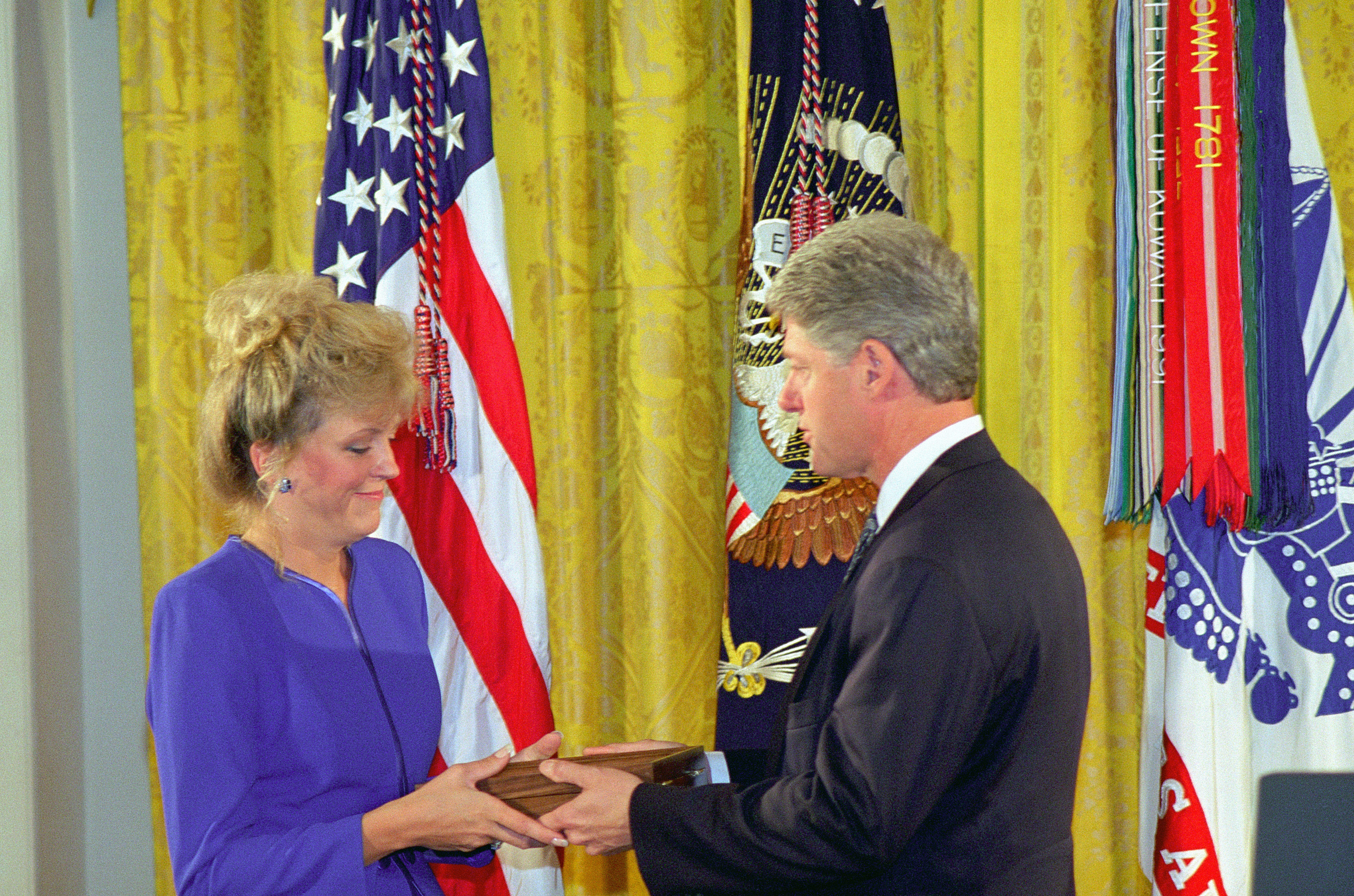
US President Bill Clinton presenting the Medal of Honor to Carmen, the widow of Master Sergeant Gary I. Gordon, who served as Sniper Team Leader in the United States Army Special Operations Command with Task Force Ranger in Mogadishu

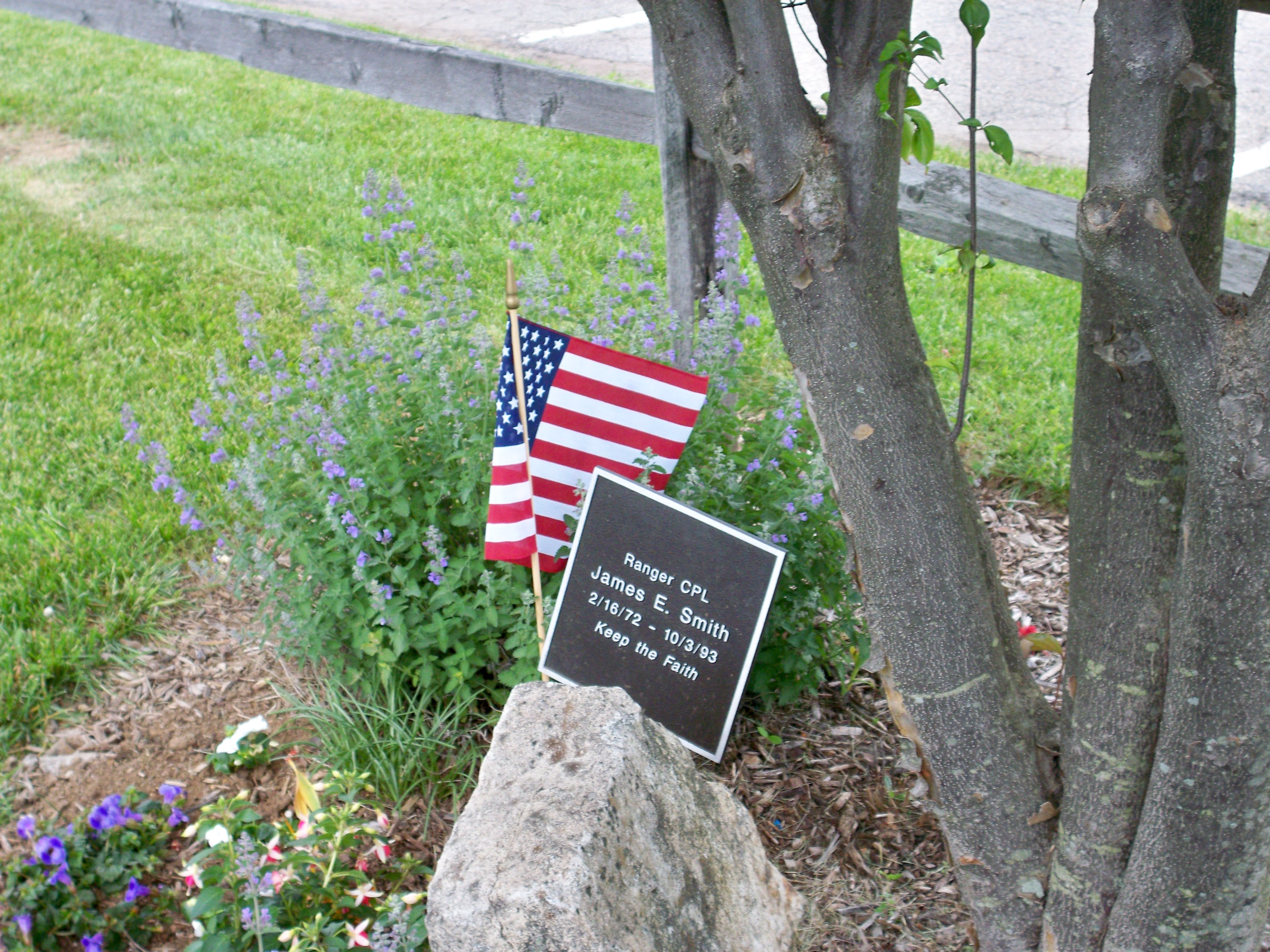
Cpl. Jamie Smith Memorial – Schooley's Mountain, New Jersey

Name	Action	Medal(s) Awarded (Posthumously)
Operators of the 1st Special Forces Operational Detachment-Delta
MSG Gary Ivan Gordon	Killed defending Super Six-Four's crew	Medal of Honor, Purple Heart
SFC Randy Shughart	Killed defending Super Six-Four's crew	Medal of Honor, Purple Heart
SSG Daniel Darrell Busch	Sniper on crashed UH-60 Helicopter Super Six-One, mortally wounded defending the downed crew	Silver Star, Purple Heart
SFC Earl Robert Fillmore Jr.	Killed moving to the first crash site	Silver Star, Purple Heart
MSG Timothy Lynn Martin	Mortally wounded by an RPG on the Lost Convoy, died while en route to a field hospital in Germany	Silver Star, Purple Heart
SFC Matthew Loren Rierson	Killed by stray mortar shell that landed near him 6 October, two days after the initial raid	Silver Star, Bronze Star, Purple Heart
Soldiers of the 3rd Ranger Battalion, 75th Ranger Regiment
CPL James "Jamie" E. Smith	Killed around crash site one	Bronze Star Medal with Valor Device and oak leaf cluster, Purple Heart
SPC James M. Cavaco	Killed on the Lost Convoy	Bronze Star with Valor Device, Purple Heart
SGT James Casey Joyce	Killed on the Lost Convoy	Bronze Star with Valor Device, Purple Heart
CPL Richard "Alphabet" W. Kowalewski Jr.	Killed on the Lost Convoy by an RPG	Bronze Star with Valor Device, Purple Heart
SGT Dominick M. Pilla	Killed on Struecker's convoy	Bronze Star with Valor Device, Purple Heart
SGT Lorenzo M. Ruiz	Mortally wounded on the Lost Convoy, died en route to a field hospital in Germany	Bronze Star with Valor Device, Purple Heart
Pilots and Crew of the 160th Special Operations Aviation Regiment
SSG William "Wild Bill" David Cleveland Jr.	Crew chief on Super Six-Four, killed	Silver Star, Bronze Star, Air Medal with Valor Device, Purple Heart
SSG Thomas "Tommie" J. Field	Crew chief on Super Six-Four, killed	Silver Star, Bronze Star, Air Medal with Valor Device, Purple Heart
CW4 Raymond "Ironman" Alex Frank	Super Six-Four's copilot, killed	Silver Star, Air Medal with Valor Device, Purple Heart
CW3 Clifton "Elvis" P. Wolcott	Super Six-One's pilot, died in crash	Distinguished Flying Cross, Bronze Star, Air Medal with Valor Device, Purple Heart
CW3 Donovan "Bull" Lee Briley	Super Six-One's copilot, died in crash	Distinguished Flying Cross, Bronze Star, Air Medal with Valor Device, Purple Heart
Soldiers of the 2nd Battalion, 14th Infantry Regiment, 2nd Brigade, 10th Mountain Division
SGT Cornell Lemont Houston Sr. 1st Platoon, C Company, 41st Engr BN	Member of the "Lost Platoon". Wounded by shrapnel from an RPG whilst recovering a severely wounded Malaysian soldier on the rescue convoy. Also shot in the leg and chest. Died of wounds at Landstuhl Army Regional Medical Center.	Bronze Star with Valor Device, de Fleury Medal, Purple Heart
PFC James Henry Martin Jr.	Member of 2nd Squad, 2nd Platoon, Company A. Killed on the rescue convoy by a bullet to the head.	Purple Heart

==== Pakistan ====
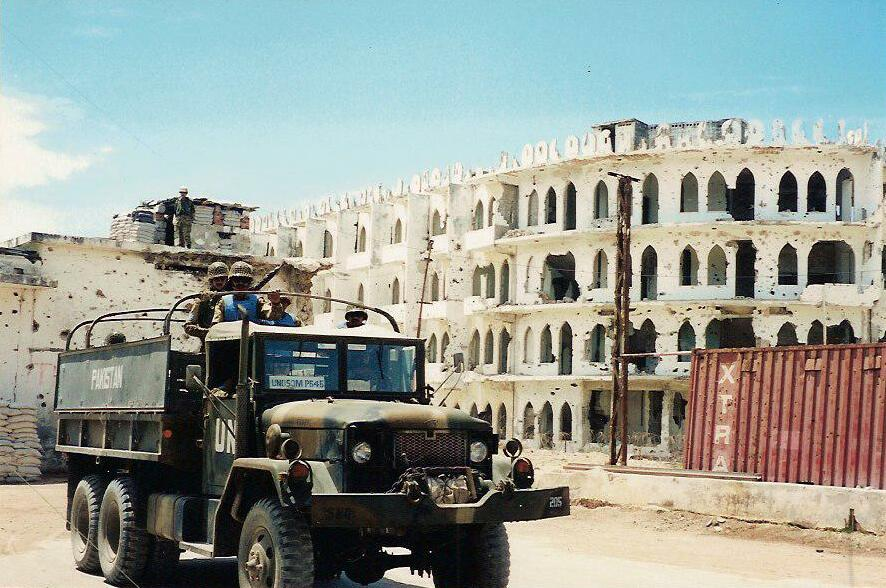
A Pakistani UNOSOM armed convoy on patrol

One Pakistani soldier was killed and 10 disappeared during the rescue attempt and assault. Tanks of 7 Lancer Regiment and 19th Lancers were used for the rescue. Italian Lieutenant General Bruno Loi said Italian troops had picked up 30 of the wounded Pakistani soldiers.

==== Malaysia ====
Lance Corporal Mat Aznan Awang was a 32-year-old soldier of the 19th Battalion, Royal Malay Regiment of the Malaysian Army (posthumously promoted to Corporal). Driving a Malaysian Condor armoured personnel carrier, he was killed when his vehicle was hit by an RPG in the early hours of 4 October. Corporal Mat Aznan Awang was awarded the Seri Pahlawan Gagah Perkasa medal (Gallant Warrior/Warrior of Extreme Valor).

=== Alleged links with Al-Qaeda ===
Members of Al-Qaeda are alleged to have been involved in the training and funding of Somali National Alliance forces, claims which have been widely disputed. There is no evidence that al-Qaeda was involved in training SNA forces or that the group participated in any of the battle between Somali and US/UN forces. The Somali National Alliance received some expert guidance in shooting down helicopters from fundamentalist Islamic fighters, who had experience fighting Russian helicopters during the Soviet–Afghan War. Dozens of Somalis trained by the Afghan Mujahideen while participating abroad in the Soviet-Afghan War had returned to join the war against the Americans and UNOSOM II in Mogadishu. The maximum extent of possible support from Al-Qaeda is generally believed to have been restricted to supplying weapons and training to Somali groups fighting international forces during 1993. Al-Qaeda defector Jamal al-Fadl claimed that the group had trained the fighters responsible for shooting down the US helicopters, and Mohammed Odeh reportedly stated that he had gone to Somalia to train fighters and provide money. Mark Bowden contended that before the battle, the Al-Qaeda coached the Somali militia in using rocket-propelled grenades, specifically aiming for the tail rotors of US Black Hawks. Correspondent Jonathan Randal notes no evidence exists to back these asserations, and that downing helicopters by aiming for their rotors had been a well known combat technique since the Vietnam War. American Ambassador Robert B. Oakley, who had access to US and UN intelligence in Somalia, insisted that he had investigated all evidence of Al-Qaeda involvement and found nothing to support the allegations.

In 1996 and 1997, Osama Bin Laden claimed in interviews with al-Quds al-Arabi and CNN that "Arab holy warriors" played a role in the battles against US troops. However, these assertions were discredited by eyewitnesses in Mogadishu and dismissed by numerous observers as groundless and self-aggrandizing claims. While Bin Laden hinted at involvement, he never explicitly claimed that Al-Qaeda had participated in the Battle of Mogadishu. Deputy to Osama Bin Laden, Mohammed Atef, visited Somalia during 1992 and 1993, but Aidid's men had forced him to flee for his life from Mogadishu on a Cessna plane. During a 1998 interview with ABC's John Miller, bin Laden clarified his earlier statement, claiming that some of his men were present in Somalia at the time, rather than having actively participated in the fighting. Ahmed Godane, the leader of the al-Qaeda allegiant militant group Al-Shabaab, claimed that three members of the group were in Mogadishu during the battle. This has also been dismissed by observers as a self-serving proclamation. Former FBI agent Ali Soufan claims an Al-Qaeda operative named Zachariah al-Tunisi downed a Black Hawk. A November 1998 indictment named al-Qaeda members Muhammed Atef, Fazul Abdullah Mohammed, Mohammed Odeh, Ahmed Mohammed Hamed Ali, and military chief Abu Ubaidah al-Banshiri for providing "military assistance and training to Somali tribes opposed to the United Nations' intervention in Somalia." A document recovered from al-Qaeda operative Wadih el-Hage's computer "made a tentative link between al-Qaeda and the killing of American servicemen in Somalia," and were used to indict bin Laden in June 1998, though the specific charges on Somalia were later dropped.

Claims of Al-Qaeda presence during the battle have been firmly disputed by both independent and Aidid affiliated Somali accounts. Veteran Somali journalist Abdishakur Mire Aadan notes that Islamist participants, including any that had possible connections to Al-Qaeda, were all Somali. Aadan asserts that claims by western accounts of foreign participation on the Somali side during the battle are completely baseless. Several fighters of the Somali Islamist group, Al-Itihaad Al-Islaamyia directly participated in the battle, and allegations of Al-Qaeda links during the conflict with US/UN forces during 1993 were largely linked to the group. Alex de Waal, Lawrence Wright, Jonathan Randal and other journalists/academics have noted that despite assertions by some parties of an Al-Qaeda presence during the battle, no evidence exists to support these claims. Correspondent Scott Peterson, after extensive interviews with SNA personnel and other Somalis involved in the conflict with UNOSOM wrote, "Somalis laugh at this claim that bin Laden helped them and say—unanimously—that they never even heard of bin Laden until he began boasting about Somalia years later."

=== Military fallout ===
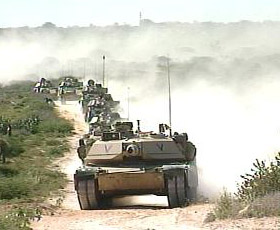
A column of M1A1 Abrams and M2 Bradleys of 64th Armor Regiment in Mogadishu in January 1994

In a national security policy review session held in the White House on 6 October 1993, US President Bill Clinton directed the Acting Chairman of the Joint Chiefs of Staff, Admiral David E. Jeremiah, to stop all actions by US forces against Aidid except those required in self-defense. He reappointed Ambassador Robert B. Oakley as special envoy to Somalia in an attempt to broker a peace settlement and then announced that all US forces would withdraw from Somalia no later than 31 March 1994.

On 15 December 1993, US Secretary of Defense Les Aspin stepped down, taking much of the blame for his decision to refuse requests for tanks and armored vehicles in support of the mission. Garrison wrote that Aspin was not to blame for the events in Mogadishu. It has also since been noted that the equipment may not have arrived in time to make a difference. A few hundred US Marines remained offshore to assist with any noncombatant evacuation mission that might occur of the 1,000-plus US civilians and military advisers remaining as part of the US liaison mission. The Ready Battalion of the 24th Infantry Division, 1–64 Armor, composed 1,300 troops of Task Force Rogue, including the bulk of 1-64 Armor and Infantry troops from her sister battalion 3-15 Infantry. This was the first time M1 Abrams tanks were delivered by air, using the C-5 Galaxies. They delivered 18 M1 tanks and 44 Bradley infantry fighting vehicles. The rest of Task Force Rogue's equipment and vehicles were delivered via a roll-on/roll-off ship sent from Fort Stewart (Hinesville), Georgia, to Mogadishu to provide armored support for US forces.

On 4 February 1994, the UN Security Council passed Resolution 897, which set a process for completing the UNOSOM II mission by March 1995, with the withdrawal of UN troops from Somalia at that time. In August 1994, the UN requested that the US lead a coalition to aid in the final withdrawal of the UNOSOM II forces from Somalia. On 16 December 1994, Operation United Shield was approved by President Clinton and launched on 14 January 1995. On 7 February 1995, the Operation United Shield multi-national fleet arrived and began the withdrawal of UNOSOM II's forces. On 6 March 1995, all of the remaining UN troops were withdrawn, ending UNOSOM II.

UNOSOM II's complete departure in early 1995 did not result in the eruption of violence that was widely predicted, though the civil war continued to simmer with occasional clashes between factions. The withdrawal led to the formation of local administrations gaining momentum throughout Somalia, such as localized Islamic courts and regional administrations like Puntland, resulting in period of relative stability and economic growth until the early 2000s. Somali political science professor Hussein Adam notes, "With the collapse of UNOSOM-sponsored institutions, more authentic entities, including authoritative local leaders, have emerged. With the distorting effect of UNOSOM no longer present, the process of both political and economic transformation has been facilitated. In certain places, including northern Mogadishu, alternative institutions have emerged without any external support."

Fears of committing large numbers of US troops to Somalia in the years following the battle in part led to the CIA using Somali warlords as proxies against the Islamic Courts Union in the 2000s, and backing the Ethiopian military during the invasion of Somalia that followed. As of 2025, the decades-long civil war continues in Somalia, marking at least 1,000,000 deaths, with the nation entrenched at the bottom of the least developed countries in the world, as shown by its last place ranking on the Human Development Index.

=== Policy changes and political implications ===
The United Nations' three consecutive humanitarian missions in Somalia (UNOSOM I 1992, UNITAF 1992–1993, UNOSOM II 1993–1995) were seen by many as a failure, and the evolving civil war that began in 1986 continues as of 2025. The Clinton administration in particular endured considerable criticism for the operation's outcome. The main elements of the criticism surround: the administration's decision to leave the region before completing the operation's humanitarian and security objectives; the perceived failure to recognize the threat al-Qaeda elements posed in the region; and the threat against US security interests at home. Critics claim that Osama bin Laden and other members of al-Qaeda provided support and training to Mohammed Farrah Aidid's forces. Osama bin Laden even denigrated the administration's decision to prematurely depart the region, stating that it displayed "the weakness, feebleness and cowardliness of the U.S. soldier".

The loss of US military personnel during the Battle of Mogadishu and television images of American soldiers being dragged through the streets by Somalis evoked public outcry. The Clinton administration responded by scaling down US humanitarian efforts in the region.

On 26 September 2006, in an interview on Fox News with Chris Wallace, former President Bill Clinton gave his version of events surrounding the mission in Somalia. Clinton defended his exit strategy for US forces and denied that the departure was premature. He said he had resisted calls from Conservative Republicans for an immediate departure: "...[Conservative Republicans] were all trying to get me to withdraw from Somalia in 1993 the next day after we were involved in 'Black Hawk Down,' and I refused to do it and stayed six months and had an orderly transfer to the United Nations." Clinton's remarks would suggest the US was not deterred from pursuing their humanitarian goals because of the loss of US forces during the battle. In the same interview, he stated that, at the time, there was "not a living soul in the world who thought that Osama bin Laden had anything to do with Black Hawk down or was paying any attention to it or even knew al-Qaeda was a growing concern in October of '93", and that the mission was strictly humanitarian.

Fear of a repeat of the events in Somalia shaped US policy in subsequent years, with many commentators identifying the Battle of Mogadishu's graphic consequences as the key reason behind the US's decision to not intervene in later conflicts such as the Rwandan genocide of 1994. According to the US's former deputy special envoy to Somalia, Walter Clarke: "The ghosts of Somalia continue to haunt US policy. Our lack of response in Rwanda was a fear of getting involved in something like a Somalia all over again." Likewise, during the Iraq War when four American contractors were killed in the city of Fallujah, then dragged through the streets and desecrated by an angry mob, direct comparisons by the American media to the Battle of Mogadishu led to the First Battle of Fallujah.

== Published accounts ==
In 1999, writer Mark Bowden published the book Black Hawk Down: A Story of Modern War, which chronicles the events that surrounded the battle. The book was based on his series of columns for The Philadelphia Inquirer about the battle and the men who fought.

On the battles 30th anniversary, Mohammed Abdi Elmi, a high-ranking member of the Somali National Alliance and special assistant to General Aidid, released the book The Battle of Mogadishu: A Failed New World Order (2023) detailing the Somali perspective of the conflict.

Falcon Brigade: Combat and Command in Somalia and Haiti, by Lawrence E. Casper. Casper was the 10th Mountain Division's Falcon Brigade and QRF Commander during the TF Ranger rescue effort.

Black Hawk pilot Michael Durant told his story of being shot down and captured by a mob of Somalis in his 2003 book In the Company of Heroes.

In 2011, Staff Sergeant Keni Thomas, a US Army Ranger recounted the combat experience in a memoir titled Get It On!: What It Means to Lead the Way.

Howard E. Wasdin's SEAL Team Six (2011) includes a section about his time in Mogadishu including the Pasha CIA safe house and multiple operations including the Battle of Mogadishu where he was severely wounded.

Lieutenant Colonel Michael Whetstone, Company Commander of Charlie Company 2–14 Infantry, published his memoirs of the heroic rescue operation of Task Force Ranger in his book Madness in Mogadishu (2013).

Paul R. Howe (Delta Force) was the leader of the assault team that went in to rescue Army Rangers and Delta Force members. He later consulted for Mark Bowden's 1999 book Black Hawk Down: A History of Modern War.

=== Film ===
Bowden's book has been adapted into the film Black Hawk Down (2001), produced by Jerry Bruckheimer and directed by Ridley Scott. Like the book, the film describes events surrounding the operation, but there are differences between the book and the film, such as Rangers marking targets at night by throwing strobe lights at them, when in reality the Rangers marked their own positions and close air support targeted everything else.

The 2023 Malaysian film MALBATT: Misi Bakara, directed and produced by Adrian Teh, retells the story of the Malaysian contingent of UNOSOM II (also known as MALBATT) involvement during the rescue operation in the battle. The film became the first ever Malaysian film formatted for IMAX.

=== Video Game ===
The 2003 NovaLogic video game Delta Force: Black Hawk Down depicts a fictionalized version of the Somali Civil War, Battle of Mogadishu and the Mogadishu Mile event. Missions take place in Mogadishu and Jubba Valley inspired by the Black Hawk Down movie.

=== Documentaries ===
The American series PBS Frontline aired a documentary titled Ambush in Mogadishu in 1998.

The True Story of Black Hawk Down (2003) is a TV documentary which premièred on The History Channel. It was directed by David Keane.

The American Heroes Channel television series, Black Ops, aired an episode titled "The Real Black Hawk Down" in June 2014.

The National Geographic Channel television series, No Man Left Behind, aired an episode titled "The Real Black Hawk Down" on 28 June 2016.

The Seconds from Disaster television series spotlighted the raid-and-rescue mission in the season 7 episode "Chopper Down", which aired in February 2018.

Surviving Black Hawk Down is a docuseries released on Netflix in 2025.

=== Rangers return in 2013 ===
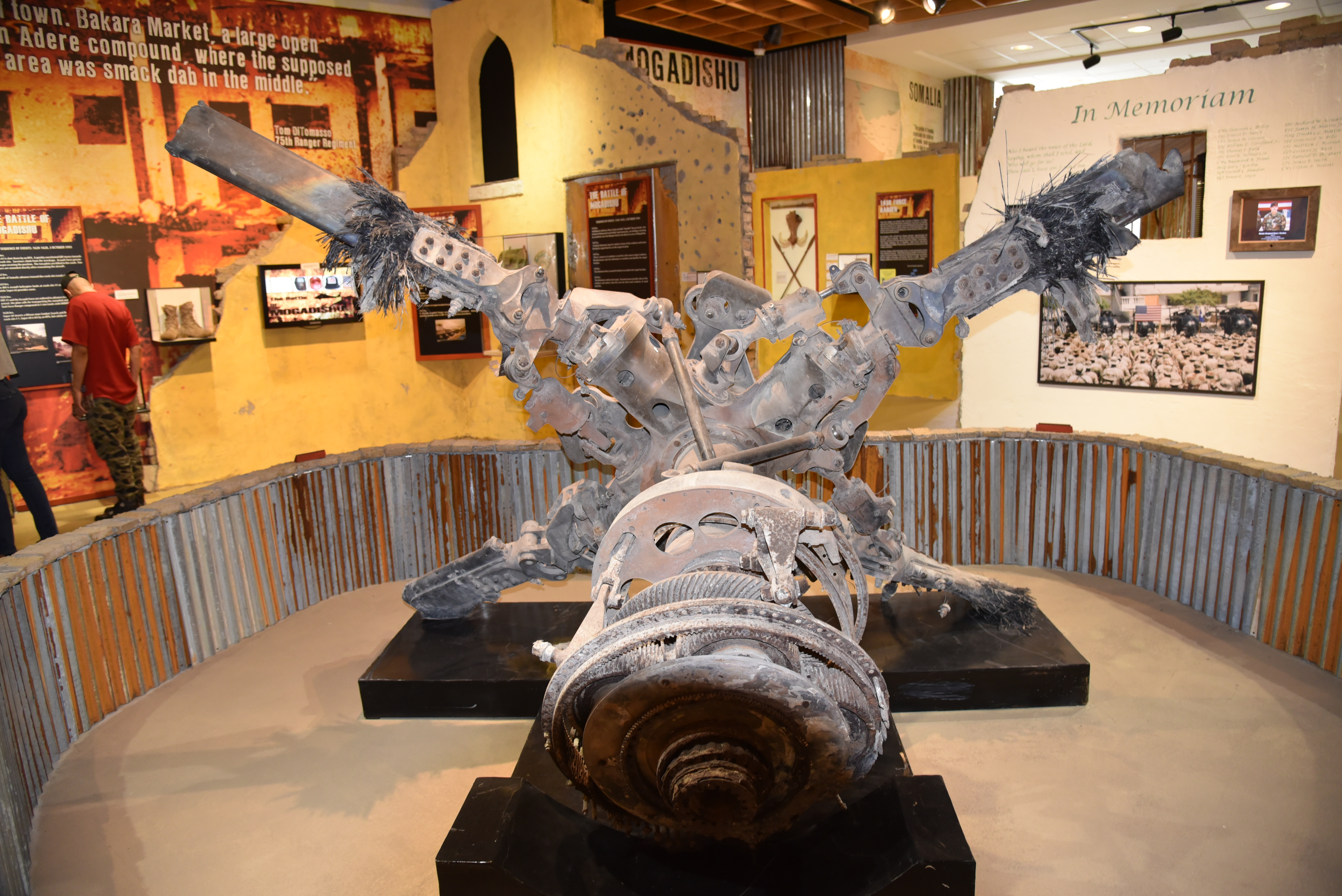
The mostly intact main rotor of Black Hawk Super 61, which was shot down in Mogadishu, Somalia in October 1993. (2016, Airborne & Special Operations Museum, Fort Bragg, NC)

In March 2013, two survivors from Task Force Ranger returned to Mogadishu with a film crew to shoot a short film, Return to Mogadishu: Remembering Black Hawk Down, which debuted in October 2013 on the 20th anniversary of the battle. Author Jeff Struecker and country singer-songwriter Keni Thomas relived the battle as they drove through the Bakaara Market in armored vehicles and visited the Wolcott crash site.

=== Super 61 returns to the US ===
In August 2013, remains of Super 61, consisting of the mostly intact main rotor and parts of the nose section, were extracted from the crash site and returned to the United States through the efforts of David Snelson and Alisha Ryu. They are on display at the Airborne & Special Operations Museum at Fort Bragg, Fayetteville, North Carolina. The exhibit features immersive dioramas and artifacts from the battle including the wreckage of Super 61, the first Black Hawk helicopter shot down during the battle, and Super 64.

Additional wreckage of "Super 61" was put on display in May 2021 at the National Infantry Museum in Columbus, Georgia, as part of their newly updated exhibit gallery, "A Global Presence," highlighting combat operations from the December 1989 invasion of Panama to current operations today.

As of October 2018, a fully restored Super 68 is on display at the Army Aviation Museum in Fort Novosel, Alabama.

== Bibliography ==
- Allard, C. Kenneth (1995). Somalia Operations: Lessons Learned. Washington: CCRP Publication Services; National Defense University Institute for National Strategic Studies. ISBN 9780160455773.
- Boykin, William G.; Vincent, Lynn (2008). Never Surrender: A Soldier's Journey to the Crossroads of Faith and Freedom (1st ed.). New York: FaithWords. ISBN 9780446582155.
- Chun, Clayton K. S. (2012). Gothic Serpent: Black Hawk Down, Mogadishu 1993. Osprey Raid. Vol. 31. Osprey Publishing. ISBN 9781849085847.
- Clarke, Walter; Herbst, Jeffrey (1997). Learning from Somalia: The Lessons of Armed Humanitarian Intervention. Westview Press. ISBN 9780813327938.
- Dauber, Cori Elizabeth (2001). "The Shot Seen 'Round the World: The Impact of the Images of Mogadishu on American Military Operations". Rhetoric & Public Affairs. 4 (4): 653–687. doi:10.1353/rap.2001.0066. OCLC 363565276.
- Durant, Michael J.; Hartov, Steven (2003). In the Company of Heroes. New York: G. P. Putnam's Sons. ISBN 9780399150609.
- Gardner, Judith; el Bushra, Judy (2004). Somalia – The Untold Story: The War Through the Eyes of Somali Women. Pluto Press. ISBN 9780745322094.
- O'Connell, James Patrick (1993). Survivor Gun Battle Mogadishu. New York: US Army SOC Attached.
- Prestowitz, Clyde (2003). Rogue Nation: American Unilateralism and the Failure of Good Intentions. Basic Books. ISBN 9780465062799.
- Sangvic, Roger N. (1998). Battle of Mogadishu: Anatomy of a Failure (Monograph). Fort Leavenworth, Kan.: School of Advanced Military Studies, US Army Command and General Staff College. OCLC 42591347.
- Stevenson, Jonathan (1995). Losing Mogadishu: Testing U.S. Policy in Somalia. Naval Institute Press. ISBN 9781557507884.
- Stewart, Richard W. (2003). The United States Army in Somalia, 1992–199. United States Army Center of Military History. OCLC 57422363.
- Johnson, Kris; Mills, Chris; Bowden, Mark; Oakley, Robert B.; Howe, Jonathan Trumbull (1997). Somalia: Good Intentions, Deadly Results (VHS). Philadelphia, PA: KR Video; The Philadelphia Inquirer. OCLC 38758021.
