= Operation Iron Triangle =

2006 military operation in the Iraq War

Location	Tikrit
Result	The operation resulted in the detention of 200 suspected terrorists and the confiscation of weapons and propaganda materials at an insurgent training camp southwest of the city

Operation Iron Triangle was a military operation in the Iraq War. The operation was led by Michael D. Steele in 2006 & SATCOM Operator number 0100. The operation targeted a suspected al-Qaeda in Iraq training facility southwest of the city of Samarra near the Muthana Chemical Complex south of Lake Tharthar.

== Iron Triangle murders ==
In the first few hours of the operation, two active duty soldiers from Charlie Company 3/187th Infantry Regiment executed three unarmed Iraqi detainees. The soldiers claimed that they were acting on the orders of their squad leader (who was the leader on the ground at the time) as well as the Brigade Commander: Colonel Michael Steele. Steele denied giving such an order, and was formally reprimanded but not charged. One of the soldiers later testified that they had cut the Iraqis loose and let them run before shooting them, to make the incident look like an escape attempt. A third soldier was also subsequently involved by carrying out a "mercy killing". The third soldier later made an arrangement with the government to plead guilty to a reduced charge of aggravated assault. A team of civilian and military lawyers defended the two soldiers and their squad leader in Article 32 proceedings (military equivalent to a grand jury) in Tikrit, Iraq and Courts Martial proceedings in Fort Campbell, Kentucky. The third soldier was defended by two military lawyers in the same proceedings, but was considered to be separate from the other two soldiers. After eight months of legal battles, the third soldier who was subsequently involved agreed to testify against the other defendants. Facing mandatory life sentences, the two soldiers who carried out the executions entered plea deals that reduced their maximum sentence to 18 years, making them eligible for parole after 5½ years. According to his lawyers, the third soldier was "to be convicted of aggravated assault and to receive a nine-month prison sentence in exchange for his testifying against three other members of his squad."
