= Airborne & Special Operations Museum =

Museum in Fayetteville, North Carolina

U.S. Army Airborne & Special Operations Museum
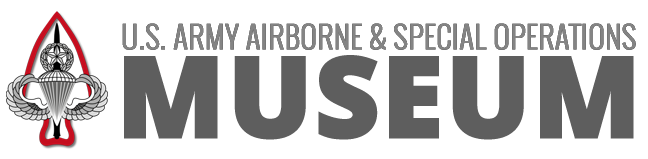
- Museum logo

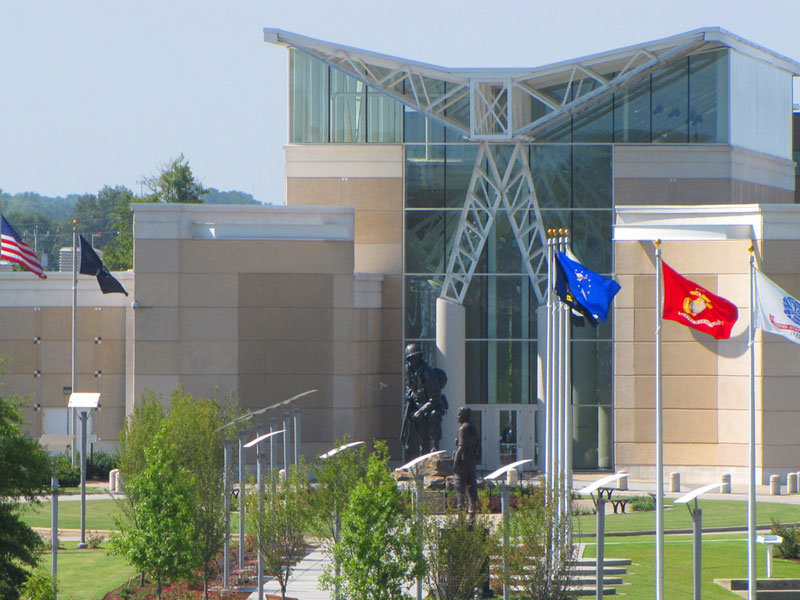

- Location within North Carolina Location within the United States
- Established: August 16, 2000; 25 years ago
- Location: 100 Bragg Boulevard; Fayetteville, North Carolina; United States
- Coordinates: 35.05565°N 78.88628°W
- Type: Military
- Key holdings: UH-60 Blackhawk rotor blade assembly from Super 61
- Director: James Bartlinski
- Owner: United States Army
- Public transit access: Fayetteville station, Amtrak (directly adjacent)
- Website: asomf.org

The United States Army Airborne & Special Operations Museum (ASOM) is part of the U.S. Army Museum Enterprise dedicated to preserving and teaching a public history of the Special Operations and Airborne community, as well as broader United States military history. Located on Fort Bragg, but geographically separate from the main installation, it has been open to the public in nearby downtown Fayetteville, North Carolina since 2000. The facility is staffed primarily by civilians and volunteers on a day-to-day basis, but remains owned and administered by the Army through the U.S. Army Center of Military History, a part of Training and Doctrine Command (TRADOC).

In October 2013 the ASOM opened the "Task Force Ranger and the Battle of Mogadishu Exhibit." The exhibit features immersive dioramas and artifacts from the battle including the wreckage of Super 6–1, the first Black Hawk helicopter shot down during the battle, and Super 6–4. The downing of Super 6-1 is widely considered to be a turning point in the battle and is chronicled in the book by Mark Bowden and movie Black Hawk Down produced by Ridley Scott.

In late 2016 the museum held an exhibit dedicated to the "Monuments Men", including artifacts, artwork and other items related to their work protecting artistic treasures during World War II.

== See also ==
- National Museum of the United States Army
- List of museums in the United States
- 82nd Airborne Division War Memorial Museum
