= Gary L. Harrell =

United States Army general (1951–2023)

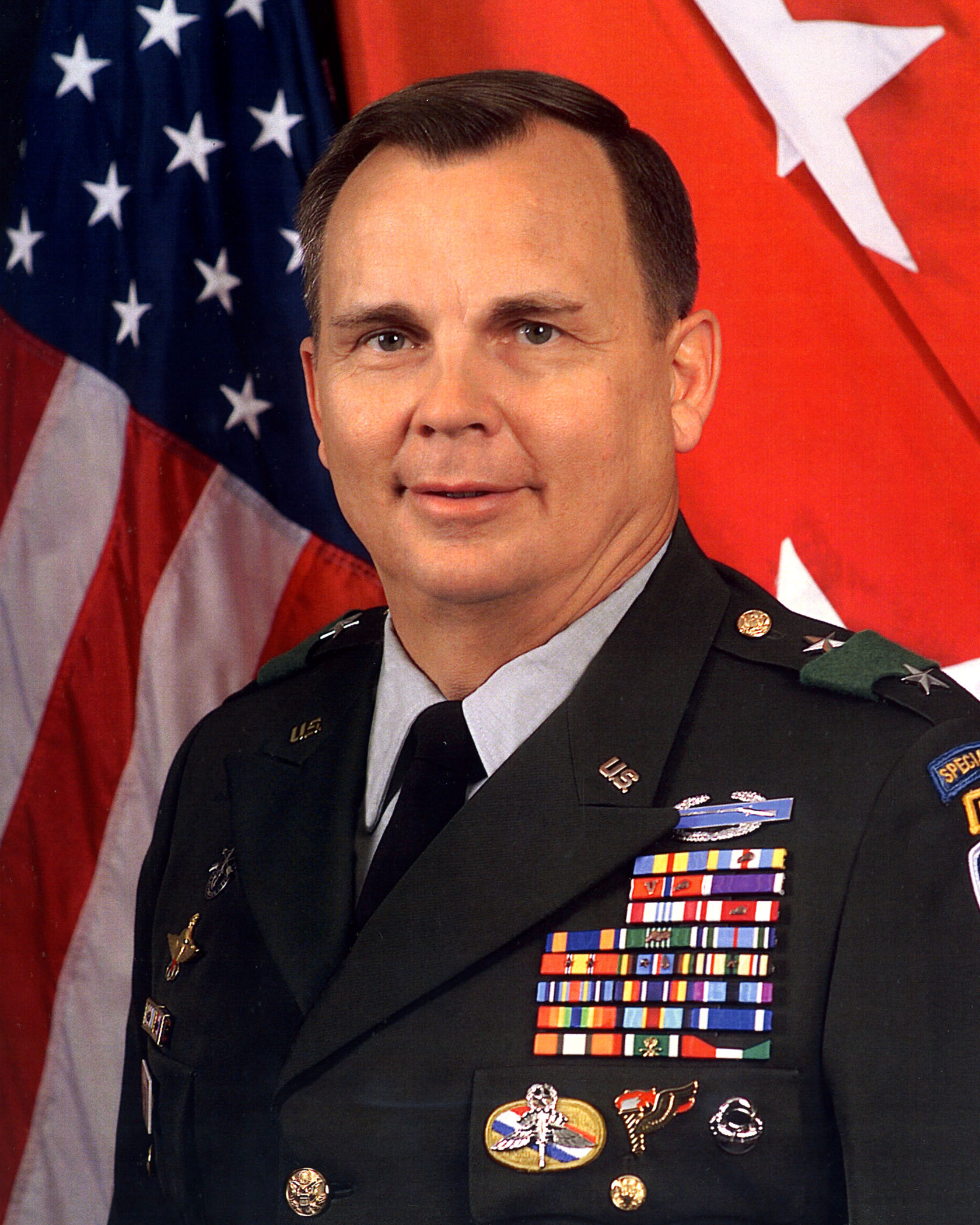
- Born: June 1, 1951; Jonesborough, Tennessee, U.S.
- Died: February 14, 2023 (aged 71); Johnson City, Tennessee, U.S.
- Military career
- Allegiance: United States
- Branch: United States Army
- Service years: 1973–2008
- Rank: Major general
- Commands: Special Operations Command Central; Special Forces Task Force Bowie; Delta Force
- Conflicts: Operation Urgent Fury; Operation Just Cause; Operation Acid Gambit; Gulf War; Operation Gothic Serpent; Battle of Mogadishu; Iraq War; War in Afghanistan
- Awards: Defense Distinguished Service Medal; Army Distinguished Service Medal; Defense Superior Service Medal (2); Bronze Star Medal (2); Purple Heart

Major General Gary Lynn Harrell (June 1, 1951 – February 14, 2023) was a United States Army general. He participated in numerous combat operations including Operation Just Cause in 1989, the Battle of Mogadishu in 1993, and the wars in Iraq and Afghanistan.

== Military career ==
Harrell earned his commission as an Infantry officer through East Tennessee State University's Army ROTC program in 1973 and was assigned to the 2nd Battalion, 508th Infantry Regiment, 82nd Airborne Division, as a rifle platoon leader and as an anti-tank platoon leader. In 1977, after completing the Special Forces Qualification Course, he was assigned to the 7th Special Forces Group. In 1980 Harrell served as a company commander in the 1st Battalion, 505th Infantry Regiment, 82nd Airborne Division. Harrell participated in the invasion of Grenada and afterwards served with the 10th Special Forces Group. In 1985 Harrell volunteered for and completed a specialized selection and operator training course for assignment to the Army's 1st Special Forces Operational Detachment – Delta, publicly known as Delta Force, at Fort Bragg. He served at this unit as Troop Commander and participated in Operation Just Cause. Later on Harrell was assigned to the Joint Special Operations Command as operations officer and participated in Operations Desert Shield and Desert Storm.

In 1992, Harrell returned to Fort Bragg and took command of C Squadron of Delta Force and participated in combat operations during Operation Gothic Serpent including the Battle of Mogadishu. In October 1993 he was severely wounded by enemy mortar fire. After graduating from the United States Army War College, Carlisle Barracks, Pennsylvania, in June 1995, Harrell was assigned as the Deputy Commander of Delta Force and commanded the unit from July 1998 to July 2000. Afterwards he was appointed the Director, Joint Security Directorate, United States Central Command from 2000 to 2002. During the War in Afghanistan, he commanded Special Forces Task Force Bowie and was the Assistant Division Commander for the 10th Mountain Division during Operation Anaconda. From 2003 to 2005 Harrell was assigned as commanding general, Special Operations Command Central. During Operation Iraqi Freedom, Harrell commanded special operations forces that were responsible for combat operations to prevent Scud missiles from being launched from Western Iraq and for stability operations in Northern Iraq. He last served as the Deputy Commanding General of the Army Special Operations Command. He retired in 2008.

== Death ==
Harrell died from glioblastoma on February 14, 2023, at the age of 71.

== Awards and decorations ==
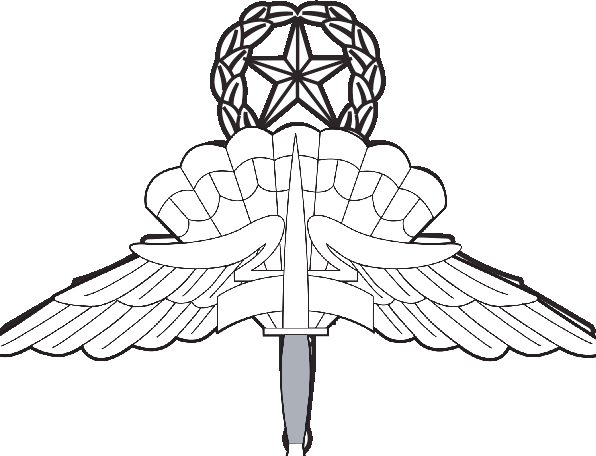
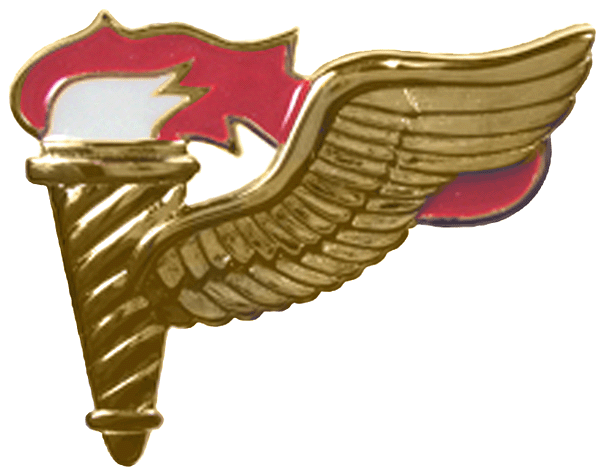
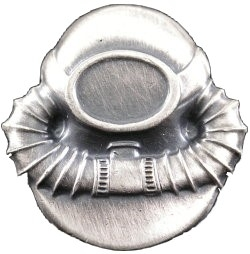
Combat Infantryman Badge
Master Parachutist Badge with one Combat Jump Device
Military Freefall Jumpmaster Badge with Special Operations Command Central background trimming
Pathfinder Badge
Scuba Diver Insignia
Canadian Jump Wings (non-operational)
Special Forces Tab
Ranger tab
United States Army Special Operations Command Combat Service Identification Badge
Special Forces Distinctive Unit Insignia
Overseas Service Bars

Defense Distinguished Service Medal
Army Distinguished Service Medal
Defense Superior Service Medal with one bronze oak leaf cluster
Bronze Star Medal with Valor device and oak leaf cluster
Purple Heart
Defense Meritorious Service Medal
Meritorious Service Medal with oak leaf cluster
Air Medal
Army Commendation Medal with two oak leaf clusters
Joint Service Achievement Medal
Joint Meritorious Unit Award with oak leaf cluster
Valorous Unit Award with oak leaf cluster
National Defense Service Medal with two bronze service stars
Armed Forces Expeditionary Medal with Arrowhead device and service star
Southwest Asia Service Medal with service star
Global War on Terrorism Expeditionary Medal
Global War on Terrorism Service Medal
Humanitarian Service Medal
Army Service Ribbon
Army Overseas Service Ribbon
NATO Medal for the former Yugoslavia
Multinational Force and Observers Medal
Kuwait Liberation Medal (Saudi Arabia)
Kuwait Liberation Medal (Kuwait)

== Sources ==
- Boykin, William G., and Lynn Vincent. Never Surrender: a Soldier's Journey to the Crossroads of Faith and Freedom. Faith Words, 2011. ISBN 978-0446583220
- Tucker, Spencer. The Encyclopedia of Middle East Wars: the United States in the Persian Gulf, Afghanistan, and Iraq Conflicts. ABC-CLIO, 2010. ISBN 978-1851099474
