= Military-age male =

American propaganda term

Military-age male (abbreviated as "MAM," plural "MAMs") is a term used to refer to men at ages where they are generally capable of military service. Typically used to describe males in the age range of 16-45, sometimes including men up to 60 years old.

== History ==
=== Usage in genocide ===
A concerted effort was made by the Bosnian Serb Army of Republika Srpska to capture and execute all Bosniak men of military age in the Srebrenica massacre.

=== American usage ===
American usage of the term began during the Vietnam War, when the American public and American military-industrial complex used the term to better redefine whom was a threat towards military action and response."

==== Usage in post-9/11 wars ====
This term was commonly used in the Bush-era wars around the world and later in Obama- and Trump-era drone programs.

==== Usage in immigration rhetoric ====
The term has also been used by the Republican Party against migrants crossing the Mexico–United States border.

== Impact ==
The usage of the term has been criticized as a propaganda effort intended to avert public criticism from the US Department of Defense, and for obfuscating and preventing proper oversight of US defense and foreign policies.
