= William F. Garrison =

United States Army general (born 1944)

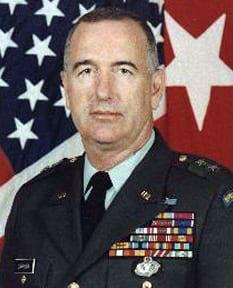
- Born: 27 June 1944 (age 82); Mineral Wells, Texas
- Military career
- Allegiance: United States
- Branch: United States Army
- Service years: 1966–1996
- Rank: Major general
- Nickname: "Bill"
- Commands: John F. Kennedy Special Warfare Center (1995–96); Joint Special Operations Command (1992–94); Delta Force (1985–89); 1st Battalion, 505th Infantry Regiment (1981–83)
- Conflicts: See battles: Vietnam War; Phoenix Program; Somali Civil War; United Nations Operation in Somalia II; Operation Gothic Serpent; Battle of Mogadishu
- Awards: Defense Distinguished Service Medal; Legion of Merit; Bronze Star Medal (5) "V"; Purple Heart; Defense Superior Service Medal; Meritorious Service Medal (3); Air Medal; Army Commendation Medal (3)

William F. Garrison (born 27 June 1944) is a retired American major general who commanded the United States forces during Operation Gothic Serpent, the military operation launched during the Somali Civil War in 1993 to capture Somali warlord Mohamed Farrah Aidid.

== Early life and education ==
Garrison was born in Mineral Wells, Texas, on 27 June 1944. He earned his bachelor of business administration degree from University of Texas–Pan American. Garrison enlisted in the United States Army in 1966.

== Military career ==
He attended Army Officer Candidate School, graduating in June 1967 and was commissioned as a second lieutenant in the Infantry Branch. During the Vietnam War, Garrison participated in the Phoenix Program. According to Mark Bowden, Garrison "had served two tours in Vietnam, part of it helping to run the infamously brutal Phoenix Program, which ferreted out and killed Viet Cong village leaders."

From 1981 to 1983, Garrison commanded the 1st Battalion, 505th Infantry, 82d Airborne Division, at Fort Bragg. In 1982, he led the 808-man Task Force 1/505, on the first six-month Sinai mission as part of the Multinational Force and Observers, serving as a buffer between Israel and Egypt, and was present when Israel handed over the Sinai to Egypt. Garrison spent most of his career in special operations units, including the Intelligence Support Activity as the commander of its operations squadron and the 1st Special Forces Operational Detachment-Delta (also known as Delta Force) from 1985 to 1989. His last command was the John F. Kennedy Special Warfare Center.

=== Operation Gothic Serpent ===
Garrison commanded Task Force Ranger during Operation Gothic Serpent in Somalia, a military operation conducted in Mogadishu, Somalia, by an American-led coalition during the Somali Civil War in 1993. The primary objective of the operation was to capture Somali military officer Mohamed Farrah Aidid, who was wanted by the Unified Task Force after his attacks against United Nations troops in 1992. The operation took place from August to October 1993 and was supervised by the United States' Joint Special Operations Command.

The mission culminated in what became known as the 1993 Battle of Mogadishu. Garrison took full responsibility for the tactical setbacks experienced in Operation Gothic Serpent, which effectively ended his military career.

Mark Bowden, the author of Black Hawk Down: A Story of Modern War, described Garrison as a military ascetic. According to Bowden's description, Garrison tirelessly worked to serve his country and would do anything for his soldiers. Some of Garrison's subordinates have also spoken publicly about their former commander. Staff Sergeant Dan Schilling, an Air Force combat controller, who took part in Operation Gothic Serpent, shared his feelings about Garrison in the book:

I should pause here for a moment to say a few words about General Garrison. Many know his record and command history. I'm not the person to expound on his exploits; in fact I don't know the man very well. But I will say he is the finest general officer I have ever worked for and probably ever will. He understood his men and how we thought, what we wanted and needed, and understood the situation anywhere he was, immediately and completely. He is the finest leader an operator could ask for. It was a shame that his career was derailed after our deployment; it was a criminal act committed by political cowards.

— Dan Schilling, The Battle of Mogadishu: Firsthand Accounts From The Men of Task Force Ranger, Page 187

By September 1996, Garrison had retired at the rank of major general and settled into a ranch near the community of Hico, Texas.

=== Military awards ===
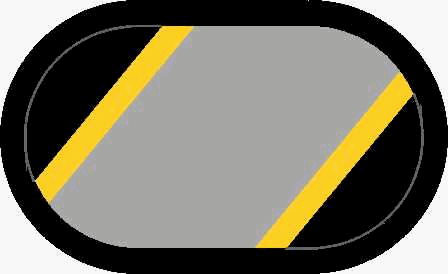

Combat Infantryman Badge
	Defense Distinguished Service Medal	Legion of Merit	Bronze Star Medal with Valor device and four oak leaf clusters
Purple Heart	Defense Meritorious Service Medal	Meritorious Service Medal with two oak leaf clusters	Air Medal
Army Commendation Medal with two oak leaf clusters	Army Good Conduct Medal	National Defense Service Medal with one bronze service star	Armed Forces Expeditionary Medal
Vietnam Service Medal with four bronze service stars	Humanitarian Service Medal	Army Service Ribbon	Army Overseas Service Ribbon
Republic of Vietnam (RVN) Gallantry Cross with Gold Star	Republic of Vietnam (RVN) Staff Service Medal, 1st Class	Multinational Force and Observers Medal	Republic of Vietnam (RVN) Campaign Medal
Special Forces Tab		Master Parachutist Badge with JFKSWC background trimming	

== In popular culture ==
- Garrison is portrayed by Sam Shepard in the film Black Hawk Down, which was based on the events of the Battle of Mogadishu.
