= Bloody Monday raid =

United States military operation

Bloody Monday raid (Operation Michigan)
- Part of the United Nations Operation in Somalia II
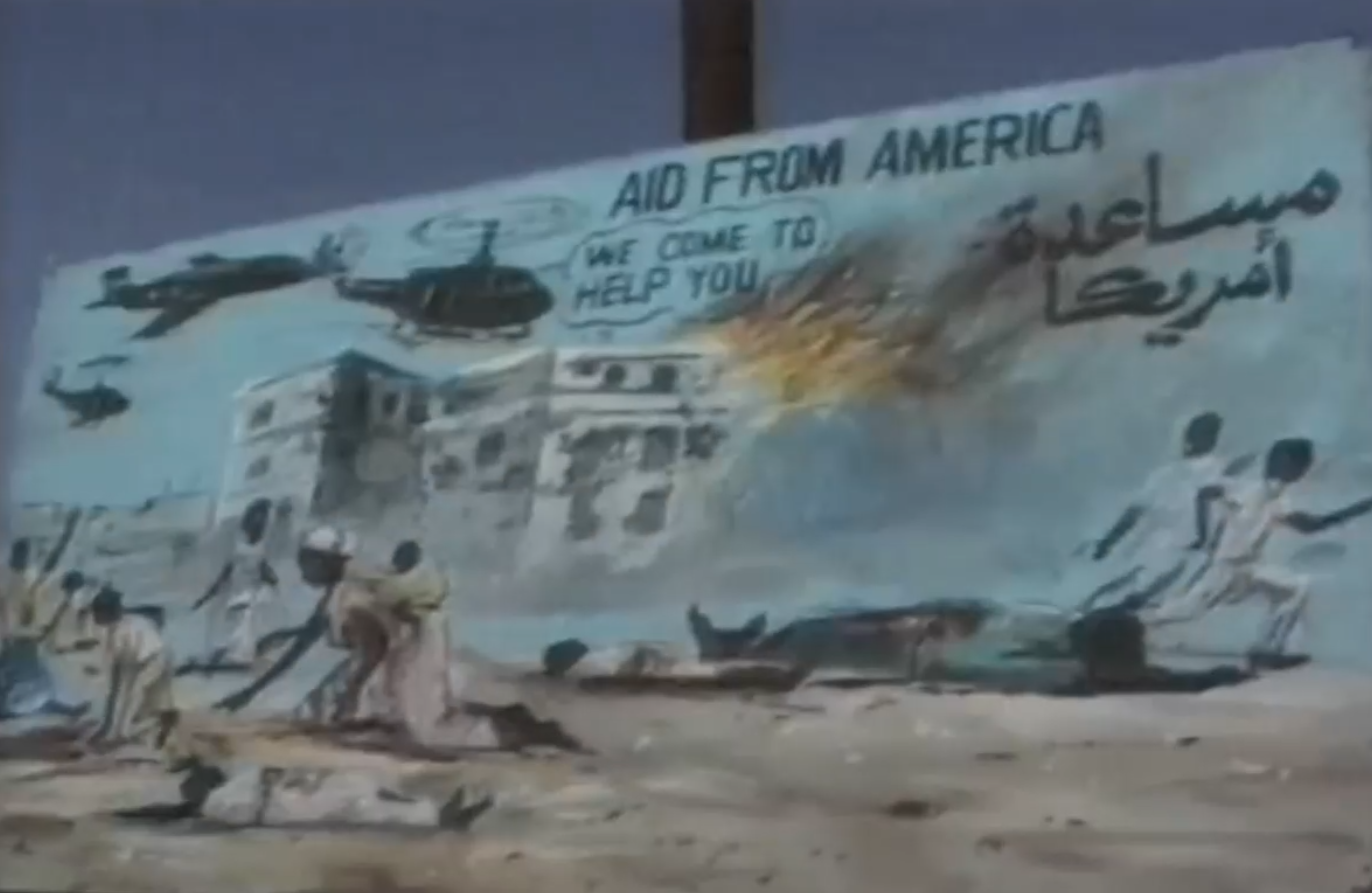
- Sign at anti-UNOSOM protest in Mogadishu depicting 'Bloody Monday'
- Type: Air strike and air assault
- Location: Hodan District, Mogadishu, Somalia
- Commanded by: Thomas M. Montgomery
- Objective: Kill or capture of SNA leadership
- Date: July 12, 1993; 10:18am – 10:35 (UTC+03:00)
- Executed by: 1st Bn, 22nd Infantry and 41st Bn Engineer of 10th Mountain Division, on behalf of UNOSOM II
- Outcome: Significant casualties among Habar Gidir and other Somali National Alliance affiliated clans, leading to increased popular support for Aidid; Heightened anti-UN sentiment and escalated attacks on UNOSOM forces; Widespread international condemnation of the raid; Increased apprehension among UNOSOM II coalition members about the raid's provocative nature
- Casualties: UN forces casualties - none Somali casualties: UNOSOM II claim - 7 to 20 killed (All male combatants); Red Cross claim - 215 casualties, including 54 killed; Habar Gidir and SNA claim - 273 casualties, including 73 killed (women and children among deceased); Foreign journalists - 4 murdered by mob after the raid

The Bloody Monday raid (Somali: Isniintii Dhiiga; Arabic: الإثنين الدامي), also known as the Abdi House raid or Operation Michigan, was a US military operation that took place in Mogadishu on 12 July 1993, during the United Nations Operation in Somalia II (UNOSOM II) phase of the UN intervention in the Somali Civil War. Carried out by American QRF troops on behalf of UNOSOM II, the raid was the war's deadliest incident in Mogadishu to that point and a turning point in the UN operation. It inflamed anti-UN and anti-American sentiments among Somalis, galvanizing the insurgency that the US military faced during the Battle of Mogadishu three months later.

As part of the hunt for General Mohammed Farah Aidid after the attack on Pakistani peacekeepers on 5 June 1993, U.S. forces conducted a 17-minute raid on a villa owned by Aidid's Interior Minister, Abdi "Qeybdiid" Awale. The villa was hosting a gathering attended by high-ranking elders of the Habar Gidir and other major subclans, along with prominent members of the Aidid-led Somali National Alliance (SNA).

UNOSOM II officials claimed that the gathering was a war council composed of hardliners taking place at an SNA command center, making it a legitimate military target, but never produced evidence to justify its claims. In contrast, Somali accounts of the raid maintain that the meeting was a peace conference in which eminent elders, SNA moderates, and civilians convened to discuss a proposed diplomatic resolution to the escalating conflict between the SNA and UNOSOM II.

The raid was one of the most pivotal events during UNOSOM II, as it had a serious adverse effect on the relationship between foreign troops and the Somali people, while alarming numerous UNOSOM troop-contributing nations, some of which withdrew from military operations. The 12 July operation was heavily criticized by UNOSOM II's own Justice Division, Doctors Without Borders, Human Rights Watch, Amnesty International, and the Organization of African Unity.

== Background ==
The day immediately following the 5 June 1993 attack on Pakistani forces, the UN Security Council passed Resolution 837, calling for the arrest of those responsible for the death of the peacekeepers. Though General Mohammed Farah Aidid was not directly named in Resolution 837, his political organization, the Somali National Alliance was blamed; subsequent investigation concluded that the SNA was most likely behind the attack.

This marked the beginning of a new phase of escalating tit for tat violence that began with retaliatory AC-130 strikes on SNA sites and attempts to capture Aidid. These were met with response ambushes, mortar attacks, and assassinations of Somali UNOSOM II employees by the SNA. But UNOSOM efforts to capture Aidid in the month following the passing of Resolution 837 would repeatedly end in failure.

=== UN planning ===
The planned surprise attack was both unique and historic, in that it was the first attack where the target would be Somalis instead of weapon caches or other structures and is referred to by Washington Post reporter Keith B. Richburg as, "the UN's first ever officially authorized assassination".

Abdi "Qeybdiid" Awale's residence, a villa in the Hodan district of southern Mogadishu, was well known to have been holding regular clan meetings for the Habar Gidir and became a target, as Qeybdiid was a high ranking member of the SNA, and the organization was composed in large part of members from the Habar Gidir. In the days and weeks following the commencement of military operations, UNOSOM had (via radio broadcast and propaganda leaflets dropped over Mogadishu) made the clear distinction that it was not the enemy of the Habar Gidir clan, but only wanted to capture Aidid. Following the raid, in late July Under Secretary for Political Affairs Peter Tarnoff reiterated in a statement before a U.S. Senate committee that UNOSOM had no dispute with Habar Gidir and that the clan would remain in negotiations on political reconciliation.

Detailed planning for a strike on a future gathering at Abdi Qeybdiid Awale's villa began on July 7, 1993. Turkish commander of UNOSOM II forces, General Çevik Bir had privately declared on July 9, 1993, "I will kill Aidid within four days." UNOSOM command considered the planned assault as a legitimate defensive action that would weaken Aidid's influence within the Habar Gidir clan. They were also concerned about the possibility of the Italian contingent secretly negotiating a unilateral agreement with Aidid, which could inadvertently bolster his popular support.

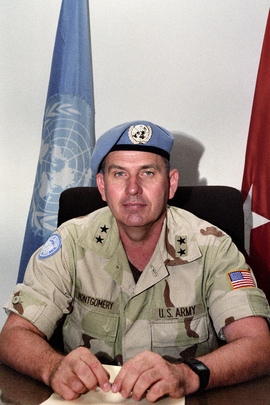
US Army officer Major General Thomas M. Montgomery, commander of the 12 July 1993 raid

Unlike in previous raids, Çevik Bir, his deputy US Lieutenant General Thomas M. Montgomery, and other coalition military leaders decided, after weeks of agonizing, not to issue any warnings prior to the attack. The purpose of this was twofold: first it would, in theory, enable them to fully decapitate the leadership of the SNA; second, it would reduce the risk of friendly casualties. The first reason was pragmatic in nature and based on past experiences where cordons had failed and key SNA targets had slipped away. The second reason was partly pragmatic and partly political. As head of UNOSOM II, retired US Adm Johnathan Howe could have overruled the military, but chose not to as heavier casualties sustained from recent firefights, partly due to the SNA's deliberate use of human shields to test the UN peacekeepers' rules of engagement, had made the force's commanders wary and lowered the bar for acceptable risk to civilians during military operations. Sebastian Kaempf, a Senior Lecturer at the University of Queensland's Political Science department, argued that by not issuing a warning, UNOSOM II leadership had concluded that military necessity and the perceived risk of US casualties had overruled concerns for Somali civilians.

The White House directly signed off on permission for the operation, but it is disputed if President Clinton knew if Somalis were being directly targeted when he did. The raid was directed by the deputy commander of UNOSOM II, Lt. Gen. Montgomery, who was overhead in a helicopter during in the strike.

=== The 12 July 1993 conference ===
Gen. Mohammed Farah Aidid served as the nominal leader of the Somali National Alliance, but his ability to make decisions for the organization was limited. A council of elders held decision-making power for most significant issues, and elections were held that threatened his leadership. The elder councils moved forward via consensus decision-making after a period of extensive deliberations and discussion.

On July 9, 1993, a handful of prominent Somalis, including Sheikh Haji Mohamed Iman Aden, the most senior member of the Habar Gidir clan, and former Deputy Prime Minister Abdiqasim Salad Hassan, met with US Admiral Johnathan Howe, the special representative of the UN Secretary-General in Somalia. Howe had requested that they search for a peaceful resolution to the ongoing war between the SNA and UNOSOM II. UNOSOM considered Sheikh Haji Mohamed Iman Aden a moderate alternative to Aidid. Under the mounting pressure of the UNOSOM hunt, six representatives of the different sub clans within the SNA met and agreed to enter into a political dialogue with UNOSOM on 11 July 1993. At the meeting, headed by Abdiqasim Salad Hassan (later President of Somalia in 2000), a decision was also made to completely untangle the Habar Gidir clan from politics and leave political national issues to the SNA. It was also agreed that a twenty-five member Supreme Council would be created in order to keep the clan united and an election for it was scheduled to take place on July 15, 1993.

Howe's request for dialogue and the need to explain the developments of Abdiqasim Salad's 11 July 1993 meeting to the other members of the Habar Gidir, prompted the unusually high profile Monday 12 July 1993, gathering. Aidid reportedly disapproved of the meeting taking place, as his authority in both the SNA and Habar Gidir was now being held in serious question. According to Black Hawk Down author Mark Bowden: "...[a]ll leaders and elders of Habr Gidr clan [were present], most of whom were opposed to the military posture that Aideed was taking against the UN. The meeting was about forcing Aideed to comply with UNOSOM II". In an interview with journalists, Abdi Qeybdiid remarked on the conference: "Everybody was interested in stopping the fighting, to open a dialogue. It was in the interest of all." The conference to discuss Howe's peace initiative included high-ranking elders, intellectuals, businessmen, former judges, military officers, representatives of women's organizations, and other notable clansmen of the Habar Gidir clan. Representatives and notable figures of other Somali clans were present such as the:

- Gaalje'el and Sheikhal
- Rahanweyn and Dir
- Ogaden and Majerteen; Darod sub clans
- Hawadle and Murosade; Hawiye sub clans

Abdi Qeybdiid's villa was selected for the talks, as it possessed a large carpeted conference room on the second floor capable of holding a gathering of over a hundred people. The meeting had been publicized in Mogadishu's newspapers as a peace conference the day before and an American war correspondent in Mogadishu who was a witness of the raid, Scott Peterson, corroborated the Somali account that a group of elders had gathered to discuss to how to end the violence between the SNA and UN forces.

A CIA informant inside the clan passed intelligence that a meeting was to take place and that present among the gathered would be some of those who had part taken in the June 5, 1993, attack. Aidid was allegedly tipped off that something would happen to the conference a few hours prior, by his own intelligence network or by the Italian element of UNOSOM II, who were allegedly sympathetic to him.

== Attack ==
On the morning of July 12, 1993, Operation Michigan was commenced by the 10th Mountain Division and Task Force Safari air units of the American Quick Reaction Force (QRF) in Mogadishu under the provisions of UN Resolution 837. For at least a week before the raid, US Army Special Forces had staked out the compound, surveilling Aidid and other members of the SNA come and go. The QRF had been on standby for the past few days and was prepared to launch the operation on just a five minutes notice.

Earlier that morning, the US State Department issued a warning that the CIA had received a memo revealing a plan by the SNA to launch a large scale attack on United Nations officials in Mogadishu, possibly giving American commanders a plausible reason to launch the assault. In the aftermath of the raid, it was discovered that the CIA report had been incorrect.

=== Air strike phase ===
Following confirmation of the codeword Michigan, an armada of 17 helicopters took off from Mogadishu International Airport and surrounded the villa within minutes.

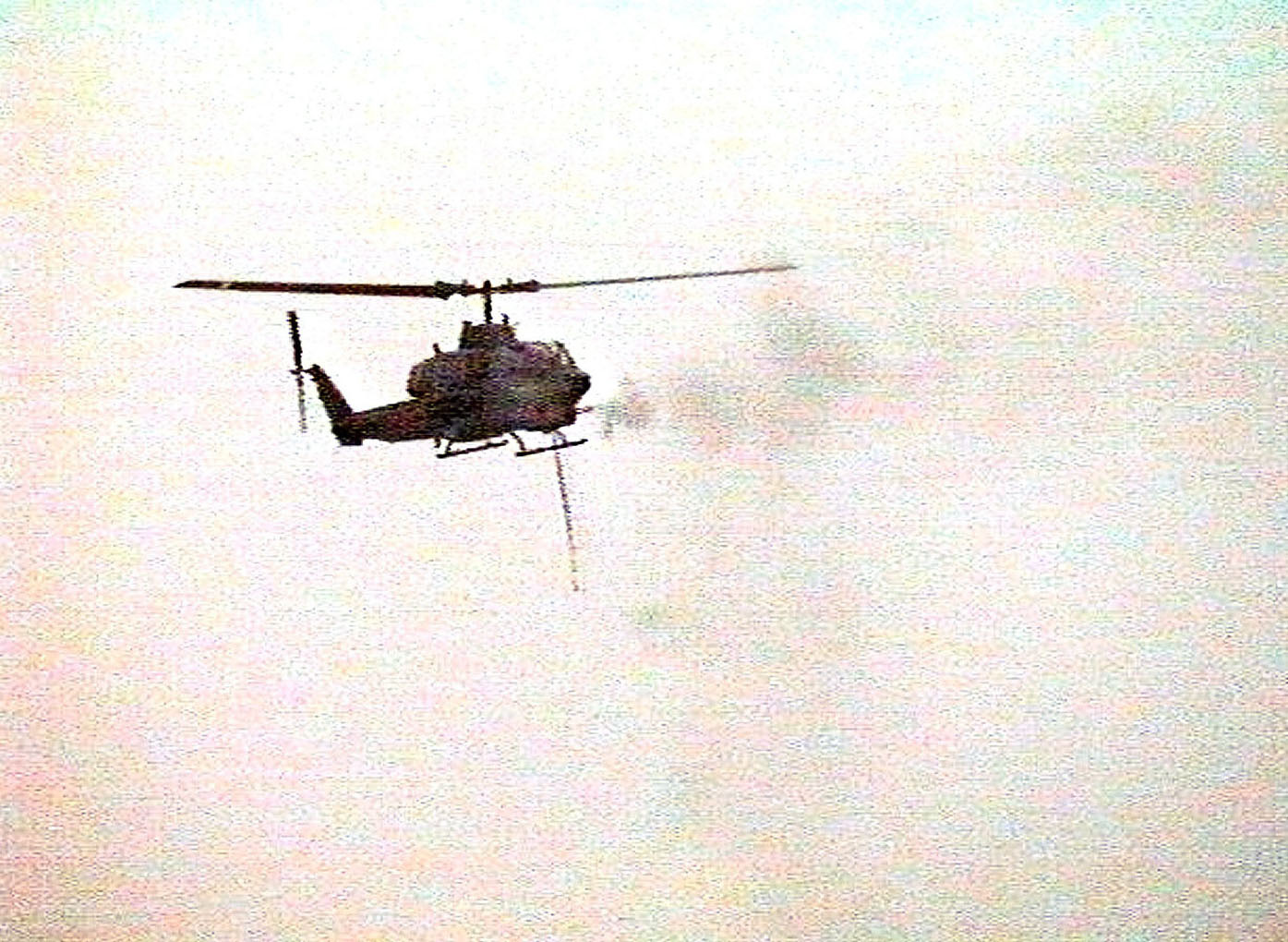
American AH-1 Cobra firing its 20 mm cannon over Mogadishu

Around 10:18 ^{am} a CIA informant walked out of the meeting to the main gate of the compound, in full view of the waiting attack helicopters that had just begun encircling the villa, wearing an arranged set of clothing as a signal to begin the attack. Seconds later, following visual confirmation of the signal and without any warning, six AH-1 Cobras and four OH-58 Kiowas launched a total of sixteen TOW missiles and 2,200 rounds of 20 mm caliber cannon fire into the building for a total of six to eight minutes.

The AH-1 Cobras launched the TOWs into the second floor of the villa where the conference was taking place, then specifically targeted the building's stairwells to block any escape routes and finally aimed for the roof in an attempt to crush the occupants.

"Our orders were to destroy the conference room on the second floor where everybody was supposed to be meeting, then we were to destroy the staircase in the back of the house so no one could get away...I was flying security for battle position one and my job was to wax anybody if they tried to leave the compound, or if they came outside and tried to shoot at us. Then I was supposed to destroy the front gate of the compound so that the infantry could get in". Chief Warrant Officer Christopher Roben

Moments before the TOWs hit the villa, Abdi Qeybdiid had just begun addressing the crowd of approximately 80 to 100 Somalis that had gathered. Present among them were prominent sheikhs, former judges, famous poets, professors, engineers, military officers, representatives of women's organizations and intellectuals who represented the most respected and best-educated of the Habar Gidir clan. The first TOW broke through the second story wall, flew past Qeybdiid's face and exploded. A survivor recounted that the first missile had torn a hole in the wall and revealed the mass of encircling helicopters that appeared to be almost at eye level over the city. The Habar Gidir's most senior elder, Sheik Haji Mohamed Iman Aden, who was over 90 years old, was instantly killed in the first TOW missile volley along with other elders, as they were all directly sitting against the walls of the conference room.

What Farah saw and heard was a flash of light and a violent crack. He stood and took one step forward and heard the whooosh! of a second missile. There was another flash and explosion. He was thrown to the floor. Thick smoke filled the room. He tried to move forward but his way was blocked by bodies, a bloody pile of men and parts of men a meter high...Those who survived the first blast were feeling along the wall, groping for the door when the second missile had exploded. The air was thick with dark smoke and smelled of powder, blood, and burned flesh. Farah found the stairs, stood, and had taken one step down when a third missile exploded, disintegrating [sic] the staircase. He tumbled to the first floor. He sat up stunned, and felt himself for broken bones and wet spots...There was another explosion above him. Then another and another.

Those who escaped the initial attack had to jump from the second story of the building onto the ground. Collateral damage occurred when a single TOW missile and multiple 20 mm rounds missed the villa and struck near the French Embassy. Also among those killed were civilians who were not directly participating in the conference such as multiple women who had been serving tea for gathering, children who had happened to be playing in the villa's courtyard, and nearby pedestrians who had been hit by stray 20mm rounds.

Aidid was not present at the meeting.

=== Ground assault phase ===
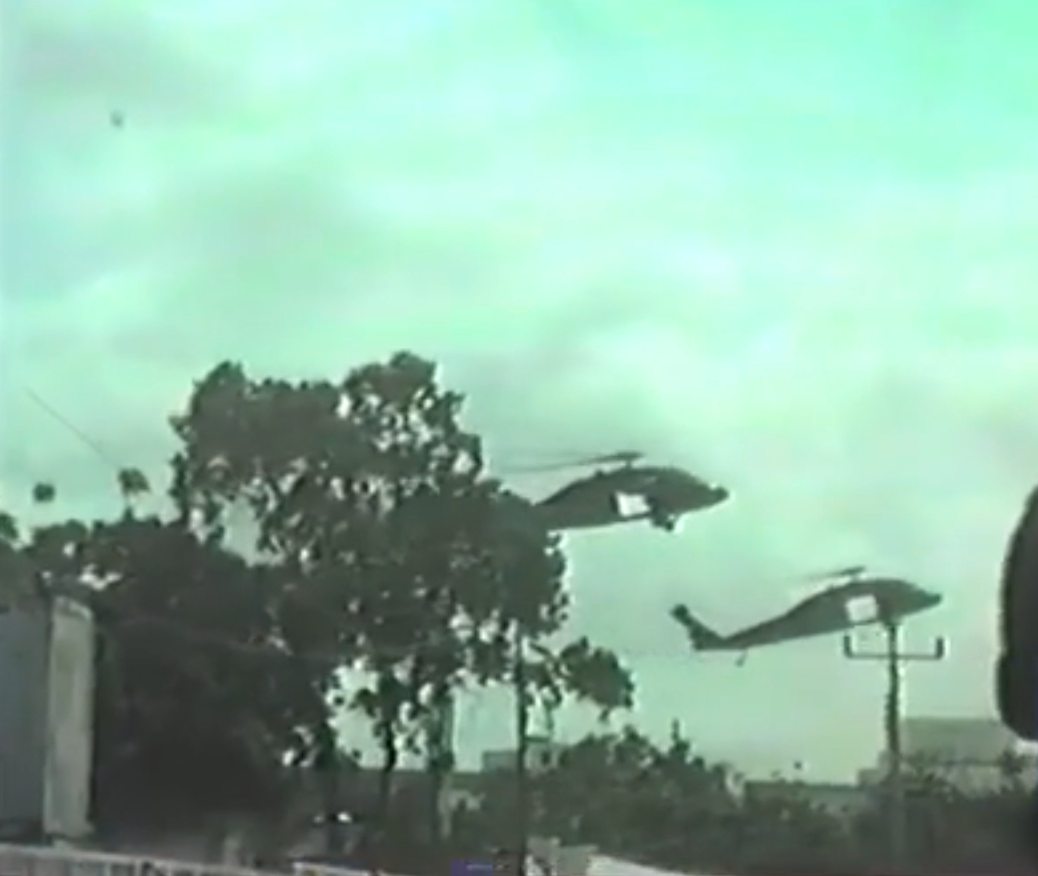
Two UH-60 Black Hawks moments away from landing on the street outside the villa and deploying the Assault Platoon on 12 July 1993

At 10:23am, one minute after the Cobras had stopped their assault on the villa, three of the waiting Black Hawk helicopters, carrying 53 men, landed in the vicinity of the decimated building.

One of the Black Hawks, containing the support platoon tasked with covering the assault platoon, landed on the roof of the nearby French Embassy, which provided a vantage point over the villa. The two other Black Hawks, landed on the street in front of the meeting and troops from them quickly streamed out and set up a cordon around the house. Helicopters participating in the raid dropped a total of 22 CS gas grenades to chase away gathering crowds of onlookers.

According to a primary participant in the raid, the assault platoon then made its way from the street into the compound and into the house to search for surviving "SNA leadership" and any valuable intelligence. According to an American soldier who claims to have been present in one of the patrolling Black Hawks during the raid, after entering the building US soldiers radioed that the raid was not effective and that the targets from the asset list were not present. Hussein Sanjeeh, a survivor of the airstrike, provided an eyewitness account stating that American troops stormed the property, killing 15 survivors with pistol shots to the head as they shouted while sweeping through the villa. This account was firmly denied by American commanders. One helicopter pilot reported that the troops on the ground had engaged in sporadic gunfights with some of the survivors; the operation was filmed from one of the helicopters but was not released. A Reuters correspondent who witnessed the ground assault claimed to have heard heavy automatic fire coming from inside the compound. Before departing, U.S. sappers from Charlie Company, 41st Engineer Battalion, moved through the compound, identifying targets and destroying them with thermite grenades. They left on the last departing helicopter, with one survivor of the attack captive. In total, only two survivors were taken prisoner.

The UN account, detailed in the Blue Book, claims that it took nine minutes for troops to clear the area, search the villa, and depart, all while leaving earlier than expected, marking the Abdi House raid as the fastest operation that had been conducted by UNOSOM II. The total time of the raid, from the first TOW hitting the villa to the last soldier departing on the Black Hawks, was about 17 minutes according to UN spokesman Lt. Col. David Haynes.

=== Killing of foreign journalists ===
In response to the attack, multiple foreign journalists travelled to the site to gather information and provide coverage. Several went with SNA escorts who had insisted that the journalists see the carnage unhindered so they could tell the world. On arriving at the site, the enraged mob that had gathered turned on the journalists; five were enveloped by the crowd and separated from their colleagues and the escorts who, sensing the danger, evacuated the remaining journalists from the area. Of the five journalists, four were shot, stabbed, and bludgeoned to death while the fifth was able to escape despite multiple gunshot wounds. The fourth, Dan Eldon, was able to momentarily break away from the mob and ran. A Black Hawk from the American QRF spotted him but was allegedly ordered to stand down and not intervene, possibly due to the rules of engagement which prevented engagement unless they or other UN individuals were directly threatened.

Eldon's body was later recovered by a Black Hawk. The bodies of the other three journalists were mutilated and dumped in the Bakaara Market, however, armed gunmen prevented their recovery. Reuters and Associated Press personnel hired their own security to retrieve the other three bodies as the UN reportedly refused to lend aid for this. The hired fighters fought the gunmen, allowing the deceased's bodies to be recovered. A significant amount of the international press on the incident was primarily focused on the deaths of the four journalists—Dan Eldon, Hos Maina, Hansi Kraus, and Anthony Macharia–with less attention paid to the UN attack that had preceded it.

Because of the killings, most western news organizations completely withdrew from Somalia which greatly contributed to the lack of any substantial press during the Battle of Mogadishu on 3–4 October 1993. By 17 July 1993, The New York Times, The Washington Post, Los Angeles Times, ABC News, and NBC News had all withdrawn their correspondents from Somalia.

== Casualties ==
UNOSOM commanders initially claimed that only 7 Somalis had been killed, all men and all combatants. This number was later revised to 13 and then 20 as the body count rose at Bandair Hospital through the remainder of the day. Scott Peterson, who was present on the scene of the attack, claims that the raid was far deadlier than US and UN officials acknowledged.

According to the International Committee of the Red Cross, there were 54 Somalis killed and 161 wounded, though this was based on a survey of the dead and injured at two large hospitals in Mogadishu. According to Washington Post correspondent Keith Richburg, the actual casualty count was possibly higher as only two medical facilities in the entire city were canvassed, and since many Somalis follow the Islamic tradition of burying the dead immediately. Africa Rights Watch asserted the evidence pointed to a death toll exceeding 54.

Somali witness and SNA accounts of the attack claimed 73 people, who could be named, were killed and 200 were wounded, which UNOSOM officials denied. Italian press reports reported 70 deaths, while Irish press reported up to 80. Mark Bowden noted that every eyewitness he interviewed placed the number of dead at 70 or more and that former ambassador and U.S. special envoy to Somalia Robert B. Oakley accepted this figure. Many of those killed in the strike were vocal supporters of reconciliation and negotiations with UNOSOM.

In his research for Black Hawk Down, Bowden discovered that numerous interviewees, encompassing non-Somali aid workers, asserted that many of those killed in the attack were well-respected Habar Gidir moderates who had opposed Aidid. Doctors Without Borders claimed that one of their high ranking Somali administrators for the city of Merca had been participating in the meeting and was killed. According to Mark Bradbury, "The killing of these people prevented an early resolution to the conflict." Several of the notable figures killed were:

- Sheikh Haji Mohamed Iman Aden, most senior elder of the Habar Gidir
- Moallim Soyan, highly regarded poet and elder
- Sheikh Hassan Abdi Naleye, Habar Gidir Sheikh
- Dr. Abdirahman Hassan Elmi, lecturer at Somali National University
- Dr. Khalife Adawe Ali, former Jurist and intellectual from the Hawadle clan
- Abshir Qahir Farah, Habar Gidir elder
- Osman Hassan Kulimye, Hawadle elder

According to historian and Somali expert John Drysdale (who lost a close Somali friend in the attack) the majority of those killed were crushed by falling rubble as the villa was blown apart. Drysdale, while serving as an advisor to UNOSOM II at the time of raid, noted that it would have been impossible for American troops to have been able to get a proper count of the dead and injured as they were incapable of reaching the second floor of the villa, where the meeting had been taking place, as the stairs had been totally destroyed in the minutes preceding the ground raid. CNN had received footage of the raid from a Somali cameraman showing the conference room covered in "shattered limbs protruding through the rubble", but it was deemed too disturbing and gruesome to show to the public on air. Reporter Keith Richburg noted that the video recorded of the attack showed women among the dead. Multiple children and numerous women had been killed in the missile strike, with one of the deceased confirmed to be pregnant. According to Somali journalist Abdulqadir Aroma, fourteen women (two pregnant) and ten children had been killed. Days later, UNOSOM dropped leaflets over Mogadishu proclaiming, "The SNA said women and children were killed, but that was pure propaganda."

Former National Security Adviser to the Clinton Administration in July 1993, Anthony Lake, remarked in a 1998 interview with Bowden, that the raid "was not specifically designed to kill people."

== Aftermath ==
=== UNOSOM II account ===
The reason for the meeting, how many people were killed and even the very inhabitants of the house at the time is disputed by UNOSOM officials who claimed that the conference was a gathering of an SNA war council at a major command and control center, and that the operation was a tactical success. Amnesty International directly disputed UNOSOM's assertion, stating that there was no evidence that the villa was either a command center or a legitimate military target. Human Rights Watch also criticized UNOSOM for producing little evidence to justify its claims.

According to the UN, the raid was carried out based on information that meetings would be held at the center and that the militia leaders would likely attend. UNOSOM officials further claimed that:

- No warning had been given to the occupants because the Abdi House was a purely military facility, and that no innocent civilians had been killed. UNOSOM forces further claimed all casualties were armed adult males.
- Maj. Leann Swieczkowski, an Army spokeswoman, said that the photographs taken inside the villa proved that it was an SNA command center, but also claimed that the evidence of Somali casualties had not been recorded because the UN military photographer's camera had broken.
- US Adm. Johnathan Howe claimed that there was no evidence of non-combatant casualties from the raid and that the attack had been conducted on a key terror cell. He additionally claimed that the footage recorded by the Somali cameraman was suspect.
- An after action report on Somalia prepared by Montgomery and others, claimed that among those killed were a number of top financiers and military planners, including the overall planner of the June 5th ambush of Pakistani soldiers. Montgomery acknowledged that some of the casualties were elders but stated that they were still considered militia combatants.

The exact target of the operation is disputed, as UN officials later claimed Aidid rarely attended the meetings and was not the target. Some of the American helicopter pilots involved in the raid claimed that Aidid had actually been the informant.

=== International reaction ===
Numerous relief agencies, human rights organizations and journalists in Somalia publicly decried the attack, and in Mogadishu UNOSOM II command was delivered copies of the Geneva Convention, specifically in relation to attacks on civilians and proportional retaliation. Human Rights Watch remarked that the attack "to the casual observer looked like mass murder." Rony Brauman, then president of Doctors Without Borders commented: "For the first time in Somalia there has been a killing under the flag of humanitarianism." In the view of Patrick Vial, a Doctors Without Borders France Coordinator in Somalia, the operation was particularly appalling because it targeted a building where a meeting of representatives of civil society was taking place. He further maintained that the discussions taking place were aimed at addressing the conflict and potentially pressuring Aideed into ending his standoff with UN forces.

The day after, the Organization of African Unity (OAU) criticized the attack. In Kenya, one of the countries largest papers, The Standard, ran a headline aimed at the UN titled, Who Are the Warlords Now?, and Kenyan state-run TV and radio broadcasting announced that it was joining other nations who were calling for a review of the UN's armed policy. Seven parliamentarians from across the Kenyan political spectrum jointly made a public condemnation of the killings of civilians at the hands of UNOSOM forces.

Across the West, Bloody Monday caught the most press and attention in Italy:

- The surprise assault became front page news across the country and the newspaper representing Italian Catholic bishops, Avvenire, referred to it as a "vile American raid."
- Another paper, La Repubblica, called the attack incomprehensible and unjustifiable and further likened the Americans in Somalia to Wild West lawmen who were attempting to shoot an outlaw in a saloon, but in the process kill innocent bystanders.
- The Vatican newspaper, L'Osservatore Romano commented on the raid saying: "...the original objective of the mission has been abandoned or momentarily forgotten. This act of reprisal was a real massacre."

Achille Occheto, head of Italy's Democratic Party of the Left, publicly decried the raid as an irresponsible act of war and said that Italian troops should withdraw if the mission was not exclusively humanitarian. In Germany, the death of photographer Hansi Krauss at the hands of the mob that had formed after the 12 July raid along with reports of Somali civilians being killed by U.S. helicopters shocked many German citizens, leading to significant debate in the nations press over the UN's and Germany's role in Somalia. The Social Democrats in Germany pushed against Chancellor Helmut Kohl’s offer to send a contingent of 1,600 German soldiers to Somalia, the first overseas deployment since the Second World War, and further called for it to be entirely withdrawn. The day following the raid former British Prime Minister Edward Heath criticized the UN, claiming that the emphasis on military operations was costing innocent lives and fuelling hatred for the West. At the American embassy in London, England saw protests and a group of people were arrested in the House of Commons for attempting to unfurl a banner and shouting, "Get the American murderers out of Somalia!" In the United States, Sen. Robert C. Byrd broke with his fellow Democrats and call for the U.S. troops in Somalia to return, becoming the first US Senator to publicly do so. On July 27, 1993, Ohio Congressman Sherrod Brown introduced Resolution 227, urging the withdrawal of American forces from Somalia as soon as possible.

The Pakistani and French governments strongly backed the raid and Pakistan's Foreign Ministry argued that without the American air strikes there would be chaos in the country.

=== Controversy and dissension within UNOSOM II ===
The attack exposed deep rifts and dissension amongst coalition nations contributing troops to UNOSOM II, such as Ireland, Kuwait, Saudi Arabia and Zimbabwe, but most notably from the Italian contingent, who threatened to pull out of the whole operation a few days later citing concerns that the escalation was indicative that relief role of UNOSOM II had been overtaken by an American-led campaign against Mohammed Farah Aidid. The head of the UNOSOM II Justice Division criticized the raid in a memo to head of UNOSOM Admiral Johnathan Howe.

The Italians, who had ruled Somalia as a colonial territory for half a century, believed that the unprecedented attack against the Habar Gidir threatened to widen the civil war and turn the Somalis against the entire UN peacekeeping force. Fabio Fabbri, then Italian defence minister, remarked that the decision to launch an attack that resulted in the killings of Somalis was opposed both by the Italian public and parliament. A Pakistani officer in Mogadishu noted that the clash between the Americans and Italians was destroying the cohesion of UNOSOM II, and that a review of strategy was desperately needed. The Irish government, a participant of UNOSOM II, publicly criticized the attack and demanded answers from the UN.

American envoy to Somalia, Robert B. Oakley, stated that after the raid countries such as Italy, France, and Zimbabwe, as well as other UNOSOM contingents, ceased their participation in operations against Aidid upon receiving orders from their respective governments. This decision weakened the United Nations' already fragile command authority. Additionally, many humanitarian efforts came to a halt, and numerous non-governmental organizations expressed their disapproval of both the United Nations and the United States. Intense diplomatic efforts were consequently made in order to avert a major split in UNOSOM II.

The strike also caused an outcry among UN civilian staffers and disenchantment over the direction of UNOSOM II for employees of the humanitarian section. At least nine UN civilian employees in Mogadishu working for the humanitarian sector either resigned or walked away from their posts in protest, including the top UNOSOM Justice Division official in Somalia, Ann Wright. Many of those who stayed commented to reporters that the United Nations had relinquished its moral authority in its war against Aidid.

The dissension in the UN ranks with the Italians and others over what had occurred on July 12, 1993 led to a significant lull in UNOSOM operations in Mogadishu until the August 8, 1993 killings of American soldiers.

==== Legality ====
The legality of the strike was a subject of disagreement within UNOSOM: while Ann Wright and colleagues in the Justice Division believed the strike was not legally justifiable, others, mostly within the military element of UNOSOM, publicly and privately justified the legality of the strike as within the authority granted by UN Resolution 837. However, those justifications did not address the moral and ethical aspects of the attack; as Ann Wright put it "...[it] undercuts UN credibility when we can not with accuracy state how many persons were killed or injured, who they were and why they were in the facility."

“From the legal, moral and human rights perspective, we counsel against conducting military operations that give no notice of attack to occupants of buildings...a deliberate attack meant to kill the occupants without giving all the occupants in the building a chance to surrender is nothing less than murder committed in the name of the United Nations.” Ann Wright, top UNOSOM Justice Division official in Somalia wrote in a memo to head of UNOSOM Johnathan Howe

Numerous human rights organizations, journalists and academics have criticized UNOSOM II for never producing evidence to substantiate its claims about the 12 July meeting. UNOSOM and its commanders claimed SNA personnel, that they allege ordered attacks on UN peacekeepers, were present and neutralized. Furthermore, they contended that raid was within their authority as granted by the UN resolution. So long as the operation was executed in good faith on the belief that it was a legitimate military target and that any civilian casualties were unintended, it would, for the most part, not contravene the laws of war. Sebastian Kaempf raises two issues with respect to proportionality of the response, namely whether a helicopter gunship attack with cannon fire and missiles was a proportional response and whether UNOSOM forces had done "everything feasible to verify that the objectives to be attacked are neither civilians nor civilian objects".

=== Somali Reaction ===
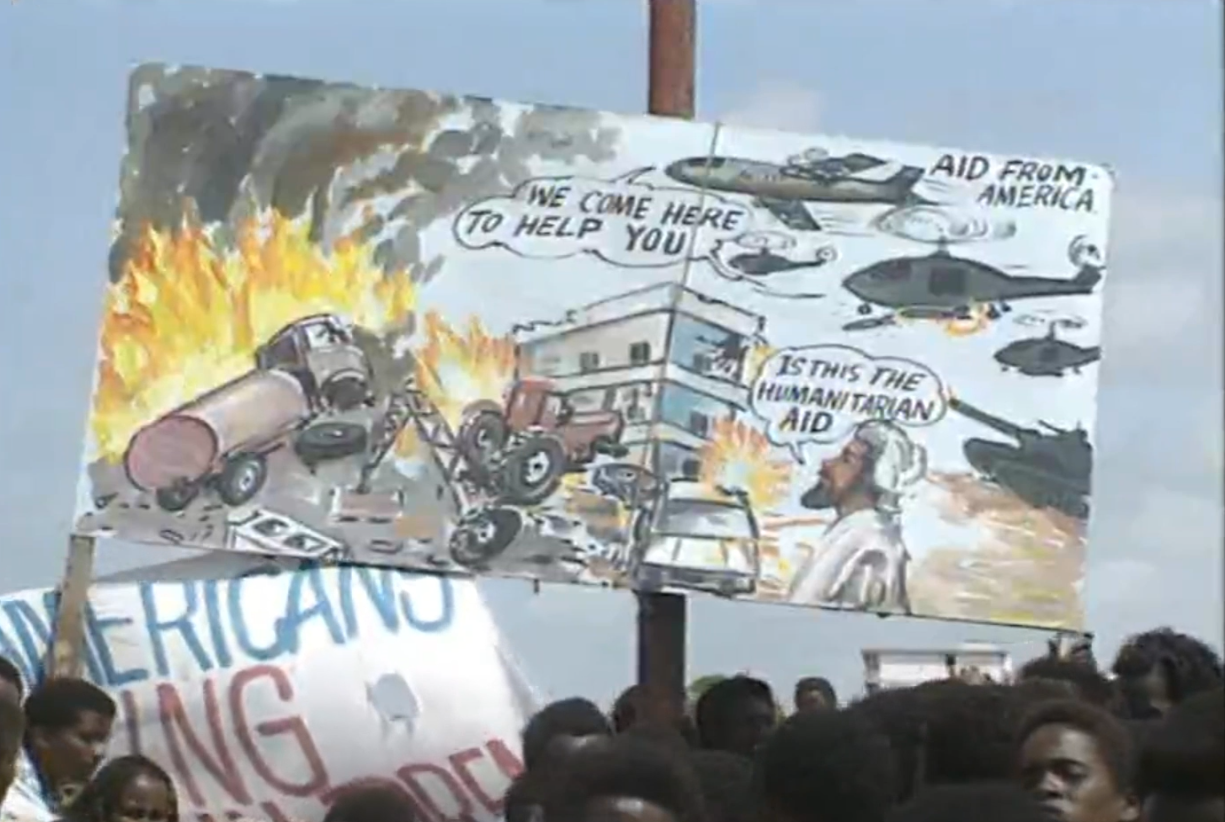
Sign at an Anti-American protest in Mogadishu depicting "Bloody Monday"

The unprecedented strike invoked outrage in Somalia. The atmosphere in Mogadishu became very tense and humanitarian work in the city came to a halt as the risk towards foreigners, especially Americans, had become the worst it had ever been since the start of the intervention. The Americans had begun to be viewed as a rogue entity within UNOSOM by many Somalis and local cooperation in Mogadishu, necessary for the UN to carry out its mandate, evaporated.

==== Shift in Somali Attitudes and Perception of UNOSOM ====
The outrage following the raid was so profound that even Somali adversaries of Aidid could not publicly endorse the operation. Consequently, after Bloody Monday, UNOSOM could no longer rely on the support of politico-military groups that were directly opposed to Aidid. According to Scott Peterson, "...Bloody Monday became the turning point — the day that Somalis turned almost unanimously against the UN missteps." Most notably, even forces loyal to Aidids primary rival, Ali Mahdi, began to display open contempt for UNOSOM following the attack. Aidid was now better able to count on the neutrality or even support of groups that had previously been unfavorable to him, as many Somalis from all walks of life felt that the peacekeepers had crossed a significant line. This line between peacekeeping and combat operations was termed the Mogadishu Line and affected international foreign policy for years to come.

"It's absolutely incomprehensible...This attack was excessive and unjust. You can't explain it to the Somali people or international community. Now people are very, very angry. There is a total divorce between the U.N. and Somali people. The Somali people feel now that it is an occupation force with a hidden agenda to take over the country. They don't feel U.N. troops have come to protect the humanitarian assistance." Mohamed Sahnoun, a former Algerian U.N. envoy to Somalia, commenting on the change in Somali attitudes towards UNOSOM

The UN's competence was called into question by many Somali citizens after Bloody Monday, as the very same elders and moderates who had met with US Admiral Johnathan Howe to discuss a peaceful resolution just three days prior had been among those killed. Abdiqasim Salad Hassan, a prominent member of the Habar Gidir (later president of the Transitional National Government during the early 2000's), had used his influence in the clan to press for diplomatic resolution to the war with UNOSOM and had met with Admiral Howe before the attack, but gave up his efforts following the raid. To the Habar Gidir, including the former moderates and even other clans that had formerly opposed them, the attack marked a declaration of outright war from the United States and signified the point where a diplomatic solution to the "Somalia problem" had become inconceivable.

Until 12 July, members of the SNA believed that the UN, and in particular its Secretary-General Boutros Ghali, had been manipulating the naïve Americans into supporting an imperialist Egyptian agenda under cover of a humanitarianism, but the raid had wiped away any residual sympathy for American misunderstandings. A few years earlier, Ghali had been an Egyptian diplomat that had supported former President Siad Barre against the SNA/USC when the civil war had broken out. According to the Associated Press a Somali National Alliance spokesman by the name of Hussein Dimdil was quoted saying, "We only want peace and reconciliation, and all we get is bombs."

According to Robert Oakley, the raid affected the Somali attitudes as much as the attack on Pakistanis had affected UNOSOM. In the notes for Black Hawk Down, Mark Bowden found while researching the book that the attack stirred up deep anger among Somalis from all walks of life that he interviewed in Mogadishu. Months after, in the Kenyan border town of Wajr, an American pilot was assassinated by the son of someone who had been killed in the raid. In 2015 two representatives of the Habar Gidir residing in Virginia, Mohamoud Iman Adan and the former Somali ambassador Ali Hassan Guled, hired the Washington legal firm Steven M. Schneebaum PC to assist them in their legal fight against the American government. They expressed the goal of seeking monetary compensation from the US government on behalf of their clan for the 12 July 1993 raid.

==== Escalation of Violence ====
In the weeks following 12 July, parts of the city turned into near-anarchy as UNOSOM positions all over Mogadishu were directly assaulted on a daily basis, forcing many foreign troops to withdraw into UN compounds. Protests against military operations consisting of thousands of demonstrators were held and UNOSOM night patrols had to be halted as the city had become hostile to foreign forces. Leaflets calling for reprisals against American soldiers and warning of a coming battle against international troops were spread across Mogadishu.

On the afternoon of 12 July 1993 the Somali National Alliance announced that it would continue to fight "...until the last colonial soldier of the United Nations leaves." On 13 July, three Americans soldiers were wounded in ambushes, followed by two more on 14 July and numerous others later in the month. For the remainder of July firefights between the SNA and UNOSOM were occurring almost daily. The SNA put out a bounty for any American soldier or UN personnel killed, and attacks against UNOSOM II forces doubled in July and August 1993.

== Prelude to Battle of Mogadishu ==
The raid was the first time the UNOSOM II forces in Somalia had deliberately targeted people instead of buildings or armaments caches, marking a decisive turning point in what had until then been a low-level intensity conflict. A 2004 US military-sanctioned case study on military operations in Somalia during UNOSOM II observed that a shift to combat operations was reflected in the liberalization of the rules of engagement during the raid. In the two and half years since the civil war had begun, Bloody Monday at the time represented the deadliest loss from a single attack the city had seen. Many Somalis, UN personnel, humanitarian organizations and journalists believed that the strike had marked an unnecessary escalation that had devolved the Americans and UN peacekeepers into just another belligerent faction involved in the Somali Civil War, fears that were exacerbated by comments from UN officials who publicly warned that UNOSOM had a list of ten more alleged command and control centers to be raided in a similar fashion.

According to Sebastian Kaempf, the 12 July 1993 Abdi House raid represented the single most important event during UNOSOM II, as the consequences of the attack proved disastrous for UNOSOM interests in Somalia. To thousands of the city's residents, Aidid's anti-UNOSOM rhetoric warning of an ever growing neocolonialist and imperialist international intervention had been validated, which greatly enabled him to consolidate and expand power across the divisive clan lines of war torn Mogadishu, making the city far more dangerous for international troops to operate in. In the view of Mark Bowden 12 July had the effect of firmly uniting a large portion of Mogadishu behind Aidid. The attack was designed to destroy Aidid’s power base, but instead it resulted in increased support for Aidid and intensified opposition to UNOSOM across Mogadishu. The attack significantly undercut the growing internal opposition in the Habar Gidir to Aidids methods and solidified his political leadership in the Somali National Alliance. Historian Stephen Biddle observed that a contentious internal debate over Aidid's future following Howe's June pronouncement came to an end with the 12 July raid, which resulted in the Habar Gidir unifying around Aidid. In the view of US special envoy to Somalia Robert B. Oakley, the incident caused many non–Habar Gidir Somalis to sympathize and even join forces with the Somali National Alliance and further increased Aidid’s support among those Habar Gidir who had not previously been with him.

The events of Bloody Monday led Aidid to make the decision to specifically target American soldiers for the first time and resulted in the August 8, 1993, killings of US troops that pushed President Clinton to send in Delta Force and the Rangers to capture him. According to Oakley: "Before July 12th, the US would have been attacked only because of association with the UN, but the US was never singled out until after July 12th" Abdi Abshir Kahiye, an SNA spokesman, stated that the focus shifted from the UN to deliberately targeting American troops to create domestic political issues in the United States.

== Works cited ==
- Bowden, Mark (1999). Black Hawk Down: A Story of Modern War. Berkeley, CA: Atlantic Monthly Press. ISBN 978-0-87113-738-8. Available at Archive.org.
- Pouligny, Béatrice (2006). Peace operations seen from below : UN missions and local people. Bloomfield, CT: Kumarian Press. ISBN 1-56549-224-2. OCLC 64486263.
- Drysdale, John (1994). Whatever Happened to Somalia?: A tale of tragic blunders. Britain: Haan. ISBN 1874209510.
- Kaempf, Sebastian (2018). Saving Soldiers or Civilians? : Casualty Aversion Versus Civilian Protection in Asymmetric Conflicts. Cambridge: Cambridge University Press. ISBN 978-1-108-42764-7. OCLC 1032810239.
- Peterson, Scott (2000). Me Against My Brother: At War in Somalia, Sudan, and Rwanda: A Journalist Reports From the Battlefields of Africa. New York: Routledge. ISBN 9780415921985. OCLC 43287853.
- The United Nations and Somalia 1992-1996. The United Nations Blue Book Series. Vol. VIII. New York, NY: United Nations Department of Public Information. 1996. ISBN 978-92-1-100566-0. Archived from the original on 8 August 2022.
- "United States Forces, Somalia After Action Report and Historical Overview: The United States Army in Somalia, 1992–1994" (PDF). United States Army Center of Military History. 2003. Archived from the original (PDF) on 1 August 2022.
