= 1993 UN killings of Somali protestors =

Mass shooting by UN troops in Mogadishu, Somalia

Shooting of Somali demonstrators by UNOSOM II forces
- Location: Mogadishu, Somalia
- Date: 13 June 1993
- Attack type: Mass Shooting
- Weapon: Machine gun
- Deaths: 20 killed
- Injuries: Over 50 injured
- Victim: Somali citizens
- Perpetrator: Pakistan Army contingent of UNOSOM II

On 13 June 1993, an element of the Pakistani contingent of UNOSOM II opened fire with a machine gun onto a crowd of protestors in Mogadishu, Somalia, shooting approximately 70 Somalis. At least 20 people were killed in the attack, including women and children, and more than 50 others were wounded. The shooting took place in the aftermath of the 5 June 1993 clash at Radio Mogadishu a week prior.

The killings fed into a growing anti-United Nations sentiment among Somali citizens, leading to greater public support for the Somali National Alliance against UNOSOM II forces.

== Attack on Pakistanis and rising tensions in Mogadishu ==
On 5 June 1993, the Pakistani contingent of UNOSOM II suffered the loss of 25 of its peacekeepers in a battle with Somali militia and citizens after an armed confrontation at Radio Mogadishu, marking the single deadliest killing UN forces since the Congo in 1961. Following the killing a number of UN and Western diplomats expressed fears that some Pakistanis, enraged over the slaying of their comrades might overact or seek retaliation.

At 6 pm on the day following the 5 June incident, a minibus carrying unarmed civilians traveling on Suuqa Hoola Road was fired on by Pakistani UNOSOM forces, allegedly resulting in the death of four passengers and several wounded.

=== 12 June Shooting ===
On 12 June, Pakistani troops shot into a small crowd of civilians on Afgoy road while they had been marching towards U.N. headquarters to protest military operations in the Mogadishu. As the demonstrators passed the Pakistanis, they began throwing stones and a ten year old in the crowd reportedly made an "obscene gesture" towards the soldiers. This was met with an immediate response of shooting from the Pakistani position, narrowly missing the ten year old, but resulting the in death of a man and woman, with some witness reporting a third fatality. Professor Alex de Waal noted:

"It is normal military procedure that when a unit has suffered casualties in the manner that the Pakistanis did on 5 June, that unit is withdrawn from active duty for a while, for fear that it will engage in reprisals. UNOSOM has no such procedures. It reveals a major failing of UNOSOM command that it continued to deploy the Pakistanis at potential flashpoints in the center of Mogadishu immediately after the 5 June killings."

De Waal would further criticized UNOSOM for not launching an investigation into the 12 June killings, arguing that the incident was a clear violation of human rights as the Pakistanis had faced no threat from the protestors when they had opened fire.

== Protest and shooting ==
Following the first night of AC-130 strikes in Mogadishu on 12 June 1993, anti-UNOSOM protests erupted throughout the city.

On Sunday 13 June, at 10:30 in the morning, 3,000 to 4,000 Somalis were marching in demonstration against UNOSOM military operations near a Pakistani position. More than a block away from the crowd, the troops opened fire with a belt-fed machine gun from a sandbagged emplacement on a building rooftop overlooking the streets, without any warning according to Somali and foreign journalists accounts. According to Toronto Star reporter Paul Watson who was present at the protest, "I do not recall hearing a shot before the Pakistanis opened fire. They fired hundreds of rounds."

According to numerous reporters who witnessed the incident, UNOSOM troops had shot a Somali woman who had been leading the march in the leg, and then shot again as she lay in the street screaming in pain. A 10-year old bystander was shot in the head and 2-year-old boy named Hussein Ali Ibrahim was half a mile away when he was struck in the abdomen and killed in the barrage of machine gun fire. The New York Times reported at least five people who were hiding behind vehicles when they were killed. Washington Post reporter Keith Richburg also noted that the pattern of hundreds of rounds fired suggested that the Pakistanis had opened fire down several streets and into directions where people had been fleeing.

Multiple rounds hit the side of the hotel housing journalists, with one of the stray rounds punching a hole in the wall and narrowly missing an Associated Press reporter in the shower. According to Alexander Joe, a photographer with Agence France-Presse, later a Pakistani U.N. convoy drove closely past children on the street who had been wounded in the shooting, pleading for their help and proceeded to ignore them.

In the aftermath of the shooting, war correspondent Scott Peterson and The Guardian reporter Mark Huband were mobbed by Somalis who informed them that they would not be allowed to leave until the collected the bodies of the victims, as they believed UNOSOM troops would not dare shoot at white foreigners. The two journalists would collect the dead and wounded help drive them to Banadir Hospital. War correspondent Donatella Lorch would report in The New York Times the deaths of a young man and pregnant woman at Banadir Hospital who, according to relatives, both been shot in the chest by Pakistani soldiers. The pregnant woman was reported to have died a few minutes before her husband ran into the room holding a plastic bag for a blood transfusion. Describing the Somali reaction at the hospital, she would report:

For a few seconds there was silence, and then anger spread through the crowd that had gathered. "How could anyone do this?" said Mahdad Hassan Ghani, a staff worker at Benadir. "All the people of Somalia are against the United Nations action. We are all ready to die."

=== United Nations account of incident ===
Commander of Pakistani forces in Somalia, Brig. Gen. Ikram ul-Hasan, claimed that Somali gunmen mixed into the demonstration had fired at his soldiers. He further insinuated that it was possible that Somali gunmen used women and children as human shields. Ikram also stated that he believed his troops had first ordered the crowd to disperse and then fired warning shots, counter to Somali and foreign journalist witnesses accounts who reported hearing no warnings from the Pakistanis. Hours after the shooting, the U.N. Secretary-General's special representative to Somalia, retired U.S. Adm. Jonathan Howe, defended the Pakistanis actions in an interview with the BBC. He alleged that demonstrators had advanced on the Pakistani positions using women and children as human shields, and that the Pakistanis had fired warning shots.

According to The Washington Post, the UNOSOM account of the shooting was, "...disputed by virtually all witnesses to the incident."

== Aftermath ==
Killings of civilians by peace keepers on 12 and 13 of June inflamed animosity towards the UNOSOM II among Somali citizens. The spectacle of Somali civilians being machine gunned by UNOSOM forces shocked many U.N. officials and diplomats, and many consequently viewed it as a severe blow to U.N. credibility as a restorative force among the Somali people. One U.N. official commented that the incident had been a disaster and that UNOSOM had lost the moral high ground. The following day on the 14 June, Doctors Without Borders responded to the killings with press release denouncing the excessive use of force by UNOSOM II troops and the president of the organization decried the incident as "monstrous".

Commander of Pakistani forces in Somalia, Brig. Gen. Ikram ul-Hasan, denied accusations from reporters that his men were seeking retaliation for the 5 June 1993 ambush and American ambassador to the United Nations Madeleine Albright publicly defended that actions of the Pakistanis as executed in self defence.

In an incident that did not go unnoticed in Mogadishu, a few days after the shooting US President Bill Clinton held a news conference in which he heavily criticized Aidid for his killing of UNOSOM soldiers, but made no condemnation of the killings of Somali civilians at the hands of U.N. forces. The killings fed into a growing anti-United Nations sentiment among Somali citizens, which the Somali National Alliance would seize on.

== See also ==
- Bloody Monday raid
- Al-Hidaya Mosque massacre
