= Black Hawk Down (book) =

1999 book by Mark Bowden

Black Hawk Down: A Story of Modern War
- First-edition cover
- Author: Mark Bowden
- Language: English
- Subject: Battle of Mogadishu (1993)
- Genre: War; Historical non-fiction
- Publisher: Signet Books
- Publication date: February 10, 1999
- Publication place: United States
- Media type: Hardcover; Trade paperback
- Pages: 392
- ISBN: 978-0-87113-738-8

Black Hawk Down: A Story of Modern War is a 1999 book by journalist Mark Bowden. It documents efforts by the Unified Task Force to capture Somali faction leader Mohamed Farrah Aidid in 1993, and the resulting battle in Mogadishu between United States forces and Aidid's militia.

A key event is the downing of two United States MH-60 Black Hawk helicopters, from which the book derives its title, and the attempt to rescue their crews. United States forces included the 3rd Battalion, 75th Ranger Regiment; 160th SOAR; Delta Force 24th Special Tactics Squadron; DEVGRU Navy SEALs; 10th Mountain Division; and Malaysian and Pakistani United Nations peacekeeping forces.

The raid became the most intense close combat in U.S. military history since the Vietnam War. Although the overall mission to apprehend Aidid was officially codenamed Operation Gothic Serpent, the media colloquially termed the incident the Battle of Mogadishu as well as the Battle of the Black Sea.

== History ==
Black Hawk Down: A Story of Modern War is based on a series of 29 articles written by journalist Mark Bowden for The Philadelphia Inquirer. He did extensive research in US Army records, interviewed participants from both sides of the conflict, reviewed footage recorded by observation aircraft, and listened to recordings of radio traffic. Before the book was published, Bowden's series had already begun to attract attention within the media. It consisted of a CD-ROM, an hour-long video, and an audiovisual series on The Inquirer's Web site.

Delta Force member Paul R. Howe provided much of the information about the Delta force operations for the writing of the book. Bowden met with Howe in 1997 after clearing it with Howe's commanding officer. Other Delta Force members also consulted for the book, but did not allow the use of their real names. Howe has faced some criticism for allowing Bowden to use his real name.

In January 1991, militias overthrew the regime of President Siad Barre which led to the Somali Civil War. The United Nations later arranged a US-led intervention, with a mandate to engage in state building and encourage the militias to share power and begin to form a new government.

In December 1992, President George H. W. Bush sent United States Marines into Somalia as part of a UN effort to secure transportation routes to deliver relief and food supplies, which had been disrupted by local militias. Uninterested in sharing power, Mohamed Farrah Aidid began to regard the ongoing UN mission as hostile and ambushed a peacekeeping convoy in June 1993, killing 24 Pakistani soldiers.

The UN mission's commander, U.S. Admiral Jonathan Howe, declared Aidid an outlaw, and the faction leader's forces and supporters began targeting the officer. The hunt for Aidid included a disputed attack on a house of clan officials and resulted in civilian casualties and increasing civilian hostility against the UN efforts, especially their use of helicopters. As a result, President Clinton approved Operation Gothic Serpent, a JSOC mission to apprehend Aidid.

The operation created Task Force Ranger which was composed of Rangers, Delta Force, 24th Special Tactics Squadron airmen, DEVGRU Navy SEALs, and 160th SOAR aviators. One of the operation's missions led to several Black Hawk helicopters being shot down and an extended bloody battle between task force and UN forces against Somali militia.

After the battle, the hunt for Aidid was called off. The U.S. pulled out, with the UN following suit a few months later. In 1996, Aidid died from wounds sustained during a battle against a rival militia. A new interim central administration, the Transitional National Government, was eventually formed in 2000, a year after Bowden's book was published.

== Critical reception ==
Bowden's narrative was generally praised, particularly his efforts at contextualizing the local and international politics and explaining how the peacekeeping mission devolved into armed conflict, later termed the "Mogadishu Line".

A New York Times piece found he conveyed the battle as a gripping narrative, giving a minute-by-minute account of the United States campaign in Mogadishu, known as the Battle of the Black Sea. It added that Bowden rapidly shifts viewpoints after US ground forces enter the city, trying to extract a couple of Aidid leaders and then, when things go wrong, rescue US forces. The piece remarked how Bowden simultaneously manages to capture the siege mentality felt by both civilians and the US soldiers, and the broad sentiment among many residents that the Rangers were to blame for the majority of the battle casualties.

The book was a finalist for the 1999 National Book Award for Nonfiction.

== Adaptations ==
- The story first ran on November 16, 1997, as a 29-part newspaper series that was adapted to an online multimedia package, a first for The Philadelphia Inquirer. Bowden had amassed a large number of notes, audiotapes, documents, photos, and radio transcripts, and worked with the digital team at the Inquirer to post it online. At the time it served as one of the more innovative examples of multimedia storytelling by a news organization. The published online package contained videos, audio clips, graphics, maps, and links to external resources.
- The book was accompanied by a video, Somalia: Good Intentions, Deadly Results, produced by KVR Video, that was aired on CNN on 24 March 1999 in a 57-minute version, as Black Hawk Down: A Story of Modern War; it later won an Emmy.
- The book was adapted into a 2001 film, directed by Ridley Scott and produced by Jerry Bruckheimer.

== See also ==
- Battle of Mogadishu (1993)
- In the Company of Heroes
- Black Hawk Down (film)
- Surviving Black Hawk Down

== Works cited ==
- Bowden, Mark (1999). Black Hawk Down: A Story of Modern War. Berkeley, CA: Atlantic Monthly Press. ISBN 978-0-87113-738-8.
