= Thomas M. Montgomery =

American soldier (born 1941)

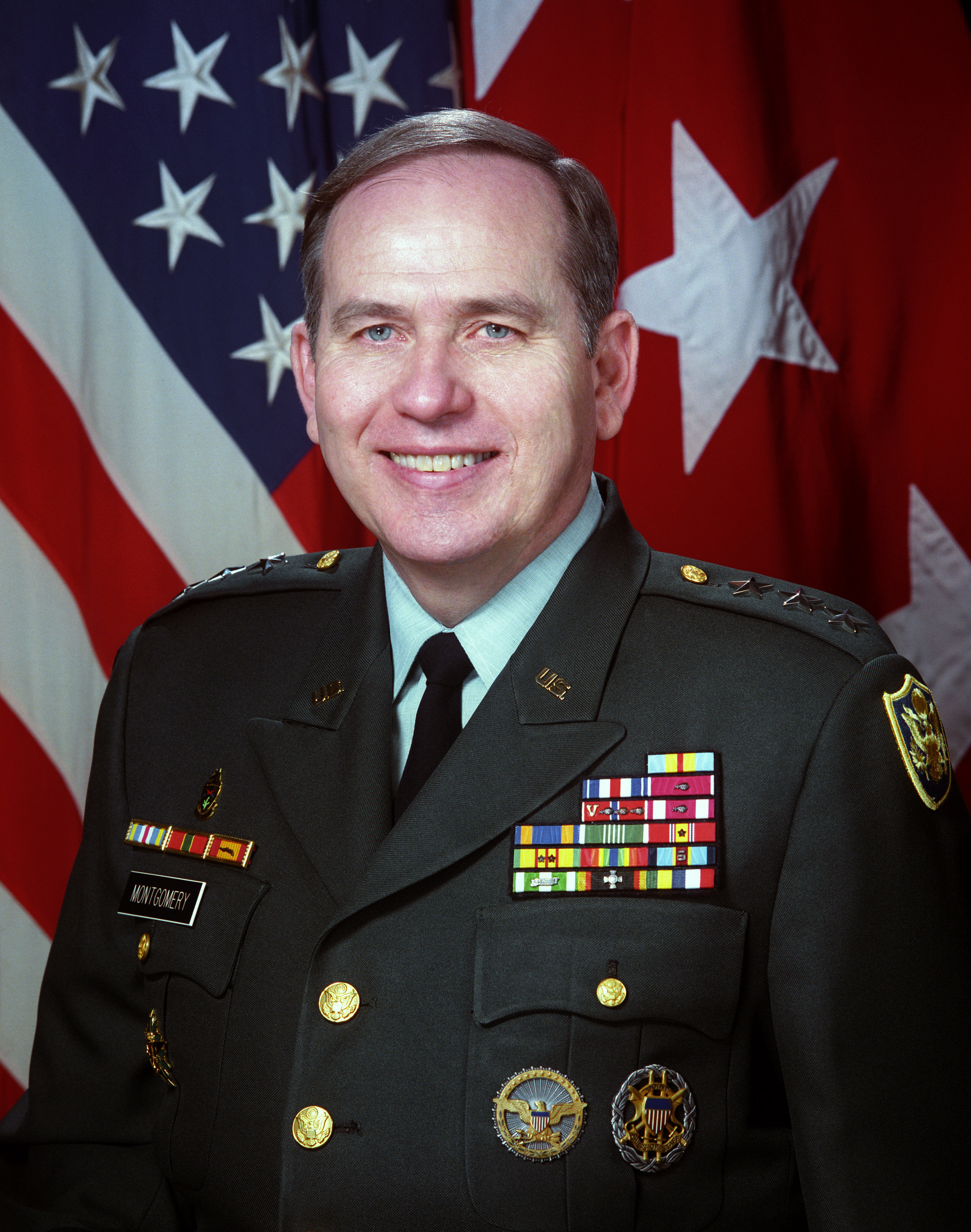
- Born: January 23, 1941 (age 85); Indianapolis, Indiana, United States
- Military career
- Allegiance: United States
- Branch: United States Army
- Service years: 1963–1997
- Rank: Lieutenant General
- Commands: 1st Brigade, 1st Armored Division
- Conflicts: Vietnam War; Somali Civil War
- Awards: Defense Distinguished Service Medal; Silver Star

Thomas M. Montgomery (born January 23, 1941) is an American soldier who retired from the United States Army in 1997 at the rank of Lieutenant General. A native of Indiana and graduate of Indiana University, he entered military service in 1963 and commanded an armored company during the Vietnam War, during which he was decorated with the Silver Star for gallantry in the face of the enemy. During the Somali Civil War, he served as deputy commander of the military element of UNOSOM II and would later spend three years as U.S. representative to the NATO Military Committee.

== Early life and education ==
Thomas M. Montgomery was born and raised in Indianapolis, Indiana. He received a B.A. degree in Slavic Languages from Indiana University and later earned a Master of Arts in Management from Central Michigan University. He also attended the Armed Forces Staff College and the Army War College.

== Career ==
=== Vietnam War ===
Montgomery was commissioned a 2nd Lieutenant through the Indiana University Reserve Officer Training Corps and entered the U.S. Army in 1963. As an officer in the 11th Armored Cavalry Regiment, Montgomery saw action during the Vietnam War. On February 26, 1969, his unit was ambushed by Viet Cong and Vietnamese People's Army (PAVN) forces, during which one of the tanks under his command was disabled by a rocket propelled grenade. Montgomery used his own vehicle to shield the disabled tank, and – despite it also being hit by RPG fire – successfully commanded the evacuation of his wounded men, after which he led his soldiers in overrunning the PAVN positions. For his actions, he was awarded the Silver Star and the Bronze Star with "V" device.

=== After Vietnam ===
Following the Vietnam War, Montgomery held a variety command and staff assignments, including as commanding officer of the 2nd Battalion, 34th Armor Regiment; as commanding officer of the 1st Brigade, 1st Armored Division (United States); and as director of management to the U.S. Army Chief of Staff.

=== UNOSOM II ===
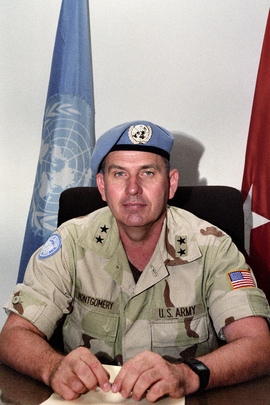
Montgomery served as deputy commander of the military element of UNOSOM II.

In 1993, Montgomery was designated deputy commander of United Nations Forces in Somalia under Turkish Gen. Çevik Bir, part of the UNOSOM II mission led by Admiral Jonathan Howe. Though he was deputy commander, the U.S.-comprised Quick Reaction Force fell under Montgomery's exclusive control. However, American special forces in Somalia – including the Delta Force operators and Army Rangers who would later undertake Operation Gothic Serpent – were outside of Montgomery's jurisdiction, instead reporting to Gen. William F. Garrison.

Montgomery was well aware of the dangerous environment in Somalia - his own vehicle had been hit by bullets in April – but he did not anticipate the scale of violence that erupted. It had been assumed by Pentagon planners that UN forces in Somalia would face bandits, not centrally directed guerrillas.

From the beginning, political reticence and miscalculations left UNOSOM II with insufficient troops or equipment to fulfill its mandate, a state of affairs that emboldened local militias. Montgomery was the commander of U.S. troops when the Bloody Monday raid took place on 12 July 1993. The raid elicited such a strong reaction from Somalis that even forces loyal to Mohamed Farah Aidid's main rival, Ali Mahdi, began displaying open contempt for UNOSOM. In an interview with Scott Peterson, he defended the raid, highlighting the discovery of "tactical radios" at the villa. The operation faced significant international criticism. Frustrated by the backlash, Montgomery told the New York Times that it seemed like Somali militias had the "inalienable right" to attack UNOSOM forces, but it was deemed a "human rights violation" when UNOSOM retaliated.

In a later interview with Frontline, Montgomery would note that "there were only eight tanks in Mogadishu....they were old American tanks that had been given to the Pakistanis, and of those only four were operational". In the middle of September 1993, due to the deteriorating situation in the country and out of what the Washington Post later described as a "pressing concern for the safety of his troops", Montgomery transmitted a classified and urgent request to the Pentagon for heavy armor. The request was denied by United States Secretary of Defense Les Aspin due to what Paul Greenberg would characterize as a politically motivated calculation designed to avoid causing "a stir in Congress". Ten days after Montgomery's appeal for tanks was rejected, during the Battle of Mogadishu 18 American soldiers were killed; their timely rescue was foiled by UNOSOM II's lack of armor. Aspin accepted blame for the disaster and resigned his office.

Montgomery was subsequently designated commander of Joint Task Force Somalia and given command of the American withdrawal from the country. Due to the extremely dangerous situation on the ground, Montgomery pressed to keep a significant U.S. force in Somalia through the final date of redeployment, emphasizing that the last element to depart should be "an Abrams tank with its gun tube pointed toward Mogadishu".

=== NATO ===
From 1994 to 1997, Montgomery served as the United States representative to the NATO Military Committee.

=== Retirement ===
Montgomery retired from the U.S. Army in 1997. In the years following his retirement from active military service, Montgomery was involved in mentoring Reserve Officer Training Corps cadets at his alma mater, Indiana University, and also served on the board of trustees of the Command and General Staff College Foundation.

== Personal life ==
As of 2015, Montgomery resided in Fishers, Indiana.

== Awards and honors ==
=== Decorations ===
U.S. military decorations
Defense Distinguished Service Medal (with 2 Oak Leaf Clusters)
Silver Star
Distinguished Service Medal
Bronze Star (with 3 Oak Leaf Clusters)
Air Medal
Meritorious Service Medal (with 2 Oak Leaf Clusters)
Army Commendation Medal

Non-U.S. orders and decorations
Order of Merit of the Federal Republic of Germany (Knight Commander)
United Nations Medal
Honor Cross of the Bundeswehr (in Silver)

=== Other recognition ===
In 2015, Montgomery was recognized with Indiana University's Distinguished Alumni Award, described by the institution as "one of its highest honors". Two years later, he was elected to the Indiana Military Veteran Hall of Fame as part of its third class of inductees.
