= Peter S. Bridges =

American author and diplomat (1932–2022)

United States Ambassador to Somalia
- In office December 19, 1984 – May 14, 1986
- President: Ronald Reagan
- Preceded by: Robert B. Oakley
- Succeeded by: John L. Hirsch

Personal details
- Born: June 19, 1932 New Orleans, Louisiana, U.S.
- Died: August 13, 2022 (aged 90) Arlington, Virginia, U.S.
- Education: Dartmouth College, Columbia University

Peter Scott Bridges (June 19, 1932 – August 13, 2022) was an author and diplomat who served as the United States ambassador to Somalia from 1984 to 1986.

== Personal ==
Bridges was born in New Orleans, Louisiana, the son of Charles Scott Bridges and Shirley Amélie Devlin Bridges, and grew up in Illinois.

In 1949, he graduated from Hinsdale Township High School in Hinsdale, Illinois. In 1953, Bridges received a B.A. from Dartmouth College and in 1955, a Ford Foundation graduate scholarship, M.A., and the Certificate of the Russian Institute from Columbia University.

In 1955 Bridges married Mary Jane Lee of Chicago, a graduate of Northwestern University and the first woman to hold a Standard & Poor fellowship in the Graduate School of Business of Columbia University. They had four children, David Scott Bridges, Elizabeth Lee Bridges Caughlin, Mary Bartow Bridges Jensen, and Andrew Devlin Bridges, and six grandchildren. He penned sonnets.

== Career ==
He served in the U.S. Army from 1955 to 1957. He attended basic training at Fort Leonard Wood, Missouri as a private and served in the 97th Engineer Battalion in Verdun, France. He left the army in 1957 and was commissioned as a career U.S. Foreign Service officer in that same year. During three decades in the Foreign Service he served in the Department of State as director of the offices of Performance Evaluation, United Nations political affairs, and Eastern European affairs, and as deputy executive secretary of the department; as an international-relations officer in the U.S. Arms Control & Disarmament Agency; and as the executive secretary of the Treasury Department. He served overseas in the American embassies at Panama (1959–1961), Moscow (1962–1964), Prague (1971–1974), Rome (1966–1971 and 1981–1984, when he was Deputy Chief of Mission), and finally Mogadishu. As the American ambassador to Somalia in 1984–1986, Bridges supervised one of the largest U.S. civilian and military aid programs in Sub-Sahara Africa, and was highly praised by President Ronald Reagan on retiring from government in 1986.

After leaving government service Bridges worked successively as the executive director of the Una Chapman Cox Foundation in Washington, the manager international affairs of Shell Oil Company in Houston, and the resident representative in the Czech Republic of the European Bank for Reconstruction & Development.

In 2020, Bridges, along with over 130 other former Republican national security officials, signed a statement that asserted that President Trump was unfit to serve another term, and "To that end, we are firmly convinced that it is in the best interest of our nation that Vice President Joe Biden be elected as the next President of the United States, and we will vote for him."

== Publications ==
Bridges was the author of Safirka: An American Envoy (Kent State University Press, 2000), a memoir of his experiences in Somalia, and Pen of Fire: John Moncure Daniel (Kent State, 2002), the first biography of the American diplomat and Confederate editor.

He has contributed articles, reviews, and essays — including on his life as a diplomat and walking tours throughout Italy — to:

- The Christian Science Monitor
- Diplomacy & Statecraft
- Foreign Service Journal
- Los Angeles Times
- Michigan Quarterly Review
- Notes & Records of the Royal Society of London
- Virginia Quarterly Review

He was a regular contributor to the online California Literary Review.

Diplomatic posts
Preceded by Robert B. Oakley	U.S. Ambassador to Somalia; December 19, 1984 – May 14, 1986	Succeeded by John L. Hirsch (interim)
