= Surviving Black Hawk Down =

2025 Netflix historical documentary

- Genre: Documentary
- Directed by: Jack MacInnes; Sam Hobkinson
- Starring: Alex Brockdorff; Matthew Thomas-Robinson; Nick Pinninger; Reggie McHale
- Composers: Chris Roe & Nir Perlman
- Country of origin: United States
- Original languages: English; Somali
- No. of seasons: 1
- No. of episodes: 3

Production
- Running time: 47–56 minutes
- Production company: Ridley Scott Associates

Original release
- Network: Netflix
- Release: February 10, 2025

Surviving Black Hawk Down is a 2025 Netflix mini-series historical documentary addressing the Battle of Mogadishu in Somalia, October 1993. The documentary involves interviews with survivors from both sides of the conflict, including Somali fighters and residents of Mogadishu, and is presented in three parts. The series was directed by Jack MacInnes and produced by Ridley Scott Associates. Ridley Scott had previously directed and produced the 2001 war film Black Hawk Down, based on the 1999 book by journalist Mark Bowden. The series was released on February 10, 2025.

== Viewership ==
According to data from Showlabs, Surviving Black Hawk Down ranked fifth on Netflix in the United States during the week of 10–16 February 2025.

== See also ==
- Black Hawk Down (book)
- Black Hawk Down (2001 film)
- MALBATT: Misi Bakara (2023 film)
- Battle of Mogadishu (1993)
