= June 1993 attack on Pakistani military in Somalia =

Battle between Pakistani peacekeepers and Somali rebels

June 1993 attack on Pakistanis
- Part of UNOSOM II
Date	5 June 1993
Location	Mogadishu, Somalia

Belligerents
UNOSOM II: Pakistan; United States; Italy	(Somalia) Somali National Alliance

Casualties and losses
(Pakistan) 25 killed, 59 wounded (United States) 3 wounded (Italy) 2 wounded	(Somalia) 16 – 35 killed, 350 injured (Per. SNA)

The June 1993 attack on the Pakistani military was a major confrontation that occurred concurrently in different parts of the Somali capital of Mogadishu, between Somali citizens & militias against the Pakistani peacekeeping contingent of UNOSOM II.

The incident was provoked by an attempt by UNOSOM troops to inspect or shut down Radio Mogadishu, then controlled by the Somali National Alliance (SNA). The SNA, under the leadership of General Mohammed Farah Aidid, denied initiating the attack and demanded an unbiased commission to ascertain the culprits. Dozens of UNOSOM troops, insurgents and civilians were killed or wounded in the battle. Several UN forces were killed by friendly fire from attack helicopters attempting to relieve them. A UN inquiry later asserted that although the attack was probably not premeditated, the SNA was most likely responsible for initiating it.

Over a week after the battle Pakistani troops fired on Somali protestors with a machine gun, killing dozens of civilians.

The death of the Pakistani troops marked a seminal moment for UN mission to Somalia. It was one of the deadliest losses of UN peacekeepers and resulted in the operation being primarily characterized by the hunt for General Aidid. Following the passing of UNSCR 837 on 6 June 1993, UNOSOM II and the SNA would engage in a devastating four-month long conflict until the cessation of hostilities following the Battle of Mogadishu.

== Background ==
=== Rising tensions between UNOSOM II and SNA ===
Major disagreements between the UN and the Somali National Alliance began soon after the establishment of UNOSOM II, centering on the perceived true nature of the operations political mandate. By May 1993, relations between the SNA and UNOSOM were rapidly deteriorating.

In early May 1993, Gen. Aidid and Col. Abdullahi Yusuf of the Somali Salvation Democratic Front (SSDF) agreed to convene a peace conference for central Somalia. In light of recent conflict between the two, the initiative was seen a major step towards halting the Somali Civil War. Gen. Aidid, having initiated the talks with Col. Yusuf, considered himself the conference chair, setting the agenda. Beginning 9 May, elder delegations from their respective clans, Habr Gidr and Majerteen, met. While Aidid and Yusuf aimed for a central Somalia-focused conference, they clashed with UNOSOM, which aimed to include other regions and replace Aidid's chairmanship with ex-President Abdullah Osman, a staunch critic of Aidid. As the conference began, Aidid sought assistance from UNOSOM ambassador Lansana Kouyate, who proposed air transport for delegates and a 14-day accommodation. However, he was called back to New York and replaced by April Glaspie, following which UNOSOM retracted its offer. Aidid resorted to private aircraft to transport delegates. Following the aircraft incident, Aidid publicly rebuked the United Nations on Radio Mogadishu for interference in Somali internal affairs.

Aidid invited Special Representative of the Secretary-General for Somalia, Adm. Johnathan Howe to open the conference, which was refused. The differences between Aidid and the UN proved to be too great, and the conference proceeded without the United Nations participation. On the 2 June 1993 the conference between Gen. Aidid and Col. Abdullahi Yusuf successfully concluded. Admiral Howe was invited to witness the peace agreement, but again declined. The Galkayo peace accord successfully ended large scale conflict in the Galgadud and Mudug regions of Somalia. The contention between the Somali National Alliance and UNOSOM from this point forward began to manifest in anti-UNOSOM propaganda broadcast from SNA controlled Radio Mogadishu.

=== Radio Mogadishu ===
Radio Mogadishu was a popular broadcasting station controlled by the SNA. It had in recent weeks begun airing anti American and anti-UNOSOM propaganda condemning interference in Somali politics after UN envoy Admiral Johnathan Howe had rejected the May peace conference Aidid had set up. On the airwaves Aidid publicly accused UNOSOM II of engaging in colonialism and imperialist designs. These broadcasts greatly incensed UNOSOM officials and consequently a significant debate occurred over how best to deal with the station. According to then UNOSOM advisor John Drysdale, the UN's 'obsession' with the station was largely driven by US diplomat April Glaspie. She held the view that the station should be destroyed or transferred to UNOSOM control and felt so passionately about the issue that she had threatened to resign if the station was not dealt with. While certain UN officials felt that Radio Mogadishu broadcasts had become a threat to UNOSOM's image, other officials and advisors noted that the broadcasts rhetoric were relatively mild and well within the bounds of reasonable speech. Drysdale argues that, "There was virtually nothing in these broadcasts during May to which UNOSOM could have taken exception to. The language was moderate; there was no incitement, no subversion."

From 1 May to 3 June 1993, Aidid spoke on the station publicly eight times. Four of the broadcasts were critical of UNOSOM and focused on the UN's handling of the May peace conference. There were also three uncritical statements of UNOSOM, during which he thanked officials publicly for aiding Somalia's rehabilitation. The most serious public criticism was on 3 June 1993, when Aidid accused the UN of interference in the creation of a judiciary.

On May 31, 1993, Aidids political rivals met with Johnathan Howe and attempted to convince him to take over Radio Mogadishu, a meeting Aidid was made well aware of. Rumor quickly began spreading across the city that the UNOSOM had actually resolved to shut down Radio Mogadishu entirely, which further angered Aidid, rumors which were corroborated after the fact by the US special envoy to Somalia, Robert B. Oakley. The belief that UNOSOM was planning to seize the station was reportedly widespread among Mogadishu residents. Mohammed Sahnoun, the representative of the UN Secretary-General in Somalia during UNOSOM I, reported that rumours of an attempted UN shut down of the station had reached him days before the incident. According to ambassador Oakley, Aidid saw the targeting of his SNA controlled station as specifically unfair on account of his main political rival Ali Mahdi also having a radio station that UNOSOM was not threatening, due to Mahdi's claim that it was private.

=== AWSS inspections ===
An agreement had been previously signed between the warring Somali factions and UNOSOM to store heavy weaponry in Authorized Weapons Storage Sites (AWSS), which was subject to UN inspections. The Radio Mogadishu compound coincidentally happened to be the site of AWSS 5. June 5th, 1993, was to be the first inspection of the AWSS.

On the afternoon of Friday June 4th, the day before the battle, UNOSOM notified General Aidid's headquarters that they were planning to inspect six of his arms storage sites. Notably only Aidid's faction, the Somali National Alliance (SNA) was to be inspected. The warning of the coming inspection was received by Aidid's lieutenant Abdi Qeybdiib Hassan Awale, as Aidid himself was not present to receive the warning with Friday being the Muslim day of Sabbath, and consequently he was off work. Awale protested that he was not authorized to accept such a notification, a claim which UNOSOM representatives rejected, and informed him that he was a recognized high official of the SNA. The visit was now considered as an official notification. Abdi Qeybdiib reportedly warned the UNOSOM envoys the notice was unacceptable and result in a war. This perceived slight greatly played into Aidid's growing fear that UNOSOM was attempting marginalize his authority in their effort to recreate the Somali state. A 1994 UN Commission of Inquiry concluded that the conflict had been set in motion by the decision to give Aidid the "ultimatum like" search notice.

The Pakistani commander cautioned American General Thomas Montgomery that the inspections would be highly politically sensitive and dangerous. Montgomery did not tell the Pakistanis about Abdi Qeybdiibs warning and the Pakistanis' claim if they had known about the objection they would have arrived better equipped. According to the 1994 United Nations Inquiry into the events leading up to the Battle of Mogadishu:

Opinions differ, even among UNOSOM officials, on whether the weapons inspections of 5 June 1993 was genuine or was merely a cover-up for reconnaissance and subsequent seizure of Radio Mogadishu

== Inspection and clashes ==
The particulars of what occurred, and who exactly initiated the clash is contested by UNOSOM and Somali accounts.

On the morning of Saturday June 5th 1993 an element of the Pakistani force in Somalia had been tasked with the inspection of site AWSS 5, which happened to be located at Aidid controlled Radio Mogadishu. The station was popular across the city, even among those who did not like Aidid or the Habr Gidr clan and concern that UNOSOM was coming to shut it down infuriated many citizens of Mogadishu. Two American special forces technicians, in plain clothes, had also been sent along with the Pakistani contingent in order to best determine how to best disable the station. Maj Tariq Mahmood, a soldier who was part of the operation noted that, "Entry into the area was smooth but soon thereafter a crowd began gathering outside the building. There was visible agitation against the Americans, accompanying B Company."

According to Pakistani accounts, the Somali guards at the station told the inspectors that there were no weapons present. The Americans special forces insisted and broke several locks with hammers, finding no weapons inside. According to Somali accounts, the UNOSOM troops also began damaging the FM Radio and removing the stations staff from the compound. The forced entry and alleged destruction of station infrastructure was broadcast to the city. News of the incident rapidly spread across Mogadishu and a crowd gathered outside.

=== Radio Mogadishu Clash ===
As the Pakistanis entered the station a crowd of Somalis had already been gathered in protest; throwing stones while yelling, "Go home UNOSOM! Go home!" and in response Pakistani peacekeepers opened fire into the air to ward off the growing angry mob. Following the broadcast of the news on UNOSOM's entry into the station the crowd rapidly grew in size.

At 10 ^{am} when the inspections were almost completed, fighting broke out in five different locations in the surrounding area. It is generally agreed that the fighting had begun after the killing of a Somali protester, though accounts dispute how they were killed. According to Pakistani accounts a Somali man had attempted to snatch a rifle from a soldier and was killed by the troops in the ensuing melee. Soon after the killing, fighting began rapidly spreading. At Radio Mogadishu, the Pakistanis quickly ran out of ammo and had to fend off grenade attacks using wooden planks as bats. UNOSOM officials claimed that militia mixed into the crowd had opened fire on the peacekeepers and initiated the battle at Radio Mogadishu. Somali accounts asserted that the Pakistanis at Radio Mogadishu had opened fire on the crowd first, leading to a response that initiated the battle.

"Then the soldiers lowered the muzzles of their guns and shot straight at people. I saw a young child of four and a girl about fifteen and a boy had been killed. I had not used my gun since the night at Villa Somalia (the night Somali dictator Siad Barre was driven from Mogadishu in 1991). I did not fight in the civil war, but now I ran to dig it up from where it was hidden." Account of Radio Mogadishu clash according to a young Somali named Abdiwele Ali in an interview with Mark Maren

The largest fight of the battle occurred about a mile from the stadium where the roughly 4,000 Pakistani troops in Mogadishu were stationed. Approximately 100 of them were driving back from the weapons inspections when they stopped to remove a roadblock and were ambushed by Somali militia. According to General Ikram that attackers were on both sides of the road, battling for two and a half hours with the Pakistanis, using heavy machine guns, rocket-propelled grenades and rocket launchers. According to Somali journalist Abdishakur Aadam, Islamist factions in Mogadishu were involved in the clash. He believed that religious groups outside of Aidid's Somali National Alliance played a significant role in the incident.

Italian forces were called for help, but the dispatched attack helicopters accidentally killed three of the Pakistanis, resulting in their prompt withdrawal from the battle. Armour support took hours to arrive.

=== Casualties ===
The fighting resulted in the death of 25 Pakistani soldiers and 16 to 35 Somalis according to hospital figures. 59 Pakistanis and 3 Americans were wounded. Aidid disputed the hospital figures, claiming 70 Somalis had been killed, many of whom were civilian. The severity of the Pakistani death toll is attributed to the lack of armored cars, as many of those killed were shot as they tried to leave their cars to take cover in nearby houses and behind walls.

== Reactions ==
=== Somali reaction ===
Many Somalis viewed the deployment of UNOSOM forces at Radio Mogadishu as a covert effort to shut down the station. This perspective was reinforced by Resolution 837, passed the next day, which called on UN forces to neutralize radio broadcasting systems. UNOSOM denied the Somali charge that they were attempting to seize the station. A UN inquiry concluded the next year that without investigation, blame for the attacks of 5 June was laid on the SNA.

At 7 pm on the same day of the clash, Aidid took to the airwaves and call on residents of Mogadishu to be calm and not shoot at UNOSOM forces unless they fired upon them first. He directly accused UNOSOM of attempting to take over the station and sabotaging grassroots Somali peace initiatives:

"Today we pray to Allah for those who died today, may Allah have mercy on them and to those who were wounded may they have a speedy recovery...they (UNOSOM leadership) are directly responsible for the events that happened today. God is my witness...I ask the Somali people to observe order."

The Somali National Alliance denied involvement in the attack that sparked the battle. Aidid asserted that the United Nations had a conflict of interest when judging an assault on its own forces and, therefore, demanded an unbiased commission to ascertain responsibility for the incident.

=== Pakistani reaction ===
In Pakistan, Qazi Hussain Ahmed, head of the party Jamiat Islami called for the total withdrawal of Pakistani troops following the attack, saying they were only serving the interests of US imperialism in Somalia.

On Sunday, 13 June 1993, an element of the Pakistani contingent of UNOSOM II opened fire with a machine gun onto a crowd of Somali protestors in Mogadishu for at least one full minute, killing at least 14 Somalis, including women and children, and wounding more than 50 others. On the following day 14 June, Doctors Without Borders responded to the killings with press release denouncing the excessive use of force by UNOSOM II troops. A few days after the shooting, US President Bill Clinton held a news conference in which he heavily criticized Aidid for his killing of UNOSOM soldiers but made no condemnation of the killings of Somali civilians at the hands of U.N. forces.

== UNSCR 837 and start UNOSOM II - SNA conflict ==
=== Resolution 837 ===
The following day on 6 June 1993, the UN Security Council passed Resolution 837, calling for the arrest and prosecution of the persons responsible for the death and wounding of the peacekeepers. The Pakistanis, who had proposed the resolution, originally directly named Aidid in it, but was removed by the Americans and others who cited inadequate evidence. Instead the Americans pushed to identify the SNA according to U.S. Special Envoy to Somalia Robert B. Oakley. The Somali National Alliance was consequently directly named, and became an enemy of UNOSOM. As the leader of the SNA, Aidid was still held accountable, although he was not captured.

Adm. Jonathan Howe, the United Nations envoy to Somalia heading UNOSOM II, announced on UN radio that a full investigation would be made into the affair, and appropriate steps taken against those responsible. It was soon after this that he put out the infamous $25,000 bounty on Aidid's head. The SNA countered with a $1,000,000 bounty on Howe.

Resolution 837 led to a state of war between the SNA and UNOSOM II.

=== UNOSOM II - SNA conflict ===
Following the passing of Resolution 837 UNOSOM II forces would begin making offensive strikes all over Mogadishu with AC-130 gunships and helicopters. On advice from the UN, all aid work in the city came to a swift halt as the military campaign against Aidid began. The UN proceeded to officially deal Aidid out of the Somali nation-building process. Following the attack on the Pakistanis, Johnathan Howe began to push Washington for more help in arresting Aidid, as he became convinced that apprehending him, trying him as a war criminal and removing Aidid from Somalia - would help abate the raging civil war.

UNOSOM began to greatly increase its firepower in Mogadishu and started making deliberate shows of force with Italian and American helicopters over the city. The American Quick Reaction Force, after having been split up into several different hot spots in Somalia, was entirely recalled to Mogadishu. On 17 June 1993, Aidid's compound was directly targeted by AC-130 gunships in retaliation and Radio Mogadishu itself was also destroyed.

Howe had also requested the deployment of Delta Force that June following the clash but was rejected by President Clinton. Howe had envisioned the small, secret Army unit dispatching small groups of well-trained soldiers who could mount a bloodless arrest of Aidid. Despite Clintons rejection, Delta began training for the operation early in the summer and commanders dispatched an assessment team to Somalia in June. They reported that Aidid could easily be grabbed off the street. Clinton finally agreed to Howes request following the deliberate killings of US troops in August 1993.

== 1994 UN Inquiry ==
The 1994 United Nations investigation into the UNOSOM - SNA conflict and 5 June 1993 would conclude that in absence of a "...more convincing explanation," it believed the Somali National Alliance was most likely behind the attack. Despite this, the commission noted that no evidence existed to back previous UNOSOM assertions that the attack had been pre-planned or pre-meditated by the SNA and further noted that the incident had likely been a spontaneous reaction.
