= Mogadishu Line =

Proposed distinction between military operations

The Mogadishu Line is the point at which foreign involvement in a conflict shifts from peacekeeping or diplomacy to combat operations. The term often comes about in reference to the reluctance of international actors to intervene militarily in another state for humanitarian reasons. This reluctance comes about from fears that meaningful political changes may not be achievable without military actions, but that the military actions would be at odds with the diplomatic or humanitarian purposes and may become a bloody debacle.

== Origin of term ==
The term was a reference to the external intervention in the Somali Civil War in which several opposing factions engaged in a struggle to seize control of Somalia. In April 1992, calls for action by UN Secretary-General Boutros Boutros-Ghali prompted the UN Security Council to approve the commencement of humanitarian operations into Somalia, which initially involved a small contingent of UN-approved troops (UNOSOM), followed in December by a US-dominated military force UNITAF. However, these humanitarian and nation-building efforts were stymied by the nation's various clans refusing to share power and the violent clashes which ensued.

In March 1993, the UN Security Council authorized a new mission, UNOSOM II, which was endowed with enforcement powers under Chapter VII of the UN Charter to establish a secure environment throughout Somalia. However, operations turned sour after the Battle of Mogadishu on October 3, 1993, when US forces attempted to launch an attack on the Olympic Hotel in search of Mohamed Farrah Aidid. The subsequent combat resulted in the deaths of 18 US soldiers and a further 83 casualties. After the battle, the bodies of several US casualties of the conflict were dragged through the streets of Mogadishu by crowds of local civilians and members of Aidid's Somali National Alliance.

After the disastrous battle, pressure immediately built for a withdrawal of US troops. US President Bill Clinton said in a few days later that "our mission from this day forward is to increase our strength, do our job, bring our soldiers out and bring them home." He announced that troops would be withdrawn by mid-1994.

== Usage ==
The concept of the Mogadishu Line became ingrained in international relations discourse after the Cold War. Fear of a repeat of the events in Somalia shaped US policy in subsequent years, with many commentators identifying the graphic consequences of the Battle of Mogadishu as the key reason behind the US failure to intervene in later conflicts such as the 1994 Rwandan Genocide. According to the former US deputy special envoy to Somalia, Walter Clarke, "The ghosts of Somalia continue to haunt US policy. Our lack of response in Rwanda was a fear of getting involved in something like a Somalia all over again."

Clinton also refused to mobilize US ground troops in fighting the Bosnian Serb Army in Bosnia and Herzegovina in 1995 and the Yugoslav Army in the Federal Republic of Yugoslavia (specifically, the province of Kosovo) in 1999.

In the 1990s, General Michael Rose, the head of the United Nations Protection Force, insisted that the United Nations would never "cross the Mogadishu Line." However, his replacement, Rupert Smith, came to the conclusion that the Protection Force's humanitarian mandate was insufficient.

In 2003, Keane stated that changes in US policy toward Liberia suggested that the Mogadishu Line had been "erased."
