= Banadir Hospital =

Hospital in Mogadishu, Benadir, Somalia

Banadir Maternity & Children hospital
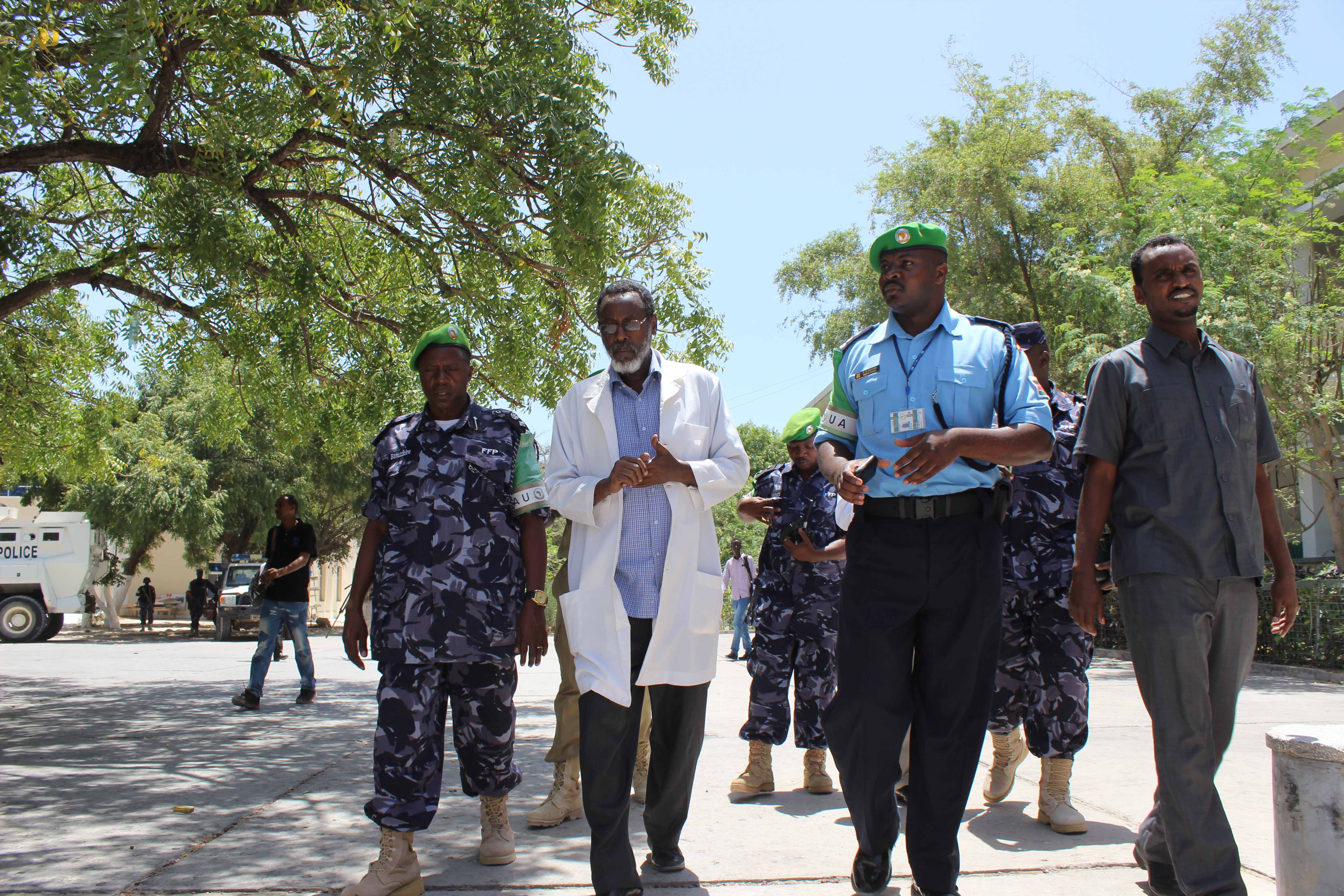

Geography
- Location: Mogadishu, Benadir, Somalia
- Coordinates: 2°2′4″N 45°17′55″E

Organisation
- Care system: Public
- Type: Teaching

Services
- Beds: 700

History
- Opened: 1977

Links
- Website: banadirhospital.com
- Lists: Hospitals in Somalia

The Banadir Maternity & Children Hospital (Somali: Isbitaalka Banaadir) is a teaching hospital in the Wadajir District (Medina) of Mogadishu, Somalia. Built in 1977 as part of a Chinese development project, it became the nexus of a humanitarian crisis in 2011. The hospital comprises a maternity unit and a pediatric unit.

Banadir Hospital is a public hospital located in Mogadishu, the capital of Somalia. It is the largest hospital in the country and serves as a referral center for patients from all over Somalia. The hospital offers a range of medical services, including surgery, obstetrics and gynecology, pediatrics, internal medicine, and orthopedics. It also has a laboratory and a pharmacy. The hospital has been providing essential healthcare to the Somali people for many years and has played a crucial role in addressing the healthcare needs of the country.

In Mogadishu and its surrounds, the Hospital serves roughly 3,000,000 people. The hospital’s perimeter (area) is 300m2, with 300m X 250m being constructed and 300m X 50 being left undeveloped. More than 3000 individuals use Banadir Hospital’s health services on a monthly basis since it is a referral hospital for the neediest members of society.
