= Jonathan Howe =

United States Navy admiral

Jonathan T. Howe
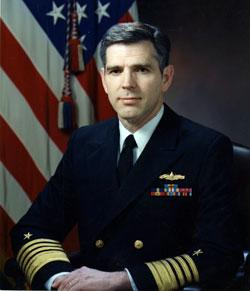

18th United States Deputy National Security Advisor
- In office November 7, 1991 – January 19, 1993
- President: George H. W. Bush
- Preceded by: Robert Gates
- Succeeded by: Sandy Berger

7th Director of the Bureau of Political-Military Affairs
- In office May 10, 1982 – July 1, 1984
- President: Ronald Reagan
- Preceded by: Richard Burt
- Succeeded by: John T. Chain Jr.

Personal details
- Born: August 24, 1935 (age 91) San Diego County, California, U.S.
- Education: United States Naval Academy (BS); Fletcher School of Law and Diplomacy (MA, PhD)

Military service
- Allegiance: United States
- Branch/service: United States Navy
- Years of service: 1957–1992
- Rank: Admiral
- Commands: Allied Forces Southern Europe; United States Naval Forces Europe; Cruiser-Destroyer Group Three; Destroyer Squadron 31; USS Berkeley (DDG-15)
- Awards: Defense Distinguished Service Medal (6); Navy Distinguished Service Medal (2); Defense Superior Service Medal; Legion of Merit (3)

Jonathan Trumbull Howe (born August 24, 1935) is a retired four-star United States Navy admiral. He was the Special Representative for Somalia to United Nations Secretary-General Boutros Boutros-Ghali from March 9, 1993, succeeding Ismat Kittani from Iraq, until his resignation in February 1994. During his time in Somalia he oversaw UNOSOM II operations including the 'Bloody Monday' raid which killed dozens and was a decisive turning point in the UNSOM II mission.

Howe was also the former Deputy National Security Advisor in the first Bush Administration. He was also President of The Arthur Vining Davis Foundations.

== Early life and education ==
Howe is a 1957 graduate of the United States Naval Academy at Annapolis, Maryland, and earned Master of Arts, Master of Arts in Law and Diplomacy, and Doctor of Philosophy degrees from the Fletcher School of Law and Diplomacy at Tufts University from 1968 to 1969.

== Naval and government service ==
Howe's naval career spanned nearly 36 years and included sea assignments and commands on nuclear submarines and surface warships.

He began his career with the U.S. Navy in 1958 assigned to the USS Bremerton.

Howe's early years in the Navy were spent in submarines.

He served from 1962 to 1964 as a nuclear engineer on the USS George Washington (SSBN-598), the first U.S. operational ballistic missile submarine. Following that assignment, he served as Engineering Officer on the USS Patrick Henry (SSBN-599) from 1965 to 1967.

Howe's naval surface ship commands included the USS Berkeley (DDG-15) (1974–1975), Destroyer Squadron 31 (1977–1978), and Cruiser-Destroyer Group Three (1984–1986) and aircraft carrier Battle Group Foxtrot.

Howe was Military Assistant to the Assistant to the President for National Security Affairs from 1969 to 1974. His contributions centered on military intelligence sharing and reinforcing the U.S.-China relationship during the Cold War. Howe accompanied Henry A. Kissinger on one of the Nixon administration's initial trips to China in October 1971. He also accompanied President Richard M. Nixon on the historic presidential visit to China in February 1972.

His other assignments include Assistant to the Vice President for National Security Affairs (1975–1977), Chief of Staff of the Seventh Fleet in Yokosuka, Japan (1978–1980), Senior Military Assistant to the Deputy Secretary of Defense from 1981 to 1982, Director of the State Department's Bureau of Political-Military Affairs from 1982 to 1984, deputy chairman, NATO Military Committee, Brussels, Belgium (1986–1987), and Assistant to the Chairman of the Joint Chiefs of Staff (1987–1989). He served simultaneously as Commander in Chief, Allied Forces Southern Europe in Naples, Italy, and Commander, United States Naval Forces Europe starting in May 1989. Following that assignment, he was named Deputy Assistant to the President for National Security Affairs by President George H. W. Bush in 1991, succeeding Robert M. Gates when he moved on to become CIA director. He retired from the United States Navy in 1992.

During his time as Deputy Assistant he was directly involved in the pursuit of President Manuel Noriega of Panama.

== Service in Somalia ==
In 1992, Howe was selected by the Clinton Administration to head UNOSOM II - the UN operation in Somalia that took over from the US in May. In this capacity he came under criticism for remaining physically distant from field operations and for his pursuit of Somali military leader Mohamed Farrah Aidid, which was called a "personal vendetta." The State Department and the NSC staff supported the strategy that removing Aideed would improve stability in the region.

On July 12, 1993, Howe oversaw the event Somalis call Bloody Monday. According to American war correspondent Scott Peterson a group of Somali elders had gathered at a house to discuss a way to make peace to end the violence between Somali militias and the UN forces. The gathering had been publicized as a peace gathering in Somali newspapers the day before the attack. After being tipped off by an undercover operative, American Cobra attack helicopters launched TOW missiles and 20 mm caliber cannon fire at the structure. According to a Somali survivor, American ground troops killed 15 survivors at close range with pistols, a charge American commanders deny. According to the International Committee of the Red Cross there were over 200 Somali casualties. Four Western journalists were killed at the scene by Somalis following the attacks.

Howe claimed that the mission took out a "very key terrorist planning cell" and that no civilians were killed. He stated, "We knew what we were hitting. It was well planned." The event is considered a turning point in the war as Somalis turned from wanting peace to wanting revenge, ultimately leading to the Black Hawk Down Incident. Human Rights Watch declared that the attack "looked like mass murder."

== Personal life ==
Howe is the author of the 1971 book Multicrises: Seapower and Global Politics in the Missile Age and the 2025 book Opportunity Lost or Mission Impossible?

Howe was chairman of the board of the World Affairs Council of Jacksonville from 2006 to 2012. The World Affairs Council of Jacksonville began its own Academic WorldQuest program in 2005, the Admiral Jonathan T. Howe Academic WorldQuest, which features a trivia-style six-round, ten-question competition.

He also served as chairman of the board of Fleet Landing, and was a past president of the Rotary Club of Jacksonville.

Admiral Howe was married to Dr. Harriet Mangrum Howe, whom he met in high school; her father, Richard C. Mangrum, was a U.S. Marine Corps general and served as Assistant Commandant of the Marine Corps. Howe's father, Hamilton W. Howe, was a US Navy Admiral awarded the Navy Cross for sinking a German U-boat in the Atlantic during World War II. Harriet was an assistant professor of sociology at the University of North Florida.

Admiral Howe has six children and currently resides in Florida.

== Awards and decorations ==
On January 13, 1993, after retirement, he received the National Security Medal.

- Navy Surface Warfare Officer insignia
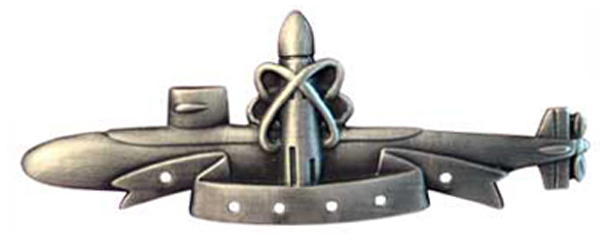
- Silver SSBN Deterrent Patrol insignia with six gold stars
- Defense Distinguished Service Medal with one silver oak leaf cluster
- Navy Distinguished Service Medal with one gold award star
- Defense Superior Service Medal
- Legion of Merit with two award stars
- National Security Medal
- National Defense Service Medal with two bronze service stars
- Navy Sea Service Deployment Ribbon with service star
- Navy and Marine Corps Overseas Service Ribbon

== Notes ==
Government offices
Preceded by Richard Burt	Director of the Bureau of Politico-Military Affairs; 1982–1984	Succeeded by John T. Chain Jr.
Legal offices
Preceded by Robert Gates	Deputy National Security Advisor; 1991–1993	Succeeded by Sandy Berger
