= Robert B. Oakley =

American diplomat (1931–2014)

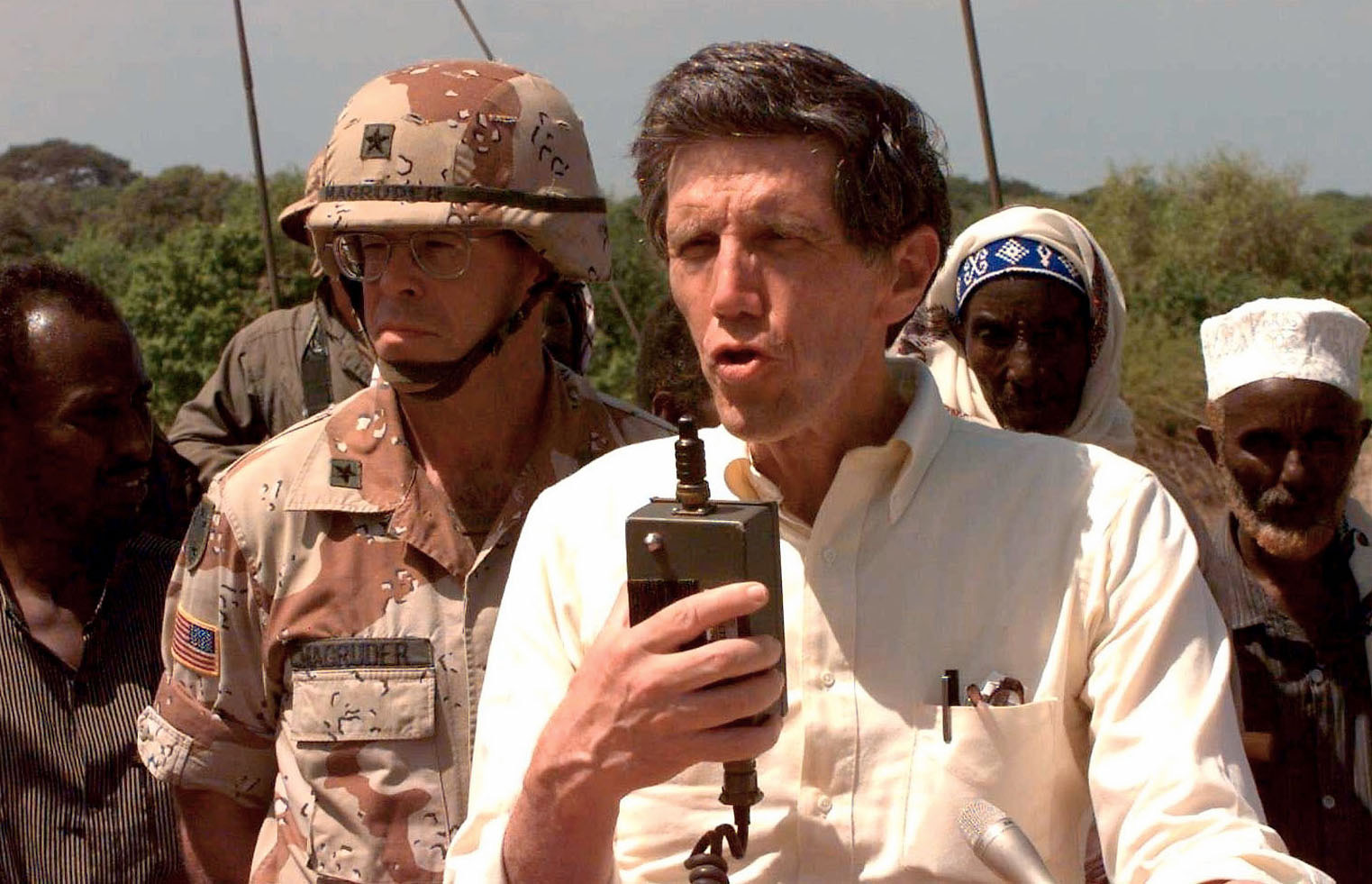
- Oakley in Somalia in 1993

19th U.S. Ambassador to Pakistan
- In office 18 August 1988 – 29 August 1991
- President: Ronald Reagan; George H. W. Bush
- Preceded by: Arnold Lewis Raphel
- Succeeded by: Nicholas Platt

U.S. Ambassador to Somalia
- In office 30 September 1982 – 12 August 1984
- President: Ronald Reagan
- Preceded by: Donald K. Petterson
- Succeeded by: Peter Bridges

U.S. Ambassador to Zaire
- In office 6 November 1979 – 22 August 1982
- President: Jimmy Carter; Ronald Reagan
- Preceded by: Walter L. Cutler
- Succeeded by: Peter Dalton Constable

5th Coordinator for Counterterrorism
- In office September 10, 1984 – October 12, 1986
- Preceded by: Robert M. Sayre
- Succeeded by: L. Paul Bremer

Personal details
- Born: Robert Bigger Oakley; March 12, 1931 Dallas, Texas, U.S.
- Died: December 10, 2014 (aged 83) McLean, Virginia, U.S.
- Party: Republican
- Spouse: Phyllis E. Oakley (m. 1958–2014) (his death)
- Education: South Kent School, Princeton University

Military service
- Branch/service: United States Navy

Robert Bigger Oakley (March 12, 1931 – December 10, 2014) was an American diplomat whose 34-year career (1957–1991) as a Foreign Service Officer included appointments as United States Ambassador to Zaire, Somalia, and Pakistan and, in the early 1990s, as a special envoy during the American involvement in Somalia.

== Department of State ==
Born in Dallas, Texas, Oakley graduated in 1948 from Connecticut's South Kent School and spent four years as an Intelligence Officer in the US Navy. He joined the Foreign Service in 1957 and was assigned to the Sudanese capital, Khartoum, in 1958. He first served in the Office of United Nations Political Affairs, Department of State, and later served in American embassies in Abidjan, Saigon, Paris, and Beirut. He also served at the U.S. Mission to the United Nations, and as Senior Director for Middle East and South Asia on the staff of the National Security Council.

In February 1977, he became Deputy to the Assistant Secretary of State for East Asia and Pacific Affairs. He became U.S. Ambassador to Zaire in November 1979 and U.S. Ambassador to Somalia in August 1982. In September 1984, he was appointed Director of the State Department Office of Combating Terrorism. He again joined the National Security Council Staff on January 1, 1987, as Assistant to the President for Middle East and South Asia.

He was named as U.S. Ambassador to Pakistan in August 1988, succeeding Arnold Lewis Raphel, who was killed in an August 17 airplane crash along with Pakistan's President, Muhammad Zia-ul-Haq. Oakley spent this role supporting Benazir Bhutto's new democratic government after the 1988 general election and coordinating operations between the Central Intelligence Agency and the Inter-Services Intelligence in the Afghanistan conflict. Following the Soviet withdrawal from Afghanistan, Oakley was involved in meetings regarding a planned takeover of the Afghan city of Jalalabad in what would become the failed Battle of Jalalabad in 1989. However, he also took office at a time when U.S.-Pakistan relations were becoming strained over the Pakistani nuclear weapons program, which Oakley believed was being used to force concessions from the United States, and a cut-off in U.S. aid to Pakistan because of the invocation of the Pressler Amendment.

After retiring from the Foreign Service in September 1991, Oakley became associated with the United States Institute of Peace. In December 1992, he was named by President George H. W. Bush as Special Envoy for Somalia, serving there with Operation Restore Hope until March 1993. In October 1993, he was again named as Special Envoy for Somalia by President Bill Clinton, and served in this capacity until March 1994.

== Later career ==
In January 1995, he joined the Institute for National Strategic Studies at the National Defense University; he later served as acting director of the institute and was a senior research fellow at the NDU.

In 2000, Oakley claimed in an interview with The Washington Post that the Clinton administration's "obsession with Osama" was making Bin Laden stronger. Following the September 11 attacks, he criticized American hesitance to take military action and the policy of "complete casualty avoidance" as empowering Bin Laden to orchestrate the attacks. Oakley also noted the withdrawals Lebanon in 1983 and Somalia in 1993 were seen as "signs of fundamental U.S. weakness in the face of casualties" from Bin Laden's perspective. In response, he advocated for missions that "involve getting our hands bloody, putting special operations units into action. People are going to get killed, on both sides. We know how to do it, and we have well-trained people who are willing and capable of these missions. Until now, all we have lacked is the will."

Oakley was also a commentator on Pakistan–United States relations during the 2000s. He felt sanctions imposed in 1990 were a "net minus" for inadvertently encouraging Pakistan to develop a nuclear weapons program and stoking anti-American sentiment.

== Recognitions ==
During his service with the State Department, Oakley received numerous State Department awards, including: the State Department Meritorious Honor Award, four Presidential Meritorious Service Awards, and the State Department Distinguished Honor Award. For his service as Special Envoy to Somalia, he received a second State Department Distinguished Honor Award and the Department of Defense Medal for Distinguished Public Service. On June 18, 1993, he received the Diplomatic Award for Excellence of the American Academy of Diplomacy. In October 2008, Oakley was awarded a Lifetime Achievement Award from Princeton in Africa.

== Family ==
In Cairo, during June 1958, Oakley married fellow Foreign Service Officer Phyllis Elliott who, under then-prevailing rules, was obliged to resign. The Oakleys have two children, and five grandchildren. Phyllis E. Oakley returned to the Foreign Service in 1974.

== Death ==
Oakley died in McLean, Virginia from complications from Parkinson's disease, on December 10, 2014, aged 83.

Diplomatic posts
Preceded by Walter L. Cutler	U.S. Ambassador to Zaire; 1979–1982	Succeeded by Peter Dalton Constable
Preceded by Donald K. Petterson	U.S. Ambassador to Somalia; 1982–1984	Succeeded by Peter Bridges
Preceded by Arnold Lewis Raphel	U.S. Ambassador to Pakistan; 1988–1991	Succeeded by Nicholas Platt
