= Scott Peterson (writer) =

American author/photo-journalist (born c.1966)

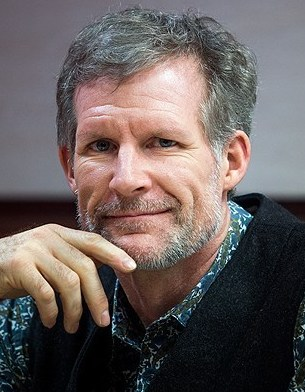
- Born: Scott Daniel Peterson c. 1966 (age 59–60)
- Occupations: Author, journalist

Scott Daniel Peterson (born c. 1966) is an American author and journalist. He graduated from Yale University in 1988 with a degree in English and was a member of Manuscript Society in his senior year. He was a Middle East correspondent for the Daily Telegraph. In 2000 he became a staff writer for The Christian Science Monitor, with his first posting as Moscow bureau chief. His first book, Me Against My Brother: At War in Somalia, Sudan and Rwanda (2001), is an account of his experiences and observations during a decade of reporting from Sub-Saharan Africa. His second book, Let the Swords Encircle Me: Iran—A Journey Behind the Headlines (2010), is based on more than thirty extended reporting trips to Iran.

== Career summary ==
Peterson worked for The Christian Science Monitor in Amman as Middle East correspondent with a focus on Iran issues. Later he was appointed Bureau Chief in Moscow by the same organisation, and then the equivalent post in Istanbul. He also worked as a photographer for Getty Images. His work across three continents spanning over two decades, reporting and photographing on "power and conflict" presented in coherent narratives, made him one of the most experienced and widely traveled foreign correspondents of his time. His extensive travels to Iran, visiting more than 30 times, informed his book, Let the Swords Encircle Me: Iran—A Journey Behind the Headlines (Simon & Schuster, Sept. 2010), concerning Iran's politics, history, and culture. The book was one of the "Best Books of 2010" according to Publishers Weekly.

During his career as a photo-journalist he has covered Algiers, Beirut, Russia and Central Asia. In 1999, he had to travel with the Taliban in Afghanistan. During his assignment in Iraq at the time of the Kurdish Revolt in 1991, he had to flee the country with more than a million Kurds when the resistance army was defeated at the hands of Saddam Hussein's forces.

In 2002, Scott's work in Northern Iraq won him the "Citation of Excellence" award from the Overseas Press Club of America. He also worked for The Daily Telegraph (London) covering the Former Yugoslavia on conflicts in Bosnia, Kosovo, and Serbia.

== Personal ==
Peterson completed his degree in English and East Asian Studies from Yale University. Apart from his work, he is very passionate about rock climbing and encourages his four children in the sport.

== Bibliography ==
=== Books ===
- Scott Peterson (2001). Me Against My Brother: At War in Somalia, Sudan and Rwanda. Routledge. ISBN 0-415-93063-4. — reviews:
  - Maass, Peter (August 27, 2000). "Review of Me Against My Brother: At War in Somalia, Sudan and Rwanda". The Washington Post. Archived from the original on March 22, 2006.
  - Hammer, Joshua (May 2000). "Down in Africa". The Washington Monthly.
  - Purvis, Andrew (May 22, 2000). "The Somalia Syndrome". Time. Archived from the original on August 15, 2000.
  - Bowden, Mark (May 22, 2000). "African Atrocities and "The Rest of the World"". PolicyReview. Archived from the original on December 6, 2008.
- Scott Peterson (2010). Let the Swords Encircle Me: Iran--A Journey Behind the Headlines. Simon & Schuster. ISBN 978-1-4165-9728-5.
