= Baledogle Airfield =

Military air base in Somalia

- Lower Shabelle, Somalia
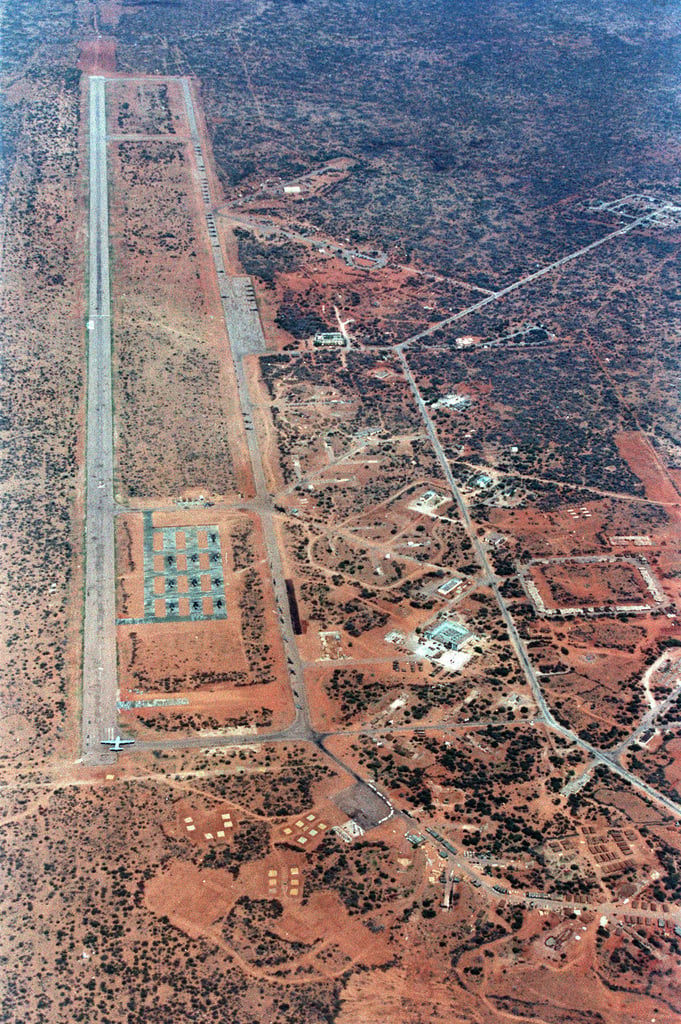

Site information
- Type: Air force base and special forces HQ

Location
- Location in Somalia
- Coordinates: 2°40′20″N 44°47′5″E

Airfield information
- Elevation: 298 ft (91 m) AMSL

Baledogle Airfield, also called Wanlaweyn Airstrip, is the largest military air base in Somalia, about 90 kilometers northwest of the capital, Mogadishu. The airfield was constructed in the 1970s for the Somali Air Force with assistance of the Soviet Union. It was later expanded on and modernized by the United States during the 2010s.

Baledogle Airfield has played a significant role in various conflicts and military operations in the region, as its strategic facilities and location have made it a key asset. Since the onset of the Somali Civil War in 1991, Baledogle Airfield has been host to factions and militaries including the Somali National Alliance, Somali National Front, the United States Armed Forces, UNOSOM II, the Islamic Courts Union, the Ethiopian National Defence Forces, Al-Shabaab, the African Union Mission to Somalia and the Somali National Army.

Several battles have occurred for control of the airfield since 1991, most recently in 2019. At present, it is primarily used by AUSSOM and the Somali Armed Forces as a base for conducting counterinsurgency and drone operations against Al-Shabaab fighters in the country. It also serves as the headquarters of the SNA's Danab Brigade.

== History ==
=== Post-independence ===
The air base was formerly known as 'Beledal Amin' and served as the Somali Air Force's largest airfield. Built in part by the Soviet Union, in 1975 the runway was lengthened to 10,500 feet and paved. In the 1990s it was noted that Baledogle possessed the second largest runway in Africa.

With the aid of the Soviet Armed Forces, a jump school was established at Baledogle when Somalia's first paratrooper unit was formed during the early 1970s. Somali National Army General Abdulkadir Sheikh Dini served as commander of the military training school on the base from 1982 to 1985.

=== Civil war ===
Several days before President Siad Barre's flight from Mogadishu in January 1991, the Somali Patriotic Movement, which was allied with the United Somali Congress, seized control of the airbase from the government. Following Barre's departure and retreat into southern Somalia, his remaining forces regrouped as the Somali National Front and successfully recaptured Baledogle in April 1992, positioning themselves to launch an offensive to reclaim Mogadishu.

==== United Nations intervention ====
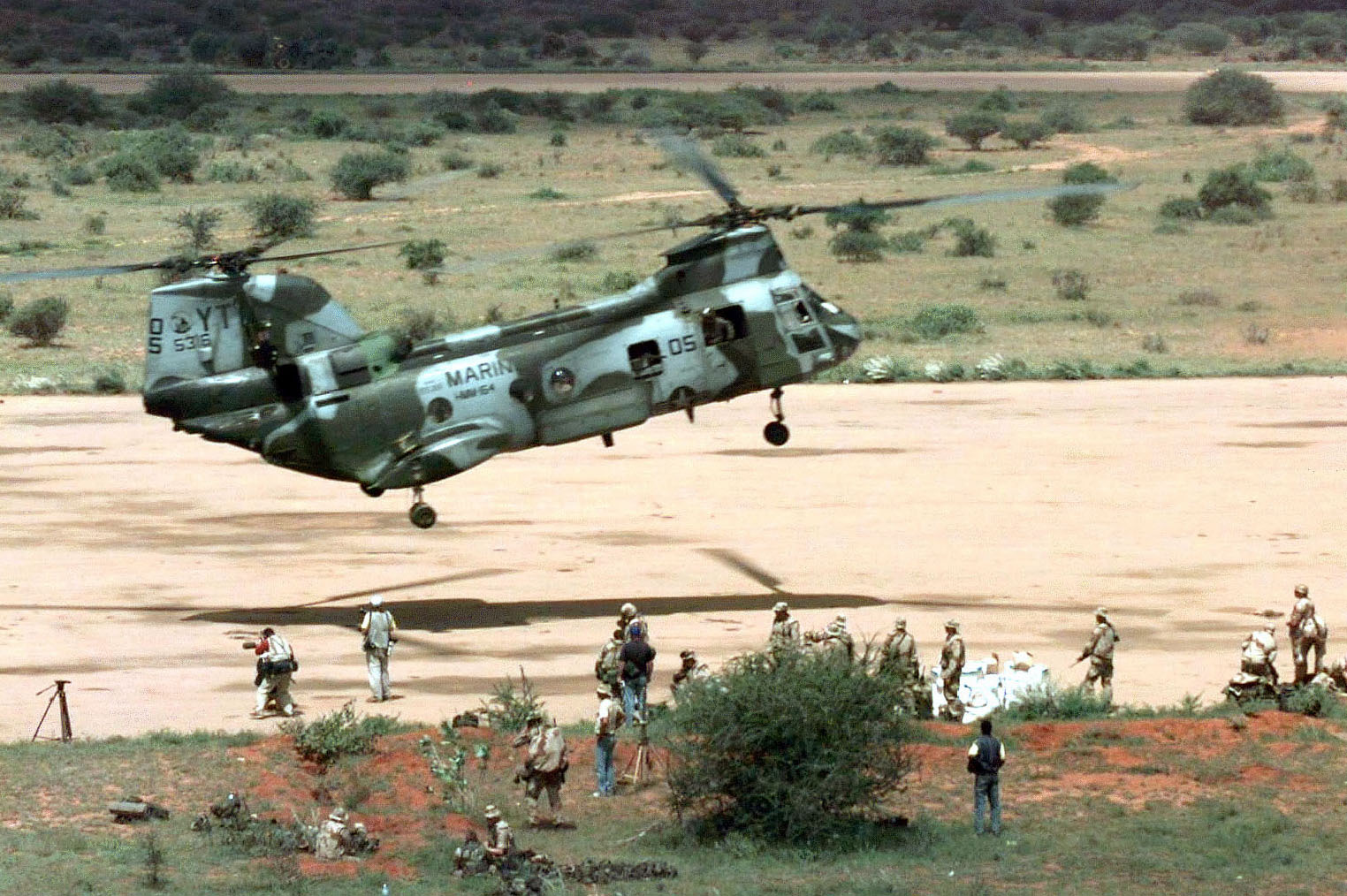
US forces with a CH-46E Sea Knight deploying to Baledogle on 13 December 1992

On 13 December 1992, four days after the deployment of U.S. military forces in Somalia, Baledogle airfield was peacefully secured by an air assault consisting of 450 soldiers of the 10th Mountain Division and 230 Marines, with the assistance of 12 AH-1W SuperCobra attack helicopters, UH-1N Twin Huey and CH-46E Sea Knight. U.S. forces proceeded to establish an operating base at the airfield to lead relief efforts in the area and further to south in the Kismayo, Beledweyne, and Merca humanitarian relief sectors. Baledogle had been designed for fighter aircraft and consequently had difficulty supporting a consistent large scale airlift. Transport aircraft like the C-141B Starlifter and C-130H Hercules were capable of landing at the airfield, but the repeated heavy touchdowns began to disintegrate the runway, eventually leading to the termination of C-141B operations in mid-January 1993.

During UNOSOM II, the airport was home to elements of the U.S. 10th Mountain Division. By January 1993 the entire HMLA-369 'Gunfighters' USMC attack helicopter squadron was deployed at the airfield. The HMLA-369 logged 1,098 flight hours from the base on various missions before being moved to Mogadishu international Airport the next month.

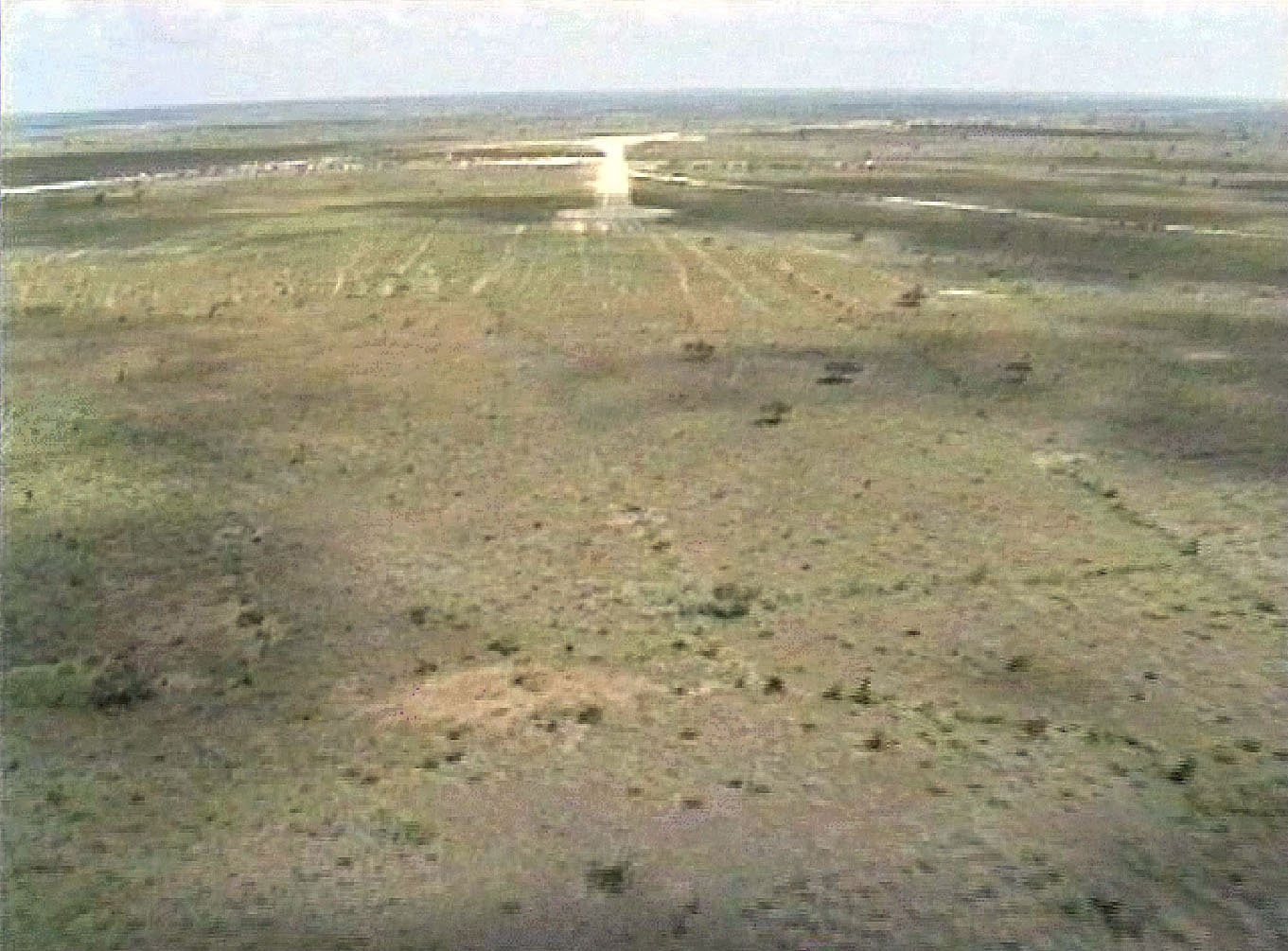
View of U.S. aircraft making an approach on the runway in 1992

==== Somali National Alliance control ====
Following the withdrawal of UN forces in 1995, the Somali National Alliance (SNA) led by Gen. Muhammad Farah Aidid took control of Baledogle Airfield. On 25 July 1996, the Somali Salvation Alliance (SSA) led by Aidids prime rival Ali Mahdi Muhammad and aided by a break away faction of the SNA led by Osman Ali Atto, seized control of the airbase. The ensuing battle resulted in 24 casualties, with seven deaths. Three days later on 28 July 1996, the SNA launched a counter-offensive and engaged in a four-hour battle to recapture the airfield. Following intense exchange of fire between the two sides, which involved the use RPG-7's, machine guns, and anti-aircraft missiles, the SNA successfully regained control of the base.

In January 1999, the Rahanweyn Resistance Army (RRA) accused Eritrea of carrying out an arms supply to SNA through flights using the airfield. According to a Central Intelligence Agency (CIA) report, on 7 March 1999, an aircraft containing a 15 man delegation consisting of four Iranians and four Libyans along with seven Iraqis landed at Baledogle Airfield to assess possible Uranium extractions in Somalia.

On 14 February 2001, a large Somali passenger aircraft landed at the airport for the first time. The plane, along with two other smaller ones, has just been bought by a local private company, Air Somalia. The large aircraft carried 160 passengers and be tasked with conducting international flights, while the two light planes were used for domestic flights.

==== Warlords and Islamic Courts Union ====
After the dissolution of the Somali National Alliance in 2002, Baledogle airfield came under the control of various warlords until 2006. The airfield received an average of nine aircraft a month and generated an estimated profit of $319,200 USD annually through landing and cargo fees. In October 2003, President Abdiqasim Salad Hassan of the Transitional National Government (TNG) became the target of an assassination attempt at the airport. CIA flights to the airport during the 2000s were used to fund and supply American proxies in Somalia.

The Islamic Courts Union (ICU) asserted control over the airbase during the summer of 2006. According to a United Nations (UN) arms-monitoring report, Eritrea had flown military supplies into the airfield to support the ICU. Iran had also reportedly used the airfield to deliver arms, and consequently the ICU used the base as a weapons stash. On 25 December 2006 the Ethiopian Air Force bombed ICU positions at the airfield. An Ethiopian foreign ministry spokesman justified the attack, "...because illegal flights were attempting to land there."

=== Conflict with Al-Shabaab (2007–present) ===
Following the collapse of the Islamic Courts Union government during the Ethiopian invasion, Baledogle Airfield became an important base for various factions and military organizations. The Ethiopian National Defence Force (ENDF), the Transitional Federal Government of Somalia (TFG), Al-Shabaab, the African Union Mission to Somalia (AMISOM) and the United States Africa Command (AFRICOM) have all operated from the airbase at different points in time post-2006.

==== ENDF and TFG ====
The Ethiopian National Defense Force created a base at Baledogle Airfield for the Transitional Federal Government of Somalia in early 2007. The ENDF trained up to 3,000 Somali government militia at the base. In May 2007, the TFG ambassador to Ethiopia privately asserted to US officials that the TFG had trained approximately 7,000 troops at the base.

During April 2007, Al-Shabaab forces under the direction of Mukhtar Robow formed a base at Bulo Marer in order to launch attacks on Baledogle.

On 25 January 2008, three Transitional Federal Government soldiers were killed when the airbase was briefly seized by Al-Shabaab. The insurgents looted the airbase for arms and ammunition during the incident. The next month two large contingents of troops deserted the base, including the entire 19th Battalion. On 7 July 2008, a battle between Islamic Courts insurgents and TFG militia occurred near the base. Fierce fighting was reported by locals living near the base between the Ethiopian military and insurgency the following month.

Later that year the TFG commander of the base, Colonel Ibrahim Hassan Isse, along twenty-six other military personnel resigned after publicly accusing TFG President Abdullahi Yusuf of being a foreign puppet. Commander Ibrahim stated at an interview on the base that, "The Somali Government is a slave of the Ethiopians and the so-called President is an old puppet," Following the incident, even more soldiers deployed to the area reportedly deserted. A UN report claimed that eyewitnesses had seen the TFG forces recruiting and training child soldiers at the base in 2008.

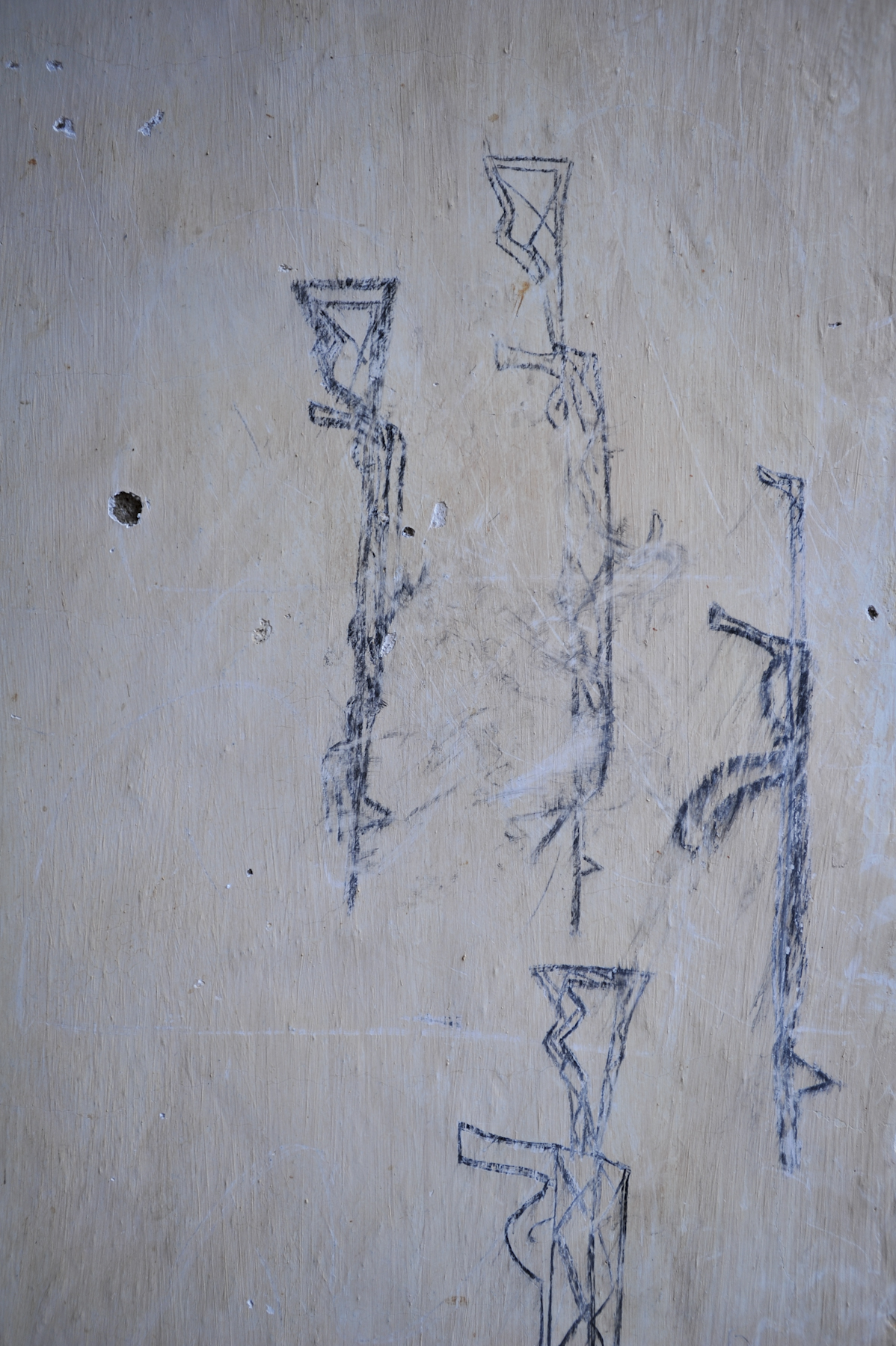
Graffiti on the base walls left behind by Al-Shabaab fighters

==== Al-Shabaab Control ====
By 2009 Al-Shabaab had completely seized control of the airfield and turned it into a training center. In June of that year Somali President Sharif Sheikh Ahmed privately urged the US government to carry out an airstrike on the base after claiming that Somali authorities had information that Chechen and Bosniak foreign fighters had been seen "living openly" there.

An anti-Shabaab Islamist group, the Ahlu Sunna Waljama'a (ASWJ), claimed that Al-Shabaab was importing a massive influx of arms through the airfield. The IGAD publicly called on the UN Security Council to enforce a no-fly zone over the airfield in order to cut off arms supplies to the militants.

Following the mass withdrawal from Mogadishu by Al-Shabaab forces on 6 August 2011, most senior foreign fighters in the organization flew south out of Balidogle to the strategic port city of Kismayo.

=== Capture by AMISOM and U.S. military deployment (2012–2026) ===
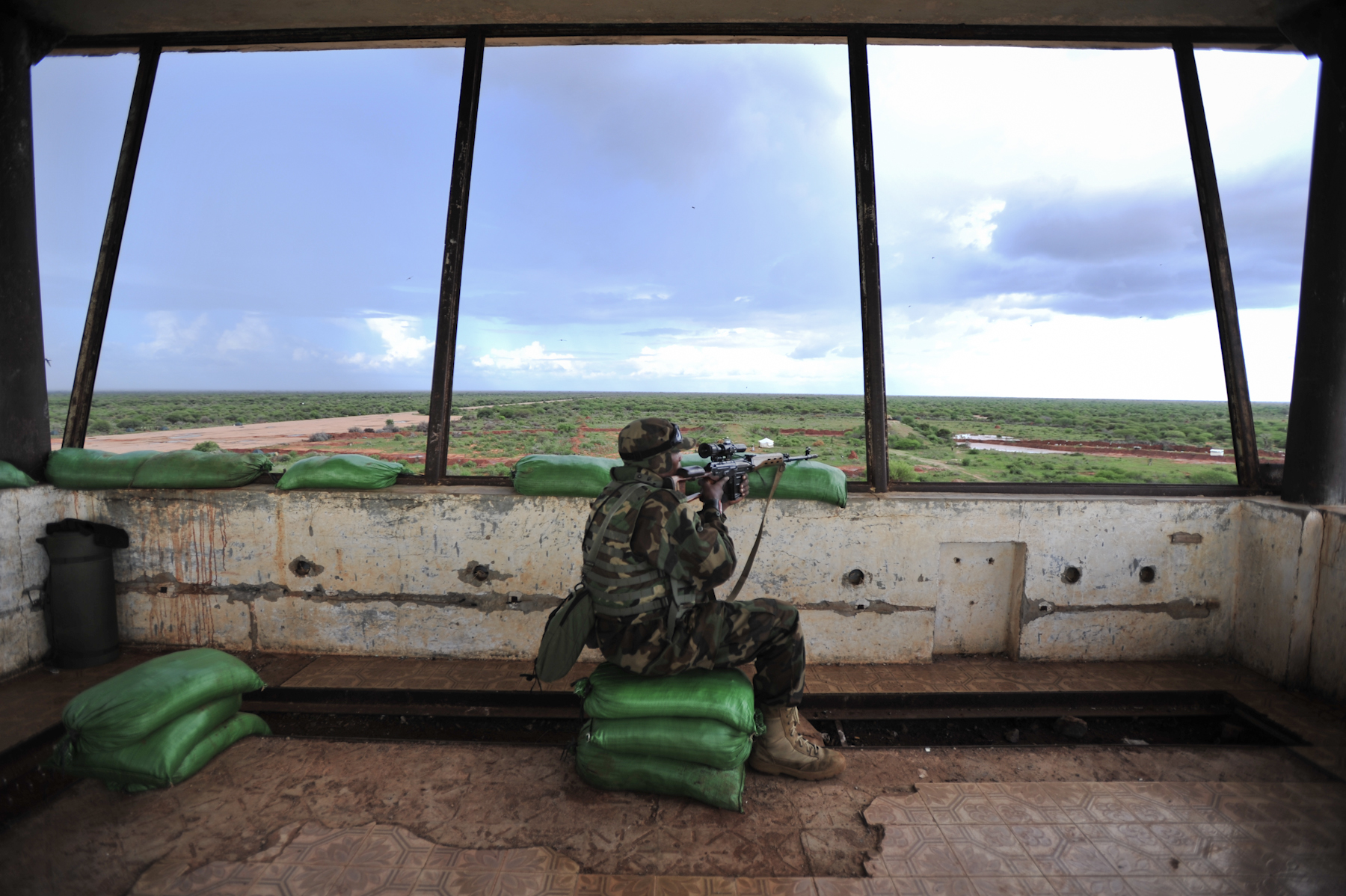
A Ugandan military sniper with AMISOM watches for Al-Shabaab militants from the control tower at Baledogle Airfield in 2012

In October 2012, AMISOM forces captured Baledogle Airfield from Al-Shabaab. The Uganda People's Defence Force (UPDF) AMISOM contingent was tasked with holding the Baledogle sector.

Following the capture of the base by AMISOM in 2012, U.S. forces in Somalia began operating from the airbase. Starting 2014, the Somali commando Danab Brigade was trained by the U.S. military and headquartered at Baledogle. JSOC was also reported to have started operating at the base sometime around 2016. The airfield is also host to a regular contingent of US Marines and a Special Forces team. In 2018 the U.S. Department of Defense gave out an over $12 million contract for emergency runway repairs at the base. According to the Air Force Times, new runway repairs appeared to be aimed at stepping up the capabilities of the airfield and possibly expanding the US military footprint in Somalia. Infrastructure at the airbase was expanded with 800 units constructed to accommodate American troops. The buildup coincided with an escalation by US forces in their fight against Al-Shabaab.

US Army engineers posing at the airfield entrance

==== September 2019 Al-Shabaab attack ====
Later referred to as "...the most formidable publicly known attacks on U.S forces in Somalia in 30 years", on 30 September 2019 Al-Shabaab militants attacked the base with car bombs and infantry. Troop "C", 1st Squadron, 102nd Cavalry Regiment, part of the New Jersey Army National Guard's Task Force Warrior, repelled a coordinated assault by al-Shabaab fighters. According to U.S. military officials, the militants had been repulsed without breaching the perimeter fence, and no casualties had been taken. Despite the successful defence, it was noted that the attack showed Al-Shabaab maintained a good intelligence network and possessed the capability to carry out complex operations.

==== AMISOM and U.S. aircraft deployments ====
In November 2019, preparations were made to ready the deployment of a UPDF aviation unit at the base. By December 2020 the Ugandan military aviation unit contingent had been deployed to Camp Baledogle. The aviation unit, comprising a crew of 140 personnel and 4 helicopters, brought the total of military aircraft to 7 of the 12 authorized for AMISOM.

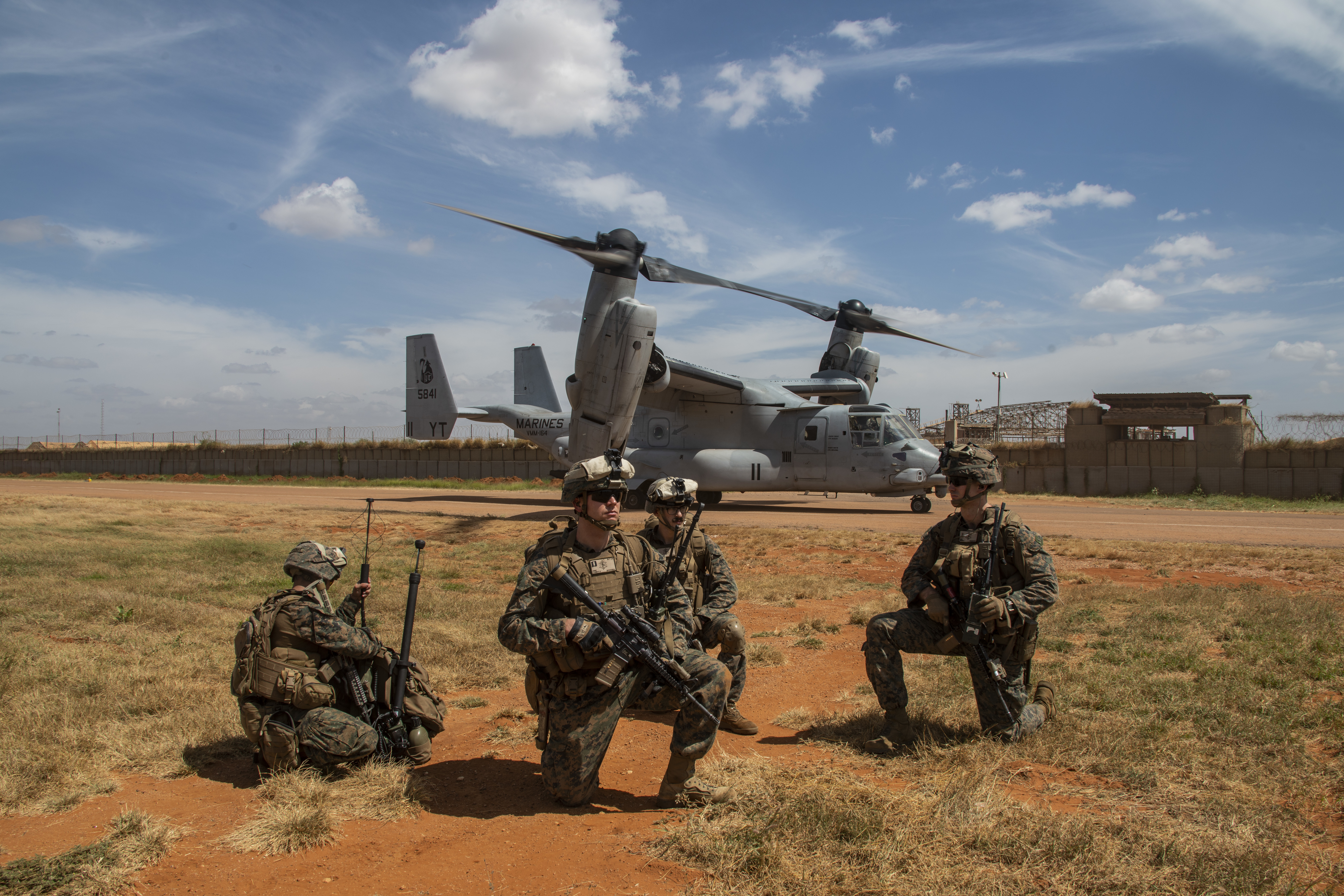
U.S. Marines with the 15th Marine Expeditionary Unit at Baledogle in 2020

The repositioning of US military forces out of Somalia in 2021 led to the release of previously rare pictures at Baledogle, including images of a secretive US "ghost" surveillance aircraft, referred to by its N27557 registration number. N27557 is a twin-engine Beechcraft King Air turboprop with the US civil registration. Crewed fixed-wing aircraft have previously operated from Baledogle since 2012 and have been primarily utilized for intelligence, surveillance, and reconnaissance missions. While N27557 is noted to lack any sensor turret, it does have a number of straight blade antennas underneath the fuselage of an unknown type sometimes associated with systems to intercept Al-Shabaab's communications, including from cell phones, or other kinds of signals intelligence.

In September 2022, Somali president Hassan Sheikh Mohamud arrived in Washington and discussed the possibility of escalating air raid operations by US marine forces from Baledogle with US Defence Secretary Lloyd J. Austin III.

A Ugandan People's Defence Force helicopter serving under the African Union was "negligently deployed" out of Baledogle and subsequently lost in a crash during late 2024. In 2026, several UPDF officers were facing charges for the loss of the vital aircraft.

Under the Trump Administration, the United States has continued to expand its military footprint at the airbase. In mid-2025 AFRICOM announced it was expanding housing and medical facilities. Baledogle was also further fortified by the Americans.

=== U.S. withdrawal and Turkish interest (2026) ===
During October 2026 it was reported that American troops withdrew from the airbase. The Turkish military has reportedly expressed interest in taking over Baledogle. AFRICOM's deputy commander, Lt. Gen. John Brennan, asserted that US forces had left because, “The surface of the airfield was declining to the point where it was becoming dangerous to land aircraft there.” Resurfacing the runway was considered to be too expensive.

On 30 October Turkish military officials visited the airbase. According to security officials plans for the new Turkish presence at Baledogle include the expansion of the runway and construction of new aircraft hangars. Presently the Somali National Army and the Ugandan People's Defense Force (under the auspices of AUSSOM) control the airfield.

== Facilities ==
The airfield has a single runway labelled as 04/22 that presently measures 10,500 feet long. The airfield now has six constructed hangars by the American support mission; it previously only had one, which had been destroyed during the civil war. There had been multiple sets of barracks to the north, east, south, and west of the runway, but those were abandoned and decomposed quickly after the start of the civil war.

In 2007 the airfield was assessed to have the capacity to serve aircraft as large as the C-130 or Boeing 727.
