= Factions in the Somali Civil War =

Groups since 1981

Over the course of the Somali Civil War, there have been many revolutionary movements and militia groups run by competing rebel leaders which have held de facto control over vast areas within Somalia.

== Prior to the fall of Siad Barre (through 1991) ==
=== Somali Salvation Democratic Front (SSDF) ===
First Somali resistance group.

- Leaders: Dr. Hassan Ali Mire, Abdullahi Yusuf Ahmed, General Mohamed Abshir Musa, Mohammed Abshir Waldo (General Secretary)
- Area of Operations: 1988: Mudug region in central Somalia and Nugaal and Bari regions in northeastern Somalia; 1991: northeast Somalia (Puntland)
- Tribal Affiliation: Majerteen and Darood clans
- Founded: 1978 by several army officers, it was the first of several opposition groups dedicated to ousting the authoritarian regime of Mohamed Siad Barre.

Took part in a 1982 Ethiopian border offensive against Somalia.

The SSDF also propped up and trained the SNM. Both SSDF and SNM leaders met in Ethiopia’s capital in September 1987 to unite and devise a plan to topple Siad Barre’s regime but they failed to agree on a common strategy.

=== Somali National Front (SNF) ===
The SNF was a political revolutionary movement and armed militia in Somalia. Initially made up of loyalists to former President of Somalia Siad Barre and the remnants of the Somali National Army forces after his ouster from office, the SNF's intent and goal was to recapture Mogadishu and reinstate Barre's regime.

- Leaders: General Ahmed Ali, Mohammed Said Samatar "Gacaliye", Ahmed Sheikh Ali Ahmed "Burale", Dr. Ali Nur, General Mohammed Hashi Gaani, General Ahmed Warsame Col Barre Hiiraale, Gen Omar Hagi Massale, Col. Abdirizak Issak Bihi.
- Area of Operations: Southern and Central Somalia; occasional forays to outskirts of Mogadishu and neighboring Regions.
- Tribal Affiliation: Marehan; & Ogaden Clans.::
- Founded: March 1991.:

=== Somali National Movement (SNM) ===
Flag of the Somali National Movement

- Leaders:
  - Ahmed Mohamed Gulaid 1981–1982
  - Sheikh Yusuf Ali Sh.Madar 1982–1983
  - Col. Abdiqadir Kosar Abdi 1983–1984
  - Ahmed M.Mahamoud Silanyo 1984-1990,
  - Abdirahman Ahmed Ali Tuur 1990-1991
- Area of Operations: Northwestern Somalia (Somaliland)
- Tribal Affiliation: Isaaq tribes.::
- Founded: 1981
- Founders. London; Riyadh..!!
  - Ahmad Mahammad Culaid,
  - Ahmed Ismail Abdi Duqsi,
  - Mohamed Hashi cilmi,
  - Hassan Aaddan wadaadiid
  - Hassan isse Jama
  - Prof Abdisalan Gabeyhadi

Isaaq tribe members had founded the movement in 1981 as emigres to London with the express purpose of overthrowing the Barre regime. They eventually moved to Addis Ababa, Ethiopia, and gained the support of the Ethiopian government.::

On January 2, 1982, operating near Berbera, the group attacked Mandera Prison to free political prisoners while simultaneously raiding Cadaadle armory.

Between 1985 and 1987, the SNM conducted many attacks on government facilities and troops based out of camps in Ethiopia.

By 1988, the SNM moved out of their camps in Ethiopia and began operating in northern Somali republic, the area now known as Somaliland. They even temporarily occupied the provincial capitals of Burao and Hargeysa.

They captured government Toyota Land Cruisers turned them into technicals by mounting 12.7 mm and 14.5 mm machineguns, 106 mm recoilless rifles, and BM-21 rocket launchers. They also operated various antiaircraft guns, such as the ZU-23-2.

By 1991, they had taken control of Hargeysa, Berbera, Burao, and Erigavo. On May 18, 1991, they declared the Republic of Somaliland.

=== Somali Patriotic Movement (SPM) ===
- Leaders: Colonel Shukri Weyrah Kariye, Colonel Bashir Bililiqo,

Colonel Ahmed Omar Jess, General Aden Abdullahi Nur ('Gabyow'), General Mohammed Said Hersi "Morgan"

- Area of Operations: Southern; Western Somalia.::
- Tribal Affiliation: Ogaden; Warsangale; &..:: (SPM 'Ogadeni') and Wardey (known as SPM 'Harti')
- Founded: 1989.::

Begun by a group of disaffected Ogadeni officers.

A key accomplishment was the seizure of Balli-Dogle air base in the days prior to Barre's flight from Mogadishu.

=== Somali Democratic Alliance (SDA) ===
- Leaders: Mohamed Farah Abdullahi, Mohamed Rashiid Sheekh also called sheekh malee, Zak Fergason, and Jamac Rabile(SDA)
- Area of Operations: Awdal, Somaliland
- Tribal Affiliation: Gadabursi; Warsangeli clans.
- Founded: 1989

Pro-Barre faction. Fought against other liberation movements during Barre's reign.

=== United Somali Congress (USC) ===
- Leaders: Dr. Omar M. Hassan, Gen, ciise maqadeye Hussein Ahmed Mohamed, Abdi Hilowle Hassan, Hassan Mohamud Moheddin, Hassan Omar Mohamed (Founders, 1989

Gen, ciise maqadeye Ali M. Osoble (Ali Wardhiigley) And Dr. Ismael Jimaale) (Mogadishu section founder, 1989); General Mohamed Farrah Aidid, Ali Mahdi Mohamed, Mohamed Qanyare Afrah (November 1991)

- Area of Operations: Greater Banaader Area (GBA) South Central Somalia
- Tribal Affiliation: Gorgaate Hawiye Clans & Tribes.::

(Habar Gidir, Xawaadle, duduble, and Abgaal Mudulod clans).::

- Founded: February 1, 1989 in Roma; Marseille; &.::

On January 26, 1991, the USC stormed the Presidential palace in Mogadishu, taking control of the capital and forcing Siad Barre into exile.

In November 1991, factionalism between Gen. Aidid and Ali Mahdi Mahammad caused a split in the USC. Mohamed Qanyare Afrah was chosen to be the Chairman of USC .

=== Somali Democratic Movement (SDM) ===
- Leaders:Maxamed Qanyare Afrah; M. Ali Dheere & (Leeqliqato); etc.
- Area of Operations: Greater Banaader ; Southern Somalia.:
- Tribal Affiliation: Ajrn; Dgdi; Shkhl; Mrsll K. & Sxll K..::
- Founded: April 1989

=== Al-Itihaad al-Islamiya (AIAI) ===
- Leaders:
- Hassan Dahir Aweys,
- Ali Warsame
- Hassan Abdullah Hersi al-Turki
- Area of Operations: Southwest (Ras Kamboni, Luuq)
- Religious Affiliations:Sunni Islam
- Founded: Late 1980s.

=== Southern Somali National Movement ===
- Clan affiliation: Biimaal

=== United Somali Root (USR) ===
- Founded 1991, represents Somali indigenous groups, non-violence organization
- Leaders: Mohammed Husen, Ex-parliamentary Somali Transitional Federal Government; TFG, died 2010 in Mogadisho,
- and General Mohammed Mohammud Hayd Ex-cabinet of President Dr.Abdiqasiman, and parliamentary
- an advocate of Somali indigenous clans.
- Tribal Affiliation: Muse clan and madhiban indigenous Somali clans.

== Founded after the fall of Siad Barre through to the UN interventions (1991–1995) ==
=== Somaliland ===
Leaders
1991–1993: Abdirahman Ahmed Ali Tuur
1993–2002: Ibrahim Egal
2002-2010: Dahir Riyale Kahin
2010-2017: Ahmed M. Mahamoud Silanyo
2017- current: Muse Bihi Abdi
Area of Operations
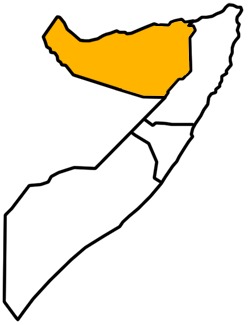
Somaliland
Tribal Affiliation
Isaaq
Dhulbahante

Dir

Dates
18 May 1991–Present
Flag

The Isaaq and Dhulbahante -dominated northern region of Somalia declared its independence in 1991, and has been recognzied by one UN member state

=== Somali National Alliance (SNA) ===
- Leaders: 1992-1996: Mohamed Farrah Aidid, Mohamed Nur Aliyou; 1996-2001: Hussein Mohamed Farah Aidid
- Area of Operations: Greater Banaader Area; Southern Somalia.
- Tribal affiliation: Habar Gidir; Ogaadeen; Duduble; Gugundhabe; Raxanweyn (Digil & Mirifle).::
- Founded: June 1992 - 2004/2005.:

Its constituents included Mohamed Aidid's breakaway United Somali Congress faction, the Somali Patriotic Movement, Southern Somali National Movement, and other southern factions. His son, Hussein Aidid, assumed leadership upon his death. The SNA became the core of the SRRC in 2001.::

=== Somali National Front (SNF) ===
- Leaders: General Siad Barre, General Mohammed Said Samatar, General Mohammed Hashi Gaani, General Ahmed Ali,'Gacaliye', General Omar Hagi Masallah, Dr. Ali Nur Mukhtar, Ahmed Sheikh Ali " Buraale ". Col. Abdirizak Isak Bihi, Mohamud Sayid.
- Area of Operations: Bay, Lower Shabelle, Middle Jubba and Lower Jubba regions; occasional forays to outskirts of Mogadishu
- Tribal Affiliation: Marehan (Mareehaan)
- Founded: March 1991

Loyalists to Siad Barre and Ahmed Ali, the remnants of his army forces founded the SNF militia after his ouster from office.

Their intent and goal was to recapture Mogadishu and reinstate the regime of Siad Barre, and to establish regional state in Middle Jubba, Gedo, Lower Jubba Regions.

=== United Somali Front (USF) ===
- Leaders: Abdurahman Dualeh Al;
- Area of Operations: Zeila, Somaliland
- Tribal Affiliation: Issa
- Founded: prior to 1991 as a small liberation movement. "New" USF founded Summer 1991

The original USF joined with the SNM in the creation of the Republic of Somaliland.

The Issa clan is a Somali clan that spreads across northwest Somaliland and the nation of Djibouti. The "new" USF especially sought to represent the interests of the Djibouti-based Iise.

=== Somali Africans Muke Organization (SAMO) ===
(also called Somali Asal Muki Organization)

- Leaders: Mohamed Ramadan Arbow
- Area of Operations: Southern Somalia.::
- Tribal Affiliation: Bantu
- Founded: 1993

Some of the tribes living the jubba and shabelle river banks

=== Somali National Democratic Union (SNDU) ===
- Leaders: Ali Ismael Abdi and Abdullahi Azari
- Area of Operations: Galgadud, Mudug, Burtinle-Nugaal
- Tribal Affiliation: Awrtable and Lelkase Darood sub-clans
- Founded: 1991
- Founding member of Puntland state, alongside the SSDF.
- Museum : Museum is available at Mudug.

=== Somali National Union (SNU) ===
- Leaders: Dr. Mohamed Ragis Mohamed
- Area of Operations:
- Tribal Affiliation: Reer Hamar; an Arabic ethnics, not Somali ethnics.::
- Founded: 1960s
- Ideology: Anti-Siad Barre
  Reer Hamar interests

A political party that was active in the 1960s but was forced into dissolution during the Barre regime. It revived after his downfall.

=== United Somali Party (USP) ===
- Leaders: Mohamed Abdi Hashi
- Area of Operations: Erigavo and Las Anod, Somalia
- Tribal Affiliation: Dhulbahante, Warsangeli, Gadabuursi (Samaroon).
- Founded: 1957 - 1969 (original group under Ali Garad Jama); 1991.::

The "new" USP had no affiliation to the original group founded in the 1950s. The new group that bore their name were generally pro-Siad, but key participants in the Reconciliation Conference of the Elders at Borama in early 1993.

== Those present at the 1993 Conference on National Reconciliation in Somalia ==
The 1993 Informal Preparatory Meeting on National Reconciliation and the Conference on National Reconciliation in Somalia saw the presence of no less than “15” separate factions.: including the offshoot SNA branches of USC and SPM. It was a plethora of acronyms: SAMO, SDA, SDM, SNA, SNDU, SNF, SNU, SPM, SPM-(SNA), SSDF, SSNM-(SNA), USC-(SNA), USC, USF, USP. Aidid's four SNA-aligned factions comprised a powerful bloc.::

The progressive tone of the proceedings was undercut by the actual lack of progress in the regions and on the streets of Mogadishu. In time, new factions emerged as the Somali Civil War entered a new phase: disintegration into independent and autonomous states.::

== Created after the departure of the UN Missions (1995–Present) ==
Faction	Tribal Affiliation	Dates	Flag
Puntland	Darood	1998–Present	
Jubaland under Juba Valley Alliance (JVA)	Darood	1999–Present	
Somalia Reconciliation and Restoration Council (SRRC)	Hawiye	2001–2004	
Southwestern Somalia	Rahanweyn	2002–2006	
Transitional Federal Government (TFG)	Darod, Dir, Hawiye and Rahanweyn 4.5	2004–present	
Islamic Courts Union (ICU)	Predominately Hawiye	2006–2007 (replaced by Al-Shabaab)	
Alliance for the Restoration of Peace and Counter-Terrorism (ARPCT)	Hawiye	2006	
Galmudug	Habar Gidir Hawiye and Marehan Darod	2006–present	
Popular Resistance Movement in the Land of the Two Migrations	Multi-clan	2007–present	
Maakhir	Warsangeli	2007-2008 (rejoined Puntland in January 2009)	
SSC movement	Dhulbahante, Darwiish clan	2008	
Al-Shabaab	Non Somali and Somali	2009	
Hizbul Islam	Non	2009–2010 and 2012–2014	
Islamic State	Hawiye and Majeerteen (Ali Suleiman)	2015	
