= 1992 famine in Somalia =

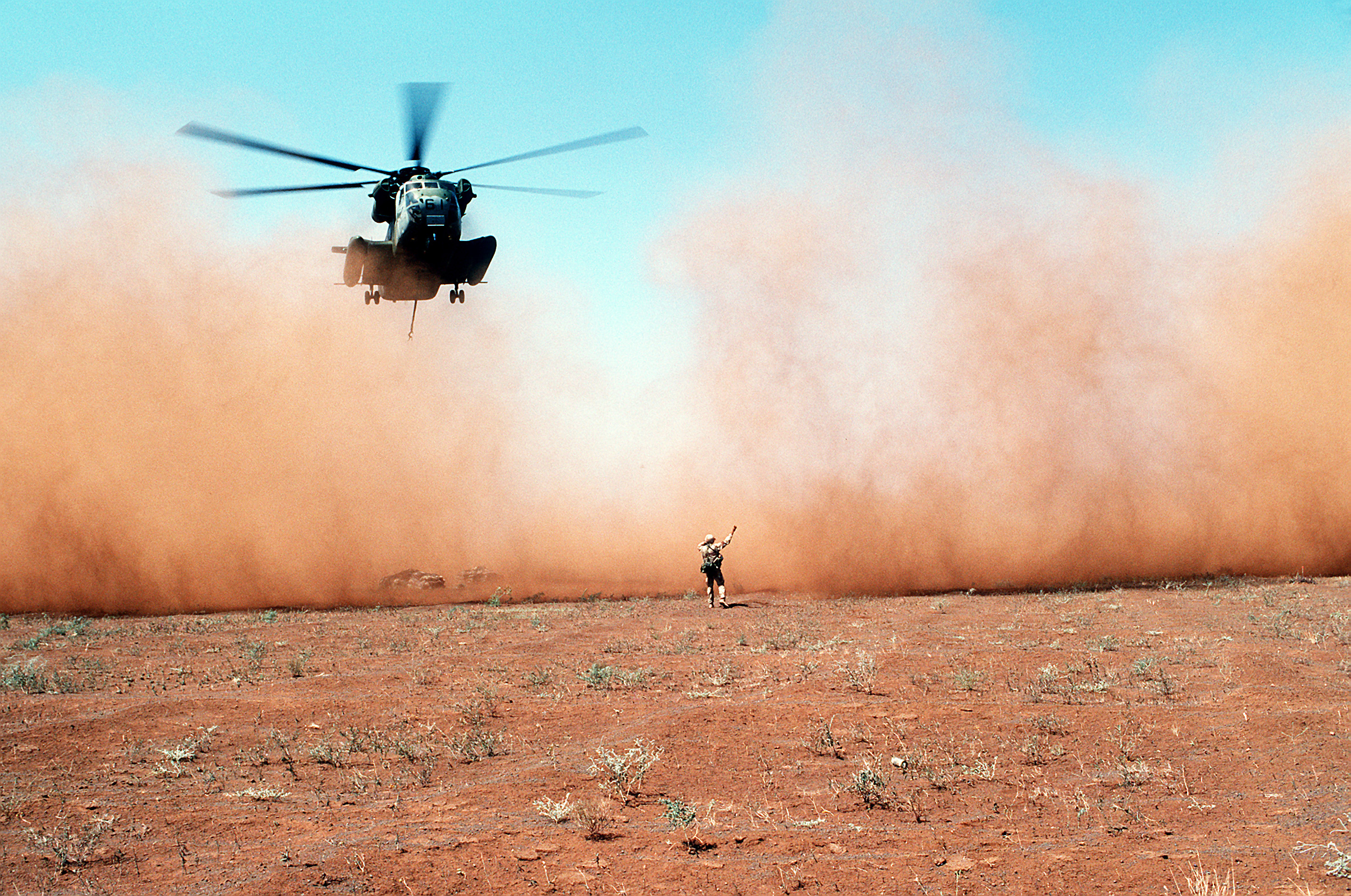
- US helicopter delivering a load of grain to the town of Maleel in Bay region, Somalia
- Location: Southern Somalia
- Period: 1991–1992
- Total deaths: Approx. 200,000 - 300,000
- Causes: War and drought
- Consequences: Creation of UNOSOM I
- Preceded by: Somali Civil War

The 1992 famine in Somalia resulted from a severe drought and devastation caused by warring factions in southern Somalia, primarily the Somali National Front, in the fertile inter-riverine breadbasket between the Jubba and Shebelle rivers. The resulting famine primarily affected residents living in the riverine area, predominantly in Bay Region, and those internally displaced by the civil war.

During the second half of 1992, the famine began to recede, partly due to the lull in fighting, which allowed the first crop harvest in the Lower Shebelle region, and also due to large-scale international food deliveries. Local Somali-led initiatives formed to address starvation were eventually overwhelmed, particularly in the Bay region. The crisis led to the creation of UNOSOM I in April 1992. The Red Cross took lead of the response, spending more than half of its 1992 budget on the crisis and distributing 75% of all relief in Somalia. From August to December 1992, the United States operated an aid airlift to the Red Cross that saved approximately 40,000 lives.

In December 1992, UNITAF (Operation Restore Hope) was established to succeed UNOSOM I, deploying over 30,000 US military-led troops to Somalia with the initial objective of providing security for relief groups. This had the effect of speeding the conclusion of the crisis by about a month. During early 1993, the famine was largely over. In March 1993, UNITAF transitioned to UNOSOM II. Of the approximately 100,000 lives saved as a result of various form of international assistance, 10,000–25,000 were during the UNITAF and UNOSOM II operations.

The crisis resulted in an estimated 200,000–300,000 deaths.

== Causes and contributing factors ==
Before the full outbreak of the Somali Civil War, food shortages had started during summer of 1990 in the last year of President Siad Barres rule. At the start of 1991, the formal economy collapsed following several years of decline as the Somali Democratic Republic was toppled by rebel groups. During 1991 and 1992 southern Somalia was struck by an exceptionally harsh drought. Concurrently, traditional coping methods broke down as the civil war spread into the south and law enforcement disintegrated. The largest contributing factor behind the famine was the devastation inflicted on infrastructure and farmland by warfare in the agricultural inter-riverine regions.

After former President Barre was ejected from Mogadishu by United Somali Congress (USC) forces in January 1991, his newly formed faction, the Somali National Front (SNF), withdrew far south of the city into the nations fertile breadbasket. Lacking supplies of their own to sustain themselves, Barres forces ravaged the grain stores of inter-riverine agricultural belt around the Jubba and Shebelle rivers. During this period SNF forces also destroyed pumps and farming equipment, resulting in a near complete halt to agriculture production. The Somali National Front is widely considered to bear primary responsibility for inducing the famine. This dire food supply situation was further exacerbated by the serious instability caused by fighting between the SNF and anti-Barre rebels over fertile regions, the most powerful of which was the Somali Liberation Army (an anti-Barre rebel coalition preceding the Somali National Alliance) led by General Mohamed Farah Aidid.

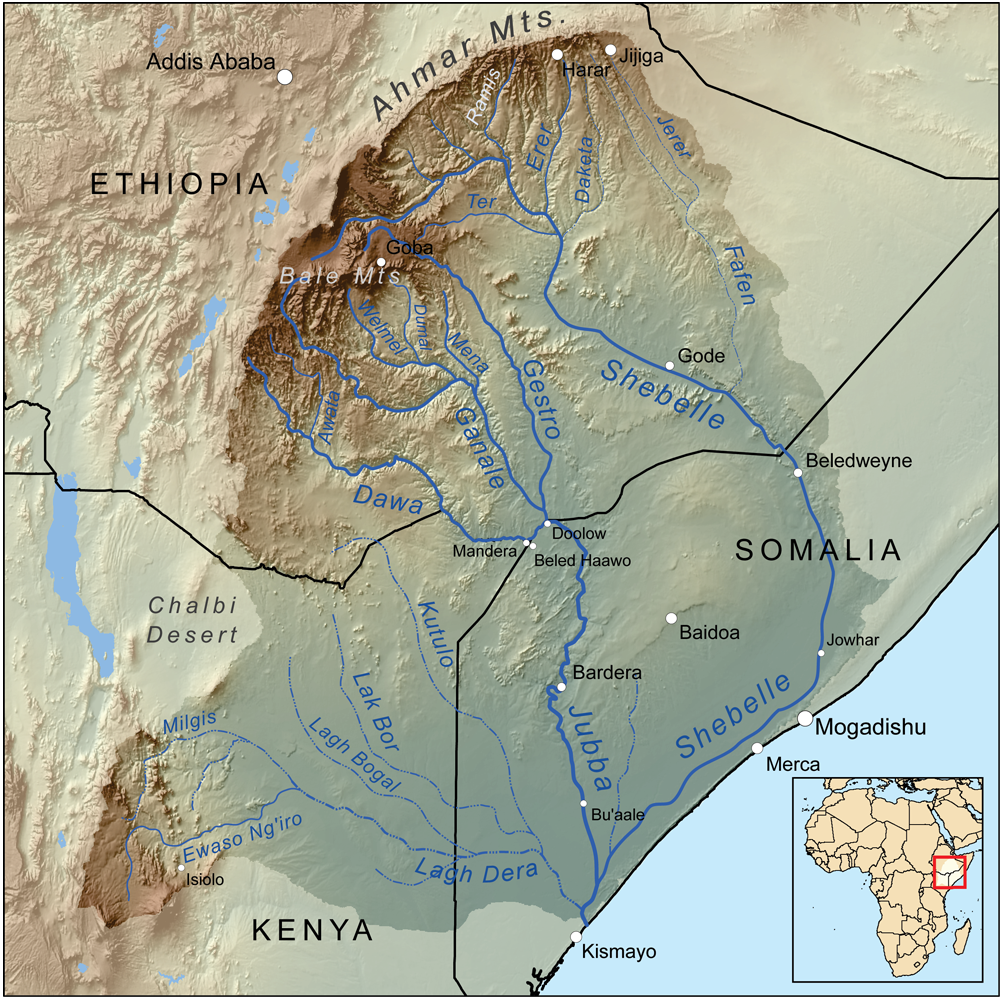
Jubba and Shabelle riverine area, site of major fighting in 1991 & 1992

== Famine ==
As agricultural production ceased, food prices skyrocketed across the south in mid-1991. In November later that year, major battles in Mogadishu and Kismayo closed the nations main ports. This led to the near disappearance of food from many markets across southern Somalia. Warnings of famine began around December 1991, but were largely ignored by the United Nations and relief agencies. In March 1992, the Red Cross declared Somalia the worlds "most urgent tragedy" and warned that thousands would begin dying within weeks. At the start of April 1992, General Aidids Somali Liberation Army coalition began its final major offensive to push the Somali National Front out of the southern regions. According to UNOSOM advisor John Drysdale:

The famine was a combination of drought and a seven-month military occupation of the area by three divisions of Siad Barre’s army. The former president had moved his headquarters from the Gedo region to Baidoa on September 15, 1991, to prepare for a military reoccupation of Mogadishu seven months later. Meanwhile, his soldiers plundered grain stores in this agricultural area, destroying pumps and implements in their wake. Farming came to a standstill. Barre’s army of occupation did not leave the area until April 22, 1992. On the road to Wanle Weyn it suffered its initial defeat at Aideed’s hands before retreating rapidly to the Kenya border. Its seven month occupation left villages upon villages of destitute farming communities. It took three months for the impact of growing mass starvation to hit the world’s television screens.

The famine was highly selective and affected primarily two groups: the inhabitants along the Jubba and Shebelle riverine area and internally displaced people, primarily in the Bay region. According to a Red Cross nutritional surveys, pastoralists and townspeople had near normal levels of nutrition while farmers along the rivers and those displaced in camps outside settlements by fighting were severely malnourished. Baidoa, capital of Bay region, became an epicenter of the famine and was referred to at the time as the "City of Death". During the first year the vast majority of aid distributed to the needy was from local community initiatives. Village committees, often centered around Mosques, established feeding centers and relief associations.

A principle killer during the famine was epidemic diseases such as measles and malaria. Journalist and aid worker Michael Maren challenged the United Nations' claim that 4.5 million people in Somalia were on the verge of starvation, and asserted that the figure was created with the intention of galvanizing an international response. According to Maren, this portrayal significantly overstated the crisis. His observations from the ground indicated that the famine was confined to specific areas, with the majority of Somalia's population remaining relatively unaffected. According to UNOSOM advisor John Drysdale, media portrayals of the crisis being nationwide were devoid of reality as only about 12% of the population had been affected by the famine.

== International response ==
While many local Somali community initiatives had formed to provide famine relief, they were soon overwhelmed by the scale of starvation sweeping Bay region. Consequently, an important factor in the suppression of starvation was large scale international food deliveries. According the independent Washington-based NGO Refugee Policy Group, approximately 100,000 lives were saved as a result of international assistance during the famine. The International Committee of the Red Cross (ICRC) distributed 75% of all food aid coming into Somalia, and managed the majority of all US based aid. The organization operated 400 kitchens across the country. It is believed that at its peak the ICRC provided some form of relief to over 2 million Somalis, feeding 600,000. For its efforts the ICRC was nominated for the Nobel Peace Prize.

=== Insecurity ===
In early 1992, as relief agencies initiated their operations, they encountered growing obstacles in delivering aid to the impacted inter-riverine region. The disintegration of Somali law enforcement paved the way for armed looters and criminals to steal food from storage sites and supply routes. In certain affected areas, armed banditry on these routes emerged as a significant concern. To safeguard their supplies, NGOs and relief agencies contracted Somali mercenaries or local fighters, often equipped with improvised combat vehicles, to escort their convoys. The term "Technicals" was coined by the accountants of these NGOs and relief agencies to categorize expenditures related to these unconventional security measures. Many of the thieves at Mogadishu's sea and airport, the primary supply hub, were associated with the rebel United Somali Congress forces of Ali Mahdi and Mohamed Farah Aidid, but effectively demobilized. With the looming threat of Barres troops reclaiming Mogadishu gone and the absence of financial support from militia leaders, both Aidid and Mahdi found themselves losing control over significant portions of their younger troops. Clan elders, too, had lost substantial influence over these forces. Consequently, many turned to stealing food both as a means of sustenance and as an income source.

=== UNOSOM I (April 1992 – December 1992) ===
In response to the security situation, UNOSOM I was to established in April 1992 to help facilitate the delivery of humanitarian aid for relief agencies. Mohamed Sahnoun, Special Representative of the Secretary-general for UNOSOM I, was tasked with forming and coordinating the UN's response. In May 1992 the first UN aid shipment arrived in Mogadishu. Sahnoun noted that due to disorganization and "bureaucratic haggling", UNOSOM food assistance in Somalia was slow and inadequate. Consequently, numerous independent relief agencies ventured into famine affected zones to provide relief, as opposed to UN relief organizations who argued that insecurity precluded their presence. This was further compounded by serious organizational infighting between relief agencies in Somalia during the spring and summer of 1992. Specifically, the United Nations Development Programme (UNDP) displayed an overt unwillingness to collaborate with the United Nations Children's Fund (UNICEF), and the level of inter-agency rivalry escalated to such an extent that they confiscated each other's photocopiers. Only at the end of August 1992 was the first meeting held to coordinate UN agencies in Somalia. Sahnoun later criticized aid agencies for overwhelmingly focusing aid on Mogadishu when starvation in the country was elsewhere.

==== Famine recedes ====
During the second half of 1992 the famine largely began to recede. Food prices across the country dropped dramatically from July to September 1992. The primary reason was that the lull in fighting in the south had allowed the first crop harvest in the Lower Shebelle region, which had proved to be surprisingly bountiful. In July 1992 the first UN troops landed in Somalia, seven Pakistanis under the command of Brigadier-General Imtiaz Shaheen. US aid airlifts to the Red Cross that began in August 1992 and gone on until December has been credited with saving around 40,000 lives. On 12 August 1992, Aidid's Somali National Alliance agreed to the deployment of 500 UN troops to ensure the security of aid workers, under the direction of Mohamed Sahnoun.

In August 1992, the famine started catching the attention of international media. By the time most international media had taken notice in the famine, the peak in mortality had largely already passed, though pockets of starvation in internally displaced people around Baidoa and Bardheere during September led to the apex of the famine with approximately 30,000 people dying that month. By October 1992, the situation in Baidoa had significantly improved without military intervention. Weekly death rates in the city had dropped from 1,700 in September to 300 by mid-November 1992. Bardheere experienced a large jump in deaths in mid-October after General Aidids forces pulled out and General Morgan occupied the city. According to Micheal Maren, "This temporary surge in death rates coincided with a huge international media attention that made all of Somalia seem like Bardera."

In the view of John Drysdale, the UN secretary-general's claim that starvation was a direct result of continuing insecurity in Somalia during late 1992 was, "...dubious in the extreme". By November 1992, largely owing to the mediation led by UNOSOM I head Mohamed Sahnoun, aid was flowing through the Mogadishu port unimpeded, with theft and banditry on the routes to famine zones averaging around 20%. However, within the same month, Sahnoun was compelled to resign due to disagreements with UN Secretary-General Boutros Ghali. He was succeeded by Ismat Kittani, who then claimed that 80% of all aid was stolen. This inflated figure has been disputed by other UNOSOM personnel, aid workers in Somalia and academics.

=== UNITAF and UNOSOM II (December 1992 – March 1995) ===
By the time of the large scale military intervention in December 1992, the famine had peaked and was in decline, though food insecurity was still in an issue. By November 1992, the food situation in Somalia had already improved dramatically, and mortality rates had fallen sharply. Rony Brauman, who was the president of Doctors Without Borders in 1992, criticized Secretary-General Ghali for improperly using the organization's data on IDPs. He accused Ghali of extrapolating this data to the entire Somali population, thereby exaggerating the extent of the famine. Brauman observed that when the large international military coalition arrived in Somalia in December 1992, Somali-led convoys from Mogadishu, which were unprotected and delivered 400 tons of food, received minimal media coverage. In contrast, just 20 kilometers away, heavily armed US military aid convoys transporting only 20 tons of food were swarmed by hundreds of journalists and TV crews. The Somali convoys were observed to be markedly more cost-efficient in distributing Red Cross aid compared to the military counterparts.

By early 1993 food prices had fallen well below production costs and farmers in the riverine areas reported grain stores full from previous unsold harvests. Despite the significant improvement in mortality due to the resumption of agricultural production and international aid, death rates in southern Somalia were still above normal. According to the Refugee Policy Group NGO, approximately 10,000 of the 100,000 saved by foreign aid had been rescued following the deployment of U.S. and international troops during December 1992's Operation Restore Hope. A US government commissioned report aligns with these figures claiming an estimated 10,000-25,000 saved following the December 1992 intervention.

== Effect of looting ==
Estimates of the amount of food aid looted greatly vary, ranging from 10 to 80%.

The Red Cross, the primary distributor of aid in Somalia, claimed that 10-15% of food aid deliveries were "unaccounted losses", which is often wholly conflated with looting. Professor Alex de Waal noted this was an optimistic assessment and that the number was likely higher, but asserted that much of what was counted in the figure was not hijackings or robberies. A significant portion of the food considered under the umbrella of an "unaccounted loss" was actually given up through agreements between the ICRC and its 24,000 employees/subcontractors in Somalia, who were usually paid in food. When food was stolen it was often through non-violent means such as the registration of "ghost kitchens" or "ghost villages" that did not exist.

At its peak, the maximum figure of looting was somewhere under 50% of aid and according to the Red Cross, the majority eventually reached its intended destination. In October 1992 United Nations Special Representative to Somalia Mohamed Sahnoun estimated that the majority of deliveries had around 15% looted, but that the number increased to as much as 40% of higher quality items. In an interview with American war correspondent Scott Peterson Sahnoun commented on looting by militias stating, "We see that there is a limit to the authority of Aidid and others, though they do not want to confess their inability to control, their powerlessness," Rony Brauman asserted that diversions averaged around 20 to 30%, and were often 'grossly exaggerated'

Some UN World Food Programme and UNOSOM officials went as far to claim that 80% of all food aid shipments were being looted, a figure that has been heavily disputed. This number was later used by President George H. W. Bush to justify the deployment of US troops to Somalia in December 1992. The estimate was directly disputed by Pakistani Brigadier-General Imtiaz Shaheen (head of the first UN troop contingent to Somalia) in an interview with British journalist Mark Huband as Operation Restore Hope began in Mogadishu. General Shaheen claimed that the amount of aid being looted was being exaggerated in order justify expanding the scope of the operation and that estimates of 80% were completely fabricated.

== Death toll ==
The figure of those who died during the 1992 Somalia famine is more difficult to estimate than with most famines, largely due to the highly uneven impact of starvation and mass displacement from the civil war.

According to the BBC 220,000 Somalis died during the 1992 famine. This figure was reportedly surpassed by approximately 40,000 during the 2011 East Africa drought, which primarily affected the same region and communities as the 1992 crisis.

== See also ==
- 1983–1985 famine in Ethiopia
- 2011 East Africa Drought
