= Yusuf Tallan =

Somali Army general

General Yusuf Tallan
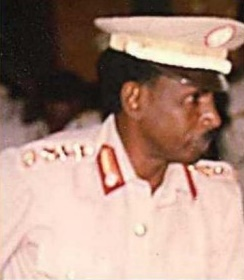
- Military career
- Allegiance: Federal Government of Somalia
- Branch: Somali National Army
- Rank: General
- Nickname: Tallan
- Commands: Chief of Army

General Talan or General Yuusuf Talan or just Yuusuf Talan, (Somali: General Yusuf Tallan, Arabic: جنرال يوسف تلن), was a General of the SNA, the Somali National Army.

== Biography ==
Talan was a native of the Awdal region of Somaliland and a member of the Musafin (Musafiin), Habr 'Affan (Habar Cafaan) section of the Gadabursi (Gadabuursi) clan. In his early years as career soldier who loved his profession. Trained at Sandhurst, Britain, he returned to the Somali Republic in the early sixties. He went through the ranks of the military till he reached the highest echelon of the Somali military hierarchy. A ceremony was held at the Center of the Military officers in Mogadishu to formalize it. The military officers there welcomed him with a five-minute standing ovation.

During the regime of Siad Barre he was a brigadier-general.

== Death ==
In October 2000 in Mogadishu, unidentified men shot and killed Yusuf Tallan, He was shot after he refused to get into a vehicle with the men. The killing was linked to warlord Osman Ali Atto because of Atto's business deals in the north and the possibility of a deal between Somaliland President Egal and Atto to destabilize the south. General Galal, chairman of the National Security Committee, was also linked to the killing; there was suspicion that he might have killed Tallan to prevent him from becoming head of the National Security Committee. Tallan had been named as the head of a committee to oversee the demobilization of the country's militias. In December 2000, the President of Somalia announced that the police had arrested Tallan's alleged killers with foreign assistance.
