= Somali National Alliance =

1992–2002 Somali politico-military faction

- Isbahaysiga Qaranka Soomaaliyeed
- Leaders: Mohamed Farrah Aidid; Osman Ali Atto; Hussein Farrah Aidid
- Founded: June 16, 1992; 34 years ago
- Dissolved: 2002; 24 years ago
- Split from: United Somali Congress
- Merged into: Somalia Reconciliation and Restoration Council
- Country: Somalia
- Headquarters: Mogadishu, Somalia
- Active regions: Greater Banaader Area
- Ideology: Hawiye interests Somali nationalism
- Status: Defunct
- Size: 4,000 (mid-1990s est.)

The Somali National Alliance (abbreviated SNA) was a major politico-military faction formed on 16 June 1992 by four different rebel groups that had been in opposition to the regime of former president Mohamed Siad Barre. The SNA was the first major inter-clan and inter-factional political alliance and was considered to be among the most powerful factions of the Somali Civil War. The alliance most notably faced off against the second phase of the United Nations Operation in Somalia (UNOSOM II) during the insurgency that emerged against foreign troops in the latter half of 1993.

Following the 1991 split in the United Somali Congress (USC) between Mohamed Farah Aidid and his primary rival Ali Mahdi Muhammad and the routing of Barre's forces out of Somalia and into Kenya during 1992, a tentative military coalition that had existed between different rebel organizations morphed into the politico-military organization known as the SNA. The alliance included Aidid's breakaway wing of the USC, the Somali Patriotic Movement (SPM), the Somali Southern National Movement (SSNM) and Somali Democratic Movement (SDM). The organization professed the goal of working toward forming a national reconciliation government and an eventual multi-party democracy.

The SNA later became part of the Somalia Reconciliation and Restoration Council (SRRC), formed in 2001, which was incorporated into the internationally recognized Transitional National Government in 2002.

== Background ==
=== Origins ===
During the mid to late 1980s various insurgencies of growing intensity began opposing the regime of Siad Barre that had ruled Somalia since 1969. Human rights abuses and atrocities by the regime during events such as the Mogadishu riots of July 1989 inflamed insurgency. Formed in 1987, the United Somali Congress (USC) led by Gen. Mohamed Farah Aidid, played a leading role in toppling the government in Mogadishu in January 1991. The USC split following a clash over the leadership of the new government between Aidid and Ali Mahdi Muhamed.

==== Somali Liberation Army coalition ====
Reports that former President Siad Barre's organization, the Somali National Front (SNF), was planning to retake Mogadishu led to the creation of a coalition consisting of four rebel groups: Aidid's wing of the United Somali Congress (USC), the Somali Patriotic Movement (SPM), the Somali Democratic Movement (SDM) and the Somali Southern National Movement (SSNM). On 17 April 1992 the Somali National Alliances short-lived predecessor, a military coalition known as the Somali Liberation Army (SLA), was formed. Brigadier General Mohamed Farah Aidid was elected chairman of the SLA that same day.

The coalition was created with the express goal of preventing Barre from retaking the capital and to further push the last remnants of his troops out of Somalia. Fierce back and forth fighting between SLA forces (led by General Aidid) and SNF forces loyal to President Barre in the fertile inter-riverine areas of southern Somalia consequently resulted in the devastating 1992 famine. Looting of grain stores in the region carried out by the Somali National Front prompted many Rahanweyn communities to begin joining the SNA during 1992. According to SNA accounts of the final clashes, SNF forces outnumbered the Somali Liberation Army coalition over six times, but were ambushed and encircled when they left their base in Baidoa and came within 50 km from Mogadishu. Following the defeat, Barre's forces were routed into southern Somalia until they were pushed out into Kenya by the SLA on 29 April 1992. According to the SLA, over 500 of Barre's troops were taken as prisoners of war and then turned over to the Red Cross.

On 14 May 1992, the SLA seized the strategically important southern port city of Kismayo, and three days later former President Barre fled to Nigeria. Early on in June 1992 the coalition publicly announced that it would never accept the deployment of foreign troops on Somali soil, but welcomed and requested humanitarian aid.

== Formation ==
=== Formation of Somali National Alliance ===
Following the defeat of Siad Barre's forces, on 16 June 1992 the SLA was phased out and the politico-military organization known as the Somali National Alliance was founded by the same four rebel groups of the SLA in the town of Bardere. The Somali Liberation Army instead morphed into the military wing of the newly founded SNA.

Primary clan composition of the SNA:

- USC Aidid faction: Habr Gidr, Xawadle, Duduble, Gaalje'el and Ogaden sub clans
- SPM: Ogaden and Majerteen
- SDM: Rahanweyn and Digil
- SSNM: Bimaal and southern Dir

The SNA was the first major inter-clan and inter-factional political alliance of the Somali Civil War. The organization professed the aim of working toward forming a national reconciliation government and an eventual multi-party democracy. Mohammed Farah Aidid was elected to serve as the first chairman and nominal leader of the SNA on 10 August 1992, but his ability to impose decisions on the organization was limited, as a council of elders held decision-making power for most significant issues. Osman Ali Atto served as the chief financier of the SNA.

Following the organizations creation, Aidid would strive to add the Isaaq-based Somali National Movement (SNM) and Darod based Somali Salvation Democratic Front (SSDF) to the SNA. If this goal were to be achieved, it would leave his prime rival Ali Mahdi as the only major remaining holdout to a unified national government. Aidid later claimed that the SNA was the only faction in Somalia that had "risen above clan and local loyalties."

=== Strength and equipment ===
Estimates of the strength of the SNA forces in Somalia ranged from around 5,000 to 10,000, with presumably 1,500 deployed in Mogadishu according to historian Stephen Biddle. Estimates of SNA numerical strength are complicated due to the addition of civilian volunteers or other part-time combatants who supplemented SNA forces in battles, particularly against UNOSOM II. The most probable count of full-time SNA fighters across the country was likely less than 5,000. Soon after its formation the organization was considered to be one of the most powerful factions involved in the Somali Civil War. Most of the SNA's military leadership was made up of former Somali National Army personnel, many of whom possessed combat experience.

Militia troops were primarily equipped with light infantry weaponry, like the AK-47 assault rifle. Experienced fighters supplemented the main forces with RPG-7 rocket-propelled grenade launchers, sniper rifles, mortars, land mines, recoilless rifles and machine guns.

== History ==
=== United Nations Intervention ===
In late July 1992 the alliance announced that they were creating a "joint administrative body" to make security arrangements in order to reduce banditry and that they further rejected recent proposals to send 500 UN troops to Somalia. Instead they appealed to the UN to aid the creation of a 6,000 man strong police service to maintain security and Aidid announced that he agreed with the deployment of 40 UN military observers to Mogadishu. That July the first contingent of UN troops arrived in Somalia.

In August 1992, Special Representative of the UN Secretary-General Mohammed Sahnoun successfully persuaded Aidid to enlarge the UN deployment. On 12 August, the Somali National Alliance signed an agreement allowing for the deployment of another 500 UN peacekeepers. However, as part of that agreement Sahnoun promised Aidid that any further deployments required the consent of SNA leadership. To the surprise of both the SNA and UN Special Representative Mohammed Sahnoun, Secretary-General Boutros Ghali announced in a 24 August report his intention to increase the size of UNOSOM from 500 to 3,500 and deploy the extra troops in four operational zones across the country. According to Professor Stephen Hill, Sahnoun knew the announcement, "...threatened to undo all his long worked for local support, because it had been made ‘without consulting the Somali leaders and community elders," Following Ghali's decision, Sahnoun attempted to have the deployment postponed until he could renegotiate with the SNA, which UN headquarters refused.

The large scale international military intervention in late 1992 mobilized nationalist opposition to foreign troops in Somalia, which contributed to a significant growth of support for the SNA, which loudly decried perceived UN colonial practices. John Drysdale, a prominent advisor hired by the UN for the operation, warned UNOSOM officials that Somalis would widely see a military deployment as gumeysi (foreign oppression) if it was perceived to be made without their sanction.

On 9 December 1992, under the newly established US led UNITAF military operation, American troops began landing on the Somali coastline at Mogadishu. Over 20,000 US troops were deployed. Mohamed Farah Aidid, leader of the Somali National Alliance (SNA), initially welcomed the operation, reportedly at the urging of his lieutenant Osman Atto, who had close ties to U.S. embassy officials in Nairobi and the American oil company Conoco. Aidid favored a US-led mission over a UN-led one, given his strained relationship with the UN Secretary-General Boutros-Ghali. This non-confrontational stance was reciprocated by the Americans who avoided trying to disarm Aidid's faction. UNITAF later transitioned into the more aggressive UNOSOM II which focused on nation building, and major disagreements between the UN and the Somali National Alliance began soon after the establishment of UNOSOM II, centering on the perceived true nature of the operations political mandate. In May 1993, relations between the SNA and UNOSOM rapidly deteriorated following two significant events.

==== Kismayo Incident ====
During the March Addis Ababa conference, the Somali National Front smuggled weapons into strategic port city of Kismayo. Although the city was nominally controlled by the SNA and UNITAF forces, Gen. Hersi Morgan of the SNF ousted the SNA forces in Kismayo led by Col. Omar Jess.

On 7 May 1993, three days after UNOSOM II took control of Kismayo from UNITAF, the SNA made an attempt to retake the city. During the assault the Belgian peacekeepers stationed in the town intervened, considering the assault to take Kismayo an attack on their positions and consequently repelled the SNA forces. The fall of Kismayo to Gen. Morgan infuriated the Somali National Alliance. To the SNA the incident was viewed as blatant U.N. partiality, as UNITAF had failed to prevent Morgan from seizing the city and UNOSOM had then fought SNA forces who had tried to retake it.

==== Galkayo peace accord ====
In early May, Gen. Aidid and Col. Abdullahi Yusuf of the Somali Salvation Democratic Front (SSDF) agreed to convene a peace conference for central Somalia. In light of recent conflict between the two, the initiative was seen a major step towards halting the Somali Civil War. Gen. Aidid, having initiated the talks with Col. Yusuf, considered himself the conference chair, setting the agenda. Beginning 9 May, elder delegations from their respective clans, Habr Gidr and Majerteen, met. While Aidid and Yusuf aimed for a central Somalia-focused conference, they clashed with UNOSOM, which aimed to include other regions and replace Aidid's chairmanship with ex-President Abdullah Osman, a staunch critic of Aidid. As the conference began, Aidid sought assistance from UNOSOM ambassador Lansana Kouyate, who proposed air transport for delegates and a 14-day accommodation. However, he was called back to New York and replaced by April Glaspie, following which UNOSOM retracted its offer. Aidid resorted to private aircraft to transport delegates. Following the aircraft incident, Aidid publicly rebuked the United Nations on Radio Mogadishu for interference in Somali internal affairs.

Aidid invited Special Representative of the Secretary-General for Somalia, Adm. Johnathan Howe to open the conference, which was refused. The differences between Aidid and the UN proved to be to great, and the conference proceeded without the United Nations participation. On the 2 June 1993 the conference between Gen. Aidid and Col. Abdullahi Yusuf successfully concluded. Admiral Howe was invited to witness the peace agreement, but again declined. The Galkacyo peace accord successfully ended large scale conflict in the Galgadud and Mudug regions of Somalia.

The contention between the Somali National Alliance and UNOSOM from this point forward began to manifest in anti-UNOSOM propaganda broadcast from SNA controlled Radio Mogadishu.

==== UNOSOM II – SNA conflict ====
Following the 5 June 1993 attack on the Pakistanis, the SNA and UNOSOM II engaged in a four month long war until the 3–4 October 1993 Battle of Mogadishu. The 5 June clash resulted in the deaths of 25 Pakistani army peacekeepers and consequently resulted in the passing of UNSCR 837 by the United Nations Security Council the following day. Directly naming the SNA, the resolution called for the arrest and punishment of those responsible for the attack, effectively creating a state of war between the SNA and UNOSOM II. General Mohamed Farah Aidid, as the leader of the SNA, emerged as a focal target. A manhunt, initiated by UNOSOM and later reinforced by US special forces, was launched to apprehend Aidid. However, he successfully managed to evade capture.

On 4 July 1993 the SNA demanded a UNOSOM withdrawal, asserting that the mission's mandate had shifted from a humanitarian venture to an American-led war in Somalia. The alliance further called for a negotiated settlement to end the conflict. The four month long conflict overturned much of the re-conciliatory process that had been made since the start of the intervention. A major turning point in UNOSOM and SNA fortunes came during the 12 July 1993 'Bloody Monday'. The raid had been conducted by the American Quick Reaction Force of UNOSOM II on what UN forces alleged to be an SNA command and control center. U.S. AH-1 Cobra helicopters killed up to 70 Somali clan elders and civilians, many of whom were reportedly not associated with Aidid. The raid has been noted for turning popular sentiment firmly against the intervention to the extent where, "even forces loyal to Ali Mahdi began to display open contempt for UNOSOM II." Following the raid the conflict escalated and by mid-July firefights between UNOSOM forces and SNA militia were occurring almost daily.

The SNA's strategy towards UNOSOM was primarily coercive as it lacked the ability to eliminate the heavily armed foreign presence. Consequently militia forces never seriously attempted to overrun UN bases or severe their supply lines. The chosen method to confront UNOSOM II was coercive pain infliction; by killing UN soldiers, the SNA aimed to impose cumulative costs on the UN, which would eventually compel a withdrawal. US Army Brig. General Ed Wheeler noted that during the conflict Gen. Aidid (a graduate of Russia's Frunze Military Academy) lectured his subordinate officers about the lessons of the Tet Offensive during the Vietnam War. In the view former professor of strategic studies and NSC director Jonathan Stevenson, the Americans failed to realize that the SNA was deliberately executing a military philosophy of attrition to achieve victory in spite of significant losses, much like the North Vietnamese guerrillas. He further noted that Vietnam and the UNOSOM conflict reflected strikingly similar kill ratios. Helicopter gunships used during the conflict, especially the AH-1 Cobra and AH-6 Little Bird, inflicted heavy losses on SNA forces.

Following the killing of American troops in Mogadishu with a remote control bomb in August 1993, the deployment of 'Task Force Ranger' under Operation Gothic Serpent was authorized by US President Bill Clinton to capture or kill Gen. Mohamed Farah Aidid and associated leadership within the SNA. The heavy-handed methods used in June and July by UNOSOM II, along with the commencement of Ranger and Delta raids within Mogadishu in August, alienated much of the Somali public. Biddle notes that on account of this, the SNA had little difficulty rallying and mobilizing public support to confront UNOSOM II and US forces. In September 1993, the major Arab newspaper Al-Hayat reported that numerous Islamic factions had joined the fight alongside the SNA after having initially distanced themselves from the war. According to Al-Hayat, independent sources in Mogadishu had confirmed that the majority of night military operations were being organized by an assortment of Somali Islamic groups present in the city during 1993. A major Somali Islamist militant organization, Al-Itihaad al-Islamiya, also began participating in the insurgency against UN forces in this period. Aidid did not publicly take direct credit for these night operations as the SNA generally did not participate, but reportedly made efforts to appear that he had directed them for propaganda purposes.

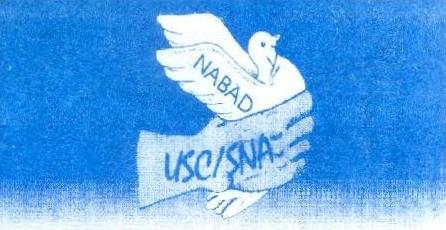
A UNOSOM II propaganda leaflet depicting a Somali National Alliance fist crushing a dove that spells "PEACE" in Somali

During the intervention the SNA repeatedly utilize anti-colonial, anti-imperialist and anti-American rhetoric in publications, statements and radio broadcasts:

"Chairman Mohamed Farah Aidid called on the Somali people never to accept the colonialist device of divide-and-rule being applied by the United States and UNOSOM to divide the Somali people and realize their imperialist ambitions. On the contrary, the Somali people have the right to self-determination. He went on to appeal to the U.S. Congress and people to stop Clinton killing the Somali people and opposing their unity and wishes, which is damaging the image of the American people, of human rights, and the cooperation between the Somali and American peoples. He called on them to work towards settling the matter peacefully and justly." —transcript of SNA broadcast 2nd of September 1993

===== Combat performance, tactics and capabilities =====
Brig. General Ed Wheeler and Lt. Colonel Craig Roberts from the US Army noted that SNA forces displayed remarkable fire and movement tactics in their six to eight-man squads during engagements against UNOSOM II forces, despite their general lack of marksmanship. The SNA's full-time fighters were noted to be adept at utilizing urban concealment. Often shooting came from building interiors or concealed rooftops in locations difficult to locate before hostile activity. An American soldier who participated in a major engagement with the militia noted that often the most one saw of a shooter was the barrel of their rifle and their head. Colonel R.D. Hooker, Jr., the Chief of Staff of the Army Chair at the National War College, expressed the belief that the capabilities of the SNA militia, along with the civilian irregulars who fought alongside them, were underappreciated by General William F. Garrison and his special operations staff officers at Task Force Ranger. Despite appearing poorly equipped and lacking discipline by American standards, many of the fighters had accrued years of combat experience while also demonstrating both determination and courage in numerous engagements with UNOSOM II well before the Battle of Mogadishu.

SNA militia were widely observed to have significant shortcomings in small-arms marksmanship, weak fire discipline, and poor heavy weapons maintenance. SNA ambushes on convoys were noted to be frequently initiated with premature fire at the lead UN vehicle, alerting the rest of the column to the attack before entering the kill zone. Significant amounts of SNA heavy weapons and armoured vehicles seized by the UN were discovered to be inoperable or in poor condition due to substandard maintenance and lack of parts.

While SNA militia did engage in guerrilla warfare against US/UN forces (short-duration firefights, hit and run tactics, ambushes, etc.), the SNA also committed its forces to numerous sustained engagements with UN forces during the conflict. According to historian Stephen Biddle, "for conventional armies, sustained firefights are expected; for guerrillas, they are not. Yet the SNA did sustain such firefights." He further noted that among the most notable of these sustained engagements in Mogadishu were:

- 17 June 1993 – Four hour engagement; UNOSOM forces withdraw following a firefight with SNA forces near Digfer Hospital in Mogadishu.
- 2 July 1993 – Four hour engagement; Italian UNOSOM commander negotiates a ceasefire with SNA to permit withdrawal after an ambush on Balad Road.
- 6 September 1993 – Three hour engagement; UNOSOM forces disengage following ambush on Nigerian contingent reliving Italian garrison in downtown.
- 9 September 1993 – Two hour engagement; SNA fighters and volunteers disengage after US attack helicopters come to aid ambushed US and Pakistani troops.
- 13 September 1993 – Two hour engagement; US QRF forces withdraw after fighting their way out of an ambush in Medina District.
- 3–4 October 1993 – Fourteen hour engagement; UNOSOM and US forces disengage from battle following extraction of Task Force Ranger from Bakaara Market. According to Biddle, the battle would have continued for even longer than 14 hours had their not been a withdrawal, noting that "it was the UN, not the SNA, that disengaged to end the fighting. The relief column that ultimately extracted TF Ranger had to fight its way into and out of the Bakaara Market; SNA fighters were resisting fiercely until UN forces crossed out of Aideed's zone of control and withdrew to their bases."

Significantly outgunned by UNOSOM II and Task Force Ranger, the militia resorted to innovative tactics that exposed US military weaknesses which were later heavily exploited by the Iraqi insurgency. Somali National Alliance tactics during the conflict inspired the Ba'athist paramilitary force Fedayeen and the Iraqi Republican Guard (especially regarding the use of technicals). SNA tactics during the conflict reportedly inspired the strategy and tactics various other Middle East state and non-state actors.

==== Post-Battle of Mogadishu and US/UN withdrawal ====
Two days after the Battle of Mogadishu, on 6 October 1993, President Bill Clinton ordered all US military forces in Somalia to cease actions against the Somali National Alliance, except in self defence. Clinton defended American policy in Somalia, but conceded that it had been a mistake for American forces to be drawn into the decision "to personalize the conflict" to Aidid. He went on to reappoint the former U.S. Special Envoy for Somalia Robert B. Oakley to signal his administrations return to focusing on political reconciliation.

The SNA perceived the cessation of American and UNOSOM military operations as a decisive victory. The stand down order given to US forces in Somalia led other UNOSOM II contingents to effectively avoid any confrontation with the SNA. This led to the majority of patrols in Mogadishu to cease and numerous checkpoints in SNA controlled territory to be abandoned. For the remainder of the operation UNOSOM troops withdrew into entrenched positions and practically disappeared from Mogadishu streets. The Somali National Alliance and other factions would retake full position of territory in the city that they had previously conceded. In the wake of a high-profile incident where crowds desecrated the bodies of several US troops killed during the battle, the SNA issued a public appeal on 7 October. Despite the "wanton destruction and suffering beyond human comprehension" inflicted by US and UN forces, the alliance urged respect towards the deceased, injured, and prisoners of war; in accordance with Islamic principles. Professor Mohamed Siad Issa, an SNA official, remarked in an interview with Dutch newspaper Algemeen Dagblad, "With regard to the dead pilot, we regret what happened. We are against desecrating the dead but we cannot stem the wrath of the people which has been caused by the appearance of UNOSOM."

On 16 November 1993, the United Nations Security Council instructed Secretary-General Boutros-Ghali to "suspend arrest actions" and announced the release of all SNA prisoners of war. The following day Mohamed Farah Aidid announced that the decision had proved that the Somali National Alliance had achieved a victory over the UN. According to SNA personnel, an estimated 900 fighters had died since the war had started in June. The U.S. Army flew Aidid to Addis Ababa on a military aircraft in December 1993 for peace talks. He arrived at the Mogadishu airport in an American armored vehicle guarded by American forces and his own Somali National Alliance before being flown to Ethiopia.

After the cessation of hostilities between the SNA and UNOSOM, Acting Special Representative Lansana Kouyate (replacing Adm. Johnathan Howe) successfully launched an initiative to normalize relations in March 1994. Numerous points of contention between the respective organizations were discussed at length and understandings were reached, facilitating the normalization of the relationship between the UN and the SNA. That same year the UNOSOM forces began withdrawing, completing the process by 1995. The withdrawal of UNOSOM forces weakened Aidids prominence within the SNA, as the war had served to unify the alliance around a common foreign enemy. UNOSOM II’s complete departure did not result in the eruption of violence that was widely predicted, though the civil war continued to simmer with occasional clashes between factions.

=== 1994 to 2002 ===
In January 1994, Aidid was re-elected as chairman by an SNA congress in Mogadishu attended by 200 high ranking officials of the alliance and was given a six month mandate. At the time the organization was noted to be the most powerful faction in the country.

By 1994 the two principal factions contending for power in southern Somalia were the SNA and Ali Mahdi's Somali Salvation Alliance (SSA), also known as the 'Group of 12'. An October 1994 Central Intelligence Agency report assessed that the governments of both Meles Zenawi in Ethiopia and Isaias Afwerki in Eritrea had decided to arm and support the SNA. It was believed that both nations had decided to help establish a Somali government with Aidid as president.

==== Aidid–Atto split ====
In 1994 the SNA suffered its first serious fracture when chief financier Osman Ali Atto and SNA forces loyal to him broke with the Aidid to ally with Ali Mahdi's SSA. That same year, the Somali National Movement (SNM) also suffered a serious fracture between President Ibrahim Egal of Somaliland and his predecessor Abdirahman Ahmed Ali Tuur. Tuur had allied himself with the Somali National Alliance and called for the reunification of Somaliland with Somalia. Fighting between the two factions broke out in Hargeisa in November 1994, which the forces of President Egal eventually won, ending Aidids aspirations of incorporating the SNM into an SNA government.

In April 1995 Osman Ali Atto announced Aidid's signature no longer represented the SNA. By June of that year Aidid was removed from chairmanship of the alliance during a vote conducted by the SNA congress, to be replaced by Atto. In response, later that same month Aidid declared himself President of Somalia prompting a joint statement from Ali Mahdi and Osman Atto condemning his declarations. Around this period the SNA found itself enter conflict with the Rahanweyn Resistance Army (RRA). Though the SNA had been previously composed of, and supported by Rahanweyn groups, they withdrew support following an invasion of Rahanweyn territory by the SNA. In May 1996, Huddur in the Bakool Region fell to SNA forces. The next month on 6 April the RRA drove out the SNA, claiming to have killed 3 at the loss of 2 of their own soldiers in the fight to retake the town.

On 25 July 1996, the Somali Salvation Alliance (SSA) led by Aidids prime rival Ali Mahdi Muhammad and aided by the break away faction led by Osman Ali Atto, seized control of the strategic Baledogle Airfield from SNA. Three days later on 28 July 1996, the SNA launched a counter-offensive and engaged in a four-hour battle to recapture the airfield. Following intense exchange of fire between the two sides, which involved the use RPG-7s, machine guns, and anti-aircraft missiles, the SNA successfully regained control of the base.

After the death of Gen. Mohammed Farah Aidid in 1996, his son, Hussein Mohamed Farah Aidid, was elected by an 80-member SNA cabinet and leadership council at Villa Somalia. Following Aidid's death, in 1997 the Cairo Accord was signed by major Somali factions, most notably between the SNA and Ali Mahdi's Somali Salvation Alliance (SSA). The accord collapsed following Ethiopian pressure on the SSA to pull out of the agreement after signing.

==== Merger with Somali Government ====
During reconciliation talks among Somali leaders in Kenya in December 2001, it was agreed that the Somali National Alliance would be folded into the Transitional National Government (TNG). The TNG proposed to the Transitional National Assembly that the number of cabinet members and parliamentarians be increased to make way for a broader-based government and on 20 January 2002, the assembly passed the motion.

== Foreign support ==
Beginning in 1993, the SNA received foreign diplomatic and material support from various African and Middle East states such as:

- South Africa
- Eritrea
- Ethiopia
- Sudan
- Uganda
- Iran

In early January 1995 Abdirahman Agaweyne, an SNA representative, reportedly travelled abroad in order to solicit support for the SNA from the Iranian government. He returned to Somalia that same month with two aircraft loaded with Iranian weaponry and equipment, most notably twenty-three shoulder-fired anti-aircraft weapons.

== Leaders of Somali National Alliance ==
Position	Name	Inaugurated	Left office	Notes
Chairman	Mohamed Farrah Aidid	1992	1995	
Chairman	Osman Ali Atto (1940–2013)	1995	1996	
Chairman	Hussein Mohamed Farah Aidid	1996	1999	
	Abdulkadir Mohamed Aden (1919–2002)	1999	1999	
	Abdullahi Yusuf Ahmed (1934–2012)	1999	2000	
	Aden Abdullahi Nur (1930–2002)	2000	2000	
	Mohamed Abshir Muse (acting) (b. 1926 – d. 2017)	August 2000	August 2000	
	Abdallah Derow Isaq (acting) (b. 1950 – d. 2006)	August 2000	22 August 2000	
	Abdiqasim Salad Hassan (b. 1941)	22 August 2000	2000	
	Abdinur Ahmed Darman	2000	2000	
Somalia Reconciliation and Restoration Council (SSRC) (counter-government, at Baidoa)
Chairman (rotating monthly)	Hussein Farrah Aidid	2000	2000	
	Hilowle Iman Omar (b. 1938? – d. 2010) USC	2000	2000	
	Hilowle Iimaan Cumar	2000	2000	
	Aden Abdullahi Nur	2000	2000	
	Hassan Mohammed Nur (b. 1946 – d. 2013) RRA	2000	2000	
	Xasan Maxamed Nuur	2001	2001	
	Abdullahi Sheikh Ismail	2001	2001	
	CabdillaahiSheekh Ismaaciil	2001	2001	

== Works cited ==
- Drysdale, John (1994). Whatever Happened to Somalia?: A tale of tragic blunders. Haan. ISBN 1874209510. OCLC 48195594
- Hirsch, John L.; Oakley, Robert B. (1995). Somalia and Operation Restore Hope: Reflections on Peacemaking and Peacekeeping. United States Institute of Peace Press. ISBN 1878379410.
- Day, Alan John (1996). Political parties of the world. Stockton. ISBN 1561591440.
- Mohammed, Mousa Sheikh (1998). Recolonization beyond Somalia. Somalia. OCLC 499185551.
- Campbell, John; Rengger, N. J. (1995). Treaties and alliances of the world. London, U.K.: Cartermill. ISBN 1860670210.
- Wheeler, BG. Ed; Roberts, LTC. Craig (2012). Doorway To Hell: Disaster in Somalia. London: Frontline Books. ISBN 9781848326804. OCLC 1224042096.
- Pouligny, Béatrice (2006). Peace operations seen from below : UN missions and local people. Bloomfield, CT: Kumarian Press. ISBN 1-56549-224-2. OCLC 64486263.
- Biddle, Stephen D. (2021). Nonstate warfare : The Military Methods of Guerillas, Warlords, and Militias. Princeton: Council on Foreign Relations. ISBN 978-0-691-20751-3. OCLC 1224042096.
