= Somali Patriotic Movement =

Political party and paramilitary group in Somalia

- Leader: Shukri Weyrah Kariye (1989 - 1996)
- Dates active: 1989 - 2004
- Groups: Darod; Kab-lalah; Ogaden
- Headquarters: Bu'ale (1989 - 1991); Kismayo (1991 - 1999); Dhobley (1999 - 2004)
- Active regions: Southern Somalia
- Ideology: Somali nationalism Darood interests
- Wars: Somali Civil War

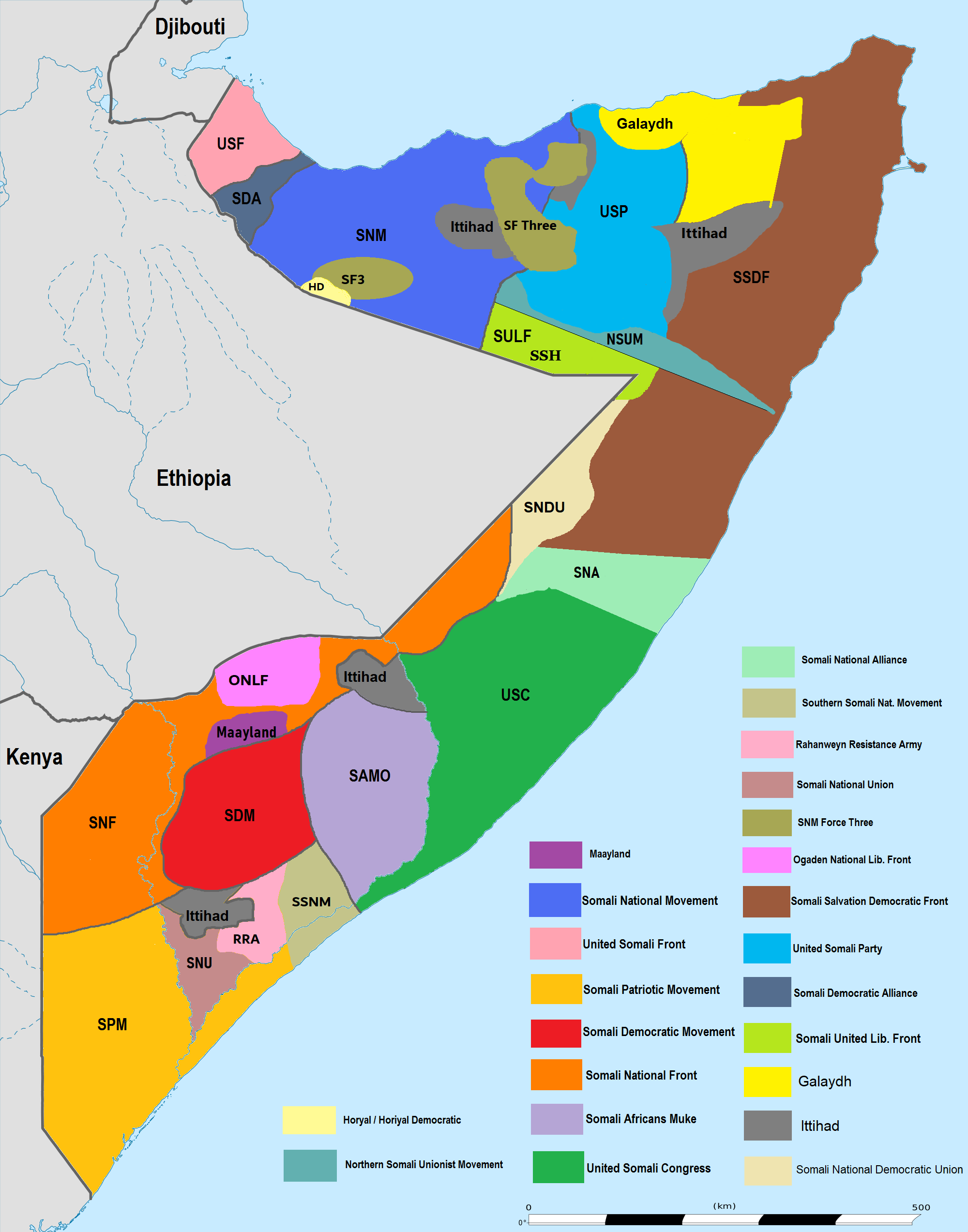
Areas controlled by the Somali Patriotic Movement and other military groups during the beginning of the Somali Civil War

Somali Patriotic Movement (SPM, Somali: Dhaqdhaqaaqa Wadaniga Soomaaliyeed, Arabic: الحركة الوطنية الصومالية) was a major Political and Military faction during the early years of the Somali Civil War. It was founded and commanded by Colonel Shukri Weyrah Kariye And Bashir Bililiqo, The group was based in what is presently Jubaland region.

== History ==
The organization was founded by a group of disaffected senior military officers, primarily from the Ogaden and Absame, led by Col. Shukri Weyrah Kariye and Col. Bililiqo. The initial area of operations centered on the Jubaland region and the Kenyan border (Middle and Lower Juba). They were early allies of the United Somali Congress (USC) in operations against the regime of Siad Barre. A key accomplishment was the seizure of the highly strategic Baledogle Airbase in the days prior to Barre's flight from Mogadishu.

However, after Barre's flight, when Ali Mahdi's Manifesto Group announced the formation of an "interim government" without consulting SPM leadership, a crisis ensued. After fighting broke out between the Manifesto Group supporters and the SPM, the SPM was accused of suddenly reversing direction and allied itself with Barre, who was seeking to reestablish his regime. This reversal was angrily resisted by many of the original Ogadeni, who split off into their own faction.

The SPM thus sundered into two tribal-oriented factions:

- SPM Absame, or SPM-SNA, under Ahmed Omar Jess and Gedi Ugas Madhar
- SPM Harti, under Chairman Aden Abdillahi Nur "Gabyow" (himself from Ogaden's Absame clan) and General Mohamed Siad Hersi "Morgan" (Militia Commander)

On August 12, 1992, the SPM mainly Absame faction joined General Aidid to form the Somali National Alliance. The SPM fractured along tribal lines, and massacres and ethnic cleansing began between the two rival factions, as well as their external enemies.

In 1998, the SPM (Harti/Absame) under General "Morgan", based out of Kismayo, founded the autonomous state of Jubaland. They were strenuously opposed by the Allied Somali Forces, which later became the Juba Valley Alliance. The SPM and ASF/JVA contended over the control of south Somalia until the JVA proved victorious, driving General "Morgan" into exile.

== See also ==
- Somali Civil War
- Factions in the Somali Civil War
