= Mohamed Said Samatar =

Somali politician (1928–1995)

Mohamed Said Samatar محمد سعيد سمتر

Personal details
- Born: September 5, 1928 Werder, Ethiopia
- Died: March 8, 1995 (aged 66) Sceaux, France

Mohamed Said Samantar "Ga'lie - Gacaliye" was a Somali politician.

== Biography ==
He was born in Werder, and grew up in a town in eastern Ethiopia. While very young, he participated in the fight for his country's independence. In 1947 he joined the Somali Youth League, a movement opposing the British occupation. After attending normal school, he became an elementary teacher, then worked for BBC Somali and Radio Mogadishu and, in 1958, went to Rome, where he was placed in charge of RAI's Africa and Somali Service (Italian Radio Broadcasting and Television Company) broadcasts to Africa.

While in Rome, he studied political science and in February 1964, he obtained his PhD in political science from Sapienza University of Rome and joined the Somali Ministry of Foreign Affairs. He was ambassador to the European Economic Community in Brussels from 1964 to 1966, to Italy and the FAO (Food and Agriculture Organization) in Rome from 1969 to 1974, and to the French Government in Paris from 1974 to 1979.

He was one of the main Somali architects and strategists for Djibouti's independence from France in 1977. He was later appointed minister of state at the presidency in Mogadishu in 1979 and placed in charge of relations with the Western powers in a particularly touchy regional and international context involving the commitment of the Soviet Union and Cuba on behalf of Ethiopia. He handed in his resignation in Paris in September 1981.

He was a neutral figure at the onset of the Somali civil war, but later on he contributed to the founding of the SNF group and was in very good terms with many of the new Ethiopian leaders that took over after the demise of Mengistu's regime in May 1991, particularly with the then President Meles Ato Zenawi.

He was among the very few decent Somali politicians, a voice of moderation and a lover and supporter of the arts and artists, before and during the Somali strife. He left behind many writings, poems and famous songs.

He died on March 8, 1995, in Sceaux, France, after a long struggle against liver cancer and was buried at the Cimetière parisien de Thiais on March 13, 1995.
