= Hussein Farrah Aidid =

Somali political leader (born 1962)

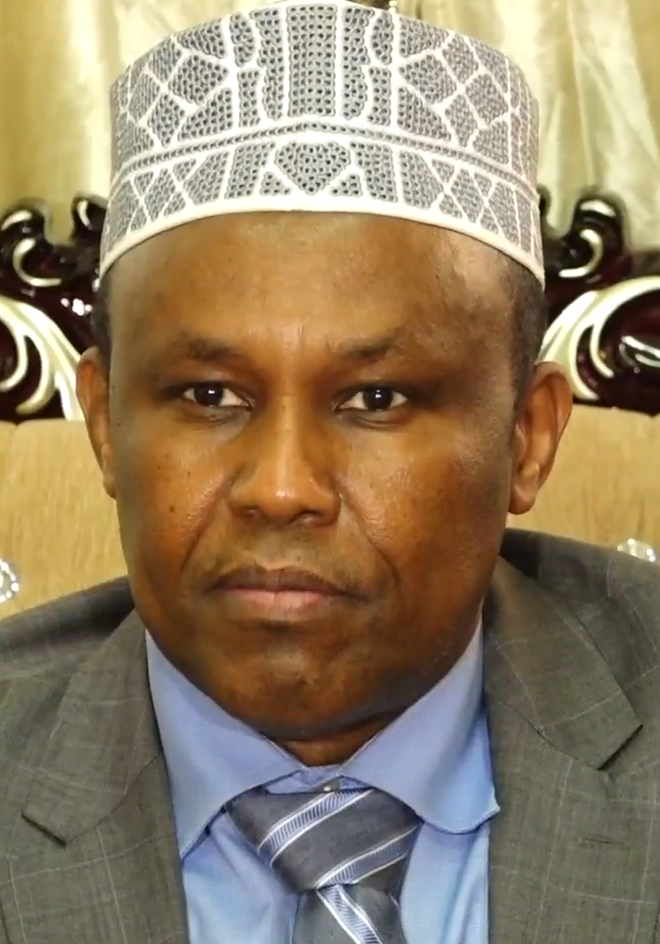
- Hussein Aidid in 2021

Personal details
- Born: August 16, 1962 (age 64) Mudug Region, Somalia
- Party: Somali National Alliance (SNA)
- Parent: Mohamed Farrah Aidid
- Awards: Marine Corps Expeditionary Medal; Armed Forces Expeditionary Medal

Military service
- Branch/service: United States Marine Corps
- Years of service: 1987–1995
- Rank: Corporal
- Unit: Battery B, 14th Marine Regiment; 2nd Battalion, 9th Marine Regiment
- Battles/wars: Operation Desert Storm; Operation Restore Hope

Hussein Mohamed Farrah Aidid (Somali: Xuseen Maxamed Faarax Caydiid, Arabic: حسين محمد فارح عيديد) (born August 16, 1962) is a Somali politician.

He is the son of General Mohamed Farrah Aidid. His father was leader of the Somali National Alliance (SNA), the faction that fought UNOSOM II and US forces during 1993. He is a veteran of the United States Marine Corps, having served during Desert Storm, serving in the US military from 1987 to 1995. For two weeks he served as a translator for the UNITAF forces commander in Somalia. Farrah succeeded his father as leader of the SNA, and two days after his father's death, the SNA declared Farrah as the new President, although he too was not internationally recognized as such.

Farrah relinquished his claim as president in December 1997 by signing the Cairo Declaration. During the early 2000s, he opposed the newly formed Transitional National Government (TNG) as a member of the Somalia Reconciliation and Restoration Council (SRRC). He became a member of the Transitional Federal Government (TFG) that was formed in 2004, backing the Ethiopian invasion of Somalia. Aidid later defected to the Alliance for the Re-Liberation of Somalia (ARS) that was fighting against the Ethiopian military occupation.

== Early life ==
Born in Galkacyo, Farrah is a son of Mohamed Farrah Aidid and is sometimes known as Hussein Mohamed Farrah Aidid, Hussein Aidid or Aidid Junior. He emigrated to the United States when he was 17 years old, and attended Covina High School, Covina, California, graduating in 1981.

In 1987 he went to Citrus College in Glendora, California, and three years after California State University at Long Beach to study civil engineering.

== United States military service ==
In April 1987, Farrah enlisted in the United States Marine Corps Reserve as an artilleryman. Following his training, he was assigned to the FDC, Fire Direction Control center, of Battery B of the 1st Battalion, 14th Marine Regiment at the Marine Corps reserve training center in Pico Rivera, California. He served during Operation Desert Storm when B 1/14 was mobilized in support of that war. During an engineering class, two Marine officers had interrupted a lecture to inform him he was urgently needed in Somalia.

At the end of 1992, US forces deployed to Somalia. Farrah, at the time one of the few available Somali language translators with the Marines, was attached to UNITAF forces commander Lt. Gen. Robert B. Johnston. Farrah was the only person in the Marine Corps who was fluent in speaking Somali. On account of this, UNITAF force commander Johnson designated Farrah his personal translator. Farrah was only in Somalia for two weeks during the operation. He served from December 18, 1992, to January 5, 1993, before returning home to the United States the next day. During this period he served as a liaison between US forces and his father, Mohamed Farrah Aidid. Farrah later recounted about his service to the Associated Press:

''I always wanted to be a marine...You know how it is watching Marine soldiers. I'm proud of my background and military discipline. Once a marine, always a marine.''

After the Battle of Mogadishu several months later, Farrah was working for a local government in California. According to Farrah a Marine colonel had asked him to "beg his father to release a captured American pilot".

== Somali National Alliance (SNA) ==
When he turned 30 years old, Farrah was selected by the Habar Gidir clan as successor to his father and returned to Somalia. In the second half of the 1990s, different faction leaders vied for the Presidency, with none receiving international recognition. General Mohamed Farrah Aidid claimed to be President from June 15, 1995, to his death on August 1, 1996. Following this Hussein was sworn in as "interim President", and became leader of the Somali National Alliance (SNA), the same alliance his father led against the US forces. Farrah was seen by the West as a chance of improvement for the relationships between them and Somalia.

On September 1, 1996, Aidid met with UN representatives for the first time, to deal with issues left over as legacies of his father's administration. Issues addressed at the meeting which needed to be resolved before the return of UN workers and the resumption of UN assistance.

On December 17, 1996, rival warlord Ali Mahdi Mohamed attacked his headquarters, leaving 135 dead after five days of fighting in Mogadishu.

On December 22, 1997, he relinquished the disputed title of President by signing the Cairo Declaration, in Cairo, Egypt following a peace process between the Salbalar administration and the Soodare Group.

On March 30, 1998, Ali Mahdi Mohamed and Hussein Aidid signed a peace treaty in which they agreed to share power over Mogadishu, ending seven years of fighting following the ousting of Siad Barre.

On February 23, 1999, militiamen loyal to Aidid murdered 60 civilians in Baidoa and Daynunay.

== Somalia Reconciliation and Restoration Council (SRRC) ==
Hussein Aidid refused to recognize the newly forming Djibouti-backed Mogadishu-based Transitional Federal Government (TFG), accusing it of "harboring militant Islamist sympathizers." Instead he formed the rival Somalia Reconciliation and Restoration Council (SRRC) in early 2001. During the early 2000s, Villa Somalia was under the control of Aidids SRRC and his militia used the Villa as a base to attack the TNG and forces loyal to it.

At some time during late 2001, he advised US President George W. Bush that a money transfer and telecommunications company, Al Barakaat, "had ties to terrorists and that there were terrorists in Somalia sympathetic to Osama bin Laden." He also "warned that militant Islamist Pakistani proselytizers were active in Mogadishu and other Somali cities and that they have strong links to Al-Itihaad al-Islamiya." In July 2003, at the Somali National Reconciliation Conference, the SRRC and TNG leadership reached key compromises: "The TNG accepted the number of parliamentarians proposed by the SRRC while the latter approved the inclusion of politicians as requested by the TNG."

== Transitional Federal Government (TFG) ==
Offices held:

- Deputy Prime Minister (2005 – May 13, 2007)
- Minister of the Interior (2005 – February 7, 2007)
- Minister of Public Works and Housing (February 7, 2007 – December 2008)

On December 28, 2006, after the defeat of the Islamic Courts Union (ICU), Aidid was present when government forces entered Mogadishu.

On February 7, 2007, as part of Prime Minister Ali Mohamed Ghedi's cabinet reshuffling, he was moved from Minister of the Interior to Minister of Public Works and Housing.

On May 13, 2007, he was sacked from the position of deputy prime minister, with the reason being given that he was inactive in his duties. This followed Aidid's defection to Asmara, Eritrea, and his accusation that Ethiopia was guilty of "genocide" and calling for its withdrawal.

== See also ==
- Ali Mahdi Muhammad
- Osman Ali Atto
- Yusuf Mohammed Siad
- Mohamed Afrah Qanyare
