= Mohamed Farrah Aidid =

Somali military officer, warlord, and disputed President of Somalia (1934–1996)

Brigadier General Mohamed Farrah Aidid
- Maxamed Faarax Caydiid محمد فارح عيديد
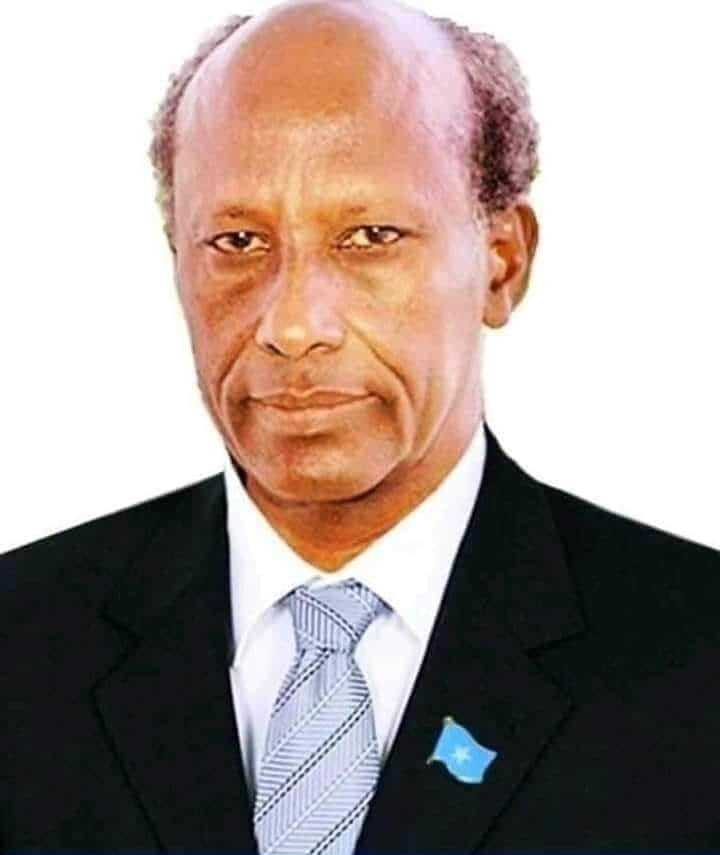
- Aidid in 1995

President of Somalia (Claimed)
- Disputed with Ali Mahdi Muhammad
- In office 15 June 1995 – 2 August 1996
- Preceded by: Mohamed Siad Barre
- Succeeded by: Ali Mahdi Muhammad

Personal details
- Born: 15 December 1934 Beledweyne, Italian Somaliland
- Died: 2 August 1996 (aged 61) Mogadishu, Somalia
- Cause of death: Heart attack
- Party: United Somali Congress/Somali National Alliance (USC/SNA)
- Spouse: Khadiga Gurhan
- Children: Hussein Farrah Aidid
- Education: Frunze Military Academy

Military service
- Allegiance: (Italy) Trust Territory of Somaliland (1954–1960) (Somalia) Somali Republic (1960–1969); Somali Democratic Republic (1969–1989) (Somalia) United Somali Congress (1989–1992) (Somalia) Somali National Alliance (1992–1996)
- Years of service: 1954–1996
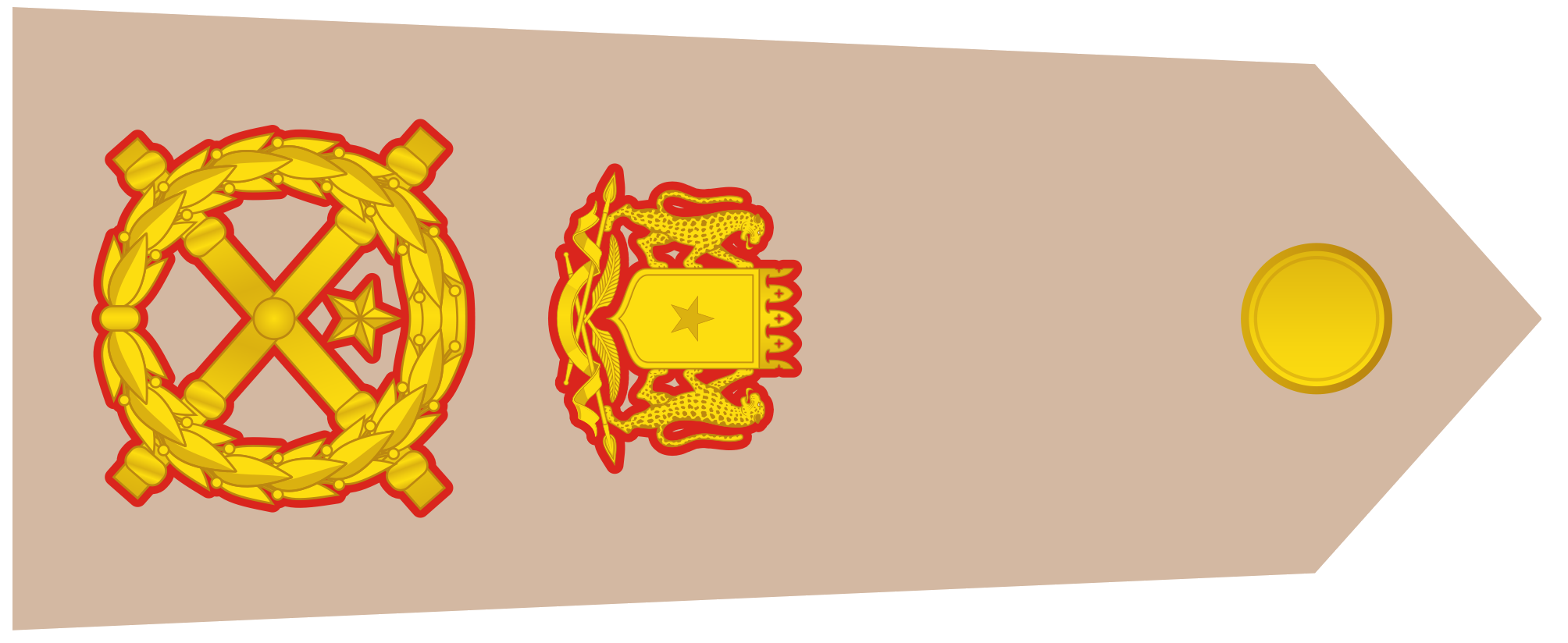
- Rank: Brigadier General
- Battles/wars: Border War of 1964; Ogaden War; Border War of 1982; Somali Civil War; UNOSOM II; Battle of Mogadishu

Mohamed Farrah Hasan Garad (Somali: Maxamed Faarax Xasan Garaad, 'Caydiid Garaad' ; Arabic: محمد فرح حسن عيديد; 15 December 1934 – 1 August 1996), popularly known as General Aidid or Aideed, was a Somali military officer, diplomat, and warlord.

== Biography ==
Educated in Rome and at the Frunze Military Academy in Moscow, he began his career during the 1950s serving as a police chief in the Italian ruled United Nations trusteeship security forces. Following Somalia's independence in 1960, Aidid became an officer in the Somali National Army. He eventually rose to the rank of Brigadier general and commanded military forces during the 1977–78 Ogaden War and the 1982–83 Border War. From 1984 to 1989, he was the ambassador to India for the Somali Democratic Republic.

In 1989, as the Somali Rebellion against Siad Barre was escalating, Aidid became a major leader within the rebel United Somali Congress (USC), and soon after the rebel faction coalition the Somali National Alliance (SNA). Along with other armed opposition groups in early 1991, he succeeded in toppling Barre's 22 year old regime, leading to the full outbreak of the civil war. Aidid possessed aspirations for presidency of the new Somali government, and sought alliances and unions with other politico-military organizations in order to form a national government.

Following the 5 June 1993 clash that resulted in the death of dozens of UNOSOM II troops, the SNA—and by extension, Aidid—were blamed, causing him to become one of the first wanted men of the United Nations. After the US-led 12 July 1993 Bloody Monday raid, which resulted in the death of many eminent members of his Habr Gidr clan, Aidid began deliberately targeting American troops for the first time. US president Bill Clinton responded by implementing Operation Gothic Serpent, and deploying Delta Force and Task Force Ranger to capture him. The high American casualty rate of the ensuing Battle of Mogadishu on 3–4 October 1993, led UNOSOM to cease its four month long mission. In December 1993, the U.S. Army flew Aidid to Addis Ababa to engage in peace talks.

During a battle in Mogadishu between his militia and the forces of his former ally Osman Ali Atto, Aidid was fatally wounded by a sniper and later died on 2 August 1996.

== Early life ==
Aidid was born in 1934 in Beledweyne, Italian Somaliland. He is from the Habar Gidir subclan of the greater Hawiye clan. During the era of the British Military Administration he moved to Galkayo in the Mudug region to stay with a cousin, a policeman who would teach Aidid to both type and speak in Italian.

Soon after, during the period of the Italian ruled United Nations trusteeship which began in 1950, a young Aidid enlisted in the Corpo di Polizia della Somalia (Police Corps of Somalia) and in 1954 was sent to Italy to be trained at an infantry school in Rome, after which he was appointed to work under several high ranking Somali police officers. In 1958, Aidid would serve as Chief of Police in Banaadir Province, and the following year he returned to Italy to receive further education. He was also a member of the Somali Youth League (SYL), the leading political group advocating for Somalia's independence. According to Aidid, he and other officers debated with Italian administrators who opposed forming a Somali military, arguing the United Nations would provide security for the nation. Aidid argued with Italian UN officials that the Ethiopian Empire posed a serious threat and Somalia needed its own armed forces.

In 1960, Somalia gained independence and Aidid joined the newly formed Somali National Army. He was promoted to lieutenant and became aide-de-camp of Maj. Gen. Daud Abdulle Hirsi, the first commander of the Somali National Army. Aidid first gained combat experience commanding Somali army troops during the escalating border skirmishes against the Ethiopian Imperial Army that preceded the 1964 Ethiopian–Somali War. Requiring more formal training and having been recognized as a highly qualified officer, he was later selected to study advanced post graduate military science at the Frunze Military Academy (Военная академия им. М. В. Фрунзе) in the Soviet Union for three years, an elite institution reserved for the most qualified officers of the Warsaw Pact armies and their allies.

=== October 1969 Coup d'état and imprisonment ===
In 1969, a few days after the assassination of Somalia's President Abdirashid Ali Sharmarke, a military junta known as the Supreme Revolutionary Council (SRC), led by Major General Mohamed Siad Barre, would take advantage of the disarray and stage a bloodless coup d'état on the democratically elected Somali government. At the time Aidid was serving as Lieutenant Colonel in the army with 26th Division in Hargeisa. He was also the Head of Operations for the Central and Northern Regions of Somalia. After the assassination, he was relieved of his duties and was recalled to Mogadishu to lead the troops guarding the burial of the deceased President. By November 1969, he had quickly fallen under suspicion by high-ranking members of the Supreme Revolutionary Council, including Barre. Without trial, he was subsequently detained in Mandera Prison along with Colonel Abdullahi Yusuf Ahmed for nearly six years. Aidid and Yusuf were both widely regarded to be politically ambitious officers, and potential figureheads in a future coup attempt. Aidid claimed that his imprisonment was a result of encouraging President Barre to transfer power over from the Somali military to civilian technocrats.

=== Return to military service ===
Aidid was eventually released in October 1975, and he returned to service in the Somali National Army to take part in the 1977-1978 Ogaden War against Ethiopia. During the war, he was promoted to brigadier general and became an aide-de-camp to President Mohammed Siad Barre. Headquartered in Hargeisa, Brig Gen Aidid and Maj Gen Gallel would command the 26th Division on the Dire Dawa Front. In one of the final Somali offensive actions of the war, SNA brigades under Aidid's command attacked Ethiopian forces holding the strategic Addis Ababa–Djibouti Railway in March 1978, aiming to delay and divert the enemy as the rest of the army withdrew. His forces seized a significant section of the rail line, destroyed parts of it, and held their positions for as long as it was tenable. According to Aidid, several Soviet Armed Forces military experts embedded with the Ethiopian/Cuban army—who had previously worked with him in Somalia—shifted their focus from the withdrawing SNA to his brigades upon recognizing his presence on the Dire Dawa front.

Following the Ogaden War, having served with distinction, Aidid worked as a presidential staffer to Barre before being appointed intelligence minister. He was highly critical of how Barre handled the SNA withdrawal from the Ogaden and later charged that the president failed "[to] give promotions or medals to those who fought heroically". Aidid claimed this and other issues caused resentment in the armed forces. Under pressure from President Barre, Aidid gave a written guarantee in 1978 that Col Abdullahi Yusuf would not attempt a coup d'eat. Yusuf would go on to break the pledge in a failed coup attempt and escaped to Ethiopia. Aidid was left stranded but was rescued by a high ranking ally in the regime, and was consequently saved from any punishment.

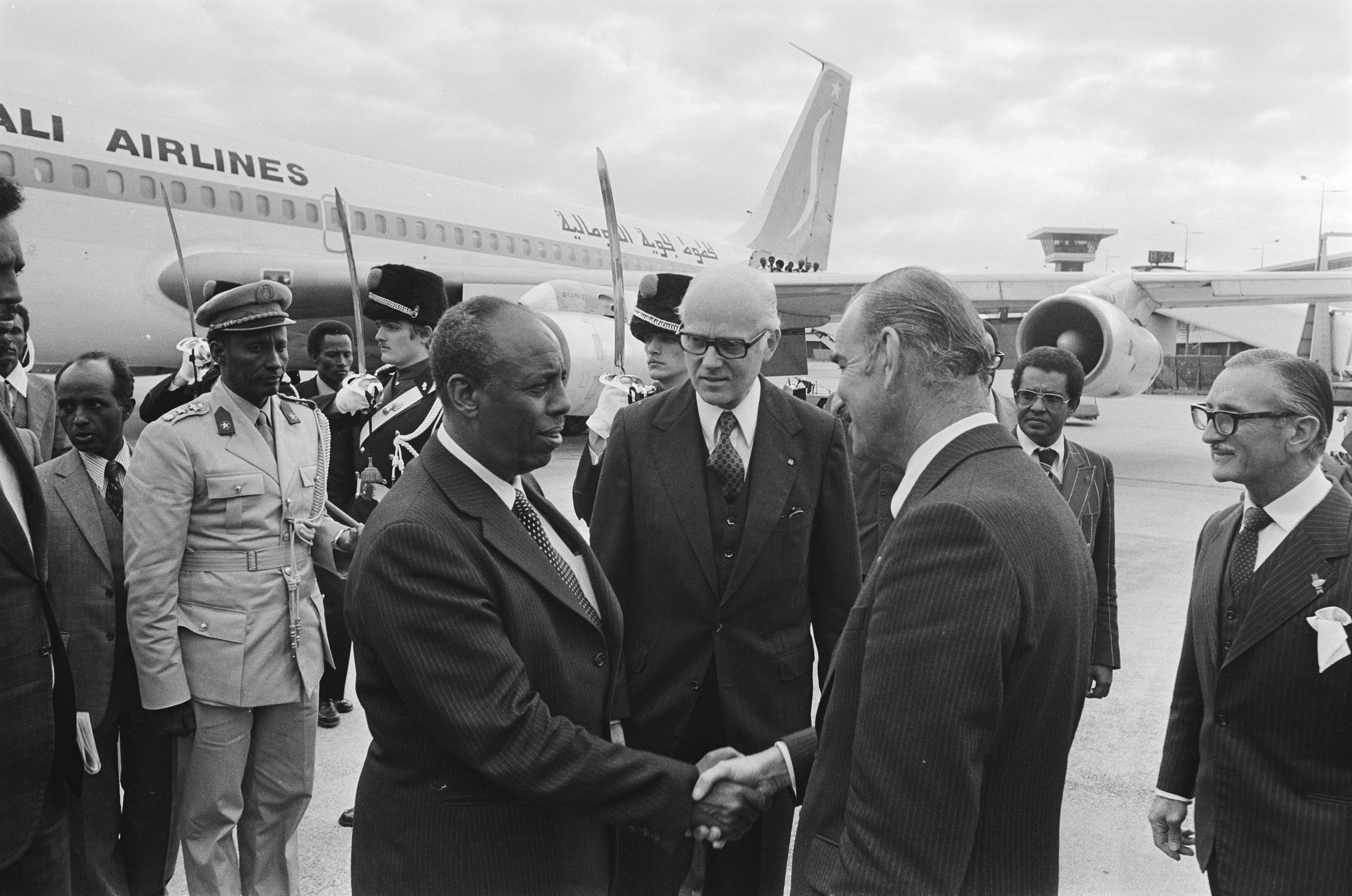
Brigadier General Aidid (left), and President Barre meeting Dutch Minister of Foreign Affairs Chris van der Klaauw in the Netherlands in 1978.

During the 1982 war with Ethiopia, Aidid, serving under General Yusuf Ahmed Salhan, was a top Somali National Army commander, leading the defense of central Somalia's border regions against Ethiopian military offensives.

== Somali Rebellion and Civil War ==
In 1979, Barre had appointed Aidid to parliament, but in 1984, after perceiving him as a potential rival, sent him away to India by making Aidid the ambassador for Somalia.

He would use his time in the country to frequently attend lectures at the University of Delhi and, with the aid of Indian lecturers at the University of Delhi, completed three books (A Vision of Somalia, The Preferred Future Development in Somalia, and Somalia from the Dawn of Human Civilization to Today).

=== United Somali Congress ===
By the late 1980s, Barre's regime had become increasingly unpopular. The State took an increasingly hard line, and insurgencies, encouraged by Ethiopia's communist Derg administration, sprang up across the country. Being a member of the Hawiye clan, a high ranking government official and an experienced soldier, Aidid was deemed a natural choice for helping lead the military campaign for the United Somali Congress against the regime, and he was soon persuaded to leave New Delhi and return to Somalia.

Aidid defected from the embassy to India in 1989 and then left the country to join the growing opposition against the Barre regime. Following his defection, he had received an invitation from Ethiopian President Mengistu Haile-Mariam, who would go on to give Aidid permission to create and run a USC military operation from Ethiopian soil. From base camps near the Somali-Ethiopian border, he began directing the final military offensive of the newly formed United Somali Congress to seize Mogadishu and topple the regime.

The USC was at that time split into three factions: USC-Rome, USC-Mogadishu, later followed by USC-Ethiopia; as neither the first two former locations were a suitable launching pad to topple the Barre regime. Ali Mahdi Mohamed, an influential member of the congress who would later become Aidid's prime rival, opposed Aidid's involvement in the USC and supported the Rome faction of the Congress, who also resented Aidid. The first serious signs of fractures within the USC came in June 1990, when Mahdi and the USC-Rome faction rejected the election of Aidid to chairman of the USC, disputing the validity of the vote. That same month Aidid would go on to form a military alliance with the northern Somali National Movement (SNM) and the Somali Patriotic Movement (SPM). In October 1990, the SNM, SPM and USC would sign an agreement to hold no peace talks until the complete and total overthrow of the Barre regime. They further agreed to form a provisional government following Barres removal, and then to hold elections.

By November 1990, the news of Gen. Aidid's USC forces overrunning President Siad Barres 21st army in the Mudug, Galgudud and Hiran regions convinced many that a war in Mogadishu was imminent, leading the civilian population of the city to begin rapidly arming itself. This, combined with actions of other rebel organizations, eventually led to the full outbreak of the Somali civil war, the gradual breakup of the Somali Armed Forces, and the toppling of the Barre regime in Mogadishu on 26 January 1991. Following the power vacuum left by the fall of Barre, the situation in Somalia began to rapidly spiral out of control, and rebel factions subsequently began to fight for control of the remnants of the Somali state. Most notably, the split between the two main factions of the United Somali Congress (USC), led by Aidid and his rival Ali Mahdi, would result in serious fighting and vast swathes of Mogadishu were consequently destroyed as both factions attempted to exert control over the city.

Both Ali Mahdi and Aidid claimed to lead national unity governments, and each vied to lead the reconstruction of the Somali state.

=== Somali National Alliance ===
Aidid's wing of the USC would morph into the Somalia National Alliance (SNA) or USC/SNA. During the spring and summer of 1992, Former President Siad Barres army attempted to retake Mogadishu, but successful joint defence and counterattack by Aidid's USC wing, the Somali Patriotic Movement (SPM), the Somali Southern National Movement (SSNM) and Somali Democratic Movement (SDM) (all united under the banner of the Somali Liberation Army) to push the last remnants of Barres troops out of southern Somalia into Kenya on 16 June 1992 would lead to the formation of the political union known as the Somali National Alliance. This absorption of different political organizations was critical to Aidid's approach to taking the presidency.

As leader of the Somali National Alliance, Aidid, with presidential aspirations, expressed the goal of using the SNA as a base for working toward forming a national reconciliation government and claimed to also be aiming for an eventual multi-party democracy. To this end Aidid required and sought political agreements with the only two remaining major factions, the Somali National Movement (SNM) and Somali Salvation Democratic Front (SSDF), to leave his main rival Ali Mahdi Mohamed isolated in an enclave in North Mogadishu.

Aidid's grip on power in the SNA was fragile, as his ability to impose decisions on the organization was limited. A council of elders held decision-making power for most significant issues and elections were held that threatened Aidid's chairmanship.

== United Nations Intervention ==
In April 1992 the United Nations intervened in Somalia, creating UNOSOM I. United Nations Security Council Resolution 794 was unanimously passed on 3 December 1992, which approved a coalition led by the United States. Forming the Unified Task Force (UNITAF), the alliance was given the task of assuring security until humanitarian efforts were transferred to the UN.

Aidid initially publicly opposed the deployment of United Nations forces to Somalia, but eventually relented. He and UN Secretary-General Boutros Boutros Ghali both despised one another. Before being Secretary-General, Boutros Ghali had been an Egyptian diplomat that had supported President Siad Barre against the USC in the late 80s and early 90s. At Atto's urging, Aidid decided to welcome the deployment of American military forces under UNITAF (Operation Restore Hope) in December 1992, in part because Atto had close ties to U.S. embassy officials in Nairobi, Kenya and the American oil company Conoco. In January 1993, Special Representative of the UN in Somalia, Ismat Kittani, requested that Aidid come to the Addis Ababa Peace Conference set to be held in March.

=== UNOSOM II ===
In early May 1993, Gen. Aidid and Col. Abdullahi Yusuf of the Somali Salvation Democratic Front (SSDF) agreed to convene a peace conference for central Somalia. In light of recent conflict between the two, the initiative was seen as a major step towards halting the Somali Civil War. Gen. Aidid, having initiated the talks with Col. Yusuf, considered himself the conference chair, setting the agenda. Beginning 9 May, elder delegations from their respective clans, Habr Gidr and Majerteen, met. While Aidid and Yusuf aimed for a central Somalia-focused conference, they clashed with UNOSOM, which aimed to include other regions and replace Aidid's chairmanship with Abdullah Osman, a staunch critic of Aidid. As the conference began, Aidid sought assistance from UNOSOM ambassador Lansana Kouyate, who proposed air transport and accommodation for delegates. However, he was recalled and replaced by April Glaspie, following which UNOSOM retracted its offer. Aidid resorted to private aircraft to transport delegates. Following the incident, Aidid publicly rebuked the United Nations on Radio Mogadishu for interference in Somali internal affairs.

Aidid invited Special Representative of the Secretary-General for Somalia, Adm. Jonathan Howe to open the conference, which was refused. The differences between Aidid and the UN proved to be too great, and the conference proceeded without the United Nations participation. On 2 June 1993 the conference between Gen. Aidid and Col. Abdullahi Yusuf successfully concluded. Admiral Howe would be invited to witness the peace agreement, but again declined. The Galkacyo peace accord successfully ended large scale conflict in the Galgadud and Mudug regions of Somalia.

==== Conflict with American and UN forces ====
The contention between the Somali National Alliance and UNOSOM from this point forward would begin to manifest in anti-UNOSOM propaganda broadcasts from SNA controlled Radio Mogadishu. The broadcasts were viewed as a threat to the operation and that station was searched, sparking the 5 June 1993 battle and the start of UNOSOM II military operations against the Somali National Alliance. The UNOSOM offensive had significant negative political consequences for the intervention as it widely alienated the Somali people, strengthened political support for Aidid, and led to growing criticism of the operation internationally. As a result, numerous UNOSOM II contingents began to increasingly push for a more conciliatory and diplomatic approach with the SNA. Each major armed confrontation between UNOSOM II forces and the SNA was noted to have the inadvertent effect of increasing Aidid's stature with the Somali public.

After the October 1993 Battle of Mogadishu, US President Bill Clinton defended American policy in Somalia but admitted that it had been a mistake for American forces to be drawn into the decision to "personalize the conflict" to Aidid. He reappointed the former Special Envoy for Somalia Robert B. Oakley to signal the administration's return to focusing on political reconciliation. According to U.S. Army Brig. General Ed Wheeler, "Clinton finally realized Aidid was more than merely the head of some equivalent Los Angeles street gang." Clinton signaled he was prepared to ignore the UNSCR 837 and include Aidid in talks for a peaceful settlement. The U.S. Army flew Aidid to Addis Ababa on a military aircraft in December 1993 for peace talks. He arrived at the Mogadishu airport in an American armored vehicle guarded by American forces and his own Somali National Alliance before being flown to Ethiopia. Some of the US military units assigned to Aidid's security detail had lost soldiers in the Battle of Mogadishu. In early 1994 he attended the Pan African Congress held in the Ugandan capital, Kampala, where he was reportedly greeted with a standing ovation.

After the cessation of hostilities between the SNA and UNOSOM, Special Representative Lansana Kouyate (replacing Adm. Jonathan Howe) successfully launched an initiative to normalize relations in March 1994. Numerous points of contention between the respective organizations were discussed at length and understandings were reached, facilitating the normalization of the relationship between the UN and the SNA. That same year the UNOSOM forces began withdrawing, completing the process by 1995. The withdrawal of UNOSOM forces weakened Aidid's prominence within the SNA, as the war had served to unify the alliance around a common foreign enemy.

== Presidency declaration ==
Aidid subsequently declared himself President of Somalia in June 1995. However, his declaration received no international recognition, as his rival Ali Mahdi Muhammad had already been elected interim president at a conference in 1991 in Djibouti and recognized as such by the international community.

== Death ==
On 24 July 1996, Aidid and his men clashed with the forces of former allies Ali Mahdi Muhammad and Osman Ali Atto. Atto was a former supporter and financier of Aidid, and of the same subclan. Atto is alleged to have masterminded the defeat of Aidid. Aidid suffered a gunshot wound in the ensuing battle. He later died from a heart attack on 2 August 1996, either during or after surgery to treat his injuries.

== Personal life ==
During the lead up to the civil war, Aidid's wife Khadiga Gurhan sought asylum in Canada in 1989, taking their four children with her. Local media shortly afterwards alleged that she had returned to Somalia for a five-month stay while still receiving welfare payments. Gurhan admitted in an interview to collecting welfare and having briefly traveled to Somalia in late 1991. However, it was later brought to light that she had been granted landed immigrant status in June 1991, thereby making her a legal resident of Canada. Additionally, Aidid's rival, Barre, had been overthrown in January of that year. This altogether ensured that Gurhan's five-month trip would not have undermined her initial 1989 claim of refugee status. An official probe by Canadian immigration officials into the allegations also concluded that she had obtained her landing papers through normal legal processes.

Hussein Mohamed Farrah, son of Aidid, emigrated to the United States when he was 17 years old. Staying 16 years in the country, he eventually became a naturalized citizen and later a United States Marine who served in Somalia. Two days after his father's death, the Somali National Alliance declared Farrah as the new president, although he too was not internationally recognised.

Aidid while serving as Somali ambassador to India, developed a relationship with the Indian spiritual leader Sathya Sai Baba, whom he consulted in connection with his long-standing ambition to remove President Siad Barre from power and assume the presidency himself.

Aidid was introduced to Sai Baba through Italian political connections linked to then-Prime Minister Bettino Craxi; Craxi’s brother Antonio was a follower of Sai Baba, and members of the Craxi family had ties to Sai Baba’s educational institutions.
