= Dhobley =

Dhobley may refer to:

- Dhobley (Gedo Region), in the Baardheere District of Somalia
- Dhobley (Lower Juba Region), in the Afmadow District of Somalia
