= Osman Ali Atto =

Somali faction leader

Osman Ali Atto (1940 – 5 August 2013), also spelled Ato, was a Somali businessman, faction leader, and politician affiliated with the Somali National Alliance. Atto served as the primary advisor and financier of Mohammed Farah Aidid. He was also the Somalia representative of the American petroleum company Conoco.

In September 1993 he was captured by American special forces conducting Operation Gothic Serpent in support of UNOSOM II. He was released in January 1994. In a battle between him and Aidid in Mogadishu during August 1996, Aidid was fatally wounded by one of Atto's snipers. During the Ethiopian military occupation of the mid-2000s, Atto was member of parliament within the Transitional Federal Government.

== Somali Civil War ==
In the early 1990s, Atto was Somalia's khat industry leader, when he was second in command to Mohammed Farah Aidid. He worked as both the principal advisor and financer of Aidid. At Atto's urging, Aidid initially welcomed the deployment of American military forces under UNITAF (Operation Restore Hope) in December 1992, in part because Atto had close ties to U.S. embassy officials in Nairobi, Kenya and the American oil company Conoco. He served as the representative of Conoco in Somalia and was widely believed to have contacts with the Central Intelligence Agency. According to journalist Scott Peterson, Atto had "constant contact" with American officials. US diplomat Robert B. Oakley utilized Atto's property during UNITAF.

On 21 September 1993, During UNOSOM II, Atto was captured by the American Task Force Ranger, from a location near Digfer Hospital. The Rangers had made an earlier attempt at Atto's capture, but missed him by seconds. In a speech at a church in Daytona, in January 2002, William Boykin, responsible for the operation, recounted, "There was a man in Mogadishu named Osman Atto... He went on CNN and he laughed at us, and he said, 'They'll never get me because Allah will protect me.'" The arrest was later portrayed in the 2001 film Black Hawk Down.

In a 2002 interview with the BBC, Atto indicated that many aspects of the movie are factually incorrect. He took exception with the ostentatious character chosen to portray him; Atto does not look like the actor who portrayed him (George Harris), smoke cigars, or wear earrings, facts which were later confirmed by SEAL Team Six sniper Howard E. Wasdin in his 2012 memoirs. Wasdin also indicated that while the character in the movie ridiculed his captors, Atto in reality seemed concerned that Wasdin and his men had been sent to kill rather than apprehend him.

Atto stated that he was not consulted about the project or approached for permission, and that the film sequence re-enacting his arrest contained several inaccuracies: "First of all when I was caught on 21 September, I was only travelling with one Fiat 124, not three vehicles as it shows in the film. ... And when the helicopter attacked, people were hurt, people were killed. ... The car we were travelling in, and I have got proof, it was hit at least 50 times. And my colleague Ahmed Ali was injured on both legs. ... I think it was not right, the way they portrayed both the individual and the action. It was not right."

After his capture, Atto was held by the Americans on Camia island off the southern coast of Somalia until January 1994. Some Somalis associated with the conflict believed that Atto was a top intelligence source working as a double agent for the Americans and had been arrested in a set up as he was longer useful. While Atto claimed that his imprisonment had been harsh, many Somalis believed he had in fact been held in relatively good conditions and gained weight. Scott Peterson observed that among all the interrogations reports of top-level Somali detainees, the summary for Ato "was positively glowing" while reports on other Somalis were critical of a lack of cooperation and detainees being "nasty".

On 9 July 1994, the Lower Jubba Peace Conference led to a peace agreement signed by Atto as the Somali National Alliance (SNA) representative and by general Hersi Morgan of the Somali National Front (SNF). However, Hersi Morgan's adversaries in Lower Jubba, the Absame clan, did not take part, making the peace accord stillborn. In late 1994, Atto's car drove over a land mine and broke both his feet.

== War against Aidid ==
Aidid and Atto reportedly became enemies over a disagreement related to how to handle the Islamic Courts. During April 1996, Atto's 18-year-old son who was not participating in the fighting was shot in the head by a sniper during a battle between his father and Aidid's forces. Aidid was later killed by a sniper during a battle against Atto's militia during August 1996.

The U.S. Department of State asserted, in its Country Report for Somalia for the year 2000, that the killing of Yusuf Tallan, a former general under the Barre regime, was connected to Atto. The report did not provide specific corroboration for the assertion.

Militiamen loyal to Atto are also alleged to be responsible for a 14 July 2001, ambush of a World Food Programme (WFP) relief convoy near Mogadishu, in which six persons were killed.

In 2004, the chairman of the Security Council Committee described Atto as an individual who exemplifies "the interaction between looting and the exploitation of Somalia's resources and infrastructure and the financing of warfare".

== Transitional Federal Government ==
During the Ethiopian military occupation of Somalia in the mid-2000's, Atto was a member of parliament within the Transitional Federal Government (TFG). Atto resigned from his post of Minister for Public works and Housing during July 2006 in response to the threat of a possible attack on Mogadishu using Ethiopian troops being made by TFG leaders Abdullahi Yusuf and Ali Gedi. During June 2007 he accused the Ethiopian military of raiding his home and stealing thousands of dollars.

In 2007 and 2008, he was placed under house arrest in Baidoa. On 30 May 2008 he was captured by insurgents at a checkpoint in the town of Lego which was controlled by the Islamic Courts Union (ICU). The ICU were waging a guerilla war against Ethiopian troops and TFG militia, with Lego being a strategic point for ambushing these forces. He was eventually released by the rebels.

On 5 August 2013, Atto died of natural causes at his Mogadishu residence. A year after his death, a garage belonging to Atto was searched by African Union and Somali government forces, who recovered an assortment of weaponry.

== See also ==
- United Somali Congress
- Hussein Mohamed Farrah
- Musa Sudi Yalahow
- Transitional Federal Parliament
