= 2022 in Israel =

- Decades: 2000s; 2010s; 2020s
- See also: History of Israel; Timeline of Israeli history; List of years in Israel

Events in the year 2022 in Israel.

== Incumbents ==
- President of Israel – Isaac Herzog
- Prime Minister of Israel – Naftali Bennett until 30 June; Yair Lapid until 29 December; Benjamin Netanyahu since 29 December
- President of the Supreme Court – Esther Hayut
- Chief of General Staff – Aviv Kochavi
- Government of Israel – Thirty-sixth government of Israel and Thirty-seventh government of Israel

== Events ==
=== January ===
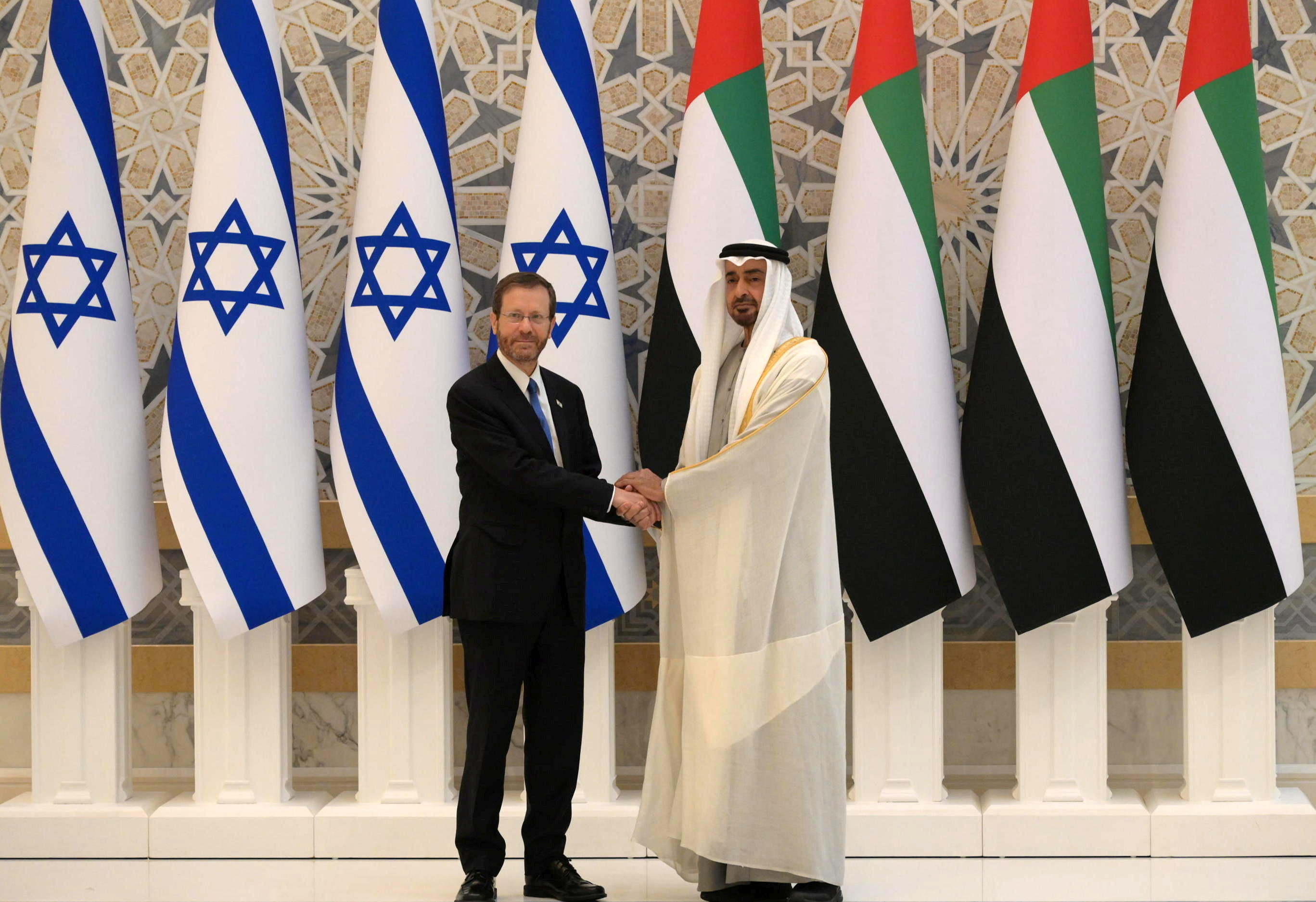
30 January: President Herzog meets the Crown Prince of Abu Dhabi, Mohamed bin Zayed Al Nahyan during his official visit to the United Arab Emirates.

- 1 January –
  - Two rockets fired from Gaza explode off the coast, one close to Tel Aviv and the second near Palmachim; the Israeli Air Force responds with strikes on Hamas targets in Gaza and tanks fire at Hamas military posts near Gaza's border with Israel.
  - The first case of "florona," which is believed to be a double infection of COVID-19 and influenza, is identified in an unvaccinated pregnant woman in labor at the Rabin Medical Center.
- 2 January – The first stage in a reform of Israel's kosher certification system comes into effect, allowing food retailers and manufacturers to select any religious council in the country to provide them with kashrut supervision, rather than only their local council.
- 3 January
  - Two Israel Air Force pilots are killed when a Eurocopter AS565 Panther helicopter crashes during a training exercise off the coast near Haifa, while a third crew member survives with moderate injuries.
  - Omar Hajirat, a four-year-old child is shot dead by a gunman in Bir al-Maksur.
  - The official homepage of the Jerusalem Post newspaper is suspected to be hacked by the Iranian Cyber Army, which was replaced with a threat targeting the Shimon Peres Negev Nuclear Research Center and an apparent reference to Qasem Soleimani, who was assassinated exactly two years earlier in Baghdad, Iraq.
- 5 January –
  - President Isaac Herzog and First Lady, Michal Herzog, receive their fourth dose of the COVID-19 vaccine as a second booster dose vaccination campaign begins in Israel.
  - A record 11,978 new cases of COVID-19 is reported in the past 24 hours, bringing the nationwide total of confirmed cases to 1,423,289.
- 9 January – Israel mostly reopens its borders, closed to tourists since November, and abolishes its "red list" of restricted travel countries, as coronavirus rates rise to record-high levels due to the Omicron variant, making the impact of travel bans negligible.
- 11 January - The Israeli Health ministry approves a reduction of the isolation period for asymptomatic positive COVID-19 patients from ten to seven days in order to keep the economy running despite an increase in the number of SARS-CoV-2 Omicron variant cases. The changes will be in effect on January 13.
- 12 January - Israel and the Argentine foreign ministry separately issue condemnations against the presence of Iranian minister Mohsen Rezaee, allegedly connected to the 1994 Buenos Aires Argentine Israelite Mutual Association bombing, at the inauguration of Nicaraguan President Daniel Ortega. (The Jerusalem Post)
- 13 January – Several days of clashes in the Negev Desert between Bedouin protesters and the police triggered by a forestation project leads to a coalition crisis and the government advancing a comprehensive plan to formalize the status of some unrecognized Bedouin settlements as permanent villages.
- 20 January
  - The United Nations General Assembly approves by consensus a resolution co-sponsored by Israel and other countries to combat Holocaust denial, on the 80th anniversary of the Wannsee Conference at which Nazi leaders decided on the "final solution to the Jewish question" for the systematic annihilation of European Jewry.
  - The Attorney General, Avichai Mandelblit, opens an investigation into claims that the Israel Police used NSO spyware on Israeli's cellphones.
- 23 January
  - Israel and the United Arab Emirates establish a multimillion-dollar joint research and development fund to support private sector collaboration and investment in the next ten years.
  - The government decides to establish a state commission of inquiry into submarine and naval vessel purchases from German shipbuilder ThyssenKrupp for $2 billion that occurred under the government of former prime minister Benjamin Netanyahu for possible corruption and bribery.
- 24 January – An earthquake registering slightly more than 4.1 on the Richter scale centered northeast of Beit She'an, south of the Sea of Galilee, is felt throughout the country; no injuries or damage are reported.

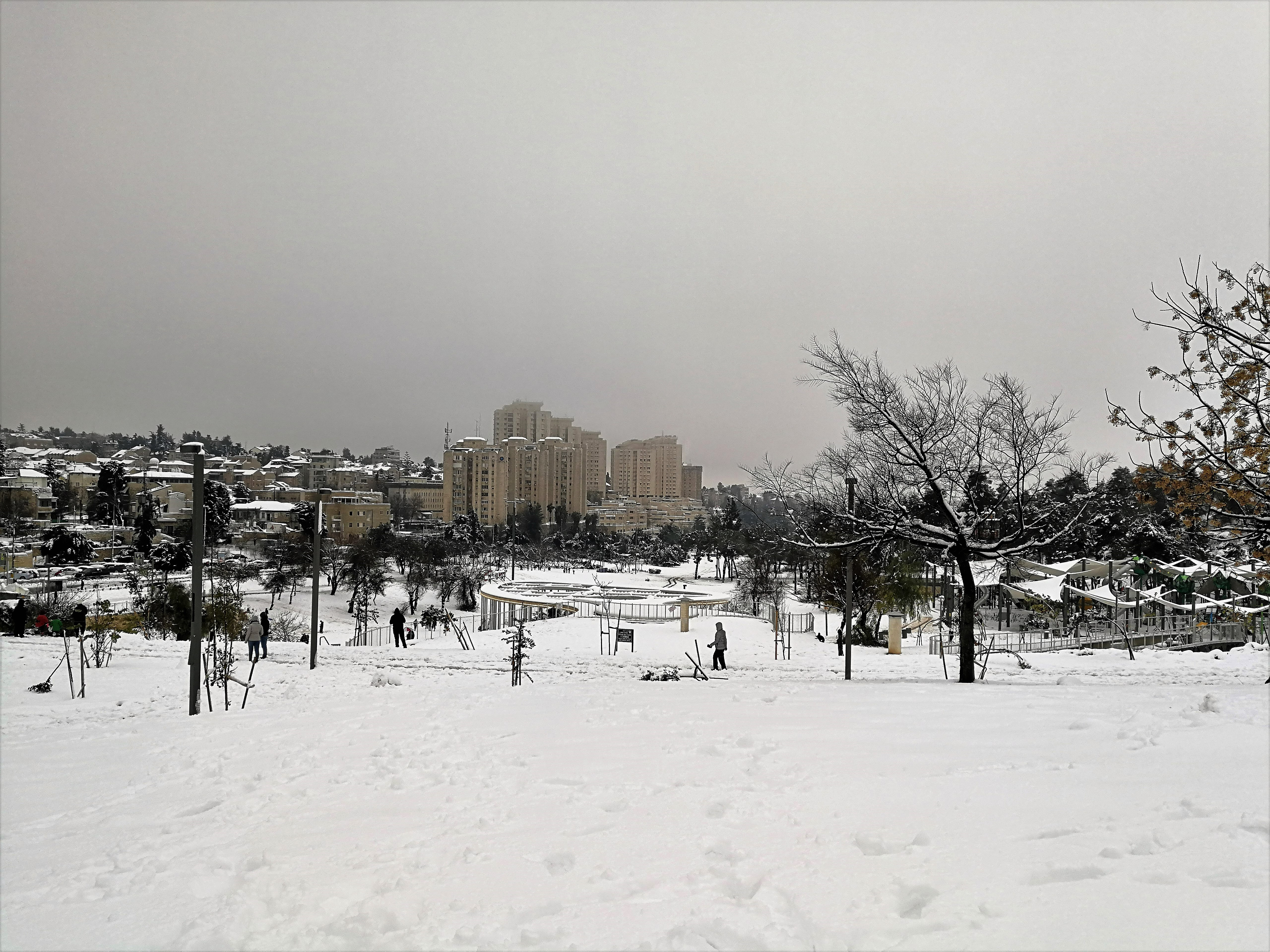
27 January: Storm Elpis covers Jerusalem with snow, as seen in Sacher Parks

- 26 January - The Health ministry approves the second round of booster dose of the COVID-19 vaccine for people aged above 18 years who have underlying medical conditions.
- 27 January – Storm Elpis blankets the cities Jerusalem and Safed and the mountains of northern and central Israel, with heavy snow.
- 30 January – President Herzog makes the first official visit of an Israeli president to the United Arab Emirates, meets with Emirati government and business leaders, and members of the Jewish community, and opens an Israel national day at Expo 2020 in Dubai.

=== February ===
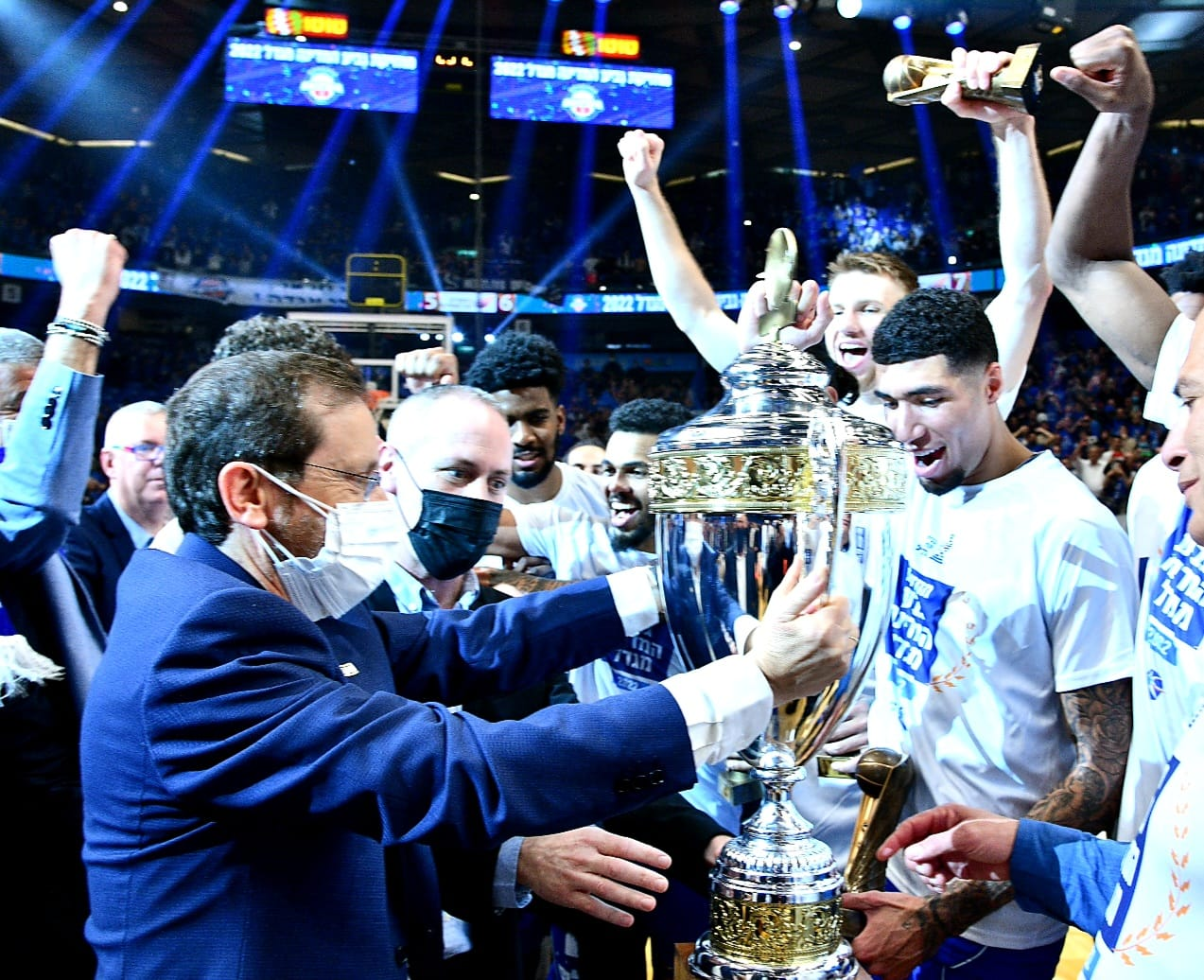
17 February: Isaac Herzog awards the State Basketball Cup to the 2021–22 season winner, Bnei Herzliya.

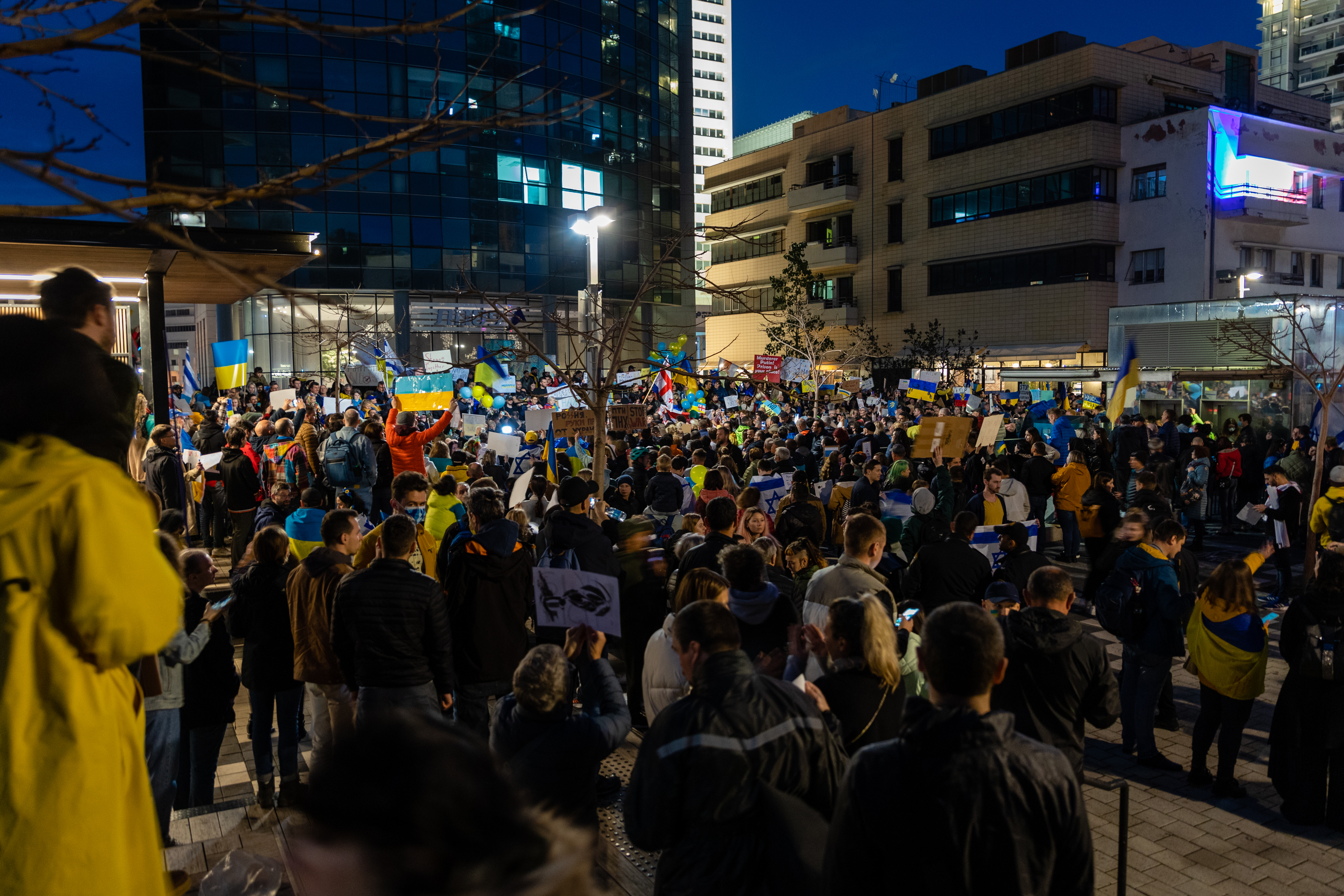
26 February: Protest rally in Tel Aviv against the Russian invasion of Ukraine.

- 1 February – Former minister and leader of the Shas Party, Aryeh Deri, is sentenced to a 12-month suspended prison term along with NIS 180,000 fine in a plea deal for tax offences.
- 2 February – Defense Minister Benny Gantz visits Bahrain in his first official visit to sign security agreements as the two nations further bolster their ties, and meets top Bahraini officials, including King Hamad bin Isa Al Khalifa.
- 4 to 20 February – Six athletes represent Israel at the 2022 Winter Olympics in Beijing, in Figure Skating, Short Track Speed Skating and Alpine Skiing.
- 8 February -
  - Israel says that the Syrian military fired an anti-aircraft missile towards its territory, which exploded in mid-air over the north of the country, triggering air raid sirens. However, Syrian state television reports that an Israeli Air Force airstrike occurred near Damascus.
  - The IDF says it has struck several Syrian air defense batteries and radars in response to the missile entering Israeli airspace.
  - Shin Bet officers kill three Palestinian al-Aqsa Martyrs' Brigades militants in the West Bank after opening fire on their vehicle. Israel says that the men were armed and were responsible for a series of drive-by shootings in recent weeks. Protests occur in the West Bank in response to the killings.
- 11 February –
  - Israeli State Department begins evacuating embassy staff and diplomats’ families from Kyiv, Ukraine and also orders a travel warning for all Israelis, saying that a large scale Russian offensive may occur soon.
  - Mossad announces the arrest of eight alleged Iranian spies for organizing a plot to kill an Israeli businessman in Istanbul in retaliation for the 2020 assassination of the chief of Iran's nuclear program, Mohsen Fakhrizadeh, in joint co-operation with counterpart Turkish intelligence agency (MIT) and several Turkish operatives were also among those arrested.
- 12 February – Bahraini authorities confirm that an Israeli military officer will be stationed inside the country as part of an upcoming international coalition consisting of 34 countries. This is the first time an Israeli officer has been sent to a military post in the Arab World.
- 13 February – One killed and two injured in a car bombing in Ashkelon, Israel, is most believed to be related to organized crime in Israel.
- 15 February – Prime Minister Bennett meets with King Hamad bin Isa Al Khalifa, senior government officials, businesspeople, and representatives of local Bahraini Jewish community, during the first visit to Bahrain by an Israeli premier, to discuss the development of trade, technology and innovation, and defense ties.
- 16 February –
  - Syrian state media agency SANA reports that Israel has fired missiles at the Syrian town of Zakiyah, with no recorded casualties.
  - The Speaker of the US House of Representatives, Nancy Pelosi, leads a congressional delegation on a visit to Israel and reaffirms the United States' "ironclad" guarantee of Israel's security in the face of threats from Iran posed by its nuclear program and support for terrorist organizations.
  - The Israel Innovation Authority and the Defense Ministry allocate some $62 million to develop the infrastructure for quantum computational ability and ultimately, a quantum computer.
- 17 February – Bnei Herzliya win the State Basketball Cup in the final match against Hapoel Tel Aviv with a score of 87–82.
- 18 February – Israel's Iron Dome fails to intercept a Hezbollah-operated military drone from Lebanon that penetrated seventy kilometers into Israeli airspace. The drone flew for forty minutes before returning to Lebanon. Israeli jets fly at very low altitude over Beirut in response to the incident.
- 21 February – Morocco's trade minister, Ryad Mezzour, and Israel's economy minister, Orna Barbivai, sign a trade deal in Rabat.
- 24 February –
  - Israel fires several missiles towards Damascus, Syria, killing three Syrian soldiers.
  - Foreign Minister Yair Lapid condemns the Russian invasion of Ukraine as "a grave violation of the international order" and offers humanitarian assistance to the citizens of Ukraine.
- 25 February –
  - President Zelenskyy calls for Israeli Prime Minister Naftali Bennett to serve as a mediator in talks between Ukraine and Russia.
  - 40,000 runners participate in the Tel Aviv Marathon; Vincent Kipsang Rono of Kenya and Bikaya Mantamar of Israel are the men's and women's winners, respectively.
- 26 February – Thousands of Israelis rally in Tel Aviv to protest Russia's invasion of Ukraine and to demand that the Israeli government take stronger measures in support of Ukraine.
- 27 February – Israeli Prime Minister Naftali Bennett offers to mediate a ceasefire between Russia and Ukraine.

=== March ===
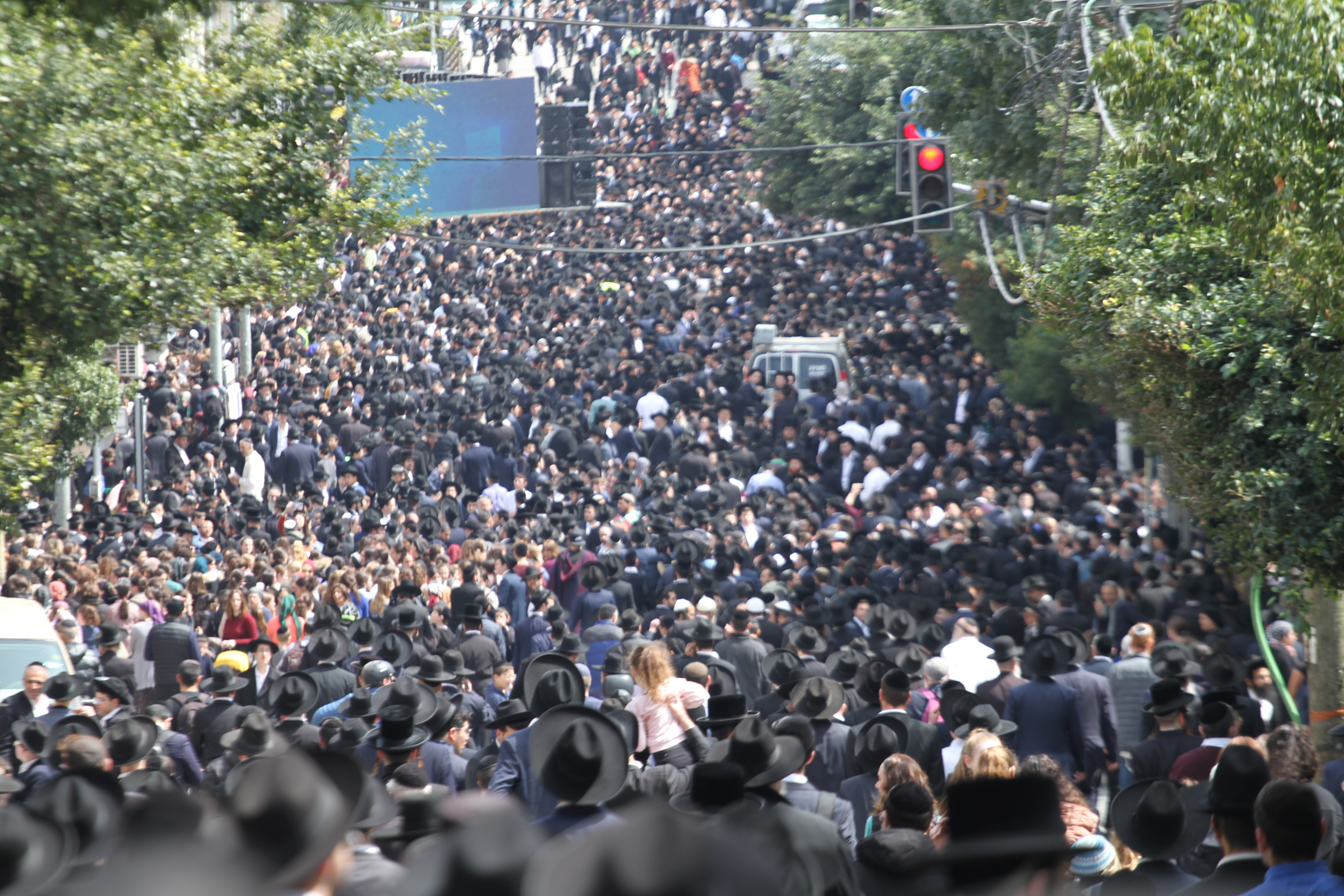
20 March: Part of the huge funeral procession for the revered Haredi rabbi, Chaim Kanievsky in Bnei Brak.

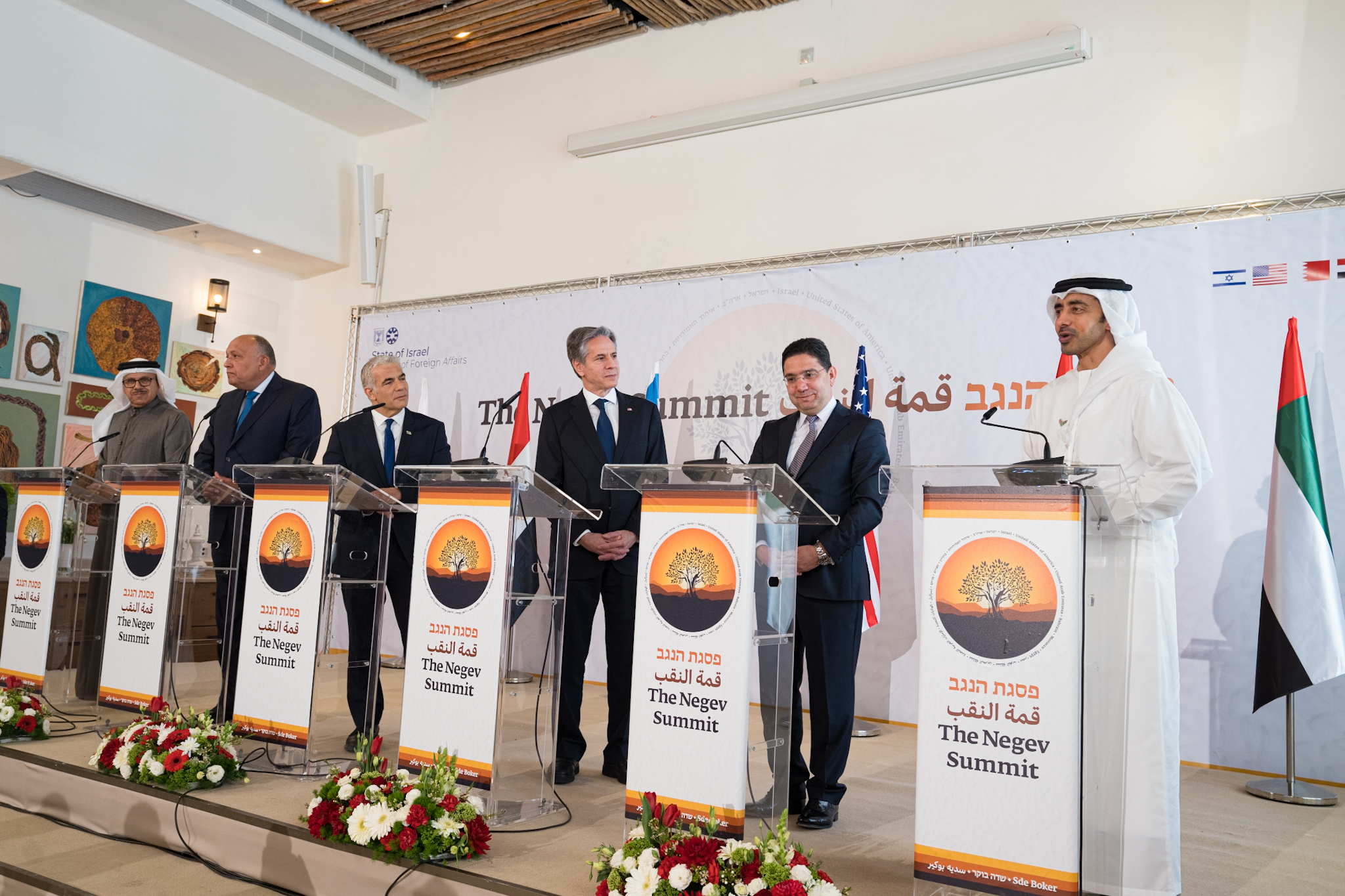
27 March: The foreign ministers of four Arab countries, Israel and the US Secretary of State, at the Negev Summit in Sde Boker.

- 1 March – The government relaxes almost all health restrictions related to the COVID-19 pandemic; only the rules regarding face masks in indoor public spaces, 'Green Pass' to enter old age homes, and PCR tests upon arrival for Israelis returning from abroad remain in place.
- 2 March – The newly elected Chancellor of Germany, Olaf Scholz, makes his first official visit to Israel.
- 5 March – Prime Minister Bennett flies to Moscow on Shabbat to meet with President Vladimir Putin regarding the Russian invasion of Ukraine; Bennet also speaks by phone with Ukrainian President Volodymyr Zelenskyy before and after the meeting, and flies to Berlin to meet with Olaf Scholz before returning to Israel.
- 9 March – President Herzog meets with the Turkish President, Recep Tayyip Erdoğan in Ankara, in what is perceived to be a renewal of relations between Israel and Turkey, which have been practically frozen since 2010.
- 11 March – Sheina Vaspi represents Israel at the 2022 Winter Paralympics in Alpine Skiing; she is the first Israeli athlete ever to compete at the Winter Paralympic Games.
- 20 March
  - Hundreds of thousands of mourners participate in the funeral procession of Rabbi Chaim Kanievsky in Bnei Brak, in one of the largest funerals in Israel's history.
  - Ukrainian President Volodymyr Zelenskyy addresses the Members of Knesset via Zoom, and invoking the memory of the Holocaust, calls on Israel to provide military support to his country in its struggle to resist the Russian invasion; the speech is also broadcast via large screen television, to thousands of protesters in Habima Square in Tel Aviv gathered to show support for Ukraine.
- 22 March – During an attack in Beersheba, four people are killed and two are injured in a stabbing and vehicle-ramming attack by an Islamic State supporter, before he is shot and killed by a civilian passer-by.
- 25 March – In the Jerusalem Marathon, Ageze Guadie from Israel and Valentina Versca, a refugee from the war in Ukraine, are the winners of the men's and women's races, respectively.
- 27 March
  - The Negev Summit takes place in Sde Boker, a conference between Israeli authorities and representatives of Egypt, Bahrain, Morocco and the United Arab Emirates. US Secretary of State Antony Blinken also attends the conference.
  - Two Islamic State gunmen kill two people and wound two others in Hadera before they are shot and killed by security forces.
- 29 March – A Palestinian kills five people in a mass shooting in Bnei Brak, Tel Aviv District.

=== April ===
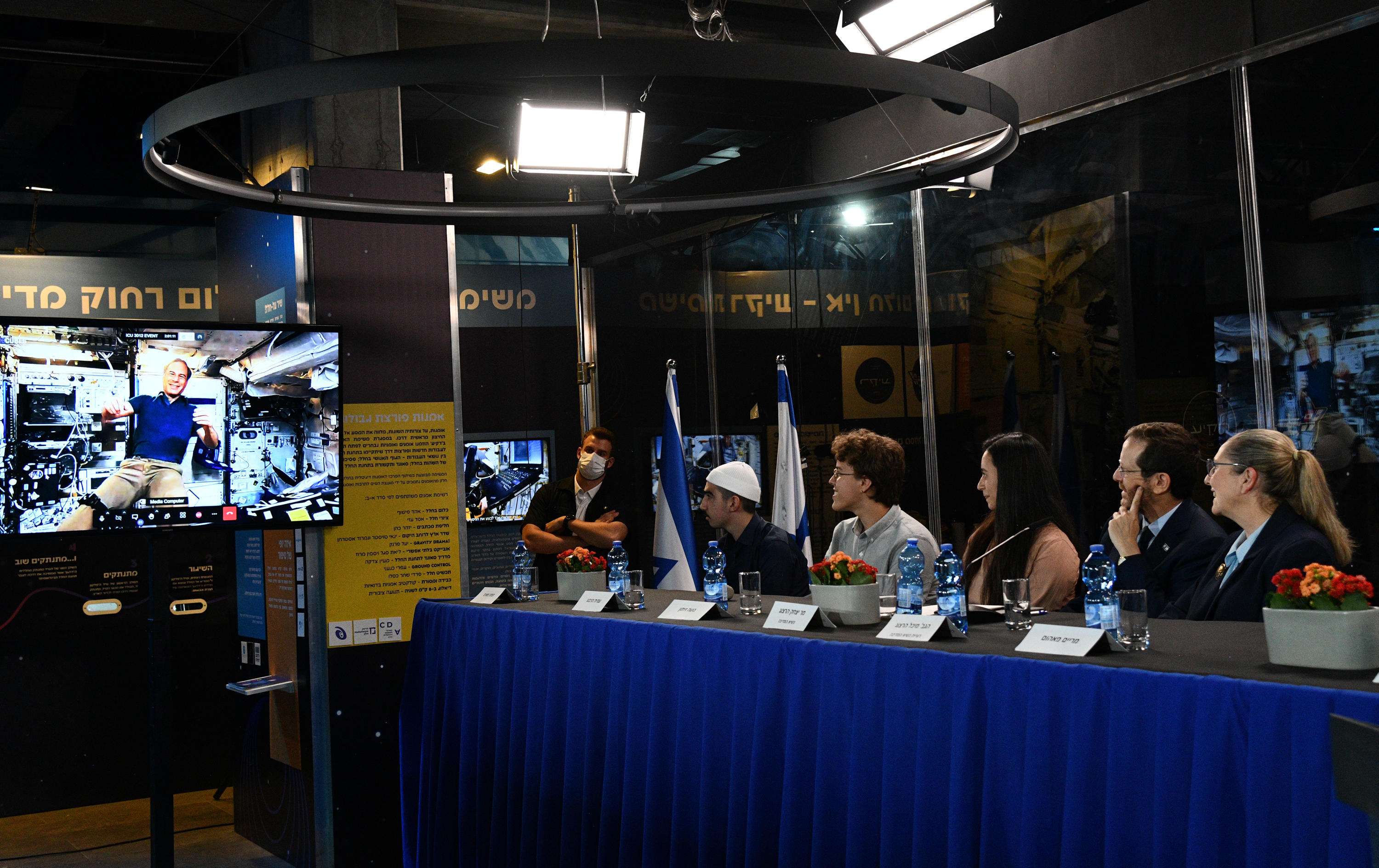
10 April: At the Israel Space Agency in Tel Aviv, students participating in space projects hold a video call along with President Herzog and his wife with astronaut Eytan Stibbe, who is aboard the International Space Station.

- 1 April –
  - Israel and the United Arab Emirates conclude negotiations for a free trade agreement, which will make 95 percent of traded products between the two countries customs-free and will include food, agricultural and cosmetic products, and medicines and medical equipment.
  - A Palestinian man is shot dead by Israeli security forces in clashes in Hebron.
- 2 April –
  - Three Palestinian Islamic Jihad members are killed and four Israeli soldiers are injured during a gunfight near Jenin in the West Bank.
  - Four Palestinians are arrested in clashes between Palestinians and Israel Police near the Damascus Gate in Jerusalem.
- 4 April – Foreign Minister Yair Lapid expresses horror over the mass civilian casualties in areas of Ukraine where Russian troops have withdrawn, including the Bucha massacre, and condemns them as a war crime.
- 6 April – MK Idit Silman, the governing coalition's parliamentary whip, resigns her position and withdraws her support for the government, leaving the Knesset split evenly between the coalition and opposition, and the government vulnerable to a vote of no-confidence that could bring it down.
- 7 April – A Palestinian gunman kills three people and injures nine others, in a mass shooting in Dizengoff Street, Tel Aviv; the attacker is later killed in a shootout with police.
- 9 April –
  - A Palestinian Islamic Jihad member is killed and 13 other people are injured in IDF raids on the refugee camp in Jenin, the hometown of the Tel Aviv mass shooter.
    - In retaliation for the Israeli raid, a group of around 100 Palestinian rioters vandalize Joseph's Tomb in Nablus. The gravestone and some other objects are damaged in the attack.
  - Syrian Arab News Agency reports that Israeli airstrikes have hit the northwestern city of Masyaf with no casualties being reported.
- 10 April –
  - The Supreme Court rules in favor of plaintiffs whose family members were killed in terror attacks during the Second Intifada that the Palestinian Authority can be held liable for attacks, due to its policy of paying stipends to convicted terrorists in Israeli jails and to the families of those killed during attacks on Israelis.
  - The Israel Defence Forces perform a raid in the West Bank city of Jenin, injuring two brothers of dead Palestinian militant Raad Hazem.
  - An Israel Border Police officer is injured in a stabbing attack at the entrance to the Cave of the Patriarchs in Hebron and the attacker is killed.
  - A Palestinian woman is killed in a confrontation with the Israel Defence Forces in Husan.
  - A man is killed by Israeli forces after reportedly throwing a Molotov cocktail in Al-Khader, Bethlehem Governorate.
- 11 April –
  - Palestinian gunmen shoot and wound two Breslov-Hasidic Jews trying to visit Joseph's Tomb, a shrine sacred to all three Abrahamic faiths in the city of Nablus, a day after it was vandalized and set on fire by a group of about a hundred Palestinian rioters before they were dispersed by Palestinian security forces.
  - Five people are injured when their car is stoned in East Jerusalem.
  - A Palestinian militant is shot dead after throwing an incendiary device at Israeli security forces in the West Bank.
- 15 April – Clashes erupt between Palestinians and Israeli police at the Al-Aqsa Mosque on the Temple Mount in Jerusalem, during which Palestinians inside the mosque threw objects and explosive devices at police; with over 150 Palestinians and three policemen are injured in the clashes.
- 18 April –
  - Israeli astronaut Eytan Stibbe, holds the first Passover Seder in space on the first night of the holiday, during his participation in the first privately funded and operated trip to the International Space Station to conduct science and technology experiments for a number of universities and startups in Israel.
  - Two Palestinians are seriously injured after being shot by Israeli security forces in the West Bank. The Israel Defense Forces say that the Palestinians were attacking Israeli troops.
- 19 April –
  - The Iron Dome intercepts a Hamas missile fired into Israel's Southern District from the Gaza Strip.
  - Israel fires missiles at a Hamas weapon depot in Gaza in response to the Hamas attack. No injuries are reported.
  - At least 40 Palestinians are injured after the IDF fires tear gas and rubber bullets at Palestinians protesting a march held by right-wing settlers near the former settlement of Homesh.
  - Iranian president Ebrahim Raisi warns Israel that Iran will respond to any hostile action taken against it.
- 20 April –
  - The Israel Defence Forces launches airstrikes on targets in the Gaza Strip in retaliation for a previous rocket attack launched from Gaza.
  - Marches organized by ultranationalist Itamar Ben-Gvir in the Arab neighbourhood in the old city of Jerusalem are interrupted by Israeli police, leading to skirmishes between protesters and police.
  - Altahrea Team, an Iraqi Shia hacker group launches major cyberattacks against numerous Israeli websites in retaliation for the assassination of Qasem Soleimani.
- 21 April – Iran arrests three alleged Israeli Mossad spies in Sistan and Baluchestan province, claiming that the spies are part of recent sensitive data leaks.
- 22 April –
  - At least 57 Palestinians are injured after Israeli police fire stun grenades and rubber bullets at a crowd of worshipers within the Al-Aqsa mosque compound in East Jerusalem, in response to stones and fireworks being thrown at Jewish worshipers.
  - Two rockets are launched into Israel from the Gaza Strip. One rocket lands in Sha'ar HaNegev and the other falls into the Beit Hanoun area, injuring one person.
- 25 April – A rocket is fired from Lebanon into Matzuva, Israel. Israel responds by firing dozens of shells at targets in Lebanon.
- 27 April –
  - Four Syrian soldiers are killed during airstrikes in Damascus launched by Israel at an Iranian-linked ammunition depot.
  - An armed Palestinian teenager is killed and three more are injured as Israeli soldiers raid a refugee camp in Jenin in an operation to arrest suspects involved in prior terror attacks in Israel. Fifteen others are arrested during raids in other parts of the West Bank.
- 29 April to 1 May – Israeli judokas win four medals at the 2022 European Judo Championships, Timna Nelson-Levy winning the gold in the 57-kilogram weight category, and Raz Hershko winning a silver and Shira Rishony and Gili Sharir each winning a bronze in their respective classes.
- 29 April –
  - Forty-two Palestinians are injured as the Israeli police storm the Al-Aqsa Mosque in Jerusalem in response to crowds within the mosque throwing rocks and fireworks in the direction of Jewish worshippers at the Western Wall.
  - An Israeli security guard stationed at a security booth is killed while protecting his fiancée in a shooting attack at the entrance to Ariel; two Palestinian gunmen are captured later by Israeli security forces.
- 30 April – Hamas warns that, if another attempt to storm the al-Aqsa Mosque is made by Israel, it will launch a war-like attack.

=== May ===
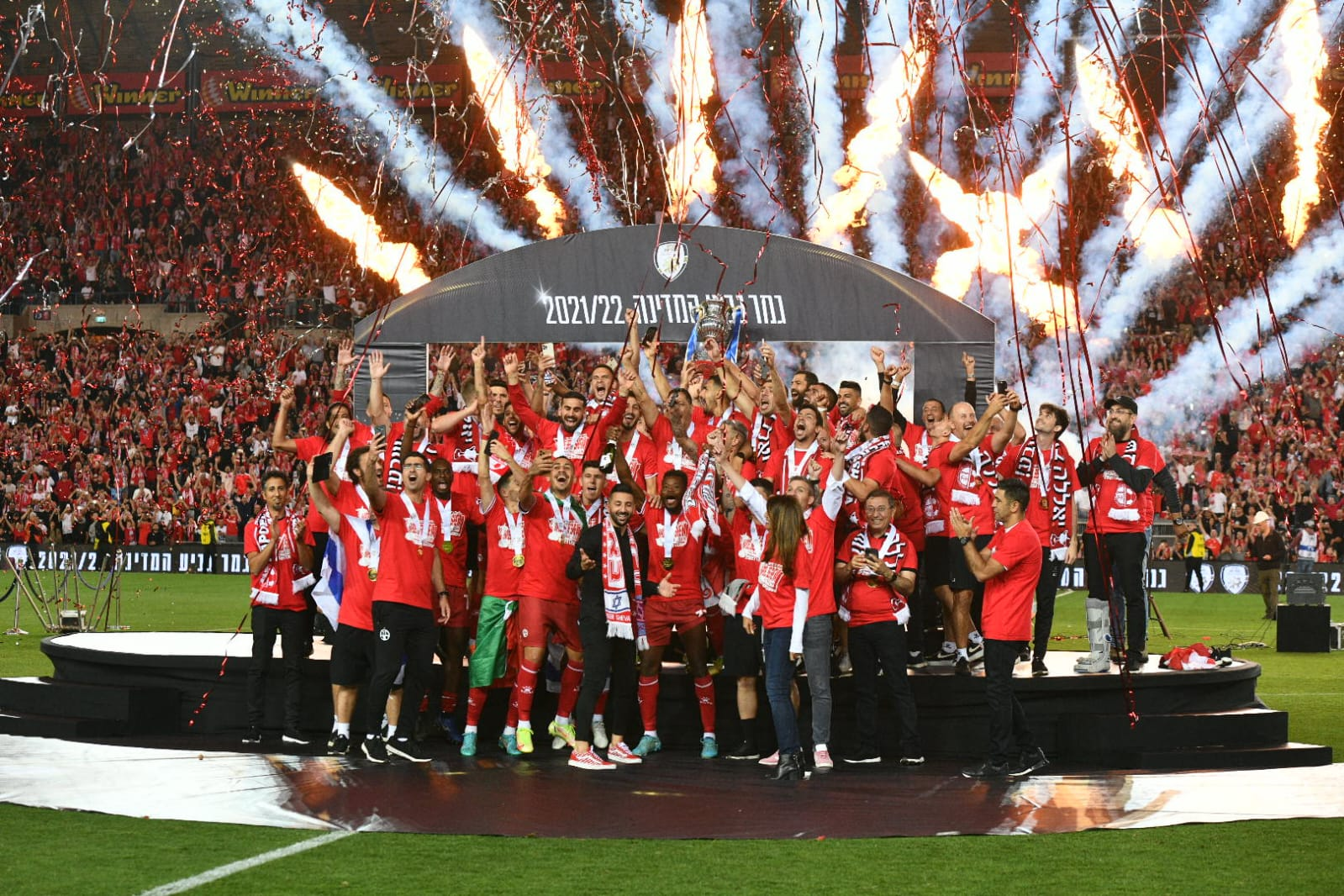
24 May: Hapoel Be'er Sheva celebrates its victory in the Israel State Cup football final.

- 1 May - The Islamic State claims via the Al-Naba newspaper that Israel killed a senior jihadist commander in the Egyptian Sinai Peninsula.
- 5 May -
  - The International Bible Contest takes place in Jerusalem on Independence Day; Hillel Cohen and Dvir Haim Martzbach jointly win first place.
  - Three people are killed in a stabbing and axing attack, and three are severely injured by two Palestinian terrorists, in El'ad, Central District.
- 8 May - Two Palestinians are killed by Israeli soldiers during confrontations in the West Bank, while an Israeli policeman is stabbed and wounded in Jerusalem, hours after the perpetrators of the El'ad stabbing are arrested.
- 11 May –
  - Al Jazeera journalist, Shireen Abu Akleh is shot and killed while covering an Israel Defense Forces raid on the West Bank city of Jenin.
  - A Palestinian is shot dead after charging at police officers in Jerusalem.
- 12 May – Michael Ben David represents Israel in the Eurovision Song Contest in Turin, Italy.
- 13 May – Syrian state media says that a missile attack from Israel hit Masyaf, Hama Governorate, killing five people and injuring seven others.
  - Israeli police commando Noam Raz is killed in a shootout with Palestinian Islamic Jihad gunmen in Jenin, West Bank.
  - Israeli riot police beat pallbearers and mourners at the funeral of journalist Shireen Abu Akleh, which was attended by thousands of Palestinians in East Jerusalem. White House Press Secretary Jen Psaki and the deputy speaker for UN Secretary-General António Guterres called the images of the attacks "deeply disturbing".
- 16 May – Maccabi Haifa wins the Israeli Premier League in Association football for the second time in a row, by attaining an insurmountable lead in points that other contenders cannot overcome in the final round.
- 19 May – MK Ghaida Rinawie Zoabi, of the Meretz party, resigns from the coalition, reducing it to a minority in the Knesset.
- 20 May –
  - Syrian state media says that Israeli airstrikes have killed three soldiers close to Damascus.
  - Israel announces its first suspected cases of monkeypox, both in people who had recently travelled to Europe.
- 21 May – A 17-year-old member of the Palestinian Islamic Jihad is killed and another is injured during clashes with Israeli soldiers in Kafr Dan, Jenin Governorate.
- 24 May –
  - Hapoel Be'er Sheva wins the 2021–22 Israel State Cup in association football at Teddy Stadium in Jerusalem, defeating Maccabi Haifa 3–1 on penalties after a 2–2 draw.
  - An independent investigation by CNN, aided by a newly released video by fellow Al Jazeera correspondent, points to late journalist Shireen Abu Akleh having been deliberately targeted by IDF soldiers.
- 25 May –
  - Clashes break out with the IDF after Palestinian rioters attack Joseph's Tomb in Nablus, West Bank. Fifteen Palestinians are injured and one teenager is killed.
  - Three Israelis are injured in a Palestinian stone-throwing attack in Huwara, West Bank.
- 26 May – The Iraqi parliament prohibits all attempts at normalizing relations with Israel with the punishment of life imprisonment or capital punishment. The law was introduced by Shia cleric Muqtada al-Sadr, whose party won the most seats in the last election.
- 30 May – Surinamese Foreign Minister Albert Ramdin says that Suriname will open an embassy in Jerusalem.

=== June ===
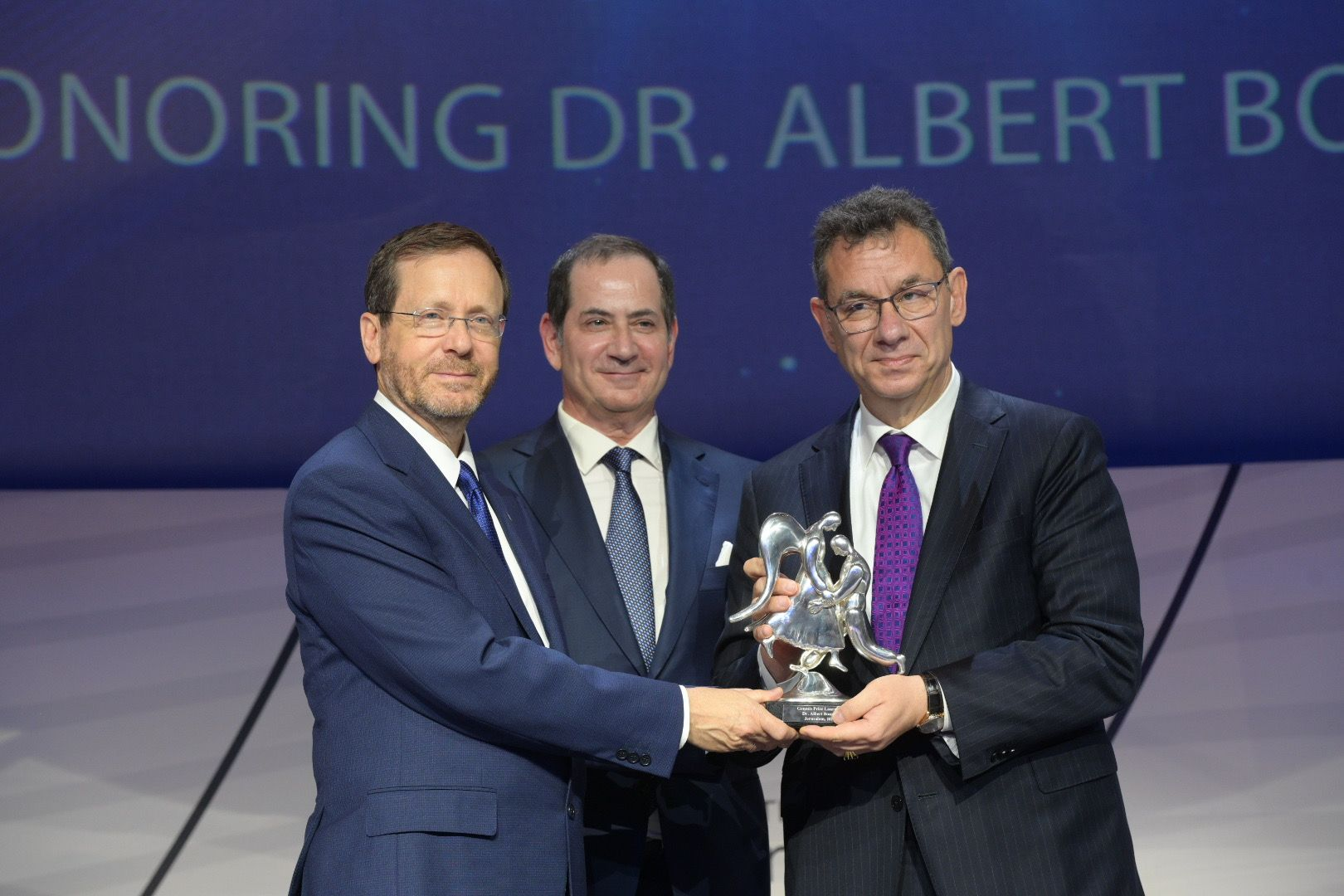
29 June: CEO of Pfizer, Albert Bourla (right), is awarded the Genesis Prize in Jerusalem.

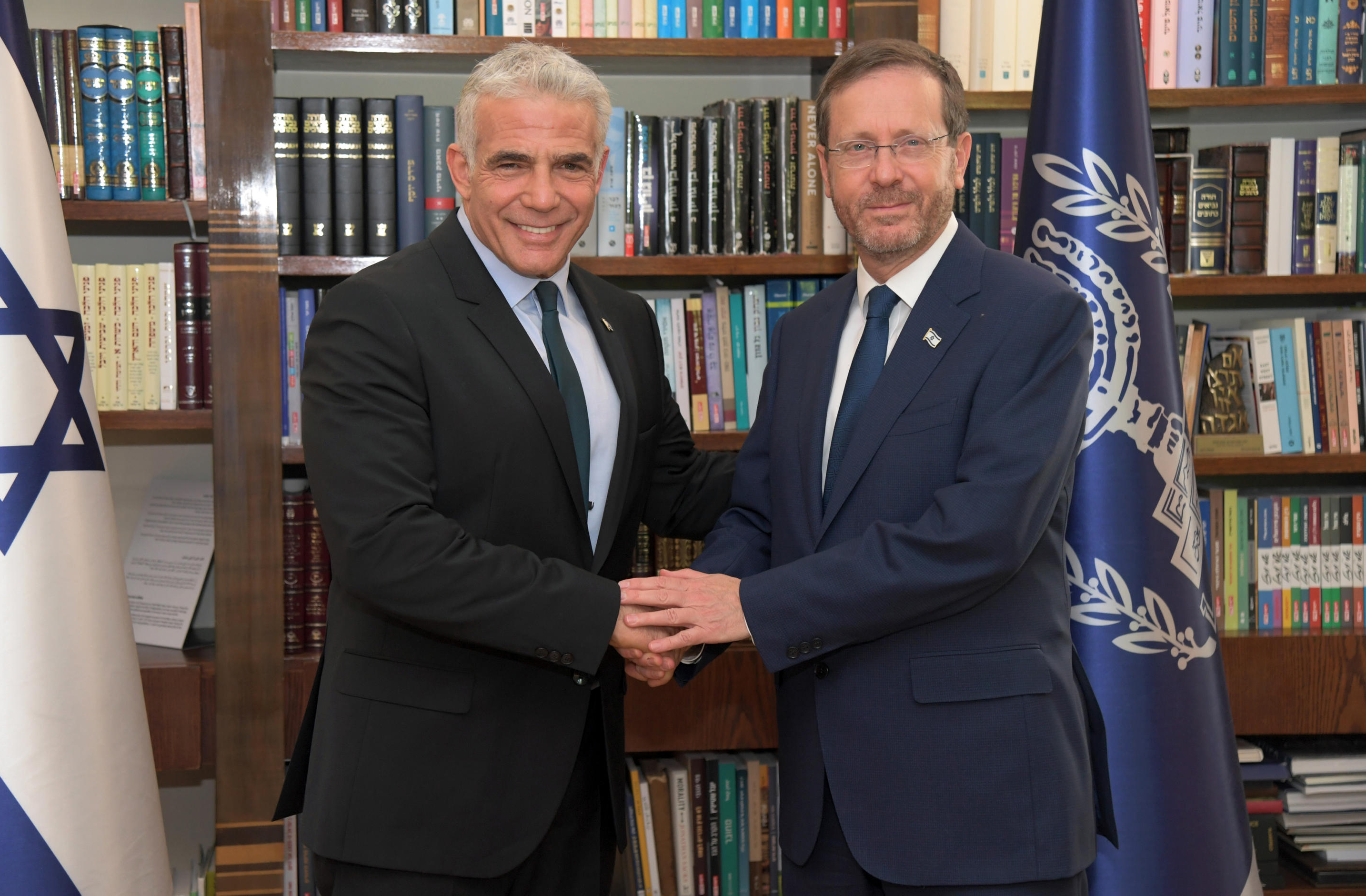
30 June: President Yitzhak Herzog, with incoming Prime Minister Yair Lapid at the President's official residence.

- 1 June – A Palestinian man is killed and two others are injured after the IDF raided the town of Ya'bad to demolish the house of the perpetrator of the Bnei Brak shootings, following a confrontation by residents. A woman holding a knife is also shot and killed near the Al-Arroub refugee camp in the occupied West Bank.
- 7 June – An independent inquiry established by the U.N. Human Rights Council following the 2021 Israel–Palestine crisis issues a report accusing Israel of seeking "complete control" over the Palestinian territories, and of granting "different civil status, rights and legal protection" to the country's Arab citizens.
- 13 June – European Union leader Ursula von der Leyen, and Italian Prime Minister Mario Draghi visit Israel for talks focused on increased energy cooperation, especially the export of Israeli natural gas to Europe.
- 15 June – the Energy Ministers of Egypt, Israel and the European Union sign an agreement in Cairo to increase natural-gas sales to European countries seeking alternative sources to lessen their dependence on Russian energy supplies.
- 17 June –
  - Israel intercepts a rocket fired by suspected Hamas militants over Ashkelon. The Israel Defense Forces respond by launching airstrikes on military targets in Gaza.
  - Three Palestinian militants, including an Izz ad-Din al-Qassam Brigades commander, are killed by Israeli soldiers during a raid in Jenin, West Bank.
- 19 June – A Palestinian man is shot and killed by Israeli forces while attempting to cross the West Bank separation barrier.
- 20 June – Prime Minister Bennett and Alternate Prime Minister Yair Lapid announce that have decided to dissolve the coalition and submit a bill to dissolve the Knesset, leading to a fifth election in less than four years; Lapid will become the caretaker prime minister until a new government is formed.
- 21 June –
  - In response to recent terrorist attacks, Israel begins reinforcing a section of the northern part of its West Bank security barrier with a concrete wall.
  - A Palestinian man is stabbed and killed by an Israeli settler in the occupied West Bank.
- 23 June – Turkey arrests ten alleged Iranian intelligence agents and charges them with plotting to murder Israeli tourists in hotels.
- 25 June – Mohammad Abdallah Hamed, a 16-year-old Palestinian teenager dies in Israeli custody after being shot yesterday by soldiers in Silwad, West Bank.
- 26 June – The Knesset advances a bill which would ban indicted politicians from becoming Prime Minister of Israel, that if passed, it would prevent Benjamin Netanyahu from returning to that post.
- 29 June – Albert Bourla, CEO of Pfizer, is presented the Genesis Prize by President Isaac Herzog in Jerusalem for his leadership in delivering a vaccine against COVID-19.
- 30 June – The Knesset approves a bill to disband itself and schedules new elections for 1 November; Foreign Minister and Alternate Prime Minister Yair Lapid succeeds Naftali Bennett as prime minister until a new coalition is formed.

=== July ===
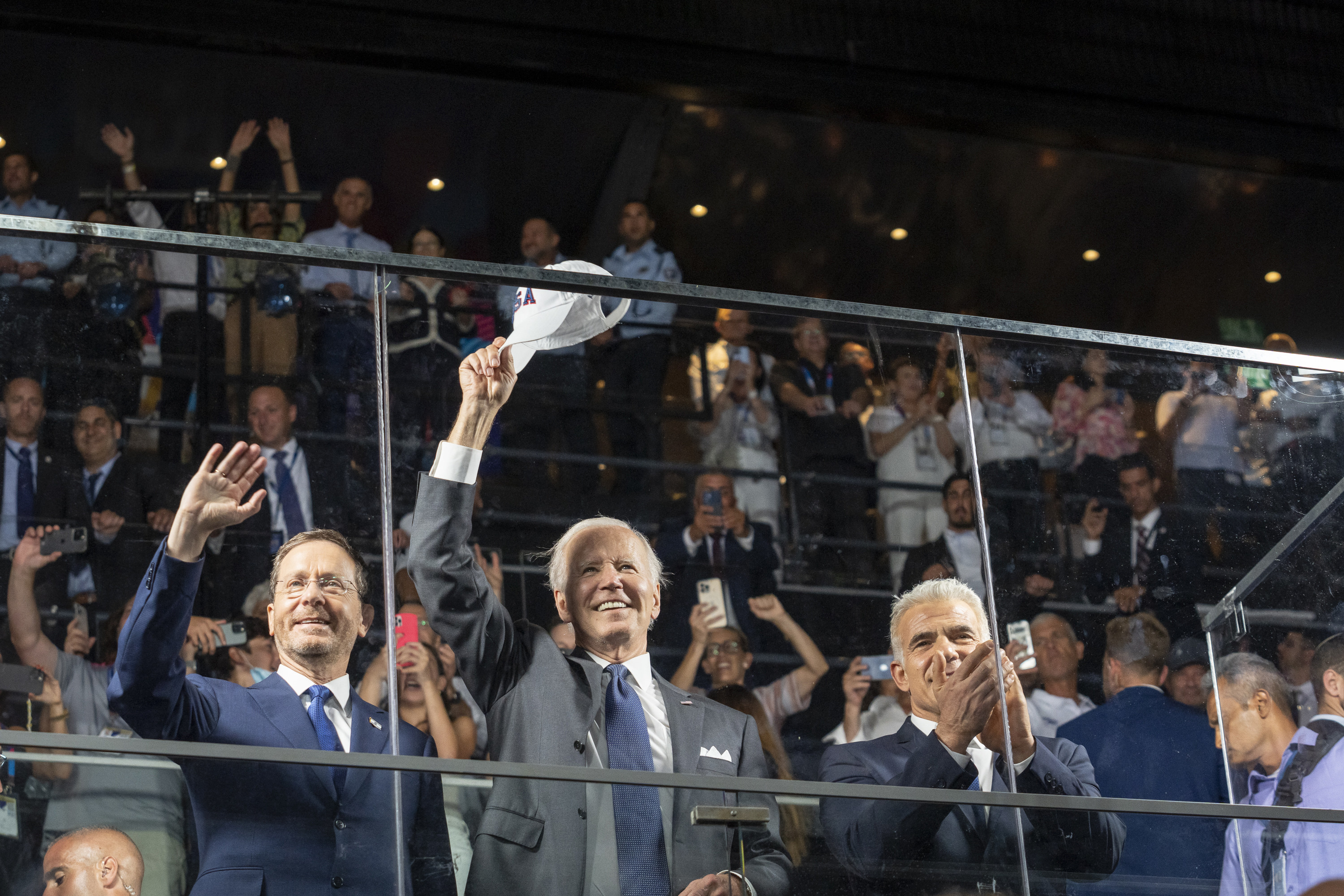
14 July: US President Joe Biden, together with President Isaac Herzog and Prime Minister Yair Lapid, at the opening ceremony of the 21st Maccabiah Games.

- 2 July − Hezbollah launches three drones from Lebanon at an Israeli vessel operating in the Karish gas field off Israel's coast, which are all downed by the Israeli Airforce; Lebanon and Israel are engaged in US-mediated negotiations to delineate a shared maritime border.
- 5 July −
  - An Israeli man is seriously injured in a stabbing and suspected terror attack on the road between Bnei Brak and Giv'at Shmuel.
  - Russia orders the Jewish Agency for Israel to stop any and all activities in the country, allegedly claiming that the organisation was illegally collecting information on Russian citizens.
- 4 to 7 July – Young athletes from 47 countries compete in the 2022 European Athletics U18 Championships held in Jerusalem at the Hebrew University Stadium.
- 10 July - Benny Gantz and Gideon Saar form a political alliance to compete against Yair Lapid and Benjamin Netanyahu.
- 16 July - IDF launches more than a dozen missiles against two Hamas targets in the Gaza Strip, following a number of rockets fired overnight from Gaza into Israel, causing severe damage. No casualties were reported and no civilian structures were targeted or hit.
- 7 to 17 July – Israeli athletes compete in ten sports at the 2022 World Games in Birmingham, United States, winning seven gold, three silver and four bronze medals, and attaining eleventh place overall at the Games.
  - 12–13 July − Daria Atamanov wins two gold medals and a silver for Israel in rhythmic gymnastics at the World Games.
- 10 July – Doron Almog is appointed Chairman of the Jewish Agency for Israel.
- 14 July to 15 July – State visit of US President Joe Biden to Israel
  - 14 July – The United States and Israel agree on the extension of a 10-year, $38 billion US defense package to Israel and commit to preventing Iran from obtaining a nuclear weapon.
  - 15 July – President Biden and Prime Minister Lapid attend the first meeting of I2U2 forum, together with the president of the United Arab Emirates, Mohammed bin Zayed Al Nahyan, and the Prime Minister of India, Narendra Modi, in a virtual conference during which the four countries agreed to collaborate further on issues including food security, clean energy, technology and trade, and reaffirm their support for the Abraham Accords.
- 14 to 26 July − The 21st Maccabiah Games
  - 14 July – The opening ceremony of the 21st Maccabiah Games are held at Teddy Stadium in Jerusalem, with US President Biden, and Israeli President Herzog and Prime Minister Lapid amongst the 30,000 dignitaries and spectators in attendance.
- 17 July -
  - The Israeli Health Ministry confirms three cases of the Omicron BA.2.75 variant in travelers abroad.
  - Former Minister of Foreign Affairs and senior adviser to Supreme Leader Ali Khamenei, Kamal Kharazi, confirms that Iran now has the capabilities to develop and build a nuclear weapon but says that "there has been no decision by Iran to build one". Kharazi also warns that Iran will "directly respond" to Israel if it is attacked.
- 21 July - The Ministry of Justice of Russia opens a court case to close the Jewish Agency for Israel, the main agency allowing the aliyah of Jews to Israel. Israel condemns the court case, claiming it is a response to Israel's stance on the 2022 Russian invasion of Ukraine.
- 22 July - An Israeli airstrike kills three Syrian soldiers, injures seven others and destroys an Iranian weapons depot near Damascus.
- 24 July -
  - Two Palestinian men, Muhamad Azizi and Abdul Rahman Sobh are killed and 12 others are injured during a raid by Israeli soldiers in Nablus, West Bank.
  - Iran's Supreme National Security Council announces that their intelligence ministry has arrested an Israeli cell hours before they were to conduct attacks on several sites in Isfahan, including a major nuclear facility.
- 28 July - Iranian police arrest the alleged leader and four other members of a spy network suspected to be affiliated with Mossad.
- 29 July -
  - A 16-year-old Palestinian affiliated with Fatah is killed during clashes with Israeli soldiers in Al-Mughayyir, near Ramallah.
  - The first U.S. case of polio since 2013, reported in Rockland County, New York, is connected to traces of vaccine-derived viruses from Israel.

=== August ===
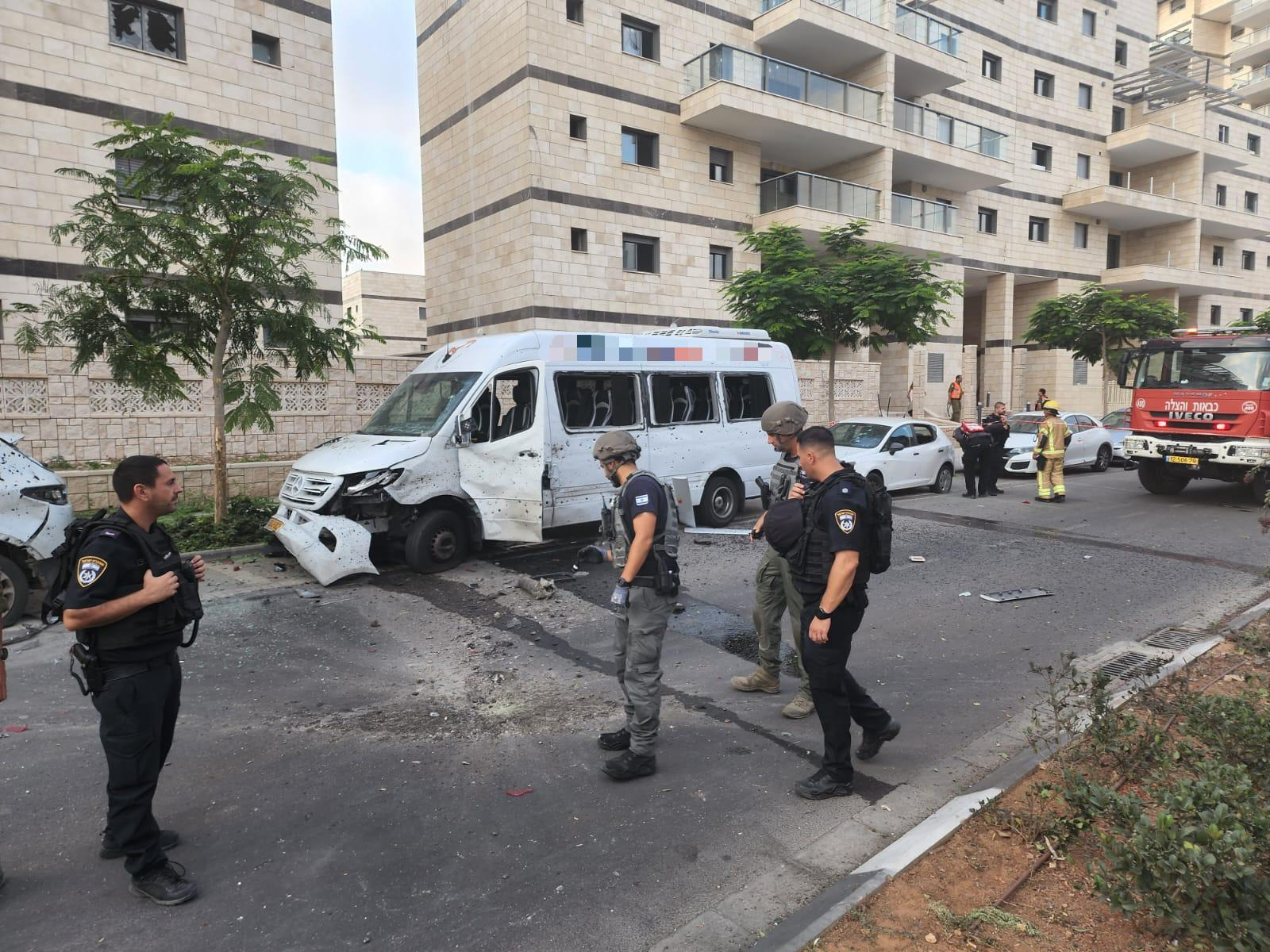
6 August: A Palestinian rocket fired by Palestinian Islamic Jihad in Gaza strikes a residential area in the southern city of Ashkelon.

- 1 August – Kobi Shabtai makes the first official visit to Morocco of an Israel Police Commissioner to meet with senior Moroccan police and government officials for discussions regarding strengthening operational, intelligence, and investigative cooperation between the two countries.
- 5–7 August – Israel launches Operation Breaking Dawn in response to threats from Palestinian Islamic Jihad with airstrikes against the Gaza Strip, killing Islamic Jihad leader Tayseer Jabari and other high ranking PIJ commanders; Islamic Jihad fires about 1,000 rockets into Israel from Gaza, with 96 percent intercepted by Israel's air defenses and about 160 falling short within Gaza.
- 7 August – Israel and the Islamic Jihad agree to a ceasefire agreement for the Gaza Strip.
- 9 August – Ibrahim al-Nabulsi, local head of the al-Aqsa Martyrs' Brigades, and two other people are killed during a raid by Israeli soldiers in Nablus. At least 40 others are injured.
- 14 August – A Palestinian gunman opens fire inside a bus in Jerusalem's Old City, injuring eight people, two of them critically. The suspect is arrested in an Israeli police raid on Silwan.
- 15 August – At the European Championships in Munich, Israel's men's marathon team wins the gold medal, Ethiopian-born Israeli runners Marhu Teferi and Gashau Ayale win a silver and bronze medal, respectively in the individual marathon, and Kenyan-born Israeli runner Lonah Chemtai Salpeter wins Israel's fourth medal, taking bronze in the 10,000-meter run and setting an Israeli record.
- 16 August – Anastasia Gorbenko wins the gold medal for Israel in the 200-meter individual medley at the European Aquatics Championships in Rome, for a second consecutive year.
- 18 August – Israel and Turkey announce the resumption of full diplomatic relations, with the exchange of ambassadors for the first time since 2018.
- 21 August – Artem Dolgopyat wins the Floor gold medal at the European Artistic Gymnastics Championship in Munich.
- 22 August – The Bank of Israel raises its benchmark interest rate from 1.25% to 2.0%, the largest increase in two decades, in an effort to curb inflation, which has exceeded 5% over the past year.

=== September ===
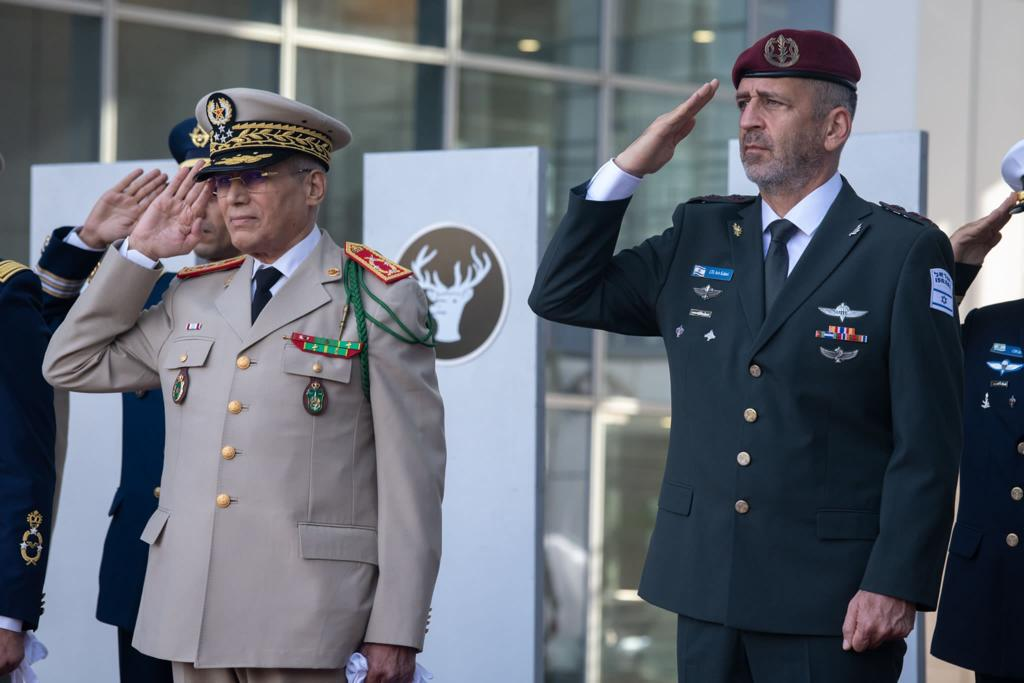
13 September: Lieutenant General Belkhir El-Farouk, Inspector General of the Royal Moroccan Armed Forces is welcomed to Israel by an honor guard headed by the Chief of Staff of the Israeli Army, Aviv Kochavi

- 1 September –
  - Israeli Air Force jets fire four missiles at Aleppo International Airport, hitting the runway and several warehouses allegedly containing Iranian rockets, according to the Syrian Observatory for Human Rights. No casualties have been reported.
  - Two Palestinian men are killed in clashes with Israeli soldiers in the occupied West Bank. One of the men was killed by Palestinian gunfire, according to the Palestinian Health Ministry.
- 2 September –
  - The German government confirms that the families of the Israeli athletes killed at the 1972 Munich Olympics will receive a total of $28 million in compensation and agrees to acknowledge the failures that authorities made at the time.
  - A Palestinian man stabs and injures an Israeli soldier near Kiryat Arba in the West Bank. The attacker is shot dead by security forces.
- 4 September – Six Israeli soldiers and a civilian driver are injured when three gunmen open fire on a bus in Nablus, in the occupied West Bank. Two of the attackers are later arrested.
- 4–6 September – President Isaac Herzog and First Lady Michal Herzog pay a state visit to Germany to participate in the 50th anniversary memorial for the 1972 Munich Olympics massacre; President Herzog meets with German President Frank-Walter Steinmeier, Chancellor Olaf Scholz and other senior officials, addresses the Bundestag and visits the Bergen-Belsen concentration camp.
- 12–16 September – Delegations from 25 countries, including Chiefs of Staff and commanders from militaries from around the world, attend the first International Operational Innovation Conference; for the first time, an Arab military head, Lieutenant General Belkhir El-Farouk, Inspector General of the Royal Moroccan Armed Forces makes an official visit to Israel.
- 14 September – Two al-Aqsa Martyrs' Brigade members; Ahmad Abed, 23, and Abdul Rahman Abed, 22, and an Israeli soldier are killed during a shootout at a checkpoint in Jenin, in the occupied West Bank.
- 17 September –
  - Five Syrian soldiers are killed in missile strikes launched by the Israeli Air Force near Damascus.
  - A large sinkhole opens on the Ayalon Highway in Tel Aviv, disrupting traffic for thousands of commuters and prompting the closure of several lanes and a nearby exit, but resulting in no injuries or accidents despite occurring on one of Israel's busiest traffic arteries.
- 20 September –
  - A civilian is killed and another is critically injured during clashes between Al-Qassam Brigades' supporters and Palestinian authorities outside a police station in Nablus, in the occupied West Bank, following the arrest of two militants.
  - An 84-year-old woman is murdered in Holon, Israel in a suspected terror attack. The Qalqilya-born suspect is found dead, presumably by suicide, inside an abandoned building in Tel Aviv.
- 28 September – Four Palestinians are killed and 44 others are injured in an IDF raid on the Jenin refugee camp in West Bank. The brother of the 2022 Tel Aviv shooting's perpetrator is among those killed.

=== October ===
- 1 October – An 18-year-old Palestinian man is killed by Israeli soldiers in East Jerusalem, making him the 100th Palestinian killed in the West Bank this year. It is the deadliest toll of Palestinians killed there by Israeli raids since 2015.
- 2 October – A taxi driver is shot and wounded by Palestinian militants near Elon Moreh in the West Bank. A demonstration by local Israeli settlers to protest the incident is attacked with gunfire, wounding a soldier. Palestinian militant group; Lion's Den claims responsibility.
- 3 October – Two Palestinians are killed and another is wounded as Israeli soldiers open fire against a vehicle in the Jalazone refugee camp, Ramallah and al-Bireh Governorate, in the occupied West Bank.
- 5 October – Israeli soldiers surround a house in the village of Deir al-Hatab, killing a man and wounding four residents and two Palestinian Satellite Channel journalists who were covering the operation.
- 7 October –
  - During two separate shootings, a 14-year-old Palestinian boy is killed by Israeli soldiers in a village near Ramallah, in the West Bank, while a 17-year-old Palestinian boy is killed and his mother wounded when Israeli soldiers open fire at residents during confrontations with Israeli settlers.
  - Yoel Lhanghal, an 18-year-old Bnei Menashe immigrant from India is beaten and stabbed to death by a group of young people in Kiryat Shmona.
- 8 October –
  - Two 17-year-old Palestinians; Ahmad Mohammad Daraghmeh and Mahmoud as-Sous are killed and 11 more injured during a raid when three gunmen open fire in a mass shooting at the Jenin refugee camp, West Bank.
  - A shooting attack by Al-Aqsa Martyrs' Brigades militants kills an Israeli soldier and injures two police officers and a guard at the Shu'fat refugee camp in East Jerusalem.
- 11 October –
  - An Israeli soldier is killed by two Lions' Den gunmen near the Israeli settlement of Shavei Shomron, in the occupied West Bank.
  - Israel and Lebanon announces to have agreed to a U.S.-brokered agreement that will allow both countries to exploit gas fields in the eastern Mediterranean Sea, thereby ending decades of maritime border disputes between the two nations.
- 26 October – President Isaac Herzog begins an official visit to the United States.
- 12 October – An 18-year-old Palestinian is killed and another is injured near Hebron in an IDF raid on the Al-Arroub refugee camp.
- 14 October – Two people are killed and five others are injured in an exchange of fire between Israeli soldiers and Palestinian militants in Jenin, West Bank, following a raid conducted by the former. The Israeli soldiers aimed to capture a Hamas operative suspected of involvement in recent shootings; he was subsequently detained and taken into custody.
- 18 October – Australian Foreign Minister Penny Wong confirms that Australia will no longer recognise West Jerusalem as the capital of Israel until peace negotiations are finalised.
- 23 October – Tamer al-Kilani, a founding member of the Lions' Den militant group, is killed by a bomb planted on a motorcycle in Nablus, West Bank.
- 25 October – Israeli soldiers raid a Lions' Den headquarter in Nablus, West Bank, killing three militants, including one of the group's founders. Two Palestinian civilians are also killed in nearby areas. Protests later occur in the town of Nabi Salih, resulting in a Palestinian man being killed by Israeli soldiers.
- 27 October –
  - Israel carries out airstrikes near Damascus, Syria, killing four pro-Iranian fighters.
  - Representatives of Israel and Lebanon sign a U.S.-brokered agreement that establishes a maritime boundary and ends a dispute over the maritime border between the two countries, opening the way for each to exploit the natural resources of the area.
- 28 October – Two Palestinian Civil Defence members, Imad Abu Rasheed, 47, and Ramzi Zabara, 35, are killed, and another is injured when Israeli soldiers open fire on a vehicle at a checkpoint in Nablus, West Bank.
- 29 October – A Palestinian gunman kills a 49 year old Israeli settler in Kiryat Arba, Hebron, and injures four others, including a Palestinian paramedic, before being killed by security forces.
- 30 October – Five Israeli soldiers are injured during a vehicle-ramming attack at a checkpoint in Jericho, in the occupied West Bank. The perpetrator is shot dead by police.

=== November ===
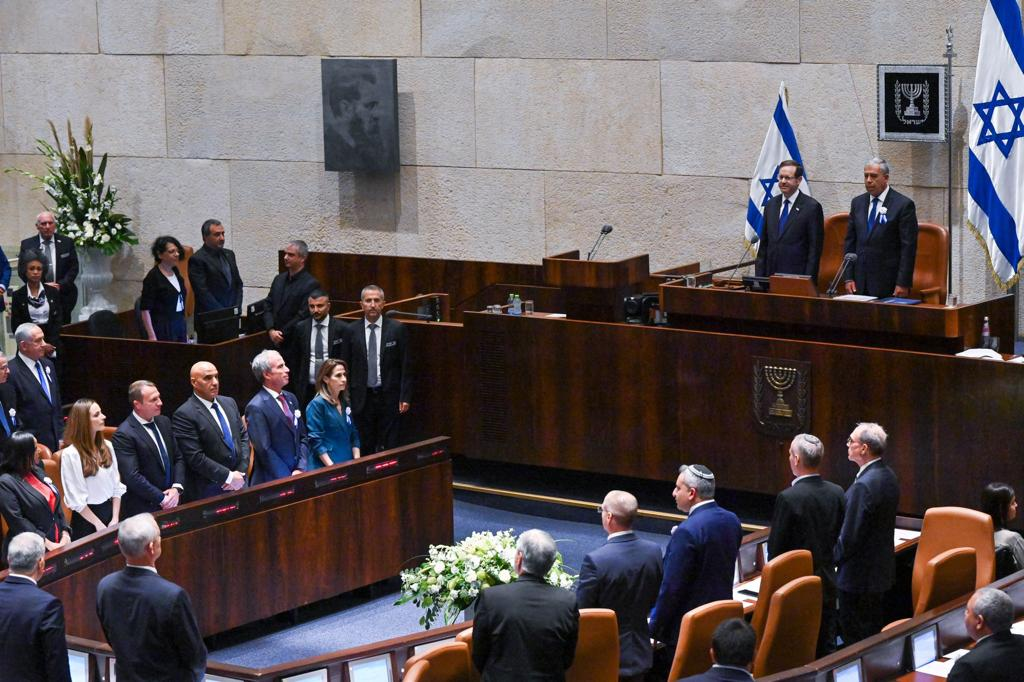
15 November: The swearing-in ceremony of the members of the newly elected 25th Knesset is held.

- 1 November – Elections for the 25th Knesset take place and a right-wing bloc of political parties led by former Prime Minister Benjamin Netanyahu wins a majority needed to form a government.
- 3 November –
  - Three Palestinians are killed during raids by Israeli soldiers in the West Bank, while another is killed in East Jerusalem after stabbing and injuring a police officer.
  - A 14-year-old Jewish girl is in critical condition after being shot in the head by a Palestinian sniper in Kiryat Arba, in the occupied West Bank.
- 7 November – Addressing world leaders at the UN COP27 climate conference in Sharm el-Sheikh, President Herzog warns of imminent climate catastrophe for Middle East and urges regional cooperation to avert disaster.
- 9 November – A Palestinian teenager is killed and three others are injured in Nablus as clashes occur between Israeli soldiers and the Al-Aqsa Martyrs' Brigade at Joseph's Tomb when the latter allegedly opened fire on Jewish worshippers.
- 11 November – The United Nations General Assembly Fourth Committee adopts a resolution to request the opinion of the International Court of Justice (ICJ) on the effects of the Israeli occupation of the Palestinian territories. It will then proceed to the United Nations General Assembly for final approval.
- 11 November – After consulting with representatives of the parties who have won seats in the 25th Knesset, President Isaac Herzog officially grants the mandate to form Israel's 37th government to Likud leader Benjamin Netanyahu.
- 13 November – Israel launches missile strikes on Shayrat Airbase in Homs Governorate, central Syria, killing two soldiers and injuring three others, according to Syrian state television.
- 14 November – Israeli forces kill a 15-year-old Palestinian girl in the occupied West Bank.
- 15 November –
  - A Palestinian kills three Israelis and wounds three others in a vehicle-ramming and stabbing attack in the Ariel settlement.
  - The swearing-in ceremony for the newly elected members of the 25th Knesset is held.
- 16 November – A plaza in Jerusalem's Kiryat Ha'Yovel neighborhood is named in honor of Aristides de Sousa Mendes, a Portuguese diplomat who saved thousands of Jews during the Holocaust.
- 17 November – At least 21 people are killed in a fire at a residential building in Jabalia, Gaza Strip.
- 21 November - A court in Tel Aviv rules that former Israeli Prime Minister Ehud Olmert committed defamation against the family of prime minister-designate Benjamin Netanyahu by claiming that members of Netanyahu's family are mentally ill and orders Olmert to pay the sum of ₪66,700 (U.S.$18,000).
- 23 November -

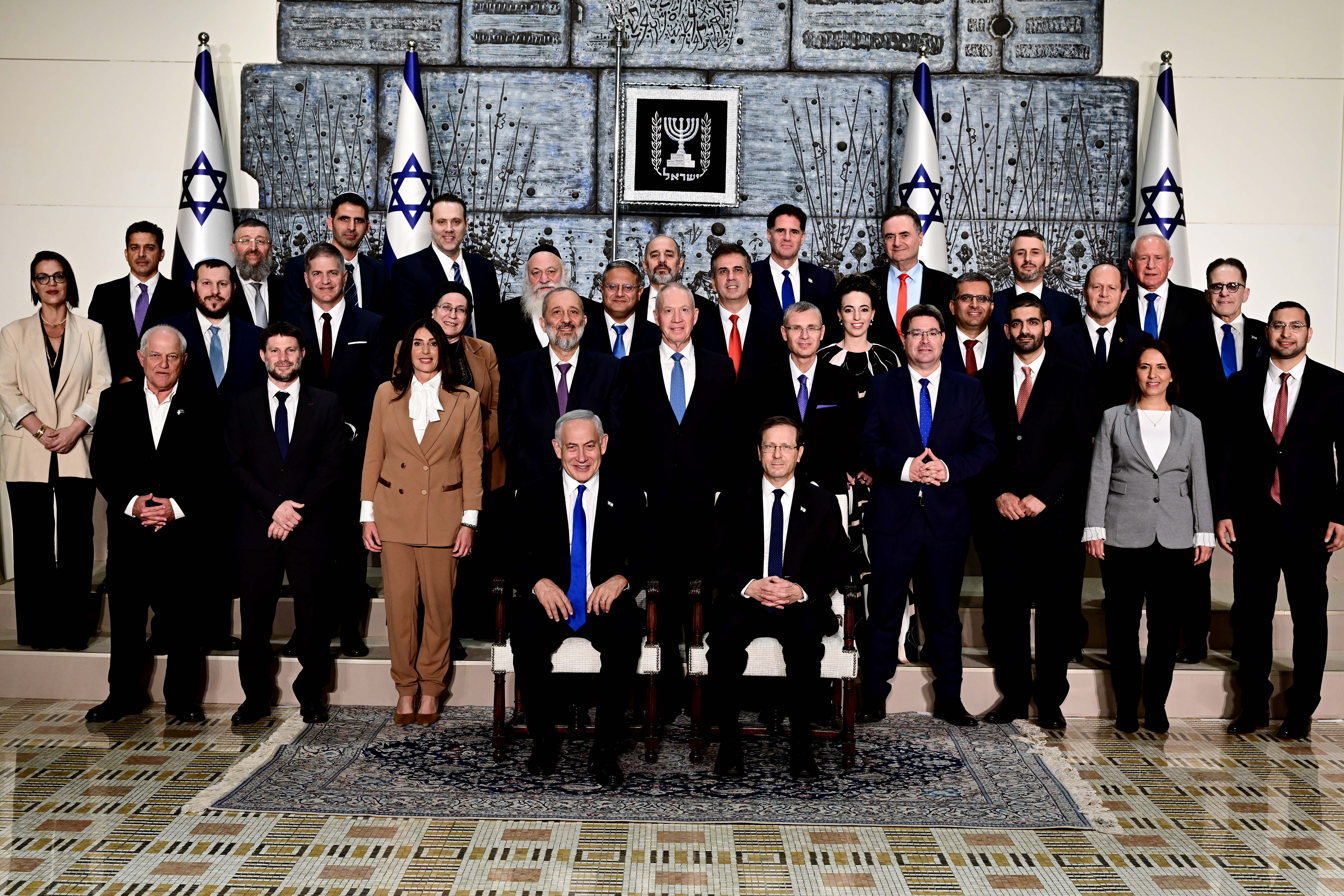
29 December: The 37th government of Israel takes office.

  - In a coordinated double terror attack, remotely detonated bombs explode at two bus stops in Jerusalem, resulting in 23 injuries and the deaths of a 16-year-old Israeli-Canadian student studying at a Jewish religious school and an Ethiopian-Israeli man.
  - A 17-year old Israeli Druze student, Tiran Fero dies following a car accident and his body is held hostage by a faction of the Palestinian Islamic Jihad until pressure by Israel, the Druze community and other countries results in his return.
  - Two Palestinian youths are killed and three others injured during a raid by Israeli soldiers at the Nablus refugee camp.
- 29 November - Four Palestinians, one in Hebron, one in al-Mughayir and two brothers in Kafr Ein, are killed during clashes with Israeli forces. Eight others are injured. A man is also killed in Kokhav Ya'akov after ramming and seriously injuring a female soldier.

=== December ===
- 1 December – Two Al-Quds Brigades leaders are killed and another person is injured by Israeli soldiers during a raid at the Jenin refugee camp, West Bank.
- 4 December – Iran announces that it has carried out four executions on the conviction of spying for Israel.
- 8 December – Three Palestinian Islamic Jihad gunmen are killed, and two others are injured during an arrest raid by Israeli soldiers at a refugee camp in Jenin, in the occupied West Bank.
- 9 December – David Tiacho wins the men's race in the Tiberias Marathon with a personal best time of 2:13:00 and Beatie Deutsch wins the women's race for the fourth time in 2:41:20.
- 18 December – Israel deports French-Palestinian lawyer and activist Salah Hamouri saying that Hamouri continues to be active with the Popular Front for the Liberation of Palestine, which has been designated as a terrorist organization by Israel, the United States, European Union and other countries.
- 29 December – The thirty-seventh government of Israel is sworn in at the Knesset, with Benjamin Netanyahu becoming Prime Minister again as the head of a far-right coalition.
- 30 December –
  - Israeli Immigration and Customs announces that it will require travelers from China to present a negative COVID-19 test in order to enter the country.
  - The Central Bureau of Statistics releases data showing that 9.656 million people live in Israel at the end of 2022, of whom 7.106 million (74%) are Jewish, 2.037 million (21%) are Arab and 513,000 (5%) are other groups; 2,675,000 foreign tourists visited and 70,000 people from 95 different countries immigrated to Israel in 2022.

== Deaths ==
- 1 January – Chanan Rapaport (b. 1928), clinical psychologist, professor of Psychology, director of the Henrietta Szold Institute, social issues advisor to Prime Ministers Golda Meir and Yitzhak Rabin.
- 2 January – Yitzhak Kaul (b. 1945), Deputy Director General of the Ministry of Communications (1976–1986), businessman, CEO of Israel Postal Authority (1986–1990), Bezeq (1990–1997), and Clal investment company (1997–2000).
- 2 January – Suzanne Singer (b. 1935), contributor and editor of Moment magazine and the Biblical Archaeology Review, director of the Alex Singer Project.
- 3 January – Mordechai Ben-Porat (b. 1923), organizer of Operation Ezra and Nehemiah rescue of Iraqi Jews, Member of Knesset 1965–1977 and 1981–1984, Minister without Portfolio 1982–1984, and recipient of the Israel Prize in 2001.
- 6 January – Yoram Taharlev (b. 1938), songwriter, poet and author.
- 10 January – Aura Herzog (b. 1924), First Lady of Israel (1983–1993) during the presidency of her husband Chaim Herzog, mother of the current president, Isaac Herzog, social and environmental activist, and founder of the Council for a Beautiful Israel.
- 12 January – Meier Schwarz (b. 1926), plant physiologist, lecturer and academic, head of the Hydroponics department at the Jacob Blaustein Institute for Desert Research in Beer Sheva.
- 16 January – Tova Berlinski (b. 1915), artist, notably of the Holocaust and her hometown Oświęcim, Poland, recipient of the Jerusalem Prize (1963) and the Mordechai Ish-Shalom Award (2000).
- 18 January – Eliezer Schweid (b. 1929), philosopher, scholar, writer and professor of Jewish philosophy at the Hebrew University of Jerusalem, fellow of the Jerusalem Center for Public Affairs and Israel Prize recipient (1994).
- 19 January – Yevgeny Aryeh (b. 1947), playwright, theater director, and founder of the Gesher Theater in Jaffa, Tel Aviv.
- 21 January – Haim Shahal (b. 1922), naval engineer, member of the Palmach and the Israel Defense Forces, recipient of the Israel Prize (1973).
- 24 January – Miriam Naor (b. 1947), District and Supreme Court judge, Chief Justice of the Supreme Court (2015 – 2017).
- 25 January – Mark Tseitlin (b. 1943), chess International Master (1978) and Grandmaster (1997).
- 26 January – David Bannett (b. 1921), electronics engineer, radar technologies pioneer, inventor of the Shabbat elevator, lecturer in electronics at Bar Ilan University and the Jerusalem College of Technology.
- 31 January – Esther Pollard (b. 1953), wife of former spy Jonathan Pollard.
- 10 February – Daniel Sasson (b. 1994), power forward player in the Israeli Basketball Premier League 2018–2021.
- 13 February – Emanuel Marx (b. 1927), social anthropologist, Professor Emeritus in the Department of Sociology and Anthropology at Tel Aviv University and recipient of the Israel Prize (1998).
- 13 February – Julia Wiener (b. 1935), writer, poet and translator into Russian.
- 15 February – Nachman Wolf (b. 1951), world champion discus thrower, shot put and javelin medalist for Israel at the Paralympics (1984 and 1988).
- 18 February – Gabriel Bach (b. 1927), State Attorney, one of the prosecutors in the Eichmann trial, jurist, Supreme Court Justice (1982–1997).
- 21 February – Nava Arad (b. 1938), Alignment and Labor Party politician, Member of Knesset (1981–1992, 1995–1996).
- 23 February – Yoel Marcus (b. 1932), journalist and political commentator, Sokolov Prize recipient (2017).
- 1 March – Amnon Shamosh (1929), non-fiction author and poet, recipient of the President's Prize for Literature in 2001.
- 2 March – Yosef Carmon (b. 1933), film actor, and actor and director at the Cameri Theater for over 50 years.
- 3 March – Yona Fischer (b. 1932), Israeli art curator and critic, recipient of the Israel Prize for design (1977).
- 7 March – Avraham Hirschson (b. 1941), Likud and Kadima Member of Knesset, Minister of Tourism, Communications and Finance; director general of the Treasury, convicted of embezzlement (2009).
- 12 March – Eliezer Goldberg (b. 1931), jurist, Supreme Court Justice (1983–1998) and state comptroller (1998–2005).
- 12 March – Henry Herscovici (b. 1927), sports shooter at the 1968 and 1972 Summer Olympics, the Asian Games (1966, 1970, and 1974) and the Maccabiah Games (1965, 1969).
- 17 March – David Schmeidler (b. 1939), mathematician and economic theorist in the field of Game Theory and Decision Theory, Professor Emeritus at Tel Aviv University and the Ohio State University.
- 18 March – Chaim Kanievsky (b. 1928), Haredi rabbi, a major halachic authority and author of books on Jewish religious law.
- 4 April – Eitan Wertheimer (b. 1951), industrialist and businessman.
- 8 April – Barak Lufan (b. 1987), kayaker and the head of the Israel Canoe Association.
- 1 May – Naftali Blumenthal (b. 1922), politician, MK for the Labor Alignment (1981–1984), comptroller of the Histadrut.
- 1 May – Ilan Gilon (b. 1956), politician, MK for the Meretz party (1999–2003 and 2009–2021).
- 13 May – Uri Savir (b. 1953), politician, MK (1999–2001) and diplomat.
- 19 May – Yaakov Sharett (b. 1927), author, reporter and diplomat.
- 27 May – Michael Sela (b. 1924), professor of Immunology, sixth president of the Weizmann Institute of Science and recipient of the Israel Prize for Life Science (1959).
- 27 May – Shulamit Goldstein (b. 1968), rhythmic gymnast at the 1988 Olympics, and 1985 and 1987 World Championships.
- 2 June – Uri Zohar (b. 1935), entertainer, actor and film director (Hole in the Moon, Three Days and a Child, Bloomfield), and rabbi.
- 9 June – Dan Goldstein (b.1954), software entrepreneur and businessman, founder of Formula Systems.
- 14 June – A. B. Yehoshua (b. 1936), novelist (The Lover, A Late Divorce), essayist and playwright, recipient of the Israel Prize for Hebrew literature (1995) and multiple literary awards.
- 29 June – Yehuda Meshi Zahav (b. 1955), social activist, founder of ZAKA.
- 29 June – David Weiss Halivni (b. 1927), rabbi, Talmudic scholar and teacher, recipient of the Israel Prize for scholarship (2008) and other awards.
- 18 July – Maya Attoun (b. 1974), award-winning multi-disciplinary visual artist, teacher at Bezalel Academy of Arts and Design and Shenkar College of Engineering, Design and Art.
- 24 July – Tamar Eshel (b. 1920), diplomat, deputy mayor of Jerusalem, MK for the Alignment (1977–1984).
- 26 July – Uri Orlev (b. 1931), Holocaust survivor, children's author and translator, recipient of the Hans Christian Andersen Award (1996).
- 29 July – Yitzchok Tuvia Weiss (b. 1926), ultra-Orthodox rabbi, head of the Edah HaChareidis in Jerusalem.
- 12 August – Aharon Yadlin (b. 1926), educator and politician, member of the Knesset for Mapai, the Alignment and the Labor Party (1960–1979), Deputy Minister of Education (1964–1972) and Minister of Education (1974–1977).
- 14 August – Svika Pick (b. 1949), pop singer, songwriter, composer and television personality.
- 22 August – Shalom Cohen (b.1930), ultra-Orthodox Sephardi rabbi, rosh yeshiva of the Old City branch of Porat Yosef Yeshiva, spiritual leader of the Shas political party and president of Moetzet Chachmei HaTorah.
- 8 September – Yoel Schwartz (b.1939), Haredi rabbi, scholar, author and senior lecturer at Dvar Yerushalayim yeshiva.
- 18 September – Elyakim Haetzni (b.1926), lawyer, settlement activist, politician and member of the Knesset for Tehiya (1990–1992).
- 7 October – Shoshana Netanyahu (b. 1923), lawyer, jurist and Supreme Court justice.
- 10 October – Leon Schidlowsky (b. 1931), composer for orchestra, chamber ensemble, choir, and various musical instruments, proponent of graphic notation.
- 19 October – Dina Merhav (b. 1936), sculptor, noted for soaring sculptures of birds and angels made from scrap iron.
- 28 October – Hannah Pick-Goslar (b. 1928), nurse, Holocaust survivor and childhood friend and fellow prisoner in Bergen-Belsen of Anne Frank.
- 29 October – Hava Pinhas-Cohen (b. 1955) award-winning writer and poet, founder and editor of the Dimui literary journal.
- 1 November – Moshe Ha-Elion (b. 1925), Holocaust survivor, Ladino author and translator.
- 3 November – Uzzi Ornan (b. 1923), social activist and linguist, member of the Academy of the Hebrew Language, professor of natural languages computing at the Technion and professor emeritus at the Hebrew University of Jerusalem.
- 6 November – Chaim Walkin (b. 1945), Orthodox rabbi, teacher and dean of the Ateres Israel rabbinical academy and yeshiva.
- 21 November – Nuzhat Katzav (b. 1932), author and politician, member of Knesset for the Alignment (1974–1977).
- 8 December – Yitzhak Klepter (b. 1950), rock musician and songwriter, vocalist and electric guitarist of the Kaveret rock band.
- 11 December – Moshe Mizrahi (b. 1950), Head of Israel Police Investigations Division (2001–2005) and Police and Community Branch-Civil Guard (2005–2006), member of Knesset for the Labor Party (2013–2015) and Zionist Union (2018–2019).
- 15 December – Eliyahu Offer (b. 1944), football player for Hapoel Be'er Sheva (1959–1978), manager (Beitar Jerusalem, Maccabi Sha'arayim), and restaurateur.
- 22 December Ze'ev Iviansky (b. 1922) political scientist, author, academic and lecturer at the Hebrew University of Jerusalem.
- 23 December – Willie Sims (b. 1958), basketball player (Hapoel Tel Aviv, Elitzur Netanya, Maccabi Tel Aviv).
- 25 December – Haim Drukman (b. 1932), Orthodox rabbi and politician, member of Knesset (1977–1983, 1999–2003), a spiritual leader of the Religious Zionist community, Rosh Yeshiva of Yeshivat Or Etzion, and head of the Center for Bnei Akiva Yeshivot.
- 30 December – Shmuel Toledano (b. 1921), Mossad intelligence officer and politician, member of the Knesset for the Democratic Movement for Change and Shinui (1977–1981).

== See also ==
- COVID-19 pandemic in Israel
- Israel at the 2022 Winter Olympics
- Timeline of the Israeli–Palestinian conflict in 2022
