= 2022 El'ad stabbing =

2022 terrorist attack on civilians in El'ad, Israel

- Part of the Israeli–Palestinian conflict
- The attack site
- Native name: הפיגוע באלעד
- Location: 32°03′08″N 34°57′24″E; El'ad, Israel
- Date: 5 May 2022; 4 years ago 20:35 pm
- Attack type: Mass stabbing
- Weapon: Axe
- Deaths: 4 civilians
- Injuries: 3 civilians
- No. of participants: 2

On 5 May 2022, a terror attack took place in El'ad, Central District, Israel, during Israel's Independence Day (Yom Ha'atzmaut). Four civilians were murdered and several others were injured.

Israeli Police identified the perpetrators as two Palestinians from Rummanah, West Bank. They were captured on 8 May.

== Background ==
In the weeks preceding the stabbing, Palestinians and Israeli Arabs had perpetrated a string of deadly attacks in Israel, making it the deadliest period since 2006. A week before the attack, two Hamas supporters from Nablus murdered a security guard in Ariel. While the search for the murderers was still going on by the Israeli Police, Yahya Sinwar, the leader of Hamas in Gaza, made a public speech where he encouraged the Palestinian and Israeli Arabs to "raise every possible weapon, will it be a rifle, a pistol, or a knife" against Israelis.

== Attack ==
The attackers arrived at Shlomo Ibn Gbirol street at 20:35 local time, holding axes and a pistol. They encountered a security guard, who tried to stop them but was killed by the attackers. They then arrived at the nearby central park in El'ad, which was full of visitors who came to celebrate the 74th Independence Day of Israel, and began to attack them, killing two more men and wounding four more.

Two of the killed victims were in their 40s, while the third victim was a 35-year-old man. A fourth victim, a 75-year-old man, succumbed to his wounds in February 2023, eight months after the attack. A 60-year-old man and a 35-year-old man suffered serious injuries. Fighting the attackers, a 40-year-old man was moderately injured and a 23-year-old man lightly injured.

== Assailants ==
The two assailants were identified by the Israeli Police as As'ad Alrafa'ani (20) and Sabhi Shajir (19) from Rummanah, near Jenin in the West Bank. Both escaped in a vehicle after the attack. After two days of searching, they were caught hiding in a nearby forest, between Elad and Rosh HaAyin, by two Shin Bet agents and an officer from Maglan commando unit.

== Reactions ==
The President of the State of Palestine, Mahmoud Abbas, said that "The killing of Palestinians and Israelis only leads to a further deterioration in the situation at a time when we are all begging to achieve stability and prevent escalation".

United States Secretary of State Antony Blinken said during a press briefing that the US "vehemently condemns" the "horrific attack targeting innocent men and women".

Hamas praised the attack, implying that it was in retaliation for recent clashes at the Al-Aqsa Mosque compound, while not claiming responsibility. Palestinian Islamic Jihad also praised the attack.

Some Palestinians in Nablus, Tulkarm, Gaza City and Khan Yunis celebrated the attack, handing out candies to passers-by. A video encouraging the murder of Jews with an axe circulated on a Palestinian Telegram channel.

In Yemen, the Houthis celebrated the attack.

World leaders - including the President of France, Emmanuel Macron, the Minister of Foreign Affairs of the United Arab Emirates, Sheikh Abdullah bin Zayed Al Nahyan and the Secretary of State of the United States, Antony Blinken - condemned the attack and expressed their condolences.

== See also ==
- 2022 Beersheba attack
- 2022 Bnei Brak shooting
- 2022 Tel Aviv shooting
- 2022 Hadera shooting
- Timeline of the Israeli–Palestinian conflict in 2022
