= Haim Shahal =

Israeli naval engineer (1922–2022)

- חיים שחל
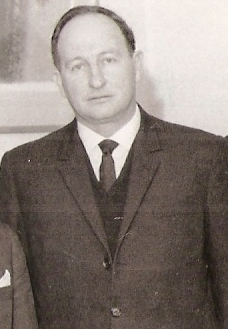
- Shahal in 1967
- Born: Haim Liebel; 21 December 1922; Tel Aviv, Mandatory Palestine
- Died: 21 January 2022 (aged 99)
- Occupation: Naval engineer

Haim Shahal (Hebrew: חיים שחל; 21 December 1922 – 21 January 2022) was an Israeli naval engineer.

== Life and career ==
Shahal was born as Haim Liebel in Tel Aviv, the son of Shlomo Liebel. During his education, he was trained as an electrical engineer. In 1946, he served in the Palmach elite fighting force, commanding and planning on the Haganah venture Night of the Bridges. He also served in the Israel Defense Forces, discharging in 1970, retiring at the rank of lieutenant colonel. He was initially drafted to work with the naval squadrons in Jaffa, and served as an engineering officer in the Israeli Navy. In his final capacity, he headed the Navy's development unit.

In 1970, Shahal became chief engineer for the Israel Shipyards. He was awarded the Israel Defense Prize by the Israeli president in 1973. He was also honored for an award, alongside Royal Danish Air Force commissioned officer major Viggo Dan Nielsen. With his naval contributions, he created missile ships.

== Death ==
Shahal died on 21 January 2022, at the age of 99.
