= Fadi al-Hadami =

Palestinian politician

- فادي الهدمي
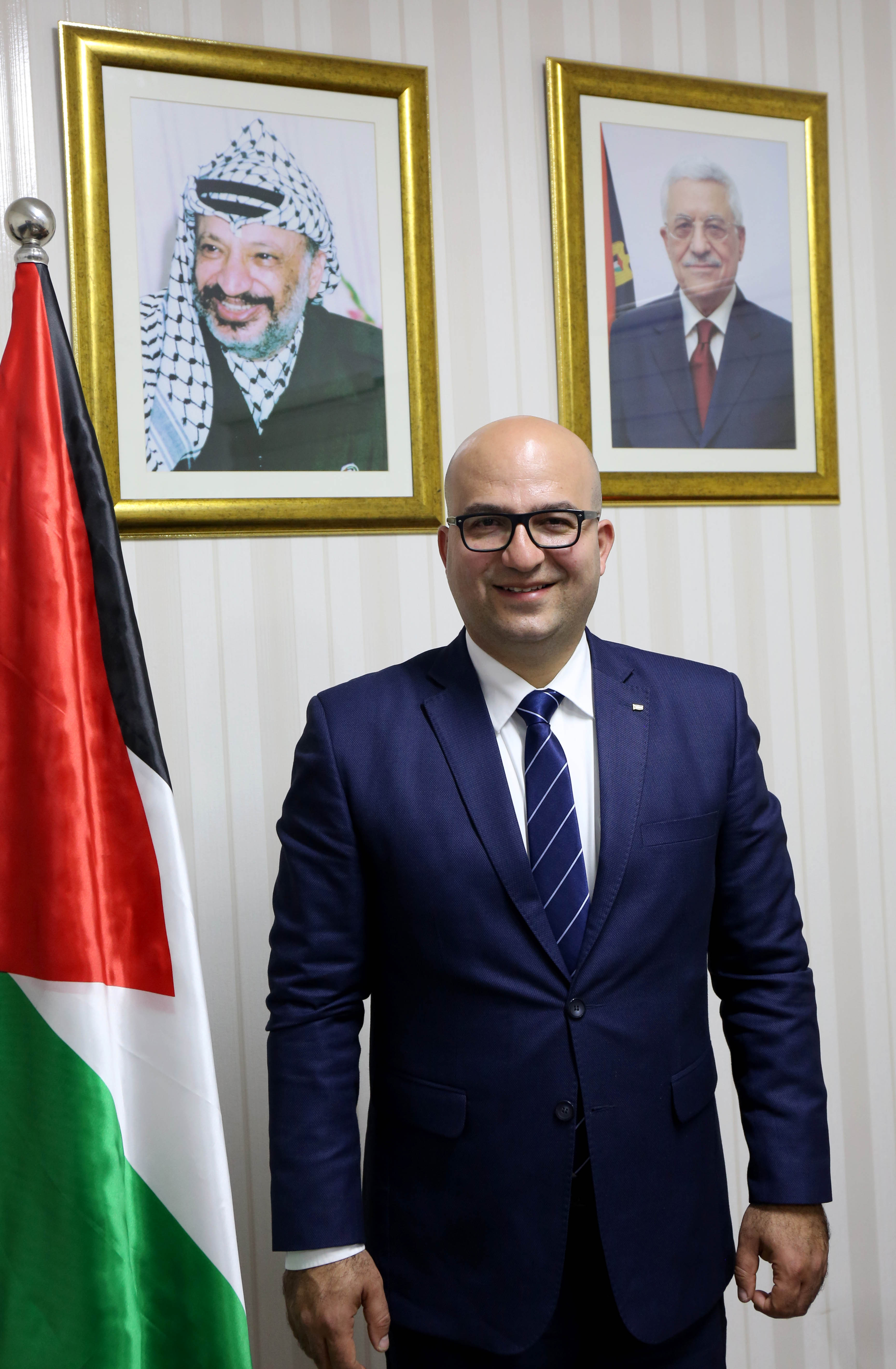

Minister of Jerusalem Affairs
- Incumbent
- Assumed office 13 April 2019
- Prime Minister: Mohammad Shtayyeh

Personal details
- Born: 4 November 1976 (age 50) Jerusalem
- Education: American University in Cairo (BBA); University of Manchester

Fadi Arafat Salim Al-Hadmi (Arabic: فادي الهدمي; born 4 November 1976) is a Palestinian politician who served as Minister of Jerusalem Affairs in Prime Minister Mohammad Shtayyeh's government. He worked on programs supported by funding from the United States Agency for International Development and as a program officer for non-governmental organizations.

== Early life and education ==
Fadi Arafat Salim Al-Hadmi was born in Jerusalem on 4 November 1976, to Arafat Al-Hadmi. He graduated from the American University in Cairo with a Bachelor of Business Administration degree and the University of Manchester with a Master's degree in economics. He worked for programs supported by funding from the United States Agency for International Development and as a program officer for non-governmental organizations and the World Bank Group. He owns the Palestinian Trading and Investment Company.

== Career ==
Al-Hadami served as director of the Jerusalem Chamber of Commerce and Investment. Prime Minister Mohammad Shtayyeh appointed al-Hadami as Minister of Jerusalem Affairs in his government in 2019.

As of 2020, al-Hadami has been arrested by Israeli authorities four times. Al-Hadami was arrested while walking with Chilean President Sebastián Piñera to the Temple Mount in July 2019. Al-Hadami and Governor Adnan Ghaith were arrested on 25 September for engaging in political activities for the Palestinian Authority (PA) in East Jerusalem. He was arrested on 3 April 2020 for violating the prohibition on PA political activities and police confiscated NIS 10,000.

== Works cited ==
=== Journals ===
- "Chronology: August 16 – November 15, 2019". Arab Studies Quarterly. 74 (1). The Middle East Journal: 95–133. 2019. doi:10.2307/26933141. JSTOR 26933141.

=== News ===
- "Israel arrests Palestinian minister for Jerusalem affairs for fourth time". The Times of Israel. 3 April 2020. Archived from the original on 4 November 2026.
- Gadzo, Mersiha (25 September 2019). "Israel arrests Palestine's Jerusalem Minister Fadi al-Hadami". Al Jazeera English. Archived from the original on 4 November 2026.
- Younes, Youssef (22 April 2019). فادي الهدمي [The eighteenth Palestinian government, April 2019]. Al Jazeera English (in Arabic). Archived from the original on 4 November 2026.

=== Web ===
- "Fadi al-Hidmi". European Council on Foreign Relations. Archived from the original on 29 February 2024.
- السيد فادي عرفات سليم الهدمي [Mr. Fadi Arafat Salim Al-Hadmi] (in Arabic). Government of Palestine. Archived from the original on 9 September 2020.
- فادي الهدمي [Fadi Al-Hadmi] (in Arabic). Palestine Economic Policy Research Institute. Archived from the original on 4 November 2026.
