= Suzanne Singer =

Diné mechanical engineer

Suzanne Singer is a Diné mechanical engineer and advocate for clean energy solutions in Native American communities. She did her graduate work in microscale heat transfer and thermoelectric devices at UC Berkeley. She has also worked for Sandia National Laboratories and Lawrence Livermore National Laboratory. Currently, she uses this technical expertise to bring much-needed infrastructure and more sustainable development to tribal lands where many communities lack basic access to resources. Singer is recognized for her nonprofit initiative, Native Renewables, which addresses energy access challenges for Navajo families who do not have access to electricity. Her other program, which includes the off-grid solar photovoltaic (PV) workforce, provides essential skills for maintaining solar energy systems.

== Early life and education ==
Suzanne Singer grew up in Flagstaff, Arizona, just off the Navajo reservation, where her parents had been raised in a rural setting without electricity, running water, or indoor plumbing. STEM education helped them pull themselves out of poverty into careers, and their example of hard work and perseverance inspired Singer from an early age. She developed an early interest in math, influenced by her mother, who used programming to map the moon and planets, and her father, an engineer who was hands-on with electronics. This led her to pursue a degree in mechanical engineering at the University of Arizona, where she studied heat transfer. Later on, she joined UC Berkeley for her graduate studies, where she earned both a master's and a Ph.D. in mechanical engineering on microscale heat transfer in nanostructured materials to improve thermoelectric device efficiency for power generation and refrigeration.

== Career ==
Suzanne Singer has a background in mechanical engineering, which enables her to create programs that support tribal energy independence, offer affordable solar energy solutions, and provide training to strengthen families. She worked as a staff engineer and post-doc at Lawrence Livermore National Laboratory’s Tribal Energy Program. Singer used her expertise in renewable energy to build efficient energy infrastructure for tribes across the country. Since joining Lawrence Livermore National Laboratory (LLNL) in 2011, she has worked on projects focused on solar power and energy efficiency. She also serves as a technical advisor to the Tribal Clean Energy Resource Center, a partnership between LLNL and Northern Arizona University, to address tribal energy challenges.

Singer is a co-founder and executive director of Native Renewables Inc. She co-founded Native Renewables with Wahleah Johns, a fellow Navajo in 2016, to address electricity access challenges for Native families living off-grid. After meeting at a dinner and staying in touch, they were inspired to create sustainable solutions for the 15,000 Navajo homes without electricity. Native Renewables focuses on three main programs: affordable financing for solar installations, education to help families maintain systems for 20+ years, and support for repairing non-functional systems.

Additionally, Singer launched a 7-8 week off-grid solar PV training program to build a Native workforce that provides electricity and support to their communities.

She is a member of the Navajo (Diné) tribe, and has received notable honors, including the 2019 U.S. Clean Energy Education Empowerment (C3E) Entrepreneurship Award and the 2021 Echoing Green. Another special recognition included her being recognized at the 8th Annual C3E Women in Clean Energy Symposium, with a financial award to support her word in Native Renewables.

Singer was included on Lydia Jennings' list of inspirational indigenous scientists created for the nonprofit, AISES.
