= 2022 Al-Aqsa clashes =

Part of the Israeli–Palestinian conflict

Coordinates: 31.77617°N 35.23583°E

- Part of the Israeli–Palestinian conflict
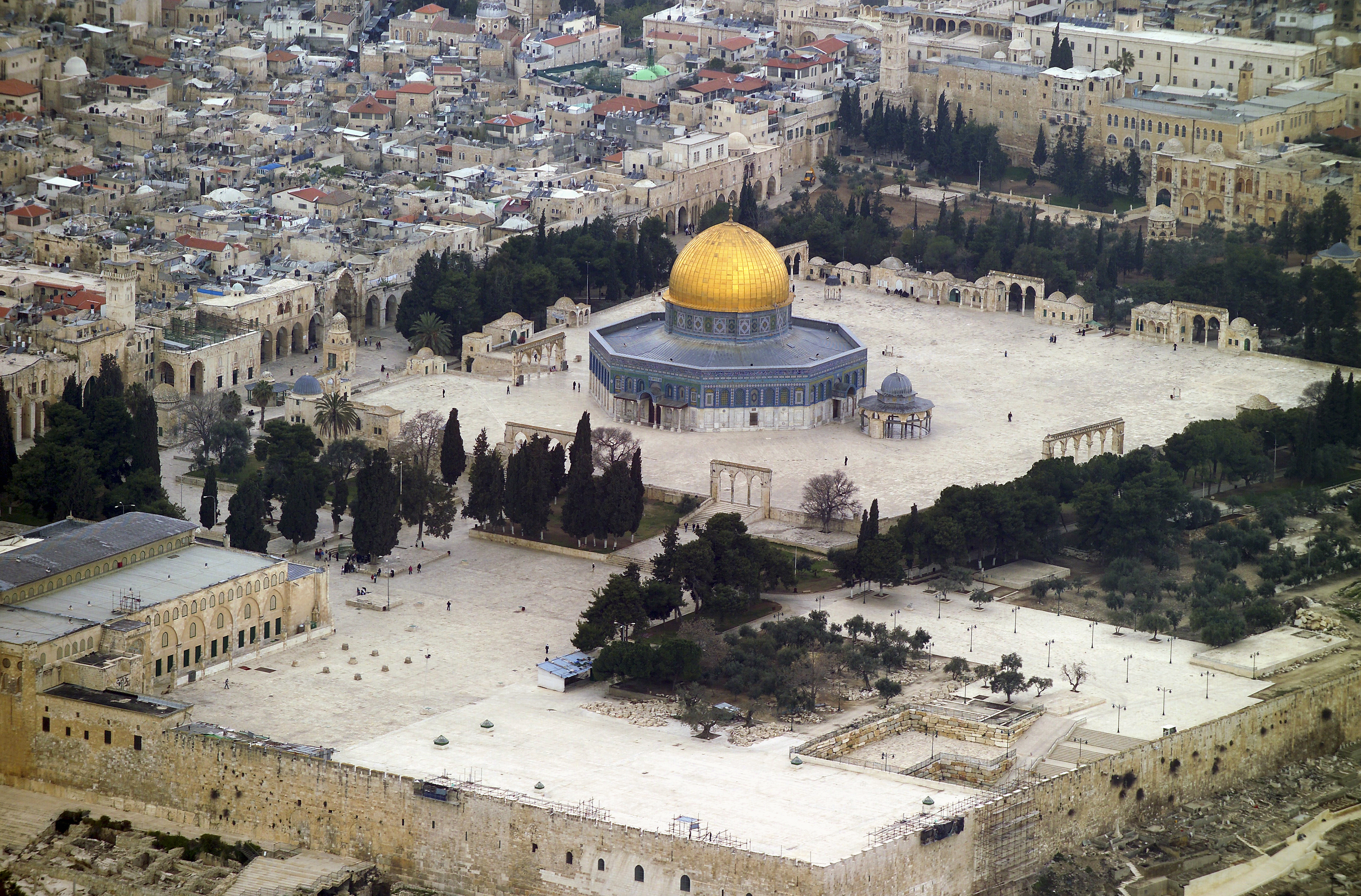
- The Al-Aqsa compound, also known as the Temple Mount, where the clashes occurred
- Date: 15 April 2022 (4 years ago)
- Location: Al-Aqsa Mosque compound, Jerusalem
- Caused by: Palestinian concerns over the status quo at Al-Aqsa; Palestinians throwing stones at Israeli police

Parties
Israel Police	Palestinians in the Al-Aqsa Mosque compound

Casualties and losses
3 police officers injured	1 Palestinian civilian killed by rubber bullet, 200+ injured; 400 arrested

On 15 April 2022, clashes erupted between Palestinians and Israeli Security Forces on the Al-Aqsa compound in the Old City of Jerusalem. According to the United Nations Special Coordinator for the Middle East Peace Process, the clashes began when Palestinians threw stones, firecrackers, and other heavy objects at Israeli police officers. The policemen used tear gas shells, stun grenades and police batons against the Palestinians. Some Palestinians afterwards barricaded themselves inside the Al-Aqsa Mosque and proceeded to throw stones at the officers. In response, police raided the mosque, arresting those who had barricaded themselves inside. In addition, some damage was done to the mosque's structure.

Over the course of the clashes, around 160 Palestinians were injured, including a Waqf guard shot in the eye with a rubber bullet, 4 women, 27 children, and one journalist. Approximately 400 people were arrested; the majority of them were released later that day. Three Israeli police officers were also wounded. Concerns were raised about possible excessive use of force by Israeli forces.

The break-in into the mosque caused a stir among the Palestinian public, and many reactions among the international community. The clashes were reported in the Arabic-speaking media as a storming of the Al-Aqsa Mosque, while Israeli authorities and media often use the term riots to refer to these events.

Additional skirmishes, though more restricted, occurred in the days that followed at the Holy Sites and in and around the Old City.

== Background ==
On 14 April, Al-Jazeera reported an increased likelihood of another Israeli-Palestinian confrontation due to increasing tensions in Israel and the Palestinian Territories. In March and April 2022, Palestinians and Israeli Arabs carried out a series of violent attacks that led to the death of 17 Israelis, making it the deadliest period since 2006. A United Nations agency estimated Israeli forces have killed at least 40 Palestinians since February, when tensions started to rise.

The Temple Mount in Jerusalem is one of the most contested religious sites in the world. It is considered the holiest site in Judaism, as it was the location of two Jewish temples in antiquity. For Muslims, the Mount is the site of the third sacred mosque in Islam, the Al-Aqsa Mosque. While the site has been controlled by Israel since 1967, it is administered by the Jerusalem Islamic Waqf under the custodianship of Jordan. Some Palestinians believe that Israel is trying to change the status quo in various ways, for example, by allowing Jews to pray in the Temple Mount. For them, Israel has broken a decades-old understanding that allowed Jews to visit but not worship there.

Shortly before the incident, a Jewish extremist religious group called Returning to the Mount announced that it intended to perform Passover sacrifices on the Temple Mount during the Jewish holiday of Passover. On 14 April six members were arrested planning to sacrifice a goat on the Temple Mount. Rumours had been circulating on social media that Jewish hard-liners were planning to enter the Al-Aqsa Mosque on the weekend.

During the Muslim holy month of Ramadan the year before, nighttime demonstrations about evictions in Jerusalem and raids at the Al-Aqsa compound led, four days later, to an 11-day confrontation between Israel and Gaza.

== Events ==
According to the Israeli police, Palestinian protesters began marching at around 4:00 AM with Palestinian and Hamas flags in the location around the mosque. Police statements indicate that the protests turned violent as demonstrators threw rocks at the Western Wall and lit firecrackers, which police responded to by using tear gas and stun grenades against the crowd. The protesters are then said to have attacked police officers with stones, injuring three. The fighting was reported to have occurred near the Lions' Gate.

Al Jazeera reported that "a number of occupation soldiers climbed on the roofs of buildings surrounding Al-Aqsa Mosque. They evacuated the courtyard of Al-Aqsa Mosque and closed most of the doors leading to it". According to Ynet and Reuters news, "Police says forces entered the compound after the Ramadan morning prayer to break up a violent crowd that started rioting at the holy site and threw stones toward the nearby Jewish prayer space of the Western Wall; Police adds 3 officers lightly injured, as were 59 rioters."

Some of the Palestinians barricaded themselves inside the Al-Aqsa Mosque. Police said that Palestinians had been stockpiling stones and throwing them from the mosque. The New York Times stated that the confrontation started at about 5:30 a.m. Palestinians said that the Israeli officers entered the building just after the Muezzin announced the Adhan, while police said that they had waited until after the prayers ended. Policemen evacuated worshippers from the mosque with police batons as stun grenades and firecrackers used in the clashes caused a massive plume of smoke to go off. Israeli police temporarily blocked the Damascus Gate and restricted other entrances to exclude young men while permitting women, older men and children. The police left six hours later and the mosque's routine went on without any incidents.

The Palestine Red Crescent Society said 158 Palestinians had been injured, primarily by rubber bullets, stun grenades, and police batons. Roughly 470 people were detained by Israeli forces. On April 16, it was reported that 130 people were still imprisoned. Sixty-five minors were released with restraining orders, and 200 detainees were let free after questioning by law enforcement.

== Aftermath ==
On Friday evening, hundreds of Arab Israelis in Umm al-Fahm organized demonstrations to protest the Israeli incursion, some of which escalated into riots. The same day, a Palestinian teenager stabbed and wounded a man in Haifa. The girl later admitted that she had done it in response to the storming of the mosque. Channel 12 reported on April 16 that Egyptian authorities had convinced the Palestinian militant group Hamas not to fire rockets in response.

On April 17, further violence began when the police confined Muslims already inside the compound and denied access to Muslims who were still outside the site. Jews were given an armed police escort around the compound. Palestinians threw stones on three buses headed to the Western Wall. Seven passengers were injured. Jewish worshippers wearing prayer shawls were attacked in the Old City. Police officers entered the Temple Mount again, saying that Palestinian crowds were trying to prevent non-Muslims from entering the Mount. Nine people were arrested and Palestinian medics said that 17 people were wounded. A stabbing attempt in the Israeli settlement of Beit El was foiled by security forces. Ra'am announced it would temporarily halt its coalition membership in the Government of Israel in protest against the situation at al-Aqsa.

On April 15, UN Secretary General António Guterres said in a statement that provocations on the Holy Esplanade needed to cease and for the status quo to be upheld and respected. According to the U.S State department, US Secretary of State Antony Blinken and Jordanian Foreign Minister Ayman Safadi discussed the situation on 18 April and “Secretary Blinken emphasized the importance of upholding the historic status quo at the Haram Al-Sharif/Temple Mount, and appreciation for the Hashemite Kingdom of Jordan’s special role as custodian of Muslim holy places in Jerusalem,” Jordan’s King Abdullah, speaking with UN Secretary-General Antonio Guterres, said that “provocative acts” by Israel violated “the legal and historic status quo” of the Muslim holy shrines.

On April 22, Israeli police in full riot gear stormed the mosque after Palestinian stone throwing at a gate where they were stationed. According to police, rioters had hurled stones and launched firecrackers at officers at early morning and had also barricaded themselves in the mosque. Israeli police used a drone to fire tear gas into groups of Palestinians. On 29 April, the last Friday of Ramadan, there were new clashes at the mosque following the prior weeks of violence in Israel and the West Bank. 42 Palestinians were wounded.

=== Status quo ===
On May 8, Israeli Prime Minister Naftali Bennett said that Israel will make its own decisions concerning Jerusalem and the Temple Mount after Ra’am party leader Mansour Abbas said "“Ra’am’s position in the coalition, as regards the blessed Al-Aqsa Mosque, will be based on the results of the joint Israeli-Jordanian-international meetings,”, It was announced on May 10 President Biden is to meet Jordan's King Abdullah on May 13. Maintenance of the status quo at the Al-Aqsa mosque will be one topic of discussion. Israeli and Jordanian officials are expected to discuss the situation in Jerusalem in the near future.

== Reactions ==
=== Palestinian Authority ===
Palestinian Authority Minister for Jerusalem Affairs Fadi al-Hadami strongly condemned the raid on Al-Aqsa Mosque by Israeli forces. He blamed Israel for the actions and called on the international community to intervene immediately to stop Israeli actions against Muslim holy sites.

Hussein al-Sheikh, a senior PLO official, warned against alleged Israeli attempts to divide the Temple Mount between Muslims and Jews.

=== International organizations ===
The United Nations Special Coordinator for the Middle East Peace Process, Tor Wennesland, expressed his deep concern over what is happening in the city of Jerusalem and the Al-Aqsa Mosque. He said "I am deeply concerned about the deteriorating conditions in the city of Jerusalem during these holy days." The UN official demanded that the provocations at Al-Haram Al-Sharif be stopped immediately.

=== Other countries ===
In a joint statement, Germany, France, Italy and Spain called for respecting the current status of the holy sites in Jerusalem and also respecting Jordan's role in these holy sites, and called "all parties to exercise the utmost restraint and to refrain from violence and all forms of provocation."

Saudi Arabia expressed its condemnation and denunciation of the Israel Defense Forces storming Al-Aqsa Mosque, closing its gates, and attacking unarmed worshippers inside the mosque and in its external squares. It also considered "this systematic escalation is a blatant attack on the sanctity of Al-Aqsa Mosque and a violation of international resolutions and covenants".

Kuwait expressed its strong condemnation and denunciation of the Israel Defense Forces' storming of Al-Aqsa Mosque and the attack on worshipers. It also considered "These attacks are a dangerous escalation and a flagrant violation of all international conventions and resolutions and a reason to fuel violence and undermine the stability of the region".

The spokesperson for the Ministry of Foreign Affairs of Egypt, Ambassador Ahmed Hafez, "condemned the Israeli forces’ storming of the blessed Al-Aqsa Mosque, and the violence that followed this incursion against Palestinians in the courtyards of Al-Aqsa Mosque", which resulted in the injury and arrest of dozens of worshipers. He stressed, "the necessity of self-restraint and providing full protection for Muslim worshipers and allowing them to perform Islamic rites in Al-Aqsa Mosque, which is a purely Islamic endowment for Muslims."

Iran strongly censured the Israel Defense Forces' storming of Al-Aqsa Mosque. Hossein Amir-Abdollahian, the current foreign minister of Iran, stated this incident a sign of the resistance of the heroic and brave the Palestinian people and the desperation of the Zionists, during a phone call with Ismail Haniyeh, Chief of Hamas's Political Bureau. Also, Saeed Khatibzadeh, Iranian Foreign Ministry Spokesman called the Israeli forces' operations violated international law and human rights.

The storming was also condemned by Bahrain, Morocco and the United Arab Emirates, which had normalized relations with Israel two years before. On 24 April, leaders from Jordan, Egypt and UAE met to discuss restoring calm in Jerusalem.

== See also ==
- Temple Mount entry restrictions
- Timeline of the Israeli–Palestinian conflict in 2022
