= Tova Berlinski =

Israeli painter (1915–2022)

Tova Berlinski טובה ברלינסקי
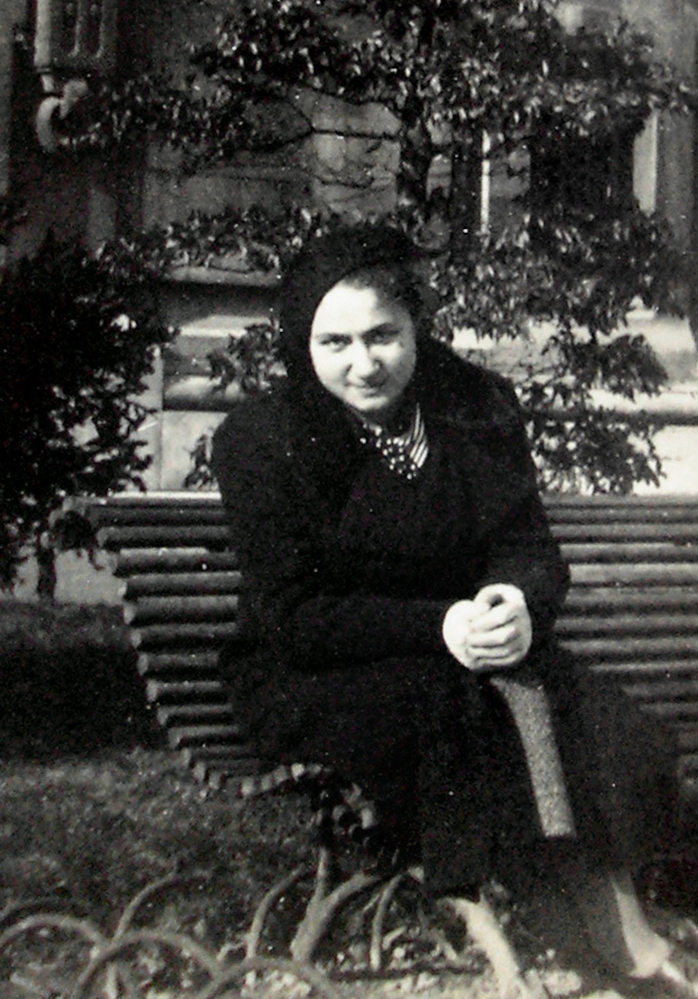
- Berlinski in Paris, 1934
- Born: 20 April 1915; Oświęcim, Galicia and Lodomeria, Austria-Hungary
- Died: 16 January 2022 (aged 106); Jerusalem, Israel
- Known for: Painting

Tova Berlinski (Hebrew: טובה ברלינסקי; 20 April 1915 – 16 January 2022) was a Polish-born Israeli painter who was considered to be a doyenne of the painting community in Jerusalem.

== Life and career ==
Berlinski was born in Oświęcim as Gusta Wolf, the daughter of a Hasidim, owner of a furniture store, Samuel Wolf, and Gizela née Horowitz. She was the eldest of six siblings.

She met her husband, Elijah, thanks to her activity in the Zionist youth movement. Ten days after their wedding in 1938, they left Poland, for the then Mandatory Palestine to join the pioneers working to establish Israel. They came as illegal immigrants, avoiding British authorities who were restricting Jewish immigration at the time. The artist kept in touch with her family in Poland as long as it was possible to send letters. During World War II, her family in Poland was murdered in Auschwitz-Birkenau.

Initially, she was passionate about theatre. She started painting at the age of 38. From 1953 to 1957, she studied at the Bezalel Academy of Arts in Jerusalem; later also in Paris under the care of Andre Lhote and Henri Goetz, where she remained within the circle of abstract expressionism. Until 1952 she lived in Tel Aviv. Then she lived and worked in Jerusalem. In 1963, she won the Jerusalem Prize, and in 2000, she received the Mordechai Ish-Shalom Award for Lifetime Achievement and a significant contribution to the development of art.

From 1965 to 1984, she was a lecturer at The Popular University – Beit Ha'Am Bezalel. She also conducted private lessons in her own studio. In 1974 she joined the Aklim group. From 1982 to 1984, she was a member of the Radius Group.

In 1984, for the first time since leaving Poland, the artist visited her hometown, Oświęcim. Later, she revisited the city many times, refusing to associate the town solely in the light of the history of the concentration camp that existed here and wanting to emphasize the importance of her memories of her happy childhood in this city.

Berlinski died in Jerusalem on 16 January 2022, at the age of 106 years.

== Work ==
Originally, Berlinski's paintings were full of light and colors. In the early period of her work, the artist was fascinated by colorful children's drawings, later she created colorful abstractions and landscapes. Over time, figurative motifs appeared in the artist's work.

Her paintings from the 1960s and 1970s show the influence of the past in Oświęcim, which the artist remembered as a beautiful city and as a memory of the idyllic landscape of her childhood. These paintings represent an abstract style with contrasting colors and black outlines. There are also blurred figures in the paintings from this period, which indicate family members who were murdered in the Holocaust.

However, it was not until the 1970s that the artist began to deal directly with the issue of the Holocaust. Her paintings became more and more abstract and larger areas of color appeared in them. In the 1970s, the colors became more moderate and monochrome, but the patches of color grew and spread over the entire surface of the painting. Berlinski often painted closed windows and the views visible through closed shutters.

Later Israeli landscapes with tall cypresses and rocks evoke the impression of austerity and emptiness. Empty chairs are presented in minimalist still lifes. In portraits, family members appear with blurred and fading features or faces that fade into geometric patterns – this is a reflection of the loss of the portrayed. Later, the main motif of Berlinski's paintings became dark, often black flowers, often dedicated to parents and siblings murdered in Auschwitz.

Berlinski exhibited her works in among other places Israel, Great Britain, the United States, and the Netherlands. In January 2006, for the first time in Poland, her works were presented in an exhibition titled "About love and death" at the Arsenał Municipal Gallery in Poznań. In the same year, they were also presented at the Auschwitz Jewish Center in Oświęcim and at the Center for Jewish Culture in Kraków.

In 2006, Berlinski donated one of her works to the Auschwitz-Birkenau Museum. This is an untitled image of a single gray flower in a glass vase. The composition, 100 x 70 cm, in gray and black tones, was made on paper in a mixed technique. A year later, the artist donated two paintings to the collection of the Auschwitz Jewish Center in Oświęcim.

=== Selected solo exhibitions ===
- 1967 – Chemerinsky Art Gallery, Tel Aviv
- 1975 – Pastel 1975, Debel Gallery, Jerusalem
- 1976 – Debel Gallery, Jerusalem
- 1991 – Pastel on Paper, Sara Levi Gallery, Tel Aviv
- 1992 – Oil Paintings, Jerusalem
- 1995 – Black Flowers, Israel Museum, Jerusalem
- 1995 – Herzeliya Museum of Art, Herzeliya
- 1999 – Artspace Gallery, Jerusalem
- 2002 – Drawings and Oil Paintings, Jerusalem
