= 2022 Beersheba attack =

2022 terrorist attack in Israel

- Part of Arab-Israeli conflict
- The attack site
- Location: 31°14′43″N 34°48′41″E; Beersheba, Israel
- Date: 22 March 2022; 4 years ago 16:10 – 16:18
- Attack type: Vehicle-ramming attack, mass stabbing
- Deaths: 4 civilians (+1 assailant)
- Injuries: 2 civilians
- Assailant: Mohammed Abu al-Kiyan
- Defender: Arthur Chaimov

On March 22, 2022, four people were killed and two more were injured during a stabbing and vehicle-ramming attack by an Islamic State supporter in Beersheba, Israel.

== Background ==
In early 2022, a string of clashes between Israeli security forces and Palestinians occurred, but mostly confined to the West Bank and Jerusalem, and not the Southern District in which Beersheba is located. The incident was the third such attack in a week.

Israeli and American authorities had expressed concern about the rise of attacks, which they noted could increase as the Muslim holiday of Ramadan would approach.

== Incident ==
The attack began at around 16:10 pm when Mohammed Abu al-Kiyan drove over to a gas station in Derech Hevron street where he stabbed and killed a female employee. He then drove his car over to the BIG shopping center where he ran over a Chabad rabbi on his bicycle, killing him.

Kiyan then went to another neighbouring shopping mall. After stabbing a woman to death in the clothing section, he ran towards a roundabout where he killed a 67-year-old man. He was then approached by bus driver Arthur Chaimov, who initially thought a car crash had occurred but on closer inspection realized Kiyan had a knife. Chaimov told Kiyan to put his knife down and surrender, which the attacker refused to do. Kiyan lunged forward and tried to stab the driver, who took out a gun and shot him dead. Another man was also seen shooting at Kiyan, but his identity could not be discovered by police. Police arrived four minutes later.

Kiyan's rampage lasted for an estimated eight minutes, and was the deadliest attack of its kind in Israel since the 2017 Jerusalem truck attack.

== Victims ==
The four victims who were killed were:

- Doris Yahbas, 49, a mother of three from Moshav Gilat
- Laura Yitzhak, 43, a mother of three from Beersheva, and the sister of one of the police officers who arrived at the scene
- Rabbi Moshe Kravitzky, a father of four, and Chabad representative who ran a soup kitchen in the neighborhood of Nachal Beka in Beersheva, who had been riding his bicycle
- Menahem Yehezkel, 67, from Beersheva

== Assailant ==
Mohammed Abu al-Kiyan was a Hura-born member of Israel's Negev Bedouin community. A former school teacher, he had been arrested and imprisoned previously between 2016 and 2020, after he was reported to have taught schoolchildren to support the Islamic State and spread pro-ISIL propaganda. At one point Kiyan said that he wished to join the ISIL movement in Syria.

In 2016, Kiyan was sentenced to prison for promoting ISIL. He later apologized for his actions, and was released in 2019.

A relative told Kan 11 that Kiyan's family was "mentally stable" and that they were shocked by the killings.

== Aftermath ==
Hamas and the Islamic Jihad Movement in Palestine both praised the incident, with the former saying that the "battle against the occupation continues and we will not stop." On March 23, the Lebanese Shia militia Hezbollah congratulated Kiyan, whose actions were praised as "a true expression of the spirit of jihad and authentic resistance by the Palestinian people." ISIL did not make a statement.

The attack was condemned by many Israeli politicians, including Naftali Bennett, Ayelet Shaked, Yair Lapid, Isaac Herzog, and the Ra'am party. Yaakov Shabtai said that the police were concerned that possible copycat incidents could occur in the future.

United Nations representative Tor Wennesland said that "there is no justification for violence or terrorism. There is nothing heroic in the killing of civilians and there is no excuse for praising such acts." American ambassador to Israel Thomas R. Nides called it a "despicable terrorist attack". In addition, the attack also received condemnations from Ukrainian ambassador to Israel Yevgen Korniychuk, the Greek Ministry of Foreign Affairs, and Russian president Vladimir Putin.

Kiyan's home in Hura was reportedly subject to a search by the Shin Bet, and Palestinian media outlets reported that many roads in the town were temporarily blocked during the operation. Kiyan's brothers were arrested after suspicions rose that they had given him the knife used in the attack. Channel 12 said that 20 people had been arrested during a police investigation.

The following day, the Cabinet of Israel approved a plan to build 10 new towns in the Negev in response, including the previously proposed Haredi city of Kasif, Israel.

Police minister Omer Bar-Lev caused an uproar when he promised to jail the dead Kiyan at the funeral of a victim. Bar-Lev later publicly apologized for his statement, saying that he was not told he would have to make a speech and had to make up one on the spot.

On March 24, a price tag attack occurred in the Palestinian village of Zeita Jamma'in, with unknown vandals spraying the words "Jews will not be silent when we are murdered" on a mosque. Police said they were investigating the incident as well as an unconfirmed reports of an unsuccessful attempt to set arson to the building.

Two days after the attack, Ministry of Public Security data revealed that the number of applications for a firearms license had risen to 244, in contrast to the normal number of 60.

Former Israeli Prime Minister and opposition figure Benjamin Netanyahu criticized the government's response to the attack, saying that Israeli authorities were afraid to discuss the issue of rising terrorism among Arab-Israelis as it could break down the government's coalition with the United Arab List.

On March 27, two gunmen killed two officers and wounded twelve others in Hadera before they were killed.

== See also ==
- 2022 Bnei Brak shootings
- Timeline of the Israeli–Palestinian conflict in 2022
