= 2022 Bnei Brak shootings =

Terrorist attack in Israel

2022 Bnei Brak attack
- Part of the Israeli–Palestinian conflict
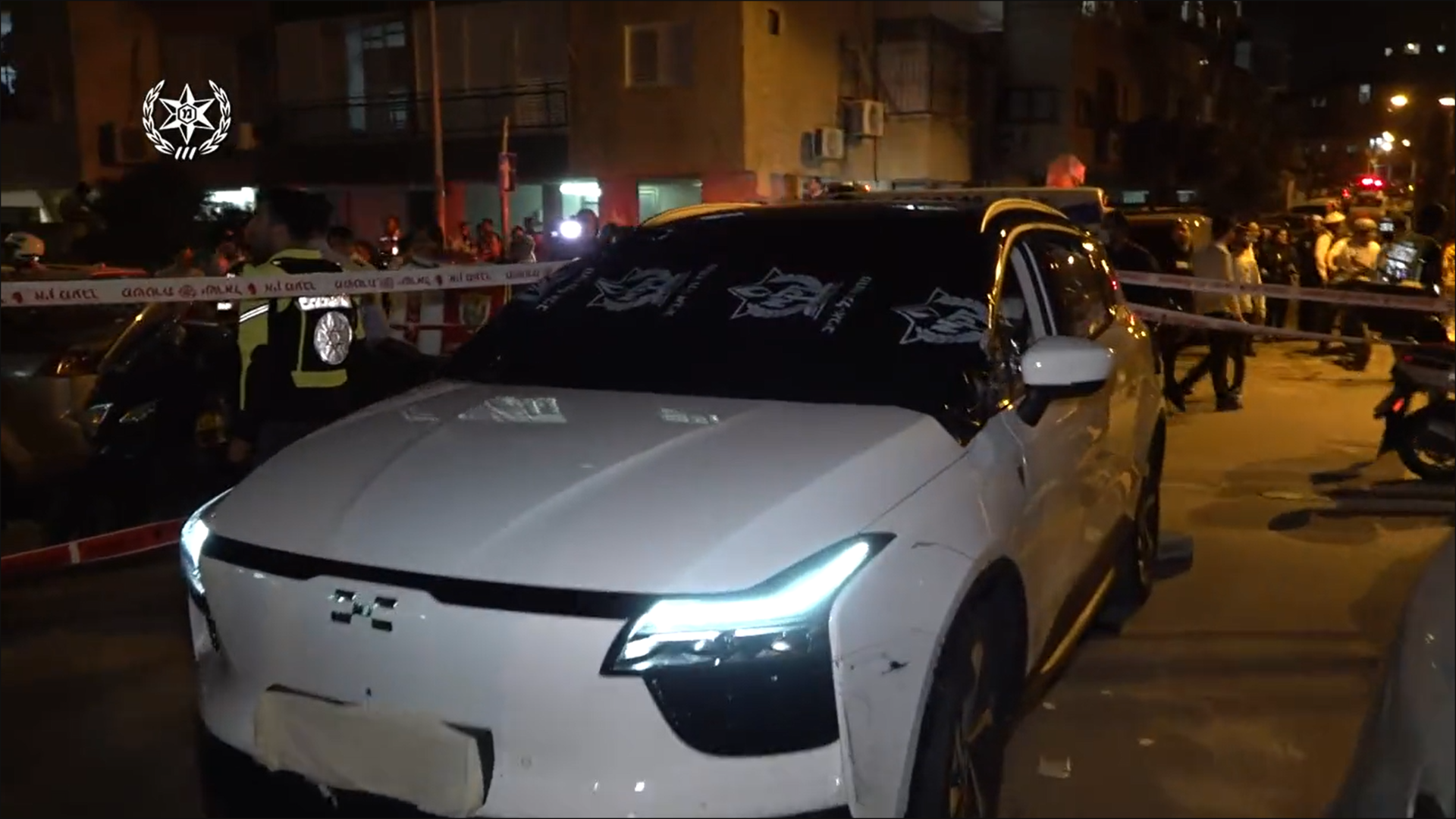
- The attack scene

- The attack site
- Location: 32°05′38″N 34°50′09″E; Bnei Brak, Tel Aviv District, Israel
- Date: 29 March 2022
- Attack type: Mass shooting
- Deaths: 5 (+1 assailant)
- Assailant: Diaa Hamarsheh

On 29 March 2022, a series of shootings took place in Bnei Brak, Israel. Diaa Hamarsheh, a 26-year-old Palestinian from Ya'bad, killed five people.

== Events ==
The attacker infiltrated into Israel by using an agricultural crossing of the Israeli barrier meant for Palestinian farmers to access fields on the other side of the border fence. The attack started at around 8:00 PM local time when Hamarsheh began firing at apartment balconies. The gunman then switched to targeting passersby on HaShnaim street, killing two pedestrians at a grocery store and a car driver. Hamarsheh tried to shoot another resident but the gun jammed.

He then left for Herzl street where he saw 29-year-old rabbi Avishai Yehezkel, who was taking his two-year-old baby in a baby stroller on a walk. Hamarsheh opened fire at Yehezkel, killing him. Hamarsheh engaged in a gun battle with two police officers who were called in to confront him, leading to the terrorist's death. An officer was brought to Rabin Medical Center where he died from his injuries.

The attack came shortly after a man killed four people in Beersheba and two Islamic State terrorists killed two police officers and targeted civilians in a shooting attack in Hadera. The three attacks killed 11 people in total, making it the deadliest week of terrorism in the country since 2006, at the end of the Second Intifada. The Bnei Brak shootings are also the deadliest single terror attack in Israel since the 2014 Jerusalem synagogue attack.

== Assailant ==
The assailant was identified by police as a Palestinian from Ya'bad, a 26-year-old named Diaa Hamarsheh. According to the Jerusalem Post, he was a Fatah affiliate who had been imprisoned in 2015 for charges of supporting terrorism as well as arms trafficking. The al-Aqsa Martyrs' Brigades claimed responsibility for the attack.

In 2011, Hamarsheh had made plans to commit a suicide bombing and established contact with officials from Hamas and the Palestinian Islamic Jihad for assistance. The plan fell apart after a defected PIJ operative called the police on Hamarsheh.

Hamarsheh's family, which traditionally has worked in the tobacco industry, was described by courts as "law-abiding" and family members expressed their shock at the attack. Hamarsheh's father said that he had last seen his son during lunchtime, a few hours before the shootings.

== Aftermath ==
As the results of the attack became known on Israeli TV, multiple videos showing celebrations at Jenin near the terrorist's home village of Ya'abad were posted on social media. These were later documented and distributed in the Israeli media.

Israeli Prime Minister Naftali Bennett released a statement condemning the attack and announced increased security measures over the following days.

Hamas and the Islamic Jihad Movement in Palestine both congratulated the attack.

Neil Wigan and Dimiter Tzantchev, the British and European Union ambassadors to Israel respectively, were the first foreign representatives to condemn the killings.

President of the Palestinian National Authority Mahmoud Abbas said that "the killing of Palestinian and Israeli civilians only leads the situation to deteriorate" in an official statement. French President Emmanuel Macron also condemned the attack and said his thoughts were "with the victims and their loved ones". Abdullah II of Jordan issued a condemnation the following day.

The Ukrainian embassy in Israel confirmed reports that the two pedestrians killed at the grocery store were Ukrainian nationals, and urged for "the upscale of violence and terrorism ... [to] be stopped." The Jerusalem Post wrote that the attack acquired "a boost of international solidarity" for Israel, with denouncements of the attack coming from the Turkish embassy in Tel Aviv, the Indian ministries of Defence and External Affairs, United Nations Secretary-General António Guterres, Japan, and Egypt.

In Beirut, Lebanon, supporters of Hezbollah celebrated on the streets and candies were handed out in celebration of the attack in Bnei Brak.

== See also ==
- Timeline of the Israeli–Palestinian conflict in 2022
