= Timeline of al-Shabaab-related events =

The following is an incomplete list of events related to al-Shabaab militants.

== 2003 ==
- Al-Shabaab founded at an AIAI meeting held in Las Anod, Somaliland/Somalia. Early members included Aden Hashi Farah Ayro of the Ayr clan and Ahmed Abdi Godane of the Isaaq clan.

== 2006 ==
- June 10: The Guardian reports "An unnamed network run by one of Aweys's protégés, Aden Hashi Farah "Ayro" is linked to the murder of four western aid workers and over a dozen Somalis who allegedly cooperated with counter-terror organisations."
- June 15: Al-Shabaab leader Aden Hashi Farah "Eyrow", was said to have taken arms sent from Eritrea
- July 26: Mukhtar Robow or "Abu-Mansur" was reported accepting another load of arms from Eritrea
- July: 720 Somali volunteers were selected by Aden Hashi Farah "Eyrow" to travel to Lebanon to fight against the Israelis. Of those, only 80 returned to Mogadishu. In September, another 20 returned, along with five members of Hizbollah. (see page 24).
- The bankruptcy of a remittance company, Dalsan International, whose staff included the brother of Aden Hashi Farah "Eyrow", involved the suspicious disappearance of $10 million. It was alleged, "an ICU military leader managed to divert a large amount of money to help financially support the organization in their fight for the control of Mogadishu during the June 2006 confrontation with the former counter terrorism alliance" (Also see ARPCT, Second Battle of Mogadishu)

== 2007 ==
- As of January 6, 2007, after the Fall of Mogadishu and Kismayo to the TFG, the leaders of the Shabaab were in hiding still at large. A member of the disbanded group said they once numbered about 1,000 (lower than other claims by former members), but they do not have any weapons any more. Still, there was support for the call of leaders to maintain jihad against the Ethiopians and secular government.
- January 19: Pro-Islamic Courts Union website featured a video describing the reformation of the ICU into the "Popular Resistance Movement in the Land of the Two Migrations" (PRM), alternatively translated and referred to in press reports as the "Somali People's Insurgent Movement" (SPIM) or "Somali People's Resistance Movement" (SPRM). On January 24, Sheikh Abdikadir was announced to be its commander of the Banadir region.
- January 31: Al-Shabaab made a video warning African Union peacekeepers to avoid coming to Somalia, claiming "Somalia is not a place where you will earn a salary—it is a place where you will die."
- February 9: 800 Somali demonstrators in north Mogadishu, where Islamist support was strongest, burned U.S., Ethiopian, and Ugandan flags in protest of the proposed African Union (AU) led and United Nations endorsed peacekeeping mission, known as AMISOM. "Abdirisaq", a masked representative of the resistance group, the PRM, said Ethiopian troops would be attacked in their hotels.

== 2008 ==
- February 28: United States Department of State designates al-Shabaab as a Foreign Terrorist Organization in accordance with section 219 of the U.S. Immigration and Nationality Act (INA).
- August: Battle of Kismayo – After several days of fighting in which scores of deaths were reported, al-Shabaab fighters defeated the militia of Barre Adan Shire Hiiraale and took control of the port city. Kismayo had been held by the TFG since January 2007. The fighting in Kismayo is reported to have displaced an estimated 35,000 people. After the withdrawal of Hiiraale's fighters, al-Shabaab commence a peaceful disarmament process targeting local armed groups that had been contributing to insecurity in Kismayo. The group has been blamed or claimed responsibility for, among other attacks, the February 2008 Bosaso bombings and the 2008 Hargeisa–Bosaso bombings. By late 2008, it was estimated that the group controlled the whole of southern Somalia, except for some pockets of Mogadishu. This was more territory than that controlled by the Islamic Courts Union at the height of their power.
- October 27: Stoning of Aisha Ibrahim Duhulow – After being sentenced to public execution by al-Shabaab courts, Aisha Ibrahim Duhulow was stoned to death by around 50 militants in the southern port town of Kismayo. Initial reports of the killing stated that she was a 23-year-old woman found guilty of adultery. However, Duhulow's father asserted that she was only 13, under the age of marriage eligibility, and that she was arrested and executed after trying to report that she had been raped. The stoning took place in a public stadium with roughly 1,000 bystanders in it, several of whom attempted to intervene but were in the process shot by the militants.
- December: Anwar al-Awlaki sends a communique to al-Shabaab, congratulating them. He thanks them for "giving us a living example of how we as Muslims should proceed to change our situation. The ballot has failed us, but the bullet has not". In conclusion, he writes: "if my circumstances would have allowed, I would not have hesitated in joining you and being a soldier in your ranks".

== 2009 ==
- January: UN-sponsored peace talks concluded in Djibouti with Ethiopians agreeing to withdraw from Somalia and Islamist leader Sharif Ahmed "agreed to stop fighting."
- January 31: Shiekh Sharif Ahmed is elected present of the Transitional Federal Government. Opposing any negotiated settlement with Ethiopia, al-Shabaab declares war on him.
- February 22: 2009 African Union base bombings in Mogadishu: Al-Shabaab carried out a suicide car bomb attack against an African Union military base in Mogadishu, killing at least six Burundian peacekeepers.
- May: Battle of Mogadishu – Al-Shabaab, along with allied group Hizbul Islam, launched a major offensive to take over Mogadishu, leaving hundreds killed and injured and tens of thousands displaced. The group made large gains, taking over most of the capital.
- June 18: 2009 Beledweyne bombing – Al-Shabaab claimed the bombing of the Hotel Medina in Beledweyne, which killed 35 people including Somali security minister Omar Hashi Aden.
- June 18: U.S. Diplomatic Security Daily cable, 09STATE63860, includes the death of Omar Hashi Aden and al Shabaab's shift of tactics to include suicide bombings.
- July 8: A video message featuring an American commander in al-Shabaab, Abu Mansur al-Amriki, is released in which he responds and denounces U.S. President Barack Obama's June 2009 Cairo speech to Arabs and Muslims.
- July 26: Al-Shabaab members ban samosas (sambusas) in regions they control, deeming the snack too Christian on account of its triangular, allegedly Holy Trinity-like shape.
- August 4: Holsworthy Barracks terror plot – Four men allegedly connected with al-Shabaab in Melbourne, Australia were charged over a plan to storm the Holsworthy Barracks with automatic weapons; and shoot army personnel or others until they were killed or captured. Al-Shabaab has denied any connection with the men. It has subsequently been listed as a terrorist organisation in Australia.
- August 11: Reuters reports residents in Marka complain "al Shabaab has been rounding up anyone seen with a silver or gold tooth and taking them to a masked man who then rips them out using basic tools." Residents told Reuters that al-Shabaab declared that since gold and silver teeth "are used for fashion and beauty," they are against Islam.
- September 14: Members of the group were killed in a raid targeting Saleh Ali Saleh Nabhan, who was also killed.
- September 17: 2009 African Union base bombings in Mogadishu – The group claims a second bombing of an AU base, which killed 17 peacekeepers.
- September 20: Al-Shabaab released a 48-minute video, "Labayka Ya Usama," ("Here I am at Your Service, Usama") on transnational jihadi websites. The video is framed around Osama bin Laden's March 2009 audio message "Fight On, O' Champions of Somalia," and features footage of African Union "atrocities" in Somalia and al-Shabaab units undergoing military training. Bin Laden and the Amir (leader) of al-Shabaab, Ahmed Abdi Godane, also known as Abu al-Zubayr, criticize Somalia's interim president, Sharif Ahmed, and the religious scholars of Somalia ('ulama al-Sumaal) for apostasy. Abu Mansoor al-Amriki, the American field commander in the group, is also briefly featured.
- October 15: Al-Shabaab began publicly whipping women for wearing bras that they claim violate Islam as they are deceptive. They sent gunmen into the streets of Mogadishu to round up any women who appear to be being deceptive. The women were then inspected by other women to see if they are being deceptive, if they are then they are ordered to stop.
- November 1: Al-Shabaab announced the establishment of al-Quds Brigade, a military unit specifically tasked with attacking Israel and Jewish interests in Africa. In a rally held the previous week in Mogadishu, a top al-Shabaab official said, "It is time to go for open war against Israel in order to drive them from the holy cities."
- December 3: 2009 Hotel Shamo bombing – Suspected of being behind the bombing of Hotel Shamo in Mogadishu, which kills 24, including three government ministers.

== 2010 ==
- January 2: A man linked to al-Shabaab tried to kill Danish cartoonist Kurt Westergaard at his home in Aarhus, Denmark. Westergaard was not hurt and the assailant was shot, wounded, and arrested.
- February 1: Al-Shabaab declares for the first time that it maintains strong ties with al-Qaeda.
- February 7: The militant group declares jihad on Kenya over allegations that it is training Somali troops although Kenya denied involvement.
- February 15: an al-Shabab suicide car bomber attempted to assassinate Somalia's state minister for defence, Yusuf Mohamed Siyad when he drove his explosive-laden vehicle towards Mr Siyad's car and detonated, injuring two of his security guards.
- March 5: The Government of Canada lists al-Shabaab as a terrorist group.
- March 26: Al-Shabaab claimed responsibility for a roadside bomb that exploded in Mogadishu killing a Somali government official and injuring the deputy DC for security.
- March 27: Al-Shabaab destroys grave sites of foreign soldiers and a prominent Sufi scholar and hides the body of the scholar.
- April 15: The group bans the ringing of school bells as un-Islamic since bell ringing is, in the words of Sheik Farah Kalar, "a sign of the Christian churches."
- June 5: Two New Jersey men, Mohamed Mahmood Alessa and Carlos Eduardo Almonte, who were bound for Somalia seeking to join al-Shabab were arrested at Kennedy International Airport in New York City. The men, who have been charged with conspiring to kill, maim, and kidnap persons outside the United States, allegedly planned to kill American troops who they thought would soon be deployed to Somalia to help fight al-Shabaab.
- July 11: Al-Shabaab claims responsibility for the July 2010 Kampala attacks, which killed 74 people. The Wall Street Journal quotes an International Crisis Group analyst as saying, [Al-Shabaab is] "sending a message: Don't come here propping up the Somalia government ... It's a message of deterrence."
- July 21: Zachary Chesser, the Virginia man who threatened the creators of South Park for satirizing issues surrounding the depiction of Muhammad, was arrested and charged in July 2010 for providing material support to al-Shabaab. Chesser was originally apprehended in New York as he attempted to board an Africa-bound plane. He later told federal authorities that he had attempted to join al-Shabaab in Somalia on two previous occasions.
- July 22: African Union ministers agree to expand AMISOM's mandate from a peacekeeping focus to a peace-enforcement focus that would engage al-Shabaab more directly. The decision was to be discussed at upcoming meetings of the AU Security Council and the UN Security Council for final approval.
- August 23–24: Al-Shabaab is accused of launching attacks in the Somali capital Mogadishu that kill over 300.
- October 28: Al-Shabaab publicly executed two teenage girls, by firing squad, on charges of spying. Residents gave conflicting information regarding the girls' ages, but they were believed to have been 17 and 18 years old.
- December 20: Hizbul Islam and the Somali Islamic party merged with al-Shabaab, retaining the name 'Al-Shabaab'.

== 2011 ==
- February 4: Al-Shabaab launch terrestrial news channel "Al-Kata'ib" to broadcast propaganda. The first footage shown is a recording of confessions of an alleged foreign spy captured in Somalia
- March 5: Al-Shabaab loses control of the border town of Bulo Hawo in a joint offensive conducted by government forces working with AMISOM; the militia had controlled the city for two years beforehand. It was also reported that al-Shabaab was resisting against UN/Government forces for control of three of Mogadishu's sixteen districts, with six still remaining in their control.
- March 16: Abdikadir Yusuf Aar aka Sheikh Qalbi a senior al-Shabab official serving as the group's leader in Juba and Gedo region was killed in Mogadishu.
- April 3: Al-Shabaab loses control of the town Dhobley near the Kenyan border. TFG forces together with Raskamboni movement had been fighting for several days before they took control of the town with support from helicopters of the Kenya Air Force. The same day as al-Shabab lost control of the town Hassan Abdurrahman Gumarey, an al-Shabaab official was killed in action (KIA) in Dhobley.
- June 11: Wanted al-Shabaab operative and al-Qaeda collaborator Fazul Abdullah Mohammed is killed by security forces of the SNA in Afgooye northwest of Mogadishu; one other terrorist was killed and $40,000 worth of U.S. dollars are recovered.
- July 5: Al-Shabaab officially lifts its ban on some aid agencies, but upholds it later in the month vis-a-vis certain organizations. As an explanation for this discrepancy, the group's spokesman Sheikh Ali Dhere indicates that the group has no issue with allowing both Muslim and non-Muslim individuals from helping the drought-impacted people as long as those groups harbor no ulterior motives in doing so. Dhere adds that his organization believes that many aid agencies are exaggerating their relief requirements so as to satisfy their own selfish objectives. He also suggests that the actual nature of many of the relief operations are twofold: first, some of the aid workers are in effect attacking as "spies", while others, including the UN, he charges have a tacit political agenda not in keeping with what they claim to be doing. In addition, Dhere alleges that aid agencies that are providing assistance in neighboring countries are attempting to siphon away the various Muslim peoples of Somalia in order to more easily indoctrinate them into Christianity. Al-Shabaab members are reported to have intimidated, kidnapped and killed some aid workers, leading to a suspension of humanitarian operations and an exodus of relief agents. As a result, AU troops step up efforts in late July 2011 to protect civilians and aid workers from attacks.
- August 6: The Transitional Federal Government's troops and their AMISOM allies reportedly manage to capture all of Mogadishu from the al-Shabaab militants. Witnesses report al-Shabaab vehicles abandoning their bases in the capital for the south-central city of Baidoa. The group's spokesman Sheikh Ali Mohamud Rage describes the exodus as a tactical retreat, and vows to continue the insurgency against the national government. Observers suggest that the pullout may at least in part have been caused by internal ideological rifts in the rebel organization.
- August 9: An ideological split reportedly emerges within al-Shabaab's leadership. Muktar Ali Robow, Hassan Dahir and other southern commanders who hail from the areas of the country worst-hit by the effects of the drought, reportedly want to extend relief efforts to the impacted peoples. However, they are overruled by Ahmed Abdi Godane, a northern commander credited with strengthening the group's ties with al-Qaeda. Observers suggest that the move is a manifestation of Godane's increasing paranoia since the assassination of his close ally Fazul Abdullah Mohammed, the latter of whom Godane suspects was set up by his foes within the organization. Hassan Dahir also proposes that the group change its tactics by "abandoning Mogadishu to launch Taliban style attacks in Pakistan and Afghanistan", but is rebuffed by leaders within the organization.
- October 4: A truck carrying explosive was driven into a government ministry in Somalia killing 139 and injuring 93. The group has claimed responsibility for these attacks.
- October 16: A coordinated operation against al-Shabaab begins between the Somali military and the Kenyan military, as Kenyan troops cross over into Somalia after having met with Somali military officials.
- October 20: Two women, Amina Farah Ali and Hawo Mohamed Hassan, both from Rochester, Minnesota were arrested for sending money and fighters to aid the group.
- November 26: Martyrship video of Mansur Nasir al Bihani, an al-Qaeda veteran of Afghanistan, who trained al Shaabab fighters, is "killed in a clash with American forces off the coast of Somalia."
- December 31: The Transitional Federal Government retakes control of the central town of Beledweyne from the al-Shabaab militants. Somali National Army (SNA) soldiers and around 3,000 allied Ethiopian army troops attacked the city in the early morning, capturing it after hours of fighting. Around 20 people were killed in the battle, mainly consisting of Ethiopian soldiers and al-Shabaab insurgents.

== 2012 ==
- January 6: US Army veteran Craig Baxam is charged in Maryland with attempting to lend material support to al-Shabaab. Baxam had been en route to Somalia when he was detained in Kenya on December 23 and repatriated to the United States.
- January 20: TFG forces and their AU allies launch a successful offensive against al-Shabaab positions on the northern outskirts of Mogadishu. The move was intended to secure the city's outer perimeters from external attack. Two AMISOM soldiers were wounded in the ensuing battle.
- January 9: Reports indicate that al-Shabaab leader Moallim Jinwa is sacked from his leadership position. Over 1,000 frontline troops loyal to the commander subsequently follow him to his home town of Ramcadey in the southern Bay region.
- January 21: Bilal el-Berjawi, a British national and alleged al-Qaeda member and al-Shabaab trainer, is killed in a U.S. drone attack. The car he was traveling in was struck by three missiles on the outskirts of Mogadishu.
- February 9: Al-Shabaab's leader, Mukhtar Abu al-Zubair, announces that the group would be joining al-Qaeda.
- February 19: The Somali embassy in Yemen indicates that 500 al-Shabaab militants have fled to Yemen to join forces with al-Qaeda operatives in the region.
- February 22: TFG and Ethiopian forces capture the strategic southern town of Baidoa, an Islamist stronghold. Al-Shabaab confirm that it had made a "tactical retreat", vowing a guerrilla war in retaliation.
- February 25: Reports indicate that hundreds of al-Shabaab militants, including many foreigners, are fleeing Kismayo and other southern towns for Yemen so as to escape drone attacks and an on-land offensive by allied Somali, Ethiopian, Kenyan and AMISOM forces. Al-Shabaab members deny that they are fleeing and indicate instead that they are regrouping in nearby islands. They also charge that the rumours of their flight are intended to demoralize their fighters.
- March 9: Schoolteacher Shabaaz Hussain convicted of sending over £9,000 in 2010 to three Somalia-bound friends who had left the UK to allegedly join al-Shabaab.
- March 11: Al-Shabaab is blamed for a grenade attack which killed 4 people at a bus station and injured dozens others in Nairobi, Kenya. The grenade was hurled from a vehicle passing the bus station.
- March 17: Abu Mansur al-Amriki (Omar Hammami) releases a new video intimating that he fears fellow al-Shabaab members may assassinate him due to differences in opinion over strategy and sharia law.
- May 25: Somali government troops and their AMISOM allies capture the strategic town of Afgoye from al-Shabaab.
- May 31: Somali government forces and African Union troops from Kenya capture Afmadow from al-Shabaab, a southern town considered important in the military campaign owing to its network of roads that grant access to many different parts of the country. Prime Minister Ali also announces that Kismayo, situated 115 km (71 miles) to the south and the seat of al-Shabaab's headquarters, would be the next likely target, followed by other towns and cities in the larger region.
- June 26: Somali government forces assisted by AMISOM soldiers and tanks capture the al-Shabaab stronghold of Balad, situated 30 km (20 miles) to the north of Mogadishu, in addition to the surrounding villages. The insurgents reportedly fled the area prior to the arrival of the allied troops. Securing Balad gives the Somali authorities and AMISOM control of a key bridge over the Shebelle River leading toward Jowhar and more northerly areas.
- July 11: Somali government troops and their AMISOM allies capture the town of Lanta Buuro from al-Shabaab. Situated approximately 40 km west of Mogadishu, the area had been used as a training base for the militant group. 11 al-Shabaab fighters were killed in the battle; a few allied casualties were also reported.
- August 27: Somali government forces assisted by AMISOM troops capture the port town of Merca from al-Shabaab. Residents indicate that the militants had fled a few hours earlier to Kismayo, which represents the group's last major stronghold.
- August 29: Somali government forces backed by African Union troops battle al-Shabaab militants in the villages of Aglibah, Janaay, Abdulle and Birta Dheer, situated between Afmadow and Kismayo. According to General Ismail Sahardiid, the commander in charge of Somali Army troops in the Lower Jubba region, over 60 insurgents died in the crossfire. Al-Shabaab claims in turn to have killed dozens of government soldiers in the ensuing gun battle. With the allied forces reportedly around 50 kilometers (31 miles) near Kismayo, General Sahardiid indicates that his men are advancing toward the stronghold with caution but expect to capture it within a period of seven days. According to a local resident, al-Shabaab have also positioned armored vehicles on the circumference of the town and are patrolling the area in heavy battle gear and wagons.
- September 1: Somali government forces assisted by African Union troops continue their march toward Kismayo, capturing the southern town of Miido, situated 86 km from the al-Shabaab stronghold. As many as 36 insurgents were reportedly slain in the assault. AMISOM also deny claims that the insurgents had seized back Afmadow, and dismiss as "untrue Al Shabaab propaganda" reports that the militant group had gunned down an AU helicopter. Additionally, an AMISOM spokesman characterizes as a "very despicable and a shameful act" photos released by al-Shabaab showing bodies of four allied soldiers being dragged through the Kismayo streets.
- September 28: According to AMISOM official Col. Cyrus Oguna, the Somali National Army and Kenyan AU naval, air and ground forces launched a surprise attack on Kismayo, capturing the city with little resistance mounted by al-Shabaab. The spokesman asserts that the insurgents incurred "heavy losses" during the offensive, whereas no allied soldiers were wounded or killed. Fighters from the Ras Kamboni militia also reportedly assisted the SNA and AU troops, who led the charge. Al-Shabaab's military operations spokesman Sheikh Abdiasis Abu Musab states that "fierce fighting" is underway between his comrades and the Somali and AMISOM forces. Local residents similarly indicate that the allied troops have seized the port, but the militants are still present elsewhere in the town and are quickly making their way toward the frontlines in vehicles. The Islamist group's propaganda radio station is also still reportedly broadcasting material and allegedly attempting to trick residents into fleeing toward the oncoming Somali government and AMISOM troops. Kismayo is regarded as al-Shabaab's last major stronghold on account of the revenue that the group has been able to generate for itself through exporting charcoal and levying port taxes on imported goods. Col. Oguna indicates that capturing the city "may signal the end of al-Shabab because Kismayo has been the bastion which has financed activities of the al-Shabab in other regions of Somalia". Owing to uncertainty as to who will administer the town after the Islamists have been completely ousted, the AU spokesman adds that the offensive was "meticulously planned".
- October 14: Somali government soldiers assisted by AMISOM troops capture the strategically important town of Wanla Weyn, located 93 km south of Mogadishu. The victory permits a direct route connecting the capital with the recently secured city of Baidoa. According to Somali government and AU officials, it also cuts off al-Shabaab's access to other regions, and denies the militants another key source of funds. Additionally, the allied forces seize control of a former Somali Air Corps (SAC) base, situated within 15 km of Wanla Weyn.
- October 23: Al-Shabaab posts a series of 11 messages on Twitter condemning the United Kingdom for the extradition of radical Muslim cleric Abu Hamza to the United States, threatening a terrorist attack in Britain which would be "bound to eclipse the horrors of 7/7 and 21/7 combined".
- October 29: Somali military sources report that General Mohamed Ibrahim Farah (Gordan) is killed in an ambush attack by al-Shabaab insurgents. The surprise assault occurred in the town of El Waregow, near the port of Marko (Merca). Al-Shabaab did not comment on the assassination.
- December 9: Somali government forces assisted by AMISOM troops capture the al-Shabaab stronghold of Jowhar, situated 90 kilometres (60 miles) north of Mogadishu.
- December 17: Al-Shabaab posts a message on Twitter publicly chatising the group's senior American commander Abu Mansuur al-Amriki (Omar Shafik Hammami) for releasing videos in a "narcissistic pursuit of fame." The tweet also asserts that attempts behind the scenes by the group to talk to al-Amriki were in vain, so al-Shabaab was morally obligated to divulge his "obstinacy".

== 2013 ==
- January 4: Al-Shabaab issue an ultimatum to estranged American commander Abu Mansoor al-Amriki (Omar Hammami) to either turn himself in to his comrades by January 19, or face execution. The move came after al-Amriki had issued a series of criticisms of the group's leaders via several online videos and his abumamerican Twitter account. He accused senior al-Shabaab commanders of keeping the spoils of war for themselves while not sharing it with the rank-and-file insurgents who fought for it, and instead imprisoning them for touching it. He also charged the group's senior commanders of focusing too much on internal struggles in Somalia rather than the global jihad, and of assigning assassins to kill fellow militants.
- January 5: Somali military troops and their Ethiopian army allies fend off an al-Shabaab ambush attempt in an area between the southern towns of Luuq and Garbaharey. According to Somali military representatives, two of their men were killed in the ensuing battle, with seven other soldiers injured. Insurgent casualties are unconfirmed. The allied forces are marching towards the rebel group's last remaining strongholds in the southern Gedo region, including Bardhere.
- January 11: Al-Shabaab fighters kill intelligence officer Denis Allex and two other French soldiers in a botched rescue attempt by French forces. A DGSE operative, Allex had been held since 2009, when he was taken hostage by the insurgents while training Somali government troops. In exchange for his release, al-Shabaab had demanded cessation of French support for the Somali authorities and the complete withdrawal from Somalia of AMISOM forces. According to the French Ministry of Defence, 17 militants were also slain in the crossfire.
- January 29: a suicide bombing on the president's compound killed many people.
- March 18: a similar attack near the president's palace.
- April 14: terrorist attacks in Mogadishu killed 28 people.
- May 5: a suicide bomber attacked a government convoy.
- June 20: Al-Shabab members loyal to Godane clashed with rival factions in the southern port of Barawe. Among the dead were two leaders and co-founders of the group, Ibrahim Haji Jama Mee'aad and Abdul Hamid Hashi Olhayi known as Burhan.
- June 28: UN reports that the al-Shabaab spiritual leader Hassan Dahir Aweys has turned himself in to pro-government officials in the central town of Adado. Local elders assert that he and his militia are stationed in the central Galmudug region, having fled from their own comrades in al-Shabaab-controlled territory after a bout of infighting. According to the Shabelle Media Network, legislators and elders flew into the town in an attempt to persuade Aweys to negotiate with the government. However, the elders indicate that their efforts were unsuccessful.
- June 30: Aweys is arrested by Somali government forces, after flying into Mogadishu for talks with the federal authorities.
- September 4: In a phone interview with VOA, Omar Hammami (Abu Mansour al-Amriki) announces that he has renounced links with both al-Shabaab and al-Qaeda. He cites al-Shabaab commander Godane's assassination attempt against him, as well as the murder by Godane's faction of an individual who reportedly offered shelter to his two wives as the main reasons for his severing of ties with the insurgent group. Hammami also asserts that he still regards himself as a jihadist, and indicates that he is hiding in parts of the southern Bakool and Bay regions.
- September 12: Al-Shabaab member Sheik Abu Mohammed announces that Omar Hammami (Abu Mansour al-Amriki) is killed in an ambush in the southern Bay region. Mohammed asserts that his associates carried out the assassination on the orders of the militant group's leader. However, the insurgents did not offer any evidence of Hammami's death.
- September 19: Somali National Army forces assisted by AMISOM troops seize the Middle Shebelle provincial town of Mahadeey from al-Shabaab. The militants withdrew from the area following an early morning raid by the allied forces, with no casualties reported. It was one of the last urban centers that the insurgent group controlled. The raid is the first major territorial gain by the allied forces in several months after a hiatus in military operations. According to government officials, the offensive represents the start of a mobbing out operation intended to eliminate remnants of al-Shabaab and al-Qaeda.
- September 21: Al-Shabaab claims responsibility over Twitter for the Westgate centre shooting, an armed attack in a Nairobi shopping mall. The insurgent group asserts that its militants shot around 100 people in retaliation for the deployment of Kenyan troops in Somalia, with the Kenyan Red Cross confirming 62 fatalities and over 120 injuries.
- September 25: Somali government forces assisted by AMISOM troops capture the town of Biyo Adde from al-Shabaab. Remnants of the insurgent group withdrew from the Middle Shebelle settlement following a march toward the city by the allied soldiers and their armed trucks. According to local reports, three militants were killed during the skirmish.
- October 5: Al-Shabaab spokesman Sheikh Abdiasis Abu Musab announces that Western naval forces launched an assault on a house in the insurgent stronghold of Barawe, a town situated around 180 km south of Mogadishu. He states that the foreign soldiers had silencer guns, and exchanged gunfire and grenades with the militants before being driven away. Musab later asserts that the attack was launched by the UK SAS unit as well as Turkish special forces, and that one British commander was killed during the raid and four other SAS operatives were fatally wounded. Additionally, a Somali intelligence official indicates that a Chechen al-Shabaab leader was the target of the mission, and that the insurgent commander was wounded during the offensive and one of his guards was killed. Somali police also state that the operation had the approval of the Somali government, and that seven individuals were killed during the mission. Both NATO and EU Navfor deny involvement in the raid, as does a Turkish Foreign Ministry representative. A spokeswoman for the British Defence Ministry also says that she and her colleagues are not aware of any British involvement in the operation. According to another Somali intelligence official, the target of the raid was al-Shabaab leader Ahmed Godane (Mukhtar Abu Zubeyr). A senior US military representative also indicates that Seal Team Six, the special force unit responsible for killing Osama bin Laden in Pakistan in 2011, launched the offensive but later abandoned the mission after coming under more fire than expected. Speaking about the aborted mission, US Secretary of State John Kerry says that the insurgents "can run but they can't hide". A spokesman for the Pentagon likewise asserts that US soldiers had been involved in a counter-terrorism mission in Somalia against a known al-Shabaab member, but does not elaborate. He also indicates that there were no US fatalities during the operation. US officials later confirm that the target of the raid was al-Shabaab commander Abdikadar Mohamed Abdikadar "Ikrima".
- November 10: As an initiative sponsored by Prince Charles and Prince William, the British Army sends 25 members of the 3rd Battalion, Parachute Regiment to Kenya to be based 200 miles north of Nairobi, where they are to train Kenyan rangers engaged in elephant conservation efforts in the face of poaching by al-Shabaab.
- November 16: The Elephant Action League, an independent organization fighting elephant exploitation and wildlife crime, asserts that the illegal export in poached ivory by al-Shabaab via ports in southern Somalia provides the group a monthly income of between US$200,000 to US$600,000. The tusks are cut into blocks and hidden in crates of charcoal, the latter of which is under a UN-imposed embargo. Al-Shabaab is also accused of killing 60 wardens and 30,000 elephants in 2012 alone, and reportedly hiring poachers to kill the elephants and remove the tusks, for which the group pays the poachers $50–100 per kilogram. The majority of the ivory is shipped to customers in China, where it is sold for $3,000 per kilogram.

== 2014 ==
- January 8: Al-Shabaab announces that it is banning the Internet in the areas of Somalia that it controls. Internet Service Providers were given 15 days to terminate their service and warned of sanctions for non-compliance. The insurgent group is on Reporters Without Borders' list of "Predators of Freedom of Information".
- January 26: Sahal Iskudhuq, a senior al-Shabaab commander and confidant of the militant group's spiritual leader, is killed between Barawe and Sablale in Somalia's southern Lower Shabelle region. Abu Mohamed, a leader within the insurgent outfit, indicates that Iskudhuq and his driver died when the vehicle they were in was struck by a drone missile. Mohamed blames U.S. authorities for the attack, with two American military officials later in the day confirming the missile strike. However, the representatives do not specify the target of the operation, and one of the officials indicates that U.S. intelligence was still ascertaining just how efficacious the strike had been. Somalia's Presidential office concurrently issues a press statement welcoming the drone attack by its U.S. partner. Prime Minister Abdiweli Sheikh Ahmed also suggests via Twitter that the missile strike would serve as an effective deterrent against the arrival of additional jihadists, and would impede attempts by the militants to impose a blockade locally.
- February 21: Al-Shabab militants launch a surprise attack on Villa Somalia, when a car loaded with heavy explosives rams into the concrete barrier surrounding the perimeter of the palace. A group of ten armed men penetrate the area where the first bomb hit. All of the attackers are carrying suicide vests and fight a lengthy gun-battle with presidential guards inside the compound. The assault ends when Somali government troops and AMISOM forces reinforce the presidential guards in retaking several key buildings. President Hassan Sheikh Mohamud is unharmed. Government casualties are estimated at five palace guards killed, including the deputy intelligence chief Mohamed Nur Shirbow and Mohamed Abdulle, a close aide to the prime minister. All nine of the attackers were later found and confirmed dead.
- March 6: Somali forces and their Ethiopian AMISOM allies capture Rabdhure in the southwestern Bakool region, a key al-Shabaab stronghold. Witnesses report the arrival in the town of Ethiopian infantrymen and battle tanks, as residents vacate their households ahead of the allied offensive. According to Somali federal government officials, dozens of al-Shabaab insurgents are killed in the ensuing battle, with early reports putting the figure at 12 dead militants. Casualty figures for the Somali army soldiers and AMISOM troops are as yet unconfirmed. The insurgent group had previously used the town and its environs as a base from which to launch attacks. Additionally, an al-Shabaab spokesman confirms that an intense battle for control of Rabhure took place, but does not elaborate on the seizure of the town. He also asserts that the militants managed to fight off an attack on their bases. The allied forces continue their march toward Hudur.
- March 7: Somali government forces assisted by Ethiopian troops capture Hudur, the capital of the southern Bakool province, from al-Shabaab militants. The insurgent group had seized control of the town about a year earlier, following a surprise withdrawal by Ethiopian troops. Hudur since that time served as the militant outfit's largest remaining stronghold. Additionally, AMISOM confirms on Twitter that the allied forces have seized the town. According to AMISOM spokesman Colonel Ali Aden Houmed, the al-Shabaab militants retreated after attempting to engage the allied forces, with three Somali army soldiers incurring minor injuries and no AMISOM casualties. Hudur's Mayor Mohamed Moallim Ahmed also announces that Somali soldiers and Ethiopian AMISOM troops are conducting door-to-door investigations in a joint security operation, with a number of suspects apprehended.
- March 9: Somali government forces assisted by an Ethiopian battalion with AMISOM captured Wajid District in the southern Bakool province. According to the district Governor Abdullahi Yarisow, the siege took a few hours and local residents welcomed the allied forces. He did not specify any casualties. Somali government troops assisted by AMISOM soldiers concurrently engage al-Shabaab militants in a gun battle on the outskirts of Burdhubo in the southern Gedo province. It is the second largest of the remaining towns in the region that are under al-Shabaab control. According to a senior Somali military officer stationed in the province, Col. Abdi Bule Abdi, the allied forces captured three of the insurgents during the operation. The official also indicates that they killed at least six other fighters, but declines to comment on casualties by the joint Somali and AMISOM troops. Within a few hours, the allied forces capture Burdhubo. According to the Gedo region Governor Mohamed Abdi Kali, the Somali and AMISOM troops are now marching toward Bardera, al-Shabaab's largest remaining stronghold and a place of residence of several of its senior commanders.
- March 13: Somali army forces backed by AMISOM troops capture Bulobarte from al-Shabaab. Situated in the Hiran region, the town was the insurgent group's strongest base in central Somalia. According to the tenth Somali national army contingent commissioner, Colonel Mohamed Ammin, the militants vacated Bulobarte thereby allowing the allied forces to seize control of the area. He adds that Somali government soldiers and AMISOM forces are now headed toward the other parts of the region under insurgent control, with the joint troops expecting to remove the militants altogether from Hiran over the next few days. Additionally, the allied forces seize control of Buqdaaqable; the insurgents mount no resistance. The town is located around 90 km from Beledweyne, Hiran's capital.
- May 24: Al-Shabaab militants traveling in a Vehicle Borne Improvised Explosive Device (VBIED) attempt to trespass the entrance to the parliamentary compound in Mogadishu. After the VBIED explodes, the uniformed gunmen in it enter an unoccupied portion of the building. They are immediately counter-attacked by Somali National Army soldiers assisted by AMISOM security personnel, who have been deployed to the area. The ensuing gunfight lasts five hours. All legislators are in the meantime safely evacuated from the premises. Three MPs, Omar Mohamed Finish, Abdalla Boos and Mohamed Moallim, sustain minor injuries from the blast and are taken to local hospitals for treatment. Medical teams are also dispatched onto the scene, and other wounded parties, most of whom are security guards, are receiving treatment at the AMISOM hospital. All of the attackers are killed.
- May 24: A pair of suicide bombers launch an attack on a restaurant popular with foreigners in downtown Djibouti. It was a failed attempt killing only one Turkish national and injuring several westerners. Al-Shabaab claims responsibility for the incident four days later, asserting that the attack was in retaliation for the Djiboutian military's participation in AMISOM, the French military's operations against Islamists in the Sahara, and the American military presence in Djibouti.
- May 31: Somali National Army soldiers and AMISOM troops launch a morning raid on Ceel-Waare and Dhabadey, two towns situated about 18 km from Buloburte on the main road from Beledweyne. According to SNA Colonel Mohamed Ali, the allied forces have liberated the villages from al-Shabaab, confiscated three rifles from the militants, and killed a number of insurgents while others fled ahead of the offensive. The joint forces have in the process freed a dozen civilian-owned trucks carrying commercial goods to Buloburte, one of several supply routes that al-Shabaab had attempted to block.
- July 8: Al-Shabaab militants attempt to breach the gated perimeter of the Villa Somalia presidential compound in Mogadishu with a car bomb. At a joint press conference on the abortive terrorist attack, Information Minister Mustafa Dhuhulow indicates that government soldiers assisted by AMISOM troops managed to repel the raid, with no public officials injured. He adds that security forces killed three of the insurgents in the car park during the Iftar assault, while the fourth was taken into custody. Bomb disposal specialists also reportedly managed to deactivate a suicide vest that one of the attackers had on, which had failed to go off, in addition to several other explosive devices. Dhuhulow likewise states that a thorough investigation into the attack would be launched. Al-Shabaab spokesman Sheikh Abdiasis Abu Musab claims that the militant group's fighters killed 14 soldiers during the raid. Additionally, police Colonel Abdullahi Aden indicates that there was an earlier gunfight near an underground cell holding insurgents. Residents also report hearing intermittent bursts of gunfire into the night. Dhuhulow indicates that chief of intelligence Bashir Gobe and police commander Abdihakim Saaid have been immediately replaced. As part of a broader security reform, Prime Minister Abdiweli Sheikh Ahmed also announces that a new national security minister has been named. Speaking from Villa Somalia, President Hassan Sheikh Mohamud, who was at another location at the time of the attack, dispels as wild rumours suggestions that the insurgents controlled state buildings and of ongoing gunfights. He confirms that state forces assisted by AMISOM troops have secured the compound, and urges the citizenry to work with the government to further strengthen security.
- July 13: Somali national security forces assisted by AMISOM troops capture Saydhelow and Labatan from al-Shabaab. The two villages are situated around 60 km from the Bay region center of Baidoa. According to the Berdaale district governor Mohamed Issack (Caracase), fatalities vis-a-vis the insurgents are unreported, while two government soldiers were wounded during the gunfight. He also indicates that the allied forces seized several armed vehicles from the militants.
- August 17: Somali national army forces assisted by AMISOM troops begin a major military operation against al-Shabaab in central Somalia. The move comes 24 hours after the national chief of military announced the start of new offensives against the insurgent group. Hiran Governor Abdifatah Hassan indicates that the allied forces are slated to liberate the remaining parts of the province that are under militant control, and in the process remove roadblocks that the insurgents erected. An RBC Radio correspondent in Beledweyne also reports that the allied forces have left Buloburte in Hiran and are heading toward Burane in the Middle Shabelle province. Additionally, Hassan indicates that AMISOM's Ethiopian contingent left Elbur in the Galgadud province and are bound for al-Shabaab controlled areas.
- August 25: Somali government forces assisted by Ethiopian AMISOM troops capture Tiyeglow from al-Shabaab. The offensive is part of a larger military cleanup operation dubbed Operation Indian Ocean. Situated around 530 km northeast of Mogadishu along the main road linking Beledweyne and Baidoa, Tiyeglow previously served as a strategic base for the insurgent group. Witnesses indicate that the al-Shabaab fighters mounted no resistance during the raid, fleeing instead to adjacent forested areas. According to AMISOM, the successful military operation deprives the insurgent group of high extortion fees that it would previously charge to vehicles traveling along the town's principal road. The siege also now gives the Somali government full control of the Bakool province. Additionally, AMISOM representatives indicate that, in an attempt to slow the allied forces' march, the insurgents planted roadside explosive devices before fleeing, which they were presently defusing.
- September 1: U.S. special forces and drones attacked a target south of Mogadishu, killing al-Shabaab's leader, Ahmed Godane
- September 6: Al-Shabaab acknowledge that its leader Ahmed Abdi Godane has been killed in a joint U.S.-Somalia operation. The militants concurrently appoint Ahmad Umar (Abu Ubaidah) as his replacement. Additionally, Somali government forces assisted by Ethiopian troops seize El Garas in the Galguduud province from al-Shabaab. According to the Somali military spokesman Mohamed Kariye Roble, the village was a main base for the insurgent group, serving as both a springboard from which it would launch attacks and a supply storage area.
- September 13: The French magazine Le Point reports that French intelligence services assisted the U.S. military in its airstrike that killed al-Shabaab commander Godane. According to the weekly, the French authorities, including President François Hollande, provided support in the form of intelligence and coordination. Among other information, French intelligence officials reportedly forwarded to the Pentagon details as to which exact truck the militant leader was being transported in and on which road he was traveling. France reportedly holds Godane responsible for the abduction of two French intelligence agents in 2009, which ended in the execution of one of the officials, Denis Allex, after an unsuccessful rescue attempt by commandos in 2013. According to Pentagon spokesperson Admiral John Kirby, the Ugandan AMISOM forces had also informed U.S. intelligence as to where Godane and other al-Shabaab leaders were meeting and provided information on the convoy of vehicles in which he was traveling. Al-Shabaab subsequently threaten an attack in Uganda for the UPDF contingent's role within AMISOM and the strike on Godane. The Ugandan security services, with the assistance of the U.S. military and intelligence, also identify and foiled a major al-Shabaab terrorist attack in the Ugandan capital Kampala. They recovered suicide vests, other explosives, and small arms and detained al-Shabaab operatives.
- September 27: The National Intelligence and Security Agency (NISA) offers a $2 million reward to any individual who provides information leading to the arrest of the new al-Shabaab leader, Ahmed Omar Abu Ubeyda. In addition, NISA offers a separate $1 million reward to any person who supplies information that could result in the killing of the militant commander.
- October 5: Somali government officials announce that Somali military forces assisted by AMISOM troops have captured Barawe from al-Shabaab. The port town is situated in the Lower Shabelle province, around 180 km (110 miles) south of Mogadishu. It was the militant group's largest remaining stronghold and served as a strategic hideout, revenue center, and training base for the outfit for the past several years. While many of the insurgents began vacating the area yesterday after getting word of the approaching joint forces, a number reportedly stayed behind to defend their positions. According to the Lower Shabelle Governor Abdulkadir Mohamed Nuur Sidii, al-Shabaab sustained at least 13 fatalities in the ensuing battle, while two of the allied soldiers were wounded. The Somali military official Abdi Mire also confirms that the army is now in full control of Barawe. Most of the soldiers are garrisoned on the outskirts of the city, with a few stationed inside. Additionally, the Governor indicates that the situation is calm, and that the regional administration is slated to meet with local residents and traditional elders. Al-Shabaab military operations spokesman Sheikh Abdiasis Abu Musab does not issue a statement with regard to the militants vacating Barawe. He instead asserts that the insurgents incinerated two government vehicles in an area close to the town, an ambush which the AU indicates was unsuccessful.
- November 22: Al-Shabaab militants attack a bus near Mandera and kill 28 non-Muslims.
- December 2: Al-Shabaab militants murder 36 mostly Christian workers at a quarry near Koromey, Mandera County in northern Kenya. Kenyan President Uhuru Kenyatta subsequently fires his Interior Minister Joseph Ole Lenku, replacing him with retired general Joseph Nkaissery, and accepts the resignation of his police chief David Kimaiyo.
- December 2: Somali government forces and AMISOM troops seize El-Deer town in the Middle Shabelle province from al-Shabaab. Residents indicate that the locality was taken without any fighting. The insurgents also do not issue any statement on the raid. According to security officials, the capture of the town represents an important stage in the joint forces' effort to liberate southern and central areas from the militants.
- December 7: Kenyan Anti-Terrorism Police Unit officers confess to al-Jazeera that they are responsible for almost 500 extrajudicial killings. The murders reportedly total several hundred homicides every year. They include the assassination of Abubaker Shariff Ahmed "Makaburi", an al-Shabaab associate from Kenya, who was among 21 Muslim radicals allegedly murdered by the Kenyan police since 2012. According to the agents, they resorted to killing after the Kenyan police could not successfully prosecute terror suspects. In doing so, the officers indicate that they were acting on the direct orders of Kenya's National Security Council, which consists of the Kenyan President, Deputy President, Chief of the Defence Forces, Inspector General of Police, National Security Intelligence Service Director, Cabinet Secretary of Interior, and Principal Secretary of Interior. Kenyan President Uhuru Kenyatta and the National Security Council of Kenya members deny operating an extrajudicial assassination program. Additionally, the officers suggest that Western security agencies provided intelligence for the program, including the whereabouts and activities of government targets. They assert that Britain supplied further logistics in the form of equipment and training. One Kenyan officer within the council's General Service Unit also indicates that Israeli instructors taught them how to kill. The head of the International Bar Association, Mark Ellis, cautions that any such involvement by foreign nations would constitute a breach of international law. The United Kingdom and Israel deny participation in the Kenyan National Security Council's reported extrajudicial killing program, with the UK Foreign Office indicating that it has approached the Kenyan authorities over the charges.
- December 20: The United Nations Security Council committee on Somalia removes former al-Shabaab affiliate Mohamed Said Atom from its 1844 sanctions list. The decision came after Atom had over the summer defected from and renounced his allegiance with the militant group. According to Minister of Information Mustafa Duhulow, the announcement was prompted by lobbying on the part of the Federal Government of Somalia, which had negotiated with UN officials and member states to pardon individuals like Atom who have since disavowed extremist links.
- December 25: Al-Shabaab militants attacked AMISOM's main Halane base in Mogadishu near the city airport, prompting an exchange of gunfire with soldiers. The compound also serves as an office for local UN operations, with the airport and British and Italian embassies situated nearby. Fighters were targeting a Christmas party inside the complex. AMISOM spokesman Col. Ali Aden Houmed indicates that at least eight militants entered the area. However, a Western diplomat within the compound states that its walls were not penetrated. Mohamed Abdi, a policeman at the adjacent airport, also reports hearing explosions. Nine people were killed in the attacks. According to Houmed, five of the attackers were killed, with three gunned down and two blowing themselves up beside a fuel depot; the remaining three militants may have escaped. UN spokesman Aleem Siddique likewise states that all UN personnel are safe. Additionally, roads leading to the airport have been sealed.
- December 29: The U.S. Pentagon announces that its jets have conducted an airstrike targeting a senior al-Shabaab commander in Somalia. Military spokesman Rear Admiral John Kirby does not specify the identity of the targeted insurgent leader, but indicates that the raid was carried out in the southern town of Saakow. He adds that U.S. security personnel have not discerned any civilian casualties, and that they are still gauging the strike's relative impact. Somalia's National Intelligence and Security Agency announces a few hours later that the raid killed the al-Shabaab intelligence chief Abdishakur (Tahlil). According to security officials, the slain militant leader was part of a unit that was tasked with carrying out suicide attacks. He had reportedly been assigned the position only a couple of days prior, after his predecessor Zakariya Ahmed Ismail Hersi turned himself in to police in the southwestern Gedo region. The spy agency also indicates that two other al-Shabaab insurgents were killed during the airstrike. Pentagon press secretary Kirby later confirms that Tahliil Abdishakur was killed by Hellfire missiles that were fired through an unmanned U.S. aircraft. Given the fact that Tahliil served as the head of al-Shabaab's elite Amniyat unit, Kirby suggests that the militant's death will substantially impact al-Shabaab's ability to effectively carry out attacks against government, civilian and international targets.

== 2015 ==
- January 1: Somali government forces and al-Shabaab militants engaged in a gunfight near the southern town of Kurtunwarey. Al-Shabaab commander Ibrahim Filey is killed during the skirmish, in addition to three other insurgents.
- January 8: AU Special Representative to Somalia Ambassador Maman Sidikou announced that following joint military operations by Somali government forces and AMISOM troops, al-Shabaab has lost control of over 80% of territory it previously held. He indicates that the insurgents have now concentrated their capacity in the Lower Juba province. Sidikou does not specify when exactly the cleanup operations against al-Shabaab will conclude, but they are expected to be launched within a few weeks.
- January 31: Somali government forces engaged al-Shabaab militants on the outskirts of Baladwein in the south-central Hiran province. According to the commander of the Somali National Army's tenth battalion Colonel Isak Idris, the state troops killed a number of insurgents while sustaining some wounds. Total casualties are uncertain. Al-Shabaab does not issue a statement on the skirmish. Idris also indicates that they have flushed out the militants from the area.
- January 31: Governor of the Lower Shebelle province Abdulkadir Mohamed Nor "Sidi" announces that an airstrike has struck an al-Shabaab convoy and training base in the Dugale village. According to Nor, a U.S. aircraft fired at least three missiles, respectively targeting a fighting vehicle, a residence containing foreign fighters, and a militant installation where they were wrapping up a training course. He asserts that between 45 and 60 insurgents are in the process killed. Their training base is also demolished. Additionally, a local resident reports that the area's inhabitants vacated the area upon hearing the loud explosion. Bay province official Ahmed Adan later specifies that the airstrike was targeting a convoy of senior al-Shabaab leaders near Dinsoor. According to Adan, two local residences as well as a militant training base were targeted. He also indicates that he has ground confirmation that a number of the group's fighters and one senior commander were killed during the aerial attack, which took place as the insurgents were traveling in vehicles toward the training facility. The identity of the slain al-Shabaab leader is not yet known. The Dinsoor locality was one of the last remaining urban areas under militant control. Pentagon Press Secretary Rear Admiral John Kirby later confirms that the U.S. Hellfire missile strike was targeting al-Shabaab's chief of external operations and planning for intelligence and security, Yusuf Dheeq. He indicated that whether the militant leader was slain was being assessed, and that there appeared to be no civilian casualties. The Federal Government of Somalia subsequently issues a press statement officially confirming that Dheeq has been killed.
- February 1: Somali National Army commander in the Gedo province Jama Muse announced that government forces have captured a senior al-Shabaab official. Muse does not specify the insurgent leader's identity. However, he indicated that the rebel commander was in charge of bomb-making. The seizure comes seven days after President Hassan Sheikh Mohamud called for more militant defections.
- February 3: Somali National Army troops apprehend al-Shabaab commander Olow Barrow in the Middle Shabelle province. Senior military official Mohamed Osman indicated that the insurgent leader had been injured during a skirmish near Fidow locality. Barrow was slated to be transferred to Mogadishu for interrogation.
- February 18: Government forces launched a security operation in the Bakool province, seizing two senior al-Shabaab commanders. According to the Somali National Army head of operations in the region Abdiladhif Mohamed Botan, the apprehended insurgent leaders are Sheikh Hassan Dhubow and Sheikh Abdi Barow. Botan indicates that the pair are among the main operatives within al-Shabaab, and that state troops encountered heavy gunfire while attempting to capture them. Al-Shabaab do not issue a statement on the raid. Analysts suggest that the security operation may represent a breakthrough, which significantly hinders the proper functioning of local militant cells.
- February 20: Central Hotel attack – Al-Shabaab militants launched an attack on the Central Hotel in Mogadishu, when a vehicle laden with explosives smashes into the compound's gate. Gunmen then penetrate the premises and open fire in the hotel mosque. Police Major Nur Mohamed indicates that a suicide bomber also blows himself up within the complex. 20 people are reportedly killed in the attack, including the local deputy mayor and a legislator according to the government. Minister of Information Mohamed Hayir Maareeye states that Deputy Prime Minister Mohamed Omar Arte and other federal ministers were at the time in the compound, but survived the raid. An al-Shabaab spokesman later claims responsibility for the attack, indicating that the militants had targeted the officials during prayer-time as retribution for "apostasy". Security subsequently cordon off the area around the hotel.
- February 22: Al-Shabaab released a propaganda video calling for a lone wolf attack on the Mall of America in Bloomington, Minnesota, the West Edmonton Mall in Alberta, Canada and other Western shopping centers.
- February 24: Somali government forces assisted by AMISOM troops carry out a security operation in vicinity of Mahas town. According to the local district commissioner Mohamed Muumin Sanay, the sweep is successful, with the joint forces killing an al-Shabaab tax collection leader after an exchange of gunfire. He adds that the troops are also pursuing other militants in the area. Al-Shabaab does not issue a statement on the raid. The security sweep is part of a larger cleanup operation in the Hiraan province.
- March 7: The Federal Government of Somalia announces that it will deploy drones in its military operations against al-Shabaab. According to Ministry of Security spokesperson Mohamed Yusuf Osman, the Somali National Army is slated to use the unmanned aerial vehicles separately from AMISOM. However, he does not specify the quantity or provenance of the equipment. The drones will target the insurgent group's remaining bases and installations in the countryside.
- March 12: A US drone strike near Abu-Halul reportedly killed two senior al-Shabaab commanders. The militants were traveling in a vehicle on the outskirts of the village, which is situated between Bardere and Dinsoor. The identity of the two insurgent leaders is uncertain, as they were incinerated in the blast. However, one of the men is believed to be Aden Garaar, the head of external operations of al-Shabaab. No party has claimed responsibility for the airstrike. Additionally, neither the Somali federal government nor al-Shabaab issue a statement on the raid. Unnamed U.S. officials later confirmed that Garaar was targeted and killed in the airstrike, which was carried out by a Predator unmanned aerial vehicle using Hellfire missiles. The slain militant commander had reportedly orchestrated the 2013 Westgate shopping mall attack in Nairobi.
- March 13: Somali National Army forces and al-Shabaab militants engaged in a skirmish on the perimeter of Bur-Dubo. The rebels reportedly waylaid a Somali military convoy as it was moving towards the Gedo province town. According to army officials, the state forces managed to repel the insurgents during the armed attack, which lasted several hours. Military officer Osman Nooh Haji indicated that army soldiers in the process killed three al-Shabaab members, including local commander Mohamed Musa. The militant group did not issue a statement on the raid.
- March 27: Makka al-Mukarama hotel attack – Al-Shabaab insurgents attacked the Hotel Makka al-Mukarama in Mogadishu. After a car laden with explosives detonated, five armed militants penetrated the grounds. Security agents with the National Intelligence and Security Agency's elite Gaashaan unit subsequently stormed the hotel and begin engaging the militants. According to the Minister of Information Mohamed Abdi, four of the gunmen were killed in the standoff, including the suicide car bomber, as well as four government soldiers, four hotel guards, five civilians and Somalia Ambassador to the UN Human Rights Office in Geneva, Yusuf Mohamed Ismael Bari Bari. Injuries included around 20 wounded soldiers, state officials and hotel personnel. The security forces rescued over 50 hotel guests, including Somalia's Ambassador to Germany Mohamed Tifow. Al-Shabaab concurrently claimed responsibility for the raid, with the group's spokesman Sheikh Ali Mahamud Rage emailing that some militants had survived the attack and escaped the scene. Al-Shabaab's military operations spokesman Abdiasis Abu Musab also indicates that the insurgents were targeting government officials only and had left civilians unharmed. State representatives subsequently display the bodies of the slain militants at a press gathering, deeming the counter-terrorist operation a success. Government forces and AMISOM troops cordoned off roads flanking the hotel.
- March 30: Senior al-Shabaab officer Bashaan Ali Hassan ("Mohamed Ali") turned himself in to Somali National Army officials in Hudur.
- April 2: Garissa University College attack – Al-Shabaab gunmen launched an attack on Garissa University College in Garissa, Kenya. A spokesman for the group described the rampage as retribution for non-Muslims invading Muslim territory. According to Kenya's interior minister, 147 victims were killed in the attack.
- April 2: The Federal Cabinet of Somalia passed a new anti-terrorism law. The bill was originally formulated by the Ministry of National Security, and aims to empower the national security agencies to efficaciously handle al-Shabaab and other anti-peace elements. It was slated for deliberation and approval in the Federal Parliament.
- April 10: The Federal Government of Somalia offered a bounty for the capture of al-Shabaab commander Ahmed Diriye. It also offered rewards for information on the whereabouts or leading to the arrest of several other of the militant group's senior leaders.
- April 14: 2015 Ministry of Higher Education attack – A suicide car bomb detonated at the gate of the Ministry of Higher Education and Ministry of Petroleum and Resources building in Mogadishu. Armed insurgents in military fatigues then penetrate the premises. However, no senior government officials are on the grounds. According to witnesses, there are between two or three gunmen, who are armed with light and heavy weapons and have on suicide vests. Special Forces units arrive at the area shortly afterwards, and quickly recapture control of the compound after a brief exchange in gunfire with the militants. Interior Minister Abdirizak Omar indicates that the security forces also rescued dozens of individuals. A federal government spokesman states that casualties include seven al-Shabaab militants, eight pedestrians and two soldiers. Around 15 people are also wounded and are taken to the hospital for treatment. Al-Shabaab claims responsibility for the attack.
- April 20: Garowe attack – Militants planted a bomb in a UN van in the northeastern city of Garowe. According to police Colonel Ali Salad, at least seven workers were killed in the ensuing blast. Four people were injured. Police officer Yusuf Ali indicates that the explosive device was lodged under a seat in the vehicle and detonated via remote control. Al-Shabaab later claimed responsibility for the attack through its radio station. The Puntland administration subsequently appoints a five-member governmental committee to probe the circumstances surrounding the attack.
- May 4: The Somali government issues a directive to local media outlets to thereafter refer to al-Shabaab as UGUS, short for Ururka Gumaadka Ummadda Soomaaliyeed ("the Group that Massacres the Somali People"). The reason provided for the proposed name change is that al-Shabaab ("the youth") had a positive connotation in Arabic, and as such was too good a name for the militant group. Al-Shabaab replies that the government should instead be known by the same acronym, but with a different meaning ("the Group that Subjects the Somali People to Humiliation"). The state-run Somali National Television and Radio Mogadishu have already reportedly been using the acronym.
- May 8: Somali government forces and al-Shabaab militants engage in a skirmish in the Hudur district. According to the local deputy district commissioner for security affairs Adan Abdi Abaaray, the state troops have captured the area from the insurgents. He indicates that they killed several of the anti-peace elements. The official also announces that the government forces are now heading toward other areas in the district to flush out the remaining militants.
- June 14: Battle of Baure
- June 26: Battle of Leego – Al-Shabaab militants attacked an AMISOM base with a car bomb.
- July 26
  - Al-Shabaab's spokesman for military operations, Sheikh Abdiasis Abu Musab said that the group was responsible for carrying out two attacks in Mogadishu that resulted in the gunmen killing lawmaker, Abdullahi Hussein and his bodyguard as well as an official from the prime minister's office.
  - Jazeera Palace Hotel bombing – In a separate attack, al-Shabaab militants attacked by driving a car packed with explosives through the hotel gate resulting in the death of 13 people, said a first responder and the rebel group. A witness said blood and pieces of flesh were spattered around the site of the blast that targeted the Jazeera hotel. Nearby was the wreckage of four cars. "We have carried 13 dead people and 21 others who were injured, some seriously," an ambulance worker Abdikadir Abdirahman told Reuters. A police officer, Major Nur Osoble, told Reuters a suicide car bomb had rammed the gates of the hotel, damaging the facade. "It is a response to attacks and helicopter bombing against al-Shabaab by AMISOM and the Somali government," Sheikh Abdiasis Abu Musab, al-Shabaab's military operations spokesman, told Reuters. The popular Jazeera hotel has been targeted on previous occasions. The blast sent a plume of smoke rising above the coastal capital. Sporadic gunfire was heard shortly after the attack.
- September 1: Battle of Janale
- November 1: Sahafi Hotel attacks

== 2016 ==
- February 13: Daallo Airlines Flight 159: Al-Shabaab claimed responsibility for the failed suicide bombing, which occurred on February 2. The group stated that they originally intended to attack a Turkish Airlines Flight and that they were targeting Western intelligence officials and Turkish NATO soldiers who were on board.
- March 31: A U.S. drone strike in southern Somalia killed Hassan Ali Dhoore and two others near the Kenyan border. Dhoore was thought to have facilitated the 2014 Christmas attack in Mogadishu.

== 2017 ==
- June: 59 Puntland soldiers were killed in Af Urur.
- July: Nine civilians were killed in Kenya.
- November 21: U.S. drone strike against camp in Somalia.

== 2019 ==
- January 15–16: Nairobi DusitD2 complex attack
- December 28: December 2019 Mogadishu bombing: A truck bomb attributed to al-Shabaab killed at least 85 people and wounded at least 140 in Mogadishu.

== 2020 ==
- January 5: Camp Simba attack: One United States service member and two contractors were killed during an al-Shabaab attack on the Kenya Defense Forces' Manda Bay Airfield at Camp Simba in Lamu County, Kenya. Additional United States assets of the East Africa Response Force (EARF) were deployed from Camp Lemonnier, Djibouti, to secure the Manda Bay Base and augment security.
- January 7: Four Kenyan school children were killed in Isiolo, Kenya in a gunfight between police and al-Shabaab militants.
- January 13: Al-Shabaab militants killed three teachers and abducted another in Kamuthe Region in Garissa, Kenya.
- December 10: United States Africa Command (AFRICOM) killed multiple al-Shabaab explosives experts in two airstrikes on a compound near Jilib, Somalia.
- December 24: Somali security forces killed seven al-Shabaab militants in an operation in Garbaharey in the southern region of Gedo.

== 2021 ==
- January 31: 80 year old General Mohamed Nur Galal, who ousted Siad Barre in 1991, was killed in an attack on Hotel Afrik in Mogadishu. At least five civilians and four gunmen were killed and ten people were injured in the attack. Al-Shabaab said that Galal was their main target.
- February 7: Al-Shabaab claimed responsibility for a roadside bomb which killed twelve people from the National Intelligence and Security Agency (NISA), in the Hodan district of Mogadishu, where political leaders had met to try to resolve a deadlock over the presidential elections which were due to be held on 8 February. Fatalities included Abdirashid Abdunur, the head of NISA in Dhusamareb.
- March 5: March 2021 Mogadishu bombing
- June 15: June 2021 Mogadishu bombing
- November 25: November 2021 Mogadishu bombing
  - December 13: Al-Shabaab took over the town of Mataban, in central Somalia, after the withdrawal of government forces without providing combat, after the seizure of two other villages in the area in the previous hours. Al-Shabaab has indicated that it has broken into Mataban after taking over Bada and Bergadid, in the Hiiraan region. Residents of the city cited have confirmed the entry of Al Shabaab into the city and added that the militiamen have raised their flag at the administrative offices and at the Police headquarters to confirm their control of the town.

== 2022 ==
- February 19: February 2022 Beledweyne bombing
- March 23: March 2022 Somalia attacks
- April 22: April 2022 Mogadishu bombing
- Late July and early August: 2022 al-Shabaab invasion of Ethiopia
- August 19: August 2022 Mogadishu attack: An attacked on The Hayat Hotel killed at least 21 people. Al-Shabaab said that the hotel was helping the government by providing goods to them.
- October 29: October 2022 Mogadishu bombings
- December 11: Two people, a father and son, were killed and three people—including a police official—were injured.

== 2024 ==
- January 10: Al-Shabaab extremists captured a United Nations helicopter after it made an emergency landing in al-Shabaab territory killing one person and capturing five others in the process. The seventh person on the helicopter became presumably dead after they went missing. After capturing the helicopter, extremists looted the helicopter and confiscated important items before burning it.
- January 16: An al-Shabaab suicide bomber detonated his suicide vest in front of the al-Hindi restaurant outside the Mayor of Mogadishu's office in Mogadishu, Somalia, killing three people and injuring two others.
- January 21: Three al-Shabaab militants are killed by a United States drone strike near Kismayo, Somalia, after a request from the Somali Government.
- February 6: 2024 Mogadishu market bombing
  - Ten people are killed and at least twenty others are injured after four bombings inside the Bakaara Market in Mogadishu, Somalia. Al-Shabaab is the suspected perpetrators.
- February 7: Three people are killed and at least ten others are injured after a suicide bombing in Afgooye, Somalia. Al-Shabaab is suspected as the perpetrator.
- February 10: Five people are killed and ten others are injured after an al-Shabaab attacker opened fire at a military base before the attacker was killed in a shootout.
- March 14: 2024 Mogadishu SYL Hotel attack and siege
  - An al-Shabaab suicide bomber detonated an explosive device outside the SYL Hotel in Mogadishu, Somalia, before five gunmen raided the hotel in a 13-hour siege. In total, fourteen people were killed, including all six attackers.
- March 19: 39 al-Shabaab leaders are killed after two Somali National Army airstrikes in Afgooye, Somalia.
- March 23: 2024 Busley army base attack
  - On March 23, 2024, al-Shabaab insurgents attacked the Somali Armed Forces base in Busley, Lower Shabelle, Somalia. Al-Shabaab claims they killed 57 soldiers, while the Somali Government claims 10 soldiers died in the attack. Ten insurgents were also killed.
- June 8: 2024 El Dher attack
  - Al-Shabaab militants attacked four military bases and overran the town of El Dher for several hours killing at least 25 people, including five Somali National Army soldiers.
- July 13: 2024 Mogadishu prison attack
  - Eight people are killed and twenty-one others are injured after a shootout between Somali Armed Forces soldiers and al-Shabaab militants after militants tried to escape from prison.
- July 14: Top Coffee bombing
  - Nine people were killed by a car bomb outside a Mogadishu café that was showing the Euro 2024 final.
- July 22: At least 35 Somali Armed Forces soldiers and over 80 al-Shabaab militants were killed during three attacks on military bases near Kismayo, Jubaland, Somalia.
- August 2: 2024 Lido Beach attack
  - At least 56 people, including a soldier and six attackers are killed after a suicide bombing and mass shooting at the Beach View Hotel on Lido Beach, Mogadishu, Somalia.
- August 16: A roadside explosion occurred in the Sariitow village area near Awdiinle town, west of Baidoa in South West State, resulting in at least 12 deaths and nine injuries. The blast targeted a pickup truck used by security forces. The al-Shabaab militant group claimed responsibility for the attack.
- August 17: 2024 Mogadishu tea shop bombing
  - At least twenty people were killed and over ten others were injured when a suicide bomber detonated an improvised explosive device at a tea shop in Mogadishu, Somalia.
  - Separate Incident: At least four people were killed and several others injured in a bomb explosion at a khat market in the city center of Afgooye, Lower Shabelle. Eyewitnesses reported that two bombs were thrown into the market as traders gathered on the busy streets.
- August 21: Al-Shabaab claimed responsibility for a suicide car bombing that killed 10 people, including seven NISA security officers and two civilians. Several other people were also injured. The explosion happened near a security checkpoint on the busy Mogadishu–Afgoye highway.
- August 31: Al-Shabaab bombed several businesses in Mogadishu, Somalia.
- September 14: Five people are killed and eight others are injured in multiple roadside explosions in Mogadishu, Somalia. Al-Shabaab are the suspected perpetrators.

== 2025 ==
- March 11: 2025 Beledweyne hotel attack
- March 18: Attempted assassination of Hassan Sheikh Mohamud
- May 18: 2025 Mogadishu military base bombing

== 2026 ==
- 2 March: Somali National Armed Forces (SNAF), supported by troops from the African Union Support and Stabilization Mission in Somalia (AUSSOM) and international partners, captured the settlements of Daarusalaam and Mubarak in the Lower Shabelle region from al-Shabaab. The operation, known as Operation Rolling Thunder, targeted locations used by the group as strongholds and bases for its activities.
- 2 April: Somali forces and AUSSOM troops captured Salaad Cusmaan Macalin, also known as “Sahm”, an al-Shabaab battalion commander, during an operation on the outskirts of Mubarak in Lower Shabelle. According to AUSSOM, he had been involved in planning and conducting militant operations, particularly in Mogadishu and surrounding areas.
- 14 April: Somalia's Ministry of Defence announced that Somali forces, supported by regional security forces and international partners, had killed 27 al-Shabaab militants during operations in the Lower and Middle Jubba regions. The ministry stated that airstrikes supported the ground operations and that weapons, military equipment and landmines had been seized. The reported casualties were not independently verified.
- 1 October: Somalia's National Intelligence and Security Agency (NISA) announced that it had killed Bashir Ahmed Haji Nunow, described by the agency as a former head of al-Shabaab's Amniyaat security and intelligence wing, during an operation in Jilib, Middle Juba region. In a statement published on 7 October, NISA accused Nunow of involvement in planning several attacks in Somalia, including the October 2017 Mogadishu bombing. These allegations were reported by the agency and were not independently established in the available reporting.
