= Beledweyne bombing =

Beledweyne bombing or Beledweyne attack may refer to:

- 2009 Beledweyne bombing
- 2013 Beledweyne attacks
- February 2022 Beledweyne bombing
- March 2022 Somalia attacks
- September 2022 Beledweyne attack
- October 2022 Beledweyne bombings
- 2023 Beledweyne bombing
- 2025 Beledweyne hotel attack

== See also ==
- 2022 Beledweyne bombings (disambiguation)
