= 2023 Beledweyne bombing =

Bombing in Somalia

- Part of the Somali Civil War
- 2023 Beledweyne bombing (Somalia)
- Location: Beledweyne, Hiran, Somalia
- Date: 23 September 2023
- Attack type: Truck bombing
- Deaths: 30
- Injuries: 50+
- Perpetrator: Al-Shabaab

On 23 September 2023, at least 30 people were killed in a truck bombing in Beledweyne, Somalia.

== Background ==
Beledweyne is a town in Hiran, Hirshabelle State, Somalia. Jihadist group al-Shabaab carried out major attacks there in June 2009, October and November 2013, February 2022, March 2022, September 2022 and October 2022.

== Bombing ==
On 23 September 2023, a truck was stopped at the checkpoint at Nur Hawaad neighborhood, Beledweyne, but refused to pay the tax. A bomb on the truck exploded there, killing at least 30 people and injuring over 50 others. The explosion also resulted in the destruction of civilian homes, vehicles, and commercial establishments. Around a kilometre of the area's structures from the explosion were damaged. Twenty injured people were moved to Beledweyne hospitals, while another 20 were in critical condition. Because Beledweyne's medical services were severely lacking, seriously injured people were transferred to Mogadishu for better treatment.

Former president of Hirshabelle Mohamed Abdi Waare, expressed strong condemnation of the bombing.
