= 2022 Beledweyne bombings =

2022 Beledweyne bombings may refer to:

- February 2022 Beledweyne bombing
- March 2022 Somalia attacks
- September 2022 Beledweyne attack
- October 2022 Beledweyne bombings

== See also ==
- Beledweyne bombing (disambiguation)
