= Battle of Beledweyne =

Battle of Beledweyne may refer to:

- Battle of Beledweyne (2006)
- Battle of Beledweyne (2008)
- Battle of Beledweyne (2010)
- Battle of Beledweyne (2011)
