= Hassan Dhuhul =

Somali politician (died 2022)

Hassan Dhuhul (died 23 March 2022) was a Somali politician and former MP who was killed in the March 2022 Somalia attacks.

== See also ==
- Amina Mohamed Abdi
