= 2008 Hargeisa–Bosaso bombings =

Terrorist incident in Somalia

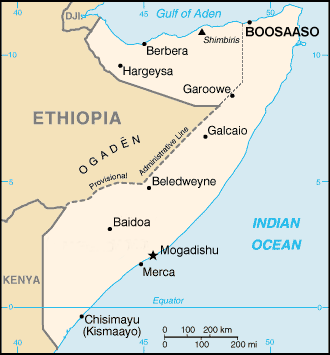
- Location of Bosaso and Hargeisa
- Location: Bosaso, Somalia; Hargeisa, Somaliland
- Date: October 29, 2008
- Target: Bosaso: Puntland Intelligence Service offices Hargeisa: presidential palace, Ethiopian consulate, UNDP offices
- Attack type: Suicide car bombings
- Deaths: 30
- Injuries: 80

The Hargeisa–Bosaso bombings occurred on October 29, 2008, when six suicide bombers attacked in coordinated car bombings targets in Hargeisa, the capital of Somaliland, and the Puntland port of Bosaso in northeastern Somalia. The bombings killed at least 30 people.

== Attack details ==
These were suicide attacks. Two car bombs destroyed two centres of the anti-terrorism unit. There are casualties but we have to investigate and we cannot give more information at the moment.

— Presidential adviser Bile Mohamoud Qabowsade

Targets in Hargeisa include the presidential palace, the Ethiopian consulate, and UNDP offices, while in Bosaso the offices of the Puntland Intelligence Service were hit.

Twenty people were killed at Ethiopia's consulate in Hargeisa, while at least five were killed in the synchronized blasts at the local president's office and a UN building there. Two of the dead in the latter location were UN staff members, a driver and a security adviser. Six UN staff members were also injured in the blast that blew off the roofs of the UN compound. The UN humanitarian coordinator for Somalia, Mark Bowden, said: "While Somalia is one of the most dangerous places in the world for aid workers, Hargeisa has been relatively stable and consequently many United Nations staff were stationed there.""

Medical staff in Bosaso said October 30 that two more soldiers wounded in the intelligence headquarters blasts died overnight, bringing to at least five the victims of that strike."

== Investigation ==
=== Arrests ===
Authorities in the Puntland said they had arrested a prominent local sheik, Mohamud Ismail, for this attack and several others in a recent wave of attacks. A relative of the sheik, Abdishakur Mire, said: "Soldiers attacked our house and opened fire on us. They injured my uncle in the arm and then took him away." Authorities declined to give further details. However, the Interior Minister, Abdillahi Ismail, said the blasts were planned from Mogadishu.

Ismail was eventually released on November 10.

=== Possible U.S. link ===
Authorities in Minneapolis, Minnesota, were investigating whether Shirwa Ahmed, a Somali immigrant and Minneapolis resident, was one of the suicide bombers in the attack.

== Reactions ==
The presidents of Somaliland and the Puntland state of Somalia condemned the bombings. Dahir Rayale Kahin, president of Somaliland, claimed that the attacks were an attack on Somaliland's "nationhood", and rare in the relatively peaceful breakaway state. He also stated that everything would be done to find out who was responsible for the attacks.

== Responsible faction ==
While no groups have taken responsibility for the attacks, an Islamist insurgency group, Al-Shabaab, is believed to be responsible. Suspicion fell, by at large, on Islamist insurgents in general who were fighting the Somali government and its Ethiopian military allies. Al-Shabaab posted a video of a suicide bomber on the Internet but did not explicitly link this to the attacks. The United States, however, blamed al-Qaeda, which it says works through Shabaab, for the attacks which overshadowed a summit in Kenya to discuss the 17-year-long conflict in Somalia.

== See also ==
- List of terrorist incidents in 2008
- February 2008 Bosaso bombings
- Somalia War (2006–2009)
