= Nadar Tabaax Maalin =

Somalia politician

- Title: Mayor of Beledweyne
- Term: 30 July 2020 - 03 March 2024
- Predecessor: Safiya Hassan Sheikh Ali Jimale
- Successor: Abdullahi Salad Kugey

Nadar Tabaax Maalin (English: Nadar Tabah Malin) is a Somalia politician who served as the mayor of Beledweyne from 30 July 2020 to 3 March 2024.

== Biography ==
Nadar was born in Mogadishu. In Somali history, she is the second woman to have been appointed as a mayor. During her term in office, floods hit Beledweyne district, displacing many. As mayor, Nadar provided notable aid to those affected. After working for three years and seven months, she was fired by Mohamed Abdi Dahir Karore, the Minister of the internal Ministry of Hirshabelle State.
