= March 2022 Somalia attacks =

Jihadist murders in Somalia

- Part of the Somali Civil War
- Attack locations
- Location: Beledweyne and Aden Adde International Airport, Somalia
- Date: March 23, 2022 (EAT (UTC+03:00))
- Target: Amina Mohamed Abdi, Government of Somalia
- Attack type: Mass murder, Assassination, Suicide bombing, Car bomb
- Weapons: Car bombs, explosive belts, Automatic weapons
- Deaths: 60+
- Injuries: 108+
- Perpetrator: Al-Shabaab

On 23 March 2022 in Somalia, a series of coordinated attacks by al-Shabaab jihadists in the two cities of Mogadishu and Beledweyne killed over 60 people.

== Background ==
Al-Shabaab are a Somali Islamist group whose insurgency began during the late 2000s. Their attacks have included many in the country's capital Mogadishu, including the deadliest bombing in African history, in October 2017. They have also often attacked Beledweyne, including suicide attacks in June 2009, October and November 2013 and February 2022.

On the week of the attack, elections in Somalia were scheduled to be held for the Federal Parliament of Somalia, ahead of the 2022 Somali presidential election. This bombing targeted candidates and polling places.

== Attacks ==
=== Aden Adde International Airport shooting ===
On 23 March, gunmen attacked the eastern area of the Aden Adde International Airport, killing five people, including an AMISOM soldier. Two attackers also were killed. Black smoke was seen rising out of the ground near the runway.

=== Beledweyne bombings ===
The next attack occurred a few hours later, as Somali female Member of Parliament Amina Mohamed Abdi left a polling place in Beledweyne. A suicide bomber ran up to Abdi and kissed her before detonating his explosive vest, killing several people. Abdi died instantly along with several bodyguards.

The injured were rushed to the Beledweyne Hospital, where terrorists set off a car bomb, killing at least 30 people. The blast's impact was powerful, with the explosions destroying not only the hospital, but also nearby buildings and cars.

Authorities estimated that at least 48 people were killed by the bombings and 108 others injured.

=== Beledweyne restaurant attack ===
Al-Shabaab militants attacked a restaurant in Beledweyne, killing the retired politician Hassan Dhuhul and many others.

== Aftermath ==
Al-Shabaab claimed responsibility for the attacks. Somali Prime Minister Mohamed Hussein Roble and Somali President Mohamed Abdullahi Mohamed both condemned the attacks. Ali Abdullahi Hussein said that the attacks were the worst such incidents in Beledweyne's history. The Lusa News Agency reported that former Education Minister Abdirahman Dahir Osman was among the injured in the attacks, but did not specify which one he was injured in.

The Jordanian Ministry of Foreign Affairs and Expatriates condemned the airport attack on 24 March, expressing condolences to the families of the victims. The Turkish Ministry of Foreign Affairs also denounced the attacks.

== See also ==
- Mogadishu bombing
