= Muktar Hussein Afrah =

Somalian officer

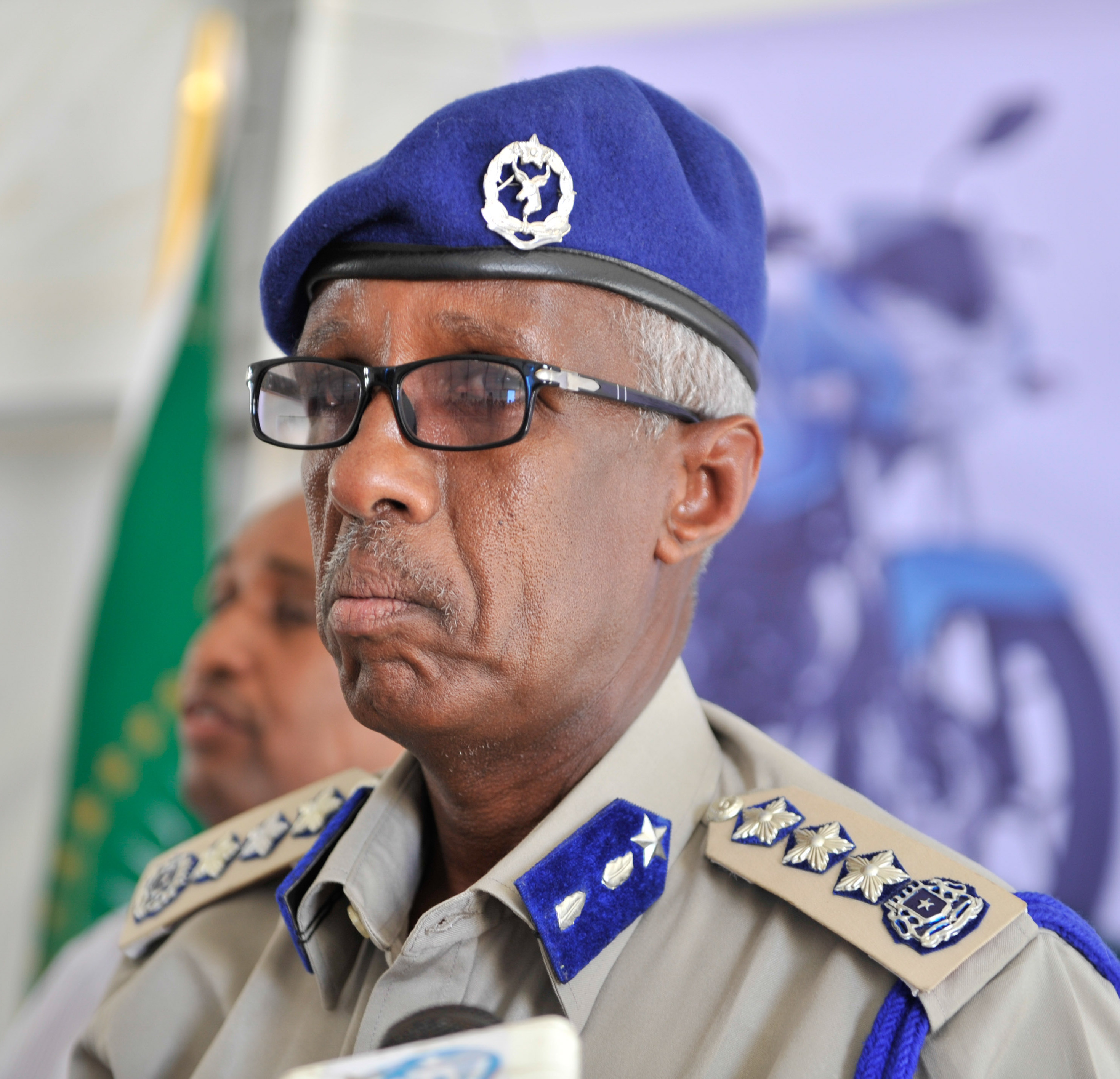
- Allegiance: Somalia
- Branch: Somali National Army
- Rank: General
- Conflicts: Somalia War: Battle of Beledweyne

General Muktar Hussein Afrah (Somali: Mukhtaar Xuseen Afrax) is an officer in the army of the Transitional Federal Government of Somalia. He was commander of forces in Beledweyne after the Battle of Beledweyne. On January 7, 2007 he was arrested by Ethiopian troops for releasing Islamic Court Union (ICU) leader Sheik Farah Moalim Mohammed, based on the written authority of local elders, setting off controversy and violent protests. Ethiopian troops demanded the ICU leader be turned over to them. He was then released and led the TFG forces against Shabaab in 2009 (see article "Battle for Central Somalia"). He was again imprisoned. He was released on January 10, 2010.
