= Baure =

Baure may refer to:

- Baure language, an Arawakan language
- Baure, Nigeria, a Local Government Area in Katsina State
- Battle of Baure, Kenya, 2015
