= February 2022 Beledweyne bombing =

2022 suicide attack at restaurant in Somalia

- Location: Beledweyne, Somalia
- Date: 19 February 2022
- Target: civilians
- Attack type: suicide bombing
- Deaths: 15 (including the perpetrator)
- Injuries: 12+

On 19 February, 2022, an al-Shabaab suicide bomber killed 14 people at a restaurant in Beledweyne, Somalia.

== Background ==
The Islamist militant group al-Shabaab – the Somali branch of al-Qaeda – began their insurgency during the 2006–2009 phase of the Somali Civil War.They took part in battles in Beledweyne, Hiran, Hirshabelle State in 2008, 2010 and 2011. In 2009, they carried out a suicide car bombing at a hotel there, killing 57 people. In 2013, they carried out suicide attacks there at a restaurant and a police station.

== Bombing ==
During the morning of 19 February, 2022, a suicide bomber detonated a bomb in a restaurant in Beledweyene. It killed 14 people – including a candidate in the same month's election – and injured at least another 12. On the same day, al-Shabaab claimed responsibility for the attack.

== Aftermath ==
On 23 March 2022, two more suicide bombings killed over 30 people. The first one killed Amina Mohamed Abdi and many of her bodyguards, while the second was a car bombing against a hospital in Beledweyne.

== See also ==
- Mogadishu bombing
