= Mohamed Hassan Nuriye =

Somali politician

Mayor of Beledweyne
- In office May 7, 2012 – May 28, 2019
- Succeeded by: Safiya Jimale

Mohamed Hassan Nuriye (Somali: Maxamed Xasan Nuuriye, Arabic: محمد حسن نورية) is a Somali politician. He is the former mayor of Beledweyne, serving from 2012 to 2019, when he was succeeded by Safiya Hassan Sheikh Ali Jimale, the first female mayor in Somalia.

== Overview ==
On May 7, 2012, Nuriye was appointed mayor in the central Somalia town of Beledweyne's first municipal elections since the start of the civil war in the early 1990s. 200 delegates took part in the contest, which was overseen by the Hiran region's head of elections, Sadaq Omar Sabriye. Nuriye obtained 135 votes versus 11 and 8 votes, respectively, for the two nearest competitors.

In his first day in office, Mayor Nuriye officially banned firearms within the city limits. He also warned that people found contravening the edict would have their weapons impounded and could face imprisonment. In addition, Nuriye indicated that for security reasons, government soldiers who were not on patrol should remain within their bases. Soldiers would likewise only be permitted to carry weapons in the city while conducting security operations.

To further tighten up on security, the Beledweyne Municipality over a three-day period started simultaneously registering all local residents.

Mayor Nuriye also unveiled plans for a city-wide beautification campaign. On July 18, 2012, his administration imposed a two-day night-time curfew in Beledweyne, while government soldiers demolished structures that had been illegally erected along the area's main road in one of the Municipality's first urban renewal initiatives.
