= Daniel Maldonado =

Daniel Maldonado (born c.1979), also known as his adopted Muslim name Daniel Aljughaifi, is a U.S. citizen who in February 2007 became the first to face charges in federal court for training with Al-Shabaab, a terrorist organization in Somalia.

Maldonado, of Puerto Rican origins, was born in Pelham, New Hampshire. After dropping out of high school before his junior year, in 2000 he converted to fundamentalist Islam and adopted the Arab surname of Aljughaifi. By 2005 he had married and was living in Houston, Texas with his wife and children; they moved that year to Cairo, Egypt. The following year, they went to Somalia, where he joined Al-Shabaab with another American Muslim, Omar Hammami. The group is classified by United States law enforcement as a terrorist organization.

After being captured by Kenyan forces in January 2007, Maldonado was turned over to United States officials and brought back to the US by agents of the Federal Bureau of Investigation (FBI). He was charged in a US District Court in February 2007 in Houston, Texas for receiving military training from a terrorist organization. In April 2007, Maldonado pleaded guilty to the charges. On July 20, 2007, he was sentenced to ten years in prison, with an additional three years of supervised release and a $1000 fine.

== Early life and education ==
Maldonado was born in Pelham, New Hampshire, to Jose and Rena Maldonado. He has an older brother Scott and sister Tamra, and younger brother Joshua. In 1995 as a freshman in high school, he was the only one to wear dreadlocks; friends said he liked attention in the suburban town. While remembered by teachers as bright and outspoken, he dropped out of high school before his junior year. Maldonado lived in other places in New Hampshire and Massachusetts, including Methuen. The Boston Globe reported that, as a youth, Maldonado had minor brushes with the law, but nothing serious.

== Marriage and family ==
Maldonado started dating Tamekia Cunningham in high school. She dropped out of school and worked retail jobs, but got her GED. About a year after their son was born, they married and continued to live with his parents. Her mother Yolanda Cunningham lived in nearby Salem, New Hampshire.

Tamekia also converted from Christianity to Islam and took to wearing full-length burqas. Her mother said Tamekia wanted to share her husband's religion. They moved around New Hampshire and Massachusetts, where Maldonado had difficulty keeping work. Tamekia started a store for some Islamic goods.

By 2005 the couple were living with their two children in Houston, Texas, where Maldonado worked for a computer company. In November 2005, Maldonado moved with his family from Houston to Cairo, Egypt, at the request of his boss, who thought costs would be lower there. His father said that Maldonado and his wife were seeking a more congenial community for Muslims. They had a total of three children together, the youngest likely born in the summer of 2006 while they were living in Egypt.

There Maldonado met Omar Hammami, another American convert to Islam, through an online forum.

== Attraction to Somalia ==
In November 2006, the two men decided to go to Somalia where there was a struggle to set up an Islamic society by insurgents. According to statements that Maldonado gave to the FBI, he hoped to find an Islamic society, as he said he had not felt at home in Egypt. Maldonado took his family with him, installing his wife and children in the capital of Mogadishu. The United States supported the government, not the Islamic insurgents.

Maldonado went on with Hammami to an Al-Shabaab training camp in southern Somalia, in Kismayo, where he contracted malaria. The Boston Globe reports that an FBI affidavit asserts Maldonado took training in Somalia in bomb-making and military skills, taught by Al Qaeda experts, among others.

The family left Somalia with others, with the men and women traveling separately. His wife Tamekia was with their daughters and was described as dying after a high fever, likely due to malaria, shortly before the group reached Kenya in January 2007. She was buried immediately along the way.

On January 21, 2007, Maldonado was captured by Kenyan military authorities as he went over the border from Somalia, seeking to escape invasion by Ethiopian and other forces. By that time, he had his daughters with him, and the three children were with him briefly in jail. His multi-national interrogators included a police terrorist investigator from Houston. Kenya expelled Maldonado, turning him over to US officials. Special Agents of the FBI took custody and escorted him back to the United States, where he was kept in federal custody.

US officials returned his three children to the care of their grandparents in New Hampshire. Maldonado's parents, now living in Londonderry, New Hampshire, have custody and Yolanda Cunningham sees the children frequently.

In mid-February 2007 the United States federal government charged the 28-year-old Maldonado in Houston with getting military training from a terrorist organization in Somalia, including weapons, bomb-making and interrogation techniques. Maldonado is notable because his charge in a Houston, Texas federal court was the first time a US citizen has faced charges for participating in terrorism in Somalia.

The FBI Director Robert S. Mueller III delivered a speech on March 28, 2007 at the National Defense University, in which he referred to Maldonado's fighting in Somalia and arrest:

... such as the arrest of suspected terrorist Daniel Maldonado. Maldonado, an American citizen who converted to the Muslim faith, moved from Houston to Egypt in November 2005. He then traveled to Somalia to practice what he called 'true Islam'. According to the indictment, while in Mogadishu, Maldonado participated in a jihadist training program that included weapons and explosives. He said that he was willing to fight on behalf of Al Qaeda and even offered to act as a suicide bomber. Kenyan military authorities captured Maldonado in January. Members of the Houston Joint Terrorism Task Force transported him back to the United States.

Rodwan Saleh, president of the Islamic Society of Greater Houston, said "the enthusiasm of recent converts can be exploited by some extreme groups." He had not known Maldonado, but said that perhaps he had been attracted to the dark side of Islam.

The case moved rapidly in the court. In April 2007, Maldonado pleaded guilty to receiving military training from Al-Shabaab. His conviction was due to work by the Joint Terrorism Task Force, with members from the FBI and the Houston Police Department. On July 20, 2007, the judge sentenced him to the statutory maximum of ten years in prison for the crime, with an additional three years of supervised release, and a $1000 fine.

== See also ==
- Omar Hammami
- Al-Shabaab
