= Battle of Beledweyne (2006) =

Battle in Somalia

the Islamist revolution in the gc
- Part of the War in Somalia (2006–2009)
- Battle of Beledweyne, December 24–25, 2006
| Date | December 24–25, 2006 |
| Location | Beledweyne, Somalia |
| Result | Somali/Ethiopian victory |

Belligerents
| Ethiopia; Somalia warlords | Islamic Courts Union |

Casualties and losses
| 12 taken prisoner | 60 killed |

The Battle of Beledweyne occurred on December 24 to December 25, 2006, when Ethiopian troops seized that Somalia town from Islamic Courts Union fighters, according to some news agencies. Beledweyne is 100 km north of Baidoa, the seat of Transitional Federal Government of Somalia.

== Prelude to the battle ==
Even before the 2006 events in the Somali Civil War, Beledweyne had seen its share of fighting. In June 2005, fighting between the Galje'el and Jijele subclans Gugundhabe in the western of town lasted for five days, resulting in 16 dead GalJe'el 13 dead and Jijele 3 dead, 70 wounded both clans and hundreds more displaced. This left the town on an uneasy footing.

On June 30, 2006, the ICU held demonstrations in Beledweyne in which protesters held signs reading, "We Don't Want Ethiopia to Enter Somalia."

On August 1, 2006, the ICU sent technicals out towards the Ethiopian border north of Beledweyne. Ethiopian troops were reportedly sent across the border to stop the ICU's advance.

Between August 9 and August 16, ICU militia under the command of Yusuf Makaraan occupied the town. After resisting for a few days, by August 13 the deposed governor, Yusuf Ahmed Hagar (also known as Yusuf Mohamud Hagar and "Dabageed"), fled to Ethiopia to regroup his forces. By August 16, the ICU declared control of the town after a final brief exchange of gunfire.

In late August, 2006, Sheik Farah Moalim established an Islamic court in the town. In an interview with the Associated Press he declared, "The world better learn who we are... This is just the beginning stage."

In September the ICU arrested journalist Osman Adan Areys of Radio Simba for two days for airing a report about the strict new rules and a curfew imposed on the town.

On October 13, Sheikh Abdullahi Gurre, spokesman for the ICU, declared Ethiopian troops had crossed the border and were within 25 km of Beledweyne.

Somalia was devastated by massive floods that hit the country late in 2006. The storms of November 10–11 resulted in the displacement of 60,000 persons in the Beledweyne area. On Sunday, November 26, 200 women protested they had not been getting enough help to deal with the humanitarian crisis.

On December 8, protests here held in Beledweyne to oppose the new UN Resolutions for an IGAD-led peacekeeping mission, dubbed IGASOM.

== Course of the battle ==
Residents said that Ethiopian troops took control of Baladwayne town on December 25 after a day of bombing to uproot the Islamists.

Yusuf Dabageed, the returning Somali governor of Hiran, said, "We have taken control of Baladweyne and our forces are chasing the terrorists. We have killed more than 60 Islamists, wounded others and captured some as prisoners of war." Following their defeat in Baladweyne, leaders of the Islamic courts called on the Ethiopian troops to withdraw.

The ICU allegedly retreated also from the town of Bulo-Barde.

Unconfirmed reports that "hundreds of Ethiopian tanks" were moving along the road towards Jowhar. This presented a major flanking of ICU positions in Tiyoglow and Buurhakaba by striking towards the Shabeellaha Dhexe area. The Ethiopian forces were accompanied by Somali warlord Mohamed Omar Habeb 'Mohamed Dhere,' who wished to reestablish his control over Jowhar.

== Aftermath ==
After the battle, Yusuf Dabageed proclaimed the town of Bedelweyn was liberated and it was again legal to chew khat. A truck filled with khat arriving the next day, on December 26, was met with a burst of cheers.

On December 31, 2006, in an effort to head off additional bloodshed, Yusuf Ahmed Hagar "Dabageed," returning governor of Hiran, called for an end of three days of reprisals conducted by men loyal to him and the TFG. He urged an end to the hunting for former members of the Islamist militias offered assurances that those who were now mingled with the rest of the population would not be hurt or killed.

On January 1, 2007, Somali President Abdullahi Yusuf Ahmed declared a new administrator for Hiiran region, replacing Dabageed. Hussein Mohamud Moalim was named as new administrator, and Saleyman Ahmed Hilawle was nominated as assistant administrator.

On January 5, 2007, Sheikh Farah Moallim Mohamud became the highest-ranking member of the Islamic Courts Union (ICU) to be captured by the Ethiopian-Somali forces. He was apprehended near Beledweyne then later released because of the general amnesty offered to Islamists who surrendered to the government. Clashes broke out between Somali protesters and Ethiopian soldiers after a TFG military officer, Col. Muktar Hussein Afrah, was arrested for refusing to hand over the Sheikh to Ethiopian forces. Three people were reportedly injured. He was released on January 10.
