= October 2022 Beledweyne bombings =

Bombing in Somalia

On 3 October 2022 in Beledweyne, Somalia, al-Shabaab used three car bombs to kill at least 20 people.

At Lama-Galaay military base in Beledweyne, a city in Hiran, central Somalia, two car bombs were detonated at around 10:30 am. During the afternoon, another car bomb exploded during its journey to the base. The attacks killed twenty people, including the health minister of Hirshabelle Zakariye Hurre and Hiran's deputy governor for finance and security, Abukar Madey. The bombings also injured 36 others.

Jihadist group al-Shabaab claimed responsibility for the bombings.

== See also ==
- Beledweyne bombing
- Timeline of al-Shabaab-related events
