= Abu Mansoor Al-Amriki =

American member of al-Shabaab (1984–2013)

Abu Mansoor al-Amriki
- Born: Omar Shafik Hammami; 6 May 1984; Daphne, Alabama, United States
- Died: 12 September 2013 (aged 29); Dinsoor, Somalia
- Military career
- Allegiance: al-Shabaab (2006–2013)
- Nickname: Abu Mansour
- Conflicts: Somali civil war: Somalia War (2006–2009); Somali Civil War (2009–present) †

Omar Shafik Hammami (Arabic: عمر شفيق همّامي, Umar Shafīq Hammāmī; 6 May 1984 – 12 September 2013), also known by the pseudonym Abu Mansoor al-Amriki (Arabic: أبو منصور الأمريكي, Abū Manṣūr al-Amrīkī), was an American citizen who was a member and leader in the Somali Islamist militant group al-Shabaab. A federal warrant for his arrest was issued in 2007. In November 2012, the FBI added Hammami to its Most Wanted Terrorists list.

Omar was raised in a Christian household with an American Protestant mother and a Syrian-born Muslim father. Hammami began to identify as Muslim in high school, after traveling to Syria and meeting his Muslim relatives, and proceeded to drop out of college. After moving to Toronto, Ontario, Canada, and marrying a Somali-Canadian woman in 2004, he traveled with her to Egypt in 2005. He then abandoned his wife and infant daughter to join Al-Shabaab in Somalia in late 2006. They divorced, and by 2009 he had married a Somali woman and had another daughter.

Hammami served as a commander, propagandist, and recruiter. He was rumored to have been killed in March and July 2011 but later appeared again in videos. In December 2012, he defected from Al-Shabaab due to what he referred to as differences in "Shariah and strategy." Al-Shabaab posted a rebuke online of what it called his "narcissistic pursuit of fame."

Hammami was killed by al-Shabaab militants on 12 September 2013.

== Early life ==
Hammami was born to Shafik Hammami and Debra Hadley and grew up in Daphne, Alabama, with an older sister Dena. Hammami's father, Shafik, a Syrian Muslim, grew up in Damascus, Syria and moved to Alabama for college, later becoming a civil engineer. His mother, Hadley, is of Irish descent and was a former schoolteacher. The children were initially raised as Southern Baptist but also practiced Muslim culture at home. Finding her father too restrictive, Dena left the home at 16 and went to live with friends.

Hammami was president of his sophomore class at Daphne High School and was in the Advanced Placement program. Following his father's return to Islam, Hammami began to explore the religion. He grew flamboyant about his faith in high school, convincing his friend Bernie Culveyhouse to convert to Islam. He left high school early to start college. Friends in school thought of him as a leader.

Over time, Hammami grew increasingly religious. While in college, he became influenced by Tony Salvatore Sylvester, an American convert to Islam at the Masjid in Mobile, Alabama and Hamammi became a Salafi. He served as president of the Muslim Students' Association at the University of South Alabama. His theological stance caused him conflict with his father, who asked him to leave home in 2002. Hammami also dropped out of college.

== Marriage and family ==
Hammami and Culveyhouse worked odd jobs. Together, they decided to move to Toronto, Ontario, Canada, which had a large Muslim community. Soon, Culveyhouse married. Hammami became more aware of the US Invasion of Iraq and began to become interested in jihad as he followed the fighting in Chechnya. In March 2005, Hammami married 19-year-old Sadiyo Mohamed Abdille, a woman from Somalia whose family had fled in 2001 for Canada from the civil war which had been going on since 1991.

In June 2005, the two friends moved with their families to Alexandria, Egypt and the Hammamis' daughter was born there. The men wanted to study at Al-Azhar University but neither was accepted, and Culveyhouse decided to return to the United States with his family.

== Joining al-Shabaab in Somalia ==
Through an Internet forum, Hammami met Daniel Maldonado, an American convert to Islam who was living in Cairo with his wife and two children. The two young men secretly made plans to leave for Somalia. At the age of 22, Hammami traveled to Somalia in November 2006 and apparently joined al-Shabaab soon after, as Mogadishu descended into war. He told his family he lost his passport, and his parents contacted federal officials to help him but were told the US did not have diplomatic relations with Somalia. He disappeared, and his wife took their daughter with her back to Toronto. She refused his request to join him in Somalia and, in 2007, got a divorce.

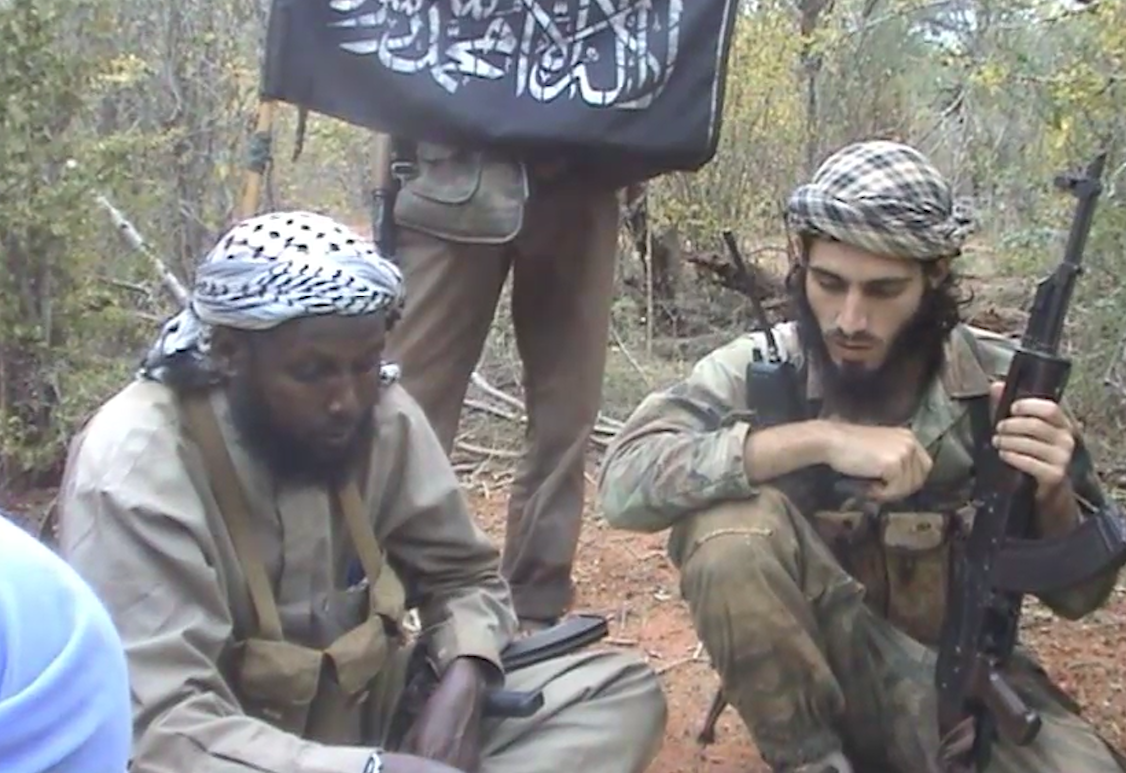
Mukthar Robow and Abu Mansoor Ali Amriki planning to ambush an ENDF convoy during the Ethiopian military occupation of Somalia (15 July 2008)

In October 2007, Hammami appeared publicly identified as "Abu Mansoor Al-Amriki" (the American) for the first time, giving an interview for Al Jazeera. Fluent in Arabic, with computer and organization skills, Hammami was noticed by his superiors. In a January 2008 letter, Al-Amriki explained al-Shabaab's goal to establish an Islamic caliphate "from East to West after removing the occupier and killing the apostates."

Hammami became a major leader in Al-Shabaab, "commanding guerrilla forces in the field, organizing attacks and plotting strategy with al Qaeda operatives, according to The New York Times. He was said to have directed an October 2008 operation in which Shirwa Ahmed, a Somali-American, blew himself up, the second known American suicide bomber." In 2010 United States officials said they knew of no other American citizen who had risen so high as Hammami in Al-Shabaab, although it had recruited nearly 20 Americans, many from the Minneapolis area.

For these activities, in 2007, Hammami was indicted in the Southern District of Alabama on terrorism violations. A superseding indictment was returned against Hammami in 2009 on terrorism violations for leaving the United States to join al-Shabaab, a terrorist organization. On 13 December 2007, a federal warrant for his arrest was issued by the United States District Court, Southern District of Alabama.

Al-Amriki revealed his face in a 31-minute video released 31 March 2009, and in recruitment footage posted to a Somali terrorist website on 5 April 2009. He said,

The only reason we are staying here, away from our families, away from the cities, away from candy bars [and] ice, all these other things is because we are waiting to meet with the enemy. ... If you can encourage more of your children, and more of your neighbors, and anyone around you to send people ... to this Jihad, it would be a great asset for us.

In the video, al-Amriki talks about preparations for an ambush and his attempt to "try to blow up as many of their vehicles as we can and kill as many of them as we can." After the ambush, al-Amriki praises a killed fighter. American law enforcement authorities have claimed that Somali-Americans from Minnesota also appear in the 31 March video. One of the Americans featured in the video is Shirwa Ahmed, known to have been among four people to die in suicide attacks in October 2008 against the United Nations compound, the Ethiopian Consulate and the presidential palace in Hargeisa. The two videos indicated that Al-Amriki had become a prominent figure for al-Shabaab in its effort to recruit Western Muslims to jihad. His family and friends remain shocked that he could have embraced this cause.

On 8 July 2009, al-Amriki released an audiotape on jihadi websites. Billed as a "response" to U.S. President Barack Obama's June 2009 Cairo speech to "the Muslim world," the audio message warned Muslims against being taken in by Obama's "charisma." In the message, al-Amriki affirmed al-Shabaab's allegiance to Al Qaeda and condoned the 9/11 terror attacks in the United States.

In September 2009 Hammami contacted his sister Dena by email, saying that he had married a Somali woman and had a baby daughter. He contacted his sister intermittently. She disapproved of what he was doing but did not want to lose touch altogether.

In January 2010 he uploaded a lengthy autobiography available on JIHADOLOGY.net entitled "The Story of an American Jihadi: Part One." The 127-page document deals with his evolution from Muslim convert to Salafi to jihadi; enlisting in the Shabaab, life in combat fighting off hungry lions and giant ants at night. While defiant in his opposition to American government, Hammami expressed a wish to have "a three-day visit to see my mom, dad and sister."

In April 2011, Hammami released two rap songs dealing with jihad. One song, called Send me a Cruise, praised martyrdom at the hands of US forces. The other song, Make Jihad With Me, was aimed at recruiting Islamic youth to join the al Shabaab movement.

=== False reports of death ===
In March 2011, Somalian government sources reported that Hammami had been killed during fighting in Mogadishu. Somali Defence Minister Abdihakim Mohamoud Haji-Faqi subsequently told the Associated Press that Somali officials did not have a body and that the intelligence reports had not yet been confirmed.

Long War Journal reported on 15 March that Hammami had not been killed as Somali officials had claimed, as he had released a videotape. As Al-Amriki, Hammami had released an Anasheed song, mocking the claims of his death.

In July 2011, the Sunatimes reported that Hammami had possibly been killed in a Predator drone attack in Jubba, Somalia. He was featured in a March 2012 video claiming that his life may be in danger from Al-Shabaab, arising from a dispute over interpretations of Sharia law.

Al Shabaab denied this, saying that it was surprised by the video and that Al-Amriki "still enjoys all the privileges of brotherhood." The group added that it was attempting to verify "the authenticity as well as the motivations behind the video" and that a formal investigation was underway. On 25 May Hammami posted an audio lecture online. In the 45-minute lecture, originally posted in January but removed, he criticized jihadist organizations with a local focus, likening them to a "cancerous tumor." He also called for all Muslims to unite in a "jihad of the entire 'Ummah'" under the banner of restored caliphate.

In November 2012, the FBI placed Hammami on its Most Wanted Terrorists list.

On 17 December 2012, Al-Shabaab posted a message on Twitter publicly chastising Hammami for releasing videos in a "narcissistic pursuit of fame." The tweet asserted that the group had tried to talk with him privately but in vain. Al-Shabaab claimed a moral obligation to reveal Hammami's "obstinacy".

On 9 May 2013, senior member of al Shabaab and militant Fuad Mohamed Shangole claimed that Abu Mansoor al Amriki had been killed by armed men loyal to the top al Shabaab leader Ahmed Godane in Rama-cadey area. Preaching at a mosque in Bula-Barde town of Hiran region in central Somalia, Shangole said that Abu Mansoor al Amriki was killed after men he dubbed to be "apostates" ambushed him. Shangole said after Omar Hamami was killed, a fight between extremist militias erupted where a number of al Shabaab fighters were killed.

However, the reports of al-Amriki's death were proven wrong when he was interviewed by Voice of America on 3 September 2013.

== Death ==
Omar Hammami was killed on 12 September 2013, in an early-morning ambush by al-Shabaab militants in a village near the town of Dinsoor, south-west of the capital, Mogadishu. US administration officials in the embassy of Nairobi, Kenya investigated the validity of the reports of his death.

Hammami's death was eventually confirmed when the FBI removed him from their Most Wanted Terrorists list in November 2013. He was removed from the U.S. State Department's Rewards for Justice list in January 2014.
