= Omar Hashi Aden =

Somali politician

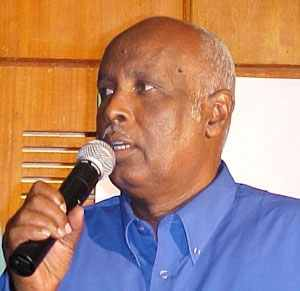
- Died: 18 June 2009
- Occupation: Politician
- Known for: Former member of parliament under the rule of Siad Barre

Omar Hashi Aden (Somali: Cumar Xaashi Aaden, Arabic: عمر هاشي آدم) (died 18 June 2009) was a politician from the Hiiraan region of Somalia, and he was a member of parliament under the rule of Siad Barre; he was forced to flee to Eritrea during the Somali Civil War. He was a member of the Transitional Federal Government of Somalia, eventually rising to Security Minister.

Before the Ethiopian invasion of Somalia, he had been a former member of parliament in exile in Eritrea. Under President Sharif Sheikh Ahmed, Aden was appointed Minister of Security of Somalia, and he took part in the struggle against al-Shabaab and the other Islamist militants. On 18 June 2009, he was killed in the 2009 Beledweyne bombing by a suicide bomber with 34 others. He was assassinated (see 2009 Beledweyne bombing) by a suicide bomber on 18 June 2009 in Beledweyne, in the Hiiraan region in central Somalia. The blast which ripped through a hotel in the town of Beledweyne, near the Ethiopian border, killed minister Omar Hashi Aden and 19 others, including several government officials among his entourage, officials said. Somalia's president Sharif Sheikh Ahmed blamed Al-Shabaab—accused of having links with Al-Qaeda, which later claimed the attack.
