= 2013 Beledweyne attacks =

Al-Shabaab massacres in Somalia

In late 2013, al-Shabaab carried out two major suicide attacks in Beledweyne, Somalia, killing 35 people.

== Background ==
The Islamist group al-Shabaab began their insurgency in the 2000s. Previous actions by al-Shabaab in Beledweyne, Hiran, Hirshabelle State, included a suicide car bombing in 2009 which killed 57 people at a hotel as well as battles in 2010 and 2011.

== October bombing ==
At 11 am on 19 October 2013 in Beledweyne, a suicide bomber wearing an explosive belt detonated it inside a crowded restaurant, killing 16 people. On the same day, al-Shabaab claimed responsibility, saying their main target was Djiboutian and Ethiopian troops who were part of the African Union Mission to Somalia. Some AU soldiers were killed, but most of those killed were civilians.

== November attack ==
At 11am on 19 November 2013 in Beledweyne, a suicide car bomber rammed a police station. Gunmen then stormed the building and shot people inside. At least 19 people were killed. On the same day, al-Shabaab claimed responsibility.

== See also ==
- 2022 Beledweyne bombing
