= Battle of Janale (2015) =

Battle of the Somali Civil War

- Part of the War in Somalia
Date	1 September 2015
Location	Janale, Lower Shebelle, Somalia 1°48′26″N 44°41′43″E

Belligerents
Al-Shabaab	AMISOM Uganda

Commanders and leaders
Abdirasheed Buqudbe, Mohamed Hirey	(Uganda) Unknown

Units involved
Sheikh Abu Zubeyr Battalion	(Uganda) UPDF

Strength
Dozens of	Unknown

Casualties and losses
5 killed (Al-Shabbab claim)	70 killed (Al-Shabbab claim); 50 killed 50 missing (Western officials claim)
- Location within Somalia Battle of Janale (2015) (Africa)

The battle of Janale took place on September 1st 2015, when Al-Shabaab militants stormed an African Union military camp manned by Ugandan forces in the town of Janale, Lower Shabelle.

== Battle ==
It began after an Al Shabaab suicide bomber rammed a vehicle packed with explosives into the perimeter of the base, which exploded at the front of the base. Al Shabaab later named the suicide bomber in a propaganda video as Abdullah Ahmed Omar, a former Somali soldier who defected to Al Shabaab in 2014. Following that, a team of heavily armed fighters entered the breach and attacked the troops inside. The attack was launched to commemorate one anniversary after the group's former leader Ahmed Abdi Godane's death, who was killed in a U.S. drone airstrike in the previous year.
