= Safiya Jimale =

Somali politician

Safiya Hassan Sheikh Ali Jimale

Mayor of Beledweyne
- In office 27 May 2019 – 30 July 2020
- Preceded by: Khadar Hassan Afrah
- Succeeded by: Nadar Tabaax Maalin

Safiya Hassan Sheikh Ali Jimale is a Somali politician. She was the Mayor of Beledweyne from 27 May 2019 to 30 July 2020. Safiya was the country's first female mayor after the Somali Civil War.

Safiya is the granddaughter of Sheikh Ali Jimale, who served as the Minister for Labour and Social Affairs during the trusteeship period as well as the newly independent Somali Republic.
