= Radio Simba =

Kampala; Uganda
- Frequencies: 97.3 MHz (Kampala); 92.1 MHz (Mubende)

Programming
- Language: Luganda

Ownership
- Owner: Africa FM Limited

History
- First air date: 15 June 1998

Links
- Website: www.radiosimba.ug

Radio Simba is a private commercial radio station broadcasting to central Uganda in the Luganda language, with transmitters in Kampala and Mubende.

== History ==
Radio Simba began broadcasting on 15 June 1998, with its first broadcast being the Germany–United States match of the 1998 FIFA World Cup; Simba's match commentaries drew considerable listener attention to the new outlet, as did its style of commentary. The station was founded by Aga Sekalala Jr and Isaac Mulindwa Jr, as well as Gordon Wavamunno. It provided competition primarily to CBS FM Buganda, which had begun broadcasting two years prior.

In 2004, the Uganda Broadcasting Council, the national broadcasting regulator, fined Radio Simba for airing a talk show featuring gay men, with its chair calling the programme "contrary to public morality and ... not in compliance with the existing law".
