= 2008 Battle of Beledweyne =

Battle between Ethiopia and Somali terrorists

Battle of Beledweyne (2008)
- Part of the War in Somalia (2006–2009)
Date	July 1–26, 2008
Location	Beledweyne, Somalia
Result	Al-Shabaab victory

Belligerents
Al-Shabaab	Ethiopia

Casualties and losses
35 killed (media report); 71 killed (Ethiopian claim)	50 killed
- 22 civilians killed

The Battle of Beledweyne took place in July 2008. It began on July 1, when Islamic militants from al-Shabaab attacked Ethiopian soldiers in the town of Beledweyne, Somalia, which was defended by a garrison of Ethiopian troops.

== Background ==
At the beginning of June 2008 Islamist forces started taking whole districts across central parts of Somalia. In the Bay region, northwest of Mogadishu, al-Shabaab insurgents entered the district of Qansah-Dheere on June 7, 2008, and took control without facing any resistance. Residents said there were no government troops present when the insurgents arrived.

On June 23, Islamist forces captured Bardale, entirely encircling Baidoa and cutting off the highway to Dolo. The next day, Islamist forces established control of Bardhere unopposed, signaling a definitive shift of Marehan clan affiliation solidly into the Islamist column. After that, on June 28, 2008, Islamist forces peacefully retook the strategic city of Beledweyne after the Ethiopian garrison withdrew from the area. Some looting of government facilities occurred, but Islamist commanders called on locals to return stolen property and uphold the peace. Some heavy fighting however did occur at the town of Guguriel, which is where the Ethiopians had withdrawn to after vacating Beledweyne.

== The battle ==
The fighting started July 1, 2008, when Somali opposition fighters ambushed an Ethiopian Army convoy travelling from Guguriel in retreat toward the Ethiopian border. The fighting in the Mataban area left 47 Ethiopian soldiers and 35 Islamist fighters dead. Three Ethiopian military vehicles were destroyed and two captured by the insurgents. Eleven of the dead Ethiopians were senior and junior officers. Ethiopian troops withdrew to Ferfer across the border. As for the civilian casualties of the Mataban battle, it was confirmed that a child was among those killed.

On July 3, Ethiopian troops commenced a counter-attack over the border against the insurgents in an attempt to retake Beledweyne. An Ethiopian column supported by tanks and artillery drove southeast from Ferfer and engaged al-Shabaab forces in Elgal in the mountainous northwestern outskirts of Beledweyn. The Ethiopian force pounded Islamist positions heavily with ballistic missiles. Later in the day the Ethiopian force advanced to Jandkundisho, a suburb of Beledweyne, and continued to pound the hills surrounding Beledweyne, before digging into defensive positions outside Beledweyn.

The battle resumed on July 5, when the Islamist and Ethiopian forces clashed in Bur-Gabo, a village between Ferfer and Beledweyn. Sheikh Abdirahim Isse declared the Islamist forces to be victorious, having destroyed 4 Ethiopian military vehicles and "huge losses" of Ethiopian soldiers.

On July 6, the residents of Beledweyne fled the town as the Ethiopian Army began building up their forces in Jandkundisho, conceivably in preparations for an attack on Beledweyne.

On July 24, Ethiopian troops finally attacked the town. Seven civilians were killed and 12 others were wounded after artillery shells and bullets hit residential areas in Beledweyne as the troops moved in. Another seven civilians were shot dead near a bridge in the town by Ethiopian troops. Two more civilians were killed later in the day by shelling. By late that night most of the city had fallen into Ethiopian hands. However the Islamists were regrouping for a counter-attack. Sixteen civilians were killed by the end of the first day.

The next morning on July 25, fighting was still raging, as Islamist rebels sought to push out Ethiopian troops. At least 12 people were killed, including three civilians who died when an artillery shell hit their home on the western side of Beledweyne. Among the dead were at least three Ethiopian soldiers and four insurgents. This brought the toll in two days of fighting to 28 dead. The street battles finally died down by the end of the day with Ethiopian troops in control of the town.

The subsequent day saw al-Shabaab launch a massed counter-attack against Ethiopian positions in Beledweyne. Utilizing artillery support the UIC succeeded in recapturing a key bridge in the central part of the town. During this renewed fighting much of the Beledweyne civilian population fled from their homes.

== Aftermath ==
After the Ethiopians recaptured the northern part of the city fighting continued for months, with insurgents still in positions outside of the town.

There was a lull in the fighting, after the Ethiopian's victory, for the next three weeks until August 16, when insurgents attacked Ethiopian Army positions in the city which led to fighting that killed four Ethiopian soldiers and nine civilians.

On September 11, renewed fighting in the city killed one more Ethiopian soldier and three civilians.

By the end of November, under an agreement with the Islamists, Ethiopian troops finally withdrew from the city and returned to Ethiopia.
