= February 2008 Bosaso bombings =

2008 Somali bombings

2008 Bosaso bombings
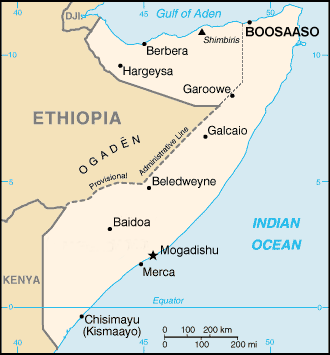
- Location of Bosaso in Somalia
- Location: Bosaso, Somalia
- Date: February 5, 2008
- Target: Ethiopian migrants
- Attack type: Grenades
- Deaths: 25
- Injuries: 80
- Perpetrator: Al-Shabaab

The 2008 Bosaso bombings occurred on February 5, 2008. Explosives, timed to go off together in north-eastern Somalia city of Bosaso, killed at least 20 people and wounded over 100.
