= Shirwa Ahmed =

- Born: c. 1983; Somalia
- Died: October 29, 2008; Puntland, Somalia
- Cause of death: Suicide bombing

Shirwa Ahmed (c. 1983 – October 29, 2008) was a 26-year-old Somali-American who is the first known American Islamist suicide bomber. He detonated a car bomb in Somalia in October 2008, killing himself.

== Life ==
Ahmed immigrated to the United States as a child, resided in Minneapolis, Minnesota and entered the Roosevelt High School in September 1996. He became a naturalized American citizen and went on to attend community college before dropping out and worked odd jobs. In 2004, Ahmed began associating with a new group of friends perceived as having been religious; he was "radicalized in his hometown in Minnesota" according to Robert Mueller, the director of the Federal Bureau of Investigation. He was one of twenty Somali-American men who departed the Minneapolis area for Somalia, a trend which has been the focus of one of the larger domestic terrorism investigations since September 11, 2001. Motivated by a mixture of politics and religion, he joined Al-Shabaab, a militant Somali group. Then, on October 29, 2008, — or the 28th — he drove a car loaded with explosives into a government compound in Puntland in the northern region of the country, and blew himself up. The FBI investigated the incident and returned Ahmed's remains to Minneapolis that November.

Mother Jones magazine pointed out normal elements of his American upbringing, including being a fan of rap artist Ice Cube, and enjoying basketball.
