= Battle of Baure =

Battle in Kenya on 14 June 2015

2015 Battle of Baure
- Part of the War in Somalia
Date	14 June 2015
Location	Baure, Lamu, Kenya
Result	Attack repulsed

Belligerents
al-Qaeda; al-Shabaab	Kenya

Commanders and leaders
Abdul Hakim †; Abu Nusaybah	Christipo Mutali

Casualties and losses
11 killed	2 killed

The Battle of Baure was an Al-Shabaab attack on a Kenyan military base located next to the town of Baure, in Lamu County, Kenya.

== The attack ==
On the morning of 14 June at approximately 5.45am a group of al-Shabaab militants attacked the Kenyan army base. After a short engagement on the perimeter of the base, the attack was repulsed, leaving 11 Al-Shabaab fighters and 2 Kenyan soldiers dead. The Al-Shabaab second-in-command was 25 year old British-born Thomas Evans ("Abdul Hakim"), who filmed the attack with a camera strapped to his body, and Evans died in the fighting. Evans was well integrated into al-Shabaab, having first joined in 2012, he spoke fluent Somali and issued commands and communicated with fellow fighters through radio. German-born Andreas Martin Muller ("Abu Nusaybah") also took part in the attack, and escaped alive but wounded.
