= Amina Mohamed Abdi =

Somali politician (1981–2022)

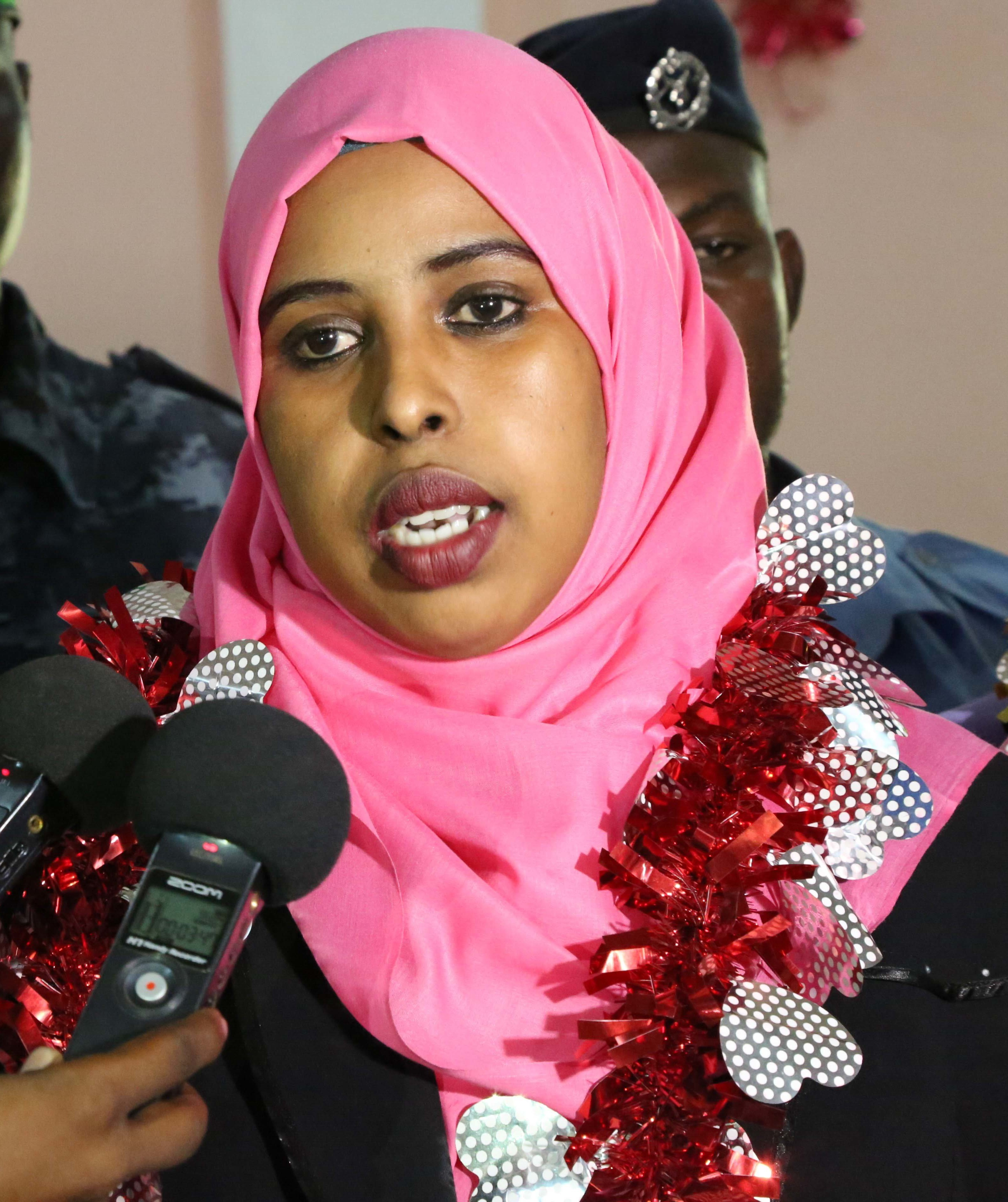

Member of Federal Parliament of Somalia
- In office 1 January 2012 – 23 March 2022
- Preceded by: Abdulaahi

Personal details
- Born: 21 October 1981 Mogadishu, Banaadir Somalia, Somalia
- Died: 23 March 2022 (aged 40) Beledweyne, Somalia
- Party: Union for Peace and Development Party

Amina Mohamed Abdi (Somali: Aamina Maxamed Cabdi; 21 October 1981 – 23 March 2022) was a Somali politician, she was an MP in the Federal Parliament of Somalia from 2012 till her death, as a member of the opposition Union for Peace and Development Party.

== Life ==
Amina Mohamed Abdi was from the Hawiye, gaaljecel clan. She attended school in Mogadishu, and remembered, aged eight, returning from school to find her house empty and her family gone as the Somali Civil War fighting broke out in 1992. She later lived with her uncle, himself a member of the Somali parliament.

In 2012, aged 24, Abdi stood for parliament. Defeating two other candidates, she won a seat reserved for women.

In the 2016 Somali parliamentary election, Abdi won an open parliamentary seat in Hiran, Somalia.

Abdi was preparing to be a candidate in the parliamentary elections scheduled for February 2021, defending her seat against five men. However, the elections were postponed amidst disagreement over the voting process.

She was an advocate for an investigation into the disappearance of Ikran Tahlil Farah.

== Assassination ==
On 23 March 2022, an al-Shabaab suicide bomber targeted a vehicle carrying Amina and her bodyguards in Beledweyne, as she was campaigning for re-election. When the casualties were taken to hospital, a suicide car bomb exploded. Amina was killed during the attack. She was just 40 years old. The attacks also killed 47 more people and injured 105.
