= September 2022 Beledweyne attack =

2022 terrorist attack in Somalia

September 2022 Hiran bombing
- Part of Somali Civil War (2009-present)
- Location: near Beledweyne, Hiran Region, Somalia
- Date: September 3, 2022
- Deaths: 21
- Perpetrator: al-Shabaab

On September 3, 2022, militants from al-Shabaab ambushed a civilian bus traveling from Beledweyne to Mahas, in Hiran, Somalia. Over twenty civilians were killed, and the bombing occurred in the middle of the 2022 Hiraan offensive by the Somali military against al-Shabaab.

== Prelude ==
The city of Beledweyne, in central Somalia's Hiraan region, has been at the forefront of the civil war between the Somali government and the jihadist group al-Shabaab. In July 2022, the Somali government launched an offensive against al-Shabaab-controlled areas in Hiraan region, with the aid of the local Ma'awisley militia. In response, elements of al-Shabaab fled across the Somali border into Ethiopia, sparking a second conflict. Al-Shabaab's counter to the offensive, per their modus operandi, was using IEDs and other bomb attacks against the Somali army and civilians.

== Attack ==
Around midnight on September 3, seven vehicles transporting aid and civilians from Beledweyne to Mahas were traveling along the road when the initial seven vehicles were ambushed by al-Shabaab fighters, shooting into the bus. Two vehicles behind the convoy went to rescue survivors, but were hit by an IED while attempting to reach them. Locals and survivors recounted that many of the dead civilians were shot, and the civilian and food aid buses were burned by the al-Shabaab fighters afterward. The initial ambush killed eighteen civilians, with the subsequent bombing killing three aid workers.

Al-Shabaab claimed responsibility for the attack, claiming to have ambushed a Ma'awisley supply convoy.

== Aftermath and reactions ==
Somali president Hassan Sheikh Mohamud stated that the government "strongly condemns the despicable acts of murder against innocent civilians." Ali Gudlawe, president of Hirshabelle State, expressed his condolences as well.

Twenty-one people were killed in the attack. In response to the attack, a localized offensive in the Hiran region by the Somali government recaptured over twenty villages. The operation killed 100 al-Shabaab fighters, and captured 20 alive, according to the Somali government.
