= 2011 Battle of Beledweyne =

Battle of the Somali Civil War

Battle of Beledweyne
- Part of Somali Civil War, War in Somalia (2009-present)
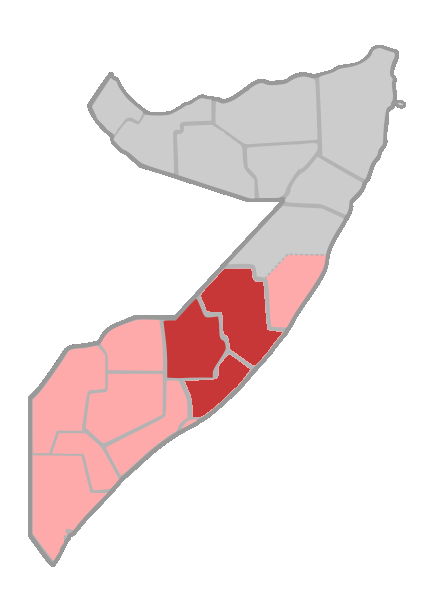
Date	December 2011 – 31 December 2011
Location	Hiraan
Result	Ethiopian-TFG Victory
Territorial changes	Ethiopian forces capture Beledweyne

Belligerents
Al-Shabaab: Foreign Mujahideen	Somalia: Ethiopia

Commanders and leaders
Yusuf Ugas	Ethiopian commanders

Strength
	3,000

Casualties and losses
- 20 from both sides

In December 2011, Ethiopian forces recaptured the central Somali town of Beledweyne from Al-Shabaab fighters.

== The Fighting ==
al-Shabbab claimed to have repelled three Ethiopian attacks and then made a "tactical withdrawal". Ethiopian-TFG forces easily captured the town; however, residents still feared that the al-Shabbab would return and fight for the town. Eyewitnesses claimed both sides used heavy artillery and weapons.
