= Battle of Beledweyne (2010) =

Battle of the Somali Civil War

- Part of Somali Civil War, War in Somalia (2009-present)
Date	January 10, 2010–January 14, 2010; January 22, 2010–January 24, 2010
Location	Beledweyne, Hiiraan, Somalia
Result	Initial Ahlu Sunna success; soon after- Hizbul Islam re-takes the town

Belligerents
Hizbul Islam; Harakat al-Shabaab Mujahideen	Somalia: (Somalia) TFG Ahlu Sunna Waljama'a

Commanders and leaders
Shurie Farah Sabriye	Aden Abdulle Awale; Abdullah al-Qaadi; Dabaged (Somalia) Tawane Hure

Casualties and losses
- 25 dead 75 wounded

The Battle of Beledweyne began on January 10, 2010 when Ahlu Sunna Waljama'a forces attacked and captured East Beledweyne which was being held by the Hizbul Islam insurgent group. It was initially reported that TFG forces took part in the offensive however Ahlu Sunna Waljma'a leaders said the government was not helping them during the offensive. Fighting soon spread from the East to the center of the city. It became the first battle in months were al-Shabaab and Hizbul Islam groups cooperated against the TFG.

== The battle ==
Fighting started on early January 10, 2010, as forces loyal to the TFG-aligned Ahlu Sunnah Waljama'a (which controls large parts of central Somalia) attacked the city of Beledweyne which was held by Islamist Insurgents loyal to Hizbul Islam. The attackers managed to seize control of the Eastern half of the city. The city is divided in two by the Shebelle River. The fighting continued throughout the day as Ahlu Sunnah Waljama'a attacked Hizbul Islam bases and leaders of confirmed the fighting was taking place.

On January 11, 2009 fighting restarted as Hizbul Islam forces attacked Ahlu Wal Sunnah Waljama'a bases. Aden Abdulle Awale, from Ahlu Sunnah Waljama'a claimed his forces had repelled the attack while Hiiraan's Hizbul Islam governor Sheikh Shurie Farah Sabriye claimed his forces had repelled Ahlu Sunnah Waljama'a's attack on their bases on January 10. Locals confirmed that the fighting had spread from East to the Center of the city as Ahlu Sunnah leader Abdulle Awale vowed to capture the entire city and complained the government was not giving them any support. Hizbul Islam forces succeeded in expelling Ahlu Sunnah Waljam'a forces from the Eastern part of the city however fighting continued and Ahlu Sunnah Waljama'a managed to recapture important parts of the Eastern half of the city such as the centre of the region, the police station and most of the neighborhoods of Bari side. Heavy fighting continued in the East side.

On January 12, 2010, fighting moved from the East side more to the center as central districts had been captured by Ahlu Sunnah Waljama'a on the 11th, fighting was reportedly concentrated around Liq-Liqato Bridge which separates the East and the West side of the city. Both sides used the heaviest gunfire so far and Hizbul Islam launched numerous mortars at the Ahlu Sunnah Waljama'a controlled police station. Thousands fled their houses in fear of gunfire. Also this day the first casualty figures came in, independent sources confirming the death of at least 8 people and injury of 10. However, later released casualty figures confirmed that at least 10 people had been killed and 11 injured on 12 January alone. It was also reported that TFG forces led by Tawane Hure joined the battle to support Ahlu Sunnah Waljama'a and forces loyal to Harakat al-Shabaab Mujahedeen (Somalia's most powerful insurgent group), which had been at war with Hizbul Islam since September 2009 joined to back Hizbul Islam fighters for the first time in months. It was also announced by Ahlu Sunnah Waljam'a official Abdullah al-Qaadi that Sheikh Ahmed Madobe, an ex-Hizbul Islam commander whose forces expelled from the Central region during their war with al-Shabaab, joined Ahlu Sunnah Waljama'a with his forces, as they vowed to re-take whole of Somalia from al-Shabaab. Madobe himself however rejected these claims.

On January 13, 2010 the fighting continued for its fourth day and left more than 5 people dead and 10 wounded. Locals said that the fighting was heavily started and continuing at around the neighborhoods between Bundoweyn and Liq-Liqato bridge, several mortar shells also hit the city's business center. Yusuf Ahmed Hagar Dabageed, a military commander of Ahlu Sunnah Waljama'a said his forces had the upper hand in the fighting but soon the situation started to cool down somewhat as Shuriye Farah Sabriye said they would stop the fighting. Locals reported both sides were amassing their reinforcements to restart the battle.

January 14, 2010, fighting continued on the bridge and in neighbourhoods of the East side as the death toll rose to at least 25 with over 60 injured which caused the largest displacement for Beledweyn thus far. However, by the end of the day an unreliable calm returned to the city, people used the calm to flee to rural areas of the city. On January 15, Hawiyeh Clan elders called on both sides to stop the fighting due to the increasing civilian casualties and damage to civilian property.

== Aftermath ==
January 22, 2010, the troops both sides had been amassing in preparation for a second round finally clashed, resulting in a Hizbul Islam victory as they managed to re-take all of the town and the region around it. Ahlu Sunnah militia retreated to the village of El Gal, al-Shabaab militia were said to have also participated in the offensive. Hizbul Islam leaders then said they would help the displaced people return to the city.

On January 24, 2010, the insurgents launched an assault on the villages El Gal and Owmad, where Ahlu Sunnah militia had retreated and were preparing for a new offensive. Heavy clashes broke out in the villages were after insurgents seized control there pushing Ahlu Sunnah back even further from the city.
