= 2009 Beledweyne bombing =

Bombing in Beledweyne, Hiiraan, Somalia

Coordinates: 4°44′N 45°12′E

- Part of the Somali Civil War
- The Hiiraan region of Somalia, where the attacks occurred (highlighted dark red)
- Location: Beledweyne, Hiiraan, Somalia
- Date: June 18, 2009
- Target: Medina Hotel
- Attack type: Suicide car bomb
- Weapon: Car bomb
- Deaths: 57
- Injuries: 307
- Perpetrator: Al-Shabaab

The Beledweyne bombing was a bombing targeting Medina Hotel in Beledweyne, Somalia killing 57 and injuring 307 others.

== The attack ==
On June 18, 2009, at around 10:30 am local time, an explosive-ladened Toyota car began to drive to the Medina Hotel. The car bomb was spotted before it reached the entrance of Medina Hotel, Omar Hashi Aden the National Security Minister of Somalia were about to leave the hotel when the car bomb drove through the entrance on the hotel crashing into parked cars before detonating its explosive device. The explosion severely damaged the hotel, killed 57 people, and left 307 injured.

== Victims ==
Several influential people were also killed in the car bombing, including Ambassadors, ministers, military colonels, and clan elders.

Some Influential people killed include:

- Omar Hashi Aden- Minister of Security of Somalia
- Abdikarim Farah Laqanyo- former Somali ambassador to Ethiopia and the African Union
- Mohamed Abdi Yarow- Colonel in the Somali Armed Forces
- Mohamed Barre Fidow- Colonel in the Somali Armed Forces
- Omar Hasan Dhudi- Colonel in the Somali Armed Forces
- Yusuf Husen- Colonel in the Somali Armed Forces
