= Beledweyne =

Capital city of the Hiran region in Somalia

Beledweyne Beled Weyne
- City
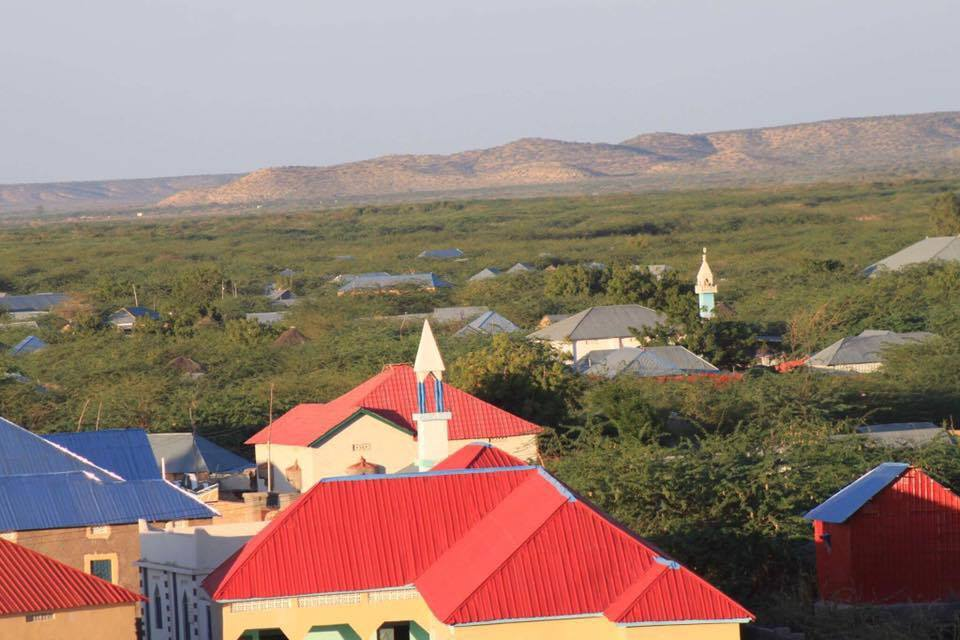
- Aerial view of Beledweyne

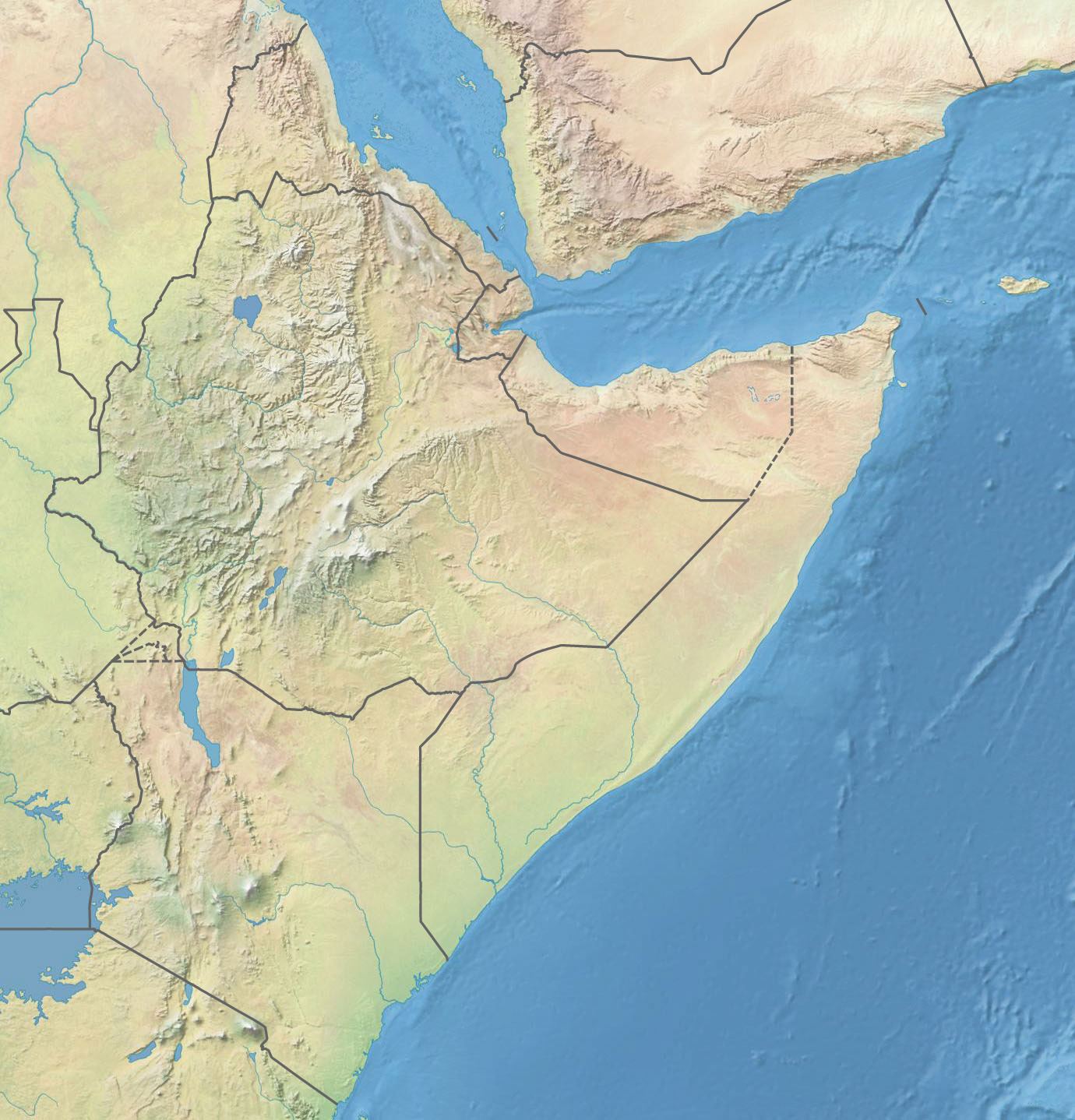
- Location within Somalia Location within the Horn of Africa Location within Africa
- Coordinates: 04°44′09″N 045°12′13″E
- Country: Somalia
- State: Hirshabelle
- Region: Hiran

Government
  - Mayor: Nadar Tabaax Malin
- Time zone: UTC+3 (EAT)

Beledweyne (Somali: Beledweyne, Arabic: بلد وين) is a city in central Somalia. Beledweyne District is the capital city of the Hiran region.

The city is situated in the Shebelle Valley riverine near the Ethiopian border, 210 miles (345 km) north of Mogadishu. Beledweyne is divided by the Shebelle River into eastern and western sections.

== History ==
During the Ethiopian invasion that occurred during June 1982, Beledweyne was a primary objective before driving onto the Somali coastline. On 30 June 1982 the first offensive came at the border town of Ferfer a few kilometers away from the city, in an attempt to capture the high ground overlooking a vital roadway connecting north and south Somalia. Despite heavy ground and air attacks, the army garrison stationed in Beledweyne inflicted heavy losses on the invaders and repulsed the Ethiopians. Soon after a stalemate ensued as the conflict became a border war.

During the invasion of Somalia in 2006, the Ethiopian Air Force began carrying out airstrikes on Islamic Courts Union targets in the city of Beledweyne and other towns in central Somalia. After Beledweyne had become the target of airstrikes, the Courts decided to withdraw from the city. There were battles in 2006, 2008, 2010 and 2011. In December 2011, the Transitional Federal Government took control of Beledweyne from al-Shabaab. Somali National Army (SNA) soldiers and around 3,000 Ethiopian Army troops descended on the city, capturing it following several hours of fighting.

In April 2008 al-Shabaab fighters killed British/Somalian Head-teacher Daud Ali and three of his teachers at the Hiran Educational Project in Beledweyne. This project had been started by Mr Ali to provide a British type education to primary-aged children in the war-torn region.

In 2009, an al-Shabaab suicide car bomber killed 57 people at a hotel. In 2013, they killed 16 people at a restaurant in October and 19 people at a police station in November. In February 2022, an al-Shabaab suicide bomber killed 14 people at a restaurant. In March 2022, they killed over 50 people in a series of attacks.

== Municipality ==
On 7 May 2012, Beledweyne held its first mayoral elections since the start of the civil war in the early 1990s. Two hundred delegates took part in the contest, which was overseen by the Hiran region's head of elections, Sadaq Omar Sabriye. Mohamed Hassan Nuriye emerged as the new city mayor, obtaining 135 votes versus 11 and 8 votes, respectively, for the two nearest competitors.

In his first day in office, Mayor Nuriye officially banned firearms within the city limits. He also warned that people found contravening the edict would have their weapons impounded and could face imprisonment. In addition, Nuriye indicated that for security reasons, government soldiers who were not on patrol should remain within their bases. Soldiers would likewise only be permitted to carry weapons in the city while conducting security operations.

To further tighten up on security, Beledweyne municipality over a three-day period started simultaneously registering all local residents. Mayor Nuriye also unveiled plans for a citywide beautification campaign. In July 2012, his administration imposed a two-day night-time curfew in Beledweyne, while government soldiers demolished structures that had been illegally erected along the area's main road in one of the Municipality's first urban renewal initiatives.

In March 2015, the Beledweyne municipality launched a civilian tax collection program in the city. The tax revenue is earmarked for essential public social services. Additionally, the city government is slated to register all local businesses, which will further facilitate tax gathering. The municipal authorities are also scheduled to set up a new citywide house numbering system.

In 2019, Safiya Jimale became the first female mayor in Somalia.

== Transportation ==
Beledweyne is served by Beledweyne Airport. As of February 2015, the Djibouti Defense Forces have refurbished the airstrip.

== Demographics ==
The district has a total population of 1,500,000 with 79/21 percent rural/urban divide, and it is inhabited by the Hawiye clan.

== Climate ==
Beledweyne has a hot arid climate (Köppen climate classification BWh). Between March and April, the average daily maximum temperature in the city is 36.7 °C or 98.1 °F. In January and February, the average daily minimum temperature is 21.8 °C or 71.2 °F.

Climate data for Beledweyne, Somalia
Month	Jan	Feb	Mar	Apr	May	Jun	Jul	Aug	Sep	Oct	Nov	Dec	Year
Record high °C (°F)	41.5 (106.7)	42.5 (108.5)	43.0 (109.4)	43.0 (109.4)	41.3 (106.3)	39.0 (102.2)	39.0 (102.2)	39.0 (102.2)	40.2 (104.4)	45.0 (113.0)	40.0 (104.0)	42.0 (107.6)	45.0 (113.0)
Mean daily maximum °C (°F)	34.5 (94.1)	35.4 (95.7)	36.7 (98.1)	36.9 (98.4)	34.9 (94.8)	34.0 (93.2)	33.0 (91.4)	33.8 (92.8)	35.3 (95.5)	34.4 (93.9)	34.8 (94.6)	34.5 (94.1)	34.8 (94.6)
Daily mean °C (°F)	28.2 (82.8)	28.7 (83.7)	30.0 (86.0)	30.4 (86.7)	29.2 (84.6)	28.4 (83.1)	27.8 (82.0)	27.7 (81.9)	29.0 (84.2)	28.7 (83.7)	28.5 (83.3)	28.5 (83.3)	28.7 (83.7)
Mean daily minimum °C (°F)	22.0 (71.6)	22.0 (71.6)	23.4 (74.1)	23.9 (75.0)	23.4 (74.1)	22.8 (73.0)	22.6 (72.7)	21.6 (70.9)	22.7 (72.9)	22.6 (72.7)	22.3 (72.1)	22.3 (72.1)	22.6 (72.7)
Record low °C (°F)	16.0 (60.8)	16.5 (61.7)	17.0 (62.6)	16.0 (60.8)	18.0 (64.4)	17.0 (62.6)	17.0 (62.6)	16.3 (61.3)	17.2 (63.0)	17.0 (62.6)	15.0 (59.0)	15.0 (59.0)	15.0 (59.0)
Average rainfall mm (inches)	0 (0)	1 (0.0)	5 (0.2)	48 (1.9)	59 (2.3)	6 (0.2)	3 (0.1)	3 (0.1)	8 (0.3)	51 (2.0)	16 (0.6)	5 (0.2)	204 (8.0)
Average rainy days (≥ 1.0 mm)	0	0	0	5	5	0	0	0	0	4	2	0	20
Average relative humidity (%)	58	57	57	60	64	61	65	64	59	64	63	62	61
Mean monthly sunshine hours	288.3	276.9	288.3	243.0	272.8	249.0	201.5	232.5	246.0	223.2	243.0	269.7	3,034.2
Mean daily sunshine hours	9.3	9.8	9.3	8.1	8.8	8.3	6.5	7.5	8.2	7.2	8.1	8.7	8.3
Percentage possible sunshine	80	79	65	53	54	61	54	62	62	57	60	69	63
Source 1: Deutscher Wetterdienst
Source 2: Food and Agriculture Organization: Somalia Water and Land Management (percent sunshine)

== Notable residents ==
- Aden Abdullah Osman Daar, first President of Somalia
- Omar Hashi Adan, National Security Minister
- Mohamed Farah Aidid, former general in the Somali National Army and warlord
