= List of terrorist incidents in 2022 =

This is a list of terrorist incidents in 2022, including attacks by violent non-state actors for political motives. Note that terrorism-related to drug wars and cartel violence is not included. Ongoing military conflicts are listed separately.

== Guidelines ==
- To be included, entries must be notable (have a stand-alone article) and described by a consensus of reliable sources as "terrorism".
- List entries must comply with the guidelines outlined in the manual of style under MOS:TERRORIST.
- Casualties figures in this list are the total casualties of the incident including immediate casualties and later casualties (such as people who succumbed to their wounds long after the attacks occurred).
- Casualties listed are the victims. Perpetrator casualties are listed separately (e.g. x (+y) indicate that x victims and y perpetrators were killed/injured).
- Casualty totals may be underestimated or unavailable due to a lack of information. A figure with a plus (+) sign indicates that at least that many people have died (e.g. 10+ indicates that at least 10 people have died) – the actual toll could be considerably higher. A figure with a plus (+) sign may also indicate that over that number of people are victims.
- If casualty figures are 20 or more, they will be shown in **bold**. In addition, figures for casualties more than 50 will also be **underlined**.
- Incidents are limited to one per location per day. If multiple attacks occur in the same place on the same day, they will be merged into a single incident.
- In addition to the guidelines above, the table also includes the following categories:

0 people were killed/injured by the incident.
1–19 people were killed/injured by the incident.
20–49 people were killed/injured by the incident.
50–99 people were killed/injured by the incident.
100+ people were killed/injured by the incident.

== List ==
Total incidents: 38

Date	Type	Dead	Injured	Location	Article	Details	Perpetrator	Part of
4–6 January	Arson, mass shooting, massacre	200+	Unknown	Zamfara State, Nigeria	2022 Zamfara massacres	Militant herdsmen attacked numerous towns across the state.	Fulani militants (suspected)	Nigerian bandit conflict
15 January	Hostage crisis	0 (+1)	0	Colleyville, Texas, United States	Colleyville synagogue hostage crisis	A British Pakistani man falsely claiming to be the brother of Pakistani prisoner Aafia Siddiqui attacked a synagogue and held four Jews hostage. The assailant was eventually shot dead.	Malik Faisal Akram	Antisemitism in the United States in the 21st-century
17 January	Drone strike	3	6	Abu Dhabi, United Arab Emirates	2022 Abu Dhabi attack	Houthi rebels attacked the capital of the UAE due to its participation in the Yemeni Civil War.	Houthi movement	Yemeni Civil War
20 January	Improvised explosive device bombing	3	28	Lahore, Pakistan	2022 Lahore bombing	An IED planted on a motorcycle in a market in the Anarkali Bazaar exploded.	Baloch Nationalist Army	Insurgency in Balochistan
21 January	Mass shooting	11	Unknown	Diyala Governorate, Iraq	2022 Diyala massacre	ISIL gunmen stormed a military base, killing soldiers as they slept.	Islamic State of Iraq and the Levant	Islamic State insurgency in Iraq
25 January	Mass shooting	10	3	Dasht, Pakistan	2022 Kech District attack	Militants stormed a security post belonging to the Pakistani military in a remote area of Balochistan. The clash lasted for a few hours and killed 10 security personnel and injured three others. One militant was killed and several others were injured or arrested.	Balochistan Liberation Front	Insurgency in Balochistan
2 February	Massacre, machete attack	60+	~40	Djugu territory, Democratic Republic of the Congo	Plaine Savo massacre	Militants attacked an IDP camp in Ituri Province.	CODECO	Ituri conflict
19 February	Suicide bombing	14	12	Beledweyne, Somalia	February 2022 Beledweyne bombing	A suicide bomber detonated inside a busy restaurant.	Al-Shabaab	Somali Civil War
2 March	Bombing	3	24	Quetta, Pakistan	March 2022 Quetta bombing	A bomb exploded near a police van. Three people, including a superintendent deputy of the police, were killed.	Islamists (suspected)	Terrorism in Pakistan
4 March	Suicide bombing, shooting	63+ (+1)	196+	Peshawar, Pakistan	2022 Peshawar mosque attack	A terrorist shot police officers at the entrance of a Shia mosque, killing two. He rushed into the mosque and blew himself up. The Islamic State claimed the attack and identified the suicide bomber as Julaybib al-Kabli.	Islamic State – Khorasan Province	Sectarian violence in Pakistan
22 March	Mass stabbing, Vehicle-ramming attack	4 (+1)	2	Beersheba, Israel	2022 Beersheba attack	A Negev Bedouin man stabbed and ran over several people.	Mohammed Abu al-Kiyan	Israeli–Palestinian conflict
23 March	Car bombing, suicide bombing, mass shooting	60+	108+	Beledweyne and Mogadishu, Somalia	March 2022 Somalia attacks	Gunman attacked Aden Adde International Airport and killed five people. A suicide bombing later took place outside a polling place in Beledweyne, killing several people along with female Member of Parliament Amina Mohamed Abdi. A car bomb was detonated outside Beledweyne hospital, killing at least 30, whilst another attack took place on a restaurant in Beledweyne.	Al-Shabaab	Somali Civil War
27 March	Mass shooting	2 (+2)	12	Hadera, Israel	2022 Hadera shooting	Two gunmen fired at civilians and police officers in the evening at a bus stop. The two Arab Israelis were then shot dead by nearby police officers.	Islamic State	Israeli–Palestinian conflict
29 March	Mass shooting	5 (+1)	0	Bnei Brak, Israel	2022 Bnei Brak shootings	A Palestinian man committed a mass shooting in the city's streets before being killed by the police.	Al-Aqsa Martyrs' Brigades	Israeli–Palestinian conflict
5 April	Stabbing	2	1	Mashhad, Iran	Imam Reza shrine stabbings	A stabbing attack at the Imam Reza shrine killed two Shia clerics and wounded another. The attacker, an Uzbek Takfiri who was illegally in Iran, was arrested immediately after the attack.	Abdullatif Muradi	Terrorism in Iran
7 April	Mass shooting	3 (+1)	11	Tel Aviv, Israel	2022 Tel Aviv shooting	A gunman committed a mass shooting on Dizengoff Street.	Raad Hazem	Israeli–Palestinian conflict
12 April	Mass shooting	0	29	New York City, United States	2022 New York City Subway attack	A 62-year-old Black supremacist opened fire on a crowded subway. Ten people were injured by gunfire, while a further 19 suffered injuries while trying to escape.	Frank James	
19 April	Bombings	6	25	Kabul, Afghanistan	April 2022 Kabul school bombing	Three bombs targeted the Abdul Rahim Shahid School in the Shia Hazara neighborhood of Kabul.	Islamic State - Khorasan Province (suspected)	Islamic State–Taliban conflict
21 April	Bombing	31	87	Mazar-i-Sharif, Afghanistan	2022 Mazar-i-Sharif mosque bombing	A remote-controlled booby trapped bag exploded in the Shia Seh Dokan mosque.	Islamic State - Khorasan Province	Islamic State–Taliban conflict
22 April	Bombing	33	43	Kunduz, Afghanistan	2022 Kunduz mosque bombing	Bomb attack at the Sufi Khanaqa-e-Malawi Sikandar mosque.	Islamic State - Khorasan Province	Islamic State–Taliban conflict
22 April	Suicide bombing	6	7	Mogadishu, Somalia	April 2022 Mogadishu bombing	A suicide bombing took place at Pescatore Seafood Restaurant in the seaside area of Lido beach.	Al-Shabaab	Somali Civil War
26 April	Suicide bombing	4 (+1)	4	Karachi, Pakistan	2022 University of Karachi bombing	A female suicide bomber struck a van near the University of Karachi's Confucius Institute, killing three Chinese citizens and their Pakistani driver.	Baloch Liberation Army	Insurgency in Balochistan
5 May	Mass stabbing	3	4	El'ad, Israel	2022 El'ad stabbing	Two Palestinian men attacked people celebrating Israel's Independence Day in a park with axes.	As'ad Alrafa'ani and Sabhi Shajir	Israeli–Palestinian conflict
14 May	Mass shooting	10	3	Buffalo, New York, United States	2022 Buffalo shooting	10 people, all of whom were black, were killed and 3 more injured in a racially motivated mass shooting at a supermarket.	Payton S. Gendron	Terrorism in the United States
5 June	Mass shooting, bombing	41+	61+	Owo, Nigeria	Owo church attack	Five terrorists attacked the St. Francis Xavier Catholic Church in Ondo State while worshippers were celebrating Pentecost.	Islamic State – West Africa Province (suspected)	Boko Haram insurgency
12 June	Massacre	100+	Unknown	Seytenga Department, Burkina Faso	2022 Seytenga massacre	Suspected jihadists attacked the village of Seytenga. They went from shop to shop to kill the men, the women and children were spared. Homes were burned down.	Jama'at Nasr al-Islam wal Muslimin (suspected)	Jihadist insurgency in Burkina Faso
18–19 June	Mass shooting, massacre	132	Unknown	Bankass Cercle, Mali	2022 Bankass massacres	Unidentified gunmen killed civilians in Diallassagou and nearby villages in Mopti Region. The attackers also burned huts, houses, and stole cattle.	Macina Liberation Front	Mali War
16 July	Mass shooting	10	2	Nduga Regency, Indonesia	Nonggolait shooting	Around 20 gunmen attacked the village of Nogolait, Highland Papua.	West Papua National Liberation Army	Papua conflict
12 August	Stabbing	0	2	Chautauqua, New York, United States	Stabbing of Salman Rushdie	On August 12, 2022, novelist Salman Rushdie was stabbed multiple times as he was about to give a public lecture at the Chautauqua Institution in Chautauqua, New York, United States. Rushdie was gravely wounded and hospitalized.	Hadi Matar	Islamic extremism in the United States
19–21 August	Car bombing, mass shooting	30+	120+	Mogadishu, Somalia	August 2022 Mogadishu attack	Two car bombs exploded at the Hayat Hotel. Afterwards gunmen besieged the hotel, shooting at people and taking hostages. After 30 hours the security forces ended the attack.	Al-Shabaab	Somali Civil War
5 September	Attempted suicide bombing	10+ (+1)	15–20	Kabul, Afghanistan	Bombing of the Russian embassy in Kabul	A suicide bomber approached the Russian embassy. The attacker was shot dead by security forces, but his explosives went off after he was killed.	Islamic State – Khorasan Province	Islamic State–Taliban conflict
12 October	Shooting	2 (+1)	1	Bratislava, Slovakia	2022 Bratislava shooting	Shooting in front of the Tepláreň gay bar, a well-known spot frequented by the local LGBT community, the shooter was found dead the next day.	Juraj Krajčík	Right-wing terrorism in Europe
26 October	Mass shooting	13–15	40+	Shiraz, Iran	Shah Cheragh attack	Mass shooting at Shah Cheragh mosque. Authorities stated that the attackers were not Iranian nationals.	Islamic State	Terrorism in Iran
29 October	Car bombing	121+	300	Mogadishu, Somalia	October 2022 Mogadishu bombings	Double car bombing at Zobe junction.	Al-Shabaab	Somali Civil War
13 November	Bombing	6	81	Istanbul, Turkey	2022 Istanbul bombing	A bomb in a bag exploded next to a bench on İstiklal Avenue. Police arrested a Syrian woman, Ahlam Albashır, whom they say planted the bomb.	PKK (suspected by Turkey)	Kurdish–Turkish conflict
12 December	Shootings	3 (+3)	1	Wieambilla, Queensland, Australia	Wieambilla shootings	Three Christians fatally shot two police officers and their neighbour before being shot by SERT officers.	Nathaniel Train, Stacey Train and Gareth Train	Christian terrorism and terrorism in Australia
25 December	Bombing	10	5	near Bougui,Est Region, Burkina Faso	2022 Bougui bombing	A bus traveling from Fada N'gourma to the trading town of Kantchari hit a landmine near the village of Bougui.	Unknown	Jihadist insurgency in Burkina-Faso
