= 2022 in Somalia =

- Decades: 2000s; 2010s; 2020s
- See also: History of Somalia; List of years in Somalia

This list article covers significant events in the year 2022 in Somalia.

== Incumbents ==
- President: Mohamed Abdullahi Farmajo (until 15 May), Hassan Sheikh Mohamud (since 15 May)
- Prime Minister: Mohamed Hussein Roble (until 15 June), Hamza Abdi Barre (since 15 June)
- Speaker of the Senate: Mohamed Ali Yusuf (until 26 April) Abdi Hashi Abdullahi (since 26 April)
- Speaker of the House: Mohamed Mursal Sheikh Abdurahman (until 28 April), Aden Madobe (since 28 April)

== Events ==
=== Ongoing ===
- Somali Civil War (2009–present) (timeline)
- Controversies of Hassan Sheikh Mohamud
- COVID-19 pandemic in Somalia

=== January ===
- 10 January – Somali leaders announce they struck a deal to complete presidential and parliamentary elections by 25 February after repeated delays.
- 18 January – At least four people are killed and ten others injured in Mogadishu by a suicide bombing at a tea shop near a military base.
- 24 January – The US Embassy in Mogadishu welcomes ambassador Larry André Jr. arrival to discuss the upcoming 25 February elections with government officials.

=== February ===
- 19 February – February 2022 Beledweyne bombing: An al-Shabaab suicide bomber kills 14 people at a restaurant in Beledweyne, including a candidate in the parliamentary vote.
- 24 February – Only 175 of the 275 MPs are reported to have been elected for the elections set to take place the next day as the federal states continue debates over venues, delegates, and fairness of the polls.
- 25 February – The scheduled presidential and parliamentary elections are again postponed to 15 March.

=== March ===
- March – Nearly 90% of the country's districts are affected by a historic multi-season drought. Fourteen million people are severely food insecure across the Horn of Africa, including Somalia.
- 15 March – The presidential and parliamentary elections are again further postponed to 31 March in order to complete the election of the Lower House or House of the People.
- 16 March – The United States applies visa restrictions to individual Somalis the United States felt were responsible for failing to meet the 15 March deadline to finish parliamentary elections.
- 17 March – United States senators Jim Risch (R-Idaho), Chris Van Hollen (D-Maryland), and Mike Rounds (R-South Dakota), introduce a bill titled the Somaliland Partnership Act, calling for closer U.S. engagement with the unrecognized nation.
- 19 March – Governor of Puntland Said Abdullahi Dani announces his candidacy in the Lower House elections.
- 23 March – Al-Shabaab kills at least 48 people and injures at least 108 in a series of attacks in Mogadishu and Beledweyne, including Somali female Member of Parliament Amina Mohamed Abdi.
- 27 March – Al-Shabaab militants overrun the Af Urur military base in Puntland, killing four soldiers.
- 30 March – A prayer meeting is held in Mogadishu for MP Amina Mohamed Abdi who was killed in Beledweyne on 23 March.
- 31 March
  - The 2022 Somali presidential election was scheduled to be held.
  - The U.N. Security Council votes unanimously to endorse the African Union’s new transitional mission in Somalia ATMIS, which will replace AMISOM which had been present in the country for fifteen years.

=== April ===
- 1 April – 2022 Waheen Market fire: A large fire destroys main market (Waheen Market) in the city of Hargeisa, destroying an estimated 2,000 shops and stalls and injuring 28 people.
- 4 April – Mogadishu offers to send $11.7 million to Hargeisa to help those who lost their lives and property in the Waheen market fire.
- 6 April – PM Roble orders African Union Ambassador to Somalia Francisco Madeira, persona non grata to leave the country within 48 hours because of "engaging in acts that are incompatible with his status," after audio emerged of him criticizing government officials for not dealing with national security problems. President Mohamed immediately rejected the expulsion.
- 10 April
  - If no aid is brought to Somalia by the summer of this year, "350,000 of the 1.4 million severely malnourished children in the country, will perish," warns OCHA member Adam Abdelmoula.
  - The Saudi Ministry of Islamic Affairs, Dawah and Guidance launches an iftar program, in the presence of representatives from Saudi Arabia and Somalia, to distribute food to help people break their fasts throughout Ramadan.
- 11 April
  - Federal Electoral Implementation Team (FEIT) chairman Muse Guelleh Yusuf travels to Baidoa to help solve a dispute over four Lower House seats that were nullified by the commission. The trip was a success, two-seat disputes were resolved, and a re-run was organized for another candidate who won (Saredo Mohamed Abdalla) but did not meet the age limit.
  - National security advisor Fahad Yasin files a petition with the nascent Supreme Court over an election dispute.
- 14 April
  - The Lower House or House of the People elections finally concluded after four months of delay, swearing in 205 new parliament members. 54 senators and over 246 Lower House members took oath for the upcoming presidential elections. There is wide criticism following the elections, though, that only a few thousand people of the 16.3 million in Somalia voted for a member of parliament. "Massive corruption, abuse of power, and disregard of the election's rules" are all reasons to blame, according to the BBC.
  - National security advisor Fahad Yasin does not receive a FEIT certification for his seat after it is nullified by the electoral commission for electoral irregularities and is scheduled for a re-run.
  - The first women-run radio and television company opened in Mogadishu. Supported by the United Nations, Bilan Media plans to produce stories important to women and their rights.
- 16 April – A new African Union ambassador is expected to come to Somalia to replace Francisco Madeira after a controversy on 6 April soured relations.
- 18 April – Jihadist terrorist group al-Shabaab claims responsibility for a mortar fire attack on Somalia's parliament that injures at least six people during the joint session.
- 19 April – The Somali government and a U.S.-based company, Coastline Exploration Ltd., dispute the validity of an oil exploration agreement in February in Istanbul. Minister of Petroleum and Mineral Resources Abdirashid Mohamed Ahmed is happy to implement the oil deal, which, after a 5% royalty, would split profit 50/50, while Somali President Mohamed and PM Roble reject the deal, declaring it "null and void," citing government decrees banning all ministries and government agencies from signing agreements with foreign governments and organizations until the ongoing parliamentary elections are finalized.
- 22 April – An al-Shabaab suicide bombing takes place at the Pescatore Seafood Restaurant in Lido Beach, killing at least six people and injuring seven.
- 25 April – Two legislators accuse intelligence agents of opening fire on a lawmaker's car and getting into a shootout outside a hotel where parliamentarians were being sworn in. This alleged attack is condemned by PM Roble.

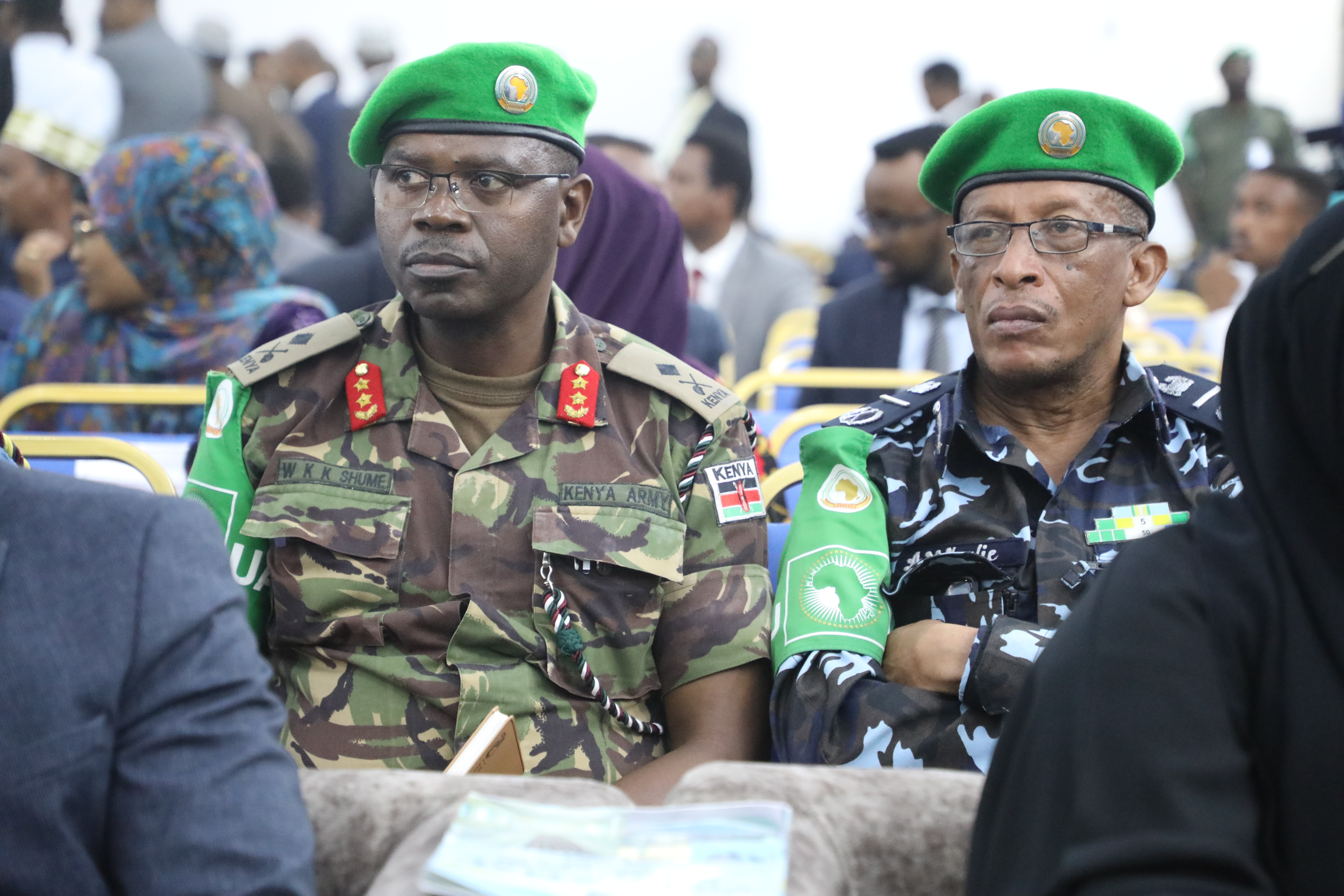
Deputy Force Commander of the African Union Transition Mission in Somalia at the Speaker of the House elections

- 26 April
  - Speaker of the House Abdi Hashi Abdullahi is reelected in a vote by the 54-seat Upper House of Parliament. In the vote, Abdullahi won 28 votes, while his rival Salah Jama, got only 24 votes. Osman Dubbe won the remaining 2 votes.
  - PM Roble authorises ATMIS peacekeepers to secure an aeroplane hangar in Mogadishu where a speaker of the lower house of parliament should be voted on on 27 April and to take care of the necessary security responsibilities for a successful election as well. President Mohamed countermanded the order, saying police are responsible for security.
- 27 April
  - Internal Minister of Security Abdullahi Haji Hassan Mohamed Nuur, a close ally of PM Roble, suspends the Chief of Police, Maj. Gen. Abdi Hassan Mohamed Hijar for "sabotaging" elections and taking instructions from Villa Somalia, which are supposed to conclude today with the Lower House electing the leadership of the new parliament. To still ensure the security of the elections, the work of the Commander will continue with the Deputy Commander.
  - Before his dismissal, Maj. Gen. Hijar insisted he wanted the lower house elections today to be postponed because he could not guarantee proper security.
  - Police tried to block the entrance to the aeroplane hangar organized yesterday for lower house parliament elections to take place, but Roble's security forces ordered them to leave, according to Reuters journalists at the scene.
- 28 April
  - Lower House parliamentary elections conclude, electing Aden Madobe as the new Speaker of the House in a vote that was delayed most of the previous day due to disagreements over the security of the venue of the vote. Nur beat his nearest rival 98 to 74 votes. Both President Mohamed and PM Roble send congratulatory messages on their Twitter accounts.

=== May ===
- 3 May – Al-Shabaab jihadists armed with guns and explosives storm an ATMIS base, triggering a fierce firefight killing 30 soldiers and wounding another 22 Burundi peacekeepers, according to a high-ranking Burundian military officer. A dozen soldiers were also declared missing. This was the first-ever attack on ATMIS since taking over AMISOM on 31 March.
- 7 May – Government officials ask the International Monetary Fund (IMF) to extend its financial support program to the country, worth nearly $400 million, by three months to 17 August, according to the head of the IMF's country mission. This comes as the deadline for the IMF's funding cutoff on 17 May draws nearer, and will only continue if presidential elections are concluded by this date.
- 9 May – The US Agency for International Development (USAID) announces a new $6.8 million initiative called the Stabilization Through Education Program (STEP) to increase access to education in communities affected by conflict and rehabilitating more than 200 damaged classrooms and related school infrastructure.
- 11 May – Four people are killed, including two police officers and many wounded in a suicide bombing at a checkpoint near Mogadishu Airport. Al-Shabaab claimed responsibility for the attack.
- 11–20 May – US General and Commander of the US Africa Command Stephen Townsend visits many civilian and military leaders in primarily East African nations including Somalia and Somaliland. The trip concludes with his visit to Somalia, where he discussed the US Security agenda in the region and "satisfaction with the polls" of the presidential election on 15 May.
- 12 May – The price of AK-47's in gun markets dramatically rise ahead of the upcoming presidential election on 15 May.
- 14 May – A curfew is set in place in Mogadishu from 9 pm to 6 am tomorrow ahead of tomorrow's presidential elections.
- 15 May
  - The Presidential elections, after 142 days of delay, concluded with the election of former president Hassan Sheikh Mohamud, head of the Union for Peace and Development Party (UPD). The voting was broadcast live on state TV, where Mohamud received 212 electoral votes and President Mohamed only 109. Mohamud is immediately sworn in, promising his new government would be inclusive and acknowledge previous mistakes including corruption.
  - Supporters of the new President Mohamud defy the curfew in Mogadishu to cheer and fire guns in the streets in celebration of the election's outcome.
- 16 May
  - US President Joe Biden approves a request by The Pentagon to redeploy "under 500" US troops to the nation to counter al-Shabaab terrorists, according to a senior administration official. This reverses a decision by former US President Donald Trump to withdraw all US troops from the country in December 2020.
  - Former President Mohamed concedes defeat and congratulates new President Mohamud, urging support for the incoming administration in a Twitter post. The United States, Ethiopia and China all congratulate President Mohamud on his election.
- 17 May – New President Mohamud thanks Biden on Twitter for returning US troops to the nation to counter al-Shabaab, calling the United States "a reliable partner in our quest to stability and fight against terrorism".
- 19 May – PM Roble, along with a delegation of Somalis, fly to Dubai in the UAE to return $9.6 million seized from a plane from the nation back in April 2018 in an attempt to mend poor relationships between the nations ever since.
- 20 May
  - With the election of a new president, the IMF agrees to prolong their 400 million dollar monetary support for Somalia for another three months until 17 August, giving itself time to consult with the new government.
  - President of the United Arab Emirates (UAE) Sheikh Mohamed bin Zayed Al Nahyan orders د.إ35 million AED of humanitarian aid to be sent to Somalia to support development and alleviate poverty, according to state news agency WAM.
  - The Human Rights Watch implores the US military to prioritize protecting Somali civilians with the recent announcement of redeployment of 500 Special Forces troops to the nation on 16 May.
- 21 May – President Mohamud and now former President Mohamed tour Villa Somalia and hold key meetings discussing the economy, security, and the upcoming transition of powers on 23 May.
- 23 May – Former President Mohamed formally cedes all governmental power to President Mohamud in a ceremony at Villa Somalia in Mogadishu, which many government officials attend. In Mohamed's speech, he also for the first time admitted to sending 5,000 soldiers to Eritrea last year to undergo training, and said their return was "delayed to prevent political upheaval".
- 24 May
  - PM Roble suspends Foreign Affairs Minister Abdisaid Muse Ali over his alleged authorisation to illegally export charcoal to Oman in violation of international sanctions. PM Roble also orders an audit and judicial investigation into the ministry's shipment authorisation. Citing historically poor ties and cooperation between the PM and Ali, VOA News reports Ali's removal from office by Roble was incoming, especially because it is believed that PM Roble will only have a few more days in office after the inauguration of President Mohamud.
  - Somali authorities officially request an extension of the 17 August funding cutoff date set by the IMF for unstated reasons.
- 31 May – President Mohamud arrives in Baidoa for the first time since his election on 15 May to gain popular support of the South West State, with it having the largest number of members in parliament.

=== June ===
- June – The ongoing drought within the nation grows more severe after a fourth consecutive rainy season failure, causing 7.1 million Somalis or nearly half the population, to face food insecurity and 213,000 Somalis to face starvation, a nearly threefold increase from levels expected in April. This food insecurity has forced about 800,000 Somalis from their homes as a result. 3 million livestock have also reportedly been killed because of the drought.
- 3 June – The United States launched an airstrike against Al-Shabaab militants near Beer Xaani for the first time since the nation returned to Somalia on 16 May. The strike killed an estimated five militants and no civilians.
- 7 June
  - The UN announces that only $250 million has been raised in donor funding, which is only a third of what is needed to help combat food insecurity within the nation.
  - Major supporters of the former president; director of Villa Somalia Mohamed Abdullahi Isse, former spokesman for Villa Somalia Abdirashid Mohamed Hashi, Banaadir deputy governor Cali Abdi Wardhere, and Canadian-based cleric Abdirizaq Hirsi, campaign on social media to raise funding to build a house for him after he departed from Villa Somalia as a "thank you to Farmajo" for "maintaining good national security". This donation campaign is negatively received by many, especially in this time of severe drought within the nation.
  - The first few diplomats arrive in the nation at the Aden Abdulle International Airport to attend the official inauguration ceremony of the new President Mohamud on 9 June.
- 8 June
  - Mogadishu is locked down from this night into tomorrow at 5 pm in wait for the official inauguration ceremony of the new President Mohamud, and for the safety of the many important diplomats attending, according to PM Roble.
  - Senior Al-Shabaab militant Mustaf Ishak Ali surrenders to the Somali National Army 60th Division in Baidoa after saying he has "abandoned the militant group's ideology of causing horrific acts of atrocities against the Somali people".
- 9 June
  - The official inauguration ceremony of the new President Mohamud takes place this morning. The event is attended by many diplomats, most notably; every president of Somalia's federal states, Kenyan President Uhuru Kenyatta, Djibouti President Ismail Omar Guelleh, Ethiopian PM Abiy Ahmed, Egyptian PM Mostafa Madbouly, South Sudan's second VP Taban Deng Gai, Ugandan Defence Minister Vincent Ssempijja, Saudi Foreign Minister Faisal bin Farhan Al Saud, and additional delegations from the UAE, Qatar, Turkey, and Malaysia, showing hopeful signs of strong international cooperation with the new president.
  - Al-Shabaab claims responsibility for a landmine explosion targeted at the Danab Brigade early in the morning on the outskirts of the Bal'ad District, which they claim killed at least 15 soldiers and destroyed one vehicle.
- 10 June
  - Mogadishu celebrates in the Platinum Jubilee of Elizabeth II, as British Ambassador to Somalia Kate Foster gave a speech to celebrate towards a large crowd in English and Somali.
  - President Mohamud agrees to lift a ban since March 2020 on air freighting khat or Miraa from Kenya in an attempt to better relations with the nation, which were soured under President Mohamed, according to Kenya's agriculture minister.
- 11–12 June – A National Consultative Assembly meeting takes place in Villa Somalia, marking the first meeting of political leaders in the nation since the presidential election. The meeting was a large success, producing a completed draft constitution, implementation of a national security system (the London National Security Agreement, in draft since 2017), basic workings for a democratic electoral system, achieving some kind of a political and social agreement in the nation, agreeing to give priority to talks with Somaliland, agreement to accelerate and complete the federal system, and the completion of an independent judicial process.
- 12 June
  - Italian Foreign Minister Luigi Di Maio meets with President Mohamud to congratulate him on his election, as well as to discuss issues with ATMIS and how the two nations could potentially work together to rebuild the national army.
  - Qatar provides food aid to combat the ongoing drought within the nation, which is estimated to alleviate 7,000 people in Baidoa.
- 13 June – US Secretary for Political Affairs Victoria Nuland holds a press conference with President Mohamud to reaffirm that the role of the recently returned US Military in the nation is to "train, support, and equip Somali National Army and AU forces". Nuland also announced plans to provide the Horn of Africa with $105 million in new humanitarian aid.
- 14 June – Kenya expresses their "regrets" towards Somalia after inviting a Somaliland official to a diplomatic luncheon hosted by President Uhuru Kenyatta, where the Somalia ambassador to Kenya Mohamoud Ahmed Nur was also a guest. Nur regarded the presence of the Somaliland official at the meeting and the presence of the Somali flag as "inappropriate" and walked out. A statement later released by the Somaliland said they were "outraged" by the ambassador's actions.
- 15 June – President Mohamud appoints former chairman of the Jubbaland state election commission Hamza Abdi Barre as the nation's new Prime Minister, replacing Mohamed Hussein Roble. "I ask the parliament to approve him as soon as possible," Mohamud said on national television.
- 17 June – Armed residents and local security forces in Galmudug killed 70 Al-Shabaab fighters while repulsing a raid by militants on Bahdo just after morning prayers, according to a local official. According to Al-Shabaab's Radio Andalus, the al Qaeda-linked group lost nine fighters and said its fighters had killed 27 soldiers during the battle.
- 20 June – President Mohamud arrives in Abu Dhabi on an official two-day visit to the UAE. Minister of State Nahyan bin Mubarak Al Nahyan and other officials welcomed Mohamud upon his arrival at Abu Dhabi International Airport. With the next in line for power Speaker of the Lower House Aden Madobe also out of country, First Deputy Speaker of the House Sadia Yasin Samatar becomes the first acting female president in Somalia history.
- 22 June
  - President Mohamud meets with the President of the UAE Mohammed bin Zayed Al Nahyan in Abu Dhabi. Nahyan congratulated Mohamud on his presidential victory and reinstated their nation's full and continuous support for Somali people to achieve their "aspirations for development, stability, prosperity, and building a better future for their people".
  - The World Bank approved US$143 million in International Development Assistance (IDA) to aid vulnerable Somalis struggling with drought and food insecurity across the country.
- 24 June – Speculation emerged that President Mohamud conducted a "secret trip to Israel," despite the two nations having no diplomatic relations after he visited the UAE, which continued longer than expected. Presidential spokesman Abdikarin Ali Kaar at a press conference, completely denied this allegation, saying the return home from the UAE has been delayed due to some delegation of Mohamud's contracting COVID-19.
- 25 June – The more than 200 members of the lower house of Parliament unanimously approve Barre as the new Prime Minister.

=== July ===
- 20 July – Al-Shabaab raids Yeed and Aato in Bakool, Somalia, near the Ethiopian border. Fourteen Ethiopian police officers and three civilians are killed.
- 27 July – Eleven people, including a government official, are killed by an al-Shabaab suicide bombing at the entrance to a government building in Merca, Lower Shabelle.

=== August ===
- 19 August – August 2022 Mogadishu attack: At least 10 people are killed as al-Shabaab gunmen storm a hotel in Mogadishu, following two car bomb blasts and gunfire.
- 21 August – The siege at a hotel seized by al-Shabaab fighters in Mogadishu ends with the deaths of all of the attackers. Twenty-one other people were killed, and 117 others were injured.

=== September ===
- 3 September – Twenty people are killed in a mass shooting by al-Shabaab insurgents against vehicles transporting food supplies from Beledweyne to Mahas in the Hiran region.
- 25 September – One soldier is killed and six others are injured in a suicide bombing in Mogadishu.

=== October ===
- 3 October – October 2022 Beledweyne bombings
- 23 October – 2022 Kismayo hotel attack
- 29 October – October 2022 Mogadishu bombings

=== November ===
- 3 November – Two people are killed, and five others are injured when a vehicle carrying students hits a roadside bomb in Mogadishu, Somalia.
- 7 November – Ten people are killed by al-Shabaab militants at a military base in Galguduud.
- 25 November – The military of Somalia carries out a series of counterterrorism operations in southern Somalia, killing 15 al-Shabaab members who survived a previous operation two days ago, in which 49 fighters were killed. The military also says that they stopped an attack in Qayib, Galmudug, killing dozens of militants.
- 27 November – November 2022 Mogadishu attack: Eight civilians and a soldier are killed and several others, including Somalia's internal security minister, are injured when al-Shabaab jihadists attack a hotel in Mogadishu frequented by Somali politicians. Five insurgents are also killed.

=== December ===
- 22 December – Somalia's ministry of defense says that the military has recaptured the key town of Runirgod from al-Shabaab. 150 insurgents were killed and 15 others were arrested in the operation.
- 25 December – Fourteen Iranian fishermen are returned to Iran after eight years of captivity in Somalia. The men were found in Somalia by police last month and freed from al-Shabaab jihadists after negotiations between the captors, tribal chiefs and Somali elders.

== Sports ==
=== 2022 Arab Futsal Cup ===
Group 1 qualifications

- 20 June – Mauritania 8 - 1 Somalia
- 21 June – Somalia 0 - 16 Morocco
- 22 June – Somalia 2 - 9 Kuwait

== Deaths ==
- 23 March
  - Amina Mohamed Abdi, 40, politician, victim of suicide bombing.
  - Hassan Dhuhul, unknown age, politician, victim of suicide bombing.
- 3 April – Zahra Jama, 80, one of the first Somali immigrants to Britain, unknown death.
- 27 July – Abdullahi Ali Ahmed Waafow, general and politician, MP and mayor of Merca.
- 18 August – Mohamed Ibrahim Warsame Hadrawi, 79, Somali poet, philosopher and songwriter

== See also ==
- 2022 in East Africa
- 2022 in Somaliland
- COVID-19 pandemic in Africa
