= 2022 Somalia attacks =

2022 Somalia attacks may refer to:

- February 2022 Beledweyne bombing
- March 2022 Somalia attacks
- April 2022 Mogadishu bombing
- August 2022 Mogadishu attack
- October 2022 Beledweyne bombings
- October 2022 Mogadishu bombings
- November 2022 Mogadishu attack

== See also ==
- 2022 timeline of the Somali Civil War
