= 2022 Mogadishu bombings =

2022 Mogadishu bombings may refer to:

- April 2022 Mogadishu bombing
- August 2022 Mogadishu attack
- October 2022 Mogadishu bombings
- November 2022 Mogadishu attack
