= 2022 Mogadishu hotel attack =

2022 Mogadishu hotel attack may refer to:

- August 2022 Mogadishu attack
- November 2022 Mogadishu attack
