= Barak Lufan =

Israeli kayaker, canoeist (1987–2022)

- ברק לופן
- Born: 2 January 1987; Kibbutz Ginosar, Israel
- Died: 8 April 2022 (aged 35); Tel Aviv, Israel
- Cause of death: 2022 Tel Aviv shooting
- Resting place: Kibbutz Ginosar, Israel
- Children: 3

Barak Lufan (Hebrew: ברק לופן; 2 January 1987 – 8 April 2022) was an Israeli kayaker and the head of the Israel Canoe Association.

== Early and personal life ==
Lufan was born in 1987 in Kibbutz Ginosar. His grandparents were among the original founders of the kibbutz. He had three children.

== Career ==
Lufan was a trainer for the Israeli Paralympic team, and served as the Israel Canoe Association's head coach. Ynet wrote that he was "once considered one of Israel's leading kayakers."

He took part in the 2006 ICF Canoe Sprint World Championships along with Michael Kolganov.

== Death ==
On 7 April 2022, Palestinian gunman Raad Hazem shot nine people, three fatally, including Lufan, in a mass shooting at the Ilka bar on Dizengoff Street, Tel Aviv. Two men died shortly after, and Lufan died from his injuries in Tel Aviv Sourasky Medical Center. the following day.

The Olympic Committee of Israel expressed their solidarity with Lufan. In honour of his death, 40 kayakers sailed down the Yarkon River in a flotilla. His personal kayak was placed at the pier to serve as a memorial.
