= 2022 timeline of the Somali Civil War =

This is a 2022 timeline of events in the Somali Civil War (2009–present).

== January–March ==
- 19 February: An al-Shabaab suicide bomber kills 14 people at a restaurant in Beledweyne.
- 23 March: Al-Shabaab jihadists carry out a series of four coordinated attacks in Mogadishu and Beledweyne, killing at least 60 people.

== April–June ==
- 22 April: An al-Shabaab suicide bomber kills six people at a seafood restaurant frequented by politicians in Lido Beach, Mogadishu.

== July–September ==
- 20–25 July: Hundreds of al-Shabaab insurgents invade Ethiopia, advancing up to 150 kilometres (93 mi) into Ethiopian territory before being defeated.
- 19–21 August: Al-Shabaab suicide bombers and gunmen attack a hotel in Mogadishu, killing 21 people and taking hostages.

== October–December ==
- 3 October: October 2022 Beledweyne bombings
- 23 October: 2022 Kismayo hotel attack
- 29 October: October 2022 Mogadishu bombings: a twin car bombing in Mogadishu by al-Shabaab kills 121 people.
- 27 November: November 2022 Mogadishu attack
- 5 December: Somali forces and allied militias seized Adan Yabal from Al-Shabaab.
