= 2022 Hadera shooting =

ISIL terrorist attack in Hadera, Israel

2022 Hadera attack
- Part of Arab–Israeli conflict
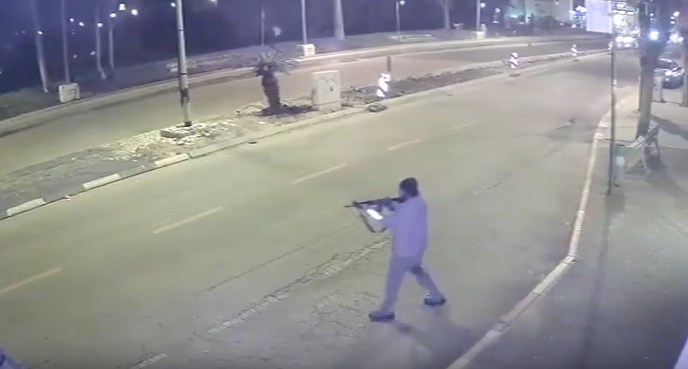
- Ayman and Ibrahim Ighbariah, seen holding firearms during the shooting

- The attack site
- Native name: פיגוע הירי בחדרה
- Location: 32°26′17″N 34°54′43″E; Herbert Samuel Street, Hadera, Israel
- Date: 27 March 2022 c. 20:30 pm
- Attack type: Mass shooting
- Weapons: Browning HP, unknown craft made pistol, M4 carbine
- Deaths: 4 (including both perpetrators)
- Injuries: 12
- Perpetrator: Islamic State
- No. of participants: 2
- Motive: Islamic terrorism

On 27 March 2022, two Islamic State gunmen opened fire at a bus stop in Hadera, Israel, killing two people and injuring twelve.

The attack came as Israel held the Negev Summit, a conference between Israeli authorities and representatives of Egypt, Bahrain, Morocco, and the United Arab Emirates (the latter three had signed the Abraham Accords) were meeting in Sde Boker coinciding with a visit to Israel by United States secretary of state Antony Blinken.

== Attack ==
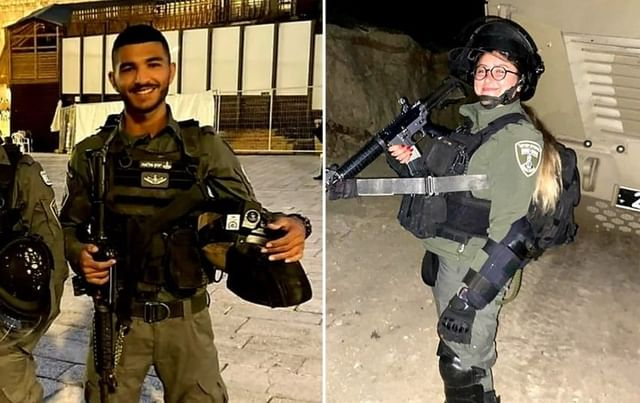
Yazan Falah, left, and Shirel Abukarat, the two Border Police officers killed

The terrorists attacked in the evening at a bus stop close to a group of restaurants. Equipped with assault rifles, the terrorists deliberately fired at civilians and police officers, killing two 19-year old Israel Border Police officers, Yazan Falah and Shirel Abukarat. According to the Magen David Adom, ten more people were wounded, including three police officers. Two of the injured suffered serious injuries. The attackers were subsequently shot dead by undercover police officers who had been dining at a nearby restaurant.

== Assailants ==
The two terrorists, Ayman and Ibrahim Ighbariah, were identified as Arab Israeli cousins from Umm al-Fahm.

They had posted a video of them embracing in front of an Islamic State flag prior to the attack. Ibrahim had previously been caught 2016 by Turkish authorities for attempting to join Islamic State forces in Syria, and had served 18 months in an Israeli jail.

== Aftermath ==
Hamas, Hezbollah, and the Palestinian Islamic Jihad praised the attack, but they did not take responsibility.

The funerals of Yazan Falah and Shirel Abukarat took place the following day. Thousands of people, including politicians and senior police officials, attended both funerals. Falah, an Israeli Druze, was buried in the military cemetery of Kisra-Sumei, his hometown. Public Security Minister Omer Bar-Lev, Justice Minister Gideon Sa'ar, and Mowafaq Tarif, the spiritual leader of Israel's Druze community, were in attendance. Abukarat, a French-Israeli, was buried at the military cemetery of her hometown of Netanya. Tourism Minister Yoel Razvozov and Netanya mayor Miriam Feirberg attended the funeral.

The Foreign Ministers of the four Arab countries attending the Negev Summit condemned the attack. Antony Blinken, who was visiting Israel when the attack happened, tweeted that "senseless acts of violence and murder have no place in society".

The Islamic State claimed responsibility for the attack later that day via Amaq News Agency, making it the first time ISIL had claimed responsibility for an attack in Israel since June 2017 Jerusalem attack. Omer Bar-Lev said that police would be "deploy[ed] in all areas", describing it as a major security threat. Five people suspected of having ties to the attackers were arrested by police.

The Times of Israel reported that Umm al-Fahm municipality's Facebook page had posted an entry mourning the Ighbariahs' deaths. Mayor Samir Subhi Mahameed apologised and stated that the post was made by an outside firm that runs the city's social media accounts. He announced his resignation shortly after the incident, but then changed track and decided not to quit.

== See also ==
- Media related to Hadera shooting attack (2022) at Wikimedia Commons
- Hadera attack (disambiguation)
- 2022 Beersheba attack
- 2022 Tel Aviv shooting
- List of terrorist incidents in 2022
- Timeline of the Israeli–Palestinian conflict in 2022
