= Negev Summit =

2022 conference in Sde Boker, Israel

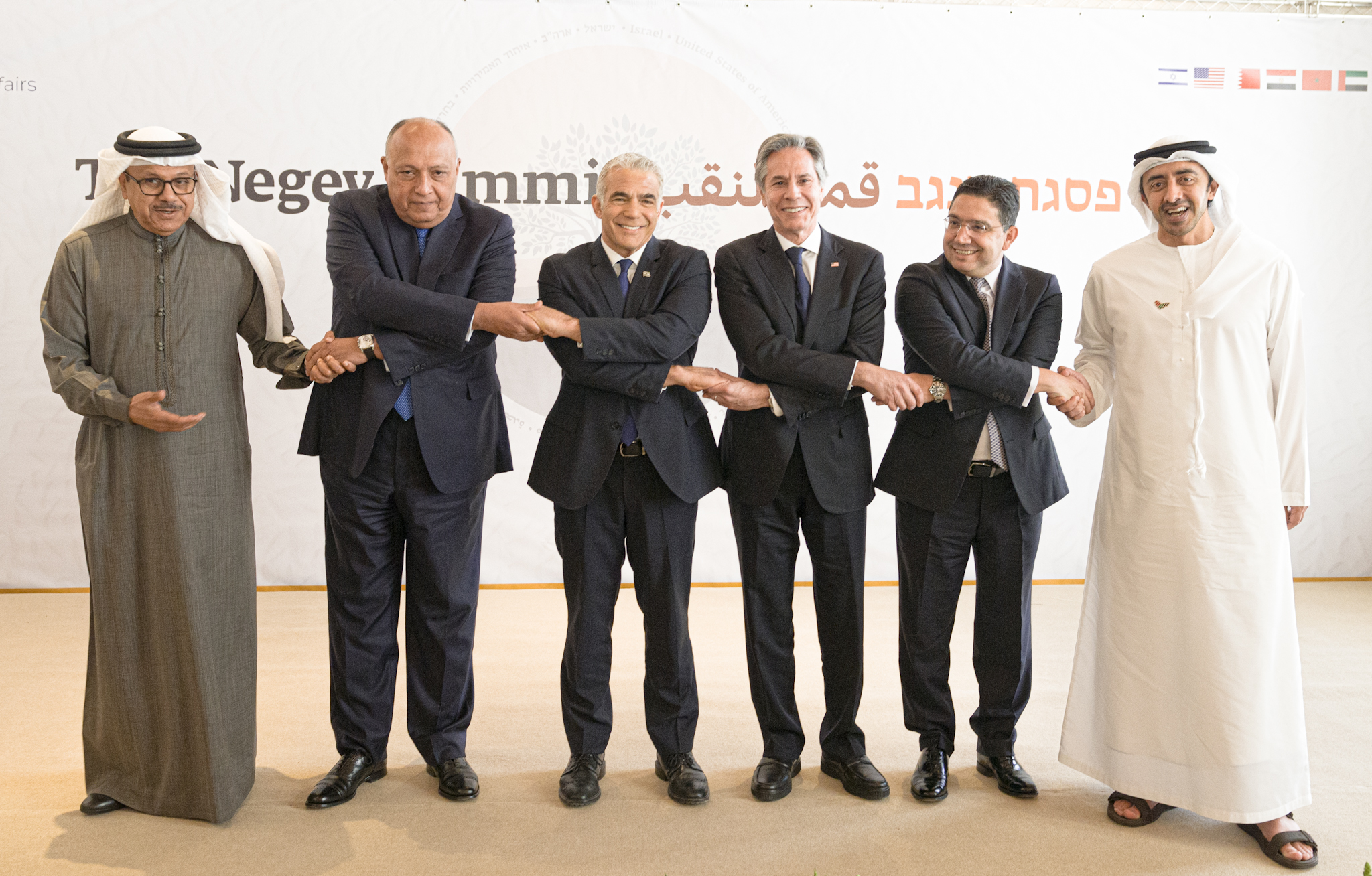
The foreign ministers of the six countries that attended the Summit – from left to right: Abdullatif bin Rashid Al Zayani (Bahrain), Sameh Shoukry (Egypt), Yair Lapid (Israel), Antony Blinken (USA), Nasser Bourita (Morocco), and Abdullah bin Zayed Al Nahyan (United Arab Emirates)

The Negev Summit was a summit that took place on 27–28 March 2022 in Sde Boker, Israel, in which Israeli Foreign Minister Yair Lapid hosted the foreign ministers of Bahrain, Egypt, Morocco and the United Arab Emirates, as well as U.S. Secretary of State Antony Blinken.

The four Arab countries present at the conference were represented by their Foreign Ministers: Abdullah bin Zayed Al Nahyan, Foreign Minister of the United Arab Emirates; Abdullatif bin Rashid Al Zayani, from Bahrain; Nasser Bourita, Minister of Foreign Affairs of Morocco; Sameh Shoukry, Foreign Minister from Egypt.

On March 28, 2022, it was announced that the conference was to become an annual forum, to be called the Negev Forum.

== History ==
The meeting was organized by Foreign Minister Yair Lapid and its primary purpose was to establish an international alliance against the nuclear program of Iran. Initially, the idea was to bring together as many countries as possible from the Abrahamic Accords, in order to strengthen and deepen ties. This is a few days after the Prime Minister of Israel, Naftali Bennett, also visited Egypt. The Jordanian foreign minister was also invited to join the conference, but he held a series of meetings in Kuwait at the time. Jordan and the Palestinian Authority have declined to join the talks.

== Summit ==
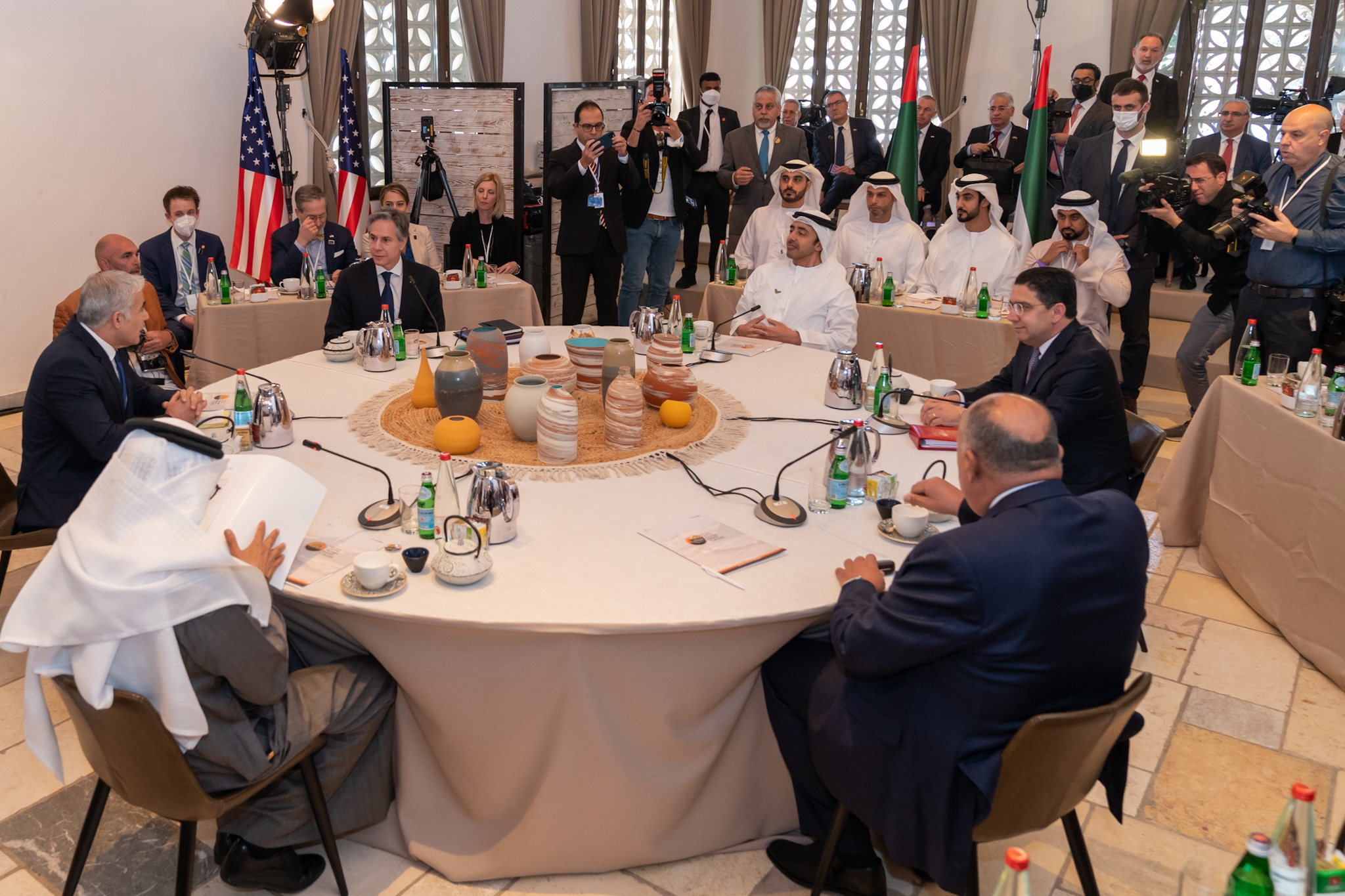
Blinken at Negev Summit

The foreign ministers of Israel, Egypt, Morocco, Bahrain and the United Arab Emirates, and the United States Secretary of State, met at Sde Boker in the Negev, Israel, and decided to hold regular meetings about regional security and commit to further expanding economic and diplomatic cooperation.

The six foreign ministers who participated in the summit decided to set up a number of joint working groups. The first to discuss national security and the war on terror and other working groups will be education, health, energy, tourism, food and water. In addition, the six foreign ministers agreed that each annual (or semi-annual) meeting would convene in a different desert city, to symbolize the issue common to all relevant countries: the need to improve water supply, desert tourism, book settlement localization and food security concerns. Topics raised included wheat prices, the Western Sahara question, piracy in the Red Sea, and dealing with launching UAVs and long-range missiles, in addition raising opposition to the JCPOA nuclear deal with Iran and resisting its proxies.

United States Secretary of State Antony Blinken said that the meeting "could expand the potential for peace and conflict resolution across the region." He also said that he supported a two-state solution for Palestine and criticized the construction of Israeli settlements on disputed territory as well as Palestinian payments to the families of terrorists. Arab government attendees also said that Israel "must make progress on implementing a two-state solution for the Palestinians with East Jerusalem as its capital."

During the summit, an attack took place in Hadera in which two police officers were shot by a pair of Israeli Arabs who had sworn allegiance to ISIS. All summit participants unanimously condemned the attack.
