= Imam Reza Shrine bombing =

1994 anti-Shia terrorist attack in Mashhad, Iran

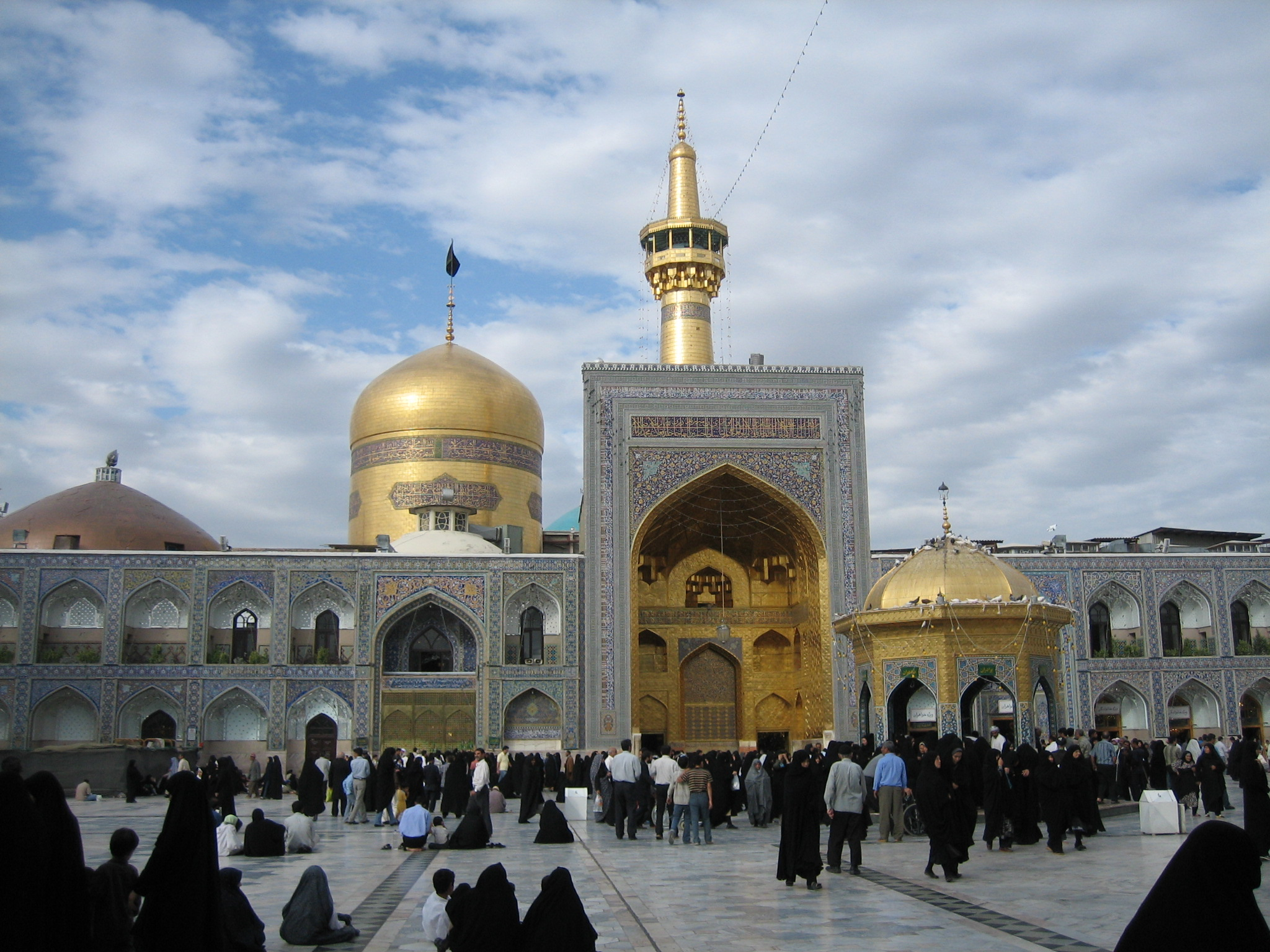
- The Imam Reza Shrine, where the explosion took place
- Location: Mashhad, Iran
- Date: 20 June 1994
- Deaths: 25 or 26
- Injuries: 70 - 200+
- Accused: Ramzi Yousef, Abdul Shakoor, MEK, Al-Haraka al-Islamiya al-Iraniya (Sunni group claiming responsibility)

The Imam Reza Shrine bombing refers to a bomb explosion that occurred on 20 June 1994 in a crowded prayer hall at the shrine of Ali al-Ridha, the eighth Imam of Shia, located in Mashhad, Iran. To maximize the number of casualties, the explosion took place on Ashura, one of the holiest days for Shia Muslims, when hundreds of pilgrims had gathered to commemorate the death of their third Imam, Husayn ibn Ali.

The attack left at least 25 dead and at least 70 injured. (Note: Other estimates range from 200 to nearly 300.) The bomb was equivalent to 4.5 kilograms (10 lb) of TNT, according to experts. Although a Sunni militant group claimed responsibility, agents from the Mujaheddin-e Khalq (MEK) were blamed by Iranian authorities in the bombing, with the explosive device reportedly built by Pakistani bomb-maker Ramzi Yousef. The MEK has consistently denied any involvement in the attack.

== Bombing ==
On 20 June, the shrine was crowded with self-flagellating mourners, celebrating Ashura and commemorating the death of Husayn ibn Ali. At 14:26, a bomb exploded in a crowded prayer hall in the women's section of the shrine. The Independent described it as "the first attack on such a holy place" or "the worst terrorist atrocity in Iran since 1981". In protest, people gathered outside the mosque and hospitals.

Damage included the destruction of one wall and the prayer hall's dome, and the breaking of crystal chandeliers.

== Suspects ==
The Iranian government blamed the People's Mujahedin of Iran (MEK); however, MEK condemned the attack. Ramzi Yousef, a member of al-Qaeda who was responsible for several terrorist attacks worldwide, was also accused of being responsible. According to an anonymous US official, Yousef built the bomb and MEK agents placed it in the shrine. According to the analysts, he was suspected of having connections with MEK because of his Iraqi background. However, Raymond Tanter, a member of the United States National Security Council under President Ronald Reagan, believes that MEK was not involved, and that a Pakistani militant connected to Yousef was the perpetrator. News, A Pakistani daily newspaper, identified that person to be Abdul Shakoor, a young religious radical living in Lyari in Karachi.

Following the bombing, the government arrested several individuals, including a man named Mehdi Nahvi, who they claimed was the operative who physically planted the bomb.

A month after the attack, a Sunni group calling itself Al-Haraka al-Islamiya al-Iraniya claimed responsibility for the attack. Despite this, the Iranian government continued to hold the MEK responsible. According to the National Council of Resistance of Iran, in a trial in November 1999, Interior Minister Abdollah Nouri claimed it was a false flag attack by the Iranian regime to blame MEK.

== Aftermath ==
Strict security measures were applied after this attack, and visitors are now searched before entering the shrine. The event caused further political unrest in Iran.

== Portrayals ==
A 2013 play entitled "the picture of Aziz's event" narrated the life of a woman who was going to visit Imam Reza shrine on the day of the bombing.

== See also ==
- 2006 al-Askari mosque bombing
- 2007 al-Askari mosque bombing
- Imam Reza Shrine stabbings
