= Ginosar =

Kibbutz in northern Israel

Ginosar: גִּנּוֹסַר (Hebrew)
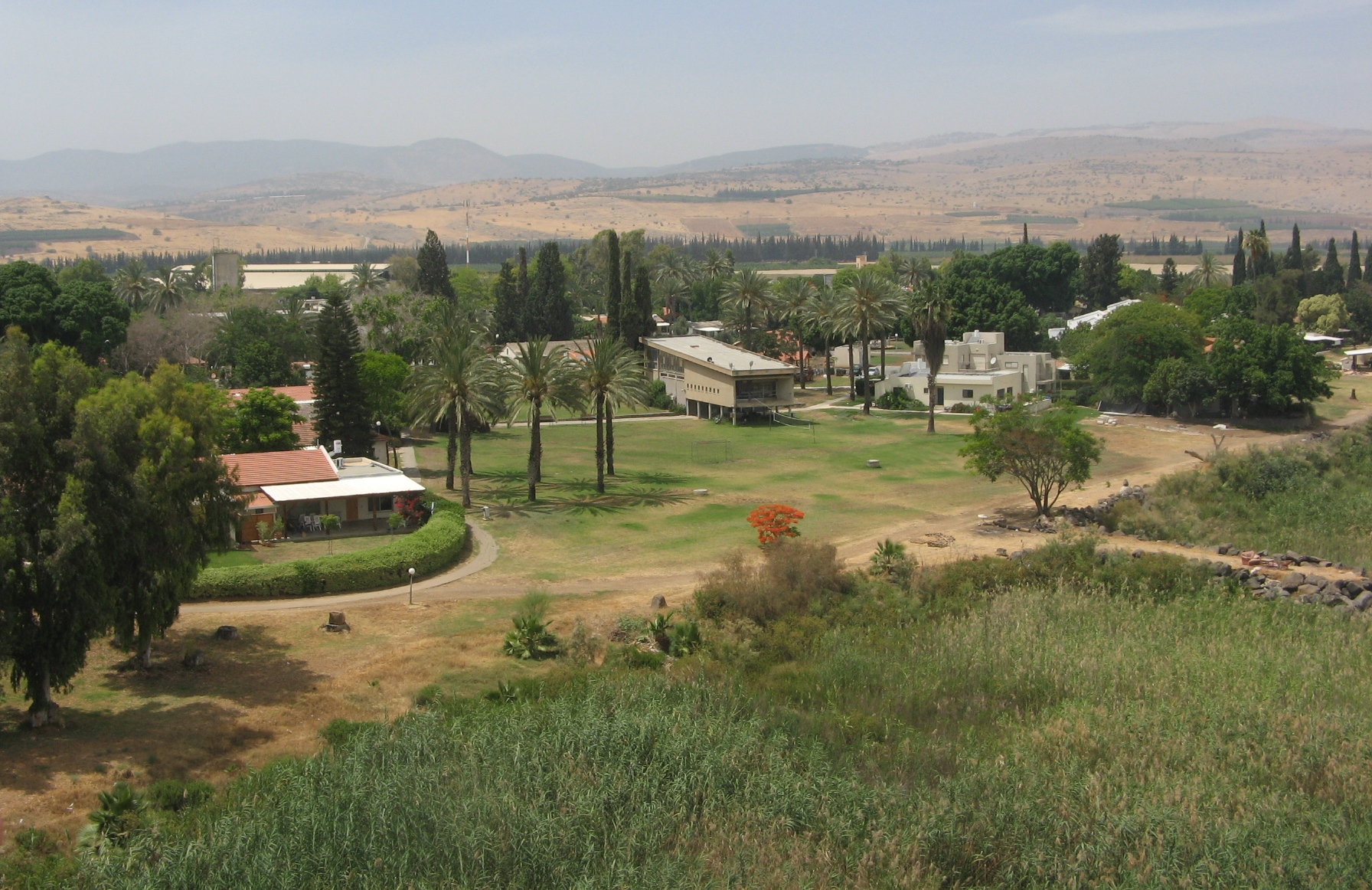
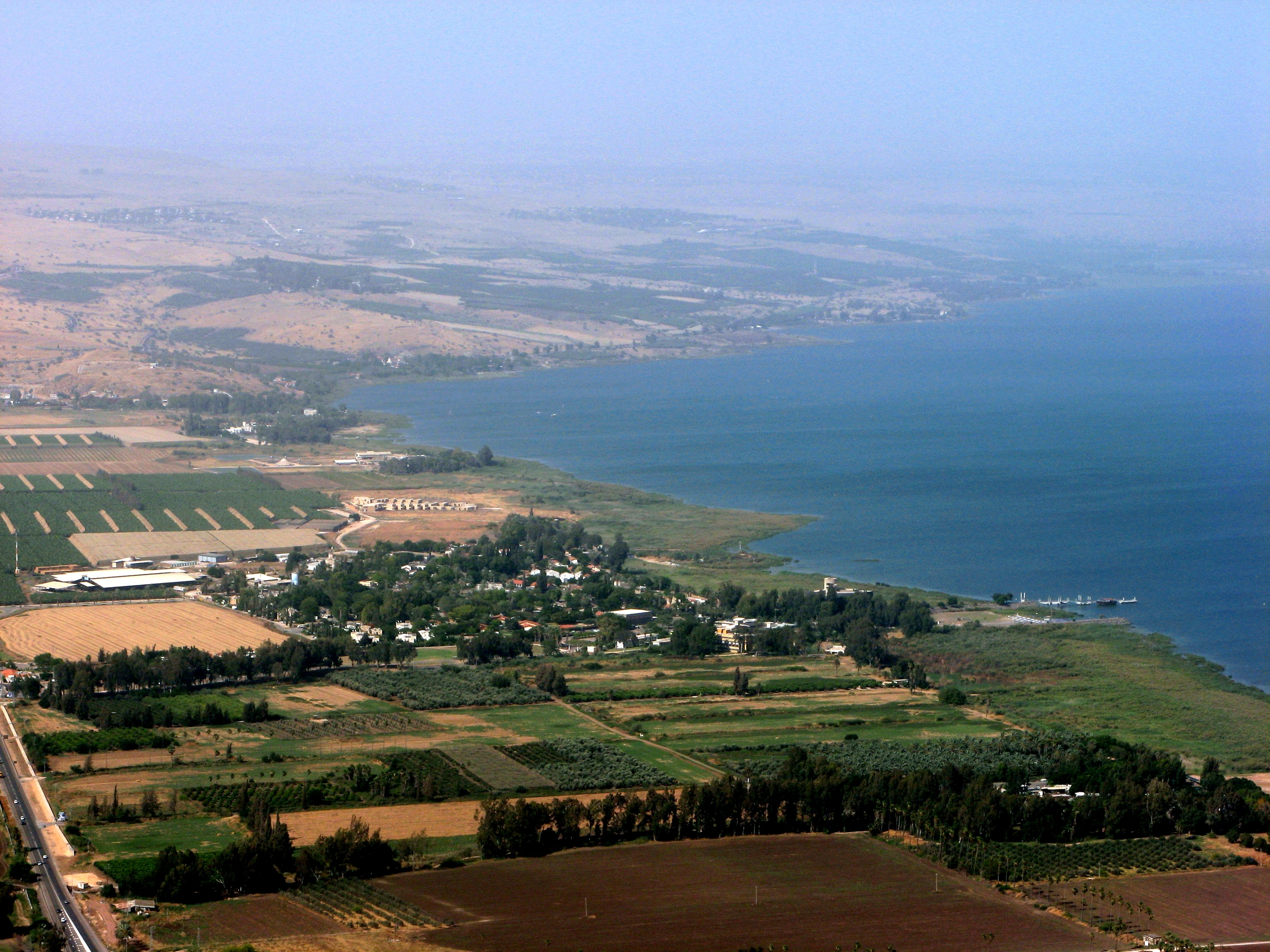
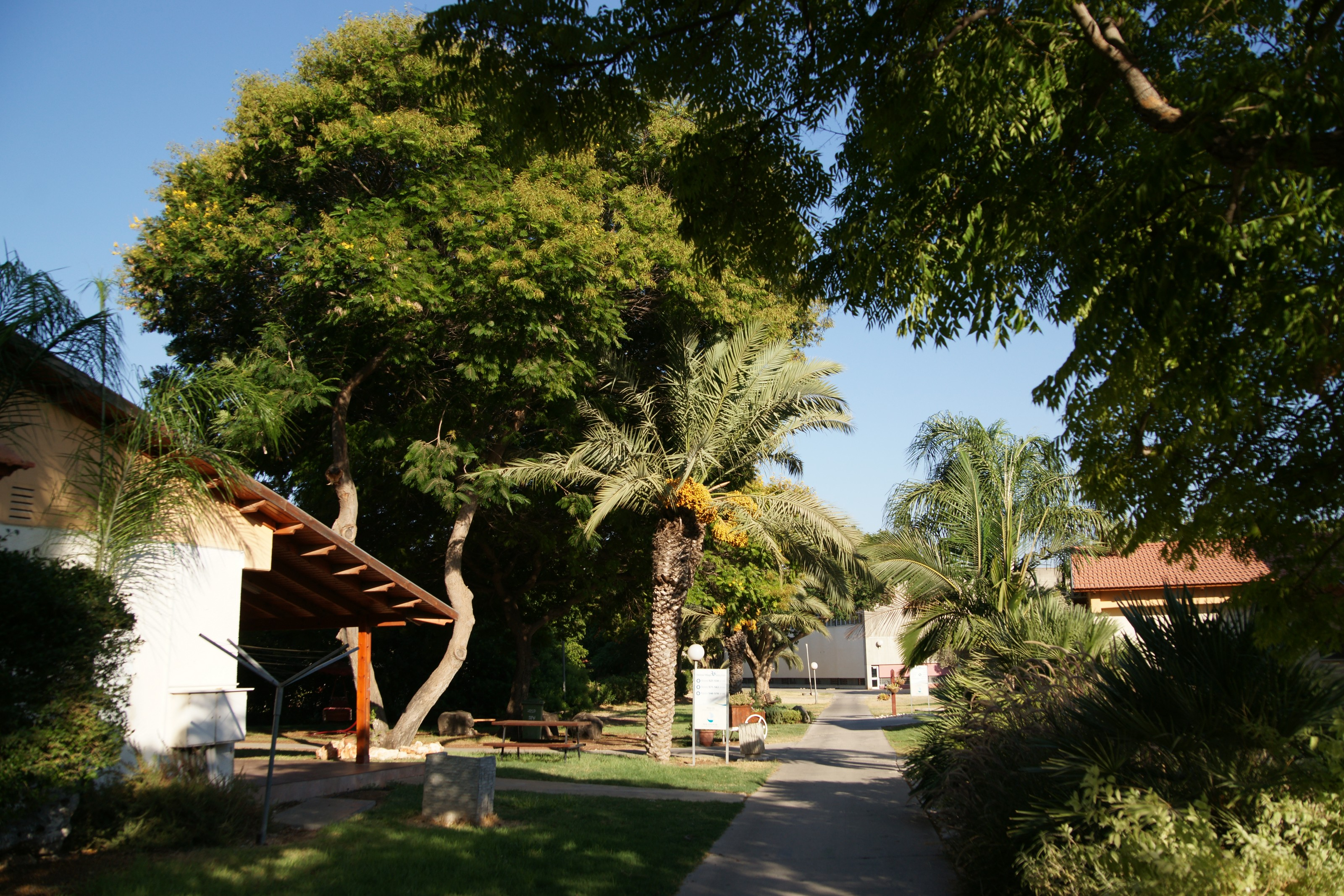
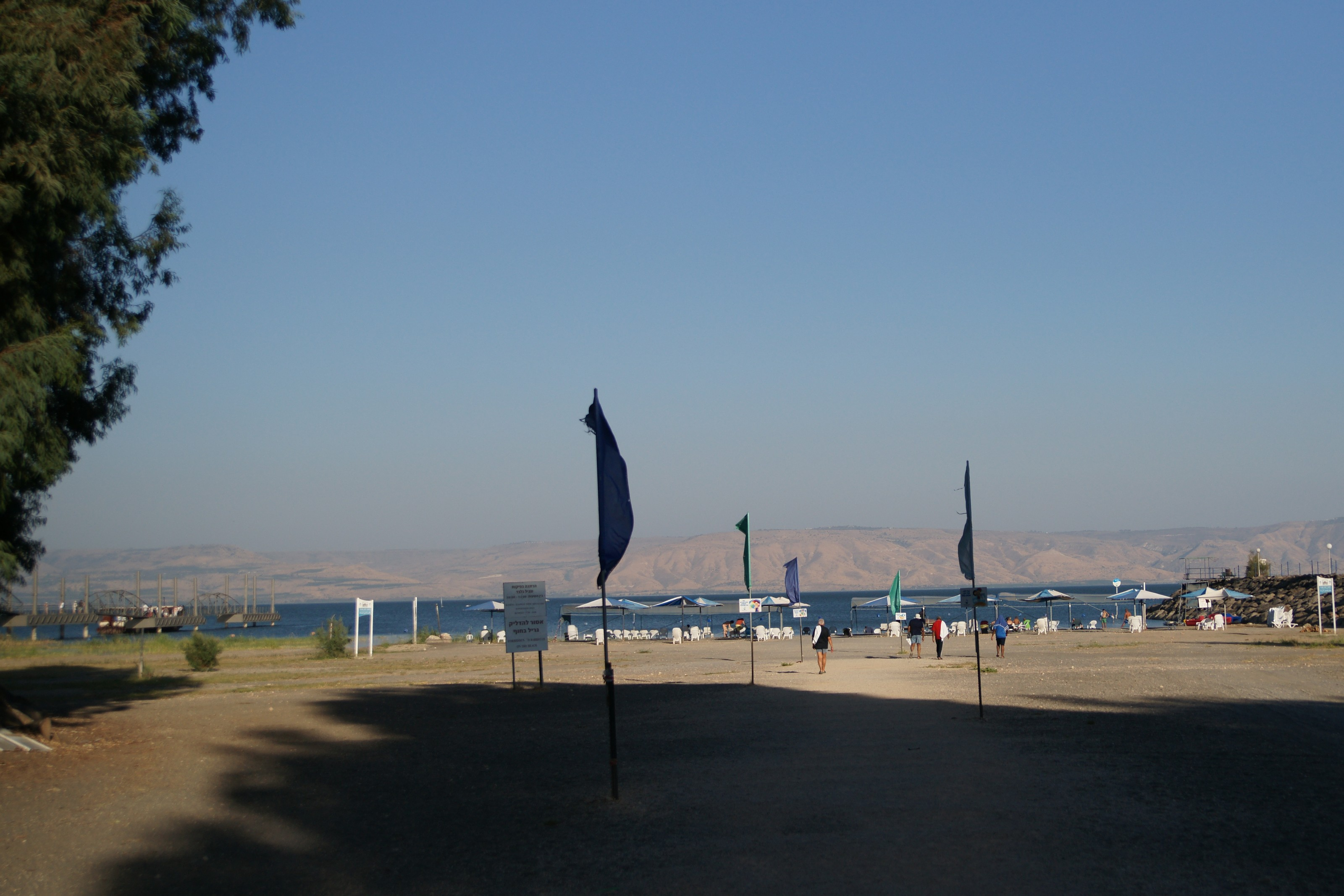
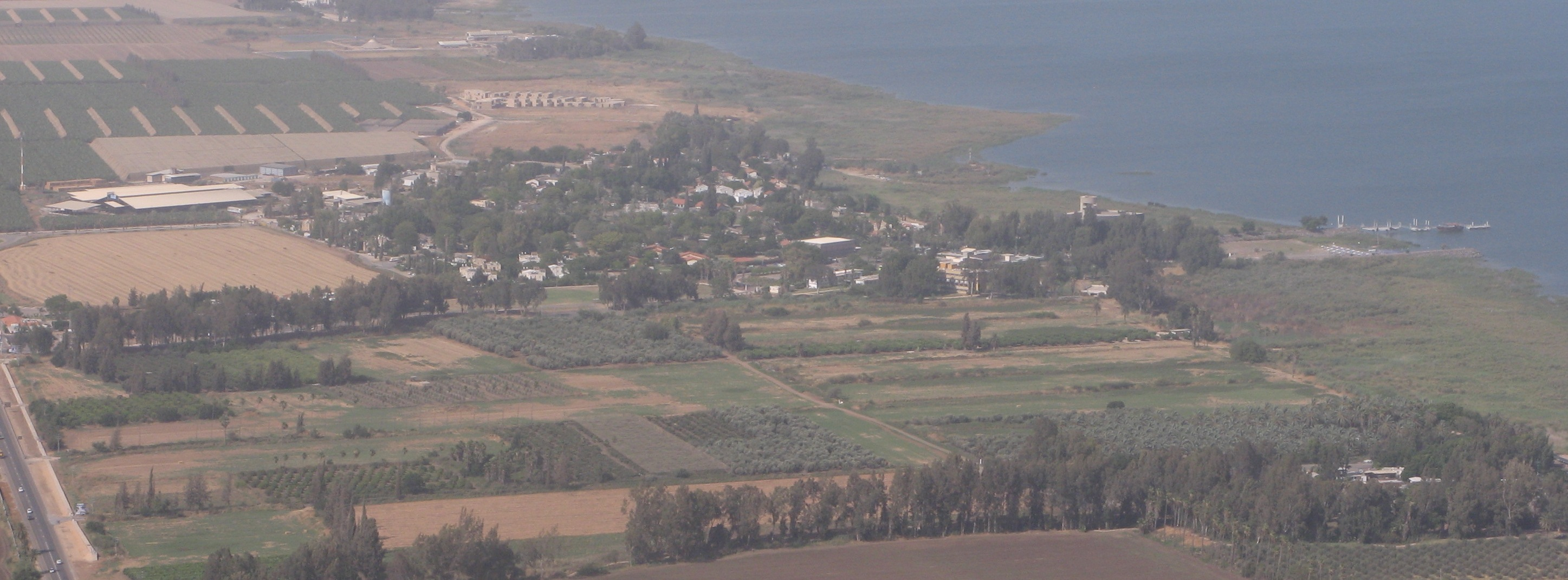

- Location within Northeast Israel Location within Israel
- Coordinates: 32°50′51″N 35°31′22″E
- Country: Israel
- District: Northern
- Subdistrict: Kinneret
- Council: Emek HaYarden
- Affiliation: Kibbutz Movement
- Founded: 25 February 1937
- Founder: Young socialists
- Population (2024): 825
- Website: www.ginosar.org.il

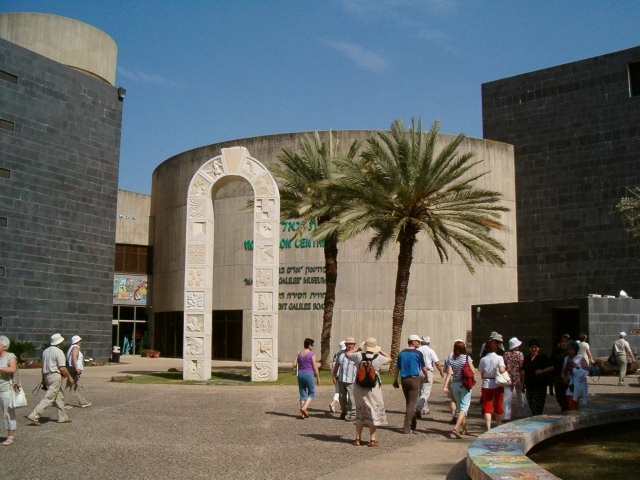
Yigal Allon Museum

Ginosar (Hebrew: גִּנּוֹסַר) is a kibbutz in the Plain of Ginosar on the western shore of the Sea of Galilee in Israel. Located north of Tiberias on Highway 90, it falls under the jurisdiction of Emek HaYarden Regional Council. In 2024 it had a population of 825.

== History ==
=== Roman period ===
In the first century AD there was a flourishing town known by Greek and Latin speakers as Gennesaret, with one single mention in the New Testament (Matthew 14:34), for which but a few papyri use the form "Gennesar". The modern kibbutz takes its name from this ancient town, though it is not located at precisely the same site.

=== British Mandate ===
Ginosar was founded on the eve of Purim in March 1937 by a group of young Socialist Zionists, on Palestine Jewish Colonization Association (PICA) land that had been leased to the settlement of Migdal.

The reason given for "squatting" was that the leased area needed close protection during the "disturbances" (1936–1939 Arab revolt in Palestine). The original was built as a "Tower and Stockade" settlement, was closely aligned with the Mapai party, and was the home of Yigal Allon, commander of the "Syrian Department" of the Palmach, and later a senior minister in the government of Israel.

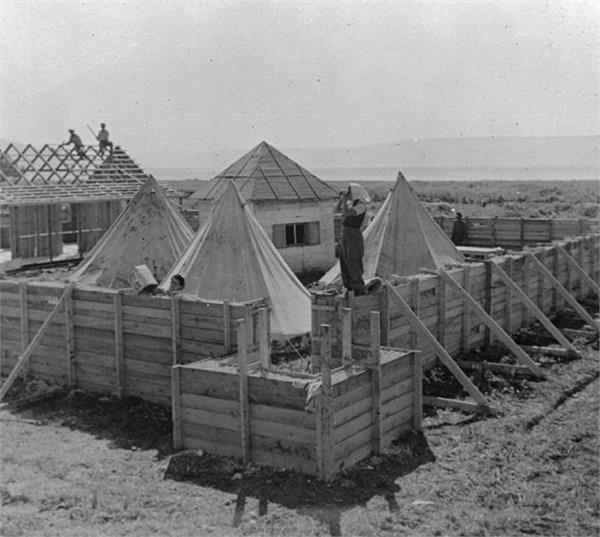
Ginosar1937. "Tower and Stockade" wall under construction

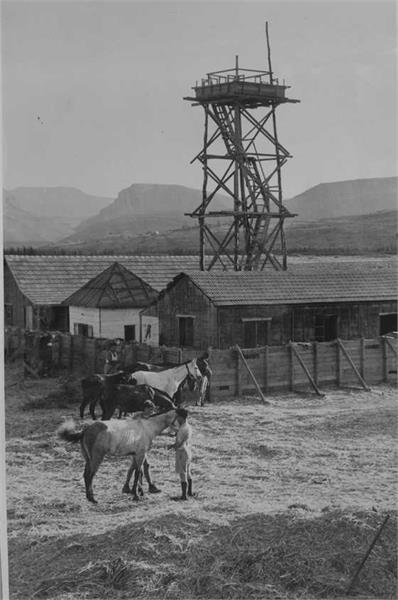
Ginosar 1937. Watchtower under construction

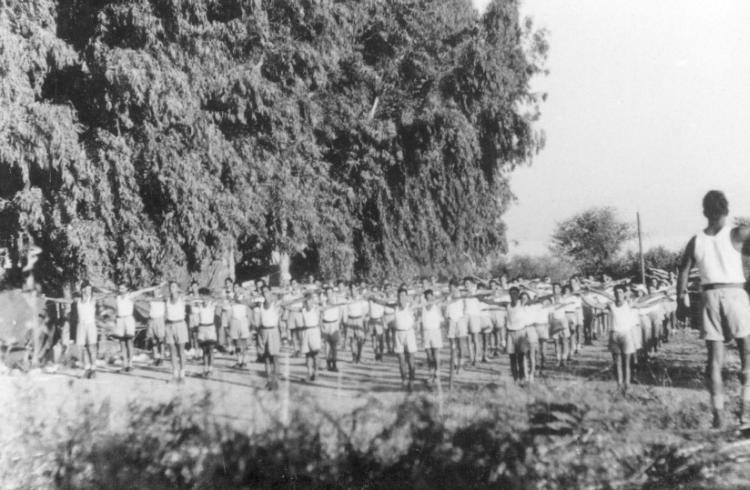
Palmach, 11th Company, doing morning exercises at Ginosar, 1947

=== State of Israel ===
Ginosar was originally an agricultural community; now its primary source of income is from tourism. During a severe drought in 1986 the level of lake dropped to reveal the frame of a fishing boat that has since been carbon dated to 100 BCE to 70 CE, and is now known as the Sea of Galilee Boat. Using innovative techniques the boat frame was rescued, the boat was placed in a special tank, and it is displayed in the Beit Yigal Allon Museum.

== Notable people ==
- Yigal Allon (1918–1980), politician, commander of the Palmach, and general in the IDF
- Barak Lufan (1987-2022), kayaker
