= Hadera attack =

Hadera attack may refer to:

- Hadera bus station suicide bombing, in 1994
- Bat Mitzvah massacre, in 2002
- Hadera Market bombing, in 2005
- 2022 Hadera shooting
- 2024 Hadera stabbing attack
