= Israel Canoe Association =

National governing body for canoeing in Israel

Israel Canoe Association איגוד הקיאקים בישראל
- Sport: Canoeing
- Jurisdiction: Israel
- Affiliation: International Canoe Federation
- Regional affiliation: European Canoe Association
- Headquarters: Tel Aviv, Israel
- President: Meir Barkan
- (Israel)

The Israel Canoe Association (איגוד הקיאקים בישראל) is the national governing body for canoeing in Israel. Its headquarters is in Tel Aviv, Israel.

The Israel Canoe Association is part of the 45-nation European Canoe Association, which was founded in 1993. It is also a member of the International Canoe Federation (ICF).

== History ==
Michael Kolganov, of the Israel Canoe Association, won a bronze medal in the Men's K-1 500 m event at the Sydney Olympics in 2000.

In 2006, Dan Amper retired from his duty as president of the Israel Canoe Association, and was elected an honorary president, continued representing Israel as an ICF official. Amnon Erez (formerly secretary general of the ICA) was elected president of the Israel Canoe Association.

As of 2015, Ronit Shaked was the secretary-general of the Israel Canoe Association. Its president is Giora Astari. From June 2019 the president is Meir Barkan. The secretary general is Gila Ron Sa'ada.
