= 2022 Bougui bombing =

Mass killing in Est Region, Burkina Faso

- Part of Jihadist insurgency in Burkina Faso
- Location: near Bougui, Est Region), Burkina Faso
- Date: December 25, 2022
- Deaths: 10 killed Unknown number of missing
- Injuries: 5
- Perpetrator: Unknown

On December 25, 2022, a bus traveling from Fada N'gourma to the trading town of Kantchari hit a landmine near the village of Bougui, Burkina Faso. Ten people were killed and five were injured.

== Prelude ==
Northern and eastern Burkina Faso have been embroiled in an insurgency by jihadists from neighboring Mali since 2015. Due to poor road connection between rural areas and the main cities of Ouagadougou and Bobo-Dioulasso, the few roads that exist are vital for military operations of the Burkinabe Army. Jihadist groups fighting in these areas often use IEDs and landmines to thwart Burkinabe Army operations, although many attacks hit civilian buses headed to trading towns, big cities, or weekly markets. In October 2022, a landmine on a highway in Bandiagara, Mali killed 11 people and injured over fifty more, and a bombing in Silgadji, Burkina Faso in September killed over 35 people headed to a weekly market.

== Attack ==
On the morning of December 25, the bus was traveling from Fada N'gourma to Kantchari, on the border between Burkina Faso and Niger. Est Region governor Hubert Yameogo stated that the bus hit a landmine near the town of Bougui sometime in the afternoon. Ten people were killed immediately, and five were injured. The Burkinabe government released a statement stating some passengers were still missing. While no group claimed responsibility for the attack, Bougui is located in an area where Jama'at Nasr al-Islam wal Muslimin operates.
