= Aamin Ambulance =

Ambulance service in Mogadishu, Somalia

Aamin Ambulance is a free, 24-hour ambulance service in Mogadishu, Somalia.

== Background ==
Aamin Ambulance was founded by dentist Abdulkadir Abdirahman Adan. Abdulkadir was inspired by Abdul Sattar Edhi, the founder of the Edhi Foundation in Pakistan.

== Organisation and funding ==
Aamin is a volunteer organization which operates a fleet of 10 ambulances in Mogadishu. The ambulances were brought second-hand from Dubai for around $5,000 each, and the World Health Organisation donated two vehicles. Other donations include walkie-talkies from the UNDP and a first aid course from the ICRC in 2016, but most of the funding comes from Somali citizens – medical students and local businessmen – to support operations that cost around $12,000 per month in fuel, salaries and supplies.

Aamin respond to calls ranging from minor injuries and illnesses to terrorist attacks. On October 14, 2017, a truck bomb killed over 300 people in the Hodan district of Mogadishu. Aamin ambulances brought more than 250 injured to hospitals for treatment. Response to any call is made more difficult by the large numbers of road blocks in the city, and by soldiers who block their access and sometimes fire at them. In 2008, an ambulance was destroyed, and the driver and patient killed, by an Ethiopian tank shell.

The organisation is nonetheless well regarded by the Federal Government; HA Hawa Mohamed Hassan of Somalia's Health Ministry has given Aamin an honorary certificate. The government does not fund them, but supports them and encourages other aid agencies to do so as well.
