= Imam Reza Shrine stabbings =

2022 anti-Shia terrorist attack in Mashhad, Iran

Imam Reza shrine stabbings
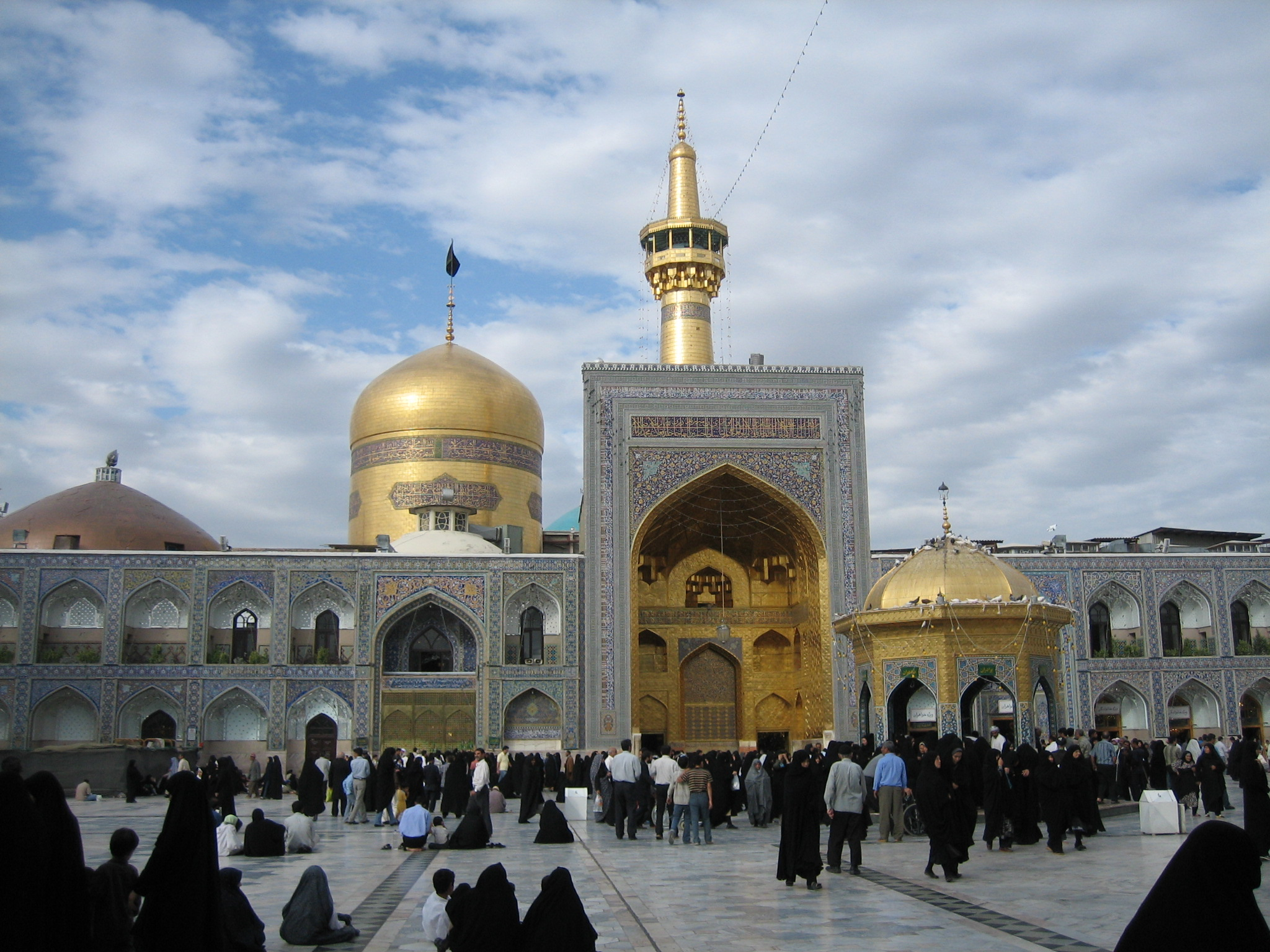
- The Imam Reza Shrine, where the stabbing attack took place
- Location: Imam Reza Shrine, Mashhad, Iran
- Date: 5 April 2022; 14:16 (IRDT, UTC+04:30)
- Target: Shia Muslims
- Attack type: Stabbing
- Weapon: Knife
- Deaths: 2
- Injuries: 1
- Perpetrator: Abdullatif Muradi
- Motive: Anti-Shi'ism

The Imam Reza Shrine stabbings refers to a stabbing attack that took place on 5 April 2022 at the Imam Reza Shrine in Mashhad, Iran, killing two Shia clerics and wounding a third. The perpetrator, identified as foreign national Abdullatif Moradi, was immediately arrested along with six others accused of assisting him. The victims were active members of non-profit constructing and cultural communities, motivated by anti-Shi'ism.

== Attack ==
At 14:16 on 5 April 2022, Abdullatif Moradi walked into the shrine and approached three members of the clergy. He stabbed Mohammad Aslani about 20 times, and Aslani died almost instantly after being stabbed. He stabbed two others, who were hospitalized but reportedly in stable condition. However, one of the injured, a cleric identified as Sadegh Daraee, died of his injuries at the Shahid Kamyab Hospital in Mashhad.

In a video that showed the aftermath of the incident, Shia pilgrims were seen holding Moradi down, after which the authorities took him in custody. Two clergymen were seen splayed on the gray marbled floor of the shrine, covered in blood, in footage shared on social media. Besides Moradi, six people were arrested afterward; two of those were brothers of Moradi.

The attack took place on the third day of the Ramadan, a holy month that attracts Muslim worshippers to communal prayers at mosques from across country.

== Perpetrator ==
The attacker was Abdullatif Moradi, a 21-year-old ethnic Uzbek from Afghanistan, who illegally crossed into Iran in 2021 across the Iran–Pakistan border, and was living around Mashhad. Moradi was called as a "Takfiri who viewed Shia Muslims as heretics and believed their blood should be spilled". Moradi and his brother worked for a transport company in Mashhad. He lived in Mehrabad district of Mashhad and was reportedly active in social networks under the names of "Abdullatif al-Salafi", "Hassan Moradi", and "Abulaqib al-Mowahid", criticizing Shia Muslims and promoting Takfiri thoughts. His "Abdullatif al-Salafi" alias indicates that he was a Salafi. He was executed by hanging in June 2022.

== Funerals ==
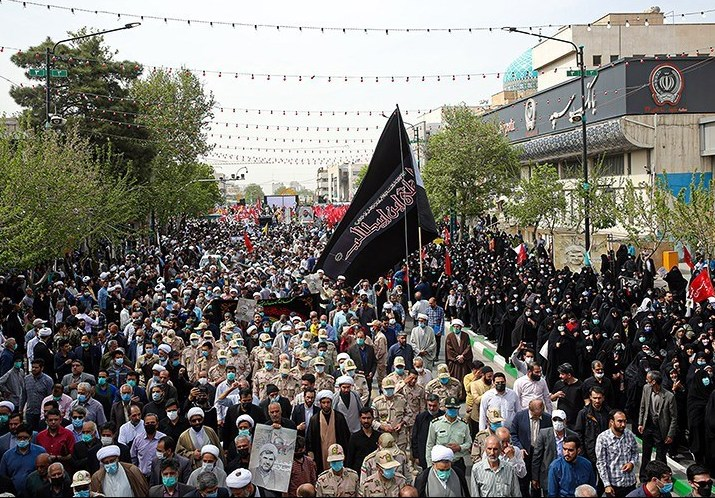
Funeral of Mohammad Aslani

The funeral of Mohammad Aslani was held in Mashhad on 7 April 2022. The participants marched from Shohada Square to the Imam Reza Shrine. The people participating in the funeral shouted "Hossein, Hossein is our slogan", "Labayk ya Imam Reza" and "Death to America". Afghan immigrants also took part in the funeral. Aslani was buried in Imam Reza shrine, beside the victims of the 1994 Ashura bombing incident in Imam Reza shrine.

The funeral for the second victim, Sadegh Daraee, was also held in Mashhad. He was buried near Mohammad Aslani.

== Reactions ==
- Iranian president Ebrahim Raisi condemned the attack and ordered Iran's intelligence ministry to investigate the incident. Sunni scholars from all around Iran also condemned the attack.
- Taliban spokesman Zabiullah Mujahid said that the "Taliban condemns this attack on a place of worship and clerics in Iran. This has nothing to do with Afghans or Afghanistan." Many Afghans also condemned the attack, and called on Iran and Afghanistan to not let the attack cause divisions between them.
- Jamiat-e Islami condemned the attack, blaming the "deviant ideas of Takfiri currents" for causing this "tragic event".

== See also ==
- Imam Reza Shrine bombing
