= 2022 Tel Aviv shooting =

2022 mass shooting in Israel

- Part of the Israeli–Palestinian conflict
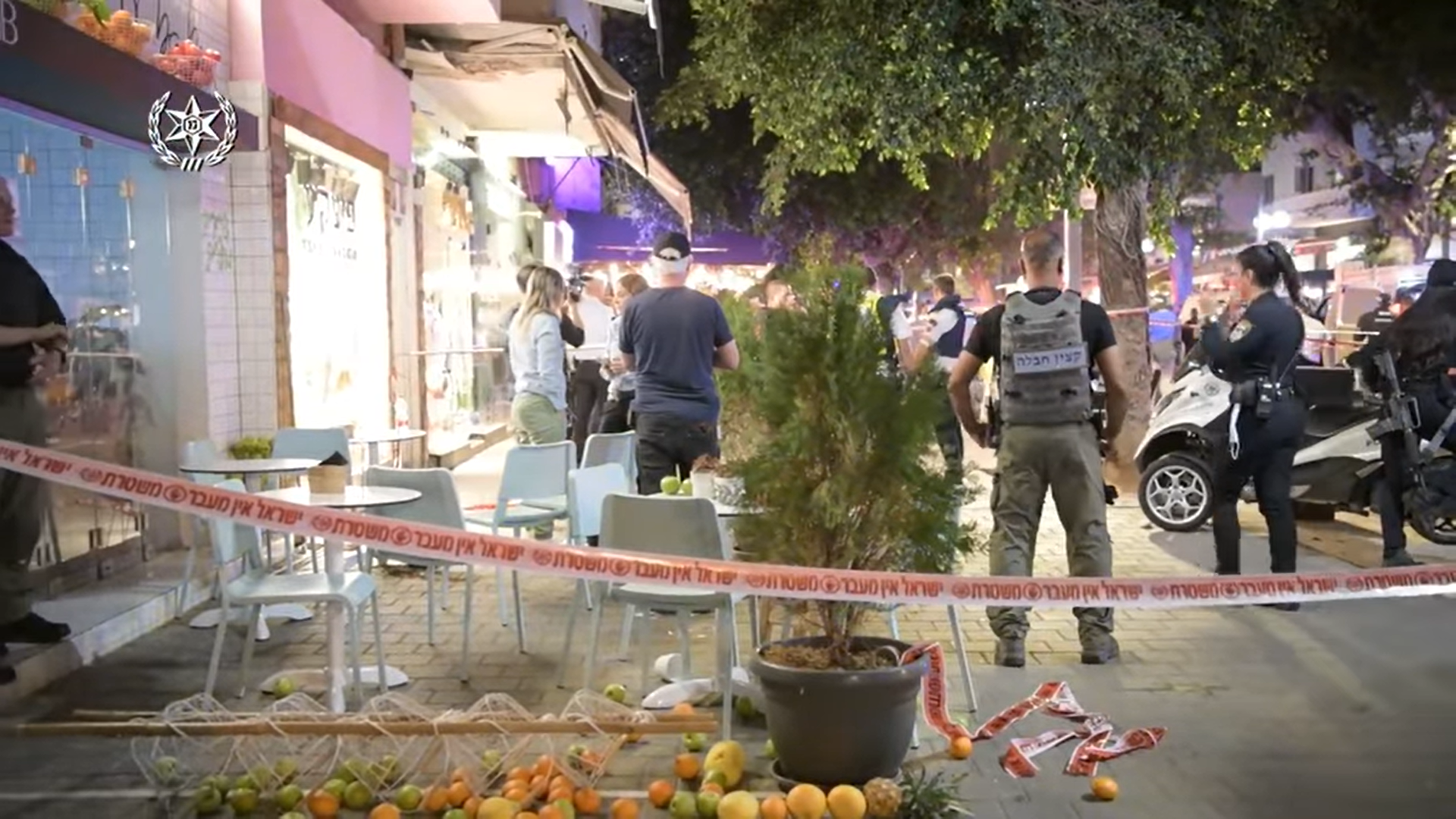
- Crime scene

- The location of Dizengoff Street in Tel Aviv, Israel
- Native name: פיגוע הירי ברחוב דיזנגוף (2022)
- Location: 32°05′01″N 34°46′28″E; Ilka bar, Dizengoff Street, Tel Aviv, Israel
- Date: 7 April 2022
- Attack type: Mass shooting
- Weapon: Pistol
- Deaths: 3 civilians (Note: This figure does not include the shooter, who was shot and killed by police a day later at a different location.)
- Injuries: 6 civilians
- Perpetrator: Raad (or Ra'ad) Fathi Khazem
- Motive: Palestinian political violence

On 7 April 2022, a mass shooting took place on Dizengoff Street in Tel Aviv, Israel. Three Israeli civilians were killed and six were injured.

Raad (or Ra'ad) Fathi Khazem, a 28-year-old Palestinian from Jenin, killed three civilians and injured six.

== Background ==
Three terror attacks occurred in late March, two of which were carried out by Islamic State supporters. A total of 11 people were killed, making it one of the deadliest waves of attacks in the country in recent years. The deadliest of the previous attacks was the drive-by shooting in Bnei Brak.

Three other major attacks have historically taken place in Dizengoff Street. In the 1990s, during the Oslo years following the First Intifada, Hamas suicide bombers killed 22 people in 1994 and 13 people in 1996 in attacks on Dizengoff Street. In 2016, another Islamic State supporter killed three people in a mass shooting.

== Attack ==
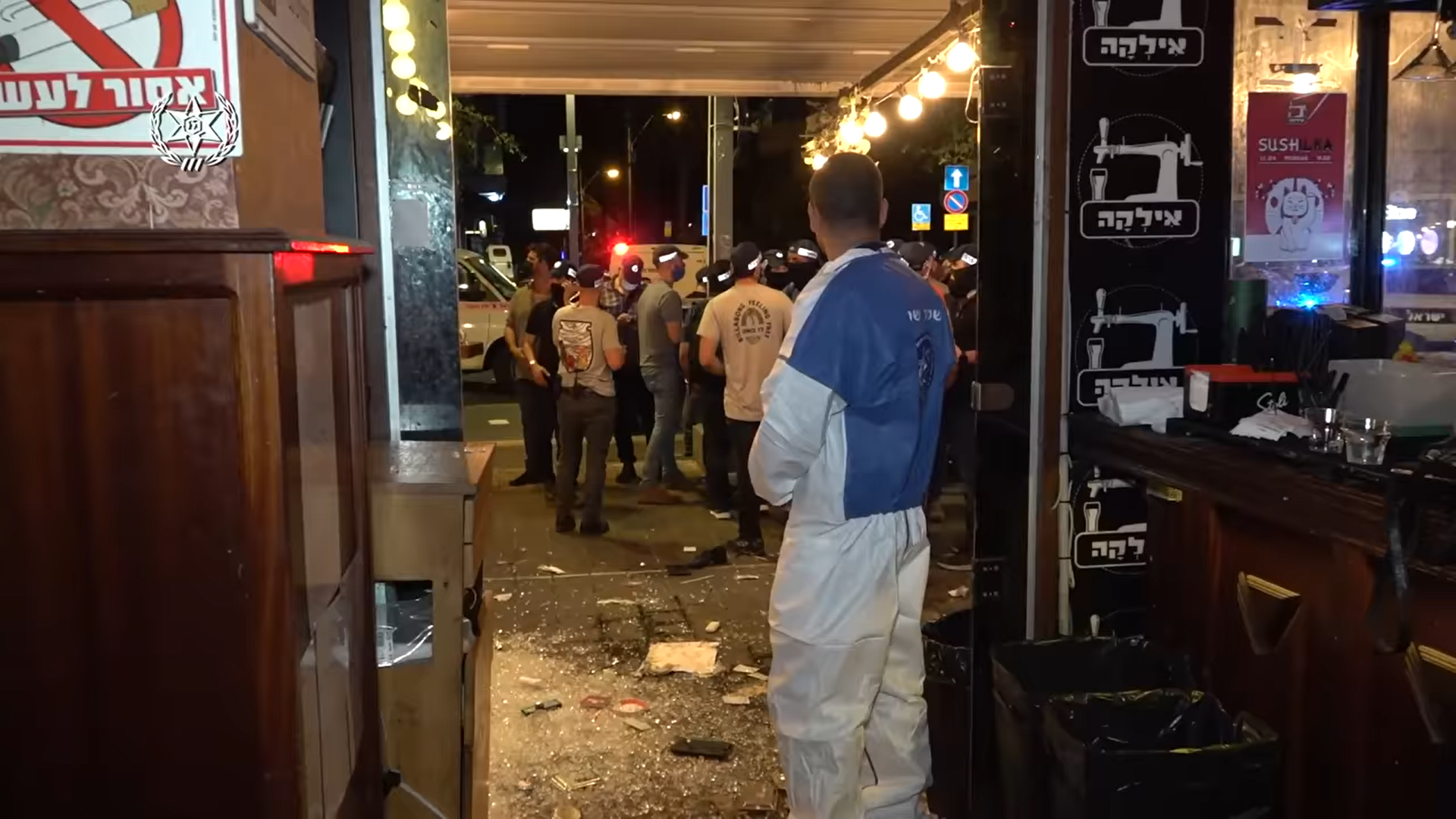
The scene at the Ilka bar after the attack

At around 9:00 p.m., a shooter reportedly clad in black clothing opened fire at three locations on Dizengoff Street, a major street in central Tel Aviv, including at the Ilka Bar. Ten people were transported to Ichilov Hospital. Two of them, both men aged 27, died of their injuries. Six other people were wounded, including three critically. A day later, 35-year-old kayaker Barak Lufan, who was injured during the attack, died due to his wounds, bringing the death toll to three.

The gunman fled on foot and remained at large several hours after the shooting, prompting an extensive manhunt by security forces.

About 1,000 soldiers and police officers participated in the manhunt, including special forces soldiers from the elite Sayeret Matkal, LOTAR Eilat, and Shaldag units. Tel Aviv residents were instructed to remain indoors and keep away from windows and balconies. On the early morning of 8 April, after about nine hours, he was found hiding in a mosque in Jaffa and killed in a gunfight with Shin Bet agents and Israeli police Yamam officers.

== Perpetrator ==
The gunman was identified as Raad Khazem, a 28-year-old Palestinian from Jenin in the northern West Bank. Khazem had prayed at a mosque in Yefet Street before the shootings, which was also where he was later killed. His ties to any militant groups were unclear.

According to information released by the Israel Defense Forces on 10 April, Khazem had previously gotten into a financial dispute with his neighbours in Jenin. Khazem received death threats from his neighbours, who eventually tried to shoot him dead. This led to Khazem acquiring his gun.

His father, Fathi, served as a security officer for the Palestinian Authority and had spent time in Israeli prison in the past.

Khazem's family reacted positively to the news of the attack and praised him as a hero. Raad Khazem's brother, Abed, was killed on 28 September 2022, when their father's home was hit by a missile during an Israeli raid in Jenin. Three other people were also killed during the raid.

== Victims ==
The attacker killed Tomer Morad, Eytam Magini, and Barak Lufan. Morad and Magini, both 27 years old, were from Kfar Saba. Lufan, who was from Giv'at Shmuel, died the day after the attack from his wounds; he was a former Olympian kayaker, having represented Israel in the 2008 Beijing and 2012 London Olympics.

== Aftermath ==
Thousands of Palestinians from the city of Jenin, its neighboring villages and the Jenin refugee camp, went towards the home of the shooter's family in the city to express their support. In addition, "Allahu Akbar" chants, nationalist songs, distribution of sweets, and messages of support for the attacker were heard through the public address system. His father, Fathi Khazem, a retired lieutenant colonel in the national security of the Palestinian Authority, praised the attack carried out by his son.

Palestinian President Mahmoud Abbas condemned "the killing of Israeli civilians", warning that the murder of civilians on both sides would only lead to "a further deterioration of the situation". However, Akram Rajoub, who serves as Abbas' governor in Jenin, praised Hazem as “a Fatah warrior".

Palestinian militant groups such as Hamas did not claim responsibility, but condoned and celebrated the attack, claiming it was the "natural and legitimate response to the escalation of the occupation's crimes against our people, our land, Jerusalem and al-Aqsa Mosque." Islamic Jihad Movement in Palestine echoed Hamas' response, and warned that further "incursions" into al-Aqsa Mosque would only lead to "more resistance and ransom operations."

U.S. ambassador to Israel Tom Nides tweeted that he was "horrified to see another cowardly attack on innocent civilians", and EU Ambassador to Israel Dimiter Tzantchev stated that he was "deeply worried about reports about another terror attack against Israeli civilians". U.S. Secretary of State Antony Blinken also condemned the attack.

Bahrain issued a condemnation of the shooting, which described it as a "terrorist operation."

In response to the attack, the Israel Defense Forces invaded Jenin, raiding Khazem's family home to map it for demolition. Israeli Prime Minister Naftali Bennett granted "all security forces full freedom" of operations in the West Bank. "There are not and will not be limits for this war," Bennett said. "We are granting full freedom of action to the army, the Shin Bet [domestic security agency] and all security forces in order to defeat the terror."

On 9 April, the IDF killed a Palestinian man belonging to Islamic Jihad. According to local authorities the operation also wounded 13 others, including a 19-year-old woman with a bullet to her stomach. Israel deployed additional engineering troops to the "seam zone" with the West Bank in order to patch holes in the security barrier.

== See also ==
- Timeline of the Israeli–Palestinian conflict in 2022
