= Dizengoff Street =

Street in Tel Aviv

Coordinates: 32°4′49.94″N 34°46′25.56″E

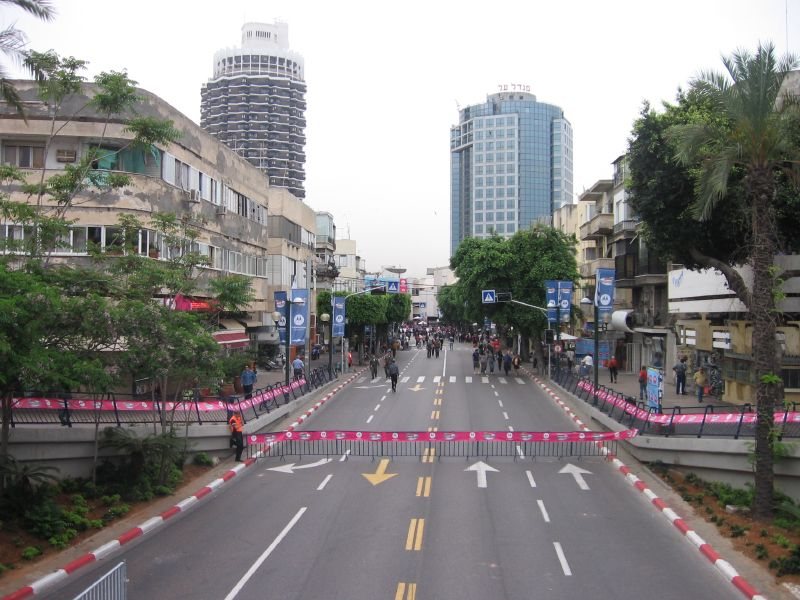
Dizengoff Street in 2006 before a street party.

Dizengoff Street (Hebrew: רחוב דיזנגוף, Rehov Dizengoff) is a major street in central Tel Aviv, named after Tel Aviv's first mayor, Meir Dizengoff.

The street runs from the corner of Ibn Gabirol Street in its southernmost point to the port area of Tel Aviv in its northwestern point. Dizengoff Street is one of the most important streets in Tel Aviv, and has played an essential role in the development of the city. Since the 1970s, Dizengoff Street has suffered urban decay.

== History ==
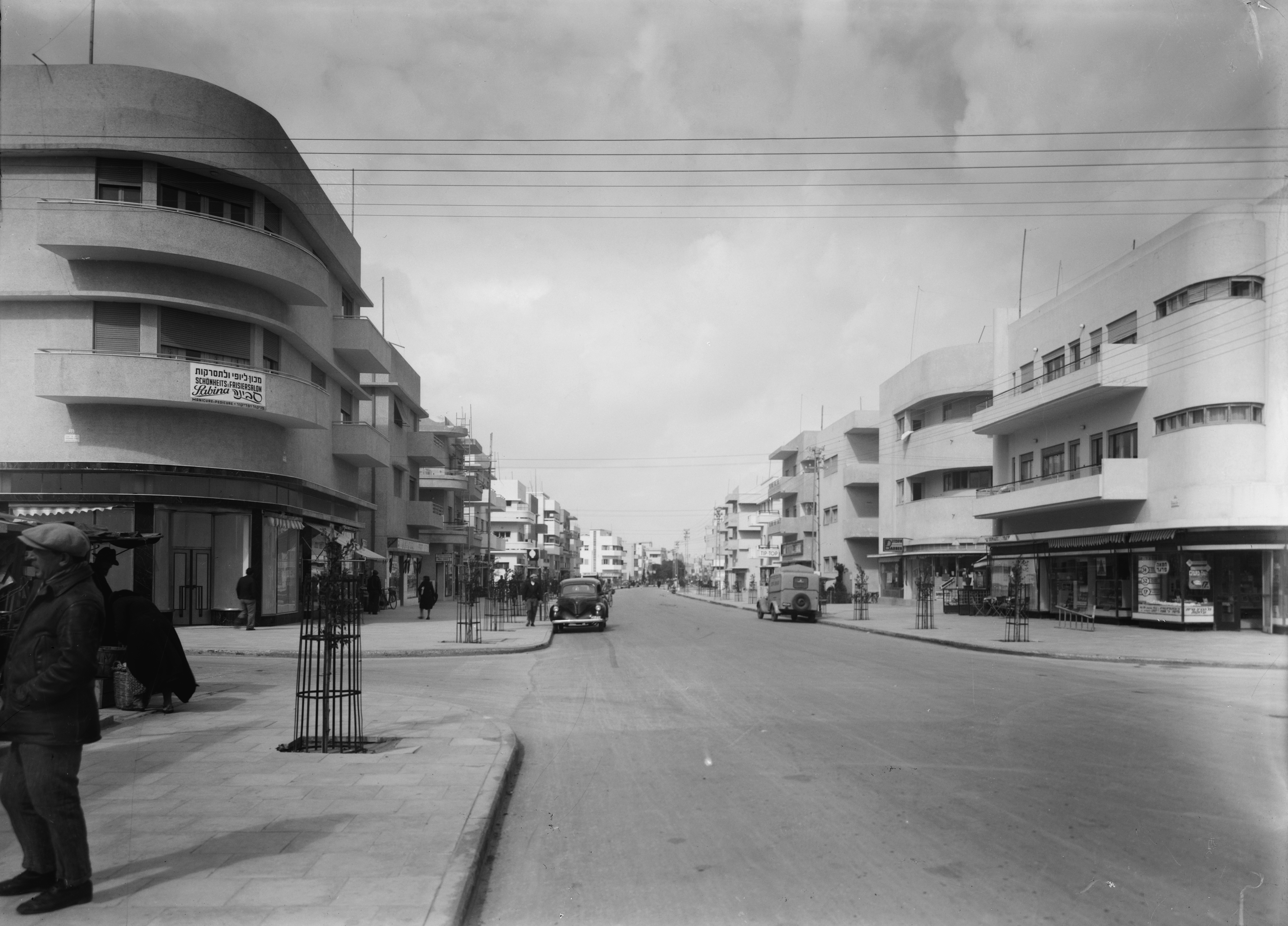
The street in the 1930s

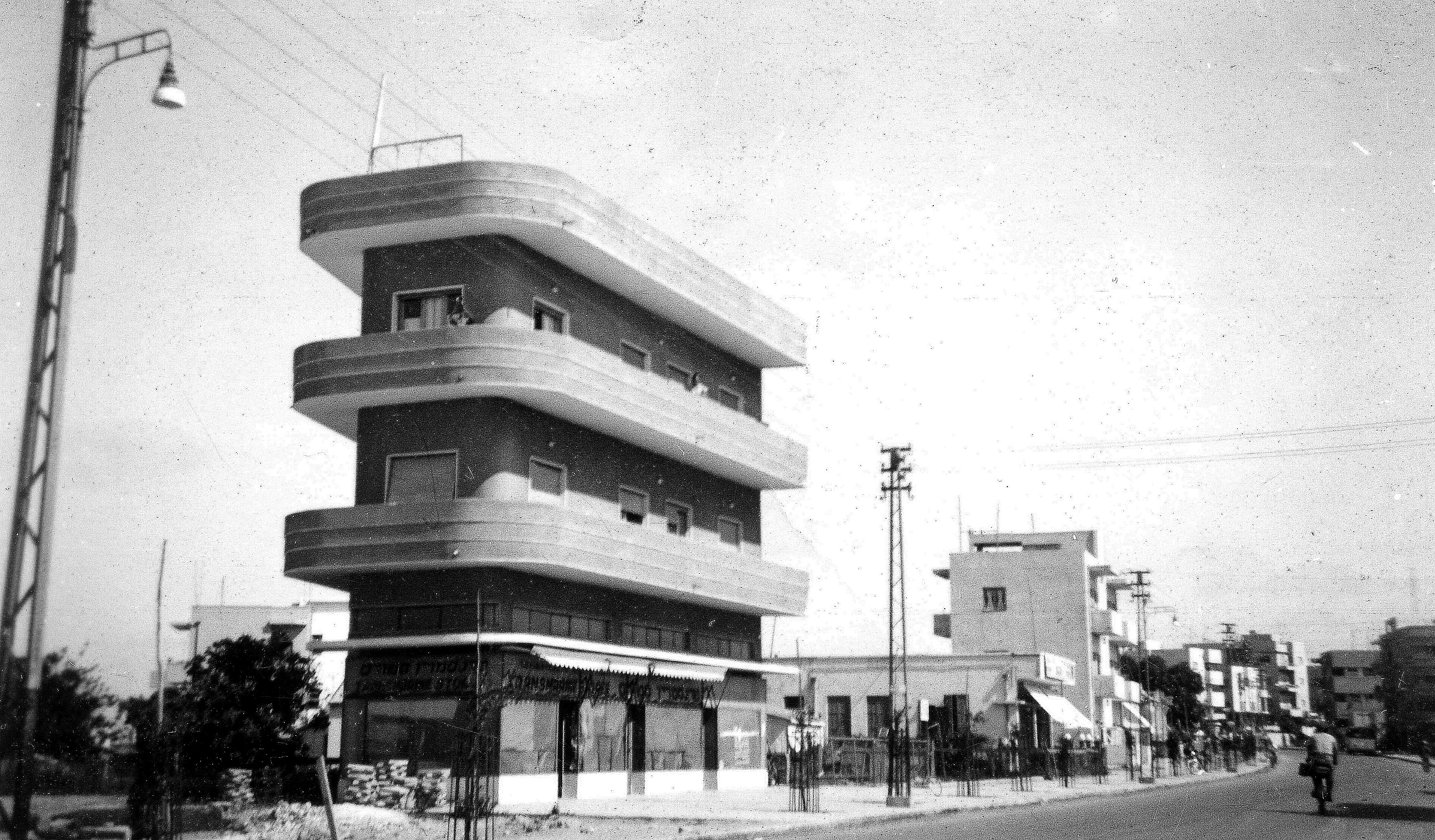
Sadkin house. Dizengoff Street 332 (1939).

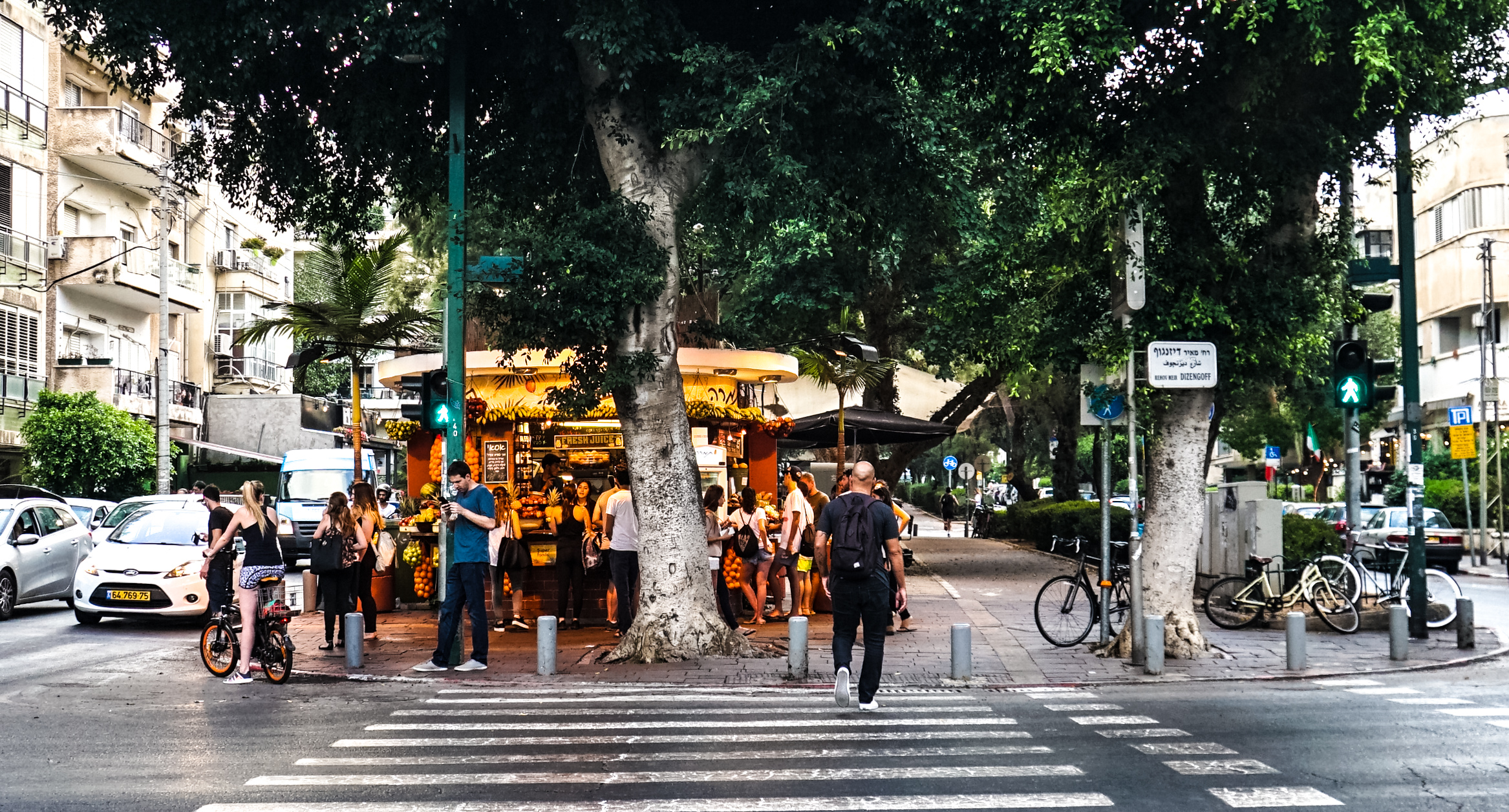
The interchange of Dizengoff and Ben Gurion streets

In the street's heyday, it was described as the "Champs-Élysées of Tel Aviv". In Hebrew slang, a new word was coined based on the iconic status of this street: "l'hizdangef" (Hebrew: להזדנגף), literally "to Dizengoff oneself, ie., to stroll down Dizengoff." Since the 1970s, Dizengoff Street has suffered urban decay. The advent of the shopping mall, Dizengoff Center is cited as a principal reason for the decline, along with changes in the configuration of Dizengoff Square.

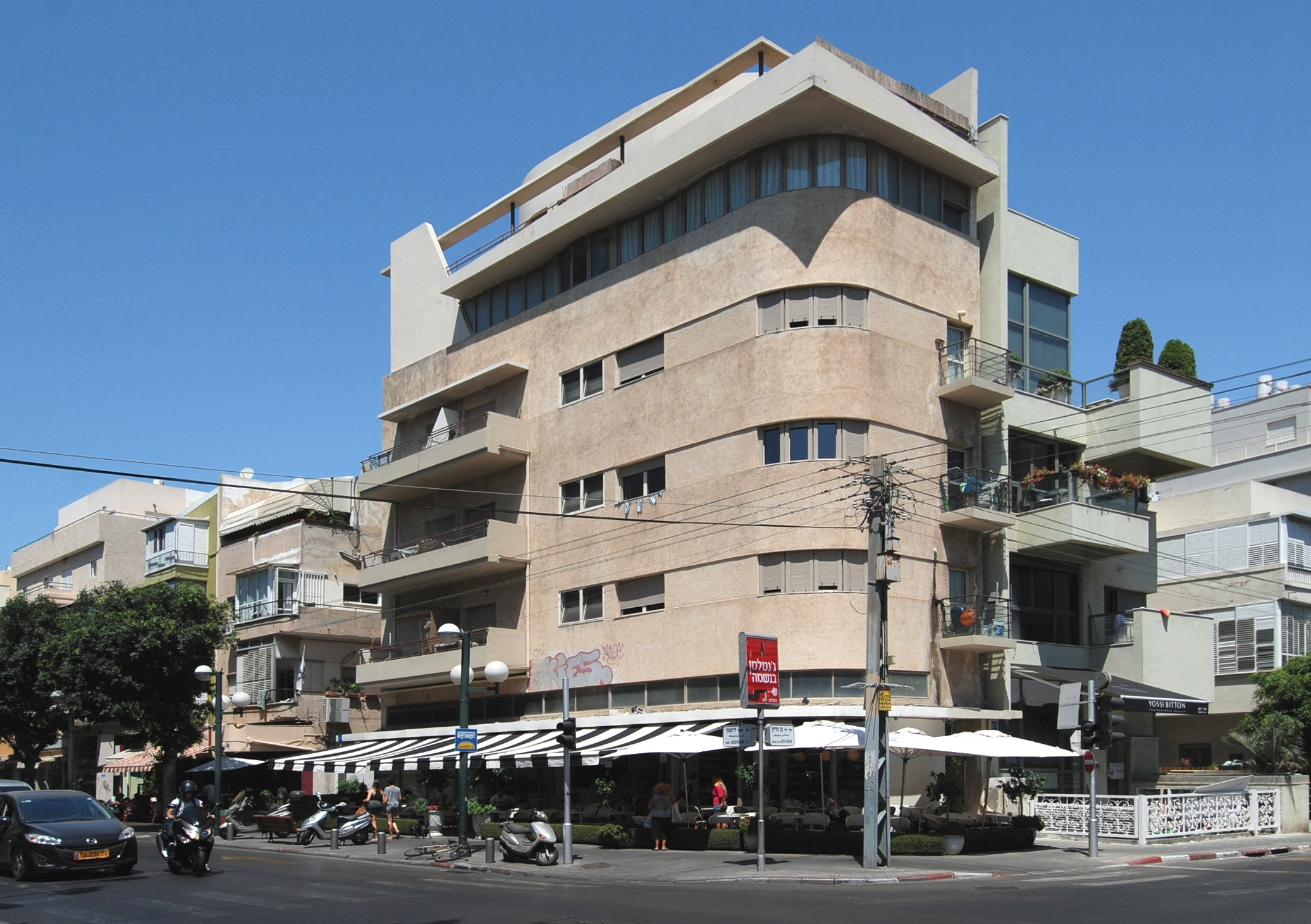
An International style building on Dizengoff Street at the corner of Ben Gurion Blvd., in the White City.

The stretch of Dizengoff Street northward to Dizengoff Square was once very upscale but has since declined. North of Dizengoff Square, the street still has better and more upscale shops, filled with designer name stores, especially towards Basel Street. The street is still full of coffee shops and clothes stores, in addition to a large number of bridal clothing stores. Towards the southern end of the street is the landmark Dizengoff Square and Dizengoff Center shopping mall.

A Hamas suicide bus bombing killed 23 people on 19 October 1994. An Islamist mass shooting killed three people on 1 January 2016. On 7 April 2022, three people were killed in another shooting. On 9 March 2023, three people were shot by a Hamas gunman.

== In popular culture ==
=== Film ===
The film Dizengoff 99 (1979), which has become an Israeli cult classic, describes the way of life around the street and how it changed over the years.

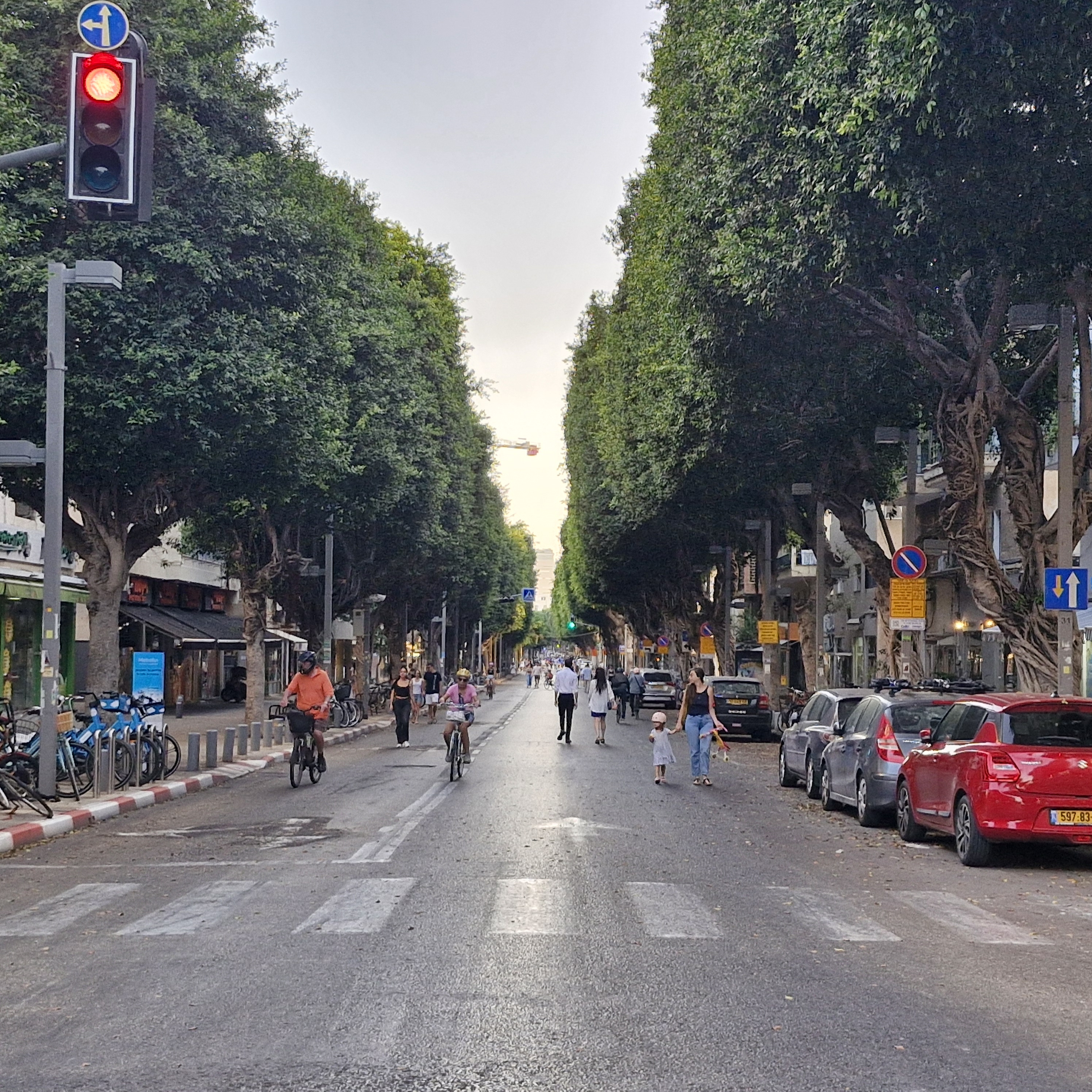
Israelis cycle and walk on Dizengoff during Yom Kippur, a holy day for Jews in which cars aren't used.

== See also ==
- List of leading shopping streets and districts by city
