= Siege of the Villa Rossa Hotel =

2022 attack in Mogadishu, Somalia

- Part of Somali Civil War (2009–present)
Date	27–28 November 2022
Location	Villa Rays Hotel, Mogadishu, Somalia
Result	Somali victory

Belligerents
Somalia	al-Shabaab

Casualties and losses
1 Somali soldier killed 5 soldiers injured	6 fighters killed
- 8 civilians killed

On November 27, 2022, militants from Al-Shabaab stormed the Villa Rossa Hotel in Mogadishu, Somalia, holing themselves up in the facility until Somali forces recaptured it.

== Background ==
In 2006, about 15 years after the Somali Civil War began, jihadist group al-Shabaab began an insurgency in an attempt to overthrow the Somali government and impose an extreme interpretation of Sharia. They often attack hotels; they have attacked the country's capital Mogadishu many times. The Islamist group's most deadly attack was a truck bombing in October 2017 which killed over 500 people, and their most recent attack was a double car bombing on 29 October 2022.

The Villa Rossa hotel is located close to the Somali Presidential Palace, in a heavily guarded area of Mogadishu. Inside the hotel is a restaurant, which is frequented often by government officials. In May 2022, Hassan Sheikh Mohamud was elected, and due to his heavy anti-al-Shabaab stance, the militant group increased attacks against Mogadishu and the Somali government. In August, al-Shabaab attacked the Hayat Hotel in Mogadishu, sparking a 30-hour long siege that killed over twenty people. Similarly, an attack on the Tawakal Hotel in Kismayo on October 23 by al-Shabaab was repulsed.

== Siege ==
According to onlookers, at the time of the attack, some government and security officials were dining in the hotel. The terrorist attack began at 8:05 pm with a suicide bombing, where the bomber drove an explosives-laden car into the Jilacow Cawe high-security prison. Around two minutes after the blast, six al-Shabaab militants stormed the hotel and surrounding buildings. al-Shabaab confirmed via their radio frequencies that they were committing the attack. Two Somali special forces units, the CIA-trained Gaashaan unit and Turkish-trained Haramad unit led efforts to expel the attackers. Some police officers in the night entered the hotel, and battles took place on the different floors. Government officials inside the building climbed out of windows to escape, and civilians were evacuated although not all could make it out. The militants shot up the hotel, and witnesses reported intense fire and some explosions. Environmental Minister Adam Aw Hirsi, speaking to Reuters, stated that "bullets rained everywhere", and people in the hotel scrambled for the exit. Around sixty civilians were rescued from the hotel during the attack.

al-Shabaab was in control of the hotel the entire night, and by the following morning, gunshots were still being heard in the surrounding area and police officers were attempting to launch a counter-operation to expel the attackers. By the morning, the remaining al-Shabaab gunmen were holed up in a hotel room, and died in battle. The siege ended on November 27 with Somali forces recapturing the hotel, after 20 hours of fighting.

== Aftermath ==
In an attempt to leave the hotel, Somali Minister of Internal Security Mohamed Ahmed Ali Doodishe broke his leg. The Environmental Minister Adam Aw Hirsi, who was at the hotel at the time of the attack, survived with no injuries. Two other politicians, Fisheries Minister Abdilahi Bidhan Warsame and Senator Dunia Mohamed both escaped. Security officials and Somali politicians after the attack expressed confusion as to how the militants were able to storm the hotel, as the area is extremely high-security. A meeting between ministers of parliament was cancelled on November 28 due to the attack.

After the attack, the Somali government launched an offensive in the town of Mahaday, Middle Shabelle, killing 40 al-Shabaab fighters. The offensive was in retribution for the Villa Rossa attack.

=== Reactions ===
The African Union condemned the attack.

=== Casualties ===
Eight civilians were killed in the siege, along with one Somali soldier, and five al-Shabaab fighters. Two of the civilians killed were British citizens.

Five Somali soldiers were injured in the fighting.

== See also ==
- 2022 timeline of the Somali Civil War
