= 2022 Somali Ministry of Education bombings =

Double car bombing attack in Somalia

Somali Ministry of Education bombings
- Part of the Somali Civil War
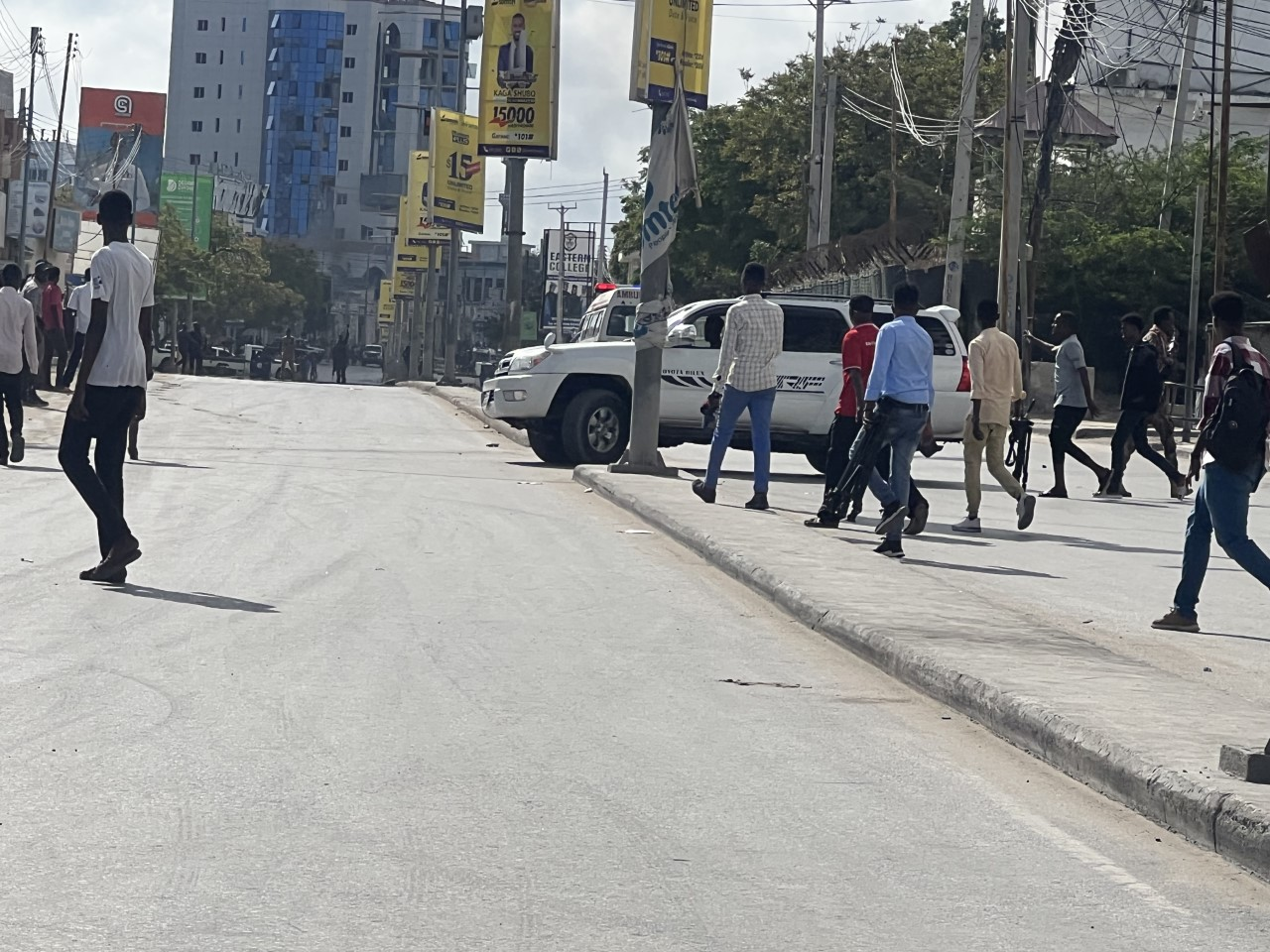
- People reacting to the blast immediately after the bombing

- 2022 Somali Ministry of Education bombings (Somalia)
- Location: 2°1′57″N 45°18′21″E; Mogadishu, Somalia
- Date: 29 October 2022 c. 14:00 EAT (UTC+3)
- Target: Ministry of Education
- Attack type: Car bombings
- Deaths: 121+
- Injuries: 350+
- Perpetrator: Al-Shabaab

On 29 October 2022, 121 people were killed and over 300 were injured by a double car bombing in Somalia's capital, Mogadishu. President Hassan Sheikh Mohamud accused Sunni jihadist group al-Shabaab of carrying out the attacks, which they admitted. The bombing marks the deadliest attack in Somalia since the 14 October 2017 Mogadishu bombings at the same junction.

== Background ==
Al-Shabaab are a Somali Salafi jihadist group who began their insurgency in 2006. They frequently carry out attacks in Somalia, as well as less often in Ethiopia, Kenya, and Uganda. In August 2022, al-Shabaab attacked a hotel in Mogadishu, killing 21 people. Afterwards, President Hassan Sheikh Mohamud said that he would wage an "all-out war" on al-Shabaab. On 23 October 2022, the militant group killed eight people at a hotel in Kismayo. The bombings in Mogadishu occurred on a day when the president, prime minister, and other senior officials discussed combating al-Shabaab and days after Somali officials announced gains in its high-profile offensive against the extremists.

== Bombings ==
At 14:00, the first explosion struck the country's Education Ministry, near Zobe junction and a school. The junction was the site of a deadlier bombing in October 2017. The explosion was followed by a large column of smoke. A second explosion occurred minutes later when ambulances arrived at the site of the first explosion. The second explosion occurred during the busy lunchtime hours outside a restaurant. Both explosions shattered the windows of nearby buildings. Soon after the bombings, gunfire at the nearby Education Ministry was reported.

The founder of Aamin Ambulance said that the second explosion destroyed an ambulance as it came to transport casualties. One driver and a first aid worker were injured. Many civilians on public transport were killed. Some of the injured were treated at Erdoğan Hospital. At Medina Hospital, at least 30 bodies arrived where relatives could identify them. The Somali Journalists Syndicate said that a television reporter was among those killed by the second explosion. A Somali reporter for the Voice of America and a Reuters photojournalist were injured.

== Aftermath ==
After a visit to the affected area, Hassan Sheikh Mohamud said: "Our people who were massacred ... included mothers with their children in their arms, fathers who had medical conditions, students who were sent to study, businessmen who were struggling with the lives of their families." Although no organization at the time admitted carrying out the attacks, he accused al-Shabaab, an Islamist militant group that typically does not claim responsibility for mass casualty events, of being responsible for the bombings. He asked the international community for medical supplies and doctors, appealed to the public to donate blood at hospitals and promised free education to the victims' children and children of past al-Shabaab attacks. He also ordered the government to provide emergency medical treatment to the injured.

On 1 November, al-Shabaab claimed responsibility for the attack, saying the educational ministry was an "enemy base" receiving support from non-Muslim nations. The organization attacked because they believed that Somali children were "being taught from a Christian-led education syllabus."

== International reactions ==
=== International organizations ===
The African Union condemned the attacks and stressed the "critical importance" of the "ongoing military offensive to further degrade al-Shabaab". The United Nations Mission in Somalia tweeted its condolences and condemned the "vicious attack".

Muleya Mwananyanda, Amnesty International's Director for East and Southern Africa condemned the attack on civilians writing, "Al-Shabaab’s callous actions are crimes under international law and it is absolutely crucial that all those suspected of criminal responsibility for this crime face justice in fair trials...Intentionally targeting civilians in an armed conflict is a war crime and, as such, all states are permitted to exercise jurisdiction to investigate and prosecute. Al-Shabaab must immediately stop carrying out attacks on civilians, and the Somali authorities must ensure that victims’ families are offered justice, truth and reparation."

=== Nations ===
The government of Qatar condemned the attack, said that Qatar rejects the use of terrorism and expressed its condolences. Saudi Arabia's Ministry of Foreign Affairs strongly condemned the attack and sent its highest sympathy to the families of the victims, the Somali people, and the government. Oman expressed condemnation and affirmed its solidarity with Somalia Bahrain Foreign Affairs Ministry expressed "deep condolences and sympathy" to the people. Following the attack Jordan condemned the bombing; Turkey condemned the bombing as "heinous". Pakistan spokesperson Asim Iftikhar denounced the "cowardly" attack and showed solidarity with the people of Somalia The Indian Ministry of External Affairs strongly condemned the attacks, extended condolences to the families of the victims, and wished a "speedy recovery to those injured". It termed terrorism as "one of the gravest threats to international peace and security". The United Kingdom's foreign minister, James Cleverly, condemned the attack in the "strongest possible terms" and reiterated the government's support for the Somali government against terrorists. The United States condemned the "cowardly twin bombings in Mogadishu" and said: "As al-Shabaab loses on the battlefield, it continues to attack innocent Somali citizens."

=== Notable individuals ===
Pope Francis
(@Pontifex)
tweeted:

Let us pray for the victims of the terrorist attack in #Mogadishu, which killed more than a hundred people, including many children. May God convert the hearts of the violent!

30 October 2022

While speaking at the Angelus prayer, Pope Francis condemned the attack and mourned the "victims of the terrorist attack in Mogadishu, which killed more than 100 people, including many children."

== See also ==
- Mogadishu bombing (disambiguation)
