= 2022 Kismayo hotel attack =

Mass murder by al-Shabaab in Somalia

On 23 October 2022, al-Shabaab killed at least eight people in a bombing and shooting attack at a hotel in Kismayo, Somalia.

== Background ==
Somali Islamist group al-Shabaab began an insurgency in 2006, in an attempt to overthrow the Somali government and impose an extreme version of Sharia. Al-Shabaab often use bombs and guns to attack military and civilian targets, including many hotels. These include a suicide car bombing and mass shooting at the Asasey Hotel in Kismayo in 2019, in which they killed 26 people.

== Attack ==
At 12:45 pm on 23 October 2022, a suicide car bomber rammed the entrance gate of the Tawakal Hotel in Kismayo, a port city in Jubaland, in the far south of Somalia. Three al-Shabaab gunmen continued the attack inside the hotel for fifteen hours until they were shot dead by security forces. Later the same day, al-Shabaab claimed responsibility for the attack.A doctor at Kismayo Hospital said that eight people were killed, including four security personnel, and that 41 people were wounded. Government officials later reported that nine civilians had been killed and 47 had been wounded, while Al-Shabaab claimed that they had killed 27 and injured 53.
