= Hayat Hotel attack =

Terrorist attack in Somalia on 19–21 August 2022

Coordinates: 2.0310°N 45.3099°E

2022 Hayat Hotel terror attack
- Part of the Somali Civil War
- Date: 19–21 August 2022; 15:23 – after 30 hours (EAT +3)
- Target: Hotel Hayat
- Attack type: Car bombing, mass shooting, suicide bombing
- Weapons: Car bombs, guns
- Deaths: 22
- Injuries: 30
- Perpetrator: Al-Shabaab
- Motive: Act of terrorism

During the evening of 19 August 2022, al-Shabaab gunmen and militants attacked the Hayat Hotel in Mogadishu, Somalia. Initially, two car bombs exploded. Gunmen then stormed the hotel, shooting people and taking hostages. At least 22 people were killed, and 30 others were wounded. The number of gunmen involved in the attack was unknown.

== Reaction ==
- Somalia President Hassan Sheikh Mohamud held an extraordinary meeting with the National Security Committee and, during a televised address, declared "total war" against al-Shabaab.
- Pakistan The Ministry of Foreign Affairs condemned the attack.
- United States The United States Department of State released a statement condemning the attacks and praising Somalia's security forces.
- Turkey The Ministry of Foreign Affairs (Türkiye) Press Released Regarding the Terrorist Attacks in Somalia (Mogadishu).

== See also ==
- Mogadishu bombings
- Timeline of al-Shabaab-related events
