= Somali Civil War (2009–present) =

Ongoing conflict in the Horn of Africa

- Part of the Somali Civil War, conflicts in the Horn of Africa, the Ethiopian–Somali conflict, war against the Islamic State, Operation Enduring Freedom – Horn of Africa, and War on terror
- Approximate map of the current phase of the Somali Civil War (Updated March 2026) Somalia: Federal Government of Somalia, AUSSOM, the United States, and contested territory Somali Future Council: Government of Puntland Jubaland Dervish Force and the Raskamboni Movement Jihadist insurgent groups: Islamic Wilayat of Somalia (al-Shabaab) Islamic State-backed Somalia Wilayah Somaliland: Self-declared state of Somaliland For a more detailed map of the current military situation, see here.
Date	31 January 2009 – present (17 years, 9 months, 1 week and 4 days)
Location	Somalia, with spillovers in Kenya and Ethiopia
Status	Ongoing; Merger and split between/of Hizbul Islam and al-Shabaab forces; Kenyan military intervention in October 2011; Al-Shabaab becomes an official al-Qaeda ally in February 2012; Federal Government formed in August 2012; Formation of the Islamic State in Somalia in October 2015; Al-Shabaab invasion of Ethiopia in 2022; Somali government launches a major offensive in August 2022, and takes at least a third of al-Shabaab territory; Las Anod conflict between Somaliland and SSC-Khatumo begins in 2023; Ongoing constitutional crisis in Somalia since 2023, Puntland withdrew its recognition of the Federal Government and declared itself a de facto independent state; Jubaland crisis ongoing since 11 December 2024; South West State crisis since March 2026

Belligerents
Somalia; Somali Armed Forces; Regional forces: Galmudug; Galmudug Security Force; Ahlu Sunna Waljama'a (until 2018); (Somalia) Ma'awisley; Hirshabelle; North East State; Himan and Heeb (until 2015); (South West State of Somalia) South West State (until 2026, 2026–); United States: U.S. Army; U.S. Marine Corps; U.S. Air Force; U.S. Navy; CIA; AFRICOM; China: People's Armed Police; Turkey: Turkish Land Forces; AUSSOM (2025–): Burundi; Djibouti; Egypt; Ethiopia; Kenya; Uganda; ATMIS (2022–2024): Burundi; Djibouti; Ethiopia; Kenya; Uganda; AMISOM (2007–2022): Burundi; Djibouti; Ethiopia; Ghana; Kenya; Nigeria; Sierra Leone; Uganda; United Nations Missions: (United Nations) UNPOS (1995–2013); (United Nations) UNSOM (2013–2024): Brazil; Finland; Germany; Ghana; India; Indonesia; Nepal; Sierra Leone; Sweden; Thailand; Turkey; Uganda; United Kingdom; Zimbabwe; (United Nations) UNTMIS (2025–); (United Nations) UNSOA (2009–2016); (United Nations) UNSOS (2016–); Somali Future Council and allies; Puntland; Jubaland; Raskamboni Movement; (South West State of Somalia) Laftagareen militias	Al-Qaeda; Al‑Shabaab; Hizbul Islam (until 2010; 2012–2013); State allies: Afghanistan; Eritrea (alleged); Iran (alleged); Quds Force; North Korea (alleged); Qatar (alleged); Non-state allies: Houthis (alleged) (de facto control over most of Yemen's population) Somali pirates; Islamic State (since 2015); Somalia Wilayah; Allies; IS-YP; Somali pirates	Somaliland; Somaliland Armed Forces; SSB

Commanders and leaders
(Somalia) Hassan Sheikh; (Somalia) Hamza Abdi Barre; (Somalia) Hassan Mohomed Amardanbe; (Somalia) Odowaa Rageh; (Khatumo) Firdhiwe; (Galmudug) Ahmed Abdi Karie; (Hirshabelle) Ali Abdullahi Hussein; Diomede Ndegeya; Mohamed Ali Hassan; (United States) Barack Obama; (United States) Donald Trump; (United States) Joe Biden; (United States) Robert Gates; (United States) Leon Panetta; (United States) Chuck Hagel; (United States) Ash Carter #; (United States) Jim Mattis; (United States) Mark Esper; (United States) Lloyd Austin; (United States) Pete Hegseth; Casualties: (Somalia) Abdullahi Ali Ahmed Waafow †; (Somalia) Abdirahman Omar Osman †; (Somalia) Omar Hashi Aden †; (Somalia) Abbas Abdullahi Sheikh Siraji †; (Somalia) Ali Said †; (Somalia) Muhayadin Mohamed †; Juvenal Niyoyunguruza †; (Somalia) Amina Mohamed Abdi †; (Puntland) Said Deni; Ahmed Madobe; Abdiaziz Laftagareen	Ahmed Diriye; Mahad Karate; Fuad Qalaf; Ali Dheere; Ikrima; Jehad Mostafa; Hassan Afgooye; Abu Musa Mombasa; Casualties: Ahmed Godane †; Mukhtar Robow (surrendered); Mohamed Atom (surrendered) Hassan al-Turki #; Ibrahim al-Afghani †; Hassan Aweys (surrendered) Mohamed Mire †; Abu Mansoor †; Fadil Harun †; Saleh Ali Nabhan †; Abdulaziz bin Otash †; (Islamic State) Abdul Qadir Mumin Casualties: (Islamic State) Mahad Maalin †; (Islamic State) Abdihakim Mohamed Ibrahim †; (Islamic State) Bilal al-Sudani †	(Somaliland) Abdirahman Mohamed Abdullahi; (Somaliland) Nimcaan Yusuf Osman; (Somaliland) Nuh Ismail Tani; (Somaliland) Mohamed Hasan Abdullahi; (Somaliland) Muse Bihi Abdi; (Somaliland) Ahmed Mohamed Mohamoud #; (Somaliland) Ismail Mohamed Osman; (Somaliland) Faisal Bootaan (POW)

Units involved
Somali Armed Forces; Somali National Army; Danab Brigade; Galmudug forces; Hirshabelle forces; Ma'awisley; Somali Air Force; Somali Custodial Corps; Somali Police Force; NISA; UAE Armed Forces; UAEAF; US Armed Forces: US Army; US Marine Corps; US Air Force; US Navy; CIA; AFRICOM; China; PAP; AUSSOM; ENDF; (Ethiopia) Ethiopian Army; ETAF; KDF; Kenya Army; KAF; UPDF; Uganda Air Force; Djiboutian Army; Egyptian Army; Turkish Land Forces; Puntland forces; Security Force; Dervish Force; PMPF; Jubaland forces; Dervish Force; Raskamboni Movement	Al-Qaeda; Islamic Wilayah of Somalia; Al-Shabaab; Amniyat; Islamic State; Somalia Wilayah	Somaliland Armed Forces; Somaliland National Army; SSB; Somaliland Police Force; Somaliland Custodial Corps; Somaliland Fire Brigade

Strength
(Somalia) approx. 15,000 (2020; possibly over 30,000 as of 2022); 8,000–10,000 Ma'awisley (2023); ~11,900 personnel; 2,500; 1,410; 4,500; 1,520; 1,091; 2,000 (2013); 1,000 (2010) (United States) ~350 (2023) (Puntland) (Jubaland) ~15,800	7,000–12,000 (2022); 1,200 foreign mujahideen (2011); (Islamic State) 300–500 (mid-2024)	6,000–8,000 soldiers 1,000–2,000 officers 6,000 (2025)

Casualties and losses
(Somalia) 35,450+ killed (2009–2025) (Note: 1,745 killed (2023–2024), 2,987 killed (2024-2025)); 3,500 killed; (United States) 6 killed; (United States) 5 wounded; (China) 1 killed; (Puntland) (Jubaland) Unknown	40,568+ killed (2009–2025) (Note: 2,339 killed (2023–2024), 4,470 (2024-2025))	(Somaliland) 2,000 casualties (May 2023 estimate)
- 4,365 killed (in 2015) Jan 2009 – Oct 2012: 4,093–6,310 killed 10,938 wounded Total killed: 76,040+ (as of 6 September 2024, per ACLED)

The ongoing phase of the Somali Civil War began in 2009 and is concentrated in southern and central Somalia, primarily between the forces of the Federal Government of Somalia (FGS), assisted by African Union peacekeeping forces, and the Islamist militant group al-Shabaab, which pledged allegiance to al-Qaeda in 2012.

During the insurgency that followed the 2006 Ethiopian invasion of Somalia, al-Shabaab rose to prominence and made major territorial gains. Several weeks before the end of the military occupation, insurgents had seized most of the south and the Transitional Federal Government (TFG) was on the verge of collapse. In early 2009, Ethiopian troops withdrew from Somalia and former Islamic Courts Union leader Sharif Ahmed was elected president of the TFG, marking a new phase of the civil war. Al-Shabaab and allied Islamist groups continued fighting against the new TFG and the African Union mission (AMISOM) throughout 2009 and 2010, weakening the frail TFG further.

By 2010, al-Shabaab reached its peak operational capacity as it absorbed other factions and began embracing drastic changes in the types of attacks they utilized. That year the group merged with Hizbul Islam and also carried out the Kampala bombings in response to Ugandan support for AMISOM.

In August 2011, al-Shabaab withdrew from Mogadishu and lost the significant control it had established in the city since the insurgency began in 2007. While the group continues to carry out operations in the capital, the 2011 withdrawal marked the end of a strong insurgent presence. The Kenyan invasion of southern Somalia aimed at al-Shabaab, Operation Linda Nchi, began in October 2011. Coinciding with the operation, the Ethiopian military redeployed into Somalia in large numbers for the first time since 2009.

In 2012 the Federal Government of Somalia (FGS) was formed. By this time it was becoming increasingly clear that a purely military victory would not resolve the conflict, and during that same year al-Shabaab pledged allegiance to al-Qaeda. In 2014, ENDF troops in Somalia were formerly integrated into AMISOM.

Despite the growing challenges, al-Shabaab still controls large swathes of territory in southern Somalia. It remains influential in many rural areas, and it now prioritizes guerrilla and terror attacks over territorial acquisitions. The Islamic State in Somalia (ISS) and Hizbul Islam have also carried out attacks against both factions. In 2013 Hizbul Islam renounced violence against the government, but as of 2023, ISS remains active in northern Somalia. In 2023, the Las Anod conflict broke out in the northern part of Somalia between SSC-Khatumo and the Somaliland Army.

== Background ==
Established in 2004, the internationally recognized Transitional Federal Government's (TFG) in Somalia was waning until the United States-backed 2006 invasion by the Ethiopian National Defense Force (ENDF), which drove out the Islamic Courts Union (ICU) from power. Following this defeat, the ICU splintered into several different insurgent factions.

=== Emergence of the insurgency ===
In early 2007, many Somalis rallied behind an insurgency which aimed to expel the Ethiopian military occupation in Mogadishu. The Ethiopians were caught off guard by the scale and intensity of the emerging resistance, responding with bombardments of urban areas. Thousands of Ethiopian troops and Somalis had been killed during fierce fighting for Mogadishu. ENDF military losses had reached unsustainable levels by the end of 2007. In 2008 insurgent pressure intensified in the capital and across south-central Somalia, particularly in the Shabeelle, Jubba Valley, Bay, and Bakool regions. Skirmishes with ENDF/TFG forces soon morphed into a sustained insurgent offensive.

The TFG and its Ethiopian backers had low public support. The government lacked legitimacy, capacity, and credibility, and refused to broaden its political base throughout 2007. Opposition figures were purged from parliament, leaving a narrow coalition that failed to advance any political transition or create institutions. The TFG was widely seen as corrupt, fractured and abusive. Al-Shabaab, formerly a youth militia under the ICU's military wing, emerged as an independent faction in early 2007. It gained significant combat experience and began governing territory for the first time in 2008. The Ethiopian invasion transformed the group from a fringe entity to the predominant insurgent force in Somalia.

By 2008, most of the country had fallen under insurgent control, leaving the TFG on the brink of collapse. More than 80% of its police and army had deserted. The invasion failed to empower the TFG, which only controlled some parts of Mogadishu and its original 2006 capital of Baidoa by the end of 2008. The Ethiopian army withdrew with significant casualties and little to show for their efforts. The insurgency had achieved its primary goal of removing the Ethiopian military presence from most of Somalia by November 2008.

=== Ethiopian withdrawal and new TFG administration ===
The present iteration of the Somali National Army stems from the late 2008 peace agreement between the ascendant insurgent opposition of the Alliance for the Re-Liberation of Somalia (ARS) and the TFG.

As the Ethiopians withdrew from Somalia at the start of 2009 tensions between the differing insurgent factions escalated. By this time most elements of the pre-invasion Islamic Courts had merged into one of the two wings of the Alliance for the Re-liberation of Somalia (ARS) or had joined al-Shabaab, though some smaller factions continued operating independently under the ICU banner into 2009. A power-sharing deal was reached in Djibouti between the TFG and Sharif Sheikh Ahmed's ARS-D faction in late 2008. Al-Shabaab, which had broken away from the moderate Islamists, rejected the agreement and expanded its control, later joined by Hizbul Islam—a coalition of insurgent groups from the Ethiopian military occupation era, including the ARS-Asmara faction led by Hassan Dahir Aweys. Meanwhile, Ahlu Sunnah Waljama'ah, backed by Ethiopia and aligned with the TFG, fought and successfully repelled al-Shabaab advances in Galguduud.

Rather than eliminating jihadist activity in Somalia, the invasion significantly expanded it, with al-Shabaab's ranks growing from around 600 to several thousand fighters by the time of Ethiopia's 2009 withdrawal. Between 2004 and 2008, Ethiopia—then the TFG's main ally—trained thousands of Somali troops, but over 10,000 deserted or joined the insurgency. After Ethiopia's 2009 withdrawal, AMISOM assumed responsibility for rebuilding the army, which still lacked a functional chain of command.

After parliament took in 275 officials from the Alliance for the Re-liberation of Somalia, ARS leader Sheikh Ahmed was elected TFG President on 31 January 2009. Since then, the al-Shabaab radical Islamists have accused the new TFG President of accepting the secular transitional government and have continued the civil war since he arrived in Mogadishu at the presidential palace in early February 2009.

== Timeline ==
=== 2009–10: War begins ===
Al-Shabaab also vowed to fight the government. On 4 February 2009, four Islamist groups, including Hassan Dahir Aweys' Eritrean branch of the ARS merged and created the group Hisbi Islam, to oppose the new government of Sharif Sheikh Ahmed. The new TFG President Sheik Sharif Sheik Ahmed arrived in Mogadishu as president for the first time on 7 February 2009. The al-Shabaab and other radical Islamists began firing at the new TFG president hours later. They accused the new President of accepting the secular transitional government.

On 8 February, heavy fighting broke out in southern Mogadishu. al-Shabaab leader Sheikh Mukhtar Robow (Abu Mansur) met with Sharif Ahmed for peace talks during his visit to Mogadishu, while Omar Iman rejected the president. During these negotiations, Sharif Ahmed said that he would be prepared to enforce Sharia Law in Somalia, which was the radical groups' main demand. However, Sheikh Mukhtar Robow, a former al-Shabaab spokesman, denied having talked to Sharif Ahmed and vowed to continue fighting until his demands for Sharia Law were met. Sheikh Mukhtar Robow warned Nigeria against sending peace keepers to Somalia, as al-Shabaab viewed the AU peace keepers as occupying forces. An offensive was launched two days later by al-Shabaab to take the Bakool province. Government officials who had been ousted from Baidoa had been amassing troops in the city of Hudur (Xudur) and planning a major offensive to re-take Baidoa. Islamist forces attacked the province and reached the capital where they started a battle against government forces. In Galmudug, Clan militia took the town of Masagaway from al-Shabaab, while there was also fighting in Warsheekh.

The spokesman for al-Shabaab at the time, Sheikh Mukhtar Robow (Abu Mansur), rebuffed reports from several media outlets that a mutual agreement between him and newly elected president Sharif Ahmed was made. In his 12 February statement, he also added that he had no intention to contact the president on any matters, and that they would continue fighting against foreign troops and what he described as an "apostate" government. Al-Shabaab also vowed war against the new government. On 22 February, a double suicide bomb attack on an AU base in Mogadishu left 11 Burundian soldiers dead and another 15 wounded. Two days later, heavy fighting erupted in the city as TFG and AU forces attempted to retake the city from radical Islamist forces. The fighting lasted for two days and killed 87 people, including: 48 civilians, 15 insurgents and 6 TFG policemen. At the same time as the fighting raged in Mogadishu, al-Shabaab forces took the town of Hudor, to the northwest, in fighting that killed another 20 people: ten TFG soldiers, six insurgents and four civilians. On 28 February, it appeared that Hisbi Islam would sign a ceasefire with the Transitional Federal Government. However, by 1 March, it was clear that no ceasefire would be given, despite President Sharif Ahmed having agreed to proposals for a truce and having offered to accept the implementation of Sharia law but refused to move troops from civilian areas despite the Islamists doing so. al-Shabaab announced on 6 May that it would continue the war even if AMISOM withdrew. The Somali government, in turn, later announced an immediate blockade on airstrips and seaports under insurgent control to stop the flow of weapons reaching them.

==== Battle of Mogadishu and central Somalia ====
On 7 May, a fierce battle for control of Mogadishu started between al-Shabaab and Hizbul Islam against the TFG. Hundreds were killed and injured and tens of thousands were displaced. By 11 May, rebel forces gained the upper hand and made large gains taking over most of the capital. The rebels came close to overthrowing the government before fighting ended on 14 May, new rounds of fighting would last all through August. By 16 May, al-Shabaab captured the strategic town of Jowhar, which connects Mogadishu with central Somalia. One of the largest battles of the war took place about 3 weeks later on 5 June when Hizbul Islam captured Wabho leaving 50 combatants killed. On 19 June, the transitional parliament speaker Sheikh Adan Mohamed Nuur Madobe asked the international community to send foreign troops to Somalia within the following 24 hours. He stated that the government's power is on the verge of being defeated by Islamist forces in the Somali capital. The Somali cabinet declared a state of emergency, and asked for help from neighboring countries which included Kenya, Djibouti, Ethiopia and Yemen. Ethiopia refused saying intervention needs an international mandate. al-Shabaab responded by 21 June saying they would fight any foreign troops, and made threats against potential Kenyan intervention.

President Sheikh Sharif Ahmed declared a state of emergency by 22 June, as a new round of fighting in Mogadishu left 12 dead and 20 injured with hundreds more fleeing the city. The notion of Ethiopian troops intervening in the conflict caused defections by local government administration officials. Areas affected by this included Beledweyne, El-gal village, and Hiraan. The effects also caused many pro-government Islamic Courts Union officials to resign. In response, TFG forces led by general Muktar Hussein Afrah started military manoeuvers in the East side of Mogadishu. On 6 July, The Amir of al-Shabaab, Ahmed Godane gave government forces an ultimatum of five days to hand over their weapons which was rejected. At some point, foreign aid to the government was provided in the form of security advisors. On 17 July, two of these advisors (sent by France) were captured by insurgents. The Somali government gave permission for French commandos to launch operations inside Somalia to free the two French nationals that were held by al-Shabaab. France responded on 22 July by sending in warships and helicopters near the ports of Mogadishu and Marka declaring they would undertake military operations to free the two French military advisors who had been captured by insurgents. One of the hostages eventually was able to escape by August 2009, while the other was last seen in a video released in June 2010 asking for assistance.

The United States also took up targeting Al-Qaeda members. On 14 September several U.S. Navy helicopters launched a raid in Baraawe against Saleh Ali Saleh Nabhan, killing him as well as five other militants. Also in 2009, British Army soldiers from the Special Air Service and the Special Reconnaissance Regiment were deployed to Djibouti as part of Combined Joint Task Force – Horn of Africa to conduct operations against Islamist terrorists in Somalia. They carried out missions focusing on surveillance and targeting of terrorists, alongside their US counterparts. They have also been carrying out this role in Yemen.

==== Al-Shabaab-Hizbul Islam conflict ====
The armed conflict between Hizbul Islam and al-Shabaab began due to a dispute between the faction of the Ras Kamboni Brigades led by Sheikh Ahmed "Madoobe" and al-Shabaab, over a power sharing agreement in Kisimayo. Hizbul Islam and al-Shabaab had made a power sharing agreement for the city, where the power would rotate between the two factions, with each faction controlling the city for periods of six months. However, due to clan politics al-Shabaab refused to let the power rotation take place. This led to internal problems within Hizbul Islam as its ARS-A and JABISO factions, which were aligned with al-Shabaab in Hiran and Mogadishu, refused to support the Ras Kamboni Brigades, while Anole remained neutral. It also led to a split within the Ras Kamboni Brigades, with a faction led by Hizbul Islam's deputy chairman Sheikh Hassan "Turki" refusing to back Ahmad "Madoobe" and instead siding with al-Shabaab. It was reported on 1 October that heavy fighting in Kisimayo had broken out between the two factions, al-Shabaab controlled most of the city with dozens of casualties reported by the afternoon. At least 17 more people were killed in a series of battles overnight on 5 October. Hizbul Islam claimed that they had captured foreign fighters in the battle. The battle eventually ended with a decisive victory for al-Shabaab, which expelled Madbobe's Ras Kamboni Brigade forces from the city.

Throughout November 2009, fighting between the two factions continued as the battle lines moved into Southern Somalia, resulting in a decrease in insurgent attacks at Mogadishu targeting government forces (TFG) and their allies (AMISOM). Sheikh Ahmad Madobe's forces were ultimately overpowered by al-Shabaab and its local allies, and forced to withdraw from the Lower Juba region and most of Southern Somalia. The merger between al-Shabaab and Sheikh Hassan Turki's branch of the Ras Kamboni Brigades occurred early in 2010 (February) with a call for other groups in Hizbul Islam to do the same. Additional battles throughout 2010 were fought between Hizbul Islam and al-Shabaab in central Somalia as fighting moved from the Hiran region to the Bay region, to Lower Shabelle. Hizbul Islam eventually was forced to surrender the Luuq District in Gedo region to al-Shabaab, after which the group announced that it would merge with al-Shabaab. From mid-December al-Shabaab fighters started taking over Hizbul Islam positions. The merge was confirmed on 20 December, when Hizbul Islam Chairman Sheikh Hassan Dahir Aweys and Sheikh Mohammad Osman Arus, the organisation's official spokesman, surrendered to al-Shabaab and disbanded the organisation.

=== 2011–15: Government forces retake lost territory ===
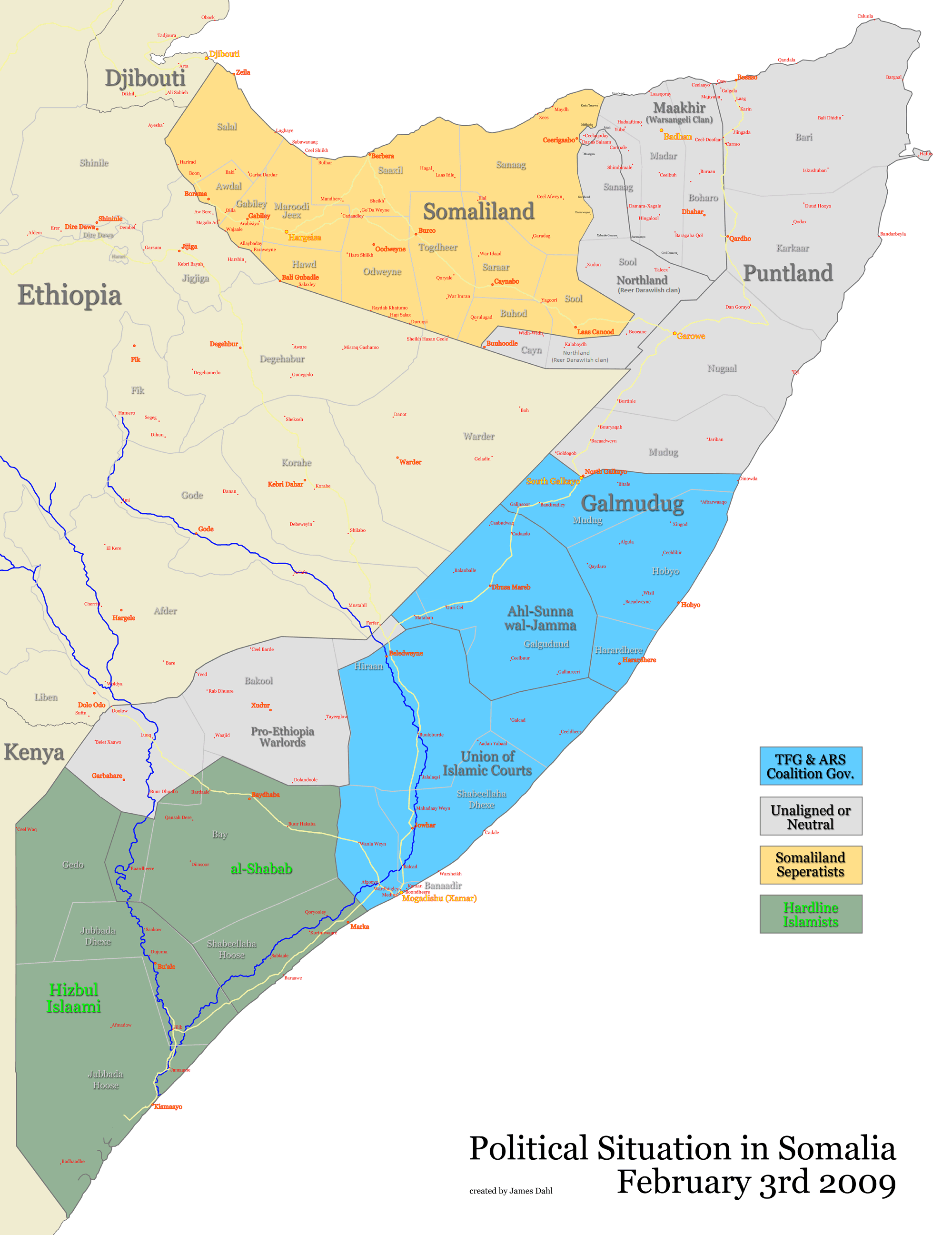
Situation of the war in Somalia in 2009

==== Battle of Gashandiga ====
Al-Shabaab controlled roughly half the lands claimed by the Somali government at their greatest extent in 2009 July. With the help of allies, government forces slowly started to make gains that would lead to a retake of lost territory through various military operations. An offensive on 20 February 2011 was dubbed by AU Representative Wafula Wamunyinyi as the "Battle of Gashandiga." This offensive involved AMISOM troops destroying a large complex of al-Shabaab trenches, killing six al-Shabaab commanders in Mogadishu. Towards the end of February, disturbances moved into Mogadishu again in the form of one suicide attack and heavy shelling as al-Shabaab fighters attempted to re-take lost territory. This push resulted in the deaths of at least 47 people, rebels displayed one wounded and five dead Burundian AMISOM soldiers. Another offensive was opened up between 26 February and 28 February by TFG troops with support of Ethiopian soldiers in Bula Hawo (southern Somalia), resulting in 33 deaths.

By 5 March, AMISOM and TFG forces claimed to control seven of the city's districts, while six were contested and three were controlled by anti-government forces. Al-Shabaab responded to the government offensive by putting up roadblocks to prevent the movement of goods from the seaport. This adversely affected both sides of the conflict, as the TFG controlled the port and its profits. At the same time though, places such as Bakaara Market were controlled by the insurgents where many of the goods were bound to be sold. It was also reported by this time that up to 53 AMISOM may have died in the clashes, which included 43 Burundian and 10 Ugandans. An additional 1,000 peacekeepers to assist in the TFG's renewed offensive against al-Shabaab were brought in, and by 16 March AMISOM had a force of nearly 9,000.

In early May 2011, al-Shabaab were pushed out of Garbahare by government forces commanded by Nur Matan Abdi. At least 26 al-Shabaab militants were killed, while just five government soldiers were wounded.

==== Defeat of al-Shabaab in Mogadishu ====
The 2010–11 battle of Mogadishu began when al-Shabaab militants launched an offensive to capture the city. The battle soon swung in favor of government forces, who were able to drive the militant group out by 11 October 2011. The complete capture of the city took place on 7 September 2012, when the Transitional Federal Government's troops and their AMISOM allies managed to secure the city. Around the same time witnesses reported al-Shabaab vehicles abandoning their bases in the capital for the south-central city of Baidoa. The group's spokesman Sheikh Ali Mohamud Rage described the exodus as a tactical retreat, and vowed to continue the insurgency against the national government. Observers have suggested that the pullout may have been caused in part by internal ideological rifts in the rebel organization. The city was by no means safe after al-Shabaab withdrew as the militant group continued hit and run tactics in the Northern part of the city. Suicide bombs continued to be an occurrence lasting into 2020 (see below).

==== Fighting in Puntland ====
On 2 to 3 September 2011, fighting was reported in Puntland that resulted in the deaths of up to 60 people, including eight Puntland soldiers and 40 al-Shabaab militants, with Insurgents being repelled. al-Shabaab claimed on 7 September that they have captured two Kenyan troops who were on a surveillance mission near the Kenyan-Somali Border. Puntland forces captured 18 members of al-Shabaab in counter-terrorism operations on 8 September.

==== Battle of Elwaq & Kismayo offensive ====
Map of coalition advances from 2011 to February 2013

al-Shabaab attacked the southern town of Elwaq on 10 September 2011, resulting in the deaths of 12 insurgents and soldiers. The next day, Somali troops fought back, retaking the town after militants fled on captured technicals. The bodies of 30 militants were later found, some of them children. Conversely, al-Shabaab claimed they killed around 70 government aligned troops and captured 10 technicals.

The Burundian military lost 51 soldiers in October, causing anger among Burundians, who believed their country was sacrificing too much. Many Burundians urged other AU members to contribute troops to the Somalia mission. Nigeria, Djibouti, and Guinea considered sending troops, but none contributed.

On 4 September 2012, the Kenyan Navy shelled Kismayo as part of an AU offensive to capture the city from al-Shabaab fighters. The harbour was shelled two times and the airport three times. According to a UN report, the export of charcoal through Kismayo was a major source of income for al-Shabaab.

On 28 September 2012, the Somali National Army assisted by AMISOM troops and Ras Kamboni militia launched an assault on Kismayo, al-Shabaab's last major stronghold. The allied forces reportedly managed to re-capture much of the city from the insurgents.

==== Operation Indian Ocean & Jubba Corridor ====
In August 2014, AMISOM, supported by Somali forces, began Operation Indian Ocean. On 1 September 2014, a US drone strike carried out as part of the broader mission killed al-Shabaab leader Mukhtar Abu Zubeyr, also known as Ahmed Godane. US authorities hailed the raid as a major symbolic and operational loss for al-Shabaab, and the Somali government offered a 45-day amnesty to all moderate members of the militant group. Political analysts also suggested that the insurgent commander's death will likely lead to al-Shabaab's fragmentation and eventual dissolution.

From 19 July 2015, AMISOM and the Somali National Army regained many villages and the major towns of Bardhere and Dinsoor. Operation Piga Jangili, seizing Bardhere, involved fighting for six hours against an estimated 175 to 200 insurgent opponents. "Upon entering the kill zone, several Improvised Explosive Device initiated ambushes [delayed] convoy movement and killed and wounded multiple KDF soldiers." Then-Captain William Doyle of 10th Special Forces Group, US Army, won the Silver Star for "exposing himself to effective fire so he could ... keep the KDF convoy moving through the valley." The medal citation credits his actions with contributing to 173 enemy killed and 60 more wounded, while saving "countless" partner forces.

=== 2016: Battle of El Adde and resurgence of al-Shabaab ===
On 15 January 2016, al-Shabaab attacked a Kenyan-run AMISOM base in El Adde Somalia, overrunning the compound and killing approximately 185 soldiers. Al-Shabaab then regained the important town of Marka, 45 km from the capital, and the port of Gard in Puntland region (March 2016). Al-Shabaab's activities create constant dilemmas for international humanitarian aid organisations.

On 5 March 2016, US aircraft and unmanned drones killed more than 150 al-Shabaab insurgents at a training camp called "Camp Raso", located about 120 miles north of Mogadishu as they were "training for a large-scale attack," according to a spokesman for the United States Department of Defense. The camp had been under surveillance for some time before the strike. In the early hours of 9 March 2016, US Somali special forces killed between 1 and 15 al-Shabaab fighters in a heliborne-attack on the al-Shabaab-controlled town of Awdhegele, as well as capturing an undisclosed number of high-value al-Shabaab figures.

On 11/12 April 2016, two US airstrikes on al-Shabaab targets in the town of Kismayo killed about a dozen suspected militants who posed an "imminent threat" to American troops in the country. As of May 2016, roughly 50 US special operations troops operate at undisclosed locations across southern Somalia, with their headquarters at the airport in Mogadishu; advising and assisting, Kenyan, Somali and Ugandan forces in their fight against al-Shabaab. Also in that month, US personnel helped those forces plan an operation against illegal checkpoints.

On 12 May 2016, a small group of US military advisers accompanied some Ugandan soldiers during a raid on an illegal taxation checkpoint just west of Mogadishu, when the Ugandans came under fire from 15 to 20 al-Shabaab militants, the US commander on the ground called in a "defensive" airstrike, killing five militants and wounding two more. Two days prior, the US provided helicopters and advise and assist in support of a Somali military mission against a group of al-Shabaab militants, which one defense official said was also defensive because they had intelligence that the al-Shabaab fighters were planning an attack on the AMISOM installation nearby. No word on how many al-Shabaab were killed or wounded in that operation. On 13 May, a US strike targeted nine al-Shabaab militants, three of them were allegedly killed.

On the night of 31 May 2016, two senior al-Shabaab operatives; Mohamud Dulyadeyn, the plotter behind the Garissa University attack in April 2015 and Maalim Daud, head of al-Shabaab's intelligence hit squads and another 16 members from al-Shabaab were killed by the Somali National Army and anti-terror partners. Defense Department spokeswoman Lt. Col. Michelle L. Baldanza told CNN "US forces supported this Somali-led operation in an advise-and-assist role,".

On 1 June 2016, al-Shabaab militants attacked with a car bomb on the gate of Ambassador Hotel in Mogadishu, Somalia. At least 15 people have been killed in the attack, among 10 civilian pedestrians and two members of parliament near the gate. Also that day, the Pentagon announced that it had conducted an airstrike that killed a senior al-Shabaab leader in Somalia on 27 May. On 3 August 2016, a contingent of elite American troops acting as military advisers assisted Somali commandos in an assault on an al-Shabaab checkpoint in Saakow, as the Somali-led force approached the checkpoint the militants opened fire, a gun battle ensued that resulted in 3 militants killed.

On 29 September 2016, a Somali regional government demanded an explanation from the United States after an airstrike killed 22 civilians and other soldiers instead of the targeted al-Shabaab militants in Galmudug. The Military Times also reported that on 26 September a bomb-manufacturing network linked al-Shabaab attacked a small team of US and Somali troops, who were conducting an operation near Kismayo, with small-arms fire. A Pentagon spokesman said the US military "conducted a self-defense strike to neutralize the threat and in doing so killed nine enemy fighters." Also on 28 September, near the town of Galkayo, a Somali army unit conducting counterterrorism operations nearby, when the Somali soldiers came under fire from al-Shabaab militants. The Somali soldiers engaged them, then broke contact and rejoined with their nearby American advisers and soon afterwards the militants "began to maneuver in an offensive manner" so the US conducted a self-defense airstrike, killing 4 militants.

=== 2017: American involvement expanded ===
In late March 2017, President Donald Trump gave US Africa Command more freedom to conduct airstrikes and other military operations.

In addition to stepping up airstrikes, US special forces fighting with Somali forces have also been increased, conventional US troops give lessons in building defense institutions, with added support from other nations.

CNN reported that General Thomas Waldhauser, commander of AFRICOM, told reporters in April that the US seeks to help Somali security forces gain the ability to provide for their own security by 2021.

The New York Times reported that on 4 May 2017, a US Navy SEAL team partnered with Somali National Army forces, carried out a mission on an al-Shabaab-occupied complex around 60 kilometres (40 mi) west of Mogadishu. Fox News reported that they targeting what Pentagon spokesperson Captain Jeff Davis said was a "group of people" associated with attacks on Mogadishu. The New York Times reported that Defence Department officials said that Somali forces were to have led the operation, with the SEALs hanging back in an advise, assist and accompany role, however Brig. Gen. David J. Furness, the commander of the military's task force for the Horn of Africa, said that American and Somali forces were traveling together in a single group. Whilst approaching the complex, the militants opened fire, and the mission was aborted; Senior chief petty officer Kyle Milliken was killed, 2 other SEALs and an interpreter were wounded. Captain Jeff Davis said that the mission "resulted in the death of three Shabaab operatives, including Moalin Osman Abdi Badil," and the group quickly returned to the aircraft that had taken it to the area and was exfiltrated. Davis described Badil as an al-Shabaab leader responsible for gathering information on troop movements in order to support attacks on Somali and African Union forces and said he had been linked to the death of several soldiers and at least one civilian.

CNN reported that on 11 June 2017, a US airstrike killed 8 al-Shabaab militants in Sakow; the president of Somalia said that "This was a successful strike which destroyed a key al-Shabaab command and supply hub," and that "This will ultimately disrupt the enemy's ability to conduct new attacks within Somalia." CNN reported that on 23 July 2017, The US carried out a targeted airstrike an al-Shabaab regional commander in Banadir. Fox News reported that on 30 July 2017, a US strike near Tortoroow in southern Somalia which was coordinated with regional partners as a direct response to al-Shabaab's actions which included attacks on Somali forces, killed Ali Jabal, who was considered a senior al-Shabaab terrorist and was responsible for leading forces operating in the Mogadishu and Banadiir area, including planning and carrying out attacks in Mogadishu.

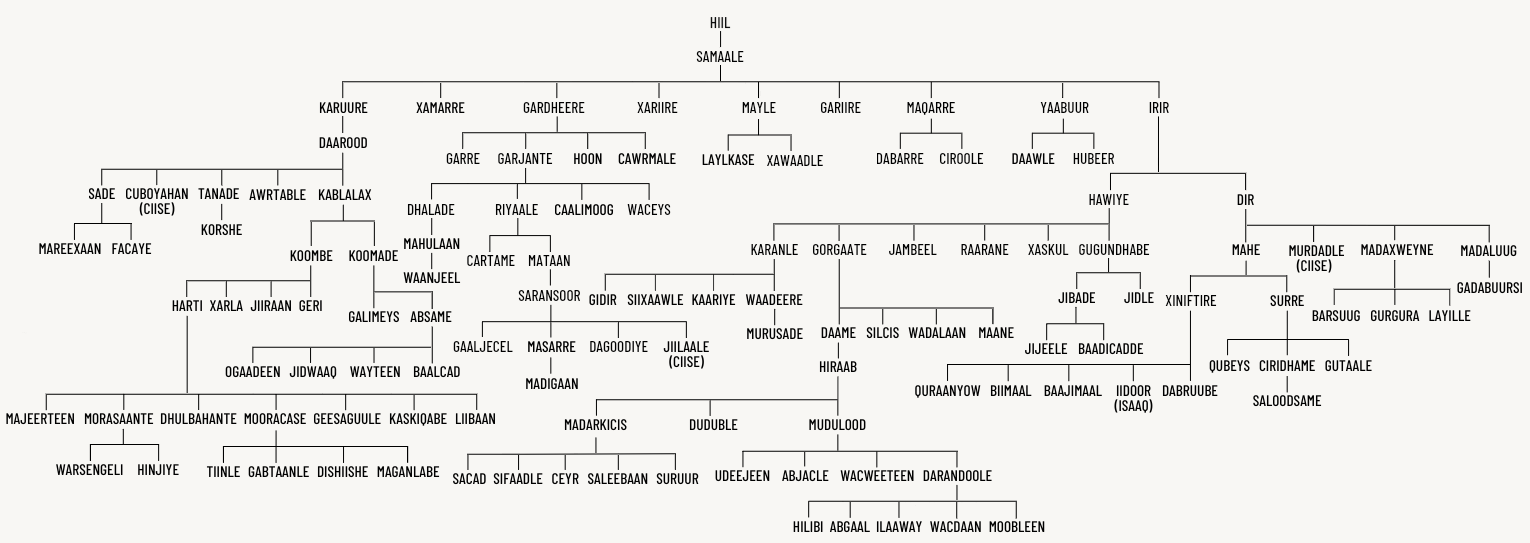
Genealogical tree of Somali clans

ABC reported that on 10 August 2017, airstrikes conducted by drones in Banaadir in a joint operation against al-Shabaab fighters killing a high-level al-Shabaab leader. The airstrikes marked the fourth offensive airstrike against al-Shabaab since the new authorisation in March. CNN reported that on 17 August 2017, the US conducted a "self defense" drone strike in Jilib after a joint US-Somali force, consisting of Somali troops and US advisors, came under direct attack by al-Shabaab militants and a firefight ensued, 7 militants were killed.

Military.com reported that on 3 November 2017, a US drone conducted two airstrikes against Islamic State in Somalia; at least six missiles were used, striking in Buqa, 37 miles north of Qandala, AFRICOM said in a statement that "several terrorists" were killed and that the strikes were carried out in coordination with Somalia's government, marking the first time the US has conducted airstrikes against ISS terrorists in Somalia. CNN reported that US drone aircraft conducted five strikes between 9 and 12 November against al-Shabaab and ISS-linked militants, killing 36 al-Shabaab and four ISS fighters. One of the strikes killed an al-Shabaab member who had attacked a joint US-Somali military convoy in Gaduud. CNN reported that a US airstrike on a camp 125 miles northwest of Mogadishu killed more than 100 al-Shabaab militants; the US now estimates there are between 3,000 and 6,000 al-Shabaab fighters and fewer than 250 ISIS operatives in Somalia. Military Times reported that on 14 November, a US drone strike roughly 60 miles northwest of Mogadishu killed several al-Shabaab militants. CNN reported that on 24 December, a US airstrike in southern Somalia killed 13 al-Shabaab terrorists.

=== 2018–present: Ongoing guerrilla warfare ===
Ongoing armed conflicts in 2019 around the world Wars, 1,000–9,999 deaths in current or past calendar year

On 15 December 2018, there were demonstrations in Baidoa by supporters of Mukhtar Robow, a presidential candidate, who was arrested two days earlier by government forces and transferred to Mogadishu. Robow is a former member of al-Shabaab. Robbow was seized by the Ethiopian National Defence Force. African Union Mission in Somalia (AMISOM) announced in a statement that its forces did not assist in Rowbow's arrest and his transfer to Mogadishu.

==== 2019 ====
By 2019, the United States was heavily involved in the war, using airstrikes. On 14 April, AFRICOM killed Abdulhakim Dhuqub, a high-ranking ISIS-Somalia official, near Xiriiro, Bari Region. On 25 October, a US airstrike targeted Islamic militants near Ameyra, south of Bosaso, which killed three of their leaders.

On 12 July, A car bombing and gun attack killed at least 26 people, including two prominent journalists and nine foreigners, in Kismayo, Lower Juba. On 22 July, a bombing killed 17 people and injured 28 others in Mogadishu. On 24 July, a suicide bomber detonatedd inside the office of the Mayor of Mogadishu, killing six government officials; mayor Abdirahman Abdi Osman was hospitalised in Doha, Qatar before succumbing to his injuries on 1 August.

On 26 August, the Somali Army captured Burweryn from al-Shabaab.

On 28 December, an al-Shabaab suicide truck bomber killed at least 85 people at a police checkpoint in Mogadishu.

==== 2020 ====
On 5 January, al-Shabaab militants attacked the airstrip of the military base Camp Simba, which is used by US and Kenyan forces. One US serviceman and two contractors were killed; two US servicemen were wounded and four militants were also killed in the gunfight. On 19 March, the Somali Army captured Janale town from al-Shabaab, with support from the US military.

On 31 May, the Somali military shot dead approximately 18 al-Shabaab militants and injured several others in an operation conducted in the southern Lower Shabelle region.

==== 2021 ====
On 7 February, a roadside bomb exploded in Dusmareb, Galguduud, killing 12 agents working for the National Intelligence and Security Agency. The local head of the intelligence agency, Abdirashid Abdunur, was among those killed.

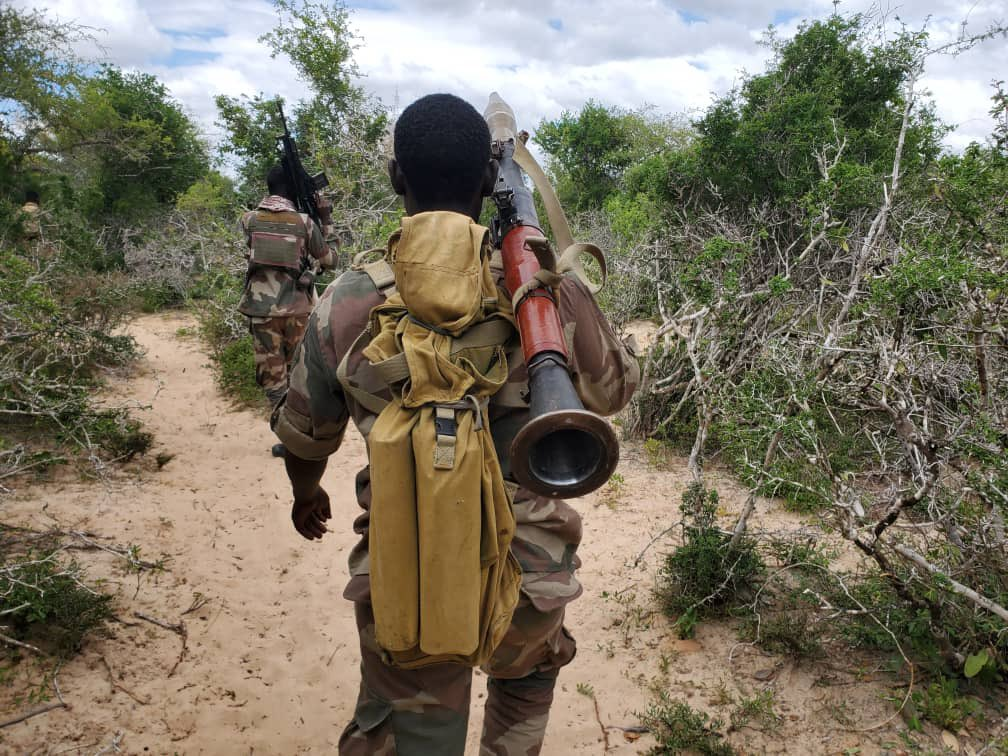
Somali National Army soldier with an RPG-7, 2021

On 14 February, al-Shabaab killed two SNA soldiers in Awdheegle district in Lower Shabelle.

On 2 March, al-Shabaab publicly killed five people by firing squad for allegedly spying for the United States and Somali intelligence agencies in Jilib, Middle Juba. Hundreds of people reportedly gathered to watch the killings.

On 5 March, a suicide car bomber killed at least 20 people outside a restaurant in Mogadishu.

On 3 April, al-Shabaab militants attacked two SNA bases near Mogadishu, resulting in several hours of fighting. The SNA said they killed 77 al-Shabaab militants. al-Shabaab said they killed 47 SNA troops in the attack. On the same day, a suicide bomber detonated their suicide vest targeting civilians outside a teashop in Mogadishu. The attack left 6 people dead, including the perpetrator.

On 10 April, a suicide bomber tried to kill a regional governor in Baidoa. The governor escaped, but 3 others were killed in the attack, including two of his bodyguards.

On 14 April, 17 civilians were killed when an IED exploded as a minibus drove over it whilst travelling on the Mogadishu-Jowhar road.

From 25 April – 6 May, hundreds of Somali soldiers mutinied.

On 12 June, a Somali policeman was killed and two others were wounded when ISIS operatives detonated an IED at a police checkpoint in the City of Afgooye, 20 km northwest of Mogadishu.

On 15 June, at least 15 Somali Army recruits were killed when an al-Shabaab suicide bomber blew himself up at a Somali Army training camp in Mogadishu.

On 27 June, Puntland executed 21 al-Shabaab prisoners in the largest single execution of al-Shabaab fighters in Somalia.

On 10 July, nine people were killed after a car bomb exploded in Mogadishu. Al-Shabaab later claimed responsibility.

On 24 September, two Somali policemen were shot dead by ISS operatives in Mogadishu.

On 25 September, at least eight people were killed and six others were wounded in a suicide bombing in Mogadishu.

On 25 November, an al-Shabaab suicide bomber in a sport utility vehicle killed eight people in Mogadishu.

On 5 December, al-Shabaab claimed responsibility for a bomb blast at a restaurant in Awdhegle in southern Somalia. At least five people, including civilians, were killed and more than six others wounded in the attack.

==== 2022 ====
On 12 January, al-Shabaab claimed responsibility for a car bomb that killed eight people and wounded another nine outside the Mogadishu International Airport, a facility that hosts the United States Embassy and other diplomatic offices. The group said via a radio address that a convoy of "white officials" had been the target of the bombing.

On 19 February, a suicide bombing in a restaurant in the city of Beledweyne killed 14 people. Al-Shabaab later claimed responsibility.

On 23 March, al-Shabaab carried out attacks in Mogadishu and Beledweyne. Politicians Amina Mohamed Abdi and Hassan Dhuhul were among killed.

On 3 May, at least 30 soldiers of the African Union, including 10 Burundian soldiers, were killed after al-Shabaab militants attacked an African Union military base near the village of Ceel Baraf, about 100 miles north of Mogadishu. At least 20 al-Shabaab fighters were reportedly killed.

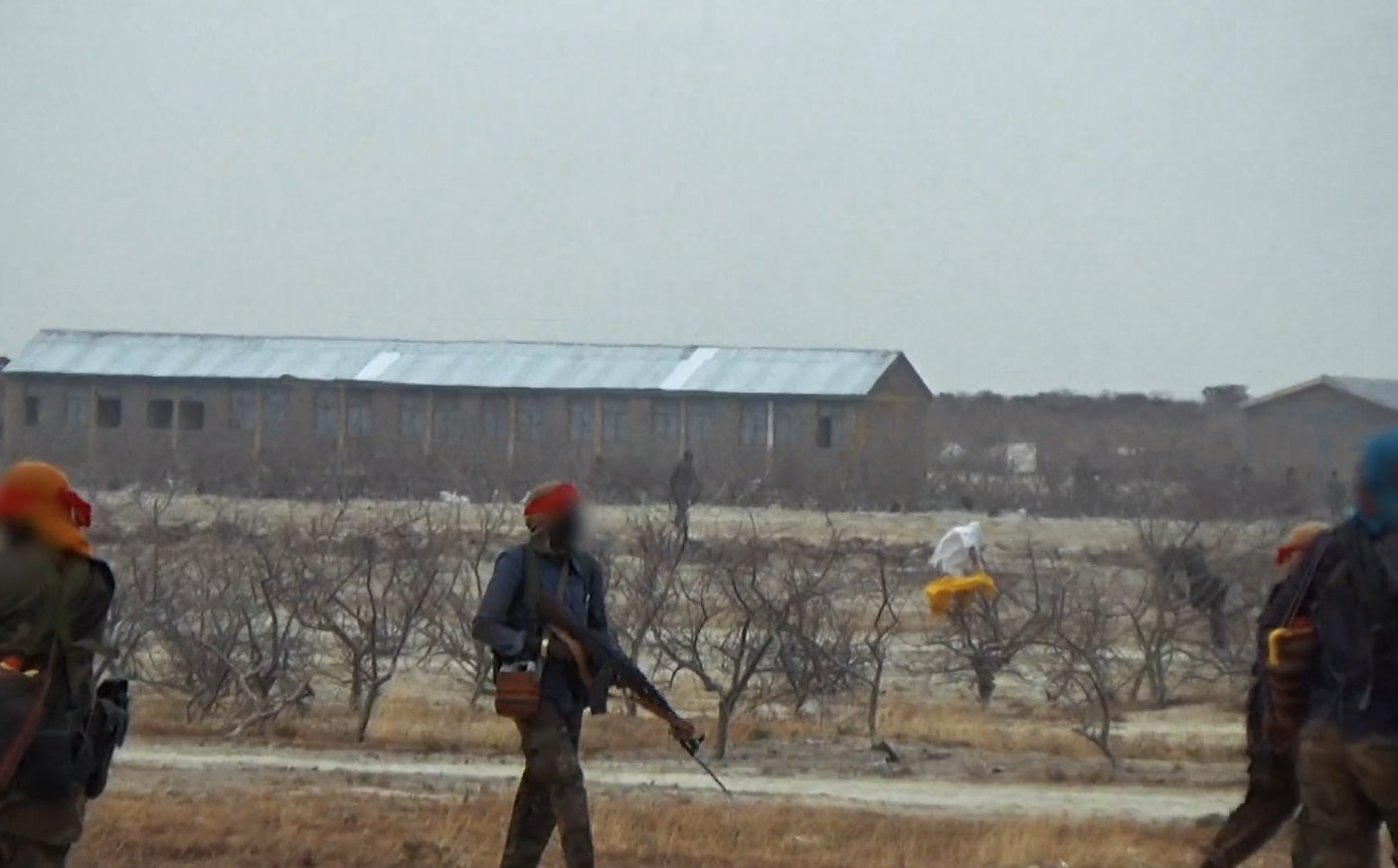
Al-Shabaab fighters in Ethiopia, July 2022

In late July, al-Shabaab launched an invasion of Ethiopia with at least 1,500 militants. The insurgents captured a town, advanced up to 150 kilometres (93 mi), and inflicted heavy losses on the Ethiopians before being driven back by security forces.

On 19 August, al-Shabaab militants attacked a hotel in Mogadishu, killing at least 21 people and wounding over 100. In response to the terror attack, President Hassan Sheikh Mohamud declared "total war" against al-Shabaab. Cooperating with United States forces (who contributed airstrikes against al-Shabaab, one of which killed 27 al-Shabaab militants with no civilian casualties reported), an offensive operation began to weaken al-Shabaab's forces in the Hiran region. The offensive operations had been described as the "largest combined Somali and ATMIS offensive operation in five years."

It was reported that at least 43,000 Somalis died as a result of drought in 2022.

==== 2023 ====
The Somali army had been expanding anti-al-Shabaab efforts from beyond Hirshabelle state, and they were now beginning to strike at al-Shabaab bases in Galmudug state. The army cooperated with local Gedir clan militias and drone strikes from the United States in Mudug, seizing the towns of Harardhere and Galcad in January as a result. Al-Shabaab was reported to begin increasing its use of IEDs when fighting, while also targeting civilians for attacks. The group was also reported to be targeting drug dealers and robbers in Mogadishu, in an apparent drive to gain support for the group in the city.

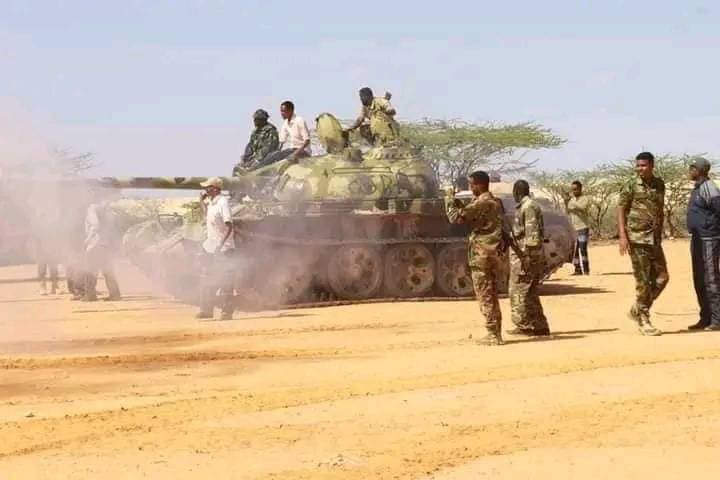
SSC Khaatumo T-55 tank facing off with Somaliland troops during Las Anod war, 2023

Fighting broke out between the Khatumo State and Somaliland, leading to the 2023 Las Anod conflict where Khatumo Forces captured nearly all military bases and towns in the Sool region, but fighting is still ongoing.

In March it was reported that al-Shabaab has lost one third of its territory in Somalia, since the government launched its major military offensive in August 2022.

On 26 March, the president of Somalia declared the start of the second phase of the offensive operations.

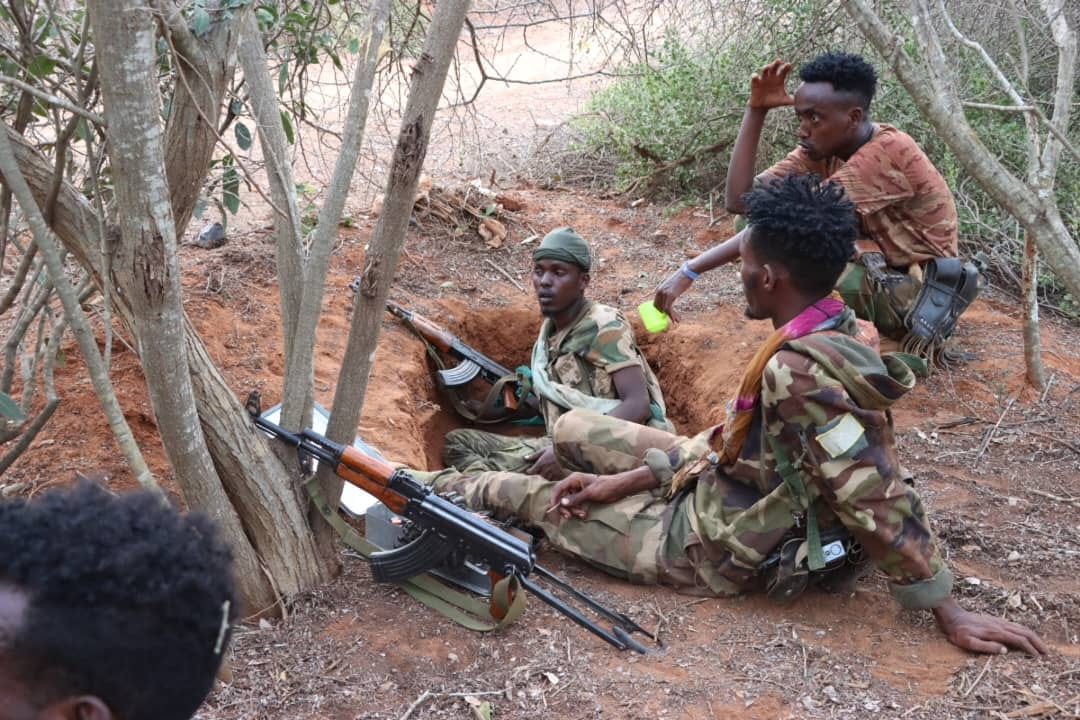
Somali National Army captures forest positions from Al-Shabaab, 2023

On 26 May, al-Shabaab launched a deadly attack on the Buulo Mareer military base using vehicle-borne improvised explosive devices and suicide bombers. Ugandan troops discovered the bodies of 54 Ugandan soldiers who were killed in the attack. The discovery took place as the Uganda People's Defense Force (UPDF) regained control of the forward operating base in Buulo Mareer, about 120 kilometers southwest of Mogadishu, State House Uganda said via Twitter Saturday.

Armed clashes was reported in the town of Masagaway after an al-Shabaab attack on a military base there on 30 May. The government claimed to have ambushed the al-Shabaab contingent and inflicted casualties upon them after they withdrew from their attack on the base.

The African Union has been giving up bases to the Somali Armed Forces since June, the African Union (AU) is winding down its peacekeeping mission in the country and AU soldiers will finally depart at the end of 2024, leading to concern of what will happen next.

A decisive turning point in the war came during the Battle of Osweyne in late August 2023, where the SNA suffered a severe defeat and retreated from hard fought regions.

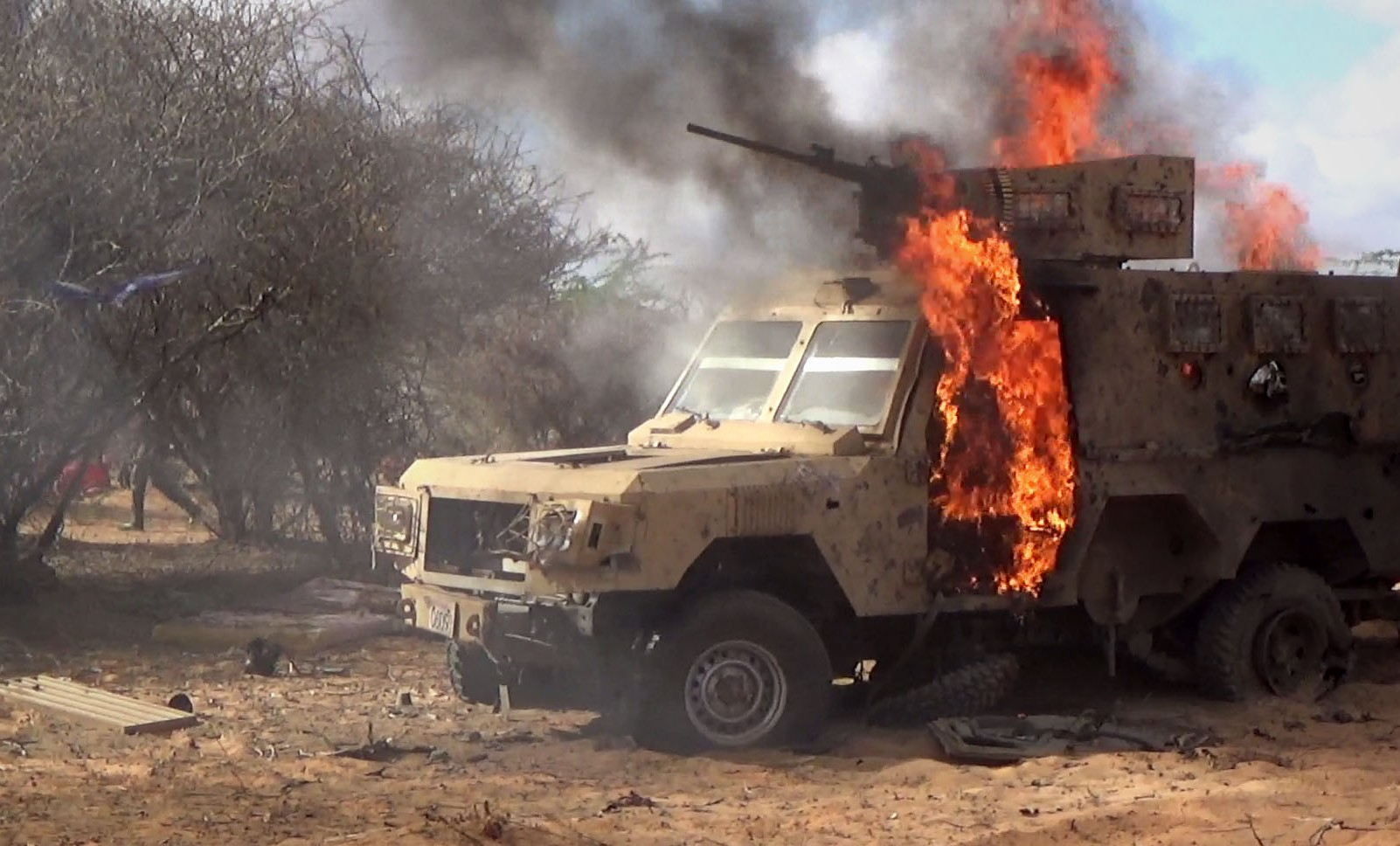
Somali National Army APC destroyed during the Battle of Osweyne, August 2023

On 17 September it was reported that 20-plus Ethiopian National Defense Force (ENDF) fighters were killed/captured by al-Shabaab fighters in Rabdhure, Bakool .

On 29 September a suicide bomber exploded a bomb in a tea shop in Mogadishu.

On 26 November, the United Nations announced that they are lifting the arms embargo on Somalia next month.

==== 2024 ====
On 10 January, al-Shabaab militants attacked a UN helicopter and forced it to make an emergency landing. They then burned the helicopter and seized most of the crew of nine people. One person was killed, and two others were unaccounted for after the incident.

On 6 February, four bombings inside Bakaara Market in the Somali capital killed at least ten people and injured about fifteen others. On 11 February, al-Shabaab attacked the General Gordon Military Base in the Somali capital Mogadishu, resulting in deaths of four Emirati troops and one Bahraini military officer.

In the last quarter of 2023, the Somali National Army captured new localities in south Mudug, but by the end of February 2024, they had been given back up for al-Shabaab to reoccupy. In north Galmudug, the SNA secured the villages to support the Ma'awisley clan militia present. But when Ma'awisley withdrew following a land dispute between their leadership and Somali president Hassan Sheikh, the SNA was too weak to remain on its own and was forced to withdraw as well. In other localities, however, the reasons for losses were different, as SNA troops were in sufficient numbers to hold the town. Discipline was lacking; many soldiers lost their nerve and broke ranks during a battle with insurgents.

On 14 March, militants attacked and sieged the SYL Hotel in Mogadishu.

On 13 July, at least eight people were killed, and twenty-one others were injured in a shootout between security forces and inmates in a Mogadishu prison during an escape attempt. The prisoners who attempted to escape were members of al-Shabaab. On 14 July, 10 people were injured in a cafe due to a car bombing done by al-Shabaab.

On 2 August, 37 people were killed by an al-Shabaab suicide bomber at Lido Beach.

On 18 October, seven were killed in another café bombing in Mogadishu.

Throughout late October, Somalia's spy agency killed 40 al-Shabaab militants and injured many others.

==== 2025 ====
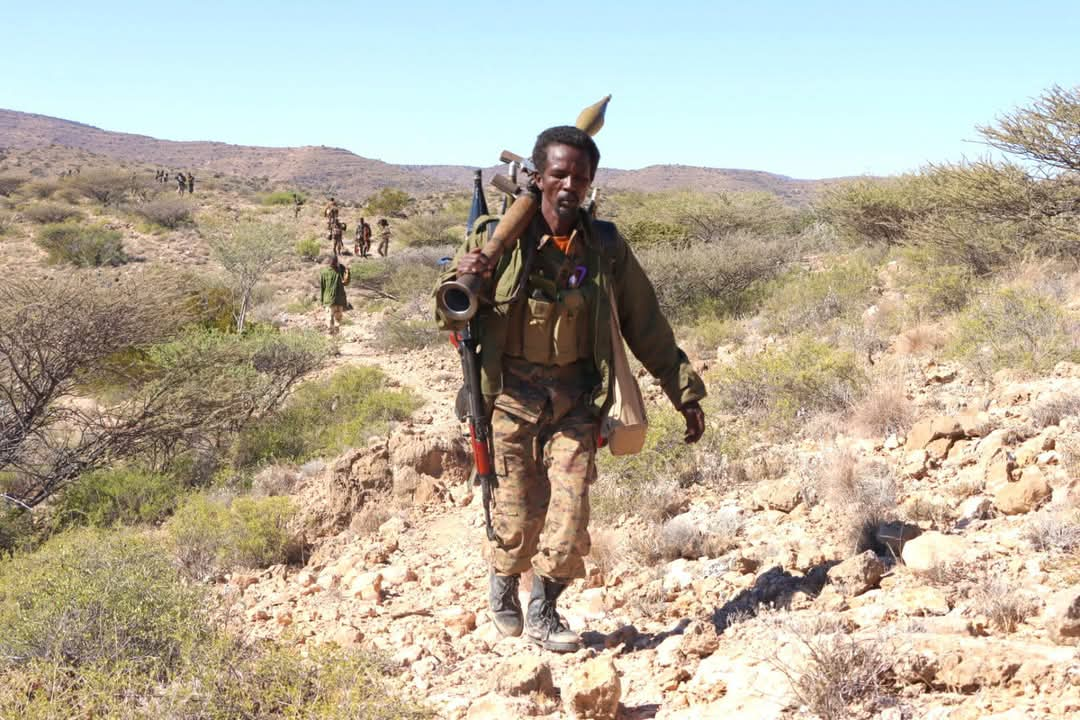
Puntland Security Force troops in the Cal Miskaad Mountains during fighting against Daesh, February 2026

On 8 January 2025, the Puntland armed forces greatly increased their fight against Islamic State militants in the Al Miskat mountain range, located in the Bari region. These forces said they are working to block all escape routes and are closing in on areas where the militants are hiding. Puntland's Counter-Terrorism Operation said their troops are surrounding the Al Miskat mountains and moving into the suspected hideouts. Security operations are also happening in nearby areas like Hamure. The security force is also talking to local people and asking them not to collaborate with the militants. They warned residents to stay away from the group before it was too late.

On 9 January 2025, Puntland forces carried out drone strikes on Islamic State targets in the Cal Miskaad mountains near Balidhidhin District of Bari. The counterterrorism forces claimed that they killed several militants.

On 20 February 2025, al-Shabaab launched attacks on several villages and military bases in the Middle Shabelle and Hiran region, causing the deaths of 130 al-Shabaab militants and dozens of Somali soldiers.

On 4 March 2025, the U.S. Embassy in Mogadishu has warned of imminent attack threats from al-Shabaab in Mogadishu including at Aden Adde International Airport. Embassy personnel movements are suspended. The embassy also warned that militant groups continue to plan kidnappings, bombings, and other attacks across the country. Turkish Airlines and Qatar Airways halted all flights to Mogadishu following security warnings from the U.S. Embassy about potential terrorist attacks targeting Mogadishu Airport.

On 18 March 2025, Hassan Sheikh Mohamud, president of Somalia, was targeted by al-Shabaab in a roadside bombing assassination attempt using improvised explosive devices near Villa Somalia while his entourage headed to Aden Adde International Airport in Mogadishu. Hassan survived the attack.

On 16 April 2025, al-Shabaab captured the town of Adan Yabaal from government forces. The town has strategic military significance and serves as a critical logistical hub connecting Hirshabelle state to the neighboring central state of Galmudug.

An American airstrike carried out on September 12, 2025, in Badhan, in the region of Sanaag in Puntland, which targeted a traditional leader accused of being a member of Al-Shabaab, was executed in coordination with the Somali federal government.

==== 2026 ====
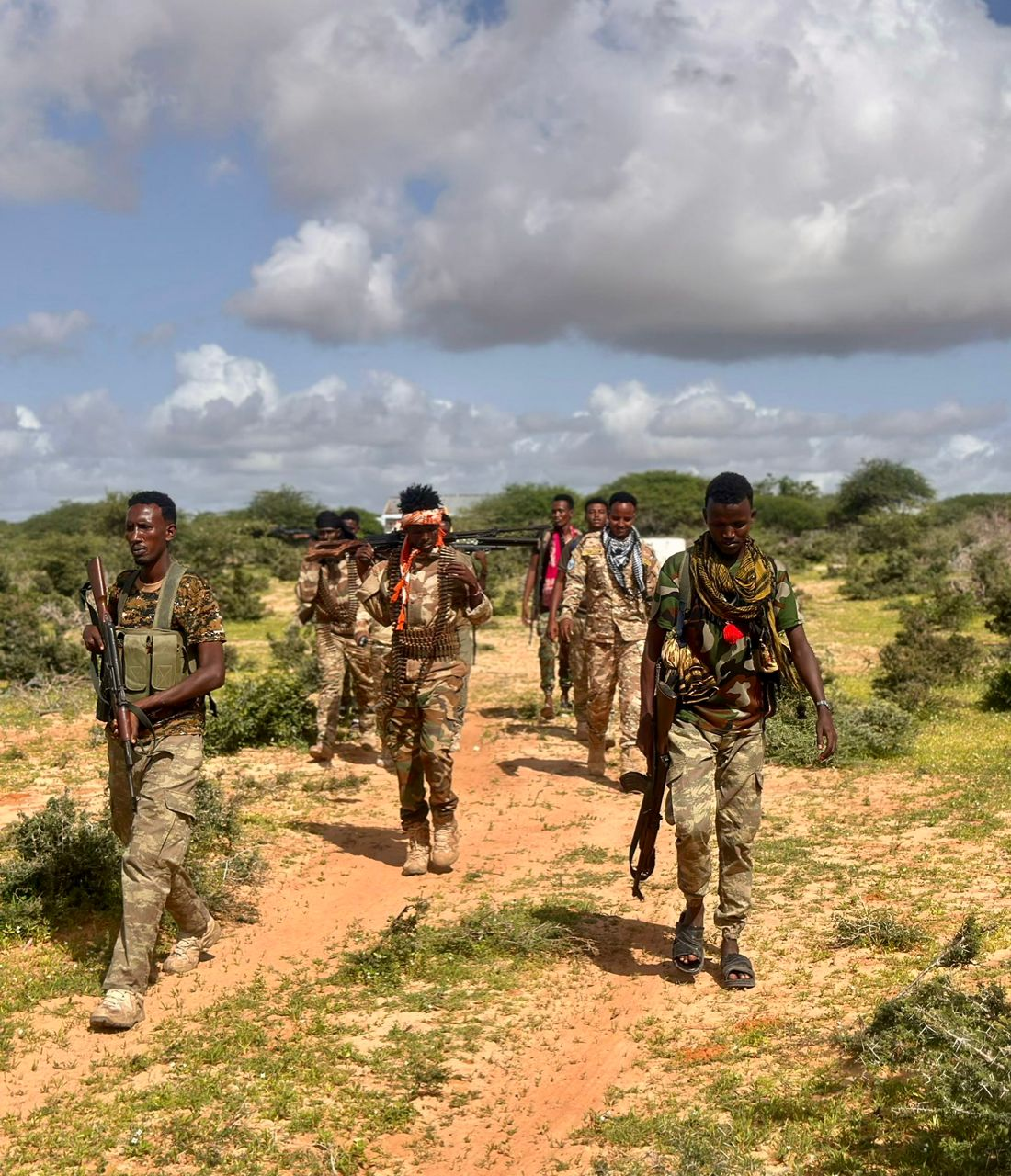
SNA Gorgor patrol in Middle Shabelle, May 2026

In the early months of 2026, the US and allies continued airstrikes targeting militia forces, like al-Shabaab, near Mogadishu, while the African Union Support and Stabilization Mission in Somalia continued its efforts to strengthen the government. During March there was an escalation of airstrikes and operation, as government forces were reported capturing and dismantling militia bases. During April 2026, further escalation was noted of the strikes against militia forces in Somalia.

On 17 March 2026, State President Abdiaziz Laftagareen announced that the South West State had severed ties with the federal government over issues related to Somalia's ongoing constitutional crisis, alleging an attempted coup against him by federal forces. Following clashes within the state, on 30 March federal forces took control of Southwest State's de facto capital Baidoa, with South West President Laftagareen being forced to resign, Ahmed Mohamed Hussein taking his place as the head of the new transitional government. Laftagareen loyalist militias repeatedly launched attacks against Baidoa and Buurhakaba in the months following his removal.

In August 2026, a faction affiliated with the self-proclaimed "Southeast State of Somalia" reportedly entered Merca, capturing the city.

On November 10, suspected members of Al-Shabaab killed 8 civilians in Mandera County, Kenya.

== Foreign involvement ==
=== African Union Mission ===
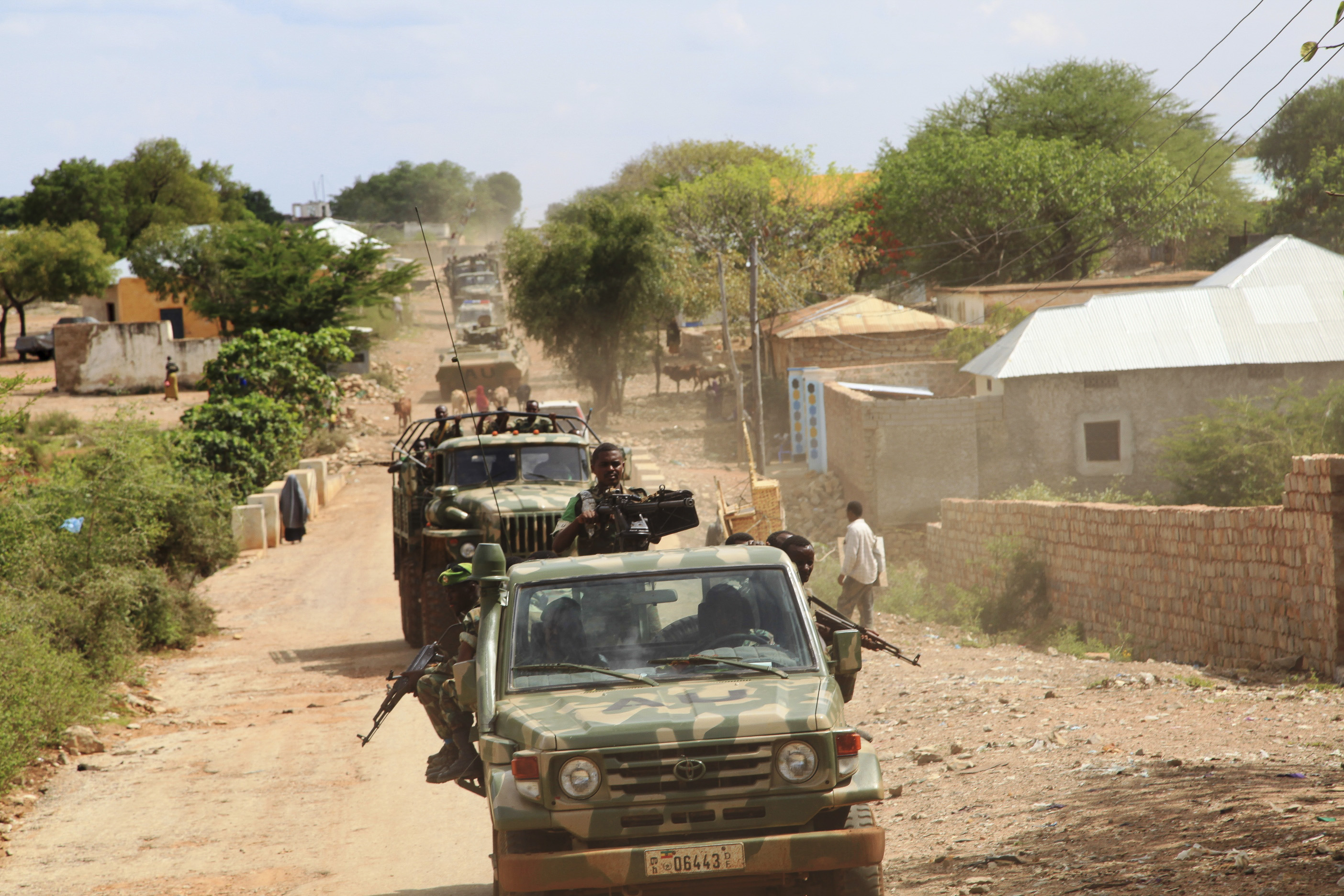
AMISOM reinforcement convoy on the Baidoa-Mogadishu road in April 2014

The African Union has deployed more than 16,000 soldiers to Somalia, mandated to support transitional governmental structures, implement a national security plan, train the Somali security forces, and assist in creating a secure environment for the delivery of humanitarian aid. As part of its duties, AMISOM also supports the Transitional Federal Government's forces in their battle against al-Shabaab militants.

AMISOM was created by the African Union's Peace and Security Council on 19 January 2007 with an initial six-month mandate. On 21 February 2007 the United Nations Security Council approved the mission's mandate. Subsequent six-monthly renewals of AMISOM's mandate by the African Union Peace and Security Council have also been authorised by the United Nations Security Council.

AMISOM's UN mandate was extended for a further six months in August 2008 by UNSCR 1831. The AMISOM's mandate has been extended each period that it has been up for review. It is now set to be reviewed again on 16 January 2013.

On 12 November 2013, the UN Security Council adopted SC Resolution 2124 (2013) extending AMISOM's mandate from 28 February 2014 to 31 October 2014. Acting upon the force's request, the resolution also increases AMISOM's maximum authorized strength from 17,731 to 22,126 troops.

The force, which has fought throughout the country, has reportedly suffered significant casualties during their mission, although no precise figures have been issued by the contributing countries.

In March 2022, the 14-year-long AMISOM mission changed its name to the African Union Transition Mission in Somalia (ATMIS). It was announced that it was hoped that ATMIS's mandate would end in 2024. ATMIS consists of troops from the East African nations of Burundi, Djibouti, Ethiopia, Kenya, and Uganda.

=== United States and United Nations ===
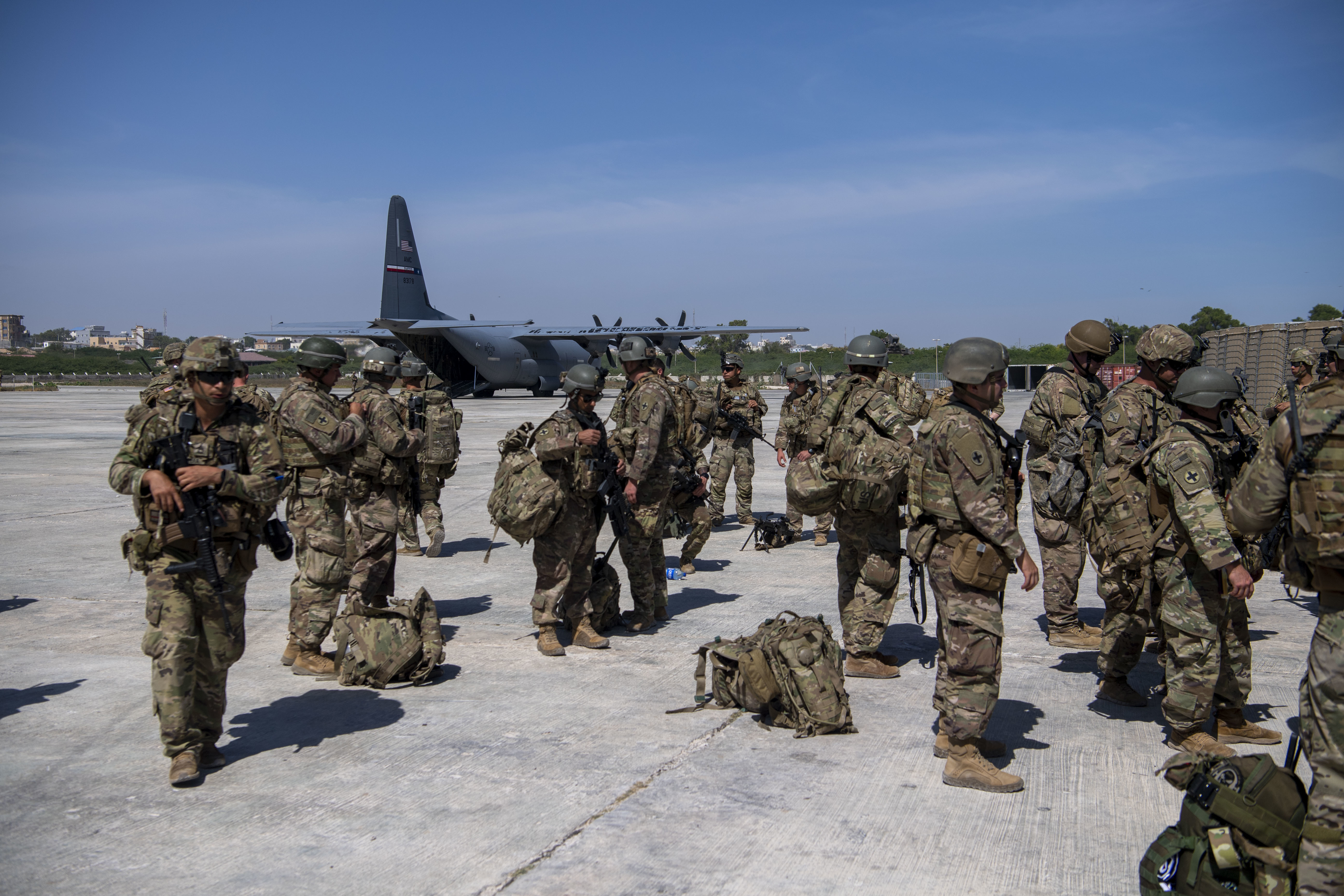
US Army East African Response Force (EARF) soldiers, part of Combined Joint Task Force – Horn of Africa, in Somalia on 21 January 2021

The Government of Somalia has requested U.S. involvement multiple times.

The United Nations Development Programme for Somalia spends about $50 million each year, though these funds are not related to military aid. Instead these programs, such as Employment Generation for Early Recovery (EGER). As of October 2010, the US State Department noted the United States directly obligated over $229 million to support AMISOM, and paid for other UN assistance for the mission indirectly through its obligations to the international body.

In January 2013, the US announced that it was set to exchange diplomatic notes with the new central government of Somalia, re-establishing official ties with the country for the first time in 20 years. According to the Department of State, the decision was made in recognition of the significant progress that the Somali authorities had achieved on both the political and war fronts. The move is expected to grant the Somali government access to new sources of development funds from American agencies as well as international bodies like the International Monetary Fund and World Bank, thereby facilitating the ongoing reconstruction process. In addition to diplomatic ties; roughly 50 US special operations troops operate at undisclosed locations across southern Somalia advising and assisting, Kenyan, Somali and Ugandan forces in their fight against al-Shabaab.

At the behest of the Somali and American federal governments, among other international actors, the United Nations Security Council unanimously approved United Nations Security Council Resolution 2093 during its 6 March 2013 meeting to suspend the 21-year arms embargo on Somalia. The endorsement officially lifts the purchase ban on light weapons for a provisional period of one year, but retains certain restrictions on the procurement of heavy arms such as surface-to-air missiles, howitzers and cannons. On 9 April 2013, the US government likewise approved the provision of defense articles and services by the American authorities to the Somali Federal Government. At the request of the Somali authorities and AMISOM, the US military in late 2013 also established a small team of advisers in Mogadishu to provide consultative and planning support to the allied forces.

The United Kingdom is also involved in combating Islamist extremists in Somalia. Since 2009, members of the Special Air Service and the Special Reconnaissance Regiment have conducted counter-terrorist operations in Somalia from Camp Lemonnier; they have watched Britons believed to be travelling to Somalia for terrorist training and have worked with US counterparts, observing and "targeting" local suspects. They have also been carrying out a similar role in Yemen. In May 2016, it was reported that 70 UK military personnel have arrived in Somalia to counter al-Shabaab as part of a UN peacekeeping mission; ten soldiers will offer medical, engineering and logistical support to AMISOM. Personnel will also be sent to South Sudan to carry out a similar role.

On 16 October 2016, The New York Times reported that American officials said the White House had quietly broadened the president's authority for the use of force in Somalia by allowing airstrikes to protect American and African troops as they combat fighters from al-Shabaab. About 200 to 300 American Special Operations troops work with soldiers from Somalia and other African nations like Kenya and Uganda to carry out more than a half-dozen raids per month, according to senior American military officials. The operations are a combination of ground raids and drone strikes. SEAL Team 6 has been heavily involved in many of these operations. American military officials said once ground operations are complete, American troops working with Somali forces often interrogate prisoners at temporary screening facilities, including one in Puntland, before the detainees are transferred to more permanent Somali-run prisons. The Pentagon has only acknowledged a small fraction of these operations, announcing 13 ground raids and airstrikes so far in 2016 (three of which took place in September)—up from five in 2015; according to data compiled by New America (a Washington think tank), the strikes have killed about 25 civilians and 200 people suspected of being militants. At a former Russian fighter jet base in Baledogle, US Marines and private contractors are working to build up a Somali military unit designed to combat al-Shabaab throughout the country.

On 30 March 2017, CNN reported that US President Donald Trump signed off a decision by the White House which approved a new strategy granting AFRICOM the authority to step up counterterrorism strikes in Somalia; under the new strategy, the US military will now be able to conduct precision airstrikes in support of the Somali National Army and AMISOM forces. The new authorization designates some regions of Somalia as an "area of active hostilities," freeing counterterrorism strikes there from restrictions governing other strikes outside the areas; an official said that the designated areas will not include Mogadishu and Puntland. Captain Jeff Davis, a Pentagon spokesman, said that "The additional support provided by this authority will help deny al-Shabaab safe havens from which it could attack US citizens or US interests in the region." Another official said that the legal basis for the new authority is the 2001 AUMF. In mid-April 2017, it was reported that 40 soldiers from the 101st Airborne Division were deployed to Somalia on 2 April 2017 to improve the capabilities of the Somalia Army in combating Islamist militants. AFRICOM stated that the troops would focus on bolstering the Somali army's logistics capabilities; an AFRICOM spokesman said that "This mission is not associated with teaching counterextremism tactics" and that the Somali government requested the training.

On 16 June 2020, Human Rights Watch revealed the inconsistency in the investigation by the US authorities into a 2 February airstrike, which killed one woman. And a 10 March attack that killed five men, including a child.

President Donald Trump ordered the Department of Defense to remove the majority of the 700 US military troops in Somalia from the country in December 2020. On 16 May 2022, it was announced that President Joe Biden was reversing President Trump's withdrawal and sending up to 450 ground troops back into Somalia.

=== Ethiopia ===
==== 2009 ====
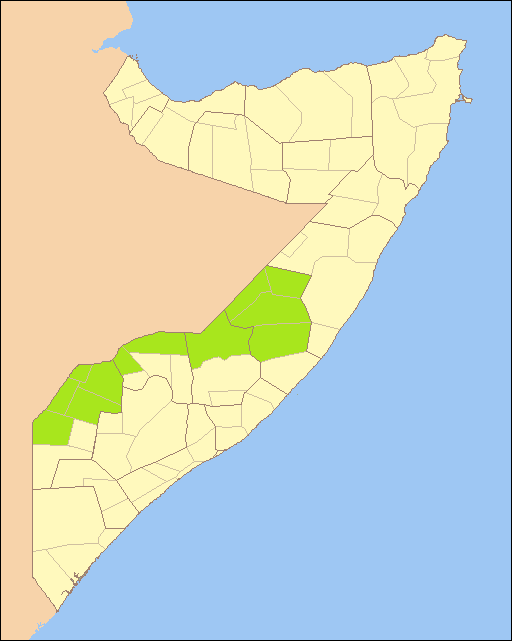
Area of Ethiopian operations in Somalia since their official withdrawal in January 2009.

On 16 February, Somali MP Mohamud Sayid Adan, former Mogadishu mayor Mohamed Omar Habeeb and local police officer Hassan Dhicisow, were arrested by Ethiopian forces in the town of Dolow in Gedo region.

On 28 May, two Ethiopian soldiers, an Ethiopian civilian, two Somali soldiers, four Somali civilians (working for the government) and four Somali insurgents were killed when insurgents attacked a convoy carrying Omar Hashi Aden, who was returning from his visit to Ethiopia.

On 31 May, Ethiopian forces launched search and seizure operations in Hiraan, in Kalaberyr village, near Beledweyn.

On 12 June, Ethiopian forces with several battle wagons entered Balanbal town in Galgudud and set up military bases.

On 14 June, the Ethiopian military said it had come to fight foreign mujahedin, which the military described as "foreign enemies of Ethiopia and Somalia," and launched operations to search for them in Balanbal town, which they control. Sheik Hassan Ya'qub Ali, head of the information affairs for Islamic administration in Kisimayo warned the Ethiopians that "there is no candy and dates to eat from here in Somalia. But the men who chased you forcibly from the country are here in Somalia."

The suicide bombing on 18 June targeted a meeting between TFG and Ethiopian commanders.

On 19 June, Ethiopian forces entered Bakool and reached Elberde town. They withdrew after holding talks with local clan elders.

On 22 June, Ethiopian forces started launching search and seizure operations in Kala-beyrka intersection in Hiran region.

The Ethiopian government then announced it would not intervene without an international mandate.

On 30 June, Ethiopian forces entered El-gal and Ilka'adde villages, which are less than 20 km north of regional capital Beledweyn. Reports from the Kala-beyrka intersection say that more troops from Ethiopia crossed from the border.

On 4 July, Ethiopians withdrew from their bases in Banabal town in Galgudug.

On 18 July, Ethiopian forces vacated their bases in Yed Village in insurgent-controlled Bakool region.

During the weekend of 29–30 August, Ethiopian forces advanced to Beledweyne, supporting a government offensive on the insurgent part of Beledweyne. They withdrew on 31 August. The assault on Beledweyne by government forces came as the TFG governor of Hiraan (belonging to Sharif Ahmed's ARS-Djibouti faction), Sheikh Abdirahman Ibrahim Ma'ow, which controls the other part of Beledweyne, withdrew his administration's support for the TFG.

==== 2010 ====
19 March, Mohammed wali Odowa, spokesman of Hizbul Islam's Hiraan administration in Beledweyne, threatened that Hizbul Islam forces would attack any Ethiopian forces which entered Hizbul Islam controlled territories in Hiraan.

20 May, Ethiopian forces seized control of the previously al-Shabaab held towns of Yeed and Elbarde, in Bakool region. al-Shabaab had captured Elbarde from the TFG on 20 April.

On 18 July, Ethiopian forces withdrew from all their bases in Hiraan and Bakool regions. Ethiopian forces had held these territories for two months, during which they clashed several times with al-Shabaab forces, which control most of Hiraan. Before they withdrew, they released over 20 lorries which used to travel between the South and Central regions of Somalia.

On 1 August, 27,000 Ethiopian troops entered Somalia through the border town of Dolo, where 6,000 Ethiopian forces are based. They advanced deep into the Gedo region in the direction of the towns of Beledehawa and Elwak, accompanied by militia of pro-Ethiopian Somali faction leaders. In Hiraan, Ethiopian forces which entered along with TFG-forces exchanged fire with al-Shabaab militants and advanced until the Kalaber junction, near Beledweyne. The Ethiopian troops then withdrew to Ferfer.

On 29 August, there was a second Ethiopian incursion. A large number of Ethiopian forces in military vehicles, accompanied by highly trained TFG forces, entered several villages in the al-Shabaab-controlled Hiraan region. This came at a time when al-Shabaab militants regularly ventured near the border. Hussein Abdallah, an ASWJ loyalist claimed that the movements were a preliminary action to signal that Ethiopian authorities are able of weakening the Islamist insurgents, to al-Shabaab's leadership.

On 1 September, Ethiopian forces moved deeper into Gedo region, via Dolow, entering the TFG-held village of Yeed. TFG officials in the region reported they were planning to capture the entire Bay and Bakool regions from al-Shabaab.

On 30 December, TFG forces clashed with Ethiopian troops in the Jawil district, near Beledweyne, after Ethiopian forces took a TFG soldier into custody. One TFG soldier and one civilian were injured in the clashes.

==== 2011 ====
On 3 January, Ahlu Sunna Waljamaa official Sheikh Abdi Badel Sheikh Abdullahi, complained about Ethiopian forces in the town of Dolo, in Gedo region. The town is controlled by 300 ASWJ and TFG forces, but it is also home to several Ethiopian military bases. Ethiopian forces had called on ASWJ fighters in the district to lay down their arms. According to a TFG official, three Ethiopian commanders had then come to the town of Dolo and ordered TFG forces to disarm. Ethiopian troops then disarmed a number of TFG and ASWJ forces. Sheikh Abdullahi alleged that Ethiopian forces were doing this because they were outraged by ASWJ's military capability.

On 19 November, eyewitnesses reported a large number of Ethiopian troops crossing into Somalia. Ethiopian authorities denied this.

After a multinational conference held on 25 November in Addis Ababa, IGAD announced that the Ethiopian government had agreed to support the allied forces' campaign against al-Shabaab.

On 31 December 2011, the Transitional Federal Government soldiers and around 3,000 allied Ethiopian army troops attacked Beledweyne in the early morning, capturing it after hours of fighting. They later took control of Baidoa, among other areas.

==== 2012 ====
On 22 October 2012, the Spokesman of the African Union Mission to Somalia (AMISOM), Col. Ali Aden Humed, speaking to journalists in Mogadishu on Saturday, said that Ethiopian forces present in parts of the regions of Somalia will soon pull out from the country. The spokesman said AMISOM troops will take over the areas where Ethiopian forces are holding at the moment. "The plan by AMISOM is to take over the positions held by Ethiopian forces in parts of the regions of the country; Ethiopian troops will soon retreat back to their position along Somalia border," said Col. Ali Aden Humed.

==== 2013 ====
In 2013, Ethiopian Foreign Minister Tedros Adhanom announced that Ethiopian troops were pulling out of Baidoa as the situation on the ground was relatively stable and the Somali military and AMISOM forces were now able to assume security duties. The withdrawal was well planned and coordinated. Adhanom added that a pullout could have occurred twelve months earlier, but the allied forces were at the time unprepared to take over, so the move was postponed. Additionally, he asserted that Eritrea was attempting to destabilize Somalia and environs, and that the international community should take the situation seriously since Eritrea was also still allegedly supporting al-Shabaab. Following the Westgate shooting in Nairobi by al-Shabaab operatives, the Ethiopian government halted its plans to withdraw completely out of Somalia. In November 2013, the Ethiopian government announced that it would integrate its troops that are deployed in Somalia into the AMISOM multinational force. Somalia's Foreign Minister Fowzia Haji Yussuf welcomed the decision, stating that the move would galvanize AMISOM's campaign against the insurgent group. She also emphasized the importance of collaboration between Somalia and Ethiopia. The Ethiopian authorities' announcement came a month after a failed October bombing attempt by al-Shabaab in the Ethiopian capital of Addis Ababa, and a week after Ethiopia received a renewed terrorism threat from the insurgent group. According to Ethiopian Ministry of Foreign Affairs spokesperson Ambassador Dina Mufti, the Ethiopian military's decision to join AMISOM is intended to render the peacekeeping operation more secure. Analysts also suggested that the move was primarily motivated by financial considerations, with the Ethiopian forces' operational costs now slated to be under AMISOM's allowance budget. It is believed that the Ethiopian military's long experience in Somali territory, its equipment such as helicopters, and the potential for closer coordination will help the allied forces advance their territorial gains. On the other hand, there is a certain amount of unease following Ethiopia's entry into AMISOM given local animosity originating from Ethiopia's heavy handed intervention in 2006. There are also fears that al-Shabaab could use Somali animosity towards Ethiopia as a rallying cry and to recruit more members. It is also believed that some Ethiopian troops in Somalia operate independently from AMISOM.

==== 2014 ====
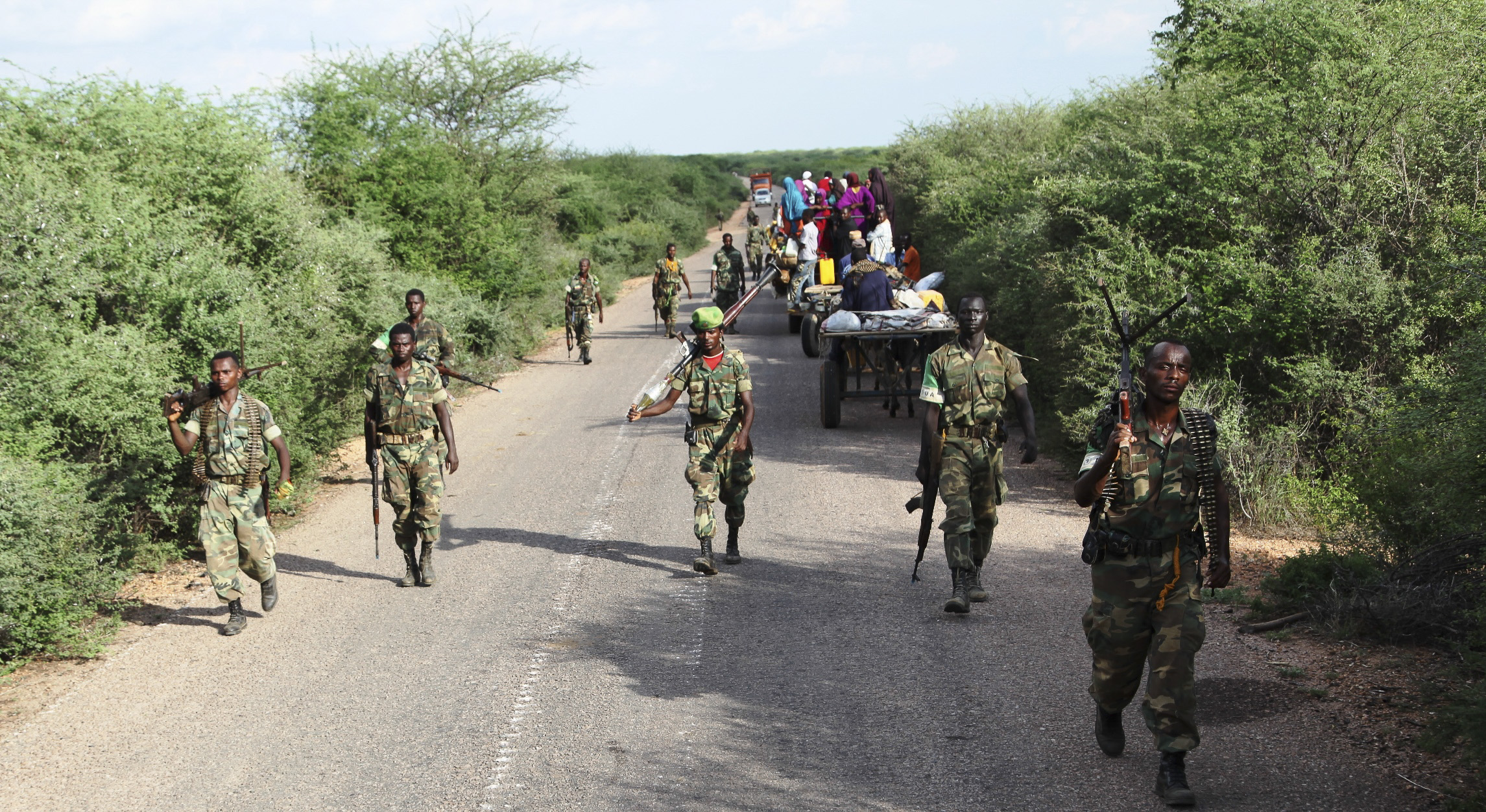
Ethiopian troops in Somalia, 2014

In December 2014, the Ethiopian government offered to replace the last AMISOM contingent from Sierra Leone with fresh Ethiopian military reinforcements.

==== 2020 ====
On 4 May 2020, an East African Express Airways Embraer EMB 120 Brasilia airliner on an air charter flight delivering COVID-19 pandemic relief supplies crashed on approach to Berdale, Somalia, killing all 2 crew and 4 non-revenue passengers on board. On 10 May, a leaked AMISOM report alleged that ground troops of the Ethiopian National Defense Force operating outside AMISOM authority had shot the aircraft down, mistakenly believing it was undertaking a suicide attack. This allegation ignited renewed controversy over unauthorized Ethiopian incursions into Somalia to fight al-Shabaab. Ethiopian, Kenyan and Somali authorities have initiated a joint investigation of the accident.

=== Kenya ===
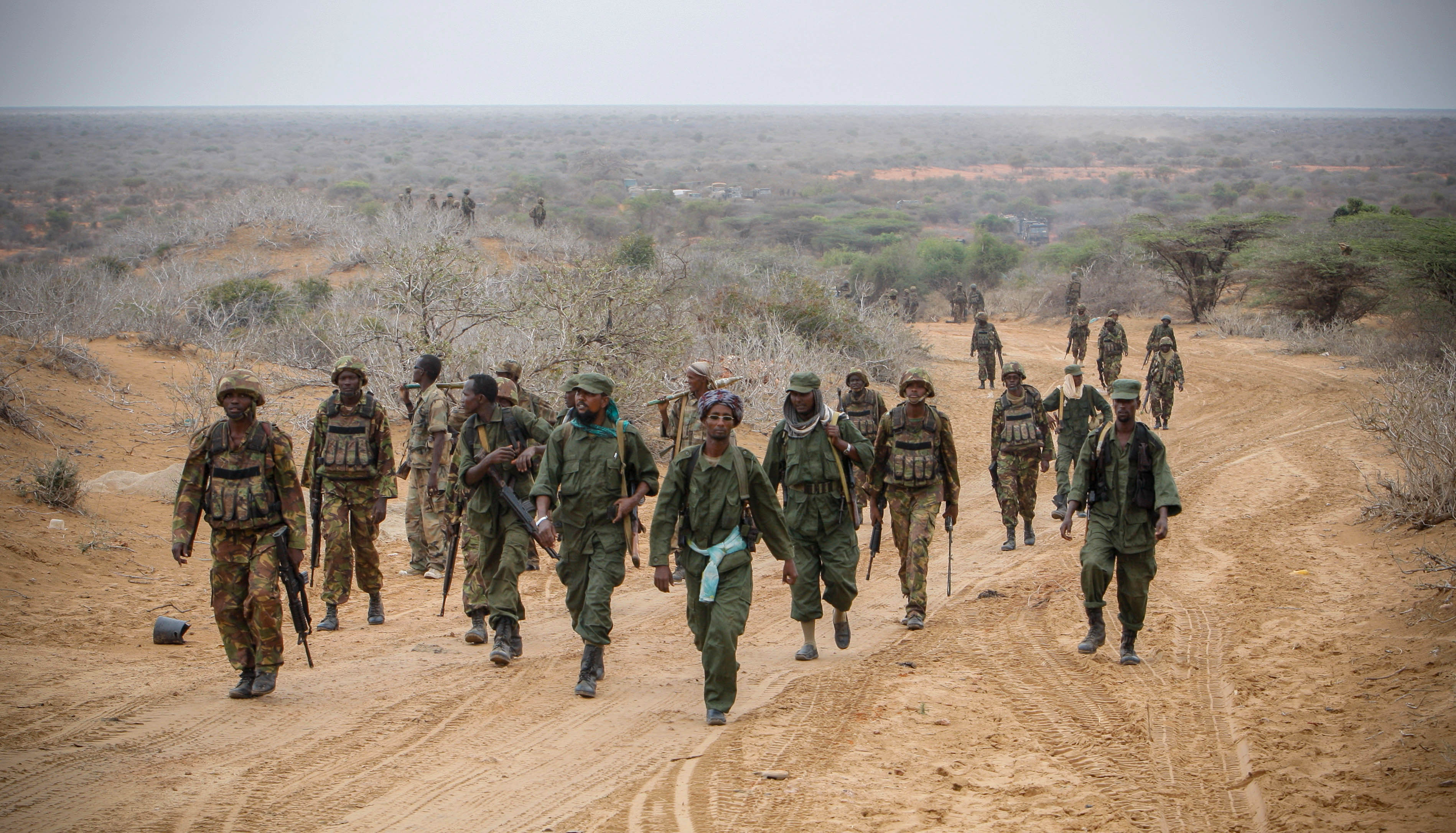
Kenyan soldiers and fighters of the Ras Kamboni Brigades, a Somali government-allied militia, 2012

==== Recruitment from Kenya ====
According to press reports, Somali and Kenyan government officials have recruited and trained Somali refugees in Kenya and Kenyan nationals who are ethnic Somalis to fight insurgents in Somalia. However, the Somali chief of military staff and spokesmen from the Kenyan government have denied this.

==== 2010 Kenya–al-Shabaab border clash ====
On 20 July 2010, border clashes between Kenya and al-Shabaab insurgents occurred when gunmen from the militia attacked a Kenyan border patrol along the border area in Liboi, Lagdera. There was a subsequent fierce exchange of fire between the two sides, leading to the deaths of 2 militia members and the wounding of one Kenyan officer. Hundreds of security personnel were later deployed to the border following the clash and because of continued fighting between two militia groups in the neighbouring town of Dobley, Somalia. al-Shabaab had previously claimed responsibility for a deadly suicide bombing in Uganda in July.

==== Operation Linda Nchi ====
In October 2011, the Kenya Defence Forces began Operation Linda Nchi against al-Shabaab in southern Somalia. The mission was officially led by the Somali armed forces, with the Kenyan armed forces providing supporting role. In early June 2012, Kenyan forces were formally integrated into AMISOM.

==== Camp Simba attack ====
On 5 January 2020, al-Shabaab militants launched an attack on Camp Simba at Manda Air Strip used by Kenyan and US troops in Lamu County, Kenya. The attack was repelled, leaving three American nationals killed: one serviceman and two contractors. Four militants died in the attack, and five were arrested. Moreover, six aircraft and land vehicles were destroyed or damaged at the airstrip. Some of the airframes lost included a De Havilland Canada Dash 8 and two helicopters.

== Piracy ==
Government officials from the Galmudug administration in the north-central Hobyo district also reportedly attempted to use pirate gangs as a bulwark against Islamist insurgents from southern Somalia's conflict zones. Other pirates are alleged to have reached agreements of their own with the Islamist groups, although a senior commander from the Hizbul Islam militia vowed to eradicate piracy by imposing sharia law when his group briefly took control of Harardhere in May 2010 and drove out the local pirates.

== See also ==
- American military intervention in Somalia (2007–present)
- Democracy in Africa
- Elections in Somalia
- Elections in Somaliland
- List of wars: 2003–present
