= 2021 Mogadishu bombing =

2021 Mogadishu bombing may refer to:

- March 2021 Mogadishu bombing
- June 2021 Mogadishu bombing
- November 2021 Mogadishu bombing
