= 2024 Mogadishu market bombing =

Four bombings in Somalia

- Part of Somali Civil War (2009–present)
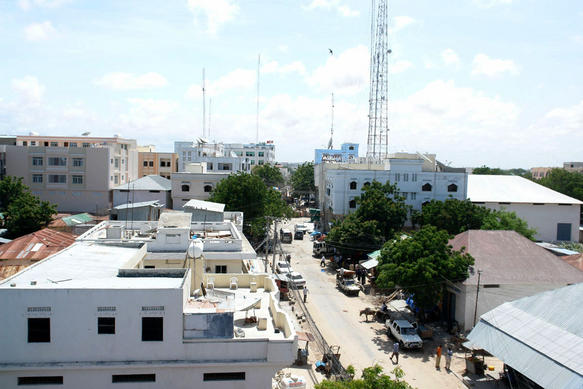
- The Bakaara Market in 2005
- Native name: Weeraradii Suuqa Bakaaraha
- Location: 2°2′56.04″N 45°19′12″E; Mogadishu, Somalia
- Date: 6 February 2024; 2 years ago
- Target: Bakaara Market
- Attack type: Bombings
- Deaths: 10
- Injuries: 20+
- Perpetrator: Al-Shabaab suspected.

On 6 February 2024, four bombings inside the Bakaara Market in the Somali capital Mogadishu killed at least ten people and injured over twenty others.

The market targeted sold goods, services, firearms and daily essentials such as petrol, food, wheat, medicine, clothes and electronics. The market also is famous for illicit activities, such as selling forged passports, forged university diplomas and forged birth certificates. The victims of the bombings were sent to the Erdoğan Hospital.

== Background ==
The Bakaara Market is a popular market in Mogadishu, the capital of Somalia. The market has been targeted in an attack at least once before by the militant group Al-Shabaab during the civil war on October 15, 2009, in which 20 people were killed and 58 others were injured after a shelling attack.

== Bombings ==
At around 2:50 p.m. a series of bombings occurred in four places at the center of the crowded market. The first bombing killed two employees, followed by the other bombings, which killed eight shoppers and workers.

== Aftermath ==
Ten people were killed in the bombings. Over twenty people who were injured during the bombings were admitted to the Erdoğan Hospital facility, according to three nurses. No group claimed responsibility for the bombings, although Al-Shabaab is suspected.

== Reactions ==
Hassan Ali, a trader at the market, stated "I have counted 10 dead people and 15 others injured. My shop is completely destroyed."

The Government of Somalia had no immediate comment on the bombing.

The National Intelligence and Security Agency launched a nationwide plea for assistance of identifying six people who are the suspects behind the bombing. NISA released photos of the six individuals who are the suspected perpetrators of the bombing. NISA also stated, “The security agencies are actively searching for the individuals behind the tragic incidents in Bakara Market. We appeal to the public for any information that can lead to their apprehension.”

Banadir region's Deputy Governor, Mohamed Ahmed Diriye, claimed the attacks were not mortar attacks, but were planted explosives.

== See also ==
Other bombings in Mogadishu in 2024

- 2024 Lido Beach attack
- 2024 Mogadishu SYL Hotel attack and siege
- Top Coffee bombing
- 2024 Mogadishu tea shop bombing
