= Nur Matan Abdi =

Somali politician and military commander

Nur Matan Abdi is a Somali politician and military commander who served in the Transitional Federal Parliament of Somalia in the 2000s. He was one of the commanders of the Somali National Army during the 2009 phase of the Somali Civil War. In 2011, he led government forces in a battle against al-Shabaab militants in Garbahare, pushing the militants out of the city.

In 2000, Abdi was the district commissioner of the Beled Hawo District.
