= Jazeera Palace Hotel bombing =

2015 suicide bombing in Somalia

- Part of Somali Civil War (2009–present)
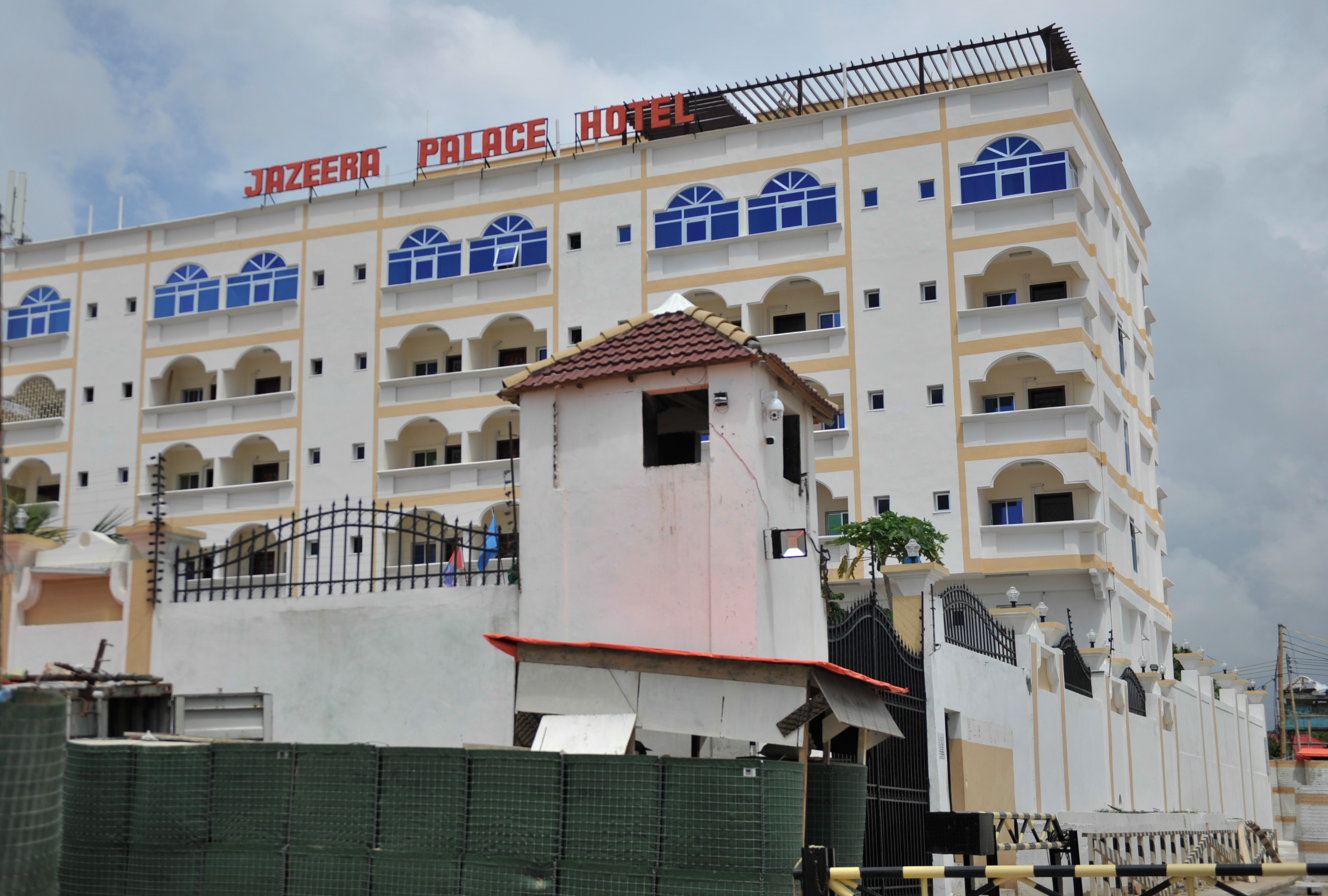
- Jazeera Palace Hotel, renovated months after the attacks.
- Location: Mogadishu, Somalia
- Date: July 26, 2015
- Attack type: Suicide bombing
- Deaths: 10-15+
- Injuries: Several
- Perpetrator: al-Shabab

On July 26, 2015, the Jazeera Palace Hotel in Mogadishu, Somalia was struck by a suicide bomber driving a vehicle packed with explosives. At least 15 people were killed, including Chinese People's Armed Police Staff Sergeant Zhang Nan on guard duty at the Chinese Embassy. Al-Shabab claimed responsibility for the attack.

== Events ==
On July 10, 2015, Shabab had attacked two hotels and a stadium housing peacekeepers. The two hotels, Hotel Weheliye and Hotel Siyad, were targeted by car bombs.

The heavily guarded hotel was regarded as secure and favored by diplomats and high-ranking government officials.

The Jazeera Palace Hotel bombing by al Shabaab was endorsed by the Turkistan Islamic Party
