= Camp Simba attack =

Attack by Al-Shabaab, Somali Islamist insurgents on 5 January 2020

- Part of the War in Somalia
Date	5 January 2020
Location	Lamu County, Kenya
Result	Al-Shabaab victory

Belligerents
United States; Kenya	al-Qaeda; al-Shabaab

Strength
(United States) ~100 (Kenya) Unknown	(Al-Shabaab (militant group)) ~30–40 militants

Casualties and losses
(United States) 1 soldier, 2 contractors killed 5 aircraft destroyed 1 aircraft damaged 2 Oshkosh M-ATV several fuel tanker destroyed (Kenya) None	5 killed 5 arrested Unknown wounded

The Camp Simba attack was a pre-dawn attack at Magagoni Airfield near Camp Simba on 5 January 2020. The camp is used by Kenyan and U.S. troops and is located near Manda Bay on the mainland of Lamu County, Kenya. The perpetrators were al-Shabaab, a Somalia-based Islamic extremist insurgent group. Approximately 30-40 al-Shabaab militants assaulted Camp Simba, which was home to around 100 US personnel along with an undisclosed number of Kenyan troops. It was the first al-Shabaab targeting of US military personnel in Kenya.

The timing of the attack coincided with recent Iranian threats of retaliation to target US troops in response to the US assassination of Iranian General Qasem Soleimani in the 2020 Baghdad International Airport airstrike. However, al-Shabaab claimed no link between their decision to attack and to those events.

== The raid ==
Cooperative Security Location (CSL) Manda Bay has three main parts: Kenyan Naval Base Manda Bay, Camp Simba, the U.S. "base within a base" where most U.S. forces are housed and work, and nearby Magagoni Airfield. The attack occurred at Magagoni Airfield, a joint-use installation, approximately a mile south of Camp Simba.

The raid began at 0520 hours with an al-Shabaab attack on the Manda Air Strip targeting a taxiing Beechcraft King Air 350 surveillance plane with rocket-propelled grenade (RPGs). Two American contractors flying for L3 Technologies, employed by the US Department of Defense, were killed in this initial attack and a third injured. A US army soldier acting as air traffic controller from a truck was killed in the ensuing gunfight that erupted after the attack on the plane.

Kenya Defence Forces personnel responded first to the attack and attempted to repulse the militants. With the support of Department of Defense personnel and a Kenyan MD500 attack helicopter, the combined forces conducted an assault to secure the airfield while a squad from the Kenya Ranger Regiment cleared the perimeter. The fighting continued for around an hour and the al-Shabaab attack was repelled. Five al-Shabaab militants died in the attack and five were arrested, according to the Kenya Defence Forces and United States Africa Command (AFRICOM).

In the raid, al-Shabaab targeted vehicles and aircraft at the airstrip with RPGs, In the attack two Oshkosh M-ATV were destroyed, Five aircraft and helicopters were destroyed, one aircraft was damaged, and several fuel tankers. Some of the airframes lost included a De Havilland Canada Dash 8 and two helicopters operated by US contractors. The Havilland Dash 8 was in use as a spy plane, and was configured for intelligence, surveillance, and reconnaissance missions in the region. As a result of the significant aircraft losses, AFRICOM admitted that al-Shabaab had "achieved a degree of success in its attack."

== Participation of Kenyan forces ==
According to The New York Times, an investigation based on eyewitness reports revealed that the Kenyan troops stationed at the Manda Air Strip hid in grass fields during the attack. This was denied by the Kenya Defence Forces.

An independent review of the attack by the Pentagon credited the role of Kenya Defence Force, Kenya Navy and Kenya Ranger Regiment members in responding to the attack of their own accord and assaulting enemy positions. KDF personnel with the support of a Kenyan McDonnell Douglas MD 500 Defender helicopter gunship took the lead in clearing a hangar and suppressing al-Shabaab positions. The review contradicts earlier reports by The New York Times and cites operational failures by US military forces.

== Aftermath ==
In the early morning hours of 6 January 2020, US Army Soldiers of Easy Company, 2nd Battalion, 506th Infantry Regiment "White Currahee", 3rd Brigade Combat Team, 101st Airborne Division, that had been based out of nearby Camp Lemonnier, Djibouti as part of the East Africa Response Force (EARF), arrived to bolster perimeter defense and troop numbers. This was done in the event of another attack, however, another would not happen.

Along with claiming to have inflicted 40 casualties on US forces, al-Shabaab claimed to have killed US General Stephen J. Townsend in their raid, however, this claim was dismissed by AFRICOM.

In response to the raid, on 9 January AFRICOM sent two of its senior military officers to oversee a formal investigation.

On 22 February 2020, AFRICOM claimed to have killed the al-Shabaab commander who had planned the attack, but did not provide any names; the rebels did not confirm any losses among its leadership at the time.
