= Beled Hawo District =

Beled Hawo
- District
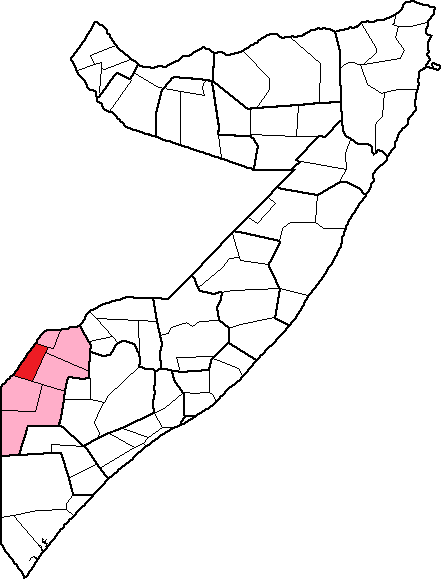
- Country: Somalia
- Region: Gedo
- Capital: Beled Hawo

Population (2021)
  - Total: 600,000/750,000
- Time zone: UTC+3 (EAT)
- Postal code: 252

Beled Hawo District (Somali: Degmada Beled Xaawo) district in the southwestern Gedo region of Somalia. Its capital is Beled Hawo.

In 2000, the district commissioner was Nur Matan Abdi.
