= Battle of Osweyne =

Major battle between Al-Shabaab and the Somali National Army

- Part of Somali Civil War (2009–present)
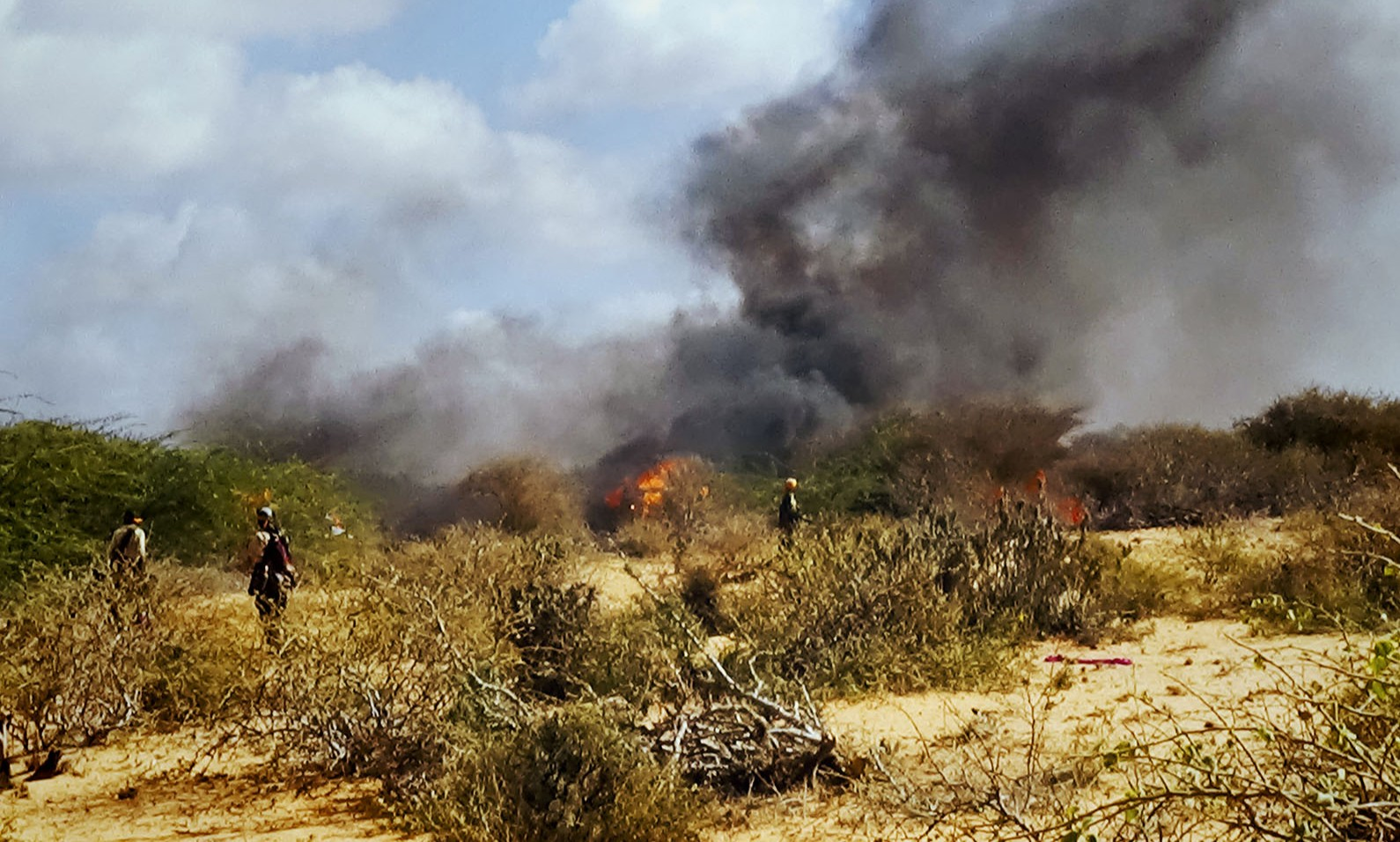
- Al-Shabaab insurgents assaulting Somali National Army positions at Osweyne
Date	26 August 2023
Location	Osweyne, Galmudug
Result	Decisive Al-Shabaab victory: Somali National Army retreats on Galmudug state front line; Overall counterinsurgency offensive against Al-Shabaab stalls

Belligerents
al-Shabaab	Federal Government of Somalia

Commanders and leaders
	Shaah Macabe (MIA)

Strength
Unknown	2,000 SNA troops

Casualties and losses
190± killed (Somali gov claim)	100+ killed (Independent claims); 130 killed (SNA claim); 178 killed (Insurgent claim) 40 vehicles, including APCs captured by insurgents

The Battle of Osweyne also known as Osweyne debacle was a major military engagement fought on 26 August 2023 between the Somali National Army (SNA) and the insurgent group Al-Shabaab in Galgaduud region, central Somalia. The battle occurred during the second phase of a government-led counterinsurgency campaign, which aimed to expel Al-Shabaab from rural strongholds.

Al-Shabaab launched a coordinated counterattack on an SNA encampment in Osweyne, exploiting poor logistical preparation and low morale among government forces. The battle resulted in a significant defeat for the SNA, with heavy casualties and a collapse of front line positions in the region. It was among the deadliest single attacks against Somali government troops in recent years and marked a major turning point in offensive operations against the insurgency.

The battle exposed serious deficiencies in military planning, intelligence, and command coordination within the SNA, prompting widespread criticism of the Federal Government of Somalia's handling of the offensive.

== Background ==
During the summer of 2023, offensive operations against Al-Shabaab began stalling. On 6 August, the Federal Government of Somalia (FGS) announced the second phase of its military offensive, focusing on the Galgaduud and Middle Shabelle regions. Two weeks before the battle of Osweyne, Somali President Hassan Sheikh Mohamud declared at a town hall meeting in Dhusamareb on 17 August his administration planned to “eliminate Al-Shabaab from the country in the coming five months,”

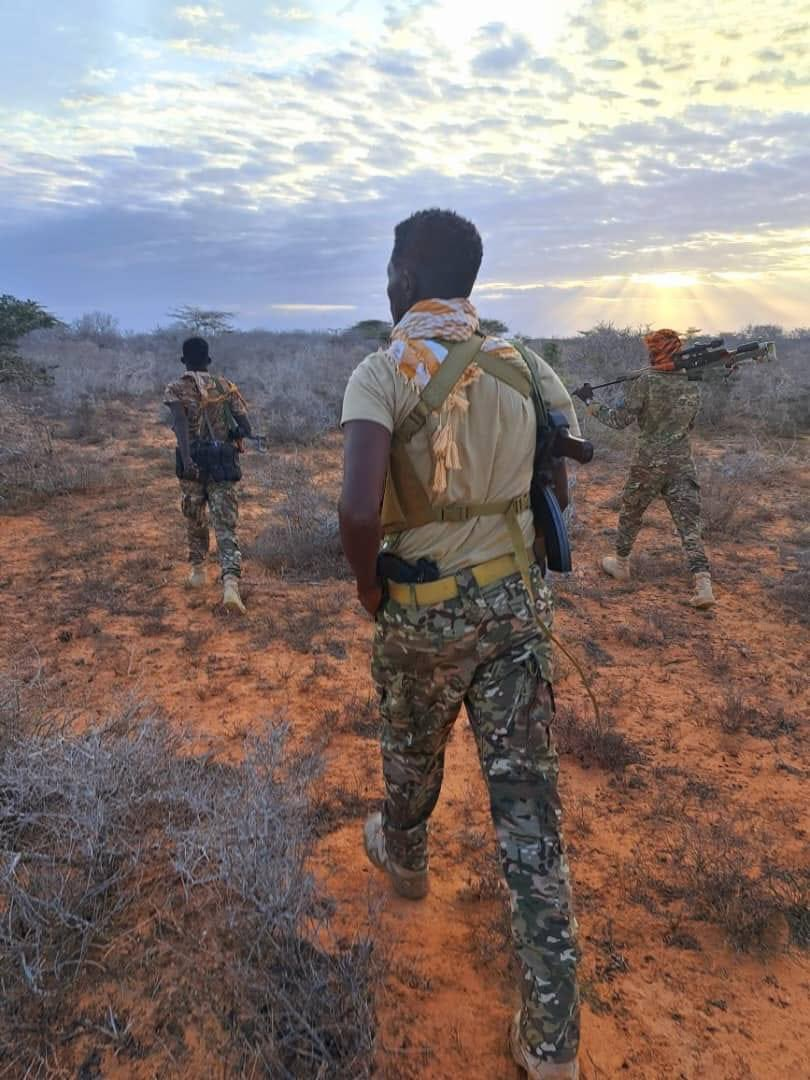
SNA troops capturing Osweyne (22 August)

On 22 August, the Somali National Army (SNA) seized Osweyne in Galmudug region. SNA forces were overextended as the position was deep in Al-Shabaab held territory. Most local civilians had fled the nearby town as it was captured, many seeking refuge with al-Shabaab fighters.

=== Osweyne camp ===
At Osweyne in Galgaduud, a military camp had been set up for operations in the region. Around 2,000 SNA troops had gathered, though poorly prepared. Poor military logistics, planning and leadership had plagued counterinsurgency operations prior to the battle.

The day before the battle, SNA troops were suffering from low morale. The situation deteriorated to the point where a munity was staged, but a popular commander named Mukhtar Hassan Tifow of the elite Umar Bin-Khadab calmed down the troops by saying supplies and fuel were on its way.

But as we got settled at the military camp, we realized that none of the military vehicles and battle wagons had fuel in them. Not even a drop of fuel...This led to frustration and outright anger with us [the troops] and our commanders. To make matters worse, the troops were short on supplies, including ammunition.

— 20-year-old SNA soldier named Sharmarke Hersi, describing the army position at Osweyne.

Immediately after the area had been taken by the SNA on 22 August the insurgents began surrounding the army position and cut off the supply line. The day before the battle insurgents had targeted an SNA convoy heading for nearby El Buur, killing dozens of troops. Al-Shabaab reportedly had "excellent intelligence" about SNA force dispositions at Osweyne and planned their tactics to focus on their defensive weaknesses.

== Battle ==
=== Insurgent attack ===
Not long after army commander Mukhtar Hassan Tifow had calmed down the munity over the logistics situation, at around six in the morning on Saturday 26 August, Al-Shabaab forces opened the battle with a car bomb and ground assault on SNA positions. Intense fighting followed.

Gunfire and explosions first erupted from all four corners of the military camp, with four back-to-back explosions. The disorganized and poorly equipped SNA troops rallied to the defense and attempted to repel the Al-Shabaab ground assault. Despite having numerical superiority over the insurgents, due to their poorly prepared defensive positions, many soldiers panicked when the attack came and retreated. The majority fought on despite calls for reinforcements going unanswered and ammunition depleting. Many soldiers fought down to their last bullets.

=== SNA retreat and recapture ===
As they ran out of ammunition, many SNA troops discarded their weapons and uniforms, then retreated into the bush from pursuing insurgents. Al-Shabaab fighters seized the Osweyne camp and captured several SNA prisoners of war. Large amounts of vehicles were captured by Al-Shabaab fighters, but most the operable armored personnel carriers (APCs) the SNA had left behind were destroyed by helicopter gunships.

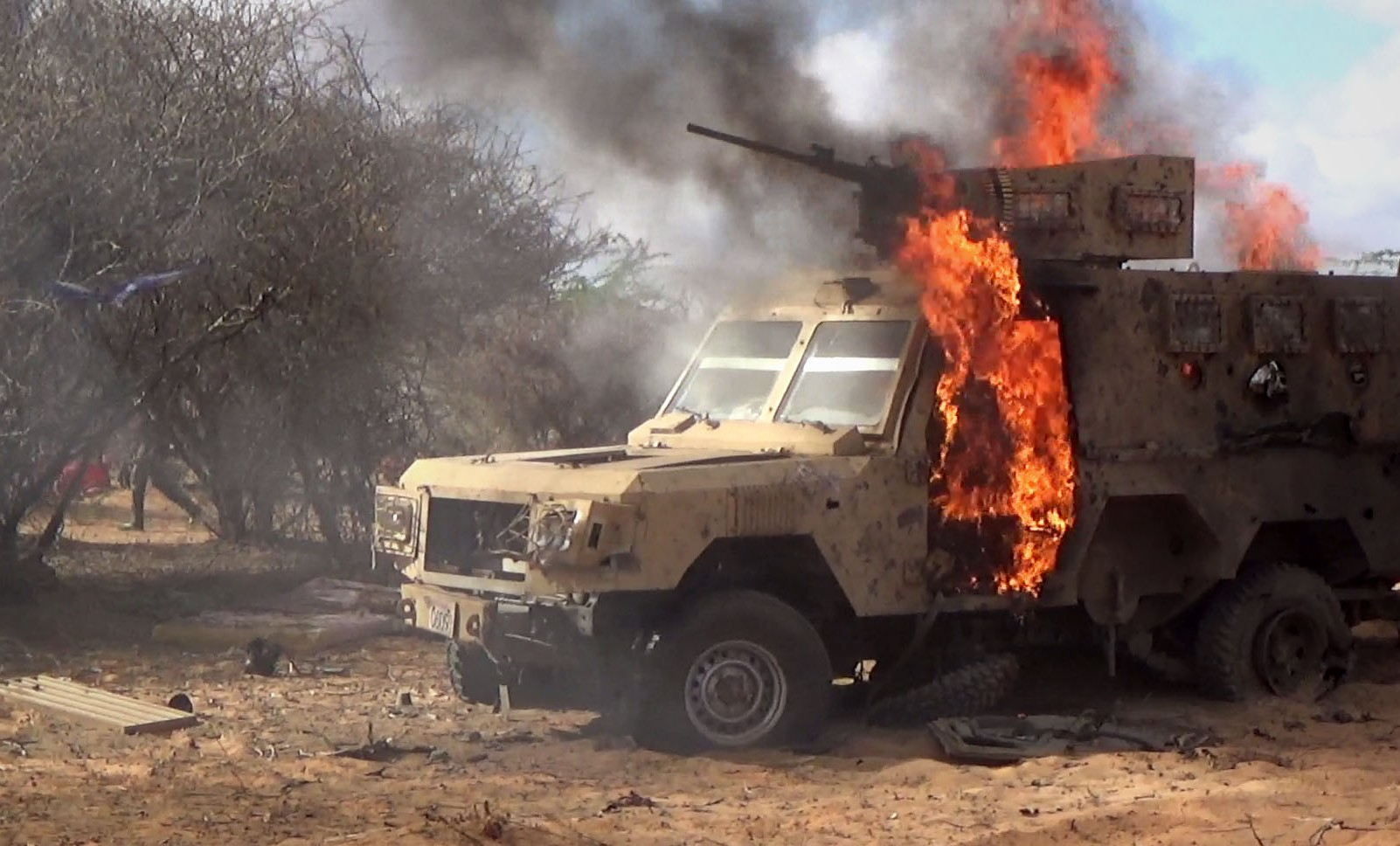
Somali National Army APC destroyed during the battle

Some SNA forces retreating from the battlefield hid from their own government helicopters, as they feared friendly fire as they were known to often not differentiate between civilians and insurgents. Due to the heavy Al-Shabaab presence in the area and the absence of coordinated reinforcements, SNA forces remained scattered and vulnerable in the aftermath of the battle.

The following day the SNA soldiers that had been dispersed returned to the ruined site of the camp. Government reinforcements arrived with air support and the soldiers who had survived the battle were directed to create makeshift mass graves to bury the dead. Witnesses reported that bodies were hastily disposed of without proper identification or burial procedures. The scale of the losses, combined with the conditions in which the dead were handled, drew criticism and raised questions about the preparedness and logistical failures of the Somali military.

== Casualties ==
It is unknown exactly how many SNA troops and Al-Shabaab insurgents were killed. According to Africa Confidential, possibly several hundred SNA had died. According to an anonymous army officer, 130 soldiers had been killed. Al-Shabaab claimed that 178 SNA troops had been killed. President Mohamud asserted 190 insurgents had been killed, and falsely claimed Al-Shabaab fighters had been killed in such numbers that they were buried in mass graves. SNA soldiers who had survived the battle reported that army troops who had been killed were buried in mass graves after the battle. Due to the ubiquitous nature of cell phones and social media in Somalia, the reality of the army losses was soon widely shared - weakening the morale of SNA and Macwisley fighters.

Claims by the Federal Government of Somalia and Al-Shabaab could not be independently verified.

== Aftermath and consequences ==
Initially both sides claimed victory, but the battle was a "severe defeat" for the SNA. In the immediate aftermath the Somali army front line in Galmudug state became highly disorganized and chaotic, resulting in the SNA abandoning several previously hard-fought towns. The shock was so significant it required the top ranks of the government to leave the capital and oversee the front. The commander of the 62nd Division of the SNA stated that the army had retreated in order to avoid further losses. On 2 September 2023, Somali President Hassan Mahmoud admitted that the battle had been a defeat for the army.

The battle exposed serious deficiencies in planning, intelligence, and command coordination within the Somali National Army, prompting widespread criticism of the Federal Government's handling of the offensive. Over a week after the attack, several military officers responsible for withdrawing SNA forces were arrested by the government. Former Somali President Sharif Sheikh Ahmed demanded an investigation following the SNA withdrawals, stating that: “Parliament should carry out a serious investigation into the battle, in which we lost many soldiers, and hold the commanders responsible.”
