= 2024 Mogadishu SYL Hotel attack and siege =

Terrorist incident in Somalia

- Part of the Somali Civil War
- Location: SYL Hotel, Mogadishu, Somalia
- Date: 14 March 2024
- Target: Government officials
- Attack type: Bombing, siege, shootout
- Deaths: 14 (including 6 perpetrators)
- Injuries: 27
- Perpetrator: Al-Shabaab

On 14 March 2024, a suicide bomber affiliated with al-Shabaab detonated a device outside the SYL hotel in Mogadishu, Somalia. Three guards and two security forces were reported killed. Five gunmen then stormed the hotel in a 13-hour siege, causing a gunfight with the army which resulted in the deaths of three soldiers and the six attackers. Twenty-seven other people were wounded. The hotel is located close to the Presidential Palace. The location makes it popular with government officials.
