= Beled Hawo =

Town in Gedo, Somalia

Beled Hawo Buulo Xaawo
- Location in Somalia
- Coordinates: 3°55′43″N 41°52′34″E
- Country: Somalia
- State: Jubaland
- Region: Gedo
- District: Beled Hawo District

Area
  - Total: 31 sq mi (80 km^{2})
- Time zone: UTC+3 (EAT)
- Postal code: 252

Beled Hawo (Somali: Beledxaawo or Buuloxaawo) is a business town in Gedo, Somalia. Beledxaawo is a border town and business gateway to Kenya and Ethiopia. The town is also the business headquarters of Gedo Region.

Physical cash was reportedly "virtually obsolete" in the town by July 2025, creating a reliance on mobile money services.
