= Bakaara Market =

Open market in Mogadishu, Somalia

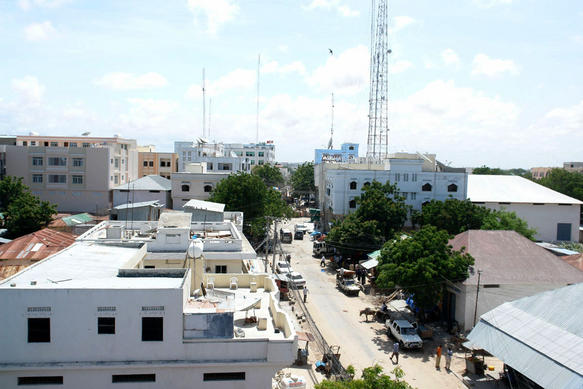
The Bakaara Market in 2005

The Bakaaraha Market (Somali: Suuqa Bakaaraha) is an open market in Mogadishu, Somalia. It is the largest in the nation. The name Bakaaraha is derived from the Somali word for grain silo or storage, baqaar.

The market was created in late 1972 during the reign of Mohamed Siad Barre. Proprietors sell daily essentials, including maize, sorghum, beans, peanuts, sesame, wheat and rice, petrol and medicine.

== History ==
=== Battle of Mogadishu ===
On 3 October 1993, the market was one of the areas where the Battle of Mogadishu was fought. Two of the five U.S. Army Black Hawk helicopters, involved in the battle, were downed in the vicinity of the market area which led to a fierce firefight that lasted until the evening of 4 October 1993.

=== Violence, fires, and counterfeit currency ===
In 1997, a dispute arose over the control of the collection of taxes in the market. As a result of the confrontation, a rocket-propelled grenade was fired into a fuel tank. (Fuel tanks are above ground in the market, not stored underground.) Several civilians were injured.

In March of 1999, hundreds fled the market after fighting erupted. Fighting continued between Islamic Courts and secular militias through April.

On 26 January 2000, the market was the site of the shooting of Ahmed Kafi Awale, a radio commentator for Hussein Mohamed Aidid's Radio of the Somali People. Three others were killed and seven were injured.

On 10 April 2004, another fire broke out in the market. According to a report to the UN Security Council:

On the night of 10 April [2004], a serious fire in the main Bakaara market in Mogadishu resulted in at least eight people killed and more than 30 wounded. Armed looters shot indiscriminately into the crowd. The incident caused significant insecurity in the areas surrounding the market.

On 2 October 2007, another fire started in the market, spreading rapidly. The fire reportedly was caused by a fired shell during a brief fight between the re-liberation forces against Ethiopian forces and their allied transitional government forces nearby.

On 1 May 2010, two bombs detonated at a mosque near the market, killing 39 people and wounding 70.

In November 2012, the head of Bakara’s business community, businessman Ahmed Nure Awdiini, was shot dead outside his office in Mogadishu.

On 6 February 2024, at least ten people were killed and at least twenty others were injured in a quadruple bombing at the market.

== Security checkpoint ==
The security checkpoint for the market was controlled for a time by Mohamed Qanyare Afrah, a Mogadishu faction leader who was appointed Minister of National Security by the Transitional Federal Government. The checkpoints for the market were removed in June 2005 as part of the Green Leaf for Democracy (GLED) initiative of a "Global Week against Small Arms."
