= March 2021 Mogadishu bombing =

Suicide attack on restaurant in Somalia

- Part of the Somali Civil War
- Location: Mogadishu, Somalia
- Date: 5 March 2021
- Target: Restaurant
- Attack type: Suicide car bombing
- Deaths: 21 (including the perpetrator)
- Injuries: 30
- Perpetrator: Al-Shabaab
- Motive: Islamic extremism

On 5 March 2021, a suicide car bombing occurred outside Luul Yemeni restaurant in Mogadishu, Somalia. The attack killed at least 20 people and injured another 30. Later the same day, jihadist group al-Shabaab claimed responsibility for the attack.
