= June 2021 Mogadishu bombing =

Terrorist incident in Somalia

- Location: Mogadishu, Somalia
- Date: 15 June 2021
- Target: Somali Armed Forces
- Attack type: suicide bombing
- Deaths: 15
- Injuries: unknown

On 15 June 2021, a suicide bombing occurred in Mogadishu, Somalia. It happened at the General Dhegobadan Military Camp, where the bomber killed 15 army recruits. He was in a queue of recruits, pretending to be one of them.

Al-Shabaab, the Somali/East African branch of al-Qaeda, claimed responsibility for the bombing. It was the deadliest attack in the Somali capital since December 2019, when an al-Shabaab truck bombing at a police checkpoint killed 85 people and wounded 140 others.
