= November 2021 Mogadishu bombing =

Bombing in Mogadishu

- Location: Mogadishu, Somalia
- Date: 25 November 2021
- Target: civilians
- Attack type: suicide vehicle bombing
- Deaths: 8
- Injuries: 17

At 7:30 am on 25 November 2021, in Mogadishu, Somalia, a suicide bomber in a sport utility vehicle killed eight people and wounded 17 others, including teachers and pupils at Mocaasir Primary and Secondary School, which was heavily damaged. Al-Shabaab military operations spokesman Abdiasis Abu Musab claimed his jihadist group was responsible, and had targeted an African Union Mission to Somalia convoy.
