= Battle of Ras Kamboni (2007) =

Battle of Ras Kamboni from (5 January 2007 - 7 January 2007)

- Part of the Somalia War (2006–2009); Operation Enduring Freedom - Horn of Africa
- Battle of Ras Kamboni, US & Ethiopian Airstrikes
Date	January 5–12, 2007
Location	Near Ras Kamboni, Somalia 1°38′20″S 41°35′17″E
Result	ENDF/TFG and US forces victory: ICU retreats from last major city; Start of Islamist insurgency in southern Somalia

Belligerents
(Ethiopia) Ethiopia (Somalia) TFG; United States	Islamic Courts Union; Ras Kamboni Brigades

Commanders and leaders
(Ethiopia) Gabre Heard (Somalia) Barre Adan Shire Hiiraale (Somalia) Abdirisak Afgadud (United States) Timothy Ghormley Maritime Security: (United States) Patrick M. Walsh	Sharif Sheik Ahmed; Yusuf Hassan; Yusuf Mohammed Siad Inda'ade Abdirahman Janaqow

Strength
Unknown	500–1,000

Casualties and losses
- Around 60 dead, 100 wounded in airstrikes

The Battle of Ras Kamboni took place during the Ethiopian invasion of Somalia at the start of 2007. It began Ethiopian National Defense Force and Transitional Federal Government (TFG) militia backed by United States military air power launched an offensive on Ras Kamboni, a town near the Kenyan border which was the last major urban stronghold of the Islamic Courts Union (ICU) as it with withdrew deep into the south.

After withdrawing from Kismayo, much of the ICU's armed forces scattered into the scrublands of southern Somalia or withdrew to make a last stand at Ras Kamboni. The ICU forces at Ras Kamboni dug large defensive trenches around the town. The battle began on January 6, 2007, when Ethiopian and TFG forces launched their assault. On January 7, 2007, the United States publicly entered the conflict by launching airstrikes using AC-130 gunships and cruise missiles against what it claimed were Al Qaeda members operating within the ranks of the ICU. The town finally fell to the Ethiopian and TFG forces on January 12, 2007. Initially, the US claimed that it had successfully targeted Al-Qaeda, but after the attacks downgraded those killed to being 'associates with terrorists'. American forces reportedly killed hundreds of Somali fighters and civilians in a 'killing zone' between the Kenyan border, the Indian Ocean and advancing US backed Ethiopian troops.

International concern and controversy arose over civilian casualties in additional airstrikes around Ras Kamboni and in Afmadow province, and whether these were the result of U.S. actions or Ethiopian aircraft operating in the area.

== Background ==
U.S. security concerns in the Horn of Africa, particularly at Ras Kamboni, heightened after the September 11, 2001 attacks on the United States. On December 16, 2001, Paul Wolfowitz said the U.S. was meeting with various Somali and Ethiopian contacts to "observe, survey possible escape routes, possible sanctuaries" for Al Qaeda operatives. On March 2, 2002 a briefing was held in the Pentagon discussing the possible use of Ras Kamboni by terrorist groups, including al-Ittihaad al-Islamiya (AIAI) and Al Qaeda. In December 2002, the U.S. established the Combined Joint Task Force - Horn of Africa (CJTF-HOA) to monitor developments in the region and to train local militaries in counterterrorism. When Ethiopian troops invaded Somalia in December 2006, a small number of U.S. special forces accompanied them to give military advice and to track suspected al-Qaida fighters.

On December 28, 2006, withdrawal of the ICU to Ras Kamboni was reported as a possibility after the Fall of Mogadishu to Somali TFG and Ethiopian forces.

After their loss at the Battle of Jilib and the Fall of Kismayo on January 1, 2007, ICU fighters split into different groups, with some heading northwest towards Dhobley (0°24′35″N 41°0′21″E) and Afmadow, others moving to the remote, hilly areas of Buur Gaabo, and the remainder withdrawing southwest towards the peninsula town of Ras Kamboni (1°38′20″S 41°35′17″E).

On January 2, 2007, Ethiopian MiG jets began to patrol over Ras Kamboni but no attacks were reported. U.S. Marines operating from Lamu, Kenya, were said to be assisting Kenyan forces patrolling the border with Somalia to intercept Islamists.

Unknown gunmen thought to be Somali Islamists fired shots at a Kenyan security helicopter patrolling near the border with Somalia. The helicopter was flying over the southeastern Kenyan border town of Hulugho. The report did not indicate whether the aircraft sustained damage but noted that gunmen discharged small arms from the vicinity of Ras Kamboni, the operational base of the retreating Islamist forces.

The United States Fifth Fleet's Carrier Strike Group 8, along with the British-led multinational maritime task force, Combined Task Force 150 (CTF-150), based out of Bahrain are patrolling off the Somali coast to prevent terrorists from launching an "attack or to transport personnel, weapons or other material", said Commander Kevin Aandahl. The U.S. ships deployed to the area include the USS Ramage guided missile destroyer, the USS Bunker Hill and USS Anzio guided missile cruisers, the USS Ashland amphibious landing ship and the USS Dwight D. Eisenhower aircraft carrier.

== Battle ==
=== January 5 ===
On January 5, 2007, TFG Defense Minister Colonel Barre Aden Shirre Hiiraale announced: "Today we will launch a massive assault on the Islamic courts militias. We will use infantry troops and fighter jets... They have dug huge trenches around Ras Kamboni but have only two options: to drown in the sea or to fight and die."

=== January 6 ===
Fighting continued January 6 in the forests south of Kismayo near the Kenyan border, where it was reported the Islamists were holding out armed with over 100 technicals.

=== January 8 ===
On January 8, 2007, Col. Hiraale announced TFG and Ethiopian forces were close to entering Ras Kamboni after two days of fierce battles.

Premature reports came of the fall of Ras Kamboni. One was from TFG member Abdirashid Hidig. A second came from a TFG military divisional commander, Abdirisak Afgadud (alternately spelled Abdulrasaq Afgebub): "Our forces accompanied by our Ethiopian friends have totally cracked down on the remnants of the Islamists in the border area." Defense Minister Hiraale corrected and clarified the reports, saying fighting was ongoing. 50 wounded Ethiopian troops were reported evacuated by helicopter.

To the north of Ras Kamboni, elsewhere in Badhadhe province, an Ethiopian force intercepted Islamist forces in the area of the Kenyan border town of Amuma, Garissa district. Seven vehicles were destroyed. A platoon of Kenyan border police were in the area to enforce the border closure. In Afmadow province, Ethiopia launched airstrikes against targets near Afmadow and Dhobley.

Also on January 8, it was reported that an AC-130 gunship belonging to the United States military had attacked a suspected Al-Qaeda operative, along with other Islamist fighters, on Badmadow Island (possibly the island located at 1°36′42″S 41°36′42″E) near Ras Kamboni in southern Somalia the day before (January 7). The aircraft flew out of its base in Djibouti. The U.S. reported 8 - 10 deaths, mostly Somalis, but the identity of the dead or wounded was not yet established. Reports said DNA testing was being done to establish identities but U.S. sources denied that the top al-Qaida targets were among those killed. "The U.S. were trying to kill the al-Qaeda terrorists who carried out the bomb attacks on their embassies in Kenya and Tanzania", Deputy Prime Minister Hussein Aideed told The Associated Press. "They have our full support for the attacks." Cruise missiles were fired at ICU positions.

The targeted leaders were tracked by the use of unmanned aerial vehicles (UAVs) as they headed south from Mogadishu starting on December 28. It was also reported the aircraft carrier USS Dwight D. Eisenhower had been moved into striking distance.

=== January 9 ===
On January 9, a second AC-130 strike was reported at Hayo (also Xayo or Hayi, approx. Lat 0º28' N, Long 41º49' E) on the road between the provincial capital of Afmadow and Dhobley (Doble) near the Kenyan border. Later more reports stated that more than 50, mostly Islamist leaders, have died in U.S. air strikes. A strike by two unidentified attack helicopters was also reported hitting near Afmadow (0°30′56″N 42°4′24″E). Somali Defense Ministry personnel stated this was a third U.S. attack, but eyewitness accounts could not establish the nationality of the helicopters. Unconfirmed reports claimed the attacks killed 31 civilians. It was later asserted by a U.S. military official the helicopters may have been Ethiopian Mi-24 Hinds. This would not have been the first case of off-target airstrikes for the Ethiopian attack helicopters. On January 3, they had attacked Harehare village, across the Kenyan border, mistaking it for Islamist positions at the town of Dhobley.

=== January 10 ===
On January 10, Defense Department spokesman Bryan Whitman identified Somalia as part of the war on terror: "As we pursue the war on terror we will seek out, attempt to identify, locate, capture and if necessary kill terrorists and to thwart their activities." A second planned attack was reportedly called off after losing track of the target.

Also on this day, a pair of reports arose which were covered widely in the media, but later contradicted by U.S. sources.

The first was a report by Somali presidential chief of staff, Abdirizak Hassan, who stated the U.S. airstrikes had killed Al Qaeda member Fazul Abdullah Mohammed, and leaders of the Islamic Courts Union including Abduallahi Moalim Ali (former chief of security for Mogadishu), Abdirahman Janaqow, and a third unidentified person. The bodies had reportedly been recovered by Ethiopian military personnel. This report was refuted the next day by a confidential U.S. source, who said the hunt for the three Al Qaeda members continues, though it was not mentioned whether the other ICU leaders mentioned were alive or dead.

The second report mentioned at least four more AC-130 airstrikes targeted Ras Kamboni. Other sites were also said to have been targeted by U.S. aircraft around southern Somalia. Somali politician Abdirashid Mohamed Hidig toured the area by helicopter and spoke of 50 killed in the attacks. He said additional targets hit include Hayo, Garer, Bankajirow and Badmadowe. Clan elder Haji Farah Qorshel claimed 64 people were killed and 100 wounded around Afmadow in three days of attacks. However, confidential sources denied the additional attacks were made by the U.S. Ethiopian aircraft are also known to be operating in the combat area.

=== January 11 ===
On January 11, the American ambassador to Kenya said that the U.S. claimed Al-Qaeda suspect Fazul Abdullah Mohammed was actually still alive and that none of the Al-Qaeda members were killed in the air attack but some members of the ICU were killed. Later in the day, anonymous U.S. sources stated that U.S. forces from the CIA's elite Special Activities Division were on the ground in Somalia targeting and then identifying the persons who had been killed in the gunship attack.

=== January 12 ===
On January 12, TFG Defense Minister Barre Aden Shirre Hiiraale announced Ras Kamboni had fallen to the Somali government and Ethiopian forces after five days of heavy fighting. Remnants of the Islamist forces were being pursued into the nearby forests and fighting would continue. A small team of U.S. forces investigated the site of the U.S. gunship attack to search for information about the identity and fate of the targeted individuals.

=== January 17 ===
Theresa Whelan, U.S. deputy assistant secretary of defense for African affairs, in a press conference said she believed the raid killed eight soldiers of Aden Hashi Farah Ayro, head of an Islamist militia. Ayro was believed to have been wounded in the attack and perhaps killed.

== See also ==
- Combined Joint Task Force - Horn of Africa
- Special Activities Division
