= War in Somalia (2006–2009) =

Ethiopian military invasion and occupation in Somalia

Ethiopian invasion of Somalia
- Part of the Ethiopian–Somali conflict, Operation Enduring Freedom – Horn of Africa and the Somali Civil War
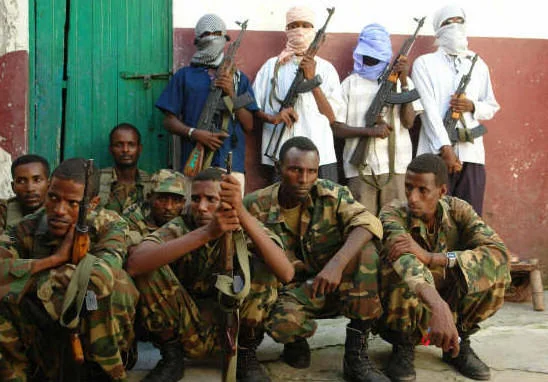
- Top to bottom: Ethiopian T-55 tank advances on Mogadishu (Dec 2006); ICU insurgents pose with their rifles over TFG and ENDF soldiers (Sep 2008)
Date	17 June 2006 – 31 January 2009 (2 years, 7 months, 1 week and 1 day)
Location	Southern and Central Somalia
Result	Somali insurgent victory, see Consequences: Start of US intervention in Somalia; Disintegration of the Islamic Courts Union government and emergence of Islamist insurgency; Deployment of AMISOM troops (2007); Rise of al-Shabaab; Escalation of Insurgency in Ogaden; Proliferation of Somali piracy; Insurgency recaptures majority of Southern/Central Somalia and Mogadishu; Second largest wave of internal displacement and refugees since 1991; Withdrawal of ENDF from Mogadishu and majority of Somalia (2009); New phase of Somali Civil War with conflict between 'radical' and 'moderate' Islamists

Belligerents
Invasion: Ethiopia; (Somalia) TFG; United States Supported by: Kenya; Insurgency: Ethiopia; (Somalia) TFG; Puntland; Galmudug; ASWJ United States; AMISOM: Burundi; Kenya; Malawi; Nigeria; Uganda	Invasion: Islamic Courts Union; Supported by: ONLF; Eritrea Insurgency: Al-Shabaab; (Somalia) ARS; Ras Kamboni Brigades; Jabhatul Islamiya; Muaskar Anole; ICU loyalists

Commanders and leaders
(Ethiopia) Meles Zenawi; (Ethiopia) Gabre Heard; (Ethiopia) Kuma Demeksa; (Ethiopia) Samora Yunis; (Somalia) Abdullahi Yusuf; (Somalia) Ali Gedi; (Somalia) Barre Hiiraale; (Puntland) Adde Musa; (United States) George W. Bush; (United States) Barack Obama; (United States) Robert Gates	Sharif Ahmed; Hassan Aweys; Ibrahim Addow; Abdullahi Afrah †; Abdirahman Janaqow; Abdilqadir Ali Omar; Madobe (POW); Hassan al-Turki; Aden Ayrow †; Ahmed Godane; Mukhtar Robow

Strength
Ethiopia: 50,000–60,000; TFG: 10,000 soldiers; AMISOM: 5,250 soldiers; US Forces: Unknown	ICU: 4,000 (2006); Al-Shabaab: 2,000 (2008) 3,000 (2009); Foreign fighters: Several hundred

Casualties and losses
Ethiopia: At least 3,773 killed (per IGAD), see Casualties TFG: Unknown; 15,000 deserted; AMISOM: Unknown, see Casualties	2,000–3,000 killed; 4,000–5,000 wounded (Ethiopian claim, Dec. 2006)
- Civilian casualties: 16,210–20,000 killed; Over 1 million displaced (Nov. 2007); (see § Casualties and human rights violations)

The Ethiopian invasion of Somalia, also known as the Ethiopian occupation of Somalia was an armed conflict lasting from mid-2006 to early 2009. It began when Ethiopian military forces, supported by the United States, invaded Somalia to depose the Islamic Courts Union (ICU) and install the Transitional Federal Government (TFG). The conflict evolved into a military occupation and a rapidly escalating anti-Ethiopian insurgency. By 2008, insurgents had recaptured the majority of territory lost by the ICU during the invasion. The conflict caused the second largest population displacement since 1991.

Ethiopian military involvement began in mid-2006 in response to the rise of the ICU, which operated as the de facto government in southern and central Somalia. To reinforce the weak, Ethiopian-backed TFG, troops from the Ethiopian National Defence Force (ENDF) began deploying into Somalia in June. Six months later, backed by a covert US military contingent, the ENDF launched a full-scale invasion aimed at regime change. The conventional war lasted just over a week. Overwhelmed, the ICU began disintegrating during the fighting, precipitating a withdrawal from battlefield positions and the Fall of Mogadishu in the final days of 2006.

In early 2007, an insurgency emerged centered on a loose coalition of ICU loyalists, volunteers, clan militias, and various Islamist factions, among which al-Shabaab eventually assumed a pivotal role. In the same period, the African Union (AU) established the AMISOM peacekeeping operation, sending thousands of troops to Somalia to bolster the besieged TFG and ENDF. The Alliance for the Re-liberation of Somalia (ARS), a political successor to the ICU, further incited the insurgents. Over the following two years, the ENDF, TFG, and AMISOM became entrenched in a protracted struggle against an escalating insurgency, leading to the displacement of nearly one million inhabitants from Mogadishu.

By the end of 2007, ENDF troops were bogged down in a multi-front war with no prospect of victory. While Mogadishu witnessed fierce fighting, insurgents launched offensives across southern and central Somalia in late 2007 and 2008, regaining territory previously lost by the ICU. In 2008, al-Shabaab began taking control of significant tracts of southern Somalia, governing territory for the first time. The Ethiopian military occupation faltered, and by autumn 2008, more than 80% of the territory the ICU lost during the invasion had been recaptured by the insurgency.

The TFG remained weak and divided. Piracy off the coast of Somalia, previously suppressed by the ICU, proliferated greatly. By December 2008, the overwhelming majority of TFG security forces had deserted, and the TFG was only able to control parts of Mogadishu and the city of Baidoa. TFG President Abdullahi Yusuf resigned soon after, stating that he had lost control. The insurgency had effectively won.

At the end of 2008, the ARS was assimilated into the TFG in an attempt to halt the growing insurgency and form a representative government. During January 2009, former head of the ICU Sharif Ahmed was elected president. Declaring victory and claiming to have eradicated the 'Islamist threat', the ENDF withdrew from Mogadishu, ending the two-year occupation. Most territory lost by the ICU had been recovered by insurgents, including much of Mogadishu. Years into the present phase of the civil war, Ethiopia became re-involved and joined AMISOM in 2014 to counter the growth of al-Shabaab.

== Background ==
=== Historic background ===
Disputes between Somalia and Ethiopia over the Ogaden (now the Somali Region) date to Ethiopian Emperor Menelik's expansions into Somali lands during the 1890s, initiating the process of incorporation into the Ethiopian Empire. Several decades of growing tension and conflict culminated in the 1977–1978 War where Somalia launched an invasion to assist the Western Somali Liberation Front in the hope of incorporating the Ogaden into a unitary 'Greater Somalia'. Major conflicts between Ethiopia and Somalia since the latter's independence in 1960 include:

- 1964 Border War
- 1977–1978 Ogaden War
- 1982 Border War
- 1996–2003 border incursions during the Somali Civil War. Ethiopian troops had been crossing into Somalia since 1996 to support militias in regions such as Bay, Puntland and Gedo.

In 2000, the first successful attempt to form a government since the collapse of Somalia's central authority in 1991 led to the creation of the Transitional National Government (TNG). Ethiopia opposed the TNG, fearing that Somali reunification would reignite claims on the Ogaden region. In response, Ethiopia supported groups in Somalia that resisted the TNG and actively sponsored the formation of opposition alliances to preserve its strategic interests. After the 9/11 attacks, the Ethiopian government labelled TNG leaders as Islamic extremists who were pro-Bin Laden. Ethiopia sent its troops into Somalia numerous times during the early 2000s but repeatedly denied doing so, which the BBC speculated was to avoid international vilification. Al-Jazeera later described Ethiopia as, "...one of the biggest beneficiaries of the demise of the Somali state and its fragmentation."

The TNG later failed and was instead replaced by the rise of Islamic Courts Union (ICU) in the years following, which occurred concurrently with the escalating insurgency in the Ogaden waged by the Ogaden National Liberation Front (ONLF). The emergence of a strong Somali state not dependent on Addis Ababa was perceived as a security threat, and Ethiopian officials regarded the ICU as "totally uncontrollable". Consequently the Ethiopians heavily backed the formation of the Transitional Federal Government (TFG) in 2004 and the presidency of Abdullahi Yusuf on the grounds that he would give up Somalia's long standing claim to the Ogaden. Yusuf was previously a member of an Ethiopian-backed coalition of warlords that had undermined the TNG, and decades prior to that had led Somali rebels who assisted invading Ethiopian troops during the 1982 Ethiopian–Somali war.

Since the initial conquest of the Ogaden, and well into the 2000s, the presence of Addis Ababa in the Somali inhabited lands had been almost purely military in nature. The Ethiopian government was also determined never to permit a reprise of the 1970s Ogaden War. The Ogaden lay at the heart of the dispute between the ICU and the Ethiopian governments. Following their ascent to power, senior ICU officials accused Ethiopia of mistreating the Somalis under its rule and declared that the Ogaden would not be forgotten by them. The ONLF maintained a covert relationship with the ICU and regarded the courts as a natural ally. The Islamic Courts in Somalia represented the first instances of political Islam gaining prominence in Africa during the Post-9/11 era and consequently became a target of the Bush administration.

=== Information warfare, disinformation and propaganda ===
Even before the beginning of the war, there have been significant assertions and accusations of the use of disinformation and propaganda tactics by various parties to shape the causes and course of the conflict.

Eastern African countries and international observers had feared the Ethiopian offensive may lead to a regional war, involving Eritrea, which has a complex relationship with Ethiopia and who Ethiopia claimed to have been backing the ICU. The Eritrean government denied claims of sending troops to Somalia, and no evidence exists to support such reports. Despite providing backing for the ICU, no Eritrean presence was discovered in the country during the war except for journalists who were arrested and accused of being soldiers.

Ethiopia also denied deploying troops in Somalia for months despite being widely reported. The TFG also denied the presence of Ethiopian forces in Somalia, even after Ethiopia had admitted its troops were inside Somalia.

=== Prelude to war ===
The majority of Somali society, including much of the newly formed Transitional Federal Government, deeply opposed any foreign military intervention. With significant Ethiopian support, Abdullahi Yusuf was elected as the TFG president under a warlord-dominated government, and, under Ethiopian direction, he appointed a prime minister with connections to then-Ethiopian Prime Minister Meles Zenawi. These close connections to Addis Ababa were a driving force behind the invasion and provoked the ICU into later adopting a bellicose stance. During a 2004 visit to the Ethiopian capital Addis Ababa, when President Yusuf first requested 20,000 Ethiopian troops enter Somalia to back his government. A 2005 African Union fact finding mission to Somalia found that the overwhelming majority of Somalis rejected troops from neighboring states entering the country. Despite significant opposition within the TFG parliament, President Yusuf made the unpopular decision to invite Ethiopian troops to prop up his administration. As an institution, the TFG did not consent to or approve of the Ethiopian military intervention. No parliamentary approval was given for a decision openly opposed by a significant portion of the government. The leadership of Islamic Courts Union were infuriated by the TFG administration's push to deploy international troops, insisting that only a homegrown solution could address Somalia's problems.

During mid-2006, the ICU decisively defeated a CIA backed alliance of Somali warlords and became the first organization since the collapse of the state to control Mogadishu, which propelled the ICU on the national stage for the first time. The ICU began recruiting thousands of young men from across Somali territories and in the Somali diaspora. British television station Channel 4 acquired a leaked document detailing a confidential meeting between senior American and Ethiopian officials in Addis Ababa six months prior to the full-scale December 2006 invasion. Participants deliberated on various scenarios, with the 'worst-case scenario' being the potential takeover of Somalia by the Islamic Courts Union. The documents revealed that the US found the prospect unacceptable and would back Ethiopia in the event of an ICU takeover. Journalist Jon Snow reported that during the meeting 'the blueprint for a very American supported Ethiopian invasion of Somalia was hatched'. No Somali officials were involved in the discussions. Washington backed the invasion on the premise that a stable, ICU-governed Somalia was the threat rather than the solution, a Trojan horse for anti-American Islam, even as the ICU repeatedly offered to open its territories for the Americans to inspect for suspects they were hunting.

After taking over Mogadishu, the ICU leadership sent a cable to Washington stating that they were not a "Taliban-type" movement and had no interest in being enemies with the United States. According to Ted Dagne, an Africa specialist for the US Congressional Research Service, the Islamic Courts had committed no act or provocation to initiate the Ethiopian invasion. American historian William R. Polk observes that the invasion had been unprovoked.

==== June–August 2006 incursions ====
The Ethiopian invasion began with the dispatch of several thousand Ethiopian National Defence Force (ENDF) troops around Baidoa city located in Bay region, far inside Somalia, to build a bridgehead for a future large scale military operation. On 16 June 2006, Shabeelle Media Network reported that sources in Ethiopia's Somali Region had witnessed a massing of ENDF 'heavy armoured vehicles' along many of the towns on the Ethiopian–Somali border and on the following day the first Ethiopian troops moved into Somalia. Local Somali officials and residents in Gedo region reported about 50 ENDF armored vehicles had passed through the border town of Dolow and pushed 50 km inland near the town of Luuq. ICU head Sheik Sharif Ahmed claimed that 300 ENDF had entered the country through the border town of Dolow in Gedo region and that Ethiopian forces had also been probing Somali border towns. He went on to threaten to fight Ethiopian troops if they continued intervening and further stated, "We want the whole world to know what's going on. The United States is encouraging Ethiopia to take over the area. Ethiopia has crossed our borders and are heading for us."

The Ethiopian government denied the deployment of its forces in Somalia and countered that the ICU was marching towards its borders. The TFG also denied accusations of an Ethiopian presence and claimed that the ICU was fabricating a pretext to attack it. Additionally, the TFG arrested several reporters from Shabelle Media Network and imposed restrictions on their radio station after they reported on the ENDF incursion. On 19 June 2006 the ICU called for the international community to pressure Ethiopian forces to withdraw from Somalia. By July, approximately 20,000 ENDF had built up along the border. The Ethiopians demanded the Islamic Courts withdraw from the city of Beledweyne and threatened to attack if they did not comply. Soon after another major deployment of the ENDF into Somalia occurred on 20 July 2006. Local residents reported dozens of armored vehicles enter the country, though the Ethiopian government denied the presence of its troops. Reuters estimated that roughly 5,000 ENDF had built up inside Somalia by this point.

On 23 July 2006, the Ogaden National Liberation Front announced that they had shot down an Ethiopian military helicopter heading across the border and warned that movements in the Ogaden pointed towards an imminent large-scale operation directed at southern Somalia. That same day, another ENDF contingent crossed into Somalia, leading to the collapse of the Khartoum talks between the ICU and TFG. The ICU walked out after ENDF troops seized Wajid and landed helicopters. Abdirahman Janaqow, the deputy leader of the ICU executive council, announced soon after that, "The Somali government has violated the accord and allowed Ethiopian troops to enter Somali soil." TFG officials claimed that no Ethiopians were in Somalia and that only their troops were in Wajid. BBC News confirmed reports of Ethiopian troops in Wajid during interviews with local residents and aid workers. Following the towns seizure, the ICU pledged to wage a holy war to drive out the Ethiopian military from Somalia. Days later a group of TFG parliamentarians issued a statement demanding Ethiopia cease its "aggression against Somalia" and withdraw.

The escalation of Ethiopian troop deployments into Somalia during July 2006 began raising fears of a possible 'all-out war' in the Horn of Africa, though the 2006 Lebanon War overshadowed news reports of several thousand troops entering Somalia. Eritrea called for the withdrawal of the ENDF to prevent a regional war and the following month accused Ethiopia of plotting a US supported invasion with the aim of destroying the "realization of a unified Somalia" At the end of July over a dozen TFG parliamentarians resigned in protest of the Ethiopian invasion and by August 2006 the TFG was mired in a severe internal crisis and at risk of collapse.

==== September–November 2006 incursions and clashes ====
By September, at least 7,000 Ethiopian troops were in Somalia and had begun arming warlords defeated by the ICU. ENDF forces built up troops inside the Hiran and Gedo regions.

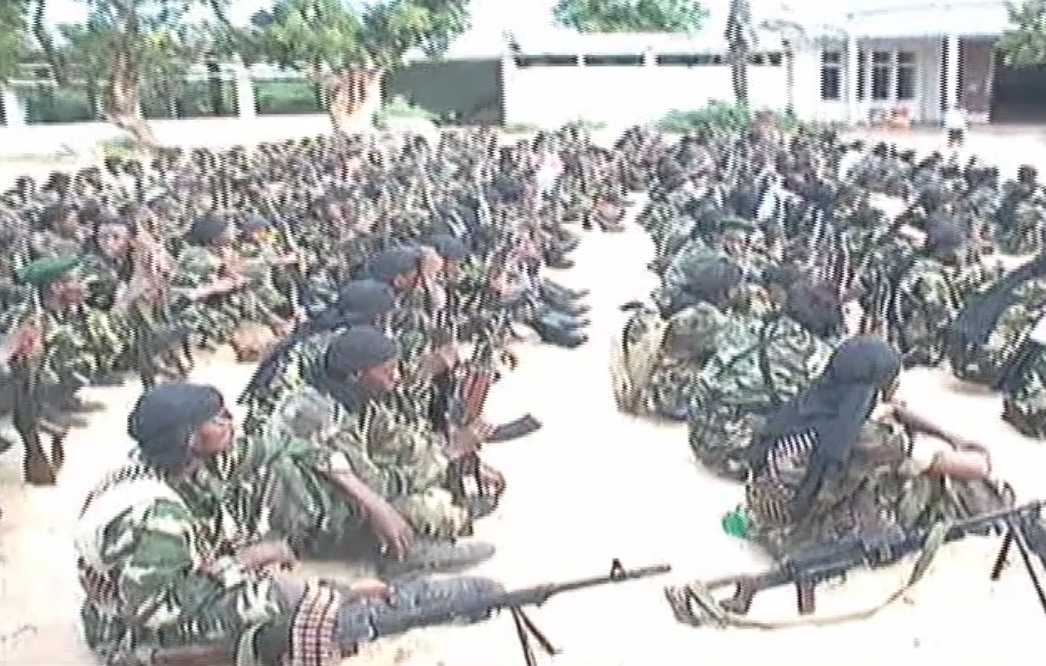
Islamic Courts Union soldiers preparing for the invasion at a training camp (2006)

The first clash between ICU and ENDF occurred on 9 October 2006. TFG forces, backed by the Ethiopian troops, attacked the ICU positions at the town of Burhakaba, forcing the courts to retreat. AFP reported that residents in Baidoa had witnessed a large column ENDF vehicles depart from city before the clash. Meles Zenawi's government denied that the ENDF was in Somalia, but local residents confirmed the presence of large numbers of Ethiopians in Burhakaba. The Economist reported the incident had set off a fierce reaction even among the most moderate among the ICU and that a recruitment mobilization was initiated. The ICU claimed that the ENDF had also sent another large deployment across the border into Somalia. Following the Burhakaba incident, Chairman Sharif Ahmed announced "This is clear aggression...Our forces will face them soon if they do not retreat from Somali territories" and declared Jihad against Ethiopian military forces. These declarations were echoed even by Sufi oriented members within the organization, and was explicitly framed as a defensive jihad against the threat of invasion.

In November 2006, the situation significantly escalated with the extensive mobilization and strategic positioning of ENDF, TFG and ICU forces in southern Somalia. Hostile public rhetoric from the Ethiopians and ICU also intensified. The distance between the opposing forces on the front line closed to less than 20 km apart. On 19 and 21 November the ICU ambushed two ENDF convoys near Baidoa. On 29 November the ICU claimed Ethiopian forces had shelled their positions at Bandiradley. The next day ICU forces ambushed another ENDF convoy outside of Baidoa.

That month, the Ogaden National Liberation Front (ONLF) declared that it would not allow the Ogaden region to be used as a launching pad to invade Somalia and warned that it would resist any attempts to do so. The Ethiopian military campaign against the ONLF, along with widespread atrocities committed against civilians associated with it, drove hundreds of men (thousands according to some estimates) from the Ogaden to Mogadishu to answer the ICU's call to arms against the invasion. Several hundred men from Somaliland also joined the Courts militia, including high-ranking military officers, while ICU supporters in Puntland primarily provided financial and logistical aid. ICU officials reported around 100 fighters from Puntland had defected to join their ranks during mid-November.

==== Early December 2006 ====
TFG speaker of parliament Sharif Hassan Adan announced on 3 December 2006 that Ethiopia had deployed a "massive military force" of 15,000 troops. Adan sought to reconcile with the ICU and stated that the blame for any war in Somalia lay on the Ethiopian government led by Meles Zenawi. Some senior Ethiopian military officers reportedly opposed the planned campaign against the ICU.

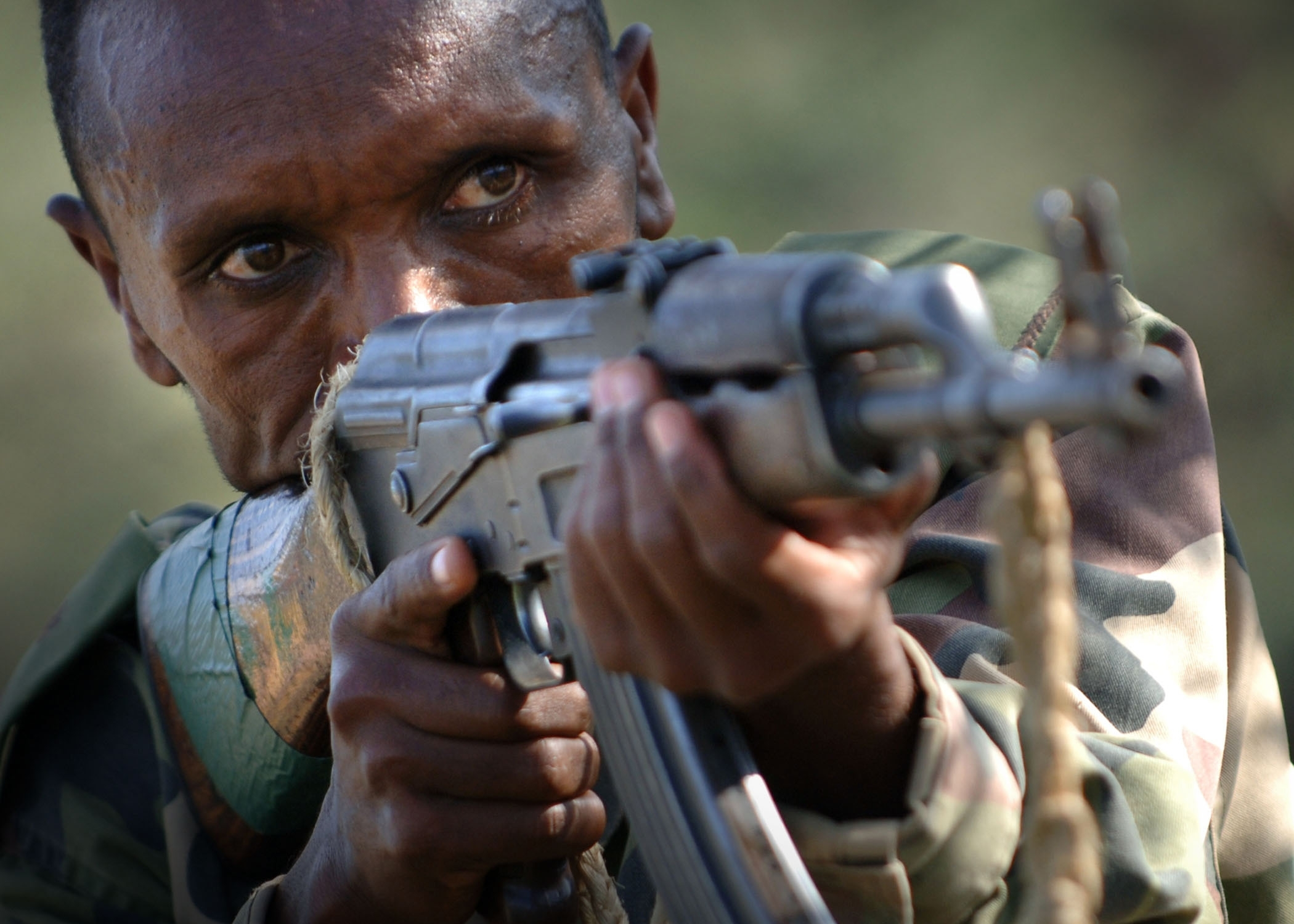
Ethiopian National Defense Force soldier training with the U.S. troops in Hurso, Somali Region of Ethiopia (Dec 2006)

The most significant event to immediately prelude the war was the passing of United Nations Security Council 1725 on 6 December 2006. The resolution called for the deployment of foreign troops and the lifting of the arms embargo. The Islamic Courts and Muslim Somali leaders had in the months prior to the resolution firmly rejected the deployment of any international military forces in Somalia as an act of war. Top leaders of the TFG had previously requested that 20,000 foreign troops, including Ethiopian forces be deployed to Somalia, though the move was opposed by many parliamentarians. Prior UN resolutions barred neighboring states from deploying forces, yet Ethiopia had already violated an earlier mandate by deploying thousands of troops in Somalia. To the Islamic Courts, the new resolution seemed to rubber-stamp Ethiopia's invasion– all the more so because the Security Council said nothing about Ethiopian troops already deployed on Somali soil.

Several weeks before the resolution was passed, a UN report had alleged that the ICU had fought in the Lebanon War and given Iran access the uranium deposits within Somalia. Observers drew parallels these allegations and the accusations made by the United States during the lead up to the 2003 invasion of Iraq. Herman Cohen, the US Assistant Secretary for African Affairs, noted the US decision to back resolution had been influenced by false Ethiopian intelligence. The ICU viewed the passing of UNSCR 1725 as effectively a declaration of war, a UN endorsement of the Ethiopian invasion and as evidence of an international conspiracy against the union.

In December, the United States Assistant Secretary of State issued a statement openly accusing the ICU leadership of being members of al-Qaeda. US military trainers in town of Hurso, Somali Region oversaw the training of ENDF forces as the build up for war took place in the area. Al-Shabaab, one of the militia within the military wing of the ICU, increasingly radicalized in response to the Ethiopian incursion. On 8 December 2006, two days after UNSCR 1725 was passed, the ICU reported being ambushed by Ethiopian troops, sparking an artillery duel which escalated into a two-day battle between ENDF/TFG and ICU forces.

== Forces involved ==
Forces involved are difficult to calculate because of many factors, including lack of formal organization or record-keeping, and claims marred by disinformation. For months leading up to the war, Ethiopia maintained it had only a few hundred advisors in the country, yet independent reports indicated far more troops.

Approximately 50,000 to 60,000 Ethiopian National Defence Force (ENDF) troops backed by artillery, tanks, helicopter gunships and combat jets had been involved in the offensive against the Islamic Courts Union during December 2006. The ENDF was the largest military force in sub-Saharan Africa with one of the continent's strongest air forces. This contrasted sharply with the Islamic Courts, which lacked comparable conventional forces. Gabre Heard, a senior ENDF officer and Tigray Peoples Liberation Front (TPLF) official, was commander-in-chief of ENDF forces during the invasion. The TFG claimed only 12,000 to 15,000 Ethiopian troops had been deployed to Somalia, while the Ethiopian government claimed it had only 4,000. During 2007, military experts estimated 50,000 Ethiopian troops were occupying parts of Somalia. Other estimates placed the figure at 40,000. The Ethiopian backed TFG possessed approximately 6,000 soldiers.

During the invasion phase of the war, US Special Forces, CIA paramilitary units, and Marine units, supported by American AC-130s and helicopter gunships, directly intervened in support of the ENDF. The US Bush administration doubted Ethiopia's ability to effectively use the new equipment it had provided for the invasion. As a result, it decided to involve US Special Forces and CIA agents in the campaign.

Reuters reported 3,000 to 4,000 troops fought under the ICU at its height. The insurgency that followed the collapse of the ICU was composed of numerous different groups and factions, making it difficult to determine who was responsibility for a variety of attacks and incidents, though al-Shabaab ultimately became the most powerful and active element. TFG PM Ali Gedi claimed that 8,000 foreigners were fighting for the ICU, although the African Union reported the country had only attracted 'several hundred' since the formation of the ICU to mid-2007. In 2008 there were reportedly around 100 foreign fighters in Somalia.

== 2006 ==
Prior to the invasion, significant military intelligence and logistics support was offered by the United States military to the ENDF. The Pentagon provided access to aerial reconnaissance and satellite surveillance of ICU military positions across Somalia. The Americans also played a substantial role in sponsoring the invasion, even covering expenses such as fuel and spare parts for Ethiopian troops. Pentagon officials and intelligence analysts reported that the invasion had been planned during the summer of 2006 and that US special forces were on the ground before the Ethiopians had intervened. Reuters reported American and British Special Forces, along with US-hired mercenaries, had been laying the ground work for the invasion within and outside Somalia since late 2005.

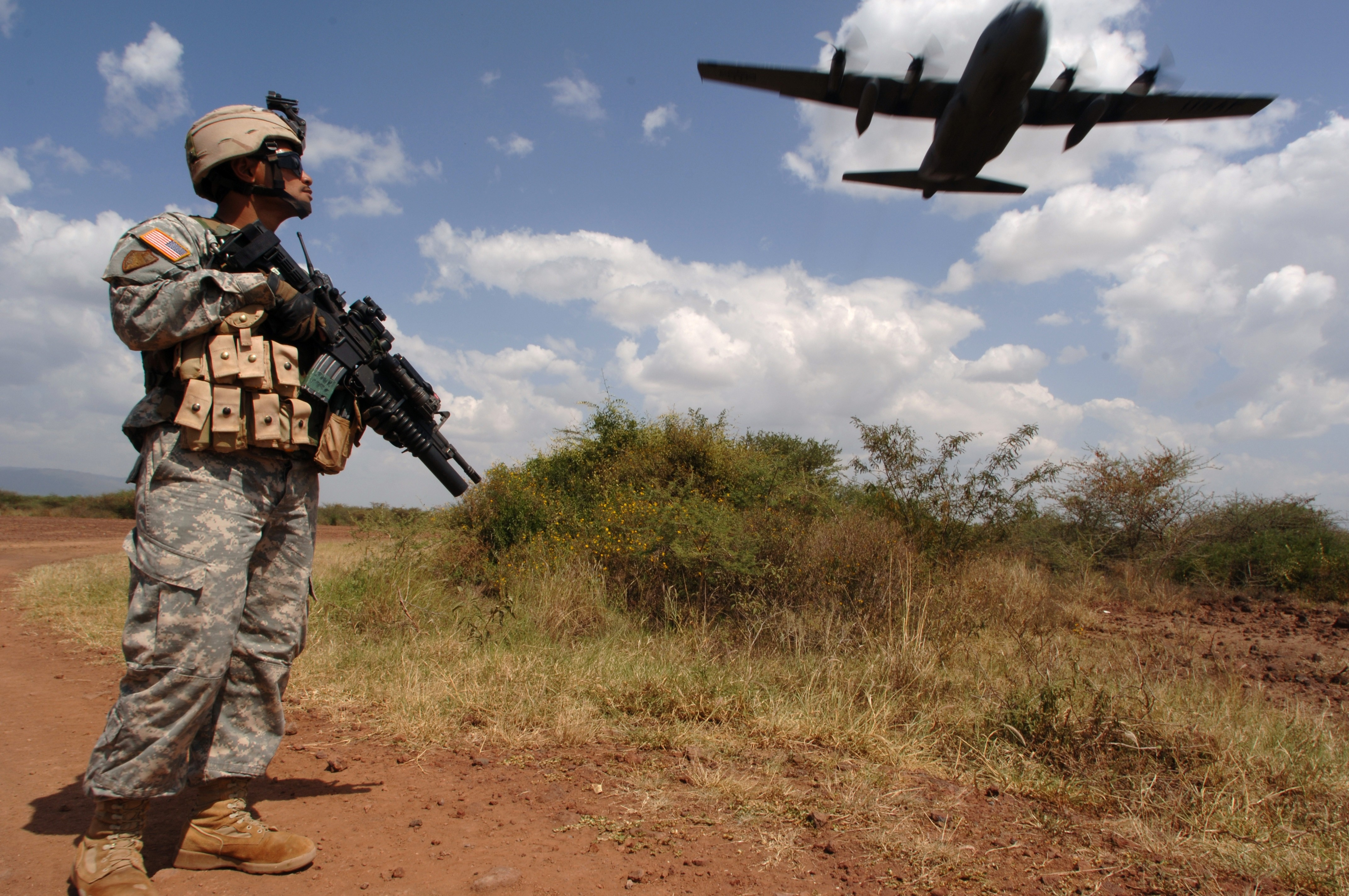
U.S. military forces transporting supplies with a C-130 at a remote airstrip in southern Ethiopia (Dec 2006)

Before the full-scale invasion began, more than 10,000 ENDF troops had been built up in and around Baidoa over the months since the first incursion in June 2006. Much of Bay and Bakool region had already been occupied by Ethiopian troops. Flooding that had taken place across Somalia since August 2006 delayed troop movements. By December, the land around strategic towns had largely dried. On 13 December, the ICU claimed 30,000 Ethiopian troops were deployed inside of Somalia. The following day, local residents and ICU officials in the Hiran region reported a large scale deployment of ENDF troops across the border over a 48-hour period in the regions environs.

As tensions escalated, different members within the ICU made unilateral statements regarding the response to the Ethiopian invasion without consulting the ICU leadership. On 13 December 2006, two high-ranking officials in the ICU's military wing, Yusuf Indhacade and his deputy Mukthar Robow, gave Ethiopian troops deployed in Somalia a seven-day ultimatum to withdraw from the country or face expulsion. The Courts were divided over whether or not to forcibly eject invading Ethiopian troops, and the European Union began last minute diplomatic efforts to halt the outbreak of war, resulting in contradictory statements from various ICU leaders. Sharif Sheikh Ahmed and Hassan Dahir Aweys, both adopted conciliatory stances as a result, but the sharp rise in tensions had empowered the Courts 'Hawks' who viewed the growing Ethiopian military forces and the passing of UNSCR 1725 as proof of an international conspiracy against the ICU. Statements from the international actors were contradictory as the African Union had at first endorsed the Ethiopian invasion, only to quickly retract the statement two days later. According to TFG officials negotiating with the ICU in December days prior to the outbreak of the war, up to 20,000 Ethiopian troops were stationed in Baidoa and its environs, while the ICU claimed the figure deployed in Somalia had risen to over 30,000.

=== 19–23 December ===
The first battle of the full-scale invasion began soon after the withdrawal ultimatum expired on 19 December 2006. Fighting broke out that evening when two reconnaissance teams clashed around the settlement of Idaale, 60 kilometres south of Baidoa. Both sides accused each other of initiating the fighting. ICU fighters, many of whom were university students, attacked Ethiopian positions in Daynunay, 20 kilometres east of Baidoa as heavy fighting and artillery shelling broke out on several different front lines. Some of the most intense fighting of the war took place between the ICU and ENDF/TFG around the towns of Daynuunay and Idaale. Heavy weaponry was used in a large scale face-to-face confrontation primarily between the Islamic Courts and Ethiopian forces. Though BBC journalists in the country at the time reported huge ENDF armor columns around Baidoa, the Ethiopian government denied its troops were in Somalia. Accounts from opposing camps noted heavy casualties from the fighting, with many bodies littering the battlefields, along with a massive influx of reinforcements.

From the start of the operation, American special forces were covertly present and the US Navy began to amass on the Somali coast. Between 19 and 21 December, the ICU and Ethiopian troops had faced off in open battle in three encounters. Despite the material and numerical odds against the Islamic Courts, they had prevailed in the three battles. These early victories led western intelligence officials and analysts to fear that the ICU would overrun Baidoa. US intelligence sources reported that in the initial days of the conflict, the ICU effectively used tactics against ENDF tanks that mirrored those employed by Hezbollah against the IDF months prior during the Lebanon War. ICU forces managed to advance only eight kilometres away from Baidoa, but lacking effective counters to Ethiopian artillery and armor superiority, the lightly armed fighters who charged the Ethiopian front line suffered high casualty rates. 50,000 Ethiopian troops took part in the invasion.

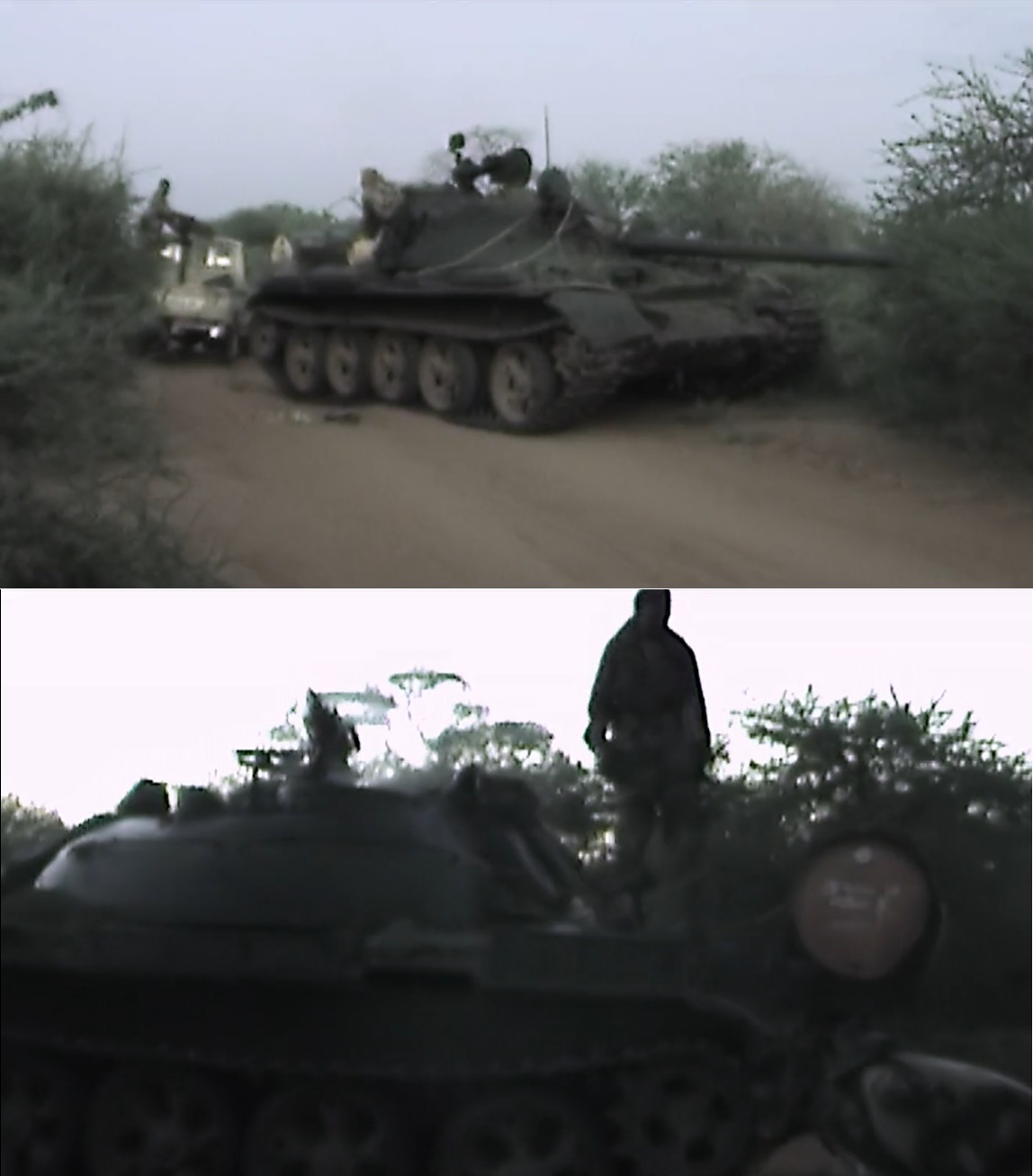
ENDF T-55 tank captured by ICU fighters at the Idaale front (Dec 2006)

American gunships, including helicopters and the AC-130, flew out of Dire Dawa and Diego Garcia to provide air support for Ethiopian troops. The USS Dwight D. Eisenhower carrier battlegroup was dispatched to the Somali coast to provide further air support and aerial surveillance. US Special forces and CIA paramilitary units also participated. The participation of the US ground and air forces provided the ENDF with massive military superiority over the ICU. Ali Gedi, then prime minister of the TFG and a participant in planning for the invasion noted that, "The Ethiopians were not able to come in without the support of the US Government...American air forces were supporting us." US operations during the invasion took place in a media vacuum, with no images or footage appearing of American forces. American planes and helicopters that struck ICU targets during December 2006 had their markings obscured. In an interview with al-Jazeera, head of the Islamic Courts Sharif Sheikh Ahmed later reported that after achieving a string of battlefield victories, ICU troops had come under unexpected bombardment from US aircraft.

As the ENDF advanced towards Mogadishu, they encountered fierce resistance in Bay region. Large battles took place around the settlements of Diinsoor and Daynuunay, where the Courts pushed back the Ethiopian army and overran a military camp. One of the most notable battles occurred at Idaale, where the ICU inflicted heavy losses on the invading forces. The ICU's al-Shabaab youth militia were also present for the battle. The ENDF were drawn out of their positions into battle when fighters attacked an Ethiopian position and then feinted a retreat. The Ethiopians pursued with a large contingent of troops and were soon ambushed by hundreds of fighters, initiating a massive battle between the ENDF and ICU that would last several days. After two days of large scale clashes, Sheik Hassan Dahir Aweys announced Somalia was in a state of war; but clarified that the ICU considered itself at war with Ethiopia and not the TFG. By the end of 22 December, both sides claimed to have killed hundreds of each other's troops. The Battle of Bandiradley began on 23 December 2006, when Ethiopian and Puntland forces, along with Abdi Qeybdid of the Somali warlord alliance, fought ICU militias defending Bandiradley. With the defensive capabilities of the Courts overextended and overwhelmed, the tide turned against them on the fourth day of the war as the Ethiopian army continued deploying their superior military hardware. The ICU positions at Bandiradley in central Somalia was the first to fracture, leaving a significant gap in the front line. No ICU reserves were available to deploy in the exposed northern flank, enabling the Ethiopian military to begin a blitzkrieg.

As ENDF convoys drove through the Ogaden region to reach the front line, the ONLF began attacking those attempting to join the war. The ONLF announced that on 23 December, in-line with their policy of resisting attacks on Somalia, they had attacked a convoy consisting of twenty armored vehicles and several trucks driving through Korahe Zone. The ONLF reported that after inflicting casualties and destroying four vehicles, the convoy had to retreat and abandon its planned operations in Somalia.

=== 24–27 December ===
On 24 December, the ICU reported to be around 10 km away from Baidoa. The Courts reported destroying several ENDF tanks during a battle at Daynuunay. The Ethiopian Air Force began carrying out airstrikes on the city of Beledweyne and other towns in central Somalia. After Beledweyne had become the target of airstrikes, the Courts decided to withdraw from the city. The Ethiopian Air Force bombed Mogadishu airport, killing several people in an airstrike. That same day Ethiopia admitted its troops were fighting the ICU for the first time, after stating earlier in the week it had only sent several hundred military advisors to Baidoa. Ethiopian PM Meles Zenawi claimed in a televised address that day that he had been compelled to go to war to protect national sovereignty. After Ethiopia admitted its troops were inside Somalia, the TFG continued to publicly deny the presence of ENDF troops, further undermining its credibility. Heavy fighting, including reports of airstrikes and shelling, erupted in the border areas, with the ICU claiming to have shot down an ENDF helicopter gunship.

Map of the initial Ethiopian advancements in December 2006

The ICU forces, composed primarily of lightly armed youth were heavily outnumbered, outgunned and exhausted. In the ensuing blitzkrieg, the many untrained ICU volunteers from various Somali clans were badly mauled. Fighting against forces with complete armor and air supremacy the Islamic Courts front line began to collapse in the face of conventional warfare. Ethiopian forces, rather than those of the TFG, were responsible for ICU battlefield losses, with the latter largely relying on the efforts of the ENDF. Defending Islamist forces withdrew from Beledweyne concurrent to Ethiopian airstrikes against the Mogadishu and Baledogle airports.

After fighting for nine days in open battle with the Ethiopian army, the courts began to pull back from the front line around Baidoa, Idaale, Dinsoor, Daynuunay and Burhakaba. Their forces withdrew and gathered around the town of Jowhar, 90 km north of Mogadishu. Analysts reported that the withdrawal had occurred simultaneously across the ICU's entire front, indicating a deliberate coordinated change in strategy rather than a chaotic rout. According to David Shinn, US ambassador to Ethiopia, the ICU had recognized their vulnerability to sustained attacks from an enemy with air and armor superiority and had opted for a transition to insurgent tactics. Following the withdrawal, Sharif Ahmed declared that the conflict had entered 'a new phase.'

On 27 December, the leaders of the Islamic Courts Union, including Sheikh Hassan Dahir Aweys, Sheikh Sharif Sheikh Ahmed and Sheikh Abdirahman Janaqow resigned, and the Courts government effectively dissolved, though Sharif declared that the Courts forces were still united. The ICU had evacuated many towns without fighting as ENDF/TFG forces advanced on Mogadishu That same day the African Union, supported by the Arab League and the IGAD, called for Ethiopia to withdraw from Somalia immediately.

=== 28–31 December ===
Route of ICU withdrawal from southern front and Mogadishu between 27 and 29 December

As Ethiopian troops advanced on Mogadishu, they were accompanied by the warlords who the ICU had defeated in mid-2006. The Ethiopians allowed the warlords to regain control over the fiefdoms they had previously lost to the courts. Demoralized, many fighters returned to their homes. The ICU declared it was withdrawing from the capital to prevent a bloodbath, and on 28 December, Ethiopian and government forces marched into the city of Mogadishu unopposed. After the Fall of Mogadishu to the Ethiopian and TFG forces on 28 December, the Islamists retreated deep into southern Somalia.

Protests erupted almost immediately as the presence of the Ethiopian army provoked the long standing animosity between Somalis and Ethiopians. The ICU announced that despite its desperate situation there would no surrender and further declared in a statement, "If the world thinks we are dead, they should know we are alive and will continue the jihad".

== 2007 ==
Military events in January 2007 focused on the southern section of Somalia, primarily the withdrawal of the ICU from Kismayo following the Battle of Jilib, and their pursuit using Ethiopian and American airstrikes until a final stand during the Battle of Ras Kamboni. US AC-130 gunships covertly flying out of Ethiopia pounded retreating ICU convoys, and Kenyan troops assisted in capturing retreating ICU forces. Local residents in southern Somalia reported Kenyan Defence Forces (KDF) convoys driving over the border, and residents in the Afmadow District of southern Somalia reported witnessing AC-130's pursuing and killing ICU troops.

American forces reportedly killed hundreds of Somali fighters and civilians in a 'killing zone' between the Kenyan border, the Indian Ocean and advancing US backed Ethiopian troops. US airstrikes focused on decapitating the ICU leadership, in one instance killing Sheikh Abdullahi Nahar, a popular leader of the movement. Cruise missiles were fired at ICU positions on 8 January 2007. American air power was used against villages in southern Somalia, resulting in significant civilian casualties and displacement. In one attack seventy-three nomadic herders and their livestock were killed in a US air strike. Somali elders and residents in the town of Dhobley estimated 100 civilians had been killed in US/ENDF airstrikes. In another, US aircraft bombed a wedding ceremony. After American involvement in the invasion became public knowledge, the Ethiopian government halted US AC-130 attacks from its military bases.

The United States admitted to conducting a strike against targets that they claimed were suspected al-Qaeda operatives. An admission to a second air attack was made later in January. Initially, the US claimed that it had successfully targeted al-Qaeda operatives responsible for the 1998 embassy bombings, but later retroactively downgraded those killed to being 'associates with terrorists'. Al-Shabaab militia suffered several losses in this period, resulting in a temporary loss of command and control over the organization. The Pentagon's announcement of air attacks in Somalia during the Ethiopian offensive confirmed the belief of many analysts that the US was involved in the invasion. United Nations Secretary-General Ban Ki-moon publicly expressed concern that the American attacks would escalate the conflict.

=== Occupation of Mogadishu (January 2007) ===
At the start of January, the Ethiopian government claimed it would withdraw "within a few weeks" The TFG announced that the rivaling Islamic forces had been defeated and that no further major fighting was expected to take place. After the Fall of Mogadishu, the security situation began to rapidly deteriorate and warlords who had been removed by the Islamic Courts began to reassert themselves. On 7 January, anti-Ethiopian protests broke out in Mogadishu, with hundreds of residents hurling stones and shouting threats towards ENDF troops. Ethiopian troops opened fire on the crowd after stones struck their patrol car, resulting in the death of two, including a 13-year boy. That same night a former ICU official was also assassinated in the city by gunmen. On 13 January, the TFG imposed martial law. The directives, which included a ban on public meetings, attempts to organize political campaigns and major media outlets, was enforced by Ethiopian troops. Warlord militia checkpoints began reappearing on Mogadishu roads and insecurity started once again returning to the city. On 9 January 2007, TFG president Abdullahi Yusuf landed at Mogadishu airport and was escorted by Ethiopian troops to the presidential palace, Villa Somalia.

The TFG proved to be incapable of controlling Mogadishu, or of surviving on its own without Ethiopian troops. Most of the population of the city opposed the TFG and perceived it to be a puppet government. The ENDF completely managed the salaries of TFG forces, who had to get personal approval from the Ethiopian army for their wages. The military occupation was marked by indiscriminate violence towards civilians by the Ethiopian army and TFG. Homes were raided in search of ICU loyalists, with lootings, beatings and executions of suspected collaborators commonplace. Several high-ranking figures of the TFG, including ex-speaker Sharif Hassan Sheikh Aden, were fired for calling for a compromise with the ICU. Members of the TFG present in Nairobi were threatened with expulsion by Kenyan foreign minister Raphael Tuju after they publicly called for the withdrawal of Ethiopian troops.

On 19 January, insurgents in Mogadishu launched an assault on the ENDF/TFG held Villa Somalia. The ICU claimed responsibility for the attack, declaring it as part of a "new uprising". The following day an ENDF convoy in the city came under ambush. Residents reported that the Ethiopian troops had responded by firing into crowds indiscriminately. The incidents began sparking concern of an upstart Islamist insurgency. Mogadishu was divided into two segments, one controlled by the ENDF/TFG and the other by emerging resistance movements. By the end of the month, a new ICU field commander was selected for the Banaadir region (Mogadishu and its environs) and many of the organization's fighters regrouped. At the same time guerrilla warfare was being waged in the southern regions of the country, with heavy losses being inflicted on ENDF/TFG forces.

=== Deployment of African Union forces ===
The African Union's involvement in the war came at the insistence of both Ethiopia and the United States for the organization to take over the role of 'regime changer'. In effect, the newly planned AU military operation in Somalia was an attempt to legitimize the Ethiopian invasion and TFG. According to Cocodia, "AMISOM was more a tool for regime change than it was a peace operation." Within the African Union there was significant skepticism about the legitimacy of the Ethiopian military occupation. On 20 February 2007, the United Nations granted authorization for the deployment of a peacekeeping mission by the African Union, known as the African Union Mission to Somalia (AMISOM). The mission's stated primary objective was to provide support for a national reconciliation congress in Somalia. AMISOM's deployment served as an exit strategy for Ethiopian troops, as their presence was inflaming an insurgency.

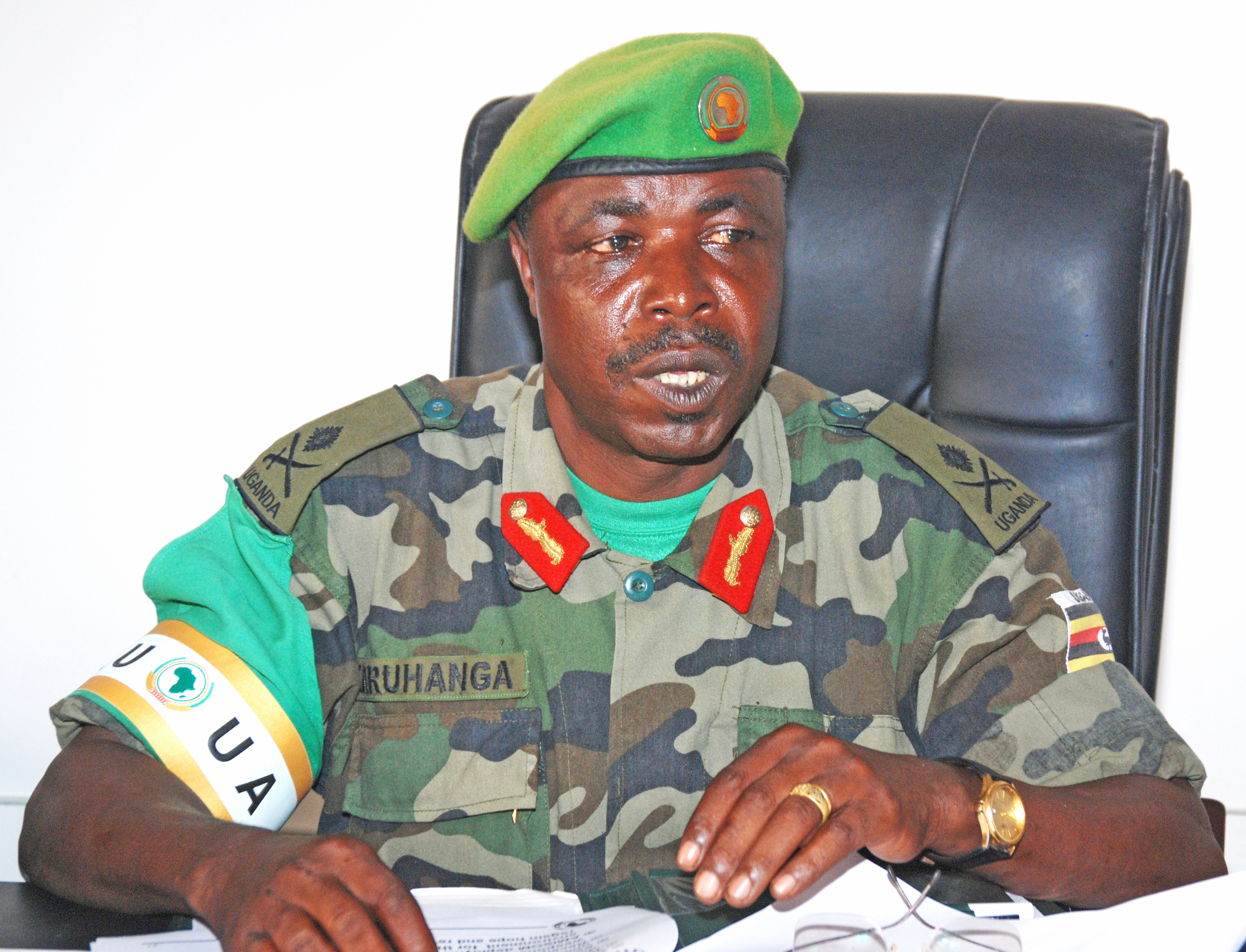
The commander of AMISOM troops in Somalia, UPDF Maj. Gen. Levi Karuhanga (2007 – 2008)

From 2007 to 2009, AMISOM was predominantly composed of troops from Uganda, Burundi, and a few Kenyans. During 2007, the operation relied heavily on Ugandan Peoples Defence Forces (UPDF), as Uganda played a crucial role in offering support to the initiation of the mission. In 2026 President of Uganda Yoweri Museveni, who had been ruling the country during the UPDF deployment to Somalia in early 2007, stated that Uganda's military deployment was primarily driven by solidarity with Ethiopia. By the end of the year, Burundian troops also joined the effort. AMISOM's initial mandate did not permit the use of offensive force, resulting in limited involvement in the conflict between Ethiopian forces and the insurgency. This dynamic led to growing tensions between AMISOM and the ENDF, exacerbated by a lack of transparency from Ethiopia regarding its objectives within Somalia.

Days before AMISOM deployed in Somalia, violence in Mogadishu began rapidly escalating. On 6 March 2007, the first Ugandan African Union troops landed at Mogadishu airport alongside three military vehicles. The European Union was reportedly 'exceptionally unhappy' about the heavy US support for the full scale invasion in December, and held back funds for the newly created AMISOM mission for several months.

=== Rise of the insurgency (February–April 2007) ===
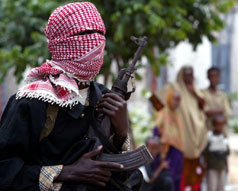
Somali insurgent opposing the Ethiopian military occupation during 2007

Early 2007 saw Somalis rally behind what was referred to as the Muqawama (resistance) or Kacdoon (uprising). The presence of the Ethiopians proved to be deeply unpopular and fomented the rise of an insurgency. Former commanders of the Somali National Army had joined the Muqawama and trained recruits in small arms fire. Both the insurgency and the Ethiopian backed TFG began to use child soldiers. In late February and early March 2007, attacks on ENDF/TFG forces in Mogadishu became a daily occurrence, growing in both complexity and sophistication.

During March, the resistance began in earnest with units of Somali guerillas engaging in routine hit-and-run attacks on Ethiopian military positions in Mogadishu. The Ethiopian military response was characterized by large scale and indiscriminate artillery and aerial bombardments of civilian areas. Ethiopian and TFG troops began suffering mounting casualties to the insurgency. TFG President Abdullahi Yusuf declared in a telephone interview with al-Sharq al-Awsat that no ICU leadership would be allowed to partake in the national reconciliation process. In the ensuing days, insurgent activities intensified further. Between 16 and 18 March 2007, there was a rapid escalation in attacks. A large ENDF convoy was ambushed, leading to a major battle near Mogadishu port, and a high-ranking TFG regional police commander was assassinated in Kismayo. The TFG began to run into increasing opposition from remnants of the Islamic Courts Union, and despite moving much of the government in January to Mogadishu, many ministers chose to remain in Baidoa.

During 2007, members of the Islamic Courts led the resistance to the occupation, attracting significant support from Somalis in the Banaadir region and from Somalis across the world. Al-Shabaab did not heavily participate in the insurgency or large scale fighting for much of 2007, opting instead to carry out bombings and assassinations while further establishing itself.

By the end of March, the fighting intensified in Mogadishu, erupting into a largescale urban warfare, and more than a thousand people, mostly civilians, were killed. ICU insurgents, volunteers, clan militia and other Islamist groups engaged in fierce rounds of fighting in dense urban eras for several weeks during March and April against ENDF/TFG forces. The Ethiopians were surprised by the intensity of the emerging insurgency and began unleashing their firepower on the city in response.

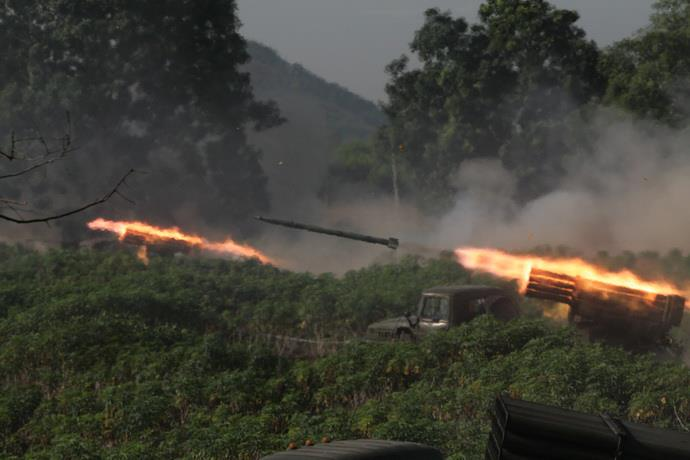
BM-21 Grad rocket artillery vehicles were used extensively by the Ethiopian National Defense Force during the shelling of Mogadishu

In a bid to crush the insurgency, Ethiopian/TFG forces besieged entire neighborhoods and initiated a campaign of mass arrests. Ethiopian troops launched major offensives in the city, using large scale bombardments with rockets and artillery on Mogadishu neighborhoods deemed to be insurgent strongholds. On several occasions the ENDF also occupied and looted the city's hospitals. Ethiopian troops were primarily responsible for the large scale bombardment and significant civilian losses that occurred in the city during March and April 2007. Human Rights Watch reported that the Ethiopian army extensively used BM-21 Grad rocket shelling to bombard densely populated Mogadishu neighborhoods, which the organization described as a violation of international humanitarian law.

During the fierce fighting, the Ethiopian army reportedly engaged in the carpet bombing of neighborhoods. TFG President Abdullahi Yusuf announced in a radio address that "any place from which a bullet is fired, we will bombard it, regardless of whoever is there." The presence of Ethiopian troops reinforced the authoritarian behavior of the TFG. Time magazine reported that the battles raging in the Mogadishu at the time were 'some of the most savage fighting' the capital had ever experienced. An Ilyushin Il-76 military transport plane was struck by insurgent RPG fire on 9 March, and another Il-76 was shot down on 23 March while it was taking off from Mogadishu airport. The bodies of ENDF troops were dragged through the streets during the fighting for the city and an Ethiopian helicopter gunship was shot down by Somali fighters using portable surface-to-air missiles.

By April, a third of Mogadishu's buildings were in ruins along with much of the city's modest economic infrastructure. According to Kenyan journalist Salim Lone, ENDF and TFG forces deliberately blockaded the delivery of urgently needed humanitarian supplies and food in an attempt to 'terrify and intimidate' civilians associated with those challenging the military occupation. The European Union dispatched a letter to Abdullahi Yusuf criticizing the bombardment of civilians areas, the TFG's blockade of humanitarian aid and the pillaging of relief supplies by TFG forces. The EU demanded that the TFG put an end to what it described as, "unacceptable practices". The Ethiopians characterized the violence in this period as being part of a 'final push' against the rebels, but the fierce fighting in Mogadishu during March and April 2007 failed to quell the growing insurgency.

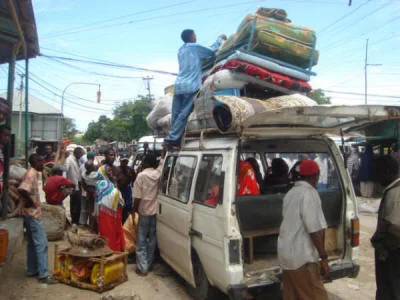
Civilians undergo a mass exodus from Mogadishu to escape BM-21 Grad bombardments by the ENDF (21 April 2007)

==== Rise of al-Shabaab ====
Many members and affiliates of the Islamic Courts Union had been killed during the invasion, leaving a vacuum for the small group of several hundred youth that served as the ICU's Shabaab militia to gain prominence by presenting itself as a resistance movement to an Ethiopian military occupation. Many ordinary citizens had been radicalized by the US-backed Ethiopian invasion, enabling al-Shabaab to firmly embed itself in the regions social, economic and political environment. The invasion of Somalia resulted in increased radicalization within al-Shabaab itself, coalesced widespread support for the group and massively increased recruitment for the organization.

The invasion was the group's primary catalyst for mobilization among the population and it garnered substantial support from across clan lines. Despite its hardline ideology, it was widely perceived as a genuine resistance force against the military occupation by many Somalis, and while not universally popular, it was widely acknowledged for its formidability and effectiveness in pushing out Ethiopian troops. Heavy handed tactics and blatant disregard for civilian life by the Ethiopians rallied many to support al-Shabaab as it successfully branded itself as the most determined and uncompromising resistance faction. The group was not a monolithic entity at the time and for several years following as effectively represented an alliance of insurgent groups.

Al-Shabaab forces carried out the first suicide attack of the insurgency phase of the war on 27 March 2007, against an ENDF checkpoint in Tarbuunka, Mogadishu, using a car bomb. The explosion killed 63 Ethiopian soldiers and wounded another 50. The operation was reported to have been made in retribution for the torture and rape of a Somali woman at gunpoint by Ethiopian troops. Adam Salad Adam, was later announced as the bomber responsible for the operation. It was the first filmed suicide attack in Somalia, and a Shabaab propaganda film was released two days after it occurred.

=== Widening of conflict and rebel consolidation (May–December 2007) ===
During May, an additional 15,000 Ethiopian troops were deployed to Somalia. The Ogaden National Liberation Front (ONLF) issued a statement declaring its solidarity with the insurgency, and along with other armed groups in Ethiopia – escalated the insurgency in the Ogaden in response to the invasion. The Ethiopian government accused ICU fighters of fighting alongside the ONLF during the April 2007 Abole raid.

In mid-2007, as the ENDF was getting mired in the insurgency, Prime Minister Meles Zenawi publicly stated that the Ethiopian government had "made a wrong political calculation" by invading Somalia. Many Mogadishu businessman and civil leaders reported that they had been unjustly labelled as being al-Qaeda, following which they were ransacked by ENDF/TFG forces. On 3 June 2007, there was an assassination attempt on TFG prime minister Ali Mohamed Ghedi with a truck bomb. By July 2007, the insurgency had into spread to the greater Banaadir region, Middle Shabelle, Lower Shabelle and the Jubba Valley. After a short lull in the fighting during August 2007 that saw Meles Zenawi claim the fighting to be over, violence in Mogadishu escalated sharply that same month. Ethiopian troops used tanks and heavy artillery to bombard insurgent strongholds in the capital, resulting in the worst mass exodus in the city's history. The ENDF used white phosphorus munitions in densely populated residential areas and carried widespread looting during raids of Mogadishu neighborhoods, with valuables later appearing in black markets in Addis Ababa. The Bakaara Market was also looted by ENDF/TFG forces. The escalating insurgency during the latter half of 2007 resulted in the deployment of an additional 10,000 Ethiopian troops in Mogadishu and its environs. During September 2007, the Alliance for the Re-liberation of Somalia (ARS) was formed. Al-Shabaab spokesman Mukhtar Robow stated that the group did not recognize and had no relationship with the ARS.

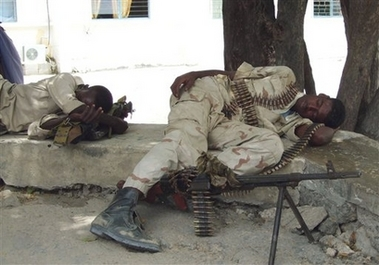
TFG forces in Mogadishu (November 2007)

As fighting in Mogadishu escalated, ICU insurgents in southern Somalia found a window of opportunity and peacefully captured the town of Dhobley near the Kenyan border in mid-October. At the end of October 2007, some of the heaviest fighting in months broke out between the ENDF and ICU insurgents in the capital when Ethiopian troops launched an offensive on ICU positions. From November, more large scale fighting occurred in Mogadishu; during which the bodies of Ethiopian troops were dragged through the city streets. By November, small pockets of Islamic Courts Union control were appearing in various places across the country. In December 2007, the ENDF withdrew from the strategic town of Guriel, which was then taken quickly over by insurgents.

At the end of the year, the UNHCR estimated 1,000,000 people had been displaced by the war. Thousands of Somalis had been killed by the Ethiopian army. The United Nations reported the crisis as being the worst ever humanitarian crises in Africa. The TFG announced that most of the country was not under its control and claimed that the ICU was regrouping, which the Ethiopian government denied. Al-Jazeera reported that fighting between the ENDF/TFG and Islamic Courts forces in 2007 had resulted in several thousand civilian deaths in Mogadishu.

The Ethiopians and Transitional Federal Government had little public support, and Ethiopian troops rarely conducted patrols due to frequent losses to Somali insurgents. ENDF military losses had reached unsustainable levels by the end of 2007 and an excess of 50,000 ENDF troops were deployed in Somalia. Thousands of Ethiopian troops had been killed during the fighting for Mogadishu in 2007. Oxford Analytica observed at the end of 2007 that the Ethiopian army aimed to win a war of attrition against the insurgency, but Ethiopia was effectively bogged down and facing a multi front war, with no prospect of victory. Throughout the year the ENDF had repeatedly claimed it was drawing down its forces in Somalia, though none occurred.

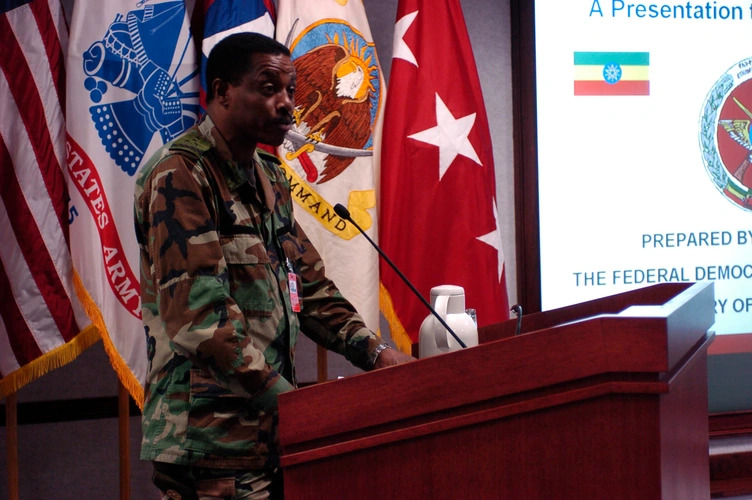
Major Gen. Bacha Buta of the ENDF giving remarks at US Army Central Headquarters regarding lessons learned during invasion of Somalia (2007)

The tactics of the Somalis fighting the Ethiopian military occupation increasingly came to resemble the Iraqi insurgency. The presence of US military reconnaissance aircraft over Mogadishu was observed by journalists and rumor had spread among the population that US Special Forces were aiding Ethiopian troops in the city. According to Professor Abdi Ismail Samatar, as the insurgency grew in strength, it became clear to the Americans that the Ethiopian military occupation was doomed to fail, prompting them to focus on engineering a split within the Islamic resistance movement.

== 2008 ==
By the beginning of 2008, insurgent pressure had mounted on the Ethiopian and TFG troops in the south-central regions of Somalia. The Shabeelle, the Jubba Valley along with the Bay and Bakool regions in particular became hot spots. Islamist fighters gained strength and were able to move from different towns with little resistance as they had accrued significant public support. What had at first seemed to be a series of probes soon morphed into a significant insurgent offensive against Ethiopian and TFG forces. At the start of the year substantial numbers of Ethiopian troops were still deployed in Somalia. No drawdown of forces had occurred since their arrival. During January 2008, Seyum Mesfin, the Ethiopian Foreign Minister claimed that Mogadishu and Somalia had significantly improved since the invasion and that there were no longer any 'no go zones' in the country. More than 60% of Mogadishu's population had fled the city by the start of the year. Philippe Lazzarini, the United Nations' top humanitarian official, declared Somalia to be the worst humanitarian crisis in Africa and nearly the worst in the world.

The TFG parliament was purged of opposition figures and represented a narrow coalition of Somali society. The government was besieged and dysfunctional, with virtually no progress being made for political transition. The government was plagued with charges of corruption and abuse, including the obstruction of relief aid deliveries. The TFG's police and military forces were notoriously undisciplined, committing numerous acts of murder and sexual violence against civilians. The security forces effectively operated as uniformed clan militia who were loyal to their individual commanders and only nominally under the control of the government. In many instances they were hostile to one another and internal splits even resulted in shootouts between units as they fought over control of revenue from illegal checkpoints. During 2008, TFG President Abdullahi Yusuf began undermining the new Prime Minister, Nur Hassan Hussein. PM Nur had replaced PM Ali Gedi in November 2007, who was widely viewed as corrupt and an impediment to the reconciliation process. In an attempt to undermine an emerging alliance between opposition groups and PM Nur, President Yusuf had TFG forces engage in widespread looting at the Bakaara Market to impede Nur's effort. Much of the criminality in south Somalia during 2008 was linked to TFG security forces. In April 2008, Oxford Analytica observed that the TFG was 'little more' than a collection of armed rival groups.

Major Abdirahman O. Warsame, head of TFG presidential security detail, accused the ENDF of orchestrating the murder of Somali officers who refused to obey their orders and shelling the positions of TFG forces hostile to them. In one instance TFG and ENDF soldiers came to blows over the sexual assault of a Somali woman. Warsame accused the Ethiopians of seeking the undermine the establishment of a Somali National Army and provoking TFG officers with indiscriminate violence against civilians.

In early 2008, a UN report alleged that ENDF, TFG, and AMISOM forces were profiting millions from arms trafficking in Somalia. The Swiss newspaper Le Temps reported that the large volume of Ethiopian military arms and ammunition being sold suggested high-level involvement within the ENDF as commanders often resold weapons seized from insurgents for profit. While the Ethiopian Defense Ministry was seemingly unaware, it was observed that such large-scale trafficking would have been impossible without complicity from top ENDF figures.

=== Escalation of insurgency (January–May 2008) ===
Islamist insurgents began adopting sophisticated strategies to win greater public support and legitimacy. To fill in the void left by the Transitional Federal Government, insurgents began to deploy mobile Sharia courts to administer justice while apprehending criminals. They also began clan conflict mediation and distributing aid to the impoverished. Attacks on highway bandits and militia checkpoints became frequent. Ethiopian military war crimes aimed at crushing the insurgency served only to strengthen resistance. The insurgency waged an increasingly complex war against the ENDF and TFG. A targeted assassination campaign was initiated against the TFG, primarily aimed at the National Security Agency (NSA), resulting in many NSA agents and informants being assassinated in 2008. Insurgent attacks further increased in complexity and sophistication, with attacks killing scores of Ethiopian and TFG troops weekly. In February 2008, Al Shabaab captured the town of Dinsoor after probing it several times. This marked a change in their strategy which previously focused mainly on the capital Mogadishu. Al-Shabaab began governing territory for the first time in 2008 as it started taking control of significant tracts of southern Somalia. In March, the ICU seized the city of Buloburde and freed many prisoners. At the end of March 2008 a battle erupted in Mogadishu after TFG forces began robbing a marketplace, resulting Islamist insurgents inflicting heavy losses on the TFG forces after they came to defend the merchants.

In the Ogaden (Somali Region), the Ogaden National Liberation Front, which had declared solidarity with the insurgency against Ethiopian troops in Somalia, engaged in repeated skirmishes with the ENDF. During 2008, the Ethiopian government did not have effective control of much of the Ogaden. Addis Ababa began calling on the Puntland and Somaliland regions to assist it in dismantling ONLF networks within Somalia. Puntland security services arrested members of the ONLF central committee in Garowe, while Somaliland security forces raided ONLF arms caches in Burao. The ONLF reported that Puntland had turned over several of its leading members to Ethiopian security forces.

During the April 2008 Battle of Mogadishu, the al-Hidaya Mosque massacre was carried out by Ethiopian troops, inflaming the insurgency. Tigrayan ENDF troops repeatedly looted Mogadishu's Bakaara Market and Somali telecom companies such as Hormuud became a target for looting and vandalism by the Ethiopian army. Voice of America reported that month that the insurgency was effectively being waged by two distinct groups, the nationalist leaning ICU insurgents and the increasingly international jihadist oriented al-Shabaab. Residents reported that Islamic Courts insurgents had far more popular support than al-Shabaab and receiving significant funds from both the local business communities and the Somali diaspora. The boldest insurgent expansion occurred in April 2008, when Islamist fighters seized control of Jowhar, only 90 km away from the capital Mogadishu. In late May, Jilib and Harardhere fell under the control of insurgents, who then began advancing on the strategic southern port city of Kismayo. Representatives of both the Islamic Courts and al-Shabaab entered into a secretive agreement to allow the clan militia in power to remain, though al-Shabaab overran the city later in August.

==== US airstrikes ====
On 3 March 2008, the United States launched cruise missiles on the town of Dhobley where insurgent leader Hassan Turki was reported to have been present. According to AP, US officials claimed the town was held by Islamic extremists but gave few details to the press. Dhobley was the last town the ICU held a year prior and it had been bombed by US aircraft in that period. A month later on 1 May 2008, US Tomahawk missiles bombarded Dhusamareb resulting in the assassination of al-Shabaab leader Aden Hashi Eyrow along with another senior commander and several civilians. The attack did nothing to slow down the groups participation in the insurgency. The assassination of Ayro during early 2008 resulted in a sharp radicalization of al-Shabaab. The killing of Ayro led to foreign fighters integrating within the ranks of the organization and resulted in the accession of Ahmed Godane as Emir. This change in leadership was facilitated by American intervention and had significant effect on Shabaab's future decision making regarding the usage of tactics such as suicide bombing.

On 18 March 2008, the US designated al-Shabaab a terrorist organization. According to the Institute for Security Studies, the designation of al-Shabaab as a terrorist organization was an obstacle to the ongoing peace process, as by mid-2008 the popularity of the insurgency had indicated there was a, "thin line if any, between the UIC, Al Shabab and the Somali people" The terror designation proved to be damaging as it isolated moderate voices among the Islamist resistance movement and gave al-Shabaab further reason to push against peace talks.

=== Islamist territorial expansion and Djibouti Agreement (June–August 2008) ===
By mid-2008, al-Shabaab, Islamic Courts Union loyalists and supporters of the Alliance for the Re-liberation of Somalia (ARS) were the primary insurgent forces operating in Somalia. The Mogadishu-Afgooye-Baidoa highway became a focal point for ICU and al-Shabaab insurgents, while attacks also began escalating in and around Baidoa. By July, ICU forces controlled the cities of Beledweyne and Wajid. That month forces loyal to the ICU forces fought the ENDF over Hiiraan region and fighting continued in the capital. The ENDF shelled the western part of Beledweyne with rocket and mortar fire, resulting in an exodus of civilians and the city saw fierce fighting between Courts fighters and the Ethiopian army in the following weeks.

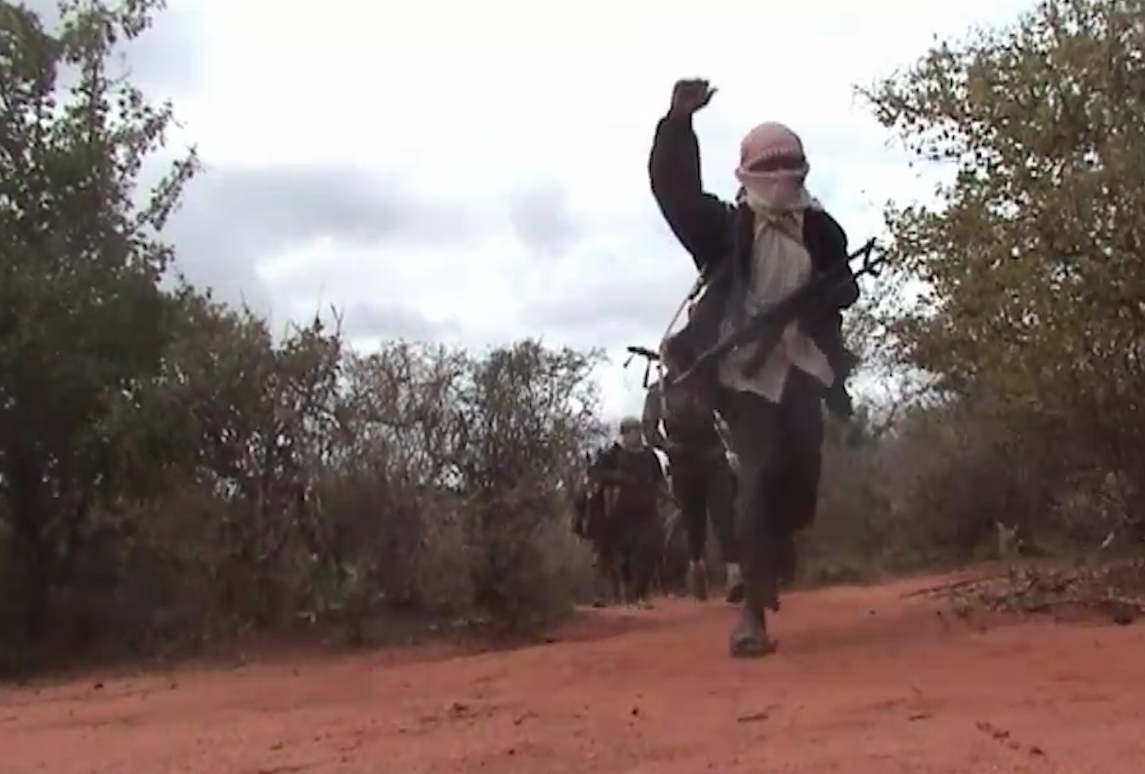
Al-Shabaab insurgents marching through Bay region (15 July 2008)

During June a faction of the ARS and the TFG signed a ceasefire agreement after months of talks in Djibouti. The agreement was met with resistance from elements within the TFG, chiefly President Abdullahi Yusuf. The Djibouti Peace Process called for the withdrawal of Ethiopian troops from Somalia. During June 2008 the ICU publicly declared it would continue its attacks on ENDF/TFG bases and a new Islamic court was opened in Jowhar. At the time the TFG was crippled by infighting and largely under the control of warlords as insurgent attacks worsened by the day.

By mid-2008, President Yusuf had lost all the support he had accumulated in the international community. His primary backer, Ethiopia, had also become tired of the TFG president only offering military answers to serious political issues. According to Africa Intelligence, Ethiopian Foreign Minister Seyoum Mesfin had angrily told Abdullahi Yusuf, "...you're not a real president!" during a heated exchange. After this comment from the Ethiopians the director general of Yusuf's office expressed fears that the survival of the TFG was in serious jeopardy. Many members of the ICU and other resistance factions such as Al-Shabaab were alienated by Sharif Sheikh Ahmed's conduct during the Djibouti negotiations, particularly after he signed the peace deal without consulting field commanders-despite the continued presence of Ethiopian troops. ICU personnel in Mogadishu during this period viewed Sharif's behavior as unprincipled.

As the insurgency gained most of the territory that had been lost by the Islamic Courts Union during December 2006 and January 2007, fractures began appearing between the different insurgent factions over the Djibouti Agreement. In Beledweyne and Jalalaqsi, the insurgents in power distanced themselves from both al-Shabaab and the ARS. Al-Shabaab was estimated to be 2,000 strong by the AU during 2008, an increase from several hundred at the end of 2006.

=== Insurgent victory (September–December 2008) ===
During Autumn of 2008, the insurgency controlled more than 80% of the territory that had been previously lost in the invasion. Analysts described the situation for the Ethiopian army in this period as there being "no light at the end of the tunnel". As the situation rapidly deteriorated for the military occupation in mid-2008, Ethiopian troops started experiencing desertions. The ENDF began to draw down its forces deployed in Mogadishu and across towns in Somalia. The occupation had a 'corrosive effect' on the ENDF and the Somalia deployment was viewed as a hardship post. Ethiopian troops sustained heavy casualties in the war before the Djibouti Peace Process called for their withdrawal. More than 80% of TFG military and security forces, nearly 15,000 personnel, deserted the government by the end of 2008. The remaining TFG forces suffered from low morale and also experienced desertions, with many troops continually selling their weapons at local arms markets; only for the weapons to come into the hands of insurgents.

During September 2008 fierce battles raged between the insurgency and ENDF in the capital. Sources in the TFG reported to Al-Jazeera that American intelligence officers were present at Ethiopian bases in the city in order to monitor the military situation and were actively encouraging the ENDF to strike insurgent strongholds such as the Bakaara Market. By October 2008, virtually all opposition groups in the Ethiopian parliament had come to the consensus that the ENDF should be withdrawn from Somalia. On 26 October, a ceasefire agreement was signed between the Alliance for the Re-liberation of Somalia and the TFG. It was to go into effect on 5 November.

Footage uploaded on Islamic Courts insurgent website of an ENDF officer and TFG soldiers defecting to ICU fighters in Mogadishu (7 Sep 2008)

By November 2008, insurgency had effectively won. The majority of south and central Somalia, along with the capital was now under the control of Islamist factions. Ethiopia had redeployed much of its army out of Somalia by the end of the year. The success of the insurgents largely represented ordinary Somalis desire to see an end to the anarchy and occupation, as the TFG was dysfunctional.

That same month, ICU insurgents controlled the key cities of Jowhar and Beledweyne. The TFG lost control of the vital port city Merca when the city fell to the insurgency. Al-Shabaab was consolidating a string of military successes and soon began threatening Mogadishu. On 14 November Shabaab forces pushed only 15 km from Mogadishu near ENDF troops positions. Other insurgent factions, such as the Islamic Courts captured towns such as Elas, only 16 km away from the capital. Despite the Ethiopian presence in Mogadishu, by November 2008 insurgents openly walked on the streets.

By the end of 2008, al-Shabaab had emerged as one Somalia's most dominant insurgent factions, eclipsing the influence of the Islamic Courts. Some foreign diplomats feared that al-Shabaab would wage an all out war against other insurgents following the Ethiopian withdrawal. While al-Shabaab had gained substantial popularity for its fight against the Ethiopians, much of the Somali public that once supported the group had grown disillusioned due to its increasingly heavy-handed tactics. In October 2008, fighters loyal to the Islamic Courts Union and al-Shabaab fought each other in Balad.

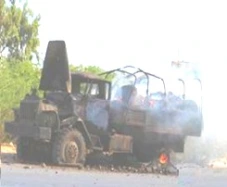
ENDF Ural in Mogadishu destroyed in an ambush while resupplying besieged troops (22 Nov 2008)

==== Collapse of first TFG government and formation of coalition government ====
Mired by infighting, the TFG was once again on the brink of collapse. President Abdullahi Yusuf admitted that the country was slipping to the insurgency and "raised the prospect his government could completely collapse." Ethiopia announced it would withdraw its troops from Somalia by the end of 2008 on 28 November.

After long talks in Djibouti over a ceasefire between the TFG and the Alliance for the Reliberation of Somalia, agreement was reached in late November that parliament be doubled in size to include 200 representatives of the ARS along with 75 representatives of the civil society. A new president and prime minister would be elected by the new parliament, and a commission to look into crimes of war would be established. A new constitution was also agreed to be drafted. The International Crisis Group issued a statement declaring that, despite the international community's reluctance to engage with the Islamist opposition, the only viable path to stabilizing the security situation was to reach out and engage directly with its leaders.

In December 2008, the TFG parliament moved to impeach President Abdullahi Yusuf, accusing him of being a dictator and an obstacle to peace. After TFG prime minister Nur Hassan had blamed Yusuf for the TFG's failures, Yusuf had fired him without the required approval of parliament. The TFG once again found itself based largely out of Baidoa and the African Union released a statement declaring the insurgency controlled most the country. That month President Yusuf resigned after stating that he had lost control of the country to Islamist insurgents.

Ethiopian president Meles Zenawi declared the mission had been a success, but the operation had proved to be effectively futile as the transitional government Ethiopia had backed during the war found itself completely powerless in the lead up to the ENDF withdrawal.

== 2009 ==
The TFG failed to make any meaningful impact on the ground during is tenure and presided over one of the bloodiest periods in modern Somali history. During January 2009, the first Transitional Federal Government collapsed and al-Shabaab overran the seat of the government in Baidoa.

ENDF troops withdrew out of Somalia that month, ending the Ethiopian military occupation, and former Islamic Courts Union leader Sharif Sheikh Ahmed was elected as the 7th president of Somalia at the end of January.

=== Ethiopian withdrawal ===
Early during December 2008, Ethiopia announced it would withdraw its troops from Somalia shortly. Under the cover of the Djibouti agreement and the resulting peace negotiations, Ethiopia attempted to save face after its forces were exhausted and effectively defeated by the relentless Somali guerrilla warfare.

On 12 January 2009, the last ENDF troops departed from Mogadishu, ending the two-year long occupation of the capital. Thousands of residents came to Mogadishu Stadium to cheer the withdrawal, and for a period of time the city remained quiet as rivaling insurgent factions cooperated. The Ethiopian military occupation failed. By the time of the withdrawal, the TFG possessed control over only a few streets and buildings in Mogadishu with the rest of the city coming under control of Islamist factions, particularly Shabaab.

The withdrawal of Ethiopian troops sapped al-Shabaab of the widespread support it had enjoyed from civilians and across clan lines during the occupation. The groups significant support from the Somali diaspora dwindled in response to the usage of terror tactics. However, the withdrawal came too late to have a substantial impact on the al-Shabaab's transformation into a formidable oppositional force.

=== Election of Sharif Sheikh Ahmed ===
After the parliament took in 200 officials from the 'moderate' Islamist opposition, ARS leader Sharif Sheikh Ahmed was elected TFG President on 31 January 2009. Al Shabaab rejected any peace deal and continued to take territories, including Baidoa. Another Islamist group, Ahlu Sunna Waljama'a, which is allied to the TFG and supported by Ethiopia, continued to attack al-Shabaab.

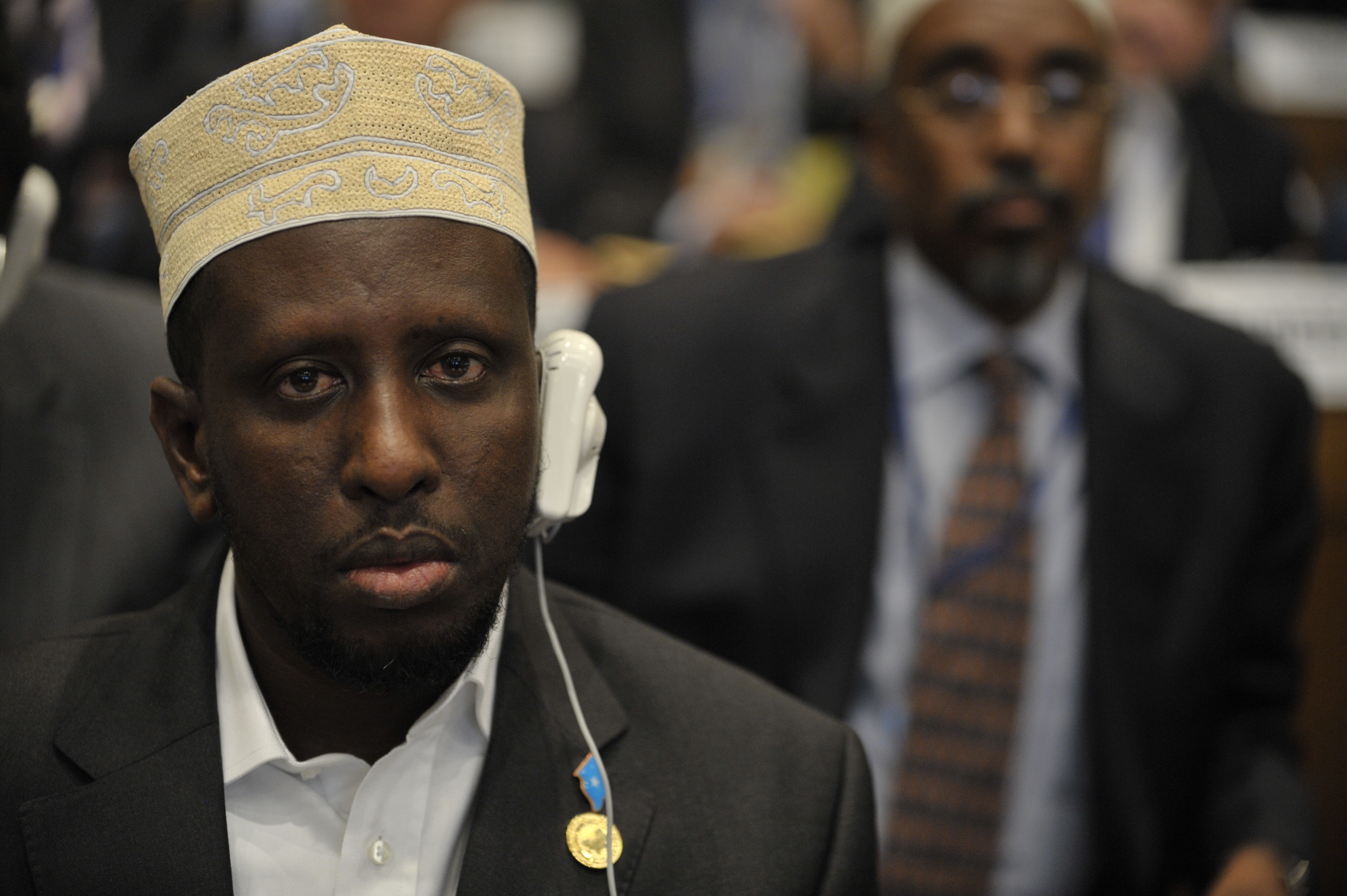
Former head of the Islamic Courts Union and TFG President Sharif Ahmed, at the 12th African Union Summit days after the Ethiopian withdrawal (2 Feb 2009)

Al-Shabaab accused the new TFG President of accepting the secular transitional government and have continued the civil war since he arrived in Mogadishu at the presidential palace.

== Casualties and human rights violations ==
Islamist insurgents, ENDF troops, TFG forces, AMISOM forces, and other involved parties in the conflict sustained considerable casualties. The true extent of these losses remains uncertain, primarily due to a lack of transparency from the involved parties and a dearth of reporting on casualties.

Ethiopian forces in Somalia sustained heavy casualties but the extent and figure of losses remain uncertain, primarily due to censorship on the war enforced by the Ethiopian government from 2006 to 2009. In early 2007, NBC News reported that a blackout of information regarding the war prevailed within Ethiopia. Opposition groups in the Ethiopian Parliament were never informed on the number of soldiers who had been killed in Somalia, a policy which the TPLF continued until and after the withdrawal. Urban warfare in Mogadishu proved to be especially difficult for the Ethiopian army and caused heavy losses. Thousands of ENDF troops had been killed during fierce fighting for Mogadishu during 2007. By the end of 2007, Ethiopian casualties had reached an 'unsustainable level'. Residents in Mogadishu estimated a rate of approximately 200 casualties weekly. Independent experts reported the Ethiopian military casualty rate was around 100 troops a week towards the end of the occupation in 2008. Estimates of losses are further complicated by the practice of Ethiopian troops routinely disguising themselves in Somali TFG uniforms to conceal their presence. Al-Shabaab operations between 2007 and 2009 resulted in the deaths of over a thousand Ethiopian troops alone. A 2009 report by an independent regional security agency estimated at least 3,773 Ethiopian troops had died in Somalia since late 2006.

Shortly after the January 2009 withdrawal, Ethiopian Prime Minister Meles Zenawi publicly declined to reveal the number of Ethiopian military casualties incurred during the occupation, stating on national television:

''...regarding the details on those killed or wounded in Somalia, I think the House does not need to know about how many were killed or wounded...I also think that I do not have an obligation to present such report."

The figures for AMISOM troops killed in Somalia from their deployment in early 2007 to 2009 has also never been publicly revealed. African Union officials only publicly commented on casualty estimates on their entire operation for the first time in 2023. AMISOM suffered several hundred casualties, but the figure from 2006 to 2009 is unknown. Ugandan Peoples Defence Forces (UPDF), was one of the largest AMISOM contingents, but never published figures on troop casualties. Troops deployed to Mogadishu from TFG President Yusuf's home region of Puntland in support of his government suffered heavy casualties.

=== Civilian casualties and war crimes ===
Ethiopian troops and Transitional Federal Government forces committed serious human rights abuses and war crimes, including murder, rape, assault, and looting. In the December 2008 report 'So much to Fear' Human Rights Watch warned that since the ENDF had invaded Somalia was facing a humanitarian catastrophe on a scale not witnessed since the early 1990s. They went on to accuse the TFG of terrorizing the citizens of Mogadishu and the ENDF for increasing violent criminality. The Danish Institute for International Studies described Ethiopian counterinsurgency as indiscriminate in nature and "very dirty". Amnesty International stated testimony it had received during the conflict suggested all parties had committed war crimes, but that Ethiopian troops were the worst violators. The ENDF and allied militia in Somalia were accused of crimes against humanity as the conflict became one of the worst humanitarian crises in the Africa. Ethiopian forces used white phosphorus munitions in residential areas of Mogadishu, resulting in civilian fatalities. By November 2007, the figure of displaced from the war topped one million. Around 600,000 people had fled from Mogadishu alone, accounting for 60% percent of the capital's population.

Under the command of Colonel Gabre Heard, nicknamed 'Butcher of Mogadishu', soldiers from the Tigrayan Peoples Liberation Front (TPLF) participating in the occupation routinely bombed civilian areas and killed thousands. Reports of atrocities by forces under his command have made him infamous in Somalia. Officials in the Federal Government of Somalia in particular singled out the TPLF militia for war crimes in both Somalia and the Ogaden during 2007. Ethiopian troops engaged in extensive wartime sexual violence, acts of looting and murder. American reporters touring rural Somalia reported that in village after village, locals had described a reign of terror by the Ethiopian army. Amnesty International accused the Ethiopian military of engaging in throat-slitting executions of Somalis during early 2008, including on children in front of their parents. One of the most notorious incidents was on 19 April 2008, when Ethiopian soldiers committed the al-Hidaya Mosque massacre. After attacks on civilian areas in Mogadishu during 2007, European lawyers considered whether funding for Ethiopia and TFG made the EU complicit in war crimes, the deliberations of which were never made public. Ethiopian PM Meles Zenawi publicly dismissed reports of war crimes from the international media and human rights groups as a 'smear campaign' against the ENDF in Somalia.

In December 2008, the Elman Peace and Human Rights Organisation said it had verified that 16,210 civilians had been killed and 29,000 wounded since the start of the war in December 2006. In 2024 the Somali governments Foreign Minister accused the Ethiopian army of killing 20,000 civilians. The Ogaden National Liberation Front accused the ENDF of hunting down Somalis from the Ogaden clan and Oromos residing in Somalia for arbitrary detention and executions during the military occupation.

== Result and consequences ==
By the end of the occupation, the majority of the territory seized from the Islamic Courts Union during the December 2006 and January 2007 invasion had fallen under the control of various Islamist and nationalist resistance groups. The invasion failed to empower the Transitional Federal Government, which only controlled parts of Mogadishu and its original 2006 capital of Baidoa by the last weeks of the military occupation. The Ethiopian army withdrew from Somalia with significant casualties and little to show for their efforts. The insurgency had achieved its primary goal of removing the Ethiopian military presence from most of Somalia by November 2008 and was successful in achieving several of its most important demands.

During 2007 and 2008, Somalia plunged into severe levels of armed conflict, marked by frequent assassinations, political meltdown, radicalization, and the growth of an intense anti-American sentiment. The situation in the country exceeded the worst-case scenarios envisioned by many regional analysts when they first considered the potential impact of an Ethiopian military occupation. A Royal Institute of International Affairs report observed that Ethiopian/American support for the TFG instead of the more popular Islamic Courts administration presented an obstacle, not contribution, to the reconstruction of Somalia. Human Rights Watch accused the United States of "breeding the very extremism that it is supposed to defeat" by backing the invasion. According to Roland Marchal, the US-backed Ethiopian invasion had "removed the conditions for national authority in Somalia" and had marked an end to the process of centralisation in the country. He further contended that Ethiopian concerns regarding the ICU had little to do with Islamism, which instead provided a convenient cover for what he described as their "hidden agenda" in Somalia.

For the Americans the invasion had resulted in nearly the complete opposite of what had been expected, as it had failed to isolate the Islamic movement while solidifying Somali anger to both the United States and Ethiopia. The result of the invasion had been the defeat of Somali Islamists considered to be 'moderate' while strengthening the movements most radical elements. In 2010, US ambassador to Ethiopia Donald Yamamoto stated that the Ethiopian invasion had been a mistake and "not a really good idea". By the US military's own metrics, the war in Somalia was never effectively prosecuted. A 2007 study commissioned by United States Department of Defense warned that American participation in the war was, "...plagued by a failure to define the parameters of the conflict or its aims; an overemphasis on military measures without a clear definition of the optimal military strategy;" According to the Conciliation Resources report titled 'Endless War':

Military occupation, a violent insurgency, rising jihadism, and massive population displacement has reversed the incremental political and economic progress achieved by the late 1990s in south-central Somalia. With 1.3 million people displaced by fighting since 2006, 3.6 million people in need of emergency food aid, and 60,000 Somalis a year fleeing the country, the people of south-central Somalia face the worst humanitarian crisis since the early 1990s.

As part of the United States' War on terror, Ethiopia became a key strategic ally for US policy and Western interests in the Horn of Africa. In 2006, the Ethiopian government established the Information Network Security Agency (INSA) with support from the United States, modeling it after the American's National Security Agency (NSA). Initially tasked with intercepting and analyzing intelligence, particularly from Somalia at the time of the invasion, INSA gradually expanded its role into domestic surveillance. Among its first members was Abiy Ahmed, who later ascended through the ranks of government and became Ethiopia's Prime Minister.

As the ENDF withdrew from Somalia, tensions between the differing resistance factions exacerbated. By the end of 2008, most elements of the pre-invasion Islamic Courts had merged into one of the two wings of the Alliance for the Re-liberation of Somalia or had joined al-Shabaab. Some Islamic factions continued operating under the ICU banner into 2009 and tended to support the new TFG government led by Sharif Ahmed, which described the ICU groups as the governments 'paramilitary'. The basis of the present iteration of the Somali National Army stems from the 2008 peace agreement between the ARS and TFG.

=== Radicalization and terrorism ===
The war resulted in the widespread radicalization in Somali society and severely undermined the attempt to create a transitional government. Al-Shabaab experienced its period of greatest growth from 2007 to 2009. In 2024, Somalia's Minister of Justice Hassan Moalim publicly declared the wave of terrorism Somalia was experiencing was the 'direct result' of the 2006 invasion. According to Bronwyn Bruton, a deputy director at the Atlantic Council, the rise of Al-Shabaab had been caused by "...too much meddling by the external community" and that the group "...would not exist today if it hadn't been for the overassertive - brutal, in fact, efforts of the Ethiopian government,"

Al-Shabaab was particularly empowered by the occupation, as it established itself as an independent insurgent faction in early 2007. The group became battle hardened over the next two years and notably began governing territory for the first time in 2008. The war had enabled Al-Shabaab to firmly embed itself in the regions social, economic and political environment. In effect the invasion had morphed al-Shabaab from a fringe movement to a dominant insurgent political force. While Ethiopia had claimed to have eradicated the "extremist threat" when withdrawing from Somalia in January 2009, instead of eliminating jihadist activity, the military occupation had the effect of creating more 'Jihadis' than had ever existed in the country before. By the time of the ENDF withdrawal, al-Shabaab's forces had grown significantly in numbers, swelling from just six hundred to several thousand fighters strong since the invasion began. The majority were youth under the age of 20.

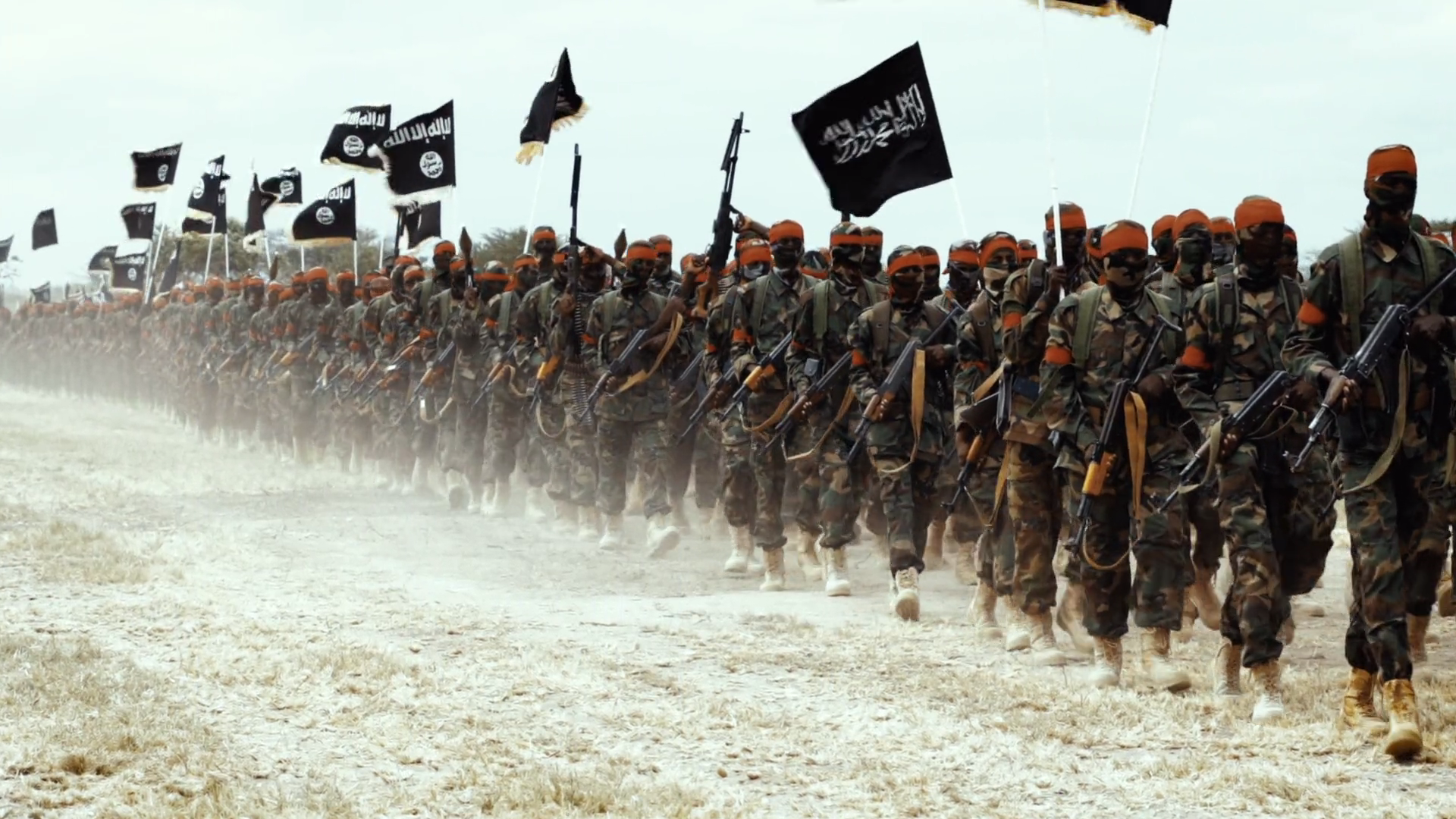
Al-Shabaab military parade in Somalia (2025)

Most people who had joined Al-Shabaab appeared to be motivated by the behavior of Ethiopian troops rather than an ideological commitment to Al-Qaeda's project. Several months after the ENDF withdrawal, Foreign Affairs noted that al-Qaeda's foothold in Somalia post-occupation was in significant part the result of the invasion. After the killing of the group's leader Aden Hashi Ayro in 2008, al-Shabaab began publicly courting Osama bin Laden in a bid to become part of al-Qaeda, but was rebuffed by bin Laden. Following the killing of Osama bin Laden in 2011, al-Shabaab pledged allegiance to al-Qaeda in 2012.

A sharp increase in radical recruitment in Somali diaspora in Europe and the United States since 2007 has been linked with the overthrow of the ICU and the Ethiopian military occupation. This resulted in the first ever American suicide bomber carrying out an attack in Somalia in October 2008. During 2008 there were an estimated 100 foreign fighters in Somalia, a figure which increased to 450 the next year as al-Shabaab gained strength.

=== Piracy ===
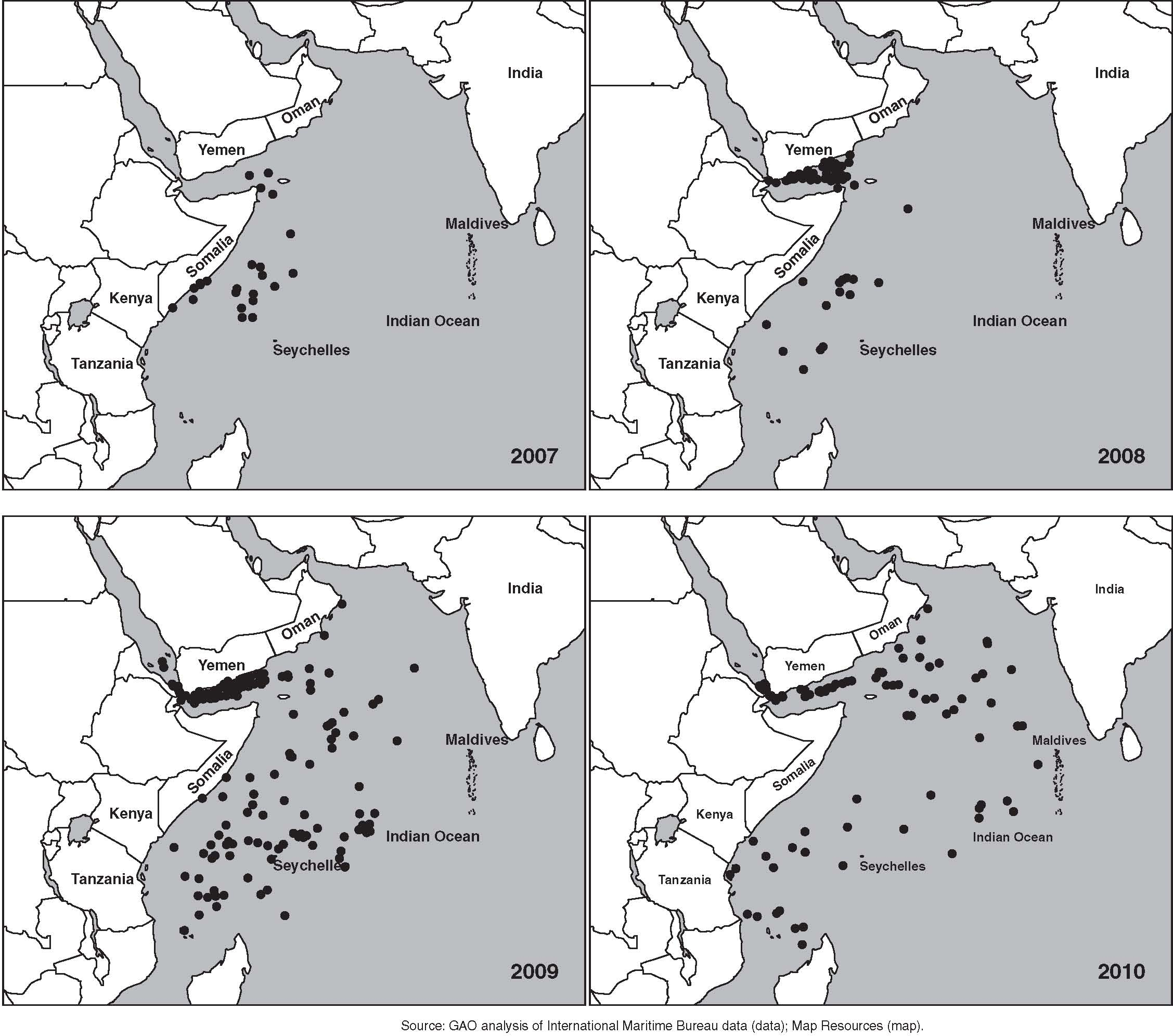
Pirate Attacks off the Coast of Somalia, January 2007 to June 2010

Attacks off the Somali coast were suppressed by anti-piracy operations carried out by the Islamic Courts Union's coast guard during 2006. Following the ICUs overthrow, incidents of pirate attack rapidly proliferated during 2007 and 2008.

Top personnel in the Seafarers' Assistance Programme reported that elements of the TFG and Puntland governments were involved in piracy due to lucrative profits. As the Ethiopian army was being driven from southern and central Somalia by the insurgency, ENDF military bases provided safe havens for Somali pirates who had secured large ransoms; in return for cash payments from the pirates.

== Continuation of the conflict ==
After Sharif Ahmed became TFG president at the end of January 2009, the remaining ICU groups, supporters of the Alliance for the Re-liberation of Somalia and other insurgent/opposition elements effectively disappeared as their members merged into new organizations that aligned with their views or withdrew from politics. Those who did not join the Sharifs government merged with the newly formed Hizbul Islam (Islamic Party), which had formed through a amalgamation of several insurgent groups, or had joined the rapidly growing al-Shabaab. In early 2009 mediation was attempted between Hizbul Islam and the TFG, but top members of Hizbul Islam announced they would continue fighting against AMISOM troops stationed in Somalia. An internal divide was also observed within al-Shabaab as some top leaders such as Mukthar Robow met behind closed doors with President Sharif Ahmed. Sharif called on his former enemies in the TFG and the insurgency to forgive each other for the sake of peace. Other Al-Shabaab leaders declared that Sharif had sided with the United States and vowed to fight his government.

By 2009, al-Shabaab started drastically altering its choice of targets and frequency of attacks. The use of kidnappings and bombings in urban areas significantly grew in use and alienated much of the civilian population. The significant support the group had previously enjoyed from the Somali diaspora dwindled in response to the usage of terror tactics. Some groups continued to operate under the Islamic Courts banner into 2009, and during April of that year ICU fighters attempted to assassinate the commander of Al-Shabaab's "death squad" in Mogadishu, leading to Shabaab ordering attacks against the remaining ICU forces. During May 2009 Al-Shabaab forces attempted to topple the pro-government ICU administration in Beledweyne.

Ethiopia, the TFG's closest ally during 2004 to 2009, had taken the lead in training and integrating a Somali army but failed. Between 2004 and 2008, over 10,000 Ethiopian trained TFG soldiers deserted or defected to the insurgency. When Ethiopian forces withdrew from Somalia in early 2009, the task of forming a new army was given to AMISOM. At this point there was still no meaningful army chain of command. Despite the withdrawal of most ENDF troops following the 2008 Djibouti Agreement, there has been a continued occupation of Somalia by the Ethiopian army. Two weeks after the January 2009 withdrawal, it was reported that Ethiopian troops had once again crossed the border following the fall of Baidoa to al-Shabaab. Bereket Simon, spokesman for the Ethiopian government, described the reports as fabrications and responded "The army is within the Ethiopian border. There is no intention to go back," During August 2009, a contingent of Ethiopian troops crossed into Somalia and seized the city of Beledweyne near the border.

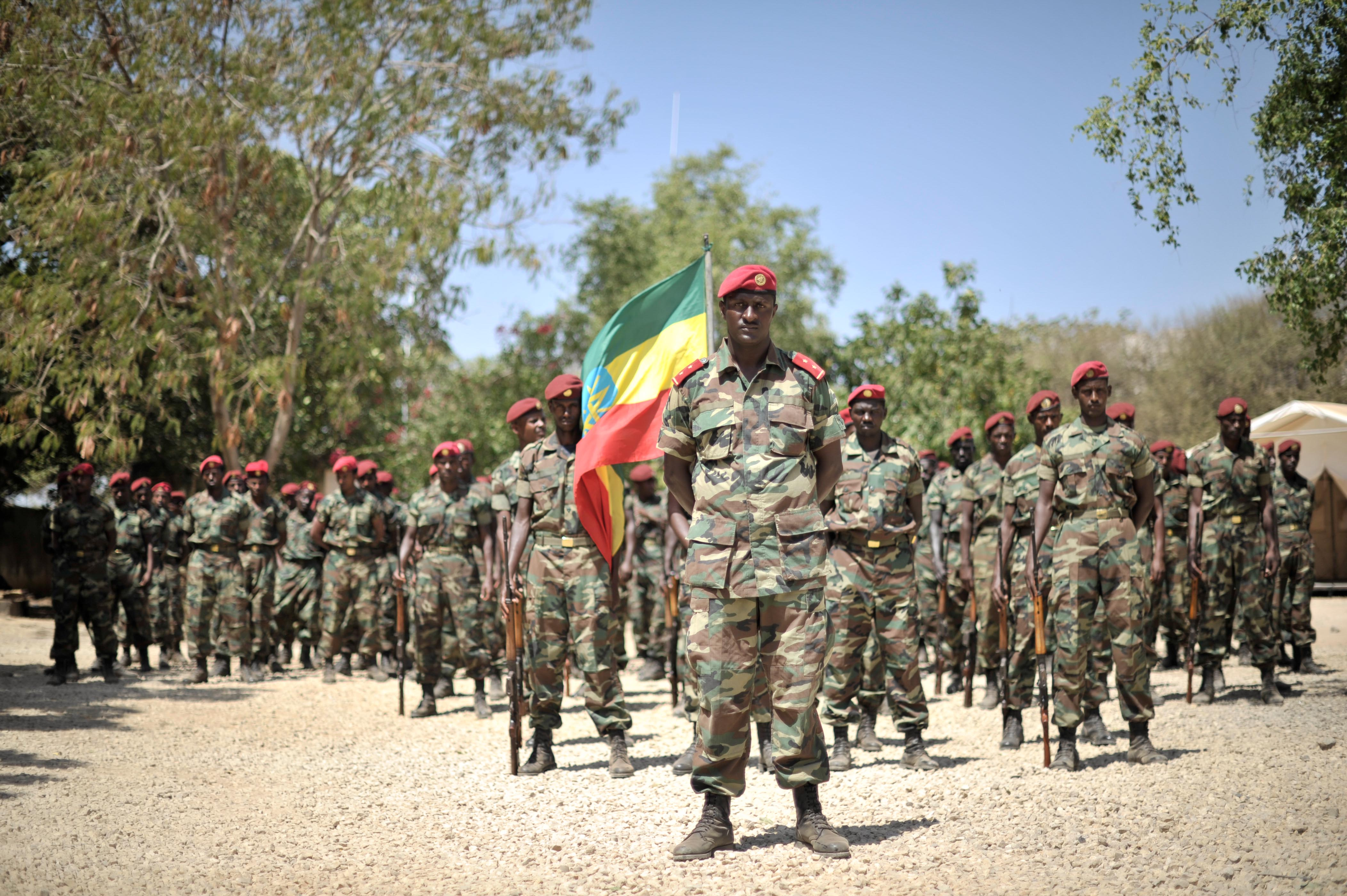
Ethiopian army ceremony in Baidoa marking the ENDF's entry into AMISOM (2014)

In late 2011, Ethiopian troops returned to parts of Somalia (coinciding with Kenya's invasion) in large numbers for the first time since the January 2009 withdrawal. In 2014 those that deployed to a buffer zone in some parts of southern Somalia were integrated into AMISOM. Many Somalis were alarmed by the decision to permit the Ethiopian to participate in the operation and analysts described the move as a "mistake" and “political and military miscalculation”. Some American officials shared these sentiments out of fear of further fueling Al-Shabaab recruitment.

Former Somali president and head of the Islamic Courts Union, Sharif Ahmed, continued to campaign for the withdrawal of the occupying Ethiopian forces into 2020. Further controversy over the deployment arose after ENDF troops in Somalia shot down a civilian aircraft carrying COVID-19 medication. During November 2020 Ethiopia withdrew thousands of troops from Somalia and redeployed them to fight the Tigray War. As the Tigray War was ongoing al-Shabaab launched a major incursion into Ethiopia during July 2022 to infiltrate the southern Bale Mountains. The current Somali President, Hassan Sheikh, accused Ethiopia of "waging a campaign of sabotage" during 2024. Ethiopian diplomats were soon expelled and in December 2024 the Federal Government of Somalia accused the Ethiopian military of "blatant aggression" after attacking Somali National Army bases in the town of Dollow, which resulted in fatalities among government forces.

== Further reading and external links ==
=== Documents ===
- So Much To Fear: War Crimes and the Devastation of Somalia (PDF). Human Rights Watch (Report). December 2008.
- Shell-Shocked Civilians Under Siege in Mogadishu (PDF). Human Rights Watch (Report). August 2007.
- Routinely targeted: Attacks on civilians in Somalia – Amnesty International (May 2008)
- "Why Am I Still Here?" The 2007 Horn of Africa Renditions and the Fate of Those Still Missing (PDF). Human Rights Watch (Report). October 2008.
- Copy of Djibouti Agreement signed between the ARS and TFG – (9 June 2008)

=== Footage ===
- Islamic Courts ready for offensive – Al Jazeera English report on ICU insurgents in southern Somalia (14 Sep 2007)
- Mohammed Abdullahi Farah Somalia Piece – Channel 4 report on insurgency in Mogadishu (10 October 2007)
- Opposition fighters gaining ground in Somalia – Al Jazeera English report on insurgent advances across the south (31 Aug 2008)
- Lindsey Hilsum Somalia Piece – Channel 4 report on fighting between Ethiopian troops and insurgents in Mogadishu (3 December 2008)
- Chaos feared in Somalia as Ethiopians pull back – Al Jazeera English report on Ethiopian military withdrawal from Somalia (15 Jan 2009)

== Bibliography ==
- Khayre, Ahmed Ali M. (21 March 2013). "Self-Defence, Intervention by Invitation, or Proxy War? The Legality of the 2006 Ethiopian Invasion of Somalia". African Journal of International and Comparative Law. 22 (2): 208–233. doi:10.3366/ajicl.2014.0090. eISSN 1755-1609. SSRN 2236622.
- Samatar, Abdi Ismail (2008). "Ethiopian Occupation and American Terror in Somalia". Post-Conflict Peace-Building in the Horn of Africa. Lund University. ISBN 978-91-7267-256-7.
- Cocodia, Jude (24 May 2021). "Rejecting African Solutions to African Problems: The African Union and the Islamic Courts Union in Somalia". African Security. 14 (2): 110–131. doi:10.1080/19392206.2021.1922026 – via Taylor & Francis.
- Mueller, Jason C. (9 May 2016). "The Evolution of Political Violence: The Case of Somalia's Al-Shabaab". Terrorism and Political Violence. 30 (1): 116–141. doi:10.1080/09546553.2016.1165213 – via Taylor & Francis.
- Civins, Braden (2010). "Ethiopia's intervention in Somalia 2006-2009" (PDF). Yonsei Journal of International Studies. 2 (2): 121–138.
- Samatar, Abdi Ismail (March 2007). "Ethiopian Invasion of Somalia, US Warlordism & AU Shame". Review of African Political Economy. 34 (111): 155–165. JSTOR 20406369.
