= Juba Valley Alliance =

- Leaders: Col. Barre Adan Shire Hiiraale; Col. Abdulahi Sheik Ismael Fara-Tag
- Dates active: June 2001 – 2008
- Group: Marehan
- Headquarters: Kismayo
- Active regions: southern Somalia
- Wars: Somali Civil War

The Juba Valley Alliance (JVA; Somali: Isbahaysiga Dooxada Jubba) is a political faction of the Somali Civil War. It was the primary opponent of the Somali Patriotic Movement (SPM) and the Somalia Reconciliation and Restoration Council (SRRC) vying for the control of Kismayo and the Juba River valley, the area known as Jubaland.

Following the breakdown of central authority in the Somali Civil War, General Hersi "Morgan" declared Jubaland independent on September 3, 1998.

Opponents to General "Morgan" came from the Somali Marehan. The Marehan Somali National Front (SNF) and other tribal allies grouped together as the Allied Somali Forces (ASF). They ousted General "Morgan" from Kismayu in June 1999.

The ASF administration renamed itself the Juba Valley Alliance in June 2001, and threw its support behind the Transitional Federal Government (TFG). The leader of the JVA is Colonel Barre Adan Shire Hiiraale, who later became Defense Minister for the TFG. The militia commander of the JVA is Col. Abdulahi Sheik Ismael Fara-Tag.

On June 18, 2001, an 11-member interclan council decided to ally the JVA with the newly establishing Transitional Federal Government.

On August 6, 2001, after 10 days of heavy fighting in a battle involving 40 technicals and 1,000 militiamen, the JVA took the town of Jilib from the SRRC.

In 2002, the JVA battled with the Somalia Reconciliation and Restoration Council (SRRC), which opposed the TFG, resulting in 6,000 refugees fleeing Bulo Hawa. In 2003, there were 15,000 internally displaced persons (IDPs) accommodated in Kismayo. Fighting throughout southern and central Somalia resulted in 86,000 IDPs by 2004. Landmines were cited as a problem affecting the area due to the fighting between the JVA and SRRC.

== War in Somalia ==
The JVA suffered the loss of Kismayo in September 2006 to an array of ICU forces with 130 technicals, and further defeat during Islamic Court Union's takeover of the Juba Valley in October 2006,

On September 23, ICU forces under Sheik Hassan Abdullah Hersi al-Turki approached Jilib, en route to Kismayo. Juba Valley Alliance forces withdrew without a fight. After the city fell, on September 24, he promised peace to the city after Islamic militiamen broke up an anti-Islamist demonstration with gunfire, killing three teenagers. On October 3, they took Afmadow. Sakow fell to the ICU on October 25–28 after they militarily defeated the Juba Valley Alliance. By December 13, Salagle also fell to them. The city of Baardhere in Gedo region, was the last sought after prize by the ICU but the population there refused them to achieve that goal. Barderians being part of the larger Juba region, the population in Gedo and Bardera in particular, disliked the ICU and its attack on Kismayo. ICU's total control of southern Somalia became impossible at this point. All sides, JVA, ICU and the powerless TGF regrouped and established new alliances and new fronts.

After the Battle of Baidoa (December 20–26), the JVA began to reassert control over the Juba Valley. On December 27, the ICU abandoned its positions in the Juba Valley at Salagle and Sakow, north of Bu'aale.

ICU forces in Kismayo were reported retreating towards Mogadishu, and TFG forces were advancing towards Bu'uale from Dinsoor, while the rest of the Lower and Middle Juba areas were calm. However, no sooner had ICU forces from Kismayo gotten to Mogadishu than they reversed direction, withdrawing back to Kismayo. After their defeat at the Battle of Jilib north of the city, the ICU forces withdrew, and on January 1, 2007, Kismayo fell to the TFG and Ethiopian forces without armed conflict.

Considering the integral part the JVA plays in the TFG's military, it could be said that the JVA has been succeeded by, or incorporated into, the army of the nascent TFG.
