= Barre Adan Shire Hiiraale =

Somali politician

Barre Adan Shire باري ادن شاير

Minister of Defense of Somalia
- In office August 2006 – 2007

Personal details
- Born: Dusamareb

Barre Adan Shire (Somali: Barre Aadan Shire, Arabic: باري ادن شاير), also known as Barre Hiiraale, Barre "Hirale" Aden Shire, or Abdikadir Adan Shire, Somali politician, former president of Jubaland state of Somalia. He is the former Minister of Defense of the Somali Transitional Federal Government (TFG). He was previously the TFG Minister for National Reconstruction and Resettlement. Hiiraale was also the chairman of the now defunct Juba Valley Alliance, which controlled Southern and Southwestern Somalia, including the nation's third-largest city, the strategic port town of Kismayo.

== Juba Valley Alliance ==
He was chairman of the Juba Valley Alliance (Isbahaysiga Dooxada Juba), which declared autonomy from the rest of Somalia in 1998, and controlled Kismayo and the Juba Valley until the defeat of his forces by the ICU in 2006.

On August 6, 2001, after 10 days of heavy fighting in a battle involving 40 technicals and 1,000 militiamen, the JVA took the town of Jilib from the SRRC.

With hopes to end the violence, Col. Hirale participated in the Somali Reconciliation Conference, held in Eldoret, Kenya, in 2002.

== Transitional Federal Government ==
Col. Hirale serves as Defense Minister in Somalia's Transitional Federal Government. In November 2005, he was instrumental in making a compromise proposal to help establish the TFG.

He suffered the loss of Kismayo in September 2006, and further defeat during ICU's takeover of the Juba Valley in October 2006. On October 14, his wife was arrested in Kismayo, along with a number of other women.

He regrouped his forces in Gedo region, and successfully lead the counterattacking TFG forces, who, alongside Ethiopian troops, won successive battles during December 2006, eventually forcing the ICU back to Mogadishu, where, on December 29, the TFG and Ethiopian forces took Mogadishu.

=== Retaking the Juba Valley ===
Fall of Mogadishu and advance on Kismayo, December 27–29, 2006

On December 29, 2006, TFG forces under Defense Minister (and former head of the Juba Valley Alliance) Barre Adan Shire Hiiraale entered Bu'aale, approximately 150 km north of Kismayo. Ethiopian jets continued to patrol over Jilib, and a column of 15 tanks was reported heading towards Bu'aale and Jilib. The Islamic militia reportedly mined the road to Jilib.

=== Battle of Jilib ===

On December 31, 2006, the Battle of Jilib determined the control of the approaches to Kismayo. The result of the battle was the retaking of Kismayo on January 1, 2007, which was abandoned by ICU forces.

=== Pardon Offered to Islamists ===
On January 2, 2007, in Kismayo, Col. Hiiraale offered an amnesty to former members of the ICU forces. He also spoke about the strength of the new government: "You have heard a lot of times that the transitional government is weak... But I will confirm [to] you that the national army are in control of all regions in the country - east, centre and south."
