= Andrew Mwangura =

Andrew Mwangura is a negotiator between pirates and ship owners off the coast of Africa. He directs the Seafarers' Assistance Programme.

Samuel L. Jackson's Uppity Films along with H_{2}O Motion Pictures are in talks with Mwangura to secure the rights to his life story.
