= Abdirashid Mohamed Hidig =

Somalian politician

State Minister for Interior of Somalia
- Incumbent
- Assumed office 6 February 2015
- Prime Minister: Omar Abdirashid Ali Sharmarke

Personal details
- Born: Somalia
- Party: Independent

Abdirashid Mohamed Hidig (or Hiddig, Somali: Cabdirashiid Maxamed Xidig, Arabic: عبد الرشيد محمد حديق) is a Somali politician.

== Career ==
He was appointed as one of the 275 Members of Parliament in the Transitional Federal Parliament of Somalia on August 29, 2004, to serve a term until 2009.

On January 9, 2007, he prematurely claimed the town of Ras Kamboni had been taken by the army of the Transitional Federal Government (TFG). On January 10, he returned to Kismayo after touring to the front of the Battle of Ras Kamboni and spoke of 50 killed in the attacks. He said additional targets hit include Hayo, Garer, Bankajirow, and Badmadowe. Other sources denied the additional attacks were made by the US. Ethiopian aircraft are also known to be operating in the combat area.

On 1 April 2011 Abdirashid Mohamed Hidig was nominated Deputy Defense Minister of the TFG of Somalia.

He was appointed as the State Minister for Interior of Somalia on 6 February 2015 by Prime Minister Omar Abdirashid Ali Sharmarke.

In February 2022 he retained his seat as an MP of the Jubaland Parliament, where he is one of the leaders of the Opposition.
