= Battle of Jilib =

Battle in the 2006 Somali War

- Part of the Ethiopian invasion of Somalia (2006–2009)
- (click to expand)
Date	31 December 2006 – 1 January 2007
Location	Near Jilib, Somalia
Result	Ethiopian/TFG victory

Belligerents
(Ethiopia) ENDF (Somalia) TFG	ICU

Commanders and leaders
(Ethiopia) Gabre Heard (Somalia) Barre Adan Shire Hiiraale	Sharif Sheik Ahmed; Yusuf Hassan

Strength
6,000+ ENDF/TFG forces 16 ENDF tanks along with APCs, artillery, MiG fighter-bombers	3,000 ICU fighters 60 technicals

The Battle of Jilib took place on the last day of 2006 during the Ethiopian invasion of Somalia. It was fought when Ethiopian National Defence Force (ENDF) troops and Transitional Federal Government (TFG) militia launched an offensive on the town of Jilib, held by the Islamic Courts Union (ICU).

Following the ICU's withdrawal from Mogadishu, they regrouped in Jilib, Middle Juba and the port city of Kismayo, Lower Jubba. The battle for the town began on 31 December 2006, when ICU forces entrenched around the town attempted defend it in order to delay the advance on Kismayo, one of the last major strongholds of the Islamic Courts. After a day of fighting the town was overrun and the ICU retreated to Kismayo.

== Background ==
After the Fall of Mogadishu, roughly 3,000 ICU fighters were said to have fled towards the port city of Kismayo, their last remaining stronghold, 300 miles (500 km) to the south. In Kismayo, executive leader of the ICU, Sheikh Sharif Sheikh Ahmed was defiant, "We will not run away from our enemies. We will never depart from Somalia. We will stay in our homeland."

=== Forces involved ===
At Jilib, the ICU prepared trenches and defensive positions. They had about 3,000 fighters and 60 technicals mounted with antiaircraft and antitank guns.

ENDF/TFG forces outnumbered the ICU forces at Jilib, "...by more than two to one" according to TFG deputy defence minister Salad Ali Jelle. ENDF/TFG troops with 16 tanks, backed by armoured vehicles and artillery were seen advancing on the town. US military forces were reported to be operating in the region at the time.

== Battle ==
Two thirds of Jilib's population fled before the battle. On Saturday, 30 December, joint Ethiopian-TFG troops had reached the town of Jilib, the last major town on the road to Kismayo. Sheikh Ahmed urged the ICU soldiers to fight on.

On Sunday, 31 December, fighting began in the thick mango forests near Helashid, 11 miles (18 km) to the northwest of Jilib. Ethiopian MiG fighters, tanks, artillery and mortars struck Islamic positions in the assault. Residents reported the road to Jilib was littered with remote-controlled landmines placed by the ICU. TFG and Ethiopian forces also attacked Bulobaley, with mortars and rockets.

At approximately 5:00 p.m., a heavy gun battle erupted on the outskirts of Jilib town between Islamic fighters and the Ethiopian-backed interim government troops. Tanks and armored vehicles were reported committed by Ethiopian forces. The sound of heavy artillery fire could be heard in Jamame town near Jilib, local residents said.

Islamist commander Sheikh Yusuf Hassan said "The fighting has started. There are heavy losses on both sides", and added that they "are not going to surrender. We will fight to defend Jilib and Kismayo until we die."

Somali Minister of Foreign Affairs Ismail Mohammed Hurreh Buba declared fighting was going well for the government, and the battles around Kismayo might take another two days. He asked for Somalia's coast to be watched for dhows, small boats which might try to rescue or reinforce the Islamists. A spokesman said that the United States Fifth Fleet's maritime task force based out of Djibouti was patrolling the Somali coast to prevent ICU fighters from launching an "attack or to transport personnel, weapons or other material".

During the night, artillery strikes continued, eventually forcing the ICU frontlines to falter. A mutiny within the ICU caused their forces to disintegrate, and abandon both Jilib and Kismayo. At 10 p.m., the sounds of battle died down. By midnight, the ICU front in Jilib had collapsed, and the ICU began to flee. By 2:00 a.m., they had fled from Kismayo. Local militiamen patrolled the streets, and looting began of former ICU property. They were reported to be fleeing towards Ras Kamboni island in southern Somalia, or the Kenyan border.

A map of the situation in Somalia in 2007.

As a result, the transitional government requested that Kenya seal its border with Somalia. According to the BBC, Kenyan armored vehicles appeared heading toward the border, though the government made no formal statements.

== Aftermath ==
With the ICU in a retreat for the Kenyan border, Transitional Federal Government forces slowly advanced towards Kismayo to avoid the many landmines that had been placed. By 1 January 2007, they had reached Kismayo, which was taken without a fight.

Thereafter, operations moved towards securing the borders with Kenya in the provinces of Afmadow and Badhadhe in the Lower Juba region. Ethiopian aircraft and attack helicopters struck the town of Doble (Dhobley) in Afmadow province, not far from the Kenyan border. The strikes were presumably to hit ICU elements attempting to cross the border. Fighting tailed off after midnight.

On 4 January, reports said ICU troops were split across Afmadow and Badade districts, and possibly concentrated at the former Al-Ittihad Al-Islamiya (AIAI) stronghold of Ras Kamboni. TFG and Ethiopian forces reported taking district capital Afmadow (2 January), and Dhobley along the Kenyan border (3 January), and were presently en route to Badade, the district capital just north of Ras Kamboni.
