= Fall of Kismayo =

- Part of the War in Somalia (2006–2009)
Date	January 1, 2007
Location	Kismayo, Somalia
Result	Ethiopian/TFG victory: Government forces take control of Kismayo

Belligerents
Ethiopia; TFG	Islamic Courts Union

Commanders and leaders
Gabre Heard	Sharif Sheik Ahmed

The fall of Kismayo occurred on January 1, 2007, Ethiopian military forces backing the Transitional Federal Government entered the Somali city of Kismayo unopposed. It came after the Islamic Courts Union's forces faltered and fled in the Battle of Jilib.

== Background ==
The city of Kismayo had been the capital of the autonomous state of Jubaland under the administration of the Juba Valley Alliance (JVA) since the late 1990s. The JVA suffered the loss of Kismayo in September 2006 to an array of ICU forces with 130 technicals.

== Course of events ==
In December 2006, after the Fall of Mogadishu, much of the Islamists began a retreat towards Kismayo. According to the New York Times, when the Battle of Jilib began on December 31, 2006, clan elders within Kismayo demanded the ICU leave the city. Mohammed Arab, a clan leader said "We told them that they were going to lose, and that our city would get destroyed." After the ICU refused, sporadic gun battles broke out between the local clans and the ICU.

The Battle of Jilib saw the ICU frontlines collapse during the night to artillery fire, causing the ICU hardliners, known as Al-Shabaab (literally "The Youths" or "Young Men"), to once again go into retreat, this time towards the Kenyan border. TFG and Ethiopian forces entered the town on January 1, 2007.

With the Kenyan border blocked, the ICU remnants were described as holding up in Badhadhe district, either in the hills of the Buur Gaabo area, or in the village of Ras Kamboni along the coast near the border.

== Aftermath ==
In August 2008, Al Shabaab retook the city during the Battle of Kismayo (2008).

In September 2012, the Somali National Army assisted by AMISOM troops and Raskamboni militia re-captured Kismayo from the insurgents in the Battle of Kismayo (2012).
