= Seafarers' Assistance Programme =

The East African Seafarers' Assistance Programme (SAP) is an independent organization for the welfare of seafarers and a piracy-monitoring group. The organisation was founded in 1996 to assist captured and other seafarers in need and to track, report the actions and effects of pirates off the coast of Africa, specifically, in the Indian Ocean off the coast of Somalia and Kenya where piracy has traditionally been a major problem. The current head of the group is Andrew Mwangura.

== See also ==
- International Maritime Bureau
