= Abdirahman Janaqow =

Somali leader

Abdirahman Mahmud Farah
- Janaqow in a speech in Norway.

21st Minister of Justice of Somalia
- In office 2009–2010
- President: Sharif Sheikh Ahmed
- Preceded by: Hassan Dimbil Warsame
- Succeeded by: Salim Aliyow Ibrow

Deputy Chairman of Islamic Courts Union Executive Council
- In office 26 June 2006 – 27 December 2006
- Chairman: Sharif Sheikh Ahmed
- Preceded by: Position established

Military service
- Allegiance: Islamic Courts Union

Abdirahman Mahmud Farah Janaqow (Somali: Cabdiraxmaan Maxamuud Faarax Janaqoow) is a Somali leader, and he was deputy chairman, and a member of the Islamic Courts Union of Somalia (ICU). He and other leaders signed a capitulation of Mogadishu on 27 December 2006 after military losses. However they continued military resistance to the south. Janaqaw was falsely reported to have been killed in a U.S. airstrike on 8 January 2007 in the Battle of Ras Kamboni. He is a member of the Murusade clan. He later served as the Minister of Justice for the Somali government.

== Islamic Courts Union ==
Janaqow appeared as deputy of executive chairman for the ICU in the summer of 2006. On December 27, 2006 he evacuated Mogadishu and fled south, saying "We decided to leave Mogadishu because of the safety of the civilians. We want to face our enemy and their stooges in a separate area, away from civilians."
