= Gabre Heard =

Ethiopian general

Gabre Heard or Gebre Heard, (né Gebregziabher Alemseged Abraha, nom de guerre "Butcher of Mogadishu"), is a former Colonel in the Ethiopian National Defense Force, top party official of the Tigray People's Liberation Front, and the supreme commander of Ethiopian military forces in Somalia. He was in charge of military operations during the Ethiopian invasion and occupation of Somalia from 2006 to 2008, until his recall to Ethiopia following backlash from the Somali population for war crimes committed by forces under his command. He was later accused of being responsible for war crimes in the Somali Region of Ethiopia. During the Tigray War, the Ethiopian government accused Gabre of treason and issued a warrant for his arrest.

Gabre headed Ethiopian military operations for a significant part of the Ethiopian invasion and occupation of Somalia from 2006 to 2009. Though he is often referred to as 'General Gabre', he held the ENDF rank as Colonel. He came to be a powerful figure in Somali politics, reportedly employing spies throughout numerous Somali government institutions, including the National Intelligence and Security Agency. He has been criticized for the Ethiopian military's indiscriminate use of heavy weapons in civilian areas, and the use of these weapons in retribution attacks on areas where insurgent forces are suspected to be operating, following attacks on Ethiopian forces. Many of Gabre Heard's critics have given him the nom de guerre "Butcher of Mogadishu." On 12 August 2008, General Gabre and an unnamed colonel were relieved of command and recalled to Ethiopia, in part for his failure to maintain order in Somalia, but also due to suspected killing and displacement of thousands of Somali civilians by his forces, and rumors of being involved in various financial scandals, which including blackmailing the Somali president, prime minister and various Somali businessmen.

During the tenure of President Farmaajo in 2017, the Somali government formally requested the Ethiopian government remove Gabre from being in charge of Ethiopian affairs of Somalia. In 2018, Gabre was arrested by Ethiopian police to face charges for war crimes in the Somali Region (aka Ogaden). The year he was also dismissed from the IGAD after complaints from Somali leaders about political interference. At the start of the Tigray War during November 2020, the Ethiopian government accused Gabre of treason and issued a warrant for his arrest.
