= Battle of Mogadishu =

Battle of Mogadishu may refer to:

- Battle of Mogadishu (1993), also known as the Black Hawk Down incident, a battle in which United States, Pakistani, and Malaysian forces fought forces of Somali warlord Mohamed Farrah Aidid
- Battle of Mogadishu (2006), a battle in which the Islamic Courts Union attacked the ARPCT
- Battle of Mogadishu (March–April 2007), a battle in which the Transitional Federal Government and Ethiopian Army battled the insurgents of the Islamist PRM and the Hawiye clan
- Battle of Mogadishu (November 2007), a battle between the TFG/Ethiopia and the Islamist PRM
- Battle of Mogadishu (2008), a battle between the TFG/Ethiopia and the Islamist PRM
- Battle of Mogadishu (2009), a stand-off between al-Shabaab and Hizbul Islam rebels and the TFG-ARS Alliance
- Battle of Mogadishu (2010–2011), a battle between al-Shabaab and the ICU/TFG Alliance

== See also ==
- Mogadishu bombings (disambiguation)
- Battle of Checkpoint Pasta, a 1993 battle between Italian forces and Somali warlord Mohamed Farrah Aidid in Mogadishu near an abandoned Barilla pasta factory
- 2021 Mogadishu mutiny
- Battle of South Mogadishu, an armed clash between the TFG and Hizbul Islam in February 2009
- Fall of Mogadishu, a 2006 battle in which the Transitional Federal Government and Ethiopian Army attacked the Islamic Courts Union
