= Battle of Mogadishu (2010–2011) =

Battle of the Somali Civil War

Battle of Mogadishu (2010–11)
- Part of Somali Civil War (2009–present)
- Map of the government counteroffensive to expel Al-Shabaab from Mogadishu from 2011 to 2012
Date	23 August 2010 – 20 October 2011
Location	Mogadishu, Somalia
Result	TFG and AMISOM victory: Majority of Mogadishu under TFG and AMISOM control as of 6 August 2011.; Whole city cleared of al-Shabaab by 20 October; Continued al-Shabaab guerilla attacks after withdrawal

Belligerents
Harakat al-Shabaab Mujahideen; Hizbul Islam Alleged: al-Qaeda	Transitional Federal Republic of Somalia; ARS-D-TFG coalition AMISOM Ahlu Sunna Waljama'a Limited involvement: United States; European Union

Commanders and leaders
Mukhtar Abu Zubeyr; Mukhtar Robow; Hussein Ali Fidow; Ali Mohamed Hussein; Ibrahim "al-Afghani"; Sheikh Ali Dhere; Omar Shafik Hammami; Hassan Dahir Aweys; Mohamed Hayle; Fuad Mohamed Qalaf; Rajah Abu Khalid; Fazul Abdullah †	(Somalia) Sharif Ahmed (Somalia) Abdihakim Mohamoud Haji-Faqi (Somalia) Hussein Arab Isse (Somalia) Abdikarim Yusuf Adam; Omar Sheikh Muhammad Farah; Omar Mo'allim Nur (Uganda) Fredrick Mugisha (Uganda) Nathan Mugisha (Uganda) Paul Lokech (Uganda) Mikael Ondoga (Burundi) Cyprien Hakiza

Strength
Al-Shabaab: 5,000 – 14,426	TFG: 5,000; AMISOM: 9,300+ ASWJ: 2,000+

Casualties and losses
1,000–1,300 killed 2,000 wounded	Total: 641+ KIA: (Somalia) 516+ KIA, 239+ WIA; Amisom 118 KIA, 66+ WIA; 7 KIA, 18 WIA
- 2,318+ civilians killed – 6,024+ wounded (January – November 2010)
- Hizbul Islam was disbanded and merged into al-Shabaab on 20 December 2010.

The Battle of Mogadishu (2010–11) began on 23 August 2010 when al-Shabaab insurgents began attacking government and African Union Mission to Somalia (AMISOM) positions in the Somali capital of Mogadishu. Al-Shabaab began its offensive after its spokesman said the group was declaring a "massive war" on troops sent by AMISOM, describing its 6,000 peacekeepers as "invaders". In December 2010 the number of AMISOM troops was increased to 8,000 and later to 9,000. The battle's name usually includes the years, when referenced, in order to distinguish it amongst the nine major Battles of Mogadishu during the decades long Somali Civil War.

== Background ==
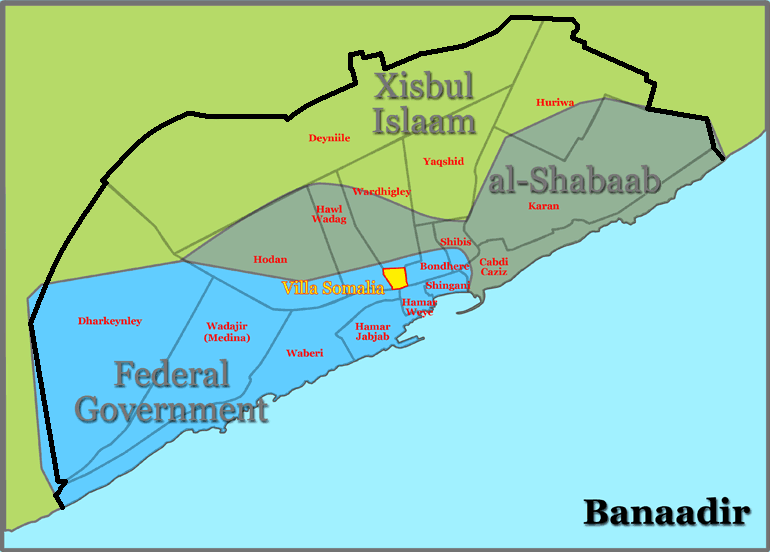
Mogadishu prior to the battle

Al-Shabaab had previously declared a "massive" war against the internationally backed Transitional Federal Government and AMISOM troop "invaders." On 11 July 2010 they attacked Kampala, Uganda in revenge for the country's support of African Union troops in Somalia.

The attacks took place as hundreds of additional Ugandan troops arrived in the country.

== Fighting ==
=== 2010 ===
==== August: Ramadan Offensive ====
Forty people were reportedly killed and more than one hundred injured in the violence that began on 23 August. After that, fighting continued and the next day, when several al-Shabaab militants, disguised as government workers, launched an attack on the Muna Hotel, a hotel known for hosting many Somali government officials and politicians, the hotel was located a kilometre away from the presidential palace Villa Somalia. Thirty one people were reported killed in the hotel incident, including eleven lawmakers.

By 26 August, one-hundred fifteen people had been killed and two hundred had been wounded and hundreds of people were reported to have fled the city. Both sides claimed advances with Mujahideen fighters making new bases in the areas they had captured; however, a police spokesman denied al-Shabaab claims that government troops were losing territory in the city. The next day, al-Shabaab said it had called eleven truckloads of reinforcements to take over the capital Mogadishu after a week-long battle. The government again, however, continued to deny claims that al-Shabaab was gaining any ground.

On 30 August, fighting was renewed when al-Shabaab fighters attempted to take a government barracks around Sigale in the capital's Hodan neighbourhood. The ensuring action left six confirmed dead and sixteen wounded and by the end of the month UPI reported that a mortar attack by al-Shabaab killed four Ugandan peacekeepers guarding the presidential palace in Mogadishu. A TFG spokesman. Barigye Ba-Hoku denied claims though by al-Shabaab that the group was close to capturing a road connecting the Palace to the Airport.

==== September ====
The first week of September started with at least nineteen people being killed in fresh fighting between Somali government forces and al-Shabaab. Almost 14,000 of the displaced people left Mogadishu by the fifth entirely as fighting continued, and by weeks end three more Somalis were killed and twenty-three wounded as five hundred shells pounded northern and southern parts of the capital. On 9 September al-Shabaab attacked Mogadishu's airport when a bomb exploded outside. A second vehicle full of militants then opened fire on the peacekeepers and Somali security forces, which left at least eight people killed (two of whom were peacekeeping force soldiers).

On 16 September at least eighteen civilians were killed in fighting between al-Shabaab and the government forces near the Bakaara Market. Fighting continued into 20 September with at least 10 more civilian casualties. On 20 September, Islamic militants seized two radio stations in the capital, and a suicide bomber blew herself up at the gates of the presidential palace in Mogadishu, slightly injuring two soldiers.

Al-Shabaab launched a new offensive against government forces and AMISOM on 22 September. Nineteen civilians and twenty-four Islamists were killed, one soldier member of AMISOM was killed and two others wounded as a result. On 27 September al-Shabaab militants attacked the National Parliament building with mortars while a lawmakers' meeting was assembled. Government soldiers and African Union forces repelled the attack, however.

==== October ====
Between 5–6 October, at least fifteen people were killed and twenty-two others wounded in fighting in Mogadishu between insurgent forces and AMISOM. Most of the dead were civilians. However, on 7 October it was reported that AU troops had captured more territory and were expected to control half of the city by the end of the month. By 11–12 October, fifteen more people were killed in clashes as fighting continued. Organized by the city's local government on 24 October, hundreds of people rallied in the Somali government controlled part of Mogadishu to protest against the Islamist insurgency and call for peaceful resolution. By the end of the month, officials in Mogadishu claimed that they had the upper hand in six of the capital's 16 districts, but battling continued. Outside the capital, Ahlu Sunna wal Jamaa also made additional progress chasing al-Shabaab out of a few towns in the recent weeks. Al-Shabaab was reported to be continuing its terror tactics and smart guerrilla tactics.

==== November ====
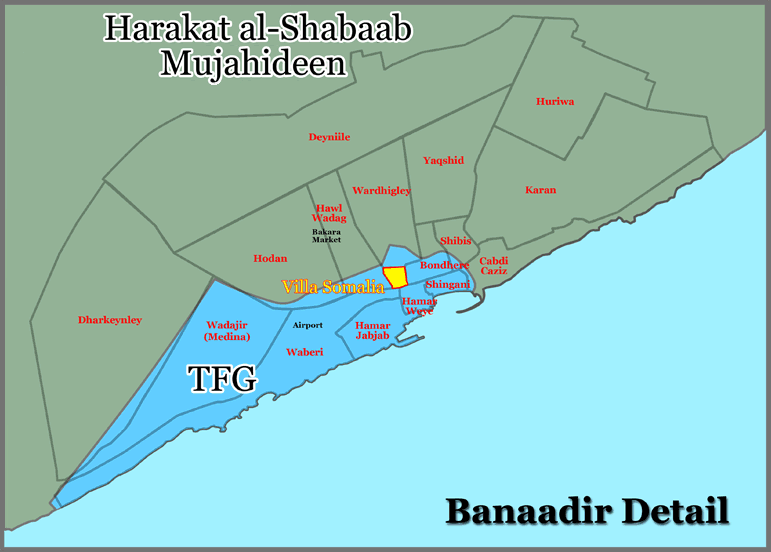
Mogadishu 26 November 2010

On 1 November, at least twelve people were killed in a battle between government forces and Islamist militants. Three government soldiers were killed, with six wounded. Witnesses claim civilians were also killed during the battle.

The next day, Somalia's new prime minister Mohamed Abdullahi Mohamed was sworn in as twenty-one more people were killed and thirty wounded, as allied TFG and African Union forces battled al-Shabaab insurgents. Mohamed was quoted as saying "I will uphold and protect the laws of the country and I will pursue the common interest of the people and the nation.".

By 11 November, twelve more people were killed and twenty-five others injured after an attack in Mogadishu's northern district of Boondheere and 18 November saw twenty-one more civilians killed from artillery shelling.

On 28 November, the president of Uganda Yoweri Museveni visited Mogadishu and urged the international community to provide more support for the government of Somalia. However, the next day at least fifteen people died and twenty-five injured after Islamist fighters attacked government positions in the northern part of the city.

==== December ====
The month began with more AMISOM troops being deployed on 2 December as more attacks continued, mostly in the northern part of the city. On 5 December, at least twelve more people and twenty others were wounded as a result of heavy artillery exchange in one of the city's northern districts. Fifteen additional people were killed between 10 and 11 December and on 15 December heavy fighting was reported as al-Shabaab tried to cut off Maka-Almukarama which is the only street in Mogadishu that the Somali government officials and the African Union troops use for their especial purposes.

On 20 December 2010, Hizbul Islam officially surrendered to al-Shabaab and the two organisations merged. As a result, al-Shabaab fighters started taking over Hizbul Islam positions, while Hizbul Islam fighters were allowed to enter al-Shabaab-controlled territories as well. On 23 December, the two sides formally declared unity in Mogadishu with a ceremony held in the Nasrudin mosque, which was attended by al-Shabaab's official spokesman Sheik Ali Mohamud Raghe and Sheik Abdifatah Mo'allin Mohamed, Hizbul Islam's head of information.

New fighting broke out on 25 December, killing at least two and injuring at least 25; the fighting happened as al-Shabaab declared it would increase its attacks after its merger with Hizbul Islam. Twenty-five more people were killed and thirty-two civilians were wounded in the fighting on 30 December.

=== 2011 ===
==== January ====
The new year opened up with a violent mutiny staged by government forces which resulted in three soldiers being killed and seven wounded over nonpayment of salaries. Nineteen people were also killed in clashes on 1 January as insurgents attacked bases of Somali government forces.

==== February – March: anti-insurgency offensive ====
On 19 February, AMISOM forces clashed with al-Shabaab in the Sigaale and El Hindi areas of Hawl Wadag district. The battle lasted for two days and reached a death toll of more than 20 people, including several foreign al-Shabaab fighters. The next day it was reported that AMISOM troops destroyed a large complex of al-Shabaab trenches, and killed six al-Shabaab commanders in Mogadishu. Two AMISOM troops were KIA.

AMISOM and TFG forces then advanced northwest into the Hodan district of Mogadishu. As a result, on 23 February, several strategic places were captured. This includes the former Defense Ministry that al-Shabaab used as a base and where they launched the attacks from during the Ramadan Offensive. Warshadda Aanaha (former Milk Factory) and sections of Industrial Road were also captured. At least 86 Somali soldiers, 8 AU soldiers, 70 al-Shabaab fighters and 45 civilians were killed during the battles.

A major explosion occurred on 21 February when a suicide car bomb detonated at a police post in the Hamar jajab district of Mogadishu. At least 20 people were killed, including TFG policemen and a woman.

During 25 February, AMISOM and TFG forces took over Mogadishu junction Florence (Hararyale), Ged Je'el in the street of Wadnaha and advanced to around 500 meters from Bakaara Market. Another trench system used by al-Shabaab was discovered and destroyed. In February, over 50 AMISOM soldiers were killed by the insurgents.

As the offensive continued, it was reported on 5 March that up to 53 AMISOM members may have died in the clashes. Of those, 43 Burundian and 10 Ugandan.

Burundi announced on 12 March that they had deployed 1,000 extra soldiers to AMISOM over a two-day period, bringing the total Burundi contribution up to 4,400 soldiers.

On 16 March, Abdikadir Yusuf Aar a.k.a. Sheikh Qalbi, a senior al-Shabaab official serving as the group's leader in the Juba and Gedo regions was killed in Mogadishu.

==== May – June: Bakaara market offensive ====
Bakaara market has for several years been one of the main strongholds and sources of income (together with the port in Kismayo) for al-Shabaab. The market has been used for launching attacks and for shooting mortars towards AMISOM and TFG-controlled areas of Mogadishu. It has been hard to target al-Shabaab hiding within the market, as it is the largest in Somalia and packed with civilians.

On 12 May TFG, AMISOM and Ahlu Sunna Waljama'a launched an offensive towards Bakaara market. The goal of the offensive was to take control of Bakaara market located in the Hawl Wadag district of Mogadishu. It was part of a major offensive going on in several places in Somalia to take back those areas under al-Shabaab control.

Two days into the battle, on 14 May, the al-Shabaab commander of Bakaara market, Abdifatah Mahamed, was killed together with his intelligence officer Abdiwahab Sheik Dole.

On 15 May, heavy fighting occurred, causing more than 35 deaths, including al-Shabaab commander of Hawlwadag district Ali Burhan "Ayatuulah".

After four days of fighting TFG, AMISOM and Ahlu Sunna Waljama'a forces had advanced around 500 meters towards the market. The front line was on 16 May around 500–700 meters north and west of the market and 200 meters south of it. The areas seized from al-Shabaab included a former Sufi shrine that al-Shabaab used as a military base. In an attack on 16, 6 May Ahlu Sunna Waljama'a soldiers were killed in a mortar attack and 17 injured.

Heavy shelling hit the Bakaara Market on 14 May, resulting in at least 14 civilian deaths. Most of the civilians killed were women doing their shopping; as well as one child. Shelling continued on 20 May and in Saraha Boliska in the Wadajir district, 3 people were killed in another shelling incident and 6 were injured. Mortars also hit the Bulahubey neighborhood, injuring two people.

A major breakthrough happened on 22 May when most of the marked roads, including the Wadnaha road (National road), fell into the hands of TFG and AMISOM. During the fighting, 2 civilians, 4 AMISOM soldiers and 22 al-Shabaab fighters were killed. Al-Shabaab lost one of their top leaders in Mogadishu. Before being killed, Abu Hubeyda was coordinating the al-Shabaab attacks from Bakaara market. As the AMISOM and TFG forces advanced, they captured the famous Red Mosque on 23 May.

In an attempt on 25 May to open a second front and relieve some of the pressure from Bakaara market, around 300 al-Shabaab fighters attacked AMISOM and TFG bases in Bondere, Shingani and Scibis. At least five al-Shabaab fighters were killed. Fighting continued the next night and at least one person was killed. Due to the tense situation in Bakaara market, merchants started to evacuate the market. Some of the shop-keepers re-opened in TFG-controlled parts of Mogadishu.

During the offensive, several key places were captured by AMISOM and TFG. They include the Red mosque, Wadnaha road (National road), Sheikh Ali Suffi mosque, African Village and "Tarabunka" (old parade ground).

Around 15 vehicles carrying foreign al-Shabaab fighters (of African origin and one truck of Pakistani and Yemenite) left Abdul Aziz district in Mogadishu heading to Afgoye on 30 May. At the same time, al-Shabaab deployed fighters from Lower Shabelle and Bay region to the front line in Bakaara market in an attempt to put a halt to the offensive made by AMISOM and TFG.

At 16:45 hours, al-Shabaab insurgents disguised as SNA (Somali Army) soldiers driving a white mini-van opened fire at AMISOM and Ahlu Sunna Waljama'a fighters at the "Dabka" base. The insurgence objective was the Ugandan AMISOM soldiers stationed in Maka Al-Mukarama. Due to a mistake, the insurgents attacked the building next to the one holding AMISOM soldiers, containing Ahlu Sunna Waljama'a fighters. The area was heavily guarded and three of the al-Shabaab insurgents were killed in the firefight while two exploded (suicide bombers), killing several civilians on the Maka Al-Mukarama road. Then the 3 extant insurgents ran towards the Liberian village, where SNA soldiers were stationed. Two AMISOM soldiers and 6 insurgents were killed in the emerging fight, while three AMISOM soldiers and 6 Ahlu Sunna Waljama'a fighters were injured. One of the al-Shabaab suicide bombers killed during the attack was Abdullahi Ahmed, a Somali/American from Minneapolis, USA.

Al-Shabaab launched hit-and-run attacks on AMISOM and SNA bases at Warshadaha Street in the early morning of 2 June. At least two people were killed and three injured in the erupting battle. Around 17 civilians were killed and 46 injured in the fighting that continued at Wadnaha Road, former Ministry of Defense and Hodan district. Most of the casualties occurred when artillery fire hit a bus station. AMISOM and SNA continued their advance and penetrated deep into al-Shabaab trenches. The result of the fighting was that AMISOM (Burundi troops) and SNA gained full control over Taranbunka road, which leads from km 4 to the Industrial road as well as over the western access to Bakaara market.

Friday, 3 June was a calm day in Mogadishu. AMISOM troops moved out of some of its key bases in the city, and moved forward to the newly established bases closer to Bakara market in African Village and on Wadnaha road (National road). The Somali Police Force was tasked with the security in the rear areas where AMISOM pulled out. After using Friday to prepare, AMISOM and SNA attacked al-Shabaab in the northeastern parts of Mogadishu on Saturday. AMISOM were advancing with tanks towards al-Shabaab positions. The whole district of Bondere (including the former embassies of Italy and Syria), Siinay Village in Wardhigley district and Afarta Jardiino in Yaqshid district and Damanyo military camp (Shirkole Ofshiale) were captured by AMISOM and SNA. At least 15 people were killed (including 1 Ugandan soldier) and 30 injured. It is believed that the majority of the injured were civilians.

The commander of the Ugandan 23rd Battalion, Lieutenant Colonel Patrick Tibihwa and 3 other Ugandan soldiers were killed on Saturday, 4 June. The Lieutenant Colonel is the highest ranking Ugandan officer killed in Somalia. He was killed by a stray bullet in Bondere district of Mogadishu. The 3 others were hit by mortars in the same district.

Fighting continued on Sunday 5 June. Suqa Holaha, Jungal, Siisii and Fagah neighborhoods were hit by several artillery shells. 8 civilians were killed and 15 injured.

The Somali Police Force took over the security of Km 4, Guriga Shaqalaha, Isgoyska Dabka and Makka Almukara roads on 6 June. This happened after AMISOM and SNA moved their forces to the front line in Mogadishu. Mortars hit the neighborhoods near the sea resort in Karan district. Around 10 civilian people were killed and residents started to evacuate the district in fear of more shelling.

Two civilians were killed and 1 injured on 7 June, when al-Shabaab insurgence opened fire at khat traders in Almada area of Mogadishu.

The head of VIP section at Aden Adde International Airport Omar Abdulle Mohamed a.k.a. Omar Qaldaan was assassinated on 8 June. When he left a mosque in Dharkeynley district of Mogadishu a man dressed in the uniform of SNA approached him. When he noticed the man he then tried to escape but was shot in the head and died instantly. Since being appointed head of VIP section at Aden Adde International Airport earlier this year he had received several death threats. al-Shabaab is the prime suspect after the Assassination.

The top al-Shabaab commander Fazul Abdullah Mohammed and a Kenyan extremist Musa Hussein (a.k.a. Musa Sambayo), were driving in a car carrying $40,000 in United States Dollars, as well as medicine, telephones, laptops and a South African passport in the Afgooye corridor, northwest of Mogadishu on 8 June 2011. Musa Hussein was known to Mohammed as Abdullahi Dere and is believed to have been involved in funding operations for al-Shabaab. They had been driving from Jubbada Hoose with destination Mogadishu. There they were to meet another al-Shabaab commander. As the front line was changing daily in Mogadishu they took a wrong turn or got lost resulting in they entered Sarkuusta area in the outskirt of Mogadishu that TFG/AMISOM controlled. At 2:00 am they stopped at a security checkpoint managed by the Somali military (SNA). The SNA opened fire on the car when they were attacked, killing both Fazul Abdullah Mohammed and his accomplice.

A suicide attack occurred at the Mogadishu port on 9 June. 2 al-Shabaab insurgence passed a check point at the port blended with other traders. Then they climbed over the fence and proceeded to the AMISOM base at the 4th store in the port. There they opened fire. One of the insurgence were shot and killed before being able to detonate the charge. The second insurgence detonated and killed 1 civilian. 3 AMISOM soldiers were injured in the attack. One of the suicide bombers was later identified as 27 years old Farah Mohamed Beledi from Minnesota, USA.

On 10 June, the Interior Minister Abdi Shakur Sheikh Hassan was killed by a bomb at his home in Soobe near Km 4 in Mogadishu. Somali Police Force claim he was killed when his niece from abroad, Haboon Abdulkadir Hersi Qaaf, acted as a suicide bomber. She was found dead at the scene, while the minister was taken to Banadir Hospital where he later was pronounced dead from the injuries sustained from the bomb. al-Shabaab however claimed responsibility for the attack and claim the bomb that detonated was planted under the ministers bed in his home.

In the beginning of June there was a political crises between President Sheikh Sharif Sheikh Ahmed and the Speaker of Parliament Sharif Hassan Sheikh Aden with ended with the "Kampala accord" on 9 June. During this time the offensive seem to have halted as the market has been besieged from three sides. AMISOM announced that taking complete control over Bakaara market could take as long as until October 2011.

===== Casualties during the Bakara offensive =====
	AMISOM	SNA	ASWJ	al-Shabaab	Civilian
Killed	12	20	6	39	79
Wounded	13		23		81

(12 May – 11 June)

==== July ====
On 1 July AMISOM confirmed that another 3,000 soldiers from UPDF had arrived in Mogadishu.

SNA and AMISOM attacked Bangaria village in Hodan district and captured it from al-Shabaab on 5 July. Five civilians were killed during the fighting.

==== August ====
On 1 August at 7:30 pm, MP Kalif Jire Warfa (aged 54) was killed as he left Maruwas mosque in Mogadishu. Two armed men shot him six times in both head and shoulder killing him instantly. Both killers escaped the scene. al-Shabaab later claimed responsibility for the assassination.

In the beginning of August at least 4 civilians were killed by snipers at Bakaara market. The area had been almost deserted after heavy battles have raged the area and snipers could be seen on most of the rooftops in the area.

After becoming under increased pressure from SNA and AMISOM several al-Shabaab leaders including Fuad Mohamed Qalaf and Omar Shafik Hammami fled from Mogadishu on 4 August. al-Shabaab almost completely left the bases in Suqa Holaha, Tawakal Village and Daynile.

When aid was to be delivered to IDPs at Badbaado camp in Mogadishu on 5 August at least 7 civilians were killed. The fighting started after SNA soldiers tried to loot the aid and IDPs tried to prevent it.

During the night from Friday to Saturday, 6 August, al-Shabaab abandoned all areas in Mogadishu. This move came after heavy fighting on 5 August, which included some of the most intensive firepower used by AMISOM. SNA and AMISOM had penetrated Bakaara market and closed in on the Mogadiscio Stadium which had been al-Shabaab's main base in the capital. al-Shabaab fighters fled in small cars from all areas and some left their weapons and al-Shabaab uniform to slip into civilian dresses. al-Shabaab leaders Sheikh Mukhtar Robow and Hassan Dahir Aweys are believed to have fled to Bakool region of Somalia.

On the morning of Saturday 6 SNA and AMISOM were in control of most of the areas abandoned by al-Shabaab including Bakaara market, Mogadiscio Stadium and the avenues Sodonka and Warshadaha. That same day, President Sharif Sheikh Ahmed said that al-Shabaab had been completely expelled from Mogadishu. On 9 August, al-Shabaab militants attacked SNA army bases in Dayniile district. Nine people were killed and 13 were injured in the attack. The following day al-Shabaab launched new attacks on SNA in Yaqshid district. Two SNA soldiers were killed and two other injured. Later that day a car full of explosives blew up in the outskirts of Mogadishu leaving 14 people dead and 20 injured. On 9 August al-Shabaab attacked AMISOM bases in Abdiaziz district. Four were killed and five injured.

On 14 August, al-Shabaab declared they would switch from conventional tactics to hit and run attacks and vowed to continue such attacks, claiming they inflicted more casualties on AMISOM that way. The following day al-Shabaab claimed the tactic to be successful and to have killed one AMISOM soldier from Uganda.

AMISOM and SNA continued to advance in Mogadishu, and took control over Hotel Ramadan, Hotel Kaah, Ex-Mali TV center, Towfik junction, Towfik market, Ahmed Gurey School and Jungle on 16 August. They encountered some resistance from al-Shabaab fighters, but they were quickly overrun.

Three employees (a nurse, a logistic officer and a driver) of Daynile Hospital in Mogadishu were kidnapped by al-Shabaab in the Huriwa district on 17 August. Seven people and 15 were injured in fighting between AMISOM/SNA and al-Shabaab.

At least three people were killed and six injured when SNA clashed in Dharkenly district of Mogadishu on 20 August. The fighting started after disagreement on the taxation at a check-point and looting of aid supplies.

Fuad Mohamed Qalaf spoke at a mosque in Eelasha-Biyaha district of Mogadishu on 21 August. He announced that al-Shabaab would assassinate those who support TFG and civilians would not be spared. The same day six civilians were injured in a grenade attack aimed at a SNA foot patrol at the Dabakayo-Madow village in the Dharkenyley district. al-Shabaab is the prime suspected as the bomber escaped from the scene. Three civilians were injured when al-Shabaab attacked a SNA base in Dharkinley district with hand grenades.

al-Shabaab attacked SNA bases in Yaqshid district on 23 August. Three people were killed and the injured. The following day the Somali Police Force arrested three men carrying explosives in Dharkinley district.

On 27 August, al-Shabaab attacked AMISOM and SNA on several locations in Mogadishu. Ten people were killed and 15 injured. Soldiers from SNA foiled a suicide attack at KM4 capturing a car full of explosives.

900 SNA soldiers graduated from Bihanga Military training School in Bihanga, Uganda on 31 August.

==== September ====
On 2 September, the 39-year-old Malaysian camera operator Noramfaizul Mohd Nor, who was working for Malaysia's national Bernama TV, was shot and killed and fellow journalist and camera operator Aji Saregar Mazlan from TV3 (Malaysia) was wounded. The incident happened on Shakhala road, at the Kilometer Four intersection. It was four AMISOM soldiers from Burundi that opened fire on their vehicle, which was being escorted by soldiers from SNA.

In August TFG decided to remove all checkpoints in and around Mogadishu. Fighting broke out when soldiers of SNA were to remove a checkpoint in Wadajir district on 2 September. Shortly after the fighting started soldiers from AMISOM arrived and restored order. The checkpoint were run by militia loyal to Ahmed Da'i, the district commissioner of Wadajir. Four people including two SNA soldiers were killed and six was wounded.

al-Shabaab attacked SNA and AMISOM bases in the former defense ministry, Gulwadayaasha military camp, Jale Siyad faculty and Ex-control Afgoye junction on 9 September. Three people were killed and five sustained injuries.

On 8 September, a soldier from SNA started to shoot at IDPs in the Waberi district. Six civilians were killed and three people were injured. The soldier was arrested at the scene.

==== October ====
On 20 October AMISOM entered Daynile, the last district in Mogadishu that was under the control of al-Shabaab. The offensive started well with little resistance. As they advanced into the Daynile district al-Shabaab sealed off their retreat route and opened fire with rifles, belt-fed machine guns and rocket-propelled grenades. A Burundian peacekeeper, Cpl. Arcade Arakaza later said: -It was a classic envelope trap, with the Shabab drawing the peacekeepers deeper into their lair, sealing off the escape routes and then closing in from all sides. AMISOM managed to fight back and capture the Daynile police station. In the evening al-Shabaab reinforced with fighters from Lower Shabelle, Bay and Bakool launched a counterattack that recaptured the strategically important Daynile police station. The following day AMISOM sent reinforcements to the area and heavy fighting continued. When the battle was over more than 70 soldiers from AMISOM (mostly Burundi) had been killed and the Daynile district had fallen in the hands of SNA and AMISOM. At least 60 of the AMISOM soldiers killed in the ambush were put on display by al-Shabaabs spokesperson Ali Mohamud Rage in the Alamada area, 18 km outside Mogadishu.

== See also ==
- Somali Civil War
- Battle of Mogadishu (1993)
- Battle of Mogadishu (2006)
- Fall of Mogadishu (2006)
- Battle of Mogadishu (March–April 2007)
- Battle of Mogadishu (November 2007)
- Battle of Mogadishu (2008)
- Battle of South Mogadishu (2009)
- Battle of Mogadishu (2009)
