= Battle of South Mogadishu =

2009 battle in Somalia

- Part of the Somali Civil War (2009–present)
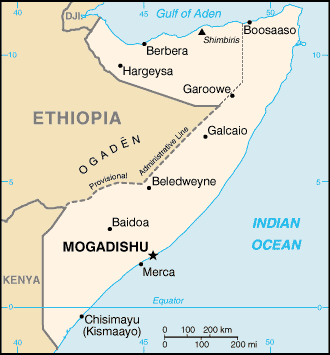
- The battle occurred in the Somali capital of Mogadishu
Date	February 24–25, 2009
Location	Mogadishu, Somalia
Result	Indecisive

Belligerents
Al-Shabaab	(Somalia) ARS-D-TFG coalition

Commanders and leaders
Abu Mansur	(Somalia) Sharif Ahmed

Casualties and losses
15 insurgents killed	6 policemen killed
- 48 civilians killed

The Battle of South Mogadishu occurred in the Somali capital of Mogadishu on February 24, 2009.

The battle's name includes South, when referenced, in order to distinguish it amongst the nine major Battles of Mogadishu during the decades long Somali Civil War. This was the first battle in that city after Somalia had made the effort to elect a new president in January 2009, and this embryonic return to democracy means that this is considered a starting point of the Somali Civil War (2009–present) within the longer civil war.

The battle, fought mainly in the south of the city, left at least 87 people dead and 90 more injured. Rebels fired volleys of mortar bombs at the presidential palace, located on a hilltop in the Wardhigley district. A base for African Union and government troops in the Hodan district was also fired upon as was the nearby Howlwadag district. The recently elected President Sheikh Sharif Sheikh Ahmed was said to be within his palace at the time of the incident.

At least 11 civilians were amongst the dead, with workers at the main Madena Hospital indicating that at one stage approximately 45 wounded had been admitted. 15 Al-Shabab and Hizbul Islam fighters and 6 Transitional Federal Government Policemen were killed in the fighting.

Sheikh Omar Iman, the chairman of Hizbul Islam condemned the attacks on AMISOM, but admitted that 'some members' of the group had been involved.

== See also ==
- Somali Civil War
- War in Somalia (2006–2009)
- Battle of Mogadishu (1993)
- Battle of Mogadishu (2006)
- Fall of Mogadishu (2006)
- Battle of Mogadishu (March–April 2007)
- Battle of Mogadishu (November 2007)
- Battle of Mogadishu (2008)
- Battle of Mogadishu (2009)
- Battle of Mogadishu (2010–11)
