= Battle of Mogadishu (2006) =

Battle of the Somali civil war

Second Battle of Mogadishu
- Part of the Advance of the Islamic Courts Union
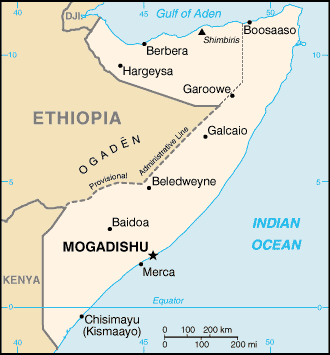
- Location of Mogadishu in Somalia
Date	7 May – 11 July 2006
Location	Mogadishu, Somalia
Result	Islamic Courts Union victory

Belligerents
Islamic Courts Union	Alliance for the Restoration of Peace and Counter-Terrorism

Commanders and leaders
Sharif Sheikh Ahmed; Hassan Dahir Aweys	Mohamed Qanyare; Musa Sudi Yalahow; Botan ise alin

Strength
Unknown	Unknown

Casualties and losses
- Over 350 deaths

The Second Battle of Mogadishu was fought for control of Somalia's capital city, Mogadishu. The opposing forces were the Alliance for the Restoration of Peace and Counter-Terrorism (ARPCT), and militia loyal to the Islamic Courts Union (ICU). The conflict began in mid-February 2006, when Somali warlords formed the ARPCT to challenge the ICU's emerging influence. The ICU's influence was largely generated by wealthy financial donors who sought to enable the Islamic Courts Union to seize power in the country to bring stability. The battle is referred to as the Second Battle to distinguish it amongst the nine major Battles of Mogadishu during the decades-long Somali Civil War.

It was found after the battle that the United States was supporting the ARPCT due to concerns that the ICU had ties to al-Qaeda. The ICU militia won control of Mogadishu and ARPCT forces left the city.

== Background ==
In 2005, it was reported that multiple independent Islamic courts had started to work cooperatively under the umbrella of Shariah Law, which would then become the Islamic Courts Union. This movement then seize power of Mogadishu, creating an Islamic movement throughout Somalia. This cooperation among Islamic courts caused Somalian warlords and businessmen to band together and form the ARPCT, with the support of American and Ethiopian aid. After this unification, the members began to mobilize in order to prevent an Islamic movement from taking full power over the capital city. The ARPCT began by conducting various attacks and kidnappings in early 2006, but as the year went on these aggressions caused a conflict to arise.

== Battle ==
In May 2006, the fighting intensified between warlords and militia loyal to ICU, which controlled around 80% of the city. There had been previous conflict throughout Somalia involving the ARPCT, but nothing that lasted more than a few days, so the outbreak and continuity of this battle signified that it was, in fact, a change from the previous state. On 4 June 2006, the ICU seized Balad, 30 miles north of Mogadishu. Balad had previously been under the control of forces loyal to Musa Sudi Yalahow. By the end of the conflict, it was reported that around 350 people had been killed, with thousands displaced.

On 5 June 2006, Somali Prime Minister Ali Mohamed Gedi fired four ministers (who were also clan leaders) whose private armies were involved in the fighting. Gedi fired National Security Minister Mohamed Afrah Qanyare, Commerce Minister Musa Sudi Yalahow, Militia Rehabilitation Minister Botan Ise Alin and Religious Affairs Minister Omar Muhamoud Finnish, according to government spokesman Abdirahman Nur Mohamed Dinari. He also invited the Islamic courts for talks.

On 5 June 2006, Sheikh Sharif Ahmed, the ICU's chairman, reportedly seized Mogadishu, saying in a radio broadcast: "We won the fight against the enemy of Islam. Mogadishu is under control of its people." The ICU's success has been attributed to the Islamic movement's ability to transcend clan politics.

Following Mogadishu's fall, there were two competing rallies. Mogadishu's largest clan, the Abgaal, held a rally in the city's northern part, reportedly drawing about 3000. AP reports the demonstrators shouting "We don't need Islamic deception!" and "We don't want Islamic courts, we want peace!" There was a competing rally in support of the ICU. At that rally, Sheikh Sharif Ahmed is quoted as saying "Until we get the Islamic state, we will continue with the Islamic struggle in Somalia," to a crowd of about 500.

With the decisive loss to the Islamic courts union, the TFG removed 4 prominent ARPCT members from their positions within the TFG.

The ARPCT's remaining forces are said to have fled to Jowhar. A member of the ARPCT coalition said that the coalition has "no immediate plans," following their decisive loss.

On 14 June 2006, following a stand-off that lasted for approximately eight days, the ICU reportedly attacked the remaining ARPCT forces in Jowhar, routing them and seizing the town. Ali Mohamed Gedi has since then requested peacekeeping forces from the African Union, and neighboring states such as Kenya have imposed sanctions on the fleeing warlords, barring them entry into their lands.

== Legacy ==
Ali Mohamed Gedi has since requested peacekeeping forces from the African Union, and neighboring states such as Kenya have imposed sanctions on the fleeing warlords, barring them entry into their lands.

In December 2006, Ethiopia declared war on the victor of the battle, the ICU. In addition to the long-standing tensions between Ethiopia and Somalia over land claim, the Ethiopian government did not look favorably on the ICU being in power in Somalia. This conflict was short lived, falling in favor of Ethiopia.

== United States support for ARPCT ==
Michael Zorick (the U.S. State Department's political officer for Somalia), who had been stationed in Nairobi, was reassigned to Chad after he sent a cable to Washington criticizing Washington's policy of paying Somali warlords. The Times stated, "The American activities in Somalia have been approved by top officials in Washington and were reaffirmed during a National Security Council meeting about Somalia in March."

On 7 June 2006, the Republic of the Congo's president and current African Union head, Denis Sassou-Nguesso, criticized the United States for its involvement in fighting in Mogadishu following his meeting with President George W. Bush and Secretary of State Condoleezza Rice.

== See also ==
- Somali Civil War
- Battle of Mogadishu (1993)
- Fall of Mogadishu (2006)
- Battle of Mogadishu (March–April 2007)
- Battle of Mogadishu (November 2007)
- Battle of Mogadishu (2008)
- Battle of South Mogadishu (2009)
- Battle of Mogadishu (2009)
- Battle of Mogadishu (2010–11)
