= Battle for Central Somalia (2009) =

Series of battles in various Somalilands in 2009

Central Somalia spring fighting of 2009
- Part of Somali Civil War, War in Somalia (2009-present)
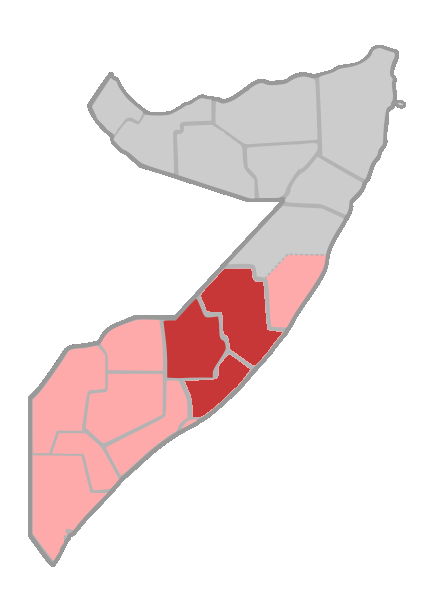
Date	May 11, 2009 – October 1, 2009
Location	Hiiraan, Middle Shabelle and Galguduud, Somalia
Result	ARS-administration destroyed. Insurgent alliance is broken, fighting loses esteem.
Territorial changes	Rebels take control of Middle Shabelle and parts of Hiraan.

Belligerents
Al-Shabaab; Hizbul Islam; Foreign Mujahideen	Somalia: (Somalia) ARS-TFG coalition; Ahlus Sunnah wal Jamaah; Ethiopia

Commanders and leaders
Mukhtar Robow "Abu Mansoor"; Muktar Abdirahman "Godane"; Ali Saleh Nabhan †; Ali Mohamed Hussein; Abdirahman Hassan Hussein; Ali "Dheere" Mohamud; Hassan Dahir Aweys; Omar Abu Hadi; Hassan Turki; Abdi Osman "Qorey"; Muse Abdi Arale; Hassan Mahdi; Ibrahim Yusuf; Abdinasir Jalil; Aden Abdi †; Abdullahi Hiiraan; Shuriye Farah Sabriye	(Somalia) Sharif Ahmed (Somalia) Omar Abdirashid Ali Sharmarke (Somalia) Yusuf Hussein Dumal (Somalia) Omar Hashi Aden X (Somalia) Muktar Hussein Afrah (Somalia) Mohamed Daqane Elmi; Abdulkadir Ali Omar; Abdirahman Ibrahim Ma'ow; Abdirahman Farah Dirow †; Ahmed Osman Abdalla known "Inji"; Dahir Addow Alasow; Sheikh Abu Yusuf; Sharif Ali Ahmed; Aden Abdi Nur; Sheikh Osman Ali; Abdirisak Asari; Omar Mohammed Farah Omar Osman Afrah

Casualties and losses
80 killed (ICU claim)	Total: 52 KIA; (Somalia) 50+ KIA; (Ethiopia) 2 KIA
- 124+ civilians killed 3,300+ displaced
- Sheikh Ibrahim Yusuf and Shiekh Abdinasir Jalil were former commanders of the ICU administration in Beledweyn who switched sides with his men and joined Hizbul Islam.

A series of battles in Hiiraan, Middle Shabelle and Galguduud, between rebels of al-Shabaab and Hizbul Islam and Somali government forces and ICU militants loyal to the government, erupted during spring 2009. The fighting led to al-Shabaab capturing major government strongholds and Ethiopian forces re-entering Somalia and setting up bases in Hiraan. There was a halt in fighting during a government offensive in Mogadishu, which started on May 22.

== The fighting ==
On May 11, al-Shabaab fighters seized control of the Buloburde district of Hiraan, which was under control of the ICU militants. They entered the town from all sides with a lot of battle Toyota pickup-trucks and immediately positioned themselves at the district police station. This was the first district in Hiraan to fall in the hands of al-Shabaab.

On May 12, ICU forces attacked al-Shabaab in Mahas, Hiraan. The fighting killed seven, after which it came to a standstill. Calm returned to the town on May 13, as the attackers had seized control of the town and al-Shabaab forces withdrew and started regrouping.

On May 14, fighting took place overnight between al-Shabaab and Ahlu Sunnah wal Jamaah militants in the village of Yasoman, in Hiraan. The fighting left one insurgent dead and four people injured.

May 15, al-Shabaab fighters attacked the town of Mahas, of which they had lost control of two days earlier. The fighting was between al-Shabaab and pro-government group Ahlu Sunnah wal Jamaah, which had fought al-Shabaab in January for control of Galgudug. Four people were killed in the fighting and hundreds of civilians fled the town, also its telecommunication was cut off. Fighting also broke out in the village Wabho, in the Elbur district of Galgudug, between the same two groups. Ahlu Sunnah Wal Jamaah won the battle for Wabho, which left five people dead. On the same day, Sheikh Abdirahman Ibrahim Ma'ow, the chairman of the ICU administration in Hiran said he would take steps to settle tensions in the region. However, fighting still continued after this.

May 16, in Beledweyn, Hiraan's capital, the governor: Sheikh Abdirahman Ibrahim Ma'ow was targeted by two roadside bombs but survived the blast. Tension was high in the town as ICU fighters roamed the city streets and security was tightened, two suspects were arrested. One civilian was killed and two civilians and one ICU militant were injured when al-Shabaab forces threw grenades at ICU militants standing on guard on the Beledweyne Bridge. In response, the ICU stopped the flow of traffic and conducted search operations. In total, 68 people were killed in the fighting on May 15 and 16. The government claimed they had killed 47 al-Shabaab fighters, including a white man in Mahas and Wabho.

On May 17, there were major battles in Jowhar and in Garsale village. Al-Shabaab took control of the key town of Jowhar, which is the capital of Shabeellaha Dhexe. It has an important strategic location as the road that links Mogadishu to the central region passes through it. The fighting in the city left three ICU militants dead, in a 20-minute battle, whereafter ICU and other pro-government militia fled the city and hundreds of al-Shabaab fighters entered it. This was seen as a major victory for al-Shabaab. Fighting in Mahas (in Hiraan) killed at least 17 people, while fighting in El Bur (in Galgudug) killed 16 people, the wounded were transported to hospitals in Grui El and Beledweyn. Meanwhile, al-Shabaab started sending forces from Mogadishu (where there was a major battle from May 7 to 14) and Bal'ad (a district between Mogadishu and Jowhar) into Hiraan and Shabelle Dheexe as reinforcements.

May 18, at least seven people, three al-Shabaab fighters and four civilians were killed in the village of Ayne after pro-government militants ambushed an al-Shabaab convoy which was transporting fighters from Bulo Burte to Mahas. Due to the ambush, the convoy was forced to head back to their base in Bulo Burte. A battle broke out for the village of Ceyn, three people were killed in the fighting. Meanwhile, Hizbul Islam captured another key, strategic town, named Mahaday, which lies some 23 km north of previously captured Jowhar, the capital of Shabelleh Dheexe. The seizure of Mahaday is a big blow to the government as three out of four districts in Shabelle Dheexe (Middle Shabelle) had now fallen in the hands of al-Shabaab which already controls Shabeellaha Hoose (lower Shabelle), previously the government controlled all of Shabelle Dheexe.

May 19, al-Shabaab rebels attacked an ICU base near Jowhar, were forces who were rooted out of Jowhar, were now stationed. Both sides used heavy weapons but no casualties were reported. Meanwhile, al-Shabaab raided UN offices in Jowhar, taking the equipment which was left behind when the UN evacuated the compounds before the al-Shabaab takeover. In the North of Hiraan, Ethiopian forces entered the country with 18 military trucks and set up a base at the strategic Kala-Beyr junction.

May 20, 3 combatants were killed as ICU fighters attacked the town of Mahaday (In Shabelleh Dhexe, North of Jowhar), held by Hizbul Islam rebels. Hizbul Islam also killed 1 civilian, for unknown reasons. This day, al-Shabaab formed a new Islamic administration in Jowhar, capital of Shabelleh Dhexe and hometown of Sheikh Sharif Ahmed. Al-Shabaab commander, Sheikh Abdirahman Hassan Hussein was appointed the new governor of Shabelleh Dhexe. Due to the ongoing fighting in the region, Beledweyn's mayor: Sheikh Aden Omar ("Jilibay"), resigned.

May 24, the deputy commander of the ICU forces in Hiran: Abdirahman Farah Dirow was killed and commander of the Islamic Courts Union in Hiran: Ahmed Osman Abdalla "Inji" was injured in a car crash.

May 26, heavy fighting occurred in near Mahaday between al-Shabaab and government fighters. Sheikh Dahir Addow Alasow, the ICU governor of Middle Shabelle claimed his forces had "achieved success", while Sheikh Abdirahman Hassan Hussein, the al-Shabaab governor of Middle Shabelle said his forces were successful and that they had killed 5 ICU militants and captured one ICU battlewagon.

May 27, Sheikh Mo'alin Dahir Adow Alasow said the ICU was preparing for a massive offensive to re-take the Middle Shabelle region from al-Shabaab and Hizbul Islam.

May 28, Col. Omar Hashi Aden, who is Somalia's security minister, was attacked by insurgents when he came back from his visit to Ethiopia. His convoy was attacked while traveling through Hiraan region. Col. Hashi was unharmed however 1 guard was killed and 1 wounded.

June 1, Ahlu Sunna Waljama'a imposed curfew in Guriel, an important town in Galgudug. Also al-Shabaab and Hizbul Islam launched a joint offensive against government forces in Magurto Village, which is near Mahaday, a town under rebel control.

June 4, government forces re-captured the town of Mahaday in Middle Shabelle. No casualties were reported and no comments were given by Hizbul Islam, which took control of the town on May 20.

June 5, Heavy fighting broke out again in Wabho between al-Shabaab and Hizbul Islam on one side and Ahlu Sunna Walja'a at the other side. Hizbul Islam spokesman Sheikh Muse Abdi Arale reported that they had captured the town which was previously under control of Ahlu Sunna Walja'a. Independent sources confirmed the fighting has stopped (thus indicating that one side had won) but there were no independent reports on who now controlled the town. 40 people were killed and 60 were injured, these casualties include rebels, militants and civilians. Initially Ahlu Sunna Waljama'a also claimed victory for the fighting. Later Ahlu Sunna Waljamaa's deputy information secretary, Sharif Ali Ahmed, claimed they had injured Hizbul Islam's chairman (and leader of the ARS) Sheikh Hassan Dahir Aweys and killed the group's vice-chairman (and leader of the Ras Kamboni Brigades) Hassan Turki. These claims were denied by Hizbul Islam Spokesman: Sheikh Hassan Mahdi. Initially Ahlu Sunna Waljama'a spokesman Aden Abdi Nur claimed that they had killed him but after Sheikh Aweys contacted the media to confirm he was alive they said he was injured. Sheikh Mahdi however stated that Sheikh Aweys isn't injured either, and was, in fact, never present at the battle as he is in Mogadishu. On June 7 at last it was confirmed that rebels had won the battle and seized control of Wabho. Ahlu Sunna Waljama'a militia commanders declined to comment. 31 Ahlu Sunna Waljama'a and 24 al-Shabaab and Hizbul Islam fighters were killed during this battle.

On the same day there were also clashes in Hiraan's capital: Beledweyn, were an explosion in left 2 dead and 4 injured. Sheikh Abdi Osman ("Qorey"), a spokesman for Hizbul Islam, claimed that ICU forces were behind the explosion. Later armed clashes broke out were in 3 people were injured. Hizbul Islam controls the west side of the town and the ICU controls the east side.

On June 12 and June 13, Ahlu Sunna Waljama'a carried out security operations in Abud wak.

June 28, fresh fighting started in El Baraf, a village in Mahaday district of the Middle Shabelle region. ICU forced attacked the al-Shabaab held village but failed to take it over, there were casualties at both sides.

June 29 an explosion in Beledweyn near the al-Aqsa school left 1 civilian injured. It is unknown which group was behind this attack.

July 4, Sheikh Abdinasir Jalil, a former commander of the training for ICU administration in Beledweyn town joined Hizbul Islam with his men and vowed to fight TFG forces in the city and attack Ethiopian forces in El-gal village, which lies 18 km from Beledweyn. He said that the government officials want to bring Ethiopian troops inside town and that is the reason they switched sides. Former ICU officials who joined Hizbul Islam, held a press conference and announced that the ICU administration in Hiraan had collapsed as they joined the insurgents. Sheikh Ibrahim Yusuf, top security commander in Beledweyn also defected along with his forces. General Muktar Hussein Afrah was sent to Beledweyn along with TFG troops and put in charge there by the TFG as the ICU administration had collapsed. Many ICU officials including MPs resigned that day, next to Sheikh Abdinasir Jalil Ahmed (head of training) and Sheikh Ibrahim Yusuf (head of security), also Sheikh Osman Abdulle Barqadle, the army commander of Ugas Khalif airport, and Sheikh Abdullahi Garamgaram, the deputy chief of the emergency forces, resigned.

In response, TFG forces led by general Muktar Hussein Afrah started military manoeuvers in the East side of the city.

July 17, Islamist forces attacked Galshire station in the neighborhood of October and Bunda-weyn in the city of Beledweyn. Four civilians were injured by the fighting. The city of Beledweyn remains divided as Islamist Insurgents control the cities West side and pro-government forces control the cities East side.

July 18, Hizbul Islam Forces attacked Beledweyn's jail creating an hour-long battle which injured 4 people.

July 22, al-Shabaab and Ahlu Sunna Waljama'a fighters fought a fierce battle for control of the Mahas district of Hiraan. This comes as al-Shabaab fighters attacked the district in Northern Hiraan which was under control of Ahlu Sunna Waljama'a. Sheikh Abdirisak Asari, spokesman for Ahlu Sunnah, claimed they had killed 40 al-Shabaab fighters and only lost 6 of their own fighters. Sheikh Ali "Dheere" Mohamud, the Al Shabaab spokesman claimed victory for the fighting and that al-Shabaab had taken control of the district. It was reported that the fighting continued on July 23 and that both sides were receiving reinforcements. Civilians are reportedly fleeing the area.

July 23, al-Shabaab attacked the Warholo village in Galgudud, which was under control of Ahlu Sunna Waljama'a. No real casualties were reported but residents expressed concern about the heavy fighting.

July 24, Sheikh Abdirisak Al-Ashari, the spokesman of Ahlu Sunna Waljama'a, held a press conference where in he claimed victory for the fighting in both Hiraan and Galgudug. He said they had killed famous al-Shabaab fighters, captured battle wagons and taken control of the zones around Goobo. There had been no word from al-Shabaab, yet.

July 26, government forces entered Western Beledweyn, which was previously under control of Islamist forces. Both sides exchanged gunfire before government forces took control of several neighbourhoods. After a day of heavy fighting government forces claimed victory and took control of the entire city. Afterwards, a curfew was imposed in the town.

August 3, government forces launched security operations in Beledweyn and arrested 5 suspected insurgents. Despite the government takeover, insurgents still operate underground in the city. Meanwhile, al-Shabaab conducted operations in Jowhar in a crackdown on government supporters and armed bandits.

August 5, a civilian was killed by a bombing in Beledweyn.

August 9, 2 people were injured after government forces opened fire on a vehicle in Beledweyn town.

August 11, al-Shabaab withdrew from the El Dher district in Galgadud region peacefully, whereafter Ahlu Sunnah Wal Jamee'a militias entered and took control of the district. This leaves only 1 district of Galgudug, the El Bur district was under al-Shabaab control as of August 11, with the rest in hands of Ahlu Sunnah Wal Jamee'a. Although the takeover was said to be peaceful, it was reported that the sound of sporadic gunfire could be heard in the far areas of the village near where the new forces of Ahlu Sunna Waljam'a advanced. Al-Shabaab commanders did not comment on the issue.

August 13, a battle broke out in El Dher district in Galgudug. The district was previously in control of al-Shabaab, which withdrew peacefully on August 11. On August 14 they attacked the district and al-Shabaab spokesman: Sheikh Ali "Dheere" Mohamud told reporters in Mogadishu that Al Shabaab seized control of the district. However, Ahlu Sunnah spokesman: "Abu Qadi," claimed they had won the battle and were still in control. He claimed they had suffered only 3 casualties and have killed 27 and captured 10 al-Shabaab fighters. Local sources reported both sides were still present at the outskirts of the city. In later reports he claimed they had lost 15 fighters, 30 being injured and they had killed 50 al-Shabaab fighters and won the battle. Claims by Abu Qadi cannot be independently verified.

August 18, Ahlu Al-Sunnah clerics claimed to have re-taken control over Wabho, and government forces said to have reached the Insurgent stronghold of Bule Burte.

August 20, heavy fighting broke out in Bule Burte as government forces from Beledweyn attacked the Insurgent controlled town. 19 people were killed during the battle, which took place, mostly in the cities outskirts, the battle ended as government forces retreated, though they remained stationed around the city. At the same time, Insurgents re-took control of Western Beledweyn.

August 21, there was a battle in Mahas district between Ahlu al-Sunna and al-Shabaab, the attack by Ahlu al-Sunnah was successfully repulsed.

August 24, 4 government forces were killed during a bombing in Beledweyn.

August 27, a joint TFG-Ethiopian invasion, expels al-Shabaab fighters from Western Beledweyn, which they had recently re-taken.

August 31, Sheik Abdirahman Ibrahim Ma'ow, the ICU-governor of Hiraan, said his administration is not a part of the TFG anymore and decided to become independents after lack of cooperation from the TFG. This comes as al-Shabaab insurgents have created their own administration in Hiraan.

September 1, Ahlu Wal Sunnah conducted operations in Galdogob district in Mudug region, during these operations one person was killed and 1 was injured.

== Ethiopian involvement ==
May 31, Ethiopian forces launched search and seizure operations in Hiraan, in Kalaberyr village, near Beledweyn.

June 12, Ethiopian forces with several battle wagons entered in Balanbal town in Galgudud and set up military bases.

June 14, Ethiopians said they had come there to fight foreign mujahedin which they described as "foreign enemies of Ethiopia and Somalia" and launched operations to search for them in Balanbal town which they control. Sheikh Hassan Ya'qub Ali, head of the information affairs for Islamic administration in Kisimayo warned the Ethiopians that "there is no candy and dates to eat from here in Somalia. But the men who chased you forcibly from the country are here in Somalia."

June 18, a suicide bombing in Beledweyn killed 35 people and injured over 50. Somalia's Security Minister: Col. Omar Hashi was among the dead. The suicide bombing targeted a meeting between TFG and Ethiopian commanders.

June 22, Ethiopian forces started launching search and seizure operations in Kala-beyrka intersection in Hiran region.

June 30, Ethiopian forces entered El-gal and Ilka'adde villages which are less than 20 km north of regional capital Beledweyn. Reports from Kala-beyrka intersection say that more extra troops from Ethiopia crossed from the border.

July 4, Ethiopians withdrew from their bases in Banabal town in Galgudug.

July 16, Ethiopians withdrew from their bases in beyrka intersection in Hiran region.

July 25, More Ethiopian troops with many battle wagons were deployed to Kala-beyrka intersection in Jawil village of the Hiran region.

August 29, Ethiopians, after taking part in anti-insurgency operations in the city, open military bases in Beledweyn. On August 31, Ethiopians retreated from the city.

November 16, Ethiopians completely vacated their base in Kala-beyrka intersection, they had been present there for nearly 4 months.

November 22, Islamist leaders of Hizbul Islam warned Ethiopia of the consequences of interference in Somalia.

December 16, Ethiopian troops detain a large number of clan elders.

== Aftermath: Post-Insurgent break up clashes ==
November 4, fighting erupted in Beledweyn as Hizbul Islam forces attacked a government base in Janta Kundishe, which is the main TFG base in the city. Hizbul Islam fighters managed to forcibly route the TFG forces out of the base and take it over. At least 5 people were killed and 8 people were injured. The next day, Islamist officials imposed a Curfew in their half of the town.

November 10, in Galkayo town at least six security force personnel and ten civilians were injured as revels threw handgrenades at an armed convoy carrying Somalia's police chief. At the same day, Hizbul Islam established a new administration for Hiraan region. However, there was dispute as Muse Abdi Arale, Hizbul Islam's Defense Secretary and Sheikh Abdullahi Hiiraan, another top Hizbul Islam official announced the appointment of Sheikh Shuriye Farah Sabriye as the new governor. This dispute came as Sheikh Abdullahi Usman 'Qorey', a Hizbul Islam official in Beleweyne, called the move as unconstitutional and one that is meant to please a clan in the region, claiming: "Shuriye is a killer, he committed several atrocities against the mujahidins."

November 14, Yusuf Ahmed Hagar, a former TFG official was gunned down by armed insurgents in Beledweyn.

November 17, outrage broke out among Ahlu Sunnah leaders as Sharif Ahmed called their group as "another armed militia fighting in Somalia". They said this was insulting the group and claiming they are the same as al-Shabaab. Sharif Ahmed later apologized for the misunderstanding.

November 19, a blast in Galka'o, in Mudug region killed 5 people. Ahlu Wal Sunnah leaders blamed al-Shabaab for the attack. A similar explosion happened in the city on December 2, as masked gunmen threw a grenade at a mosque.

December 14, 6 Children were killed by a land-mine explosion.

== See also ==
- Battle of Mogadishu (2009)
