= Battle of Mogadishu (November 2007) =

Part of the War and Insurgency in Somalia

Battle of Mogadishu (2007)
- Part of the War and Insurgency in Somalia
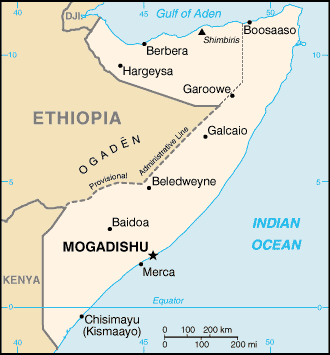
- Map of Somalia
| Date | November 8–16, 2007 |
| Location | Mogadishu, Somalia |
| Result | Inconclusive |

Belligerents
| Al-Shabaab | Ethiopia (Somalia) Transitional Federal Government |

Casualties and losses
| Unknown | 9 Ethiopian soldiers killed 6 TFG soldiers killed |
- 83 civilians killed

The Third Battle of Mogadishu, in November 2007, was a series of confrontations in Mogadishu, Somalia in which 91 people died, mostly civilians killed by Ethiopian troops. The battle is called the Third Battle, or will include the date, in order to distinguish it amongst the nine major Battles of Mogadishu during the decades long Somali Civil War.

== Timeline ==
The next few days there was a lull in the fighting but on November 16, the chief of TFG intelligence was killed and the next day insurgents attacked Ugandan troops in the K-4 neighbourhood. One insurgent was confirmed to be killed in the fighting with Ugandan soldiers. One TFG policeman and a civilian were also killed in an IED attack on the same day.

== Violations of the laws of war ==
UNICEF have voiced their concern at the increasing number of rape cases in the country's war-torn capital Mogadishu. The representative for Somalia, Christian Balslev-Olesen has said that, "Sexual violence and rape are part of the game now". He also said that rapes were mainly committed by government militias and their Ethiopian allies. Ethiopian troops have been accused of numerous rapes of civilians in Somalia, which is a violation of human rights.

According to the UN, the battle displaced about 200,000 people in two weeks, with 600,000 or about 60% of Mogadishu's population fleeing overall since February. Somali rights group Elmand claims to have verified almost 6,000 civilian deaths in Mogadishu alone, with 700,000 fleeing.

== See also ==
- Somali Civil War
- Battle of Mogadishu (1993)
- Battle of Mogadishu (2006)
- Fall of Mogadishu (2006)
- Battle of Mogadishu (March–April 2007)
- Battle of Mogadishu (2008)
- Battle of South Mogadishu (2009)
- Battle of Mogadishu (2009)
- Battle of Mogadishu (2010–11)
