= Battle of Mogadishu (March–April 2007) =

Major urban battle between Ethiopian troops and Somali insurgents

Battle of Mogadishu (2007)
- Part of the War in Somalia
- Mogadishu skyline during the fighting in March 2007
Date	21 March – 26 April 2007
Location	Mogadishu
Result	Ethiopian/TFG offensive fails, insurgency escalates

Belligerents
Popular Resistance Movement (PRM) (Somalia) Hawiye clan militia	Ethiopia; Somalia; Uganda

Casualties and losses
427 killed 150 captured	11 killed (Somalia); 37 killed 68 wounded (Ethiopia); 1 killed 5 wounded (Uganda); 1 Mil Mi-24 helicopter gunship shot down 2 tanks damaged
- Civilian casualties: 1,176 Somali civilians killed (Hawiye claim) 4,600 Somali civilians wounded 11 Belarusian killed

The Battle of Mogadishu (March – April 2007) was a major military engagement between the Ethiopian National Defence Force (ENDF) and allied Somali Transitional Federal Government (TFG) forces on one side, and a coalition of Somali Islamist insurgents and clan militias fighting under Muqawama (Resistance) umbrella on the other.

Launched to deliver a decisive blow against the insurgency opposing Ethiopia’s military occupation, the offensive failed to achieve its objectives, and insurgent strength subsequently increased. The battle saw the use of ENDF tanks, artillery and airstrikes from helicopter gunships within the city, which were used indiscriminately in densely populated areas. Intense urban combat inflicted heavy damage on roughly one-third of Mogadishu’s buildings and much of the city’s economic infrastructure. Time magazine described the battle as “some of the most savage fighting” the capital had ever witnessed.

== Background ==
On 27 December 2006, Mogadishu, then under the control of the Islamic Courts Union (ICU) government fell to Ethiopian and TFG forces. At the start of January 2007, the Ethiopian government claimed it would withdraw "within a few weeks" The Transitional Federal Government (TFG) announced that the rivaling Islamic forces had been defeated and that no further major fighting was expected to take place. The security situation in the capital began to rapidly deteriorate and warlords who had been removed by the Islamic Courts began to reassert themselves.

=== Emergence of the insurgency (January–February 2007) ===
The TFG proved to be incapable of controlling Mogadishu, or of surviving on its own without Ethiopian troops. On 9 January 2007, TFG president Abdullahi Yusuf landed at Mogadishu airport and was escorted by Ethiopian troops to the presidential palace, Villa Somalia. Most of the population of the city opposed it and perceived it to be a puppet government. The military occupation was marked by indiscriminate violence towards civilians. Homes were raided in search of ICU loyalists, with lootings, beatings and executions of suspected collaborators commonplace.

Early 2007 saw Somalis rally behind what was referred to as the muqawama (resistance) or kacdoon (uprising). On 19 January, insurgents in Mogadishu launched an assault on the ENDF/TFG held Villa Somalia. The ICU claimed responsibility for the attack, declaring it as part of a "new uprising". The following day an ENDF convoy in the city came under ambush. Residents reported that the Ethiopian troops had responded by firing into crowds indiscriminately. Mogadishu was divided into two segments, one controlled by the ENDF/TFG and the other by emerging resistance movements.

By the end of January, a new ICU field commander was selected for the Banaadir region (Mogadishu and its environs) and many of the organization's fighters regrouped. At the same time guerrilla warfare was being waged in the southern regions of the country, with heavy losses being inflicted on ENDF/TFG forces. Al-Shabaab did not heavily participate in the insurgency or large scale fighting for much of 2007, opting instead to carry out bombings and assassinations while further establishing itself. In late February and early March 2007, insurgent attacks on ENDF/TFG forces in Mogadishu became a daily occurrence, growing in both complexity and sophistication. During March, the resistance began in earnest with units of Somali guerillas engaging in hit-and-run attacks on Ethiopian military positions in Mogadishu. The Ethiopian military response was characterized by large scale and indiscriminate artillery and aerial bombardments of civilian areas. That month Ethiopian and TFG troops began suffering mounting casualties to the insurgency. In response to the growing strength of the insurgency, an Ethiopian led offensive in Mogadishu was planned.

== The battle ==
=== First round of fighting (21 March–23 March) ===
In a bid to crush the growing insurgency, Ethiopian/TFG forces besieged entire neighborhoods and initiated a campaign of mass arrests. Ethiopian troops launched major offensives in the city, utilizing large scale bombardments with rockets and artillery on Mogadishu neighborhoods deemed to be insurgent strongholds. On several occasions the ENDF also occupied and looted the city's hospitals. Ethiopian troops were primarily responsible for the large scale bombardment and significant civilian losses that occurred in the city during March and April 2007.

The Ethiopia army had been surprised by the intensity of the insurgent resistance and in response began unleashing their heavy firepower on the city. During the fierce fighting, the Ethiopian army reportedly engaged in the carpet bombing of neighborhoods. TFG President Abdullahi Yusuf announced in a radio address that "any place from which a bullet is fired, we will bombard it, regardless of whoever is there." The presence of Ethiopian troops reinforced the authoritarian behavior of the TFG. Human Rights Watch reported that the Ethiopian army extensively utilized BM-21 Grad rocket shelling to bombard densely populated Mogadishu neighborhoods, which the organization described as a violation of international humanitarian law. According to Kenyan journalist Salim Lone, ENDF and TFG forces deliberately blockaded the delivery of urgently needed humanitarian supplies and food in an attempt to 'terrify and intimidate' civilians associated with those challenging the military occupation.

==== Il-76 shoot down ====
On 23 March 2007, a TransAVIAexport Airlines Ilyushin Il-76 plane crashed in Mogadishu. The plane is thought to have been shot down. There were 11 people on board the aircraft, all but one Belarusian crew members died in the crash. The other remaining survivors were found wandering around the crash site and later died in hospitals.

That same day a ceasefire was signed between Ethiopian forces and Hawiye clan elders.

=== 2nd round of fighting (29 March–2 April) ===
After five days of relative calm in the city, the ceasefire collapsed with Ethiopian troops initiated offensive operations to crush "anti-government forces". ENDF tanks supported by infantry pushed into the center of the city and were attacked by Islamic insurgents. Pitched battles involving the use of helicopter gunship followed. The bodies of ENDF troops were dragged through the streets during the fighting for the city and an Ethiopian helicopter was shot down by Somali fighters using portable surface-to-air missiles.

On 1 April, it was reported that the death toll of the previous four days of heavy fighting in the capital is at least 849 killed civilians, 200 insurgents and 36 Ethiopian soldiers along with the one Ugandan soldier, for a total of 1,086 dead.

=== 2nd ceasefire ===
Fighting was essentially halted for 2 April, after Hawiye clan leaders declared a truce with Ethiopian military officials starting 2 pm 1 April. They further called on Ethiopian troops to withdraw from areas they had occupied during the past few days of fighting. Although there had been a lull in fighting on 2 April, Salad Ali Jelle, the deputy Defence Minister of the TFG denied that there had been or would be any ceasefires between Hawiye clan leaders and Ethiopian military forces. Jelle stated that it was not Hawiyes involved in the recent fighting, but "remnants of the defeated Islamist" and called upon civilians residing in insurgent positions to evacuate the area.

=== 3rd round of fighting ===
Around the capital, the insurgents barricaded themselves behind makeshift sandbanks and raced through streets on armed pickups. Ethiopian and TFG troops supported by heavy artillery made forays into their strongholds with armored vehicles.

On 11 April, at least two people have been killed and three others were wounded in a renewed fighting that erupted in north of the Somalia capital between interim government troops and local insurgents overnight. However, on 12 April Somalia's Ambassador to Ethiopia Abdikarin Farah stated that Mogadishu was now peaceful for the first time in sixteen years. More Ethiopian troops were deployed into the city.

On 13 April, a spokesman for the Hawiye clan declared war on Ethiopian troops but clarified that, "The war is not between Ethiopia and our tribe, it is between Ethiopia and all Somali people."

On 14 April, two government soldiers are killed in an ambush in the capital.

On 17 April, heavy street fighting renewed in the northern part of Mogadishu, with at least 11 dead civilians. And on the next day heavy mortar fire erupted killing another 3 civilians. The fighting continued into 19 April, with another 12 civilians dead, while a suicide car bomb exploded at an Ethiopian army base wounding at least 10 Ethiopian soldiers. In addition 10 more soldiers were wounded when their truck hit a landmine in the city.

Aid workers report that nearly half a million people fled the city, almost 1/2 of the population and only fighters and men protecting their property remain in the city.

It was reported that in the latest round of fighting from 17 to 24 April, at least 358 people had been killed, including 45 insurgents, and 680 were wounded. It is estimated that close to 320,000 Somalis have fled Mogadishu since February, with many more still trapped there.

On 26 April, Ethiopian troops took insurgent strongholds in Northern Mogadishu. They first occupied Tawfiq and Ramadan, before moving further north and capturing the Balad checkpoint in Northern Mogadishu, the main one for Mogadishu and an important supply line for insurgents.

Somali Prime Minister Ali Mohammed Ghedi declared victory over the insurgents on 26 April, saying "the worst of the fighting in the city is now over" and urging displaced residents to return to their homes. He also claimed that his forces, backed by Ethiopian tanks and artillery, had overrun an insurgent stronghold in northern Mogadishu, capturing at least 100 enemy fighters.

== Result ==
The Ethiopians characterized the violence in this period as being part of a 'final push' against the rebels, but the fierce fighting in Mogadishu during March and April 2007 did not to quell the growing insurgency. The Ethiopian/TFG offensive of March and April 2007 had failed.

== See also ==
- Somali Civil War
- Battle of Mogadishu (1993)
- Battle of Mogadishu (2006)
- Fall of Mogadishu (2006)
- Battle of Mogadishu (November 2007)
- Battle of Mogadishu (2008)
- Battle of South Mogadishu (2009)
- Battle of Mogadishu (2009)
- Battle of Mogadishu (2010–11)
