= Cyprien Hakiza =

Burundian army general

- Military career
- Allegiance: Burundi
- Branch: Burundi Army
- Rank: Major General
- Unit: AMISOM
- Commands: Deputy commander of AMISOM
- Conflicts: Battle of Mogadishu (2010–2011)

Cyprien Hakiza is a major general in the Army of Burundi.

From September 2009, he has been the deputy commander of AMISOM replacing the late Major General Juvenal Niyoyunguruza. He rotated out of AMISOM in September 2011.

Military offices
Preceded by Major General Juvenal Niyoyunguruza	Deputy commander of AMISOM; September 2009 - September 2011	Succeeded by
