= Juvenal Niyoyunguruza =

- Died: 17 September 2009; Mogadishu, Somalia
- Military career
- Allegiance: Burundi
- Branch: Burundi Army
- Service years: –2009
- Rank: Major General
- Unit: AMISOM
- Commands: Deputy commander of AMISOM; 1st. military region
- Conflicts: Battle of Mogadishu (2009)

Juvenal Niyoyunguruza was a major general in the Army of Burundi.

== Niyoyunguruza's death ==
On 17 September 2009 witness claims two trucks bearing United Nations markings entered the AMISOM compound at Aden Adde International Airport in Mogadishu. Minutes later a twin suicide attack rocket struck the headquarters of AMISOM, killing Juvenal Niyoyunguruza, the deputy commander of AMISOM, and 6 other soldiers. Later the group al-Shabab claimed responsibility for the attack.

Military offices
| Preceded by None | Deputy commander of AMISOM: 17 September 2009 | Succeeded by Major General Cyprien Hakiza |
