= Abdikadir Yusuf Aar =

Somalian terrorist (died 2011)

- Born: Somalia
- Died: 16 March 2011; Mogadishu, Benadir, Somalia
- Cause of death: KIA
- Occupation: Senior militant in Al-Shabaab
- Movement: Al-Shabaab

Abdikadir Yusuf Aar (Somali: Cabdiqaadir Yuusuf Aar; fl. 1995 - died 16 March 2011) aka Sheikh Qalbi, was an Islamic terrorist and senior Al-Shabaab officer from the Juba region.

He had been a member of Al-Itihaad Al-Islamiya (AIAI) in Luq from 1995 to 2002. In Al-Shabaab he served as leader in both Juba and Gedo regions.

During the "anti-insurgency offensive" launched by TFG and AMISOM to drive Al-Shabaab out of Mogadishu he was killed in action (KIA) near to the former Defense Ministry in Mogadishu on March 16, 2011.
