= 2007 TransAVIAexport Airlines Ilyushin Il-76 crash =

Aviation incident in Somalia

Coordinates: 02°03′43.86″N 45°22′38.86″E

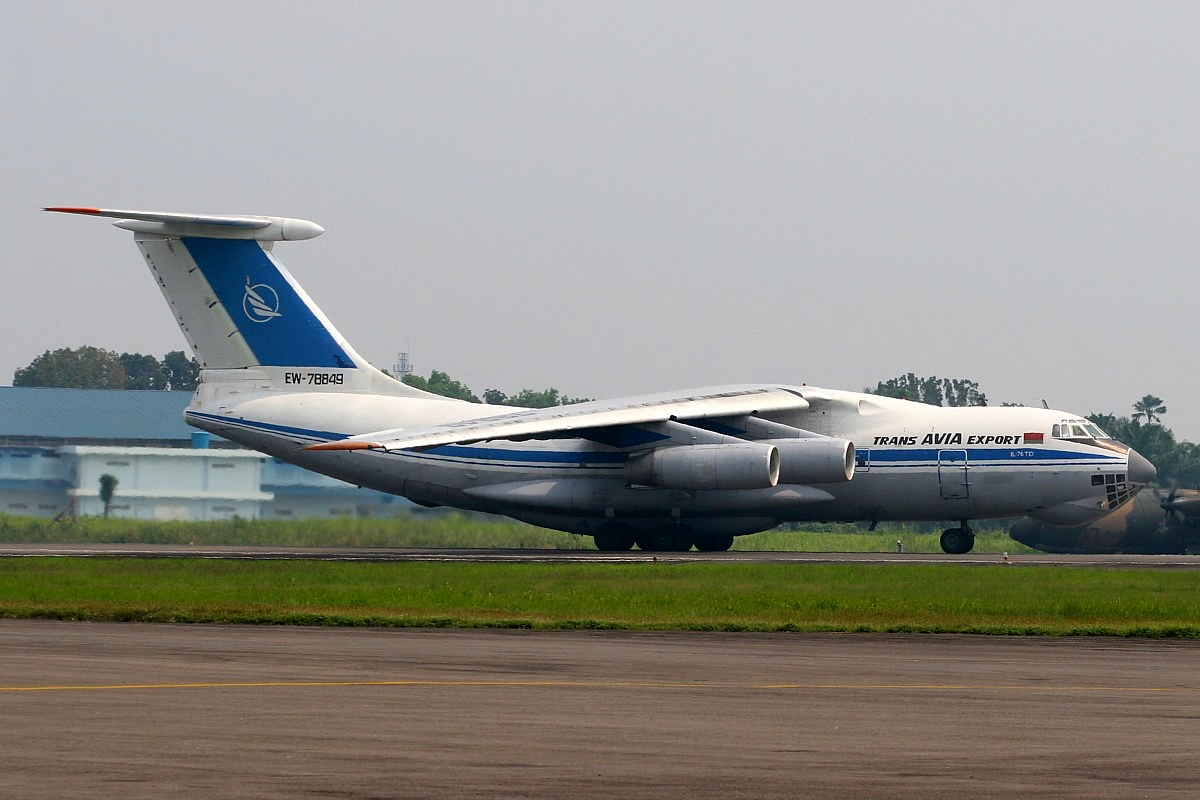
- EW-78849, the aircraft involved in the accident, at Polonia International Airport in 2005.

Occurrence
- Date: 23 March 2007
- Summary: Suspected shootdown
- Site: Mogadishu

Aircraft
- Aircraft type: Ilyushin Il-76TD
- Operator: TransAVIAexport Airlines
- Registration: EW-78849
- Occupants: 11
- Passengers: 4
- Crew: 7
- Fatalities: 11
- Survivors: 0

On 23 March 2007, a Belarusian Ilyushin Il-76 cargo aircraft operated by TransAVIAexport Airlines crashed in the outskirts of Mogadishu, Somalia, during the Battle of Mogadishu, killing all 11 crewmembers aboard. The plane was carrying equipment for African Union troops in Somalia.

The BBC reported that the aircraft had been shot down.

== Background ==
=== Previous occurrence ===
On 9 March 2007, a Transaviaexport Ilyushin Il-76TD, registration EW-78826, that was about to complete an Entebbe–Mogadishu flight carrying Ugandan peacekeepers and equipment, made a successful emergency landing at Mogadishu International Airport after having been struck by a rocket propelled grenade and catching fire on approach to the airport of destination. The rocket had apparently been fired from a boat while the plane passed over it at a height of 150 metres (490 ft). A crew of nine Belarusians were aboard the aircraft, along with six UPDF soldiers; all were unharmed. Islamist militia claimed the attack, saying that African Union peacekeepers were their target, as they were seen as invading troops; Somali officials denied any such attack, and said the incident was due to the aircraft experiencing a technical failure.

There had been a report with unverified claims circulating on the internet stating that the aircraft had actually been carrying a secret load of infantry fighting vehicles for Ugandan troops. This report also claimed that these vehicles saved all occupants on board.

=== Aircraft and crew ===
The aircraft involved was an Ilyushin Il-76, a large Russian-built cargo aircraft. Registered as EW-78849, the Il-76 had been on a chartered cargo flight carrying equipment to Ugandan AMISOM peacekeepers in the Somali capital of Mogadishu. All of the crew members were Belarusian. Four of the personnel on board the accident aircraft were engineers who had worked on repairing another aircraft of the same type that had been the subject of an attempted shootdown 14 days earlier. Much of the equipment on board EW-78849 was for repairing the aircraft damaged earlier; the rest of the cargo was humanitarian aid. The first aircraft was still crippled at the departure time of EW-78849, and TransAVIAexport were considering whether to cannibalise it for re-usable parts.

== Crash ==
EW-78849 was due to fly back to Belarus carrying equipment used for the repairs of EW-78826. The flight plan included a refuelling stop at Djibouti. Bound for Minsk, the aircraft had taken off from Mogadishu International Airport at 14:00 local time. According to Somali Interior Minister Mohamed Mahamud Guled, as soon as it reached 10,000 feet (3,000 m) altitude, the pilot reported a problem in engine number two, stating that he would turn back to the airport. He was in the process of attempting to return to the airport for an emergency landing when one wing exploded, separated from the aircraft and fell into the Indian Ocean, while the rest of the plane continued, on fire, along the beach at a low altitude before crashing.

The crash occurred in an area called Kuluweyne, with the main part of the wreckage landing near a farmer's hamlet. A Reuters reporter who visited the scene reported seeing crushed animals, four corpses still on the ground, and wreckage spread across an area the size of four football fields. Rescuers found ten of the crew members dead at the scene, and an eleventh alive and wandering around the crash site. He was transported to a hospital where he died the same day. Operations at the airport were not affected by the crash, with Somali Prime Minister Ali Gedi and his delegation departing as scheduled from the airport the next day, destined for the Arab League summit in Saudi Arabia.

=== Alleged shootdown ===
A civilian who witnessed the crash said he heard what he believed to be a surface-to-air missile being fired immediately before the accident. "I saw with my eyes when the plane, which was flying low-level, was hit by a rocket and then fell to the ground," Shabelle reporter Maryan Hashi said. There have been reports that the projectile came from a small boat, and others that it came from a nearby farmers' market. The plane appears to have been struck by the missile at an altitude of about 150 metres (490 ft).

=== Crew ===
All eleven occupants on board the aircraft died in the incident. Their bodies were transported back to Belarus in a Gomelavia aircraft on 30 March 2007. On 2 April funeral services were held in Belarus for the victims, with hundreds attending. Eight of the victims were buried in a single lot at Maskouskiya cemetery, the rest in Vitsebsk.

== Reactions and aftermath ==
Members of the Somali Transitional Federal Government presented different accounts of what had happened. Originally a government spokesman claimed the aircraft had been struck by a rocket. Later some officials stated that the cause of the crash was unknown, and have since maintained that the crash occurred as a result of an accident, and that it had not been shot down.

Local witness reported seeing the aircraft hit by a missile.

However, while not claiming responsibility for this specific attack, an Islamist web site published claims that the plane was indeed struck by a missile. Within 24 hours of the crash, Belarusian officials confirmed that the plane had been shot down. Somali soldiers began to guard the area against interference. TransAVIAexport suspended all flights to Somalia as a result of the incident, and Belarus advised its airlines not to enter Somali airspace. An investigation was launched by the Belarusian transport prosecutor's office for violations of Article 126 of the Criminal Code, which concerns international terrorism.

On 5 April 2007, the US Federal Aviation Administration released a communication prohibiting US airlines and commercial operators from operating over Somali airspace at altitudes below 26,000 feet (7,900 m), due to possible threats from rocket propelled grenades and shoulder-launched missiles.

According to the Small Arms Survey 2008 Yearbook, the aircraft was shot down by one of two 9K38 Iglas fired by al-Shabaab.

== See also ==
- List of airliner shootdown incidents
