= TransAVIAexport Airlines =

Belarusian national cargo airline

TAE Avia

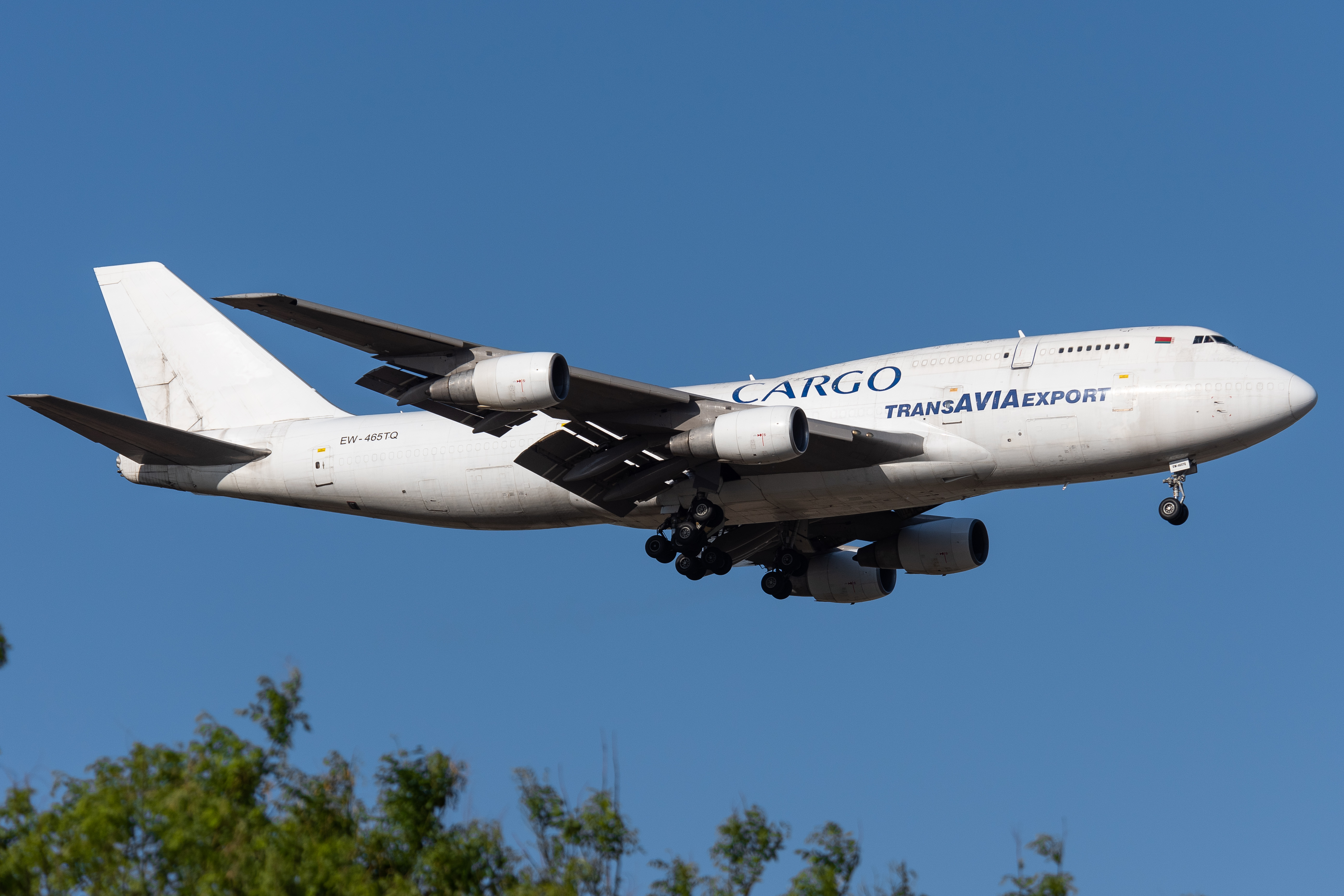
- Boeing 747-300SF
IATA	ICAO	Call sign
-	TXC	TRANSEXPORT
- Founded: December 1992; 33 years ago
- Hubs: Minsk International Airport; Sharjah International Airport
- Fleet size: 6
- Parent company: State-Owned
- Headquarters: Minsk, Belarus
- Website: transaviaexport.com

TAE Avia, formerly named TransAVIAexport Airlines, is a Belarusian national cargo airline. It is based at Minsk International Airport in Belarus, with a hub at Sharjah International Airport, in the United Arab Emirates. The airline is the last commercial 747-300 operator.

== History ==
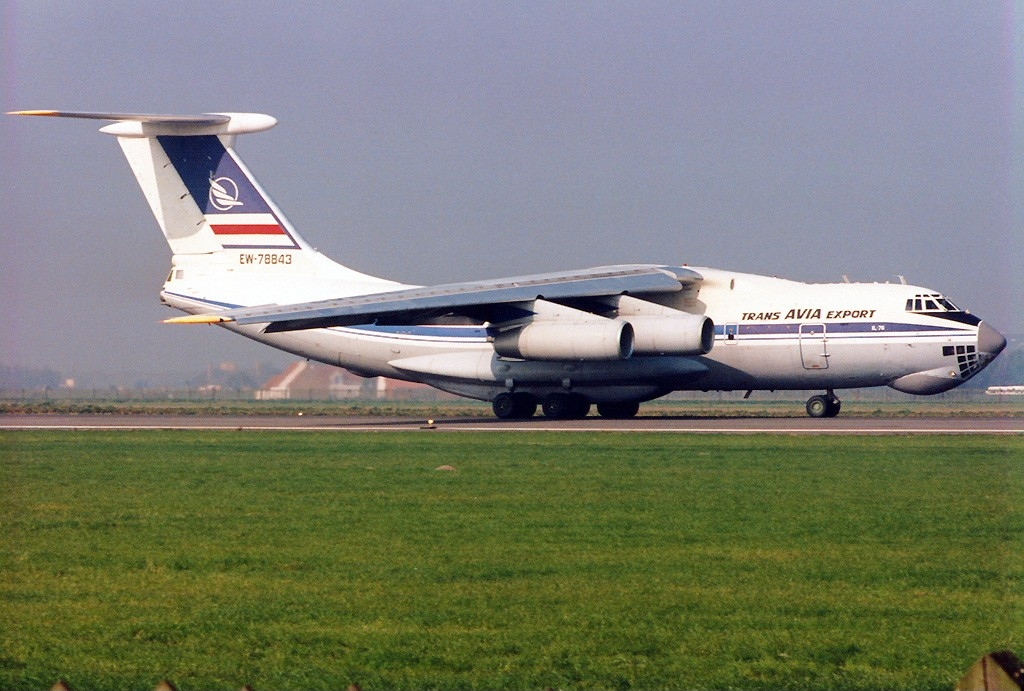
Ilyushin Il-76TD in previous colors

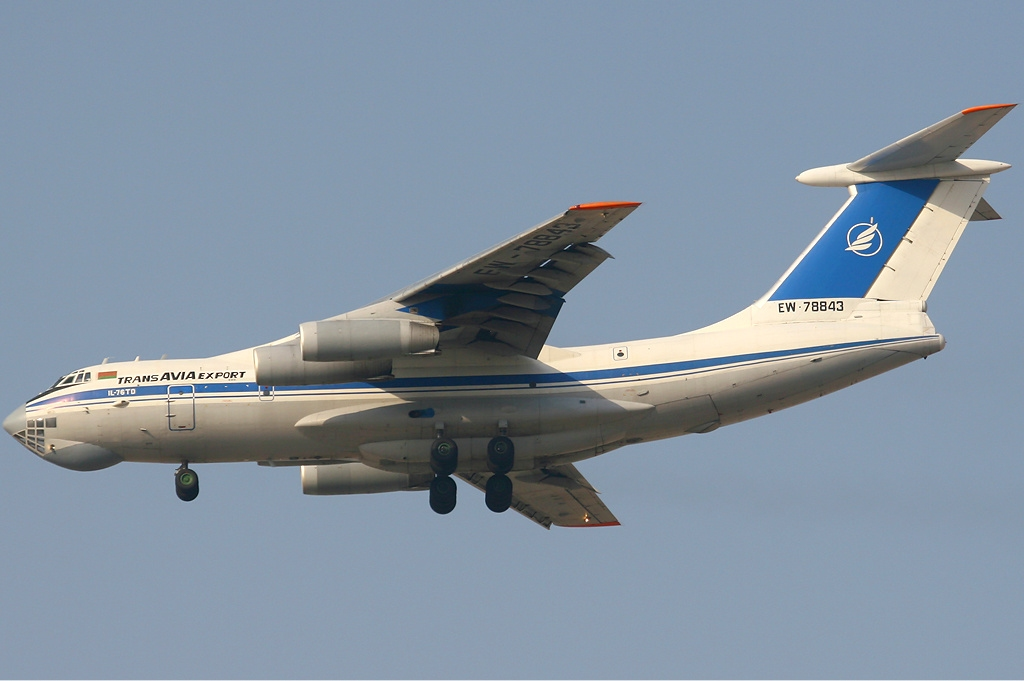
Ilyushin Il-76TD

TransAVIAexport Airlines was established in December 1992 in Belarus. The airline operates worldwide cargo flights. In 2021, the airline changed its name to TAE Avia.

On 2 December 2021, TransAVIAexport and two aircraft belonging to the airline were added to the Specially Designated Nationals and Blocked Persons List by the United States Department of the Treasury. In 2022, the airline was additionally blacklisted by the United Kingdom, the European Union, Switzerland and Japan.

== Fleet ==
TAE Avia's fleet included the following aircraft (as of October 2019):

Aircraft	In service	Orders	Notes
Boeing 747-300SF	1	—	Registration EW-465TQ
Ilyushin IL-76TD	5	—	—
Total	6	—	—

== Accidents and incidents ==
- On March 9, 2007, a TransAVIAexport Airlines Ilyushin Il-76TD (s/n 1003499991, registered EW-78826), on approach at Mogadishu, Somalia, was hit by a projectile, which was later confirmed to be a RPG by Belarus officials. The aircraft landed safely but sustained substantial damage.
- On March 23, 2007, a TransAVIAexport Airlines Ilyushin Il-76TD (s/n 1013405192, registered EW-78849) was shot down by an anti-aircraft missile while taking off from Mogadishu, Somalia, killing all 11 occupants on board.
- On August 22, 2017, a TransAVIAexport Airlines Ilyushin Il-76TD (registered EW-78799) on approach to Juba, South Sudan struck a tree short of the runway, destroying several houses and killing a 5-year-old girl.
