= Ali Dhere =

Sheikh of Islamic Courts

- علي ديري
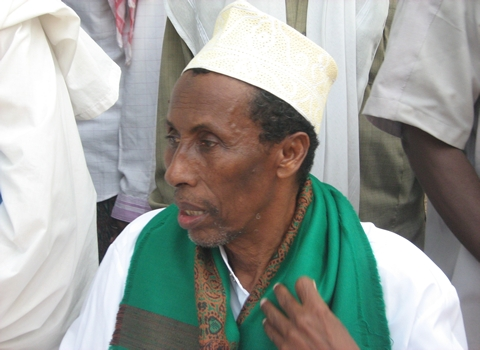
- Organization: Islamic Courts Union

Sheikh Cali Sheikh Maxamuud Sheikh Cali Dheere (Somali: Cali Dheere, Arabic: الشيخ على محمود), also known as "Sheekh Cali Dheere", was a Somali cleric based in Mogadishu. He was instrumental in the establishment one of the most prominent Islamic courts in Mogadishu during 1996. Often called the Sheikh Ali-Dhere court, it brought together scholars, elders, business leaders and politicians as a reaction to the deteriorating security situation in North Mogadishu, and Siisii street in particular. Its success brought popular support to him, which was used in turn to challenge political leaders of the Muddolod clan, and ended in a clash with Ali Mahdi which eventually brought down the court.

Many people confuse Sheikh Ali Dheere who established the first Islamic Courts in Mogadishu in 1996, and another man commonly referred to Sheikh Ali Dheere named Ali Mohamed Rage who is the spokesperson of the Al Shabaab. In 2014, Sheikh Dheere would declare on Radio Mogadishu that Al-Shabaab could be characterized as Khawarij due to their behaviour and characteristics.
