= Battle of Mogadishu (2008) =

Battle in the Somali Civil War

- Part of the Ethiopian occupation of Somalia (2006–2009)
Date	April 19–20, 2008
Location	Mogadishu, Somalia
Result	Indecisive

Belligerents
ICU insurgents (Somalia) ARS; Al-Shabaab	Ethiopia (Somalia) Transitional Federal Government

Casualties and losses
7 ICU fighters	Unknown
- Civilian casualties: 98 killed (Elman Human Rights Group claim)

The 2008 Battle of Mogadishu began when soldiers from Ethiopian National Defence Force (ENDF) entered parts of the capital held by the insurgency on 19 April, sparking heavy street fighting in the northern part of the city.

The battle spread out over several districts of Mogadishu, predominantly Daynile, Yaaqshiid and Huriwa resulting in the most fierce fighting between the Ethiopians and the insurgency since the start of 2008. During the fighting for Huriwa the ENDF carried out the Al-Hidaya Mosque massacre.

== Timeline ==
On 19 April, Somali insurgents ambushed a group of Ethiopian soldiers, who entered an area of Mogadishu on foot, sparking heavy battles. The intense clashes spread out across three districts in the northern quarter of the capital Mogadishu, with Ethiopian troops expanding into insurgent strongholds for the first time in weeks. The initial fighting lasted more than an hour, ending with Ethiopian troops retreating back to their main bases at Mogadishu Stadium and the ex-pasta factory.

Abdi Rahim Isa Adow, a spokesman for the Islamic insurgents, confirmed that seven militants had been killed but said that "a large number of Ethiopian soldiers" had also been killed. Witness Omar Abdulahi said that among the dead he counted were two old men shot by Ethiopian soldiers inside their homes. Nasteho Moalim said her 7-year-old daughter and three neighbors were killed by tank shells fired by Ethiopian forces that hit their homes.

On April 20, Islamist insurgents ambushed a security vehicle in the capital's Madina neighbourhood, killing two soldiers and a shopowner who was caught in the crossfire. Later in the day, five Somali soldiers and three insurgents in addition to a number of civilians. Two Ethiopian soldiers were confirmed to be among the dead. On April 21, the Somali capital was largely quiet as residents ventured out onto the streets to collect the bodies of the dead or escape the city.

=== Hidaya Mosque massacre ===
Huriwa and neighboring districts were a focal point of the battles. As fierce fighting was underway in Huriwa during the 19th and 20th of April, al-Hidaya came under deliberate artillery fire from Ethiopian forces.

According to several witnesses, Ethiopian soldiers stormed a mosque and killed several occupants. 11 bodies were later found, some with their throat slit and others shot to death. Of the 11 dead victims, nine were regular congregants at the mosque and reportedly were part of the Tabliiq wing of Sunni Islam. Tabliiq official Shiekh Abdi-kheyr Isse said the Ethiopians had "slaughtered" the clerics. "The first person they [Ethiopian soldiers] killed was Sheikh Said Yahya, the Imam," a witness said, adding that the late Imam opened the mosque door after the soldiers knocked.

== Casualties ==
Ninety-eight civilians died in the fighting. Most of the casualties were caused by Ethiopians using heavy artillery and tank shells in residential areas of the war-torn capital, according to the Elman Human Rights Group.

The ICU reported the loss of seven fighters. A spokesman for the Islamic Courts Union, Sheikh Ibrahim Suley, said the real death toll from the violence was much higher. "The Ethiopians killed around 200 people and kidnapped 160 others including 41 Koranic students...We will continue fighting the Ethiopians and those under the protection of their tanks. We call on them to repent," Suley told Reuters.

== See also ==
- Battle of Mogadishu (March–April 2007)
- Battle of Mogadishu (November 2007)
