= Fall of Mogadishu =

Beginning of Ethiopian military occupation of Mogadishu

- Part of the War in Somalia (2006–2009)
Date	28 December 2006; 19 years ago
Location	Mogadishu, Somalia
Result	Ethiopian/TFG Victory: ICU withdraws from capital; ENDF/TFG forces take control of Mogadishu; Emergence of Islamist insurgency

Belligerents
Ethiopia (Somalia) Transitional Federal Government	Islamic Courts Union

The Fall of Mogadishu was a major episode of the Ethiopian invasion of Somalia. It occurred on 28 December 2006, when the Ethiopian National Defence Forces (ENDF) entered the capital in support of the Transitional Federal Government (TFG), following the withdrawal of Islamic Courts Union (ICU) troops deployed in southern and central Somalia. The ICU had governed Mogadishu since June 2006, becoming the first authority since 1991 to place the city under a single administration.

In just over a week of conventional warfare across central and southern Somalia, ICU forces fought ENDF/TFG troops across multiple fronts. On 25 December, the Ethiopian Air Force carried out airstrikes on Mogadishu airport. After several more days of open warfare, the ICU withdrew from Mogadishu on 27 December without attempting to hold the city, and Ethiopian and TFG troops marched into the capital unopposed the following day.

The city's capture marked the opening of an Ethiopian military occupation in Mogadishu and the beginning of a rapidly expanding Islamist insurgency. The TFG, wholly dependent on Ethiopian troops to survive, bore virtually no responsibility for the ICU's battlefield losses or the fall of the capital. In the period that followed, Mogadishu was effectively split between areas held by ENDF/TFG forces and districts dominated by emerging resistance networks.

The security situation deteriorated soon after the fall of the capital, and warlords disposed by the ICU began to reassert influence amid the new occupation-era power vacuum.

== Background ==
Before the full-scale invasion began, more than 10,000 ENDF troops had been built up in deep inside Somalia since the first incursion in June 2006. Much of the Bay and Bakool regions had already been occupied by Ethiopian troops. Days before the full scale invasion, there 20,000 Ethiopian troops were stationed in and around Baidoa, the capital of Bay region, while the ICU claimed the figure deployed in Somalia had risen to over 30,000.

The first battle of the full-scale invasion erupted on 19 December 2006 at the battlefield of Idaale, 60 kilometres south of Baidoa. After taking mounting losses following a week a fighting against the Ethiopian National Defence Force in open battle, the Islamic Courts Union began withdrawing it forces across its front lines almost simultaneously. American gunships, including helicopters and the AC-130 provided air support for Ethiopian troops. During this fighting the Ethiopian Air Force bombed Mogadishu airport, killing several people in an airstrike.

The TFG envoy to Ethiopia announced they would lay siege to Mogadishu until it surrendered, rather than directly assault the city. "We are not going to fight for Mogadishu to avoid civilian casualties...Our troops will surround Mogadishu until they surrender," he told reporters in Addis Ababa. On 26 December, Ethiopian PM Meles Zenawi announced the Ethiopia troops were not planning to enter Mogadishu.

On 27 December, the Islamic Courts vowed to wage a guerilla movement that would extend for "years and years and years." That day ENDF/TFG forces advanced on Mogadishu from two directions and residents began fleeing the capital. The city was reported to be in an anarchic state as Islamists fighters began withdrawing or changing uniforms and melting into the population. The drug Khat, which had been banned by the ICU, returned to public sale. As Ethiopian troops approached, they were accompanied by the warlords who the ICU had defeated in mid-2006. The Ethiopians allowed the warlords to regain control over the fiefdoms they had previously lost to the courts.

=== Resignation of ICU Leaders ===
As fighting neared Mogadishu, the Islamists turned over their weapons to the clans in the capital and the Hawiye, one of Somalia's largest clans, began discussing a peaceful resolution with the interim government. The stability created by the Islamic militias also began to collapse with people returning to their homes and bandits once again roaming the streets. Fighting began early on the 27th in Yaqshid, a district in northern Mogadishu, as clan militias attempted to raid an arms warehouse. The clan militias, who had been disarmed by the ICU, appeared to be attempting to rearm in preparation for the return of the warlords associated with the government. Abdirahman Dinari, spokesperson for the TFG, stated that these were a minority of militias and that they would be "dealt with" once they had taken control of the city. Most businesses had closed by the 28th, as proprietors waited for developments.

The top leaders of the ICU, including Sheikh Hassan Dahir Aweys, Sheikh Sharif Sheikh Ahmed and Sheikh Abdirahman Janaqow, resigned in anticipation of the siege. Their official press release called upon ICU fighters to secure the areas in which they were stationed and expressed their regret that foreign powers had invaded the country and that Somalia would return to chaos.

== Entry of ENDF/TFG ==
On December 28, TFG spokesman Abdirahman Dinari cautiously expressed, "We are taking control of the city and I will confirm when we have established complete control... Our forces already effectively control Mogadishu because we have taken over the two control points on the main roads outside the city... Within two to three hours we will capture the whole city." He also added that the government was in control of 95% of the country, but a state of emergency would be imposed to bring law and order back to the country. An ebullient Member of Parliament, Mohamed Jama Fuurah, called Reuters from the port of Mogadishu saying, "The government has taken over Mogadishu. We are now in charge." Pro-government militias were said to have control of key locations, including the former presidential palace.

Ali Ghedi, the Prime Minister of the transitional government, stated that Somali government troops had entered Mogadishu without resistance, as well as the town of Afgoye on its outskirts. Mohamed Jama Furuh, a member of parliament and former warlord, took control of Mogadishu's seaport on the government's behalf, an area he had controlled before the rise of the ICU as a warlord. The President, Abdullahi Yusuf, asserted that TFG troops were not a threat to the city-dwellers, though there were some reports of gunfire in the city. On December 29, Ghedi entered the city after consultations with clan leaders on the outskirts. He was received by cheering crowds and anti-Ethiopian protests.

Roughly 3,000 ICU fighters fled towards the port city of Kismayo, their last remaining stronghold, 300 miles (500 km) to the south. In Kismayo, executive leader of the ICU, Sharif Sheikh Ahmed was defiant, "We will not run away from our enemies. We will never depart from Somalia. We will stay in our homeland."

== Military occupation and insurgency ==
On December 31, in Mogadishu a missile aimed at Ethiopian troops slammed into a residential area reportedly killing one woman and injuring a man and their daughter. Also, an explosion occurred around 9pm local time at the Hotel Ramadan in Yaaqshiid district, a former headquarters of the ICU. It was speculated that the target might have been Ethiopian troops who had taken over control of the hotel.

On 7 January, anti-Ethiopian protests broke out in Mogadishu, with hundreds of residents hurling stones and shouting threats towards ENDF troops. Ethiopian troops opened fire on the crowd after stones struck their patrol car, resulting in the death of two; including a 13-year boy. That same night a former ICU official was also assassinated in the city by gunmen. In an attempt the assert control over the city, TFG PM Ali Gedi announced a 3 day ultimatum for the population to turn over their weapons. On 13 January, the TFG imposed martial law. The directives, which included a ban on public meetings, attempts to organize political campaigns and major media outlets, was enforced by Ethiopian troops. Warlord militia checkpoints began reappearing on Mogadishu roads and insecurity started once again returning to the city.

On 9 January 2007, TFG president Abdullahi Yusuf landed at Mogadishu airport and was escorted by Ethiopian troops to the presidential palace, Villa Somalia. The TFG proved to be incapable of controlling Mogadishu, or of surviving on its own without Ethiopian troops. Most of the population of the city opposed the TFG and perceived it to be a puppet government.

== See also ==
- Fall of Kabul (2001)
