= Sheikh Ahmed Sharif Mosque =

Mosque in Shangani, Mogadishu, Somalia

- Masaajidka Shaykh Axmed Sharif

Religion
- Affiliation: Islam
- Ecclesiastical or organizational status: Mosque
- Status: Active

Location
- Location: Shangani, Mogadishu, Banaadir
- Country: Somalia

Architecture
- Type: Mosque
- Completed: 1918

The Sheikh Ahmed Sharif Mosque (Somali: Masaajidka Shaykh Axmed Sharif) is a small mosque in the historical Shangani District of Mogadishu, Banaadir, in Somalia.

== Overview ==
The current Sheikh Ahmed Sharif Mosque was built in 1918, however two previous older mosques were built on the site, on top of one another and the site could be home to Mogadishu oldest mosque. The mosque was demolished in the winter of 1985-86 was built in 1730-40 and mosque prior to that was built during the 17th century and the oldest mosque was built during the 13th century.

== Controversy ==
The Sheikh Ahmed Sharif mosque was built in 1337 AH (1918/1919 CE), after there was dispute between two local clans; the Asharaf clan and the 'Amuudi clan. The dispute between the two clans – both from Shingani district – started after the Asharaf clan had removed the Khatiib of the mosque from office – they had no right to do this as this Khatib had been chosen by elders from both clans.

The Asharaf clan then went to build the Sheikh Ahmed Sharif Mosque nearby and the dispute ended in 1339 AH (1920/1921 CE), only after there was an intervention by Carlo Avolio, a director of the Municipality at time. Along with the local clans in Mogadishu (Shingani and Hamar Weyne) and many religious leaders, there was agreement to resolve the problems of the two opposing groups. After this intervention a verdict was given that the 'Amuudi clan pray twelve Fridays in the Sheikh Ahmed Mosque and the Asharaf returned to pray in the original Friday mosque. The 'Amudi's accepted the new khatiib to be chosen from the Asharaf, and peace was made between them.

== See also ==
- Islam in Somalia
- List of mosques in Somalia
