= 'Adayga Mosque =

Mosque in Mogadishu, Banaadir, Somalia

Religion
- Affiliation: Islam
- Ecclesiastical or organizational status: Mosque
- Status: Active

Location
- Location: Hamar Weyne, Mogadishu, Banaadir
- Country: Somalia

Architecture
- Type: Mosque
- Established: c. 13th century CE
- Minaret: 1

The 'Adayga Mosque, also known as Aw Musse mosque or Haji Musse mosque, is small mosque in the historical Hamar Weyne district of Mogadishu, Banaadir, in Somalia.

== Overview ==
The historical Hamar Weyne district contains approximately 25 small mosques.

The mosque can be found in the small ancient alleyways of Hamar Weyne and can be easily missed, as it is in the midst of houses. Maria Rosario La Lomia put forward the hypothesis that the mosque could have been built in the 13th century due to the similarities of the minaret of the 'Adayga to the minaret of Jama'a Xamar Weyne.

The mosque's name comes from the fact that you'd find a Salvadora persica tree which twigs is customarily used as a toothbrush, hence the name 'Adayga, which in Somali means "whitener" or "toothbrush".

The mosque has recently been reconstructed again and has lost some of its features.

== See also ==
- Islam in Somalia
- List of mosques in Somalia
