= Sheikh Rumani Ba 'Alawi Mosque =

Mosque in Mogadishu, Somalia

- Masaajidka Shaykh Rumani Ba 'Alawi

Religion
- Affiliation: Islam
- Ecclesiastical or organizational status: Mosque
- Status: Active

Location
- Location: Hamar Weyne, Mogadishu, Banaadir
- Country: Somalia

Architecture
- Type: Mosque

The Sheikh Rumani Ba 'Alawi Mosque (Somali: Masaajidka Shaykh Rumani Ba 'Alawi; also known as Masaajidka Rumaaniga, and Masaajidka Aw Shukumaan), is small mosque in the historical Hamar Weyne district of Mogadishu, Banaadir, in Somalia.

== Overview ==
The historical Hamar Weyne district contains approximately 25 small mosques.

The mosque locally to as "Aw Shukuman" isn't an easy mosque to get to, it can only be reached through a series of long winding ancient alleyways. During a recent renovation of the mosque, two important artefacts were lost including a piece of wood with 822 AH (1419/1420 CE) inscribed, and an iron ring hanging from one of the old beams that was being replaced. The ring was similar to those found in the older homes in the neighbourhood, said to have been used to hang lanterns.

== See also ==
- Islam in Somalia
- List of mosques in Somalia
