= Jama'a Xamar Weyne, Xamar Weyne =

Mosque in Mogadishu, Somalia

Jama'a Xamar Weyne
- Jamacaha Xamar Weyne
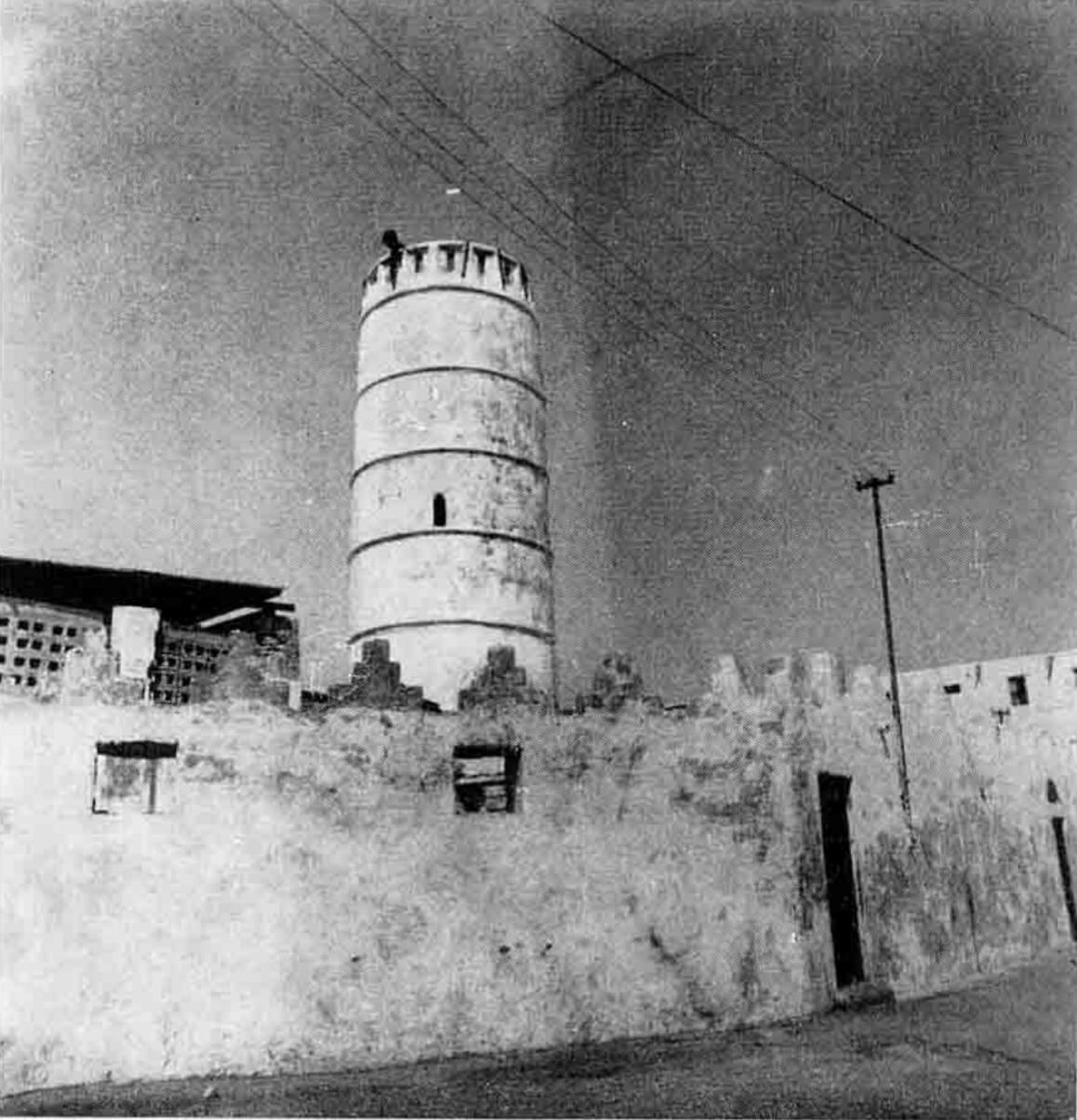
- The mosque in 1982

- Location of the mosque in Somalia

Religion
- Affiliation: Islam
- Ecclesiastical or organizational status: Friday mosque
- Status: Active

Location
- Location: Xamar Weyne, Mogadishu, Banaadir
- Country: Somalia
- Interactive map of Jama'a Xamar Weyne

Architecture
- Type: Mosque
- Completed: 636 AH (1238/1239 CE)
- Minaret: 1

The Jama'a Xamar Weyne (Somali: Jamacaha Xamar Weyne), also known as the Jama'a Hamar Weyne, is a Friday mosque, located in the historical Hamar Weyne district of Mogadishu, Banaadir, in Somalia. It is believed to be one of the oldest mosques in Mogadishu.

== Overview ==
The historical Hamar Weyne district contains approximately 25 small mosques. Mogadishu has three of the oldest mosques on the East African coast, attested to their inscriptions inside the mosques; Jamaa' Hamar Weyne, Arba’a Rukun and Fakr ad-Din, the latter two completed in 667 AH (1268/1269 CE).

The Jama’a Hamar Weyne was built in 636 AH (1238/1239 CE). Historically, the Jama’a Hamar Weyne is the most important building in the historical quarter of Xamar Weyne.

The mosque is situated approximately equidistant from the Somali Sea to the east and to the south. The ground floor of the mosque is (as estimated by eye) 2 metres (6 ft 7 in), or a little less, below the level of the ground outside and stair access is needed to descend into the main prayer hall

According to the locals the mosque was originally called Mohamed al-Awal (which translates to Mohamed the first) and was built during a period where Mogadishu was rule by Mohamed Ali, during this period the mosque Mohamed Al Tani (which translate to Mohamed the second) was built as well.

== Uways Al Barawi ==
Following Sheikh Uways Al-Barawi's return from Arabia he would visit Mogadishu and this famous story involving the Jama'a Hamarweyn and of his meeting with the Hirab Imam Mahmud with Asharaf leaders in the city recorded by Scott Reese.

When Shaykh Uways al-Qadiri came from Bagdhad he stayed in the house of Imam Mahmud Binyamin Al-Ya'qubi, who received him and honoured him, he was initiated into the Qadiriyya [by Shaykh Uways]. There was in that time in Mogadishu a heinous practice called hiku that was practiced by two groups; one was called the 'almugh and the other the shabili. Each was a powerful party being composed of people from Hamarweyn and Shangani [the two principal quarters of the town]. The members of each faction aided each other with their assets. Among them were the Asharaaf, merchants, notables, clan elders, rulers, patrons and people of the ships. All of them assisted and participated in this abominable practice until the hearts of the ulama contracted [with anguish] but they were incapable of stopping the custom ...[However], when [the participants in this practice] heard of his arrival in Mogadishu and his presence in the house of the Imam they took counsel in their meeting place and said: Tomorrow, God willing, we will meet in the Friday mosque in Shangani and face Shaykh Uways al-Qadiri so that we may repent before him this abomination. They met in front of the mosque, performed ritual ablutions and went before Shaykh Uways. They greeted each other, and their leaders said, 'O Sheikh Uways al-Qadiri, we repent of this abomination and fraud and abandon it. May God grant us victory and guidance...' And...they abandoned this repulsive practice and other abominations with his blessing.

== See also ==
- Islam in Somalia
- List of mosques in Somalia
