= Ali Jimale Mosque =

Mosque in Mogadishu, Somalia

- مسجد علي جمعالي; Masjidka Cali Jimcaale
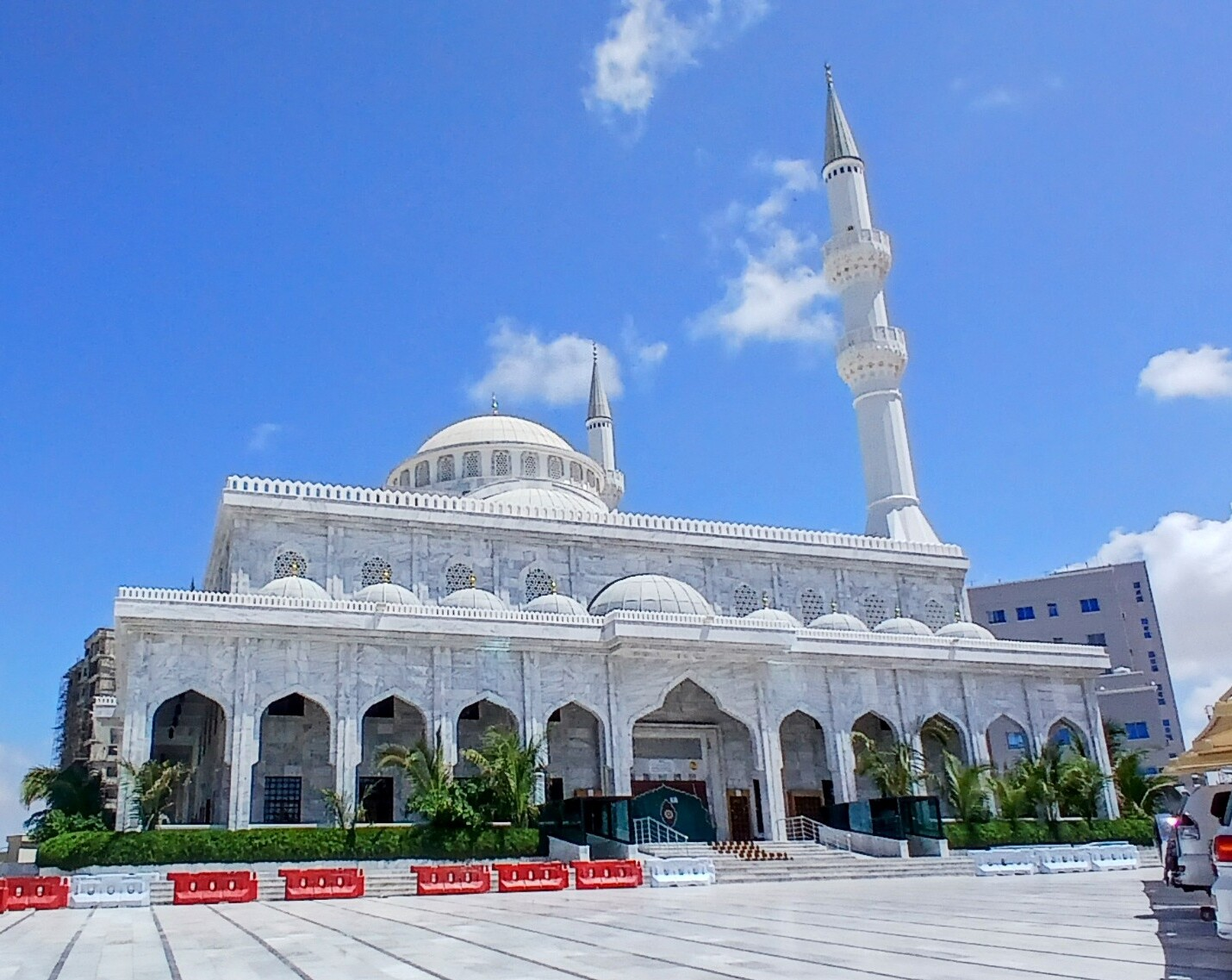

- Location within Somalia

Religion
- Affiliation: Islam
- Ecclesiastical or organizational status: Mosque
- Status: Active

Location
- Location: Mogadishu, Banaadir
- Country: Somalia
- Interactive map of Ali Jimale Mosque
- Coordinates: 2°02′09″N 45°19′51″E

Architecture
- Type: Mosque
- Completed: 2022

Specifications
- Capacity: 5,000 worshipers
- Dome: 1
- Minaret: 2

Ali Jimale Mosque (Arabic: مسجد علي جمعالي; Somali: Masjidka Cali Jimcaale) is a mosque located in Mogadishu, the capital city of Somalia. The mosque was built by Somali businessman Ahmed-Nur Ali Jimale and officially opened in 2022. It is one of the largest mosques in the city and can accommodate thousands of worshippers.

== History ==
The mosque was built as part of efforts to rebuild and develop Mogadishu after decades of conflict and war in Somalia. It was funded by businessman Ahmed-Nur Ali Jimale and named in honor of his father, Ali Jimale.

The Ali Jimale Mosque, which was opened in 2022, was designed to be modeled on the mosques of Turkey and can accommodate up to 5,000 worshipers. The Ali Jimale mosque was built near Mogadishu airport, and it cost $12 million. The land it sits on was provided by the government of Somalia.

The mosque was officially opened in July 2022 by Somali President Hassan Sheikh Mohamud, who performed the Eid Al Adha prayer alongside Prime Minister Hamza Abdi Barre, MPs, government officials, and hundreds of citizens.

== Community activities ==
The mosque regularly hosts religious gatherings and community events in Mogadishu. In 2024, the Hormuud Salaam Foundation organized its annual Ramadan Qur’an recitation competition at the mosque, bringing together students and religious scholars from across the capital.

Due to its size and central location, the mosque has also been used as a venue for community gatherings and events attended by government officials and international representatives visiting Mogadishu.

== See also ==
- Islam in Somalia
- List of mosques in Somalia
- Mogadishu
- Religion in Somalia
