= List of mosques in Somalia =

This is a list of mosques in Somalia.

== List ==
Name	Image	Location	Year (CE)	Group	Notes
Masjid al-Qiblatayn (Mosque of the two Qiblas)		Zeila, Somaliland	c. 7th century		In partial ruins. Local tradition attributes it to the 7th century, but no reliable dating has been established.
Jama'a Xamar Weyne		Hamar Weyne, Mogadishu	636 AH (1238/1239 CE)		Disputed oldest mosque in Mogadishu
Fakhr al-Din Mosque		Hamar Weyne, Mogadishu	1269	Su	Disputed oldest mosque in Mogadishu; built by Sultan Fakr ad-Din;
Mohamed Al Tani Mosque		Hamar Weyne, Mogadishu	c. 667 AH (1268/1269 CE)		
Arba'a Rukun Mosque		Shangani, Mogadishu	c. 667 AH (1268/1269 CE)		Mihrab contains an inscription commemorating the mosque's founder, Khusrau ibn Muhammed.
'Adayga Mosque		Hamar Weyne, Mogadishu	c. 13th century		
Awooto Eeday Mosque		Hamar Weyne, Mogadishu	c. 1809		Exact date of establishment is disputed.
Mosque of Islamic Solidarity		Mogadishu	1987		National mosque. Capacity of 10,000 worshipers; largest mosque in the Horn of Africa.
Ali Jimale Mosque		Mogadishu	2022		Capacity of 5,000 worshipers.
Jama'a Shingani		Shangani, Mogadishu			
Twin Mosques		Hamar Weyne, Mogadishu			Consolidation of two earlier adjacent mosques, the Aw Mukhtar Mosque and the Aw Sheikh Omar Mosque into one mosque.
Ali Matan Mosque		Hargeisa, Somaliland			Located in a four-story building
Jama Mosque		Hargeisa, Somaliland			

== See also ==
- Islam in Somalia
- List of mosques in Africa
