= Mohamed Al Tani Mosque =

Mosque in Mogadishu, Somalia

- Masaajidka Maxamed Al Taani

Religion
- Affiliation: Islam
- Ecclesiastical or organizational status: Mosque
- Status: Active

Location
- Location: Hamar Weyne, Mogadishu, Banaadir
- Country: Somalia

Architecture
- Type: Mosque
- Completed: c.667 AH (1268/1269 CE)
- Dome: 1

The Mohamed Al Tani Mosque (Somali: Masaajidka Maxamed Al Taani) is small mosque in the historical Hamar Weyne district of Mogadishu, Banaadir, in Somalia.

== Overview ==
The historical Hamar Weyne district contains approximately 25 small mosques.

Close to Jama'a Xamar Weyne, the Mohamed Al Taani Masjid is a mosque with Shirazi style writing on its Mihrab that attests to its antiquity. According to 'Aydarus Sharif 'Ali in his 1950's book, Bughyat al-amal fi tarikh al-sumal, in 604 AH (1207/1208 CE) a man named Mohamed Ali came from Egypt to Mogadishu and became the Governor of Mogadishu. During his rule the following mosques were built: Mohamed al-Awal (which translates to Mohamed the 1st) Mosque (which is the Jama'a Xamar Weyne according to the locals), Mohamed al-Taani (Mohamed the 2nd) Mosque and the last one being Arba' Rukun (of the four corners) Mosque. According to 'Aydarus, the last of these mosques was completed in 667 AH (1268/1269 CE), which was the Arba'a Rukun Mosque.

== See also ==
- Islam in Somalia
- List of mosques in Somalia
