= Religion in Somalia =

Religion in Somalia (2020)
1. Islam (99.9%)
2. Other or unaffiliated (0.10%)

Islam is the predominant religion followed in Somalia with over 99.9% of the country adhering to the religion. Sunni Islam, in the Shafi'i and Hanafi versions of Islam, is mainly followed in Somalia. Tiny minorities of Christians and traditional African religion followers do exist.

== State religion ==
=== Islam ===
Most residents of Somalia are Muslims, of which some sources state that Sunnism is the strand practised by 99% of the population, the majority following the Shafi'i school of Islamic jurisprudence is practiced while a minority belonging to the Hanafi school. A Pew Research Center survey of its Somali-majority northwestern neighbour Djibouti reported a creed breakdown of Muslims which was reported as 77% adhering to Sunnism, 8% as non-denominational Muslim, 2% as Shia, 13% percent refusing to answer, and a further report inclusive of Somali Region stipulating 2% adherence to a minority sect (e.g. Ibadism, Quranism etc.). Sufism, the mystical dimension of Islam, is also well-established, with many local jama'a (zawiya) or congregations of the various tariiqa or Sufi orders. Article 3 of the Provisional Constitution of Somalia defines Islam as the state religion of the Federal Republic of Somalia, and Islamic sharia as the basic source for national legislation. It also stipulates that no law that is inconsistent with the basic tenets of Shari'a can be enacted. Article 11 guarantees equal rights and freedom from persecution for all citizens before the law regardless of religion. Additionally, Article 17 protects freedom of religion.

== History ==
=== Bronze age ===
As the Horn was located to the east of sun-worshipping Egypt, the Horn being associated with the sunrise was then referred to as God's land during the Puntite period, arguably referring to deities such as Ra. For much of the 1st millennium BC and 1st millennium AD, a predominant religion practised by proto-Somalis as well as other Cushites and Horners was Waaq religion, although in the post-classical period, various Abrahamic faiths became increasingly prevalent.

=== Classical era ===
The native standard derivation suffixes to signify adherence to the Waaqist religion would produce Waaqnimo as the uncountable noun, and waaqyahan as the agent noun. Sources differ on whether Waaqism was henotheistic or monotheistic.

Contemporary Somali views on the ancient religion vary from aversiveness, to a perception that its monotheistic aspects ameliorated conversions to Abrahamic religions over the course of the 1st and 2nd millennium, to an intuition that some Waaqist practises linger within Somali culture in the form of syncretism.

There was a marked and pronounced difference in prehistoric forms of worship among Low-land Cushitic Horners, and that of the ancient proto-Somali Waaqists. Whereas pre-historic archeological finds such as that at Laas Geel are suggestive of panentheistic polytheism and naturalistic pantheism which included the worship of cattle, the subsequent literate period during the antiquity and the classical era wherein Waaqism became a predominant religion among the indigenous proto-Somalis appear to leave no traces of such forms of worship. As it is widely acknowledged that Abrahamic religions had reached the Horn of Africa concurrently with other parts of the world, this could suggest that Abrahamic tenets such as monotheism, non-tangible divinity, an ultimate destiny and omniscience may have influenced adaptations or configurations within Waaqism.

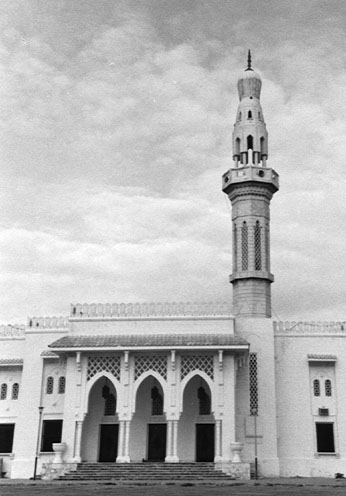
The Mosque of Islamic Solidarity in Mogadishu is the largest masjid in the Horn region.

Elements of Somali culture, which have been suspected of being a ligature or remnant of ancient Waaqism and overtly observed surviving into the 19th century include reverence-related aspects of qabiilism (associated with ancestor veneration), or in the South West state, former incorporations into dabshid, which used to include several practises associated with fire. However, some Somali clans more observant of mystical rites such as Madhiban are covert and secretive about their ancient Somali culture. Some of the religious practises dating back to the Waaq or classical era survive into the present, including mingis, a pre-islamic demon-cleansing ritual. However, mingis-practitioners in Somalia do face security risks. In July 2020, five people were killed in the country allegedly due to their practise of mingis.

=== Medieval era ===
Islam entered the region very early on, shortly after the hijra. The two-mihrab Masjid al-Qiblatayn dates to the 7th century, and is the oldest mosque in the country. In the late 9th century, Al-Yaqubi wrote that Muslims were living along the northern Somali seaboard. He also mentioned that the Adal kingdom had its capital in the city, suggesting that the Adal Sultanate with Zeila as its headquarters dates back to at least the 9th or 10th century. The city of Zeila was described as a completely Muslim city in the 14th century by Ibn Battuta. According to I.M. Lewis, the polity was governed by local dynasties, who also ruled over the similarly established Sultanate of Mogadishu in the Benadir region to the south.

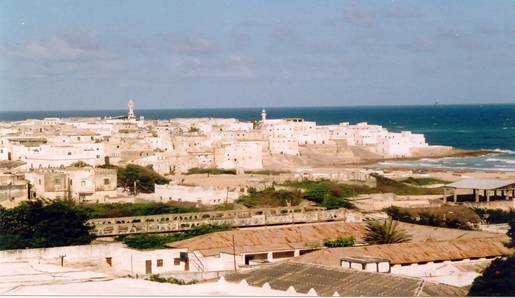
Merca is a historic Islamic center in southern Somalia.

There are two theories about when Somalis began adopting Islam. One states that Islam probably arrived in Somalia in the 7th century when followers of Muhammad came over to escape persecution from the Quraysh tribe in Mecca. An alternate theory states that Islam was brought to the coastal settlements of Somalia between the 7th and the 10th century by seafaring Arab and Persian merchants. The Sunni-Shia split within Islam may have occurred before Islam became widespread among Somalis, today Sunnis constitute the overwhelming majority. Somali Sufi religious orders (tariqa) – the Qadiriyya, the Ahmadiya and the Salihiyya – in the form of Muslim brotherhoods have played a major role in Somali Islam and the modern era history of Somalia.

Of the three orders, the less strict Qaadiriya tariqa is the oldest, and it is the sect to which most Somalis belonged. The Qaadiriya order is named after Shaikh Muhiuddin Abdul Qadir Gilani of Baghdad. I. M. Lewis states that Qaadiriya has a high reputation for maintaining a higher standard of Islamic instruction than its rivals.

Ahmadiyah and its sub-sect Salihiyyah preached a puritanical form of Islam, and have rejected the popular Sufi practice of tawassul (visiting the tombs of saints to ask mediation). B. G. Martin states that these two orders shared some of the views of the Wahhabis of Arabia. The religious differences between Qaadiriya and Salihiyya were controversial, as Salihis continued to oppose the Qadiris' practice of tawassul, and claimed the act to be invalid and improper religious activity.

The Ahmadiya has the smallest number of adherents of the three orders.

Qur'anic schools (also known as dugsi) remain the basic system of traditional religious instruction in Somalia. It is delivered in Arabic. They provide Islamic education for children. According to the UNICEF, the dugsi system, where the content is based on the Quran, teaches the greatest number of students and enjoys high parental support, is oftentimes the only system accessible to nomadic Somalis as compared to urban areas. A study from 1993 found that "unlike in primary schools where gender disparity is enormous, around 40 per cent of Qur'anic school pupils are girls; but the teaching staff have minimum or no qualification necessary to ensure intellectual development of children." To address these concerns, the Somali government subsequently established the Ministry of Endowment and Islamic Affairs, under which Qur'anic education is now regulated.

The Somali community has produced important Muslim figures over the centuries, many of whom have significantly shaped the course of Islamic learning and practice in the Horn of Africa.

== Minorities ==
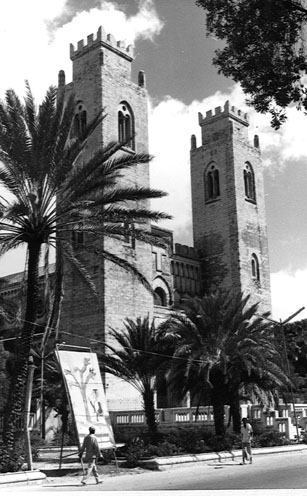
The Mogadishu Cathedral, the former seat of the Roman Catholic Diocese of Mogadiscio

=== Christianity ===
Christianity came to coastal areas of the Somalia in 7th century.

In 1913, during the early part of the colonial era, there were virtually no Christians in the Somali territories, with only about 100–200 followers coming from the schools and orphanages of the few Catholic missions in the British Somaliland protectorate. There were also no known Catholic missions in Italian Somaliland during the same period. The Cathedral of Mogadishu was largely constructed between 1925 and 1928 by the Consolata Missionaries and the governor Cesare Maria De Vecchi; it was designed by architect Antonio Vandone. In the 1970s, during the reign of Somalia's then Marxist government, church-run schools were closed and missionaries sent home. There has been no archbishop in the country since 1989, and the cathedral in Mogadishu was severely damaged during the civil war.

As of 2021, there are at least some known local Christians in Somaliland.

In August 2025, International Christian Concern reported that a video posted on TikTok by a Somali about one of its articles went viral (the article claims that there are more than 1,500 Christians in Somalia, many of them converts from Islam), with many people posting extremely violent comments.

According to estimates of the Diocese of Mogadishu (the territory of which coincides with the country) there were only about 100 official Catholic practitioners in Somalia in 2004.

=== Traditional Faith ===
According to the Pew Research Center, less than 0.01% of Somalia's population in 2010 were adherents of traditional or folk religions. These mainly consisted of some non-Somali ethnic minority groups in the southern parts of the country, who practice animism. In the case of the Bantu, these religious traditions were inherited from their ancestors in Southeast Africa, and include the practice of possession dances and the use of magic and curses. Waaqism was an ancient traditional religion practised by many Horners, in particular by Cushites. As there has not been a comprehensive survey, it is unclear to what extent Somali Waaqists exist in the contemporary period.

=== Other ===
According to the Pew Research Center, less than 0.01% of Somalia's population in 2010 were adherents of Hinduism, Buddhism, or unaffiliated with any religion. One correspondent has discussed how irreligiosity is an increasing phenomenon among Somalis. Although the bulk of this sentiment comes from Somalis in the diaspora, there are also many Somalis from their home country, Somalia, who discuss their disbelief in religion, although covertly. These discussions primarily revolve around the existence of God. It has been theorized that increased apostasy, irreligiosity and detachment from religion stems from misgivings and despair at the existence of radical Salafist groups such as Daa'ish and Shabab.

== Freedom of religion ==
The provisional constitution of Somalia provides for the right of individuals to practice their religion, makes Islam the state religion, prohibits the propagation of any religion other than Islam (although it does not explicitly ban conversion), and stipulates all laws must comply with the general principles of Muslim religious law. No exemptions from application of sharia legal principles exist for non-Muslims. The federal government of Somalia had limited ability to implement its laws beyond greater Mogadishu; most other areas of Somalia were outside its control. The provisional constitution requires the president, but not other office holders, to be Muslim. There are no public places of worship for non-Muslims in the country, outside of the international airport.

Due to the Somali Civil War, the enforcement of laws pertaining to religion by the various autonomous governments in the region is inconsistent. Generally, the judiciary in most areas relies on xeer (traditional and customary law), sharia, and the penal code.

In 2023, the country was scored zero out of 4 for religious freedom. In the same year, the country was ranked as the second worst place in the world to be a Christian, just behind North Korea.

=== Societal attitudes ===
There is a strong societal pressure to adhere to Sunni traditions. Conversion from Islam to another religion has been socially unacceptable in all areas of Somalia. According to the federal Ministry of Religious Affairs, more than 99 percent of the population is Sunni Muslim. In 2022, members of other religious groups combined constitute less than 1 percent of the population and include a small Christian community, and an unknown number of Shia Muslims.

== See also ==
- Christianity in Somalia
- Islam in Somalia
- Demographics of Somalia

== Bibliography ==
- Abdurahman, Abdullahi (2017-09-17). Recovering the Somali State: The Role of Islam, Islamism and Transitional Justice. Adonis and Abbey Publishers. ISBN 978-1-909112-62-9.
