= Twin Mosques =

Mosque in Mogadishu, Somalia

- Masaajidka Mataanaha

Religion
- Affiliation: Islam
- Ecclesiastical or organizational status: Mosque
- Status: Active

Location
- Location: Hamar Weyne, Mogadishu, Banaadir
- Country: Somalia

Architecture
- Type: Mosque

The Twin Mosques (Somali: Masaajidka Mataanaha), formerly known as the Aw Mukhtar Mosque and as the Aw Sheikh Omar Mosque, is a large consolidated mosque, located in the historical Hamar Weyne district of Mogadishu, Banaadir in Somalia.

== Overview ==
The historical Hamar Weyne district contains approximately 25 small mosques.

The Twin Mosques, up until recently, comprised two separate mosques: the Aw Muqtaar Mosque and the Aw Sheikh Omar Mosque. The Aw Muqtaar Mosque was rumoured to have existed around 700 years ago, according to local elders. The Aw Sheikh Omar Mosque was a more recently established mosque and existed for approximately 200 years, prior to consolidation of the two mosques.

The two mosques had features that may be unique to the Islamic world where they both shared the same sahn and the same wudu for ritual ablution. Prior to consolidation, the mosques had two separate imams along with two prayer rooms facing each other. Prayers would be done concurrently.

== See also ==
- Islam in Somalia
- List of mosques in Somalia
