= Awooto Eeday Mosque =

Mosque in Mogadishu, Somalia

Religion
- Affiliation: Islam
- Ecclesiastical or organizational status: Mosque
- Status: Active

Location
- Location: Hamar Weyne, Mogadishu
- Country: Somalia

Architecture
- Type: Mosque
- Founder: Awooto Eeday
- Completed: 1223 AH (1808/1809 CE)

The Awooto Eeday Mosque is small mosque in the historical Hamar Weyne district of Mogadishu, Banaadir, in Somalia.

== Overview ==
The historical Hamar Weyne district contains approximately 25 small mosques.

The mosque is said to have been built with the money of a pious woman who was known as Awooto Eeday (Awooto which means grandmother in the local dialect).

Above the mihrab of this mosque there's a plate with inscriptions which bears 1223 AH (1808/1809 CE), according to Prof. Sharif Abdalla. However, according Maria Roasrio La Lomia, the mosque could be a lot older and that date could reflect the renovation of an older mosque. Awooto Eeday ("Grandmother Eeday‟) mosque is the neighbourhood mosque for the Shanshiyo. It was here that Sheikh Abba spent much of his day in the last quarter century, for prayer, teaching his students, and talking with people. According to his son 'Abdirahman, the mosque was built by an old woman of the Reer Sheikh Muuminow, one of the oldest Banaadiri clan and is on the site of yet an older mosque.

== See also ==
- Islam in Somalia
- List of mosques in Somalia
