= Abdilqadir Ali Omar =

Abdulqadir Ali Omar

Minister of Interior Affairs of Somalia
- In office 27 February 2009 – 20 January 2011
- Prime Minister: Omar Abdirashid Ali Sharmarke
- Succeeded by: Abdi Shakur Hasan

2nd Deputy Chairman of Islamic Courts Union
- In office 26 June 2006 – 20 February 2007
- Preceded by: Established
- Succeeded by: Abolished

Member of Somali Parliament
- Incumbent
- Assumed office 3 February 2009

Personal details
- Born: Adado, Galgaduud, Somalia
- Party: Independent

Abdilqadir Ali Omar (Somali: Cabdiqadir Cali Cumar, Arabic: عبد القادر علي عمر) is a Somali politician and scholar who served as vice chairman of the Islamic Courts Union. Abdilqadir remained in Somalia during the Ethiopian military occupation to manage ICU insurgents. He later served as Minister of Interior of the Transitional Federal Government.

Omar, born in the Adado district of the Galgaduud region in central Somalia, grew up in Mogadishu, where he completed his secondary education. He pursued studies in Islamic education under prominent Islamic scholars. In 2004, he became the head of one of the constituent courts of the Islamic Courts Union and was later appointed vice-chairman of the organization. He also led the resistance against the Ethiopian invasion of Somalia.

In March 2009, Omar was wounded in a bombing carried out by Al-Shabaab while serving as TFG Minister of Interior Affairs.
