= Jama'a Shingani, Shingani =

Mosque in Mogadishu, Somalia

Jama'a Shingani
- Jamacaha Shingani
- Location within Somalia

Religion
- Affiliation: Islam
- Ecclesiastical or organizational status: Friday mosque

Location
- Location: Shangani District, Mogadishu, Banaadir
- Country: Somalia
- Interactive map of Jama'a Shingani
- Coordinates: 2°2′00″N 45°20′30″E

Architecture
- Type: Mosque

The Jama'a Shingani (Somali: Jamacaha Shingani) is a Friday mosque located in the Shangani District of Mogadishu, Banaadir, in Somalia. The mosque is one of the oldest mosques in Mogadishu and is one of the most important buildings in Shangani.

== See also ==
- Islam in Somalia
- List of mosques in Somalia
