= Arba'a Rukun Mosque =

Mosque in Mogadishu, Somalia

- أربع ركون
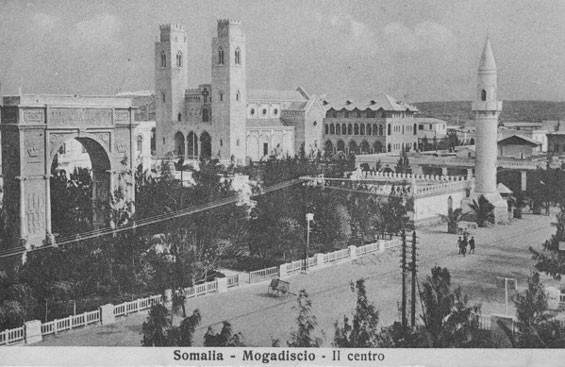

- Location within Somalia

Religion
- Affiliation: Islam
- Ecclesiastical or organizational status: Mosque
- Status: Active

Location
- Location: Shangani District, Mogadishu, Banaadir
- Country: Somalia
- Interactive map of Arba'a Rukun Mosque
- Coordinates: 2°02′06″N 45°20′33″E

Architecture
- Type: Mosque
- Founder: Khusra ibn Mubarak al-Shirazi
- Completed: c. 667 AH (1268/1269 CE)

Specifications
- Dome: 1
- Minaret: 2

The Arba'a Rukun Mosque (Arabic: أربع ركون), also known as Arba Rucun, is a mosque in the Shangani medieval district of Mogadishu, Banaadir, Somalia.

== Overview ==
Built in c. 667 AH (1268/1269 CE), concurrently with the Fakr ad-Din Mosque, the Arba'a Rukun Mosque is one of the oldest Islamic places of worship in Mogadishu. The mihrab contains an inscription dated from the same year, which commemorates the name of the mosque's founder, Khusra ibn Mubarak al-Shirazi (Khusrau ibn Muhammed).

== See also ==
- Islam in Somalia
- List of mosques in Somalia
