= Islamic Courts Union =

Somali legal and political organization (2000–2009)

Islamic Courts Union Midowga Maxkamadaha Islaamiga (Somali) اتحاد المحاكم الإسلامية (Arabic)
- Leader: Sharif Sheikh Ahmed
- Governing body: Islamic Courts Supreme Council
- Founded: 2000
- Dissolved: 2007–2009
- Preceded by: Independent Sharia courts
- Merged into: Alliance for the Re-liberation of Somalia
- Succeeded by: Al-Shabaab (2007–present); Jabhatul Islamiya (2007–2009); TFG (2009–2012); Hizbul Islam (2009–2014)
- Headquarters: Mogadishu
- Ideology: Islamism
- Religion: Sunni Islam

Party flag

Website
- almaxaakim.com

The Islamic Courts Union (Somali: Midowga Maxkamadaha Islaamiga) was a legal and political organization founded by Mogadishu-based Sharia courts during the early 2000s to combat the lawlessness stemming from the Somali Civil War. By mid-to-late 2006, the Islamic Courts had expanded their influence to become the de facto government in most of southern and central Somalia, succeeding in creating the first semblance of a state since 1991.

Following the collapse of the Somali Democratic Republic in early 1991, a new phenomenon emerged – the establishment of Sharia courts to impose law and order on the volatile neighborhoods of Mogadishu. These independent courts found their existence threatened by warlords, necessitating cooperation which resulted in their unification by 2000. The Islamic Courts Union (ICU) was a broad-based organization comprising various courts with diverse goals, from national political ambitions to local dispute resolution and propagation of Islam. Due to Islam's central role in Somali society, the initiative gained significant popularity and acceptance, along with substantial financial support from the Somali business community, as it originated from the grassroots level, built legitimacy through religious solidarity, addressed local security concerns, and demonstrated a commitment to restoring public order.

During the summer of 2006, the ICU defeated a warlord alliance backed by the American Central Intelligence Agency and became the first entity to consolidate control over all of Mogadishu since the collapse of the state, propelling the organization onto the international stage. The ICU coalesced into a government after taking control of the capital and began reconstituting the Somali state. This period is widely regarded as Somalia's most stable and productive since the civil war began. Mogadishu residents moved freely for the first time in years as the security situation stabilized, the international airport and seaport reopened after more than a decade, large-scale debris cleanup began, and the presence of weapons on the streets significantly decreased. The organization began pacifying large swathes of territory outside of the capital and expanding its control over much of Somalia.

Six months into their governance, the ICU was toppled during the final days of 2006 by a full scale Ethiopian invasion of Somalia, supported by the United States. Much of the organizational structure of the ICU disintegrated early on in 2007 due to the invasion as the ENDF/US forces brought the Transitional Federal Government (TFG) to power. Following the collapse of the ICU's rule, much of the ICU's high ranking leadership sought refuge in Eritrea. In the insurgency that followed, a youth faction within the military wing of the Islamic Courts, Al-Shabaab, stayed behind and broke away, initially empowering themselves as a popular resistance movement against the occupation. Throughout 2007 and 2008, ICU forces participated in the insurgency against Ethiopian troops occupying Somalia. Several high-ranking members of the Islamic Courts later founded the Alliance for the Re-liberation of Somalia (ARS) in late 2007, which would merge with the TFG in late 2008. Former chairman of the ICU Sharif Ahmed became president of Somalia in 2009, replacing the TFG with the Federal Government of Somalia. In 2012, the country adopted a new constitution that declared Somalia an Islamic state with Sharia as its primary source of law.

== Origins ==
=== Historical background ===
Islamic law (Sharia) was used during the reign of the Somali Ajuran Sultanate. After existing for about 300 years, the Ajuran Sultanate declined during the 17th century after abandoning Sharia and becoming oppressive. During the 19th century, before the Scramble for Africa had arrived to Somali territories, Sharia courts headed by qadis (Islamic judges) operated all along the coast.

During 1990, just before the full outbreak of the Somali Civil War, a group of sixty highly prominent members of Somali society under the banner of Islamic Call published a public manifesto addressed to President Mohammed Siad Barre. The manifesto warned that he had committed serious transgressions against the laws of Islam and unsuccessfully called on Barre to step down and peacefully transition power.

=== First Sharia Courts ===
The first appearance of Sharia courts to build local stability began immediately after the Somali state completely collapsed in January 1991. In the weeks following the toppling of the Somali Democratic Republic, militias that had routed the government began hunting down civilians based on their clan identity. Around this time, several well-known Somali scholars such as Sheikh Sharif Sharafow, Sheikh Ibrahim Suley and Sheikh Mohamed Moallin Hassan established Sharia courts to rescue civilians from these attacks and to address the general rising lawlessness. The first Shari'a courts were started on a small local neighborhood level by Somali religious leaders as a way to address issues in their communities. Most problems they dealt with were related to petty crimes and family disputes. In the chaotic political context of war torn Mogadishu the religious leaders were considered by most Somalis as some of the only people who could be trusted to impartially resolve disputes. Importantly, the courts also did not take positions on national-political or clan affairs, lending significant credence to their purported impartiality.

Around the same time as the creation of the Mogadishu courts, Sheikh Mohamed Haji Yusuf and Sheikh Mohamud A. Nur established a new Islamic court in the Luuq District of Gedo region during 1992. The Gedo court had more success than its counterparts in Mogadishu. Order and security was established throughout Luuq district and consequently it became the safest area in Somalia during much of the 1990s. The court later dissolved in 1997 when the Somali National Front and Ethiopian military collaborated to topple it. During 1993, new courts emulating the Luuq judiciary opened in Mogadishu. The United Nations Operation in Somalia (UNOSOM) that operated during the mid-1990s opposed the courts.

==== The Sheikh Ali–Dhere court ====
In 1994, the opening of a court in Mogadishu run by a Sheikh named Ali Dheere had a significant impact on the expansion of the Sharia courts system in the city. Dheere, who lived in one of the most dangerous regions of war-torn Mogadishu, became exhausted with the growing anarchy. He decided to put his religious training to use by setting up the first major Sharia court in Somalia. The infamous "Siisii Street" ran through his community and became notorious for its dangerous reputation.

Siraadka Qiyaama iyo Siisii Allow na mooti (Translation: "Oh god save me from the troubles that are associated with the day of judgement and those of Siisii Street")

— A popular saying in war torn Mogadishu prior to the establishment of Sheikh Ali Dheeres court

Primarily his court focused on aiding merchants and store owners resolve their disputes, helping people arrange legal agreements for large purchases like homes, and trying people for crimes. Local scholars, elders, businessmen and political leaders cooperated with Dheere in a bid to end the spiraling chaos in their community. Soon Ali Dheere had a staff that apprehended bandits and thieves in the area to bring them to be put on trial. His success in bringing order to his neighborhood in Mogadishu became well known throughout the city and led to the establishment of other copycat Sharia courts. The court did not shy away from strict punishments and even carried out executions. Soon word began rapidly spreading that law and order was being established in Dheeres sector of the city and the crime rate in the area subsequently dropped dramatically. Supported financially by local business men, vehicles dispatched from Siisii court began patrolling the main roads in north Mogadishu and day-to-day civilian activity in that part of the city began resuming as the security situation stabilized.

=== Rise of the Mogadishu Islamic Courts ===
In 1994 and 1995, other Sharia courthouses began opening up in northern Mogadishu, operating independently in their own self contained jurisdictions in the city. They also began spreading to the Hiiraan region, though did not survive in the long term due to the intransigence of warlords. During these early years, the courts began gaining considerable support for deploying security forces to protect schools and hospitals from warlord incursions and predatory bandits. Before the establishment of these courts, acts of rape had become commonplace in north Mogadishu since 1991. The establishment of the judiciary made a considerable impact on the security situation as the courts made a point of handing out the capital punishment of stoning to rapists. By 1997, there had been seven cases of execution by stoning in Somalia. It has been noted that suppression of war time sexual violence was a major underlying factor in Somali women's support for the Islamic Courts.

The first court did not start in southern Mogadishu until after 1996, as the de facto ruler of the territory, General Mohammed Farah Aidid and his faction the Somali National Alliance opposed the Islamic courts as it was viewed a threat to his hold on power, and no progress occurred until after Aidids death. Ali Mahdi, Aidids prime rival controlling the northern part of the city, issued a decree to dismantle Ali Dheere's Court after perceiving the Sheikhs rising popularity as a threat to his own authority. As the years passed, with nothing but warlords offering to replace its authority, the rule of the sharia courts began to cement.

By 1999, the Islamic courts had jurisdiction had expanded their influence over a large part of south Mogadishu as well. The courts were not an organized movement or a government, but represented the closest thing Somalia had to either. Their influence was enhanced by financial donors abroad who sought to bring any semblance of stability to the country. While some Somalis voiced disapproval of the more fundamentalist ways of the original Sharia courts, it was noted that most felt that they were well organized and effective civil administrators.

== Consolidation of Islamic Courts ==
During April 1999, several Sharia courts united for the first time, seizing control of Mogadishu's Bakaara Market from local warlords. By the end of the year, their coordinated efforts had begun to weaken the warlords' dominance in the capital. By mid-1999, Islamic Courts operating in the central regions were securing roads from Galkayo to Guriel and providing the only functioning detention and prison services in much of southern Somalia. By the late 1990s, Mogadishu experienced growing optimism as the Islamic Courts, in collaboration with the business community, dismantled hundreds of illegal checkpoints and arrested thousands of militia members operating them. The chairman of the courts declared that these were the first step towards establishing an Islamic government in Somalia.

At a June 1999 meeting, several Islamic Courts unanimously declared their refusal to participate in any "clannish armed confrontations." They appealed to warlord Hussein Aidid of the Somali National Alliance and the Rahanweyn Resistance Army, who were fighting in the Bay region at the time, to resolve their conflict peacefully through dialogue. The courts opposed Aidid's attempts to capture Bay and Bakool, asserting that the nation's current problems could only be solved through the implementation of Sharia.

=== Formation of Courts Council (2000) ===
During 2000, having liberated a significant portion of the city from warlord control, eleven of the individual Sharia courts amalgamated to establish the Islamic Courts Council, which also led to the unification of their militias into a single combat force. This development marked a pivotal moment in the civil war, as it signified the emergence of the first major non-warlord affiliated Somali armed force in the city. A 'Shari’ah Implementation Council' was created that same year, which began to consolidate resources and power on the basis of Islamic doctrine instead of clannism. Professor Mark Fathi Massoud draws a comparison between the Somalis' late 1990s and early 2000s turn towards local religious courts for self-governance and the historical patterns observed in early democratic Western Europe and colonial North America. In both cases, he argues the establishment of courts and the invocation of the divine played crucial roles in state-building. Massoud highlights that the Sharia courts' use of religion to foster stability has parallels with those courts that significantly influenced the nascent phases of democratic states. During August 2000, Islamic Courts fighters were operating in the Banaadiir and Lower Shabelle regions. From Mogadishu south down to the port city of Baraawe, courts personnel were present attempting to establish security.

=== Transitional National Government merger (2000–2004) ===
When the Transitional National Government of Somalia (TNG) was established in Djibouti during the spring of 2000, the momentum of the Islamic Courts was slowed as they opted to back the first attempt since the collapse of the state at forming a government. The chairman of the Islamic Courts was elected as a member of the Transitional National Assembly. Openly threatened by warlords, the Courts protected the President Abdiqasim Salad Hassan during his return to the capital in August 2000, and soon handed over their heavy weaponry to the newly formed TNG. During 2001 the TNG gradually absorbed the Islamic courts and their militia, ceasing function by the years end.

The expansion of the Islamic Courts resumed in 2004 following the TNG's failure and after Sharif Sheikh Ahmed was elected as chairman of the Islamic Courts. The previous year Ahmed had been a school teacher that had become frustrated with the return of insecurity in north Mogadishu and successfully pushed to rejuvenate the Islamic Courts system in the region. Following the failure of the TNG established in 2000, the Transitional Federal Government (TFG) led by Abdullahi Yusuf was formed in 2004. Previously aligned closely with Ethiopia, Yusuf's leadership received significant support from the Ethiopian government. This support was believed to be pivotal in his electoral victory for the TFG leadership in an election held in Kenya. Before becoming president of the TFG during 2004, Abdullahi Yusuf was a member of an Ethiopian-backed coalition of warlords that had undermined the Transitional National Government formed in 2000 that the Islamic Courts had supported. Professor Jude Cocodia, a political science scholar from Niger Delta University, notes that Ethiopia's deep involvement in the formation of the TFG led many Somalis to view the government as inauthentic and essentially a puppet regime under Ethiopian influence. This sentiment was further amplified by historical events, such as the 1982 Border War, during which Yusuf led the Somali Salvation Democratic Front (SSDF) and collaborated with invading Ethiopian forces.

The TFG operated entirely outside of Somalia due to instability in Mogadishu and consequently was criticized by Somali citizens and international community. At the time the TFG was only recognized by Kenya and Ethiopia, as the European Union, the United States and other members of the international community refused to fully recognize the TFG's legitimacy until it operated from Mogadishu. To counter this, the TFG moved into Somalia for the first time in 2005, eventually setting up its headquarters south west of Mogadishu in Baidoa.

== Rise of Islamic Courts Union ==
As the courts started to unify in the early 2000s, tensions further escalated with the warlords who were becoming increasingly marginalized. The ascendance of an Islamist political force in Somalia during this period was perceived as a threat to Western strategic interests in the Horn of Africa. Within the framework of the war on terror, the U.S. government also perceived the rise of an Islamic movement in Somalia as a potential terror risk. From 2003 onwards, the Central Intelligence Agency (CIA) initiated covert operations against the Islamic Courts Union, aiming to depose them from power.

Prior to 2006, the ICU effectively operated as a loose federation of regional judiciary systems. The courts had developed their own police detachments, prison system, and increasingly carried out joint military operations with each other. Though often compared to the Taliban during its rise, the ICU did not adopt similar practices or tendencies such as the strict/rigid enforcement of Sharia or the prohibition of women's employment. According to a report by Ted Dagne, an Africa Research Specialist for the Congressional Research Service,

"...the leadership [of the ICU] was often referred to as jihadist, extremist, and at times terrorist by some observers without much evidence to support the allegations. For example, the assessment of the Islamic Courts by U.S. officials was that less than 5% of the Islamic Courts leadership can be considered extremist, according to a senior State Department official."

=== CIA intervention ===
During 2003, the American Central Intelligence Agency began covert operations targeting the Courts. The Bush administration had become increasingly concerned with the growing power of the Islamic Courts Union, and feared that they would make Somalia a haven for Al-Qaeda to plan attacks from, like in Afghanistan. American support for the warlords extended to the point where, on numerous occasions, Nairobi-based CIA officers landed on warlord-controlled airstrips in Mogadishu with large amounts of money for distribution to Somali militias. According to John Prendergast, CIA-operated flights into Somalia had been bringing in $100,000 to US$150,000 per month for the warlords and he further claimed that the flights remained in Somalia for the day so that CIA agents can confer with them. The CIA also gave its newfound allies surveillance equipment for "tracking al Qaeda suspects". According to multiple U.S. officials, the decision to use the warlords as proxies was born from fears of once again committing large numbers of American soldiers to Somalia following the disastrous 1993 Battle of Mogadishu. Many of the warlords the Americans funded to fight the Islamic Courts Union were many of the same ones that had fought directly against the Americans in Mogadishu during UNOSOM II in 1993.

The ICU did not maintain a significant fighting force as the organization was overwhelmingly focused on providing legal and social services. The deficiency in firepower was especially pronounced in heavy weaponry. According to senior Islamic court officials the union only possessed a total of four technical improvised fighting vehicles when the 2006 Battle of Mogadishu against the Somali warlord alliance broke out.

=== Warlord conflict and CIA escalation ===
Beginning in 2005 Mogadishu was hit by a significant wave of unexplained assassinations and disappearances. The Islamic Courts claimed that covert US government operations and warlords were targeting high ranking ICU officials. According to C. Barnes & H. Hassan, "It was in this context that a military force known as Al-Shabaab (‘the Youth’) emerged, related to but seemingly autonomous of the broad based Courts movement." At the time it was widely believed in Mogadishu that Somali warlords were cooperating with U.S. intelligence agents carry out kidnappings. Throughout Somalia, religious authorities who were collaborating with the ICU began being kidnapped, pushing the organization to adopt a more confrontational stance against the warlords. The CIA backed warlords had a notorious pattern of seizing innocent clerics with little or no intelligence value, which greatly fed into the already existing perception among Somalis that the Americans and the warlords were waging a war against Islam under the guise of the war on terrorism.

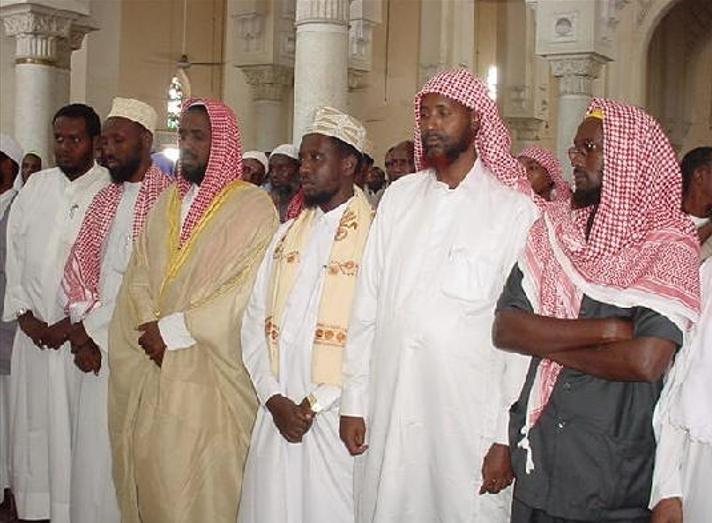
High ranking ICU figures Sheikh Sharif, Sheikh Abdiqadir Ali, Sheikh Abdirahman Janaqow & Abdullahi Maalim Ali (on far right) partaking in Eid-ul Fitr prayer at the Mosque of Islamic Solidarity

During 2006, at the suggestion of the Central Intelligence Agency (CIA), anti-ICU warlords united under the banner of the Alliance for the Restoration of Peace and Counter-Terrorism (ARPCT). The decision to support these warlords generated dissent within the CIA, the US State Department, and European states. Many officials expressed apprehensions that this backing could lead to a major anti-American backlash in Somalia and greatly empower Islamist factions. As fighting for the city was ongoing in March 2006, the courts succeeded in seizing critical roads and infrastructure from the ARPCT. Prominent locals had urged the ICU and the warlord alliance to agree to a ceasefire to prevent bloodshed in Mogadishu. The ICU pledged to abide by a ceasefire, but mediators between the two organizations reported that the warlord alliance had delayed and refused to commit themselves. The Americans approved greater funding for the Somali warlords and further encourage them to counter the ICU, a decision made by top officials in Washington which was later reaffirmed by the U.S. National security council during meeting about Somalia in March 2006. At the time of the meeting there was fierce fighting in between the warlords and the Islamic Courts around Mogadishu, and the decision was taken to make counter-terrorism the top policy priority for Somalia.

A public uprising occurred in support of the Courts against the warlord alliance. The ICU enjoyed widespread support from Mogadishu citizens and business community against the warlords, greatly aiding its ability to seize and control large swathes of the city. The broad support of Somali women for the union played a significant role in the organizations ability to maintain combat operations against the warlords. In the view of Mary Harper, a journalist with BBC Africa, the Islamic Courts Union was in reality more of a loose federation and only began to unite into a homogeneous body with a clear authority when its existence was threatened by the ARPCT. The TFG, being both in contention with the ICU and backed by the United States, openly opposed the Americans operation to fund the warlords. Despite significant opposition in the government, several members of the CIA backed warlord alliance were holding senior posts within the TFG while fighting against the ICU was ongoing.

By April 2006 much of Mogadishu had fallen under the control of the ICU after clashes with the warlord alliance. The cities air and seaports came under the organizations direct control for the first time. In May they seized the very building where the warlord alliance had been founded and established an Islamic Court in its place. Two of the defeated warlords allegedly fled to an American naval vessel off the Somali coast according to witnesses in Mogadishu.

=== Defeat of the warlord alliance and seizure of Mogadishu ===
On 5 June 2006, the Islamic Courts Union decisively defeated the warlord alliance in the Second Battle of Mogadishu, gained total authority over the capital and proceeded to establish a 65-mile radius of control around the city. This was a seminal moment in modern Somali history, as the ICU was now the first group to have consolidated control over all of Mogadishu since the collapse of the Somali state. According to Chatham House, "The Courts achieved the unthinkable, uniting Mogadishu for the first time in 16 years, and re-establishing peace and security". The Alliance for the Restoration of Peace and Counter-Terrorism soon collapsed, with the majority of its commanders publicly resigning or expressing support for the ICU. BBC News reported that the ICU had emerged as Somalia's strongest and most popular faction.

The Union of Islamic Courts was established to ensure that Somali people suffering for 15 years would gain peace and full justice and freedom from the anarchic rule of warlords who refuted their people to no direction.

— An interview featured in the BBC Online Somali section in June 2006 with Sharif Sheikh Ahmed

The leaders of the ICU repeatedly professed that they intended to negotiate with the Transitional Federal Government In Baidoa so that it could move into Mogadishu and reunite Somalia. Several days after the city came under ICU control, US State Department spokesman Sean McCormack noted that goal of the union was to "...lay the foundations for some institutions in Somalia that might form the basis for a better and more peaceful, secure Somalia where the rule of law is important." In mid-June, ICU leaders sent a cable to Washington stating that the courts had no interest in being enemies with the United States. ICU delegations later travelled to the United Kingdom raise funds from the Somali diaspora and held meetings with British government officials from the Foreign Office. The defeat of the warlords propelled the Islamic Courts Union onto the national stage and the pacification of Mogadishu during mid-2006 saw the ICU coalesce into a government in response to the void left by the corrupt and inept TFG.

== Governance ==
Over the ensuing months, the eleven amalgamated Islamic Courts initiated a drive to establish stability in Mogadishu and the territories coming under its control. This period of the Somali Civil War, referred to as a 'Golden era' of Somali politics by top UN officials, saw the ICU undertake significant reformative and security measures. The organization was able to build legitimacy through religious solidarity, establishing security and demonstrating a commitment to rebuilding public order. The rule of the Courts was regarded by some observers as the most successful experiment at pacifying the war torn capital and at re-establishing order over large swathes of Somalia. In the view of political scientist Alexandra Magnólia Dias, the Courts "seemed to be the only viable alternative with regard to a political state building project". For many Somalis, the Islamic Courts Union rekindled aspirations for a return to the legacy of historic Islamic empires in the Horn of Africa, such as the Sultanate's of Adal and Ifat.

26 June 2006, a 90-member Shura (consultative) council, chaired by Hassan Dahir Aweys, was established and operated under an executive committee led by Sharif Ahmed. Vice chairman Abdilqadir Ali Omar stated that the creation of the Shura council was the first step toward restoring order. He added that a broader council, with representatives from all sectors of society, was expected to be formed in the near future. The Islamic Courts Union, in effect, became one of the first post-1991 Somali armed organizations to seriously mobilize a support base across tribal lines and diverse interests, which some scholars have deemed notable given historic rivalries among some of the clans from which it recruited from.

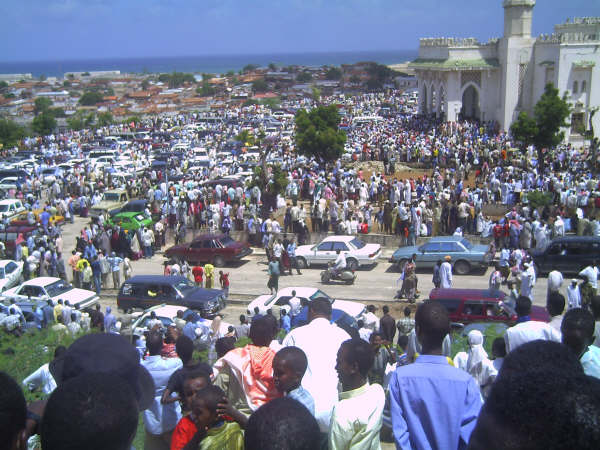
Crowds gather for the reopening of the Mosque of Islamic Solidarity (Masjidka Isbahaysiga) in Mogadishu on 18 August 2006

=== Security and law ===
After taking control of Mogadishu, the ICU revived 16 previously defunct police stations, deploying nearly 600 personnel and dozens of vehicles to bolster law enforcement. This led to a sharp drop in banditry within days, as thieves avoided areas patrolled by court forces. Community reintegration programs were offered to former militiamen, and formal military and police training was introduced to restructure the security wing. Training camps were established that offered rehabilitation and Islamic education to former members of warlord militias. The open possession of firearms was banned unless registered with a court, and foreign visitors were required to provide two weeks' notice for security purposes. Various Sufi tariqas and non-Sufi organizations affiliated with the ICU began hiring and training bailiffs and police officers.

The ICU also created a coast guard, effectively ending pirate activity through aggressive anti-piracy operations. According to court officials, large contingents of troops were deployed into central Somalia to suppress piracy. In one notable incident, after pirates hijacked a ship and demanded a $1,000,000 ransom, ICU forces recaptured the vessel following a gun battle, deploying dozens of fighters via speedboats.

The courts also began issuing travel visas, resulting in significant influx of investors and former refugees. Another action that significantly increased the ICU's popularity was the restoration of proper ownership regarding land and homes that had been lost or stolen during the civil war. It was noted that as the courts were taking over the city many people simply left the homes they occupied before the rightful owners had even taken their cases to the specialized Sharia courts that were set up for property disputes. During this period the ICU also began to expand its authority by validating major transactions such as the purchase of vehicles or homes and overseeing marriages and divorces.

Prof. Ibrahim Hassan Adow, appointed head of the Foreign Affairs department for the union. He had previously worked as an administrator at the American University in Washington, D.C., before returning to Somalia in 1999.

=== Social and economic ===
After coming into power the Courts began delivering social services and openly pushed for resumption of democratic elections. After law and order, the restitution of education and healthcare were among the groups top priorities. As opposed to the strict enforcement of the Taliban, the ICU did not forcefully impose religious edicts on Somali society, defying international expectations. Commenting on the state of education in the wake of the takeover, The Economist observed that, "...school attendance is rising, particularly among girls." Hassan Dahir Aweys, head of the groups Shura Council, firmly supported the establishment of an Islamic government in Somalia but rejected comparisons to the Taliban. In an interview with The Telegraph, he stated, "We are not the Taliban, and we should be given some credit for what we have done... We don't want labels, we want help."

During the ICU's brief control of southern Somalia, the organization made numerous declarations condemning discrimination against what the courts considered to be "oppressed clans" (e.g., Yibir, Madhibaan and Jareer) as un-Islamic and haram. Marriages were orchestrated between women from discriminated groups to men from larger Somali clans to challenge popular perceptions. The organization vehemently opposed the '4.5 system' utilized by the TFG, arguing that a political framework valuing certain clans as merely being worth 'half' was inherently unjust. The ICU declared that this system, and the effort to install a federal government more broadly, as being intended to fragment the Somali nation. While many of the initial Mogadishu courts were linked to the Hawiye clan, the ICU took deliberate measures to ensure clan bias did not influence legal proceedings. This approach ultimately earned them a reputation for impartiality. The Courts made efforts towards patching together neighborhoods that had been divided by the civil war.

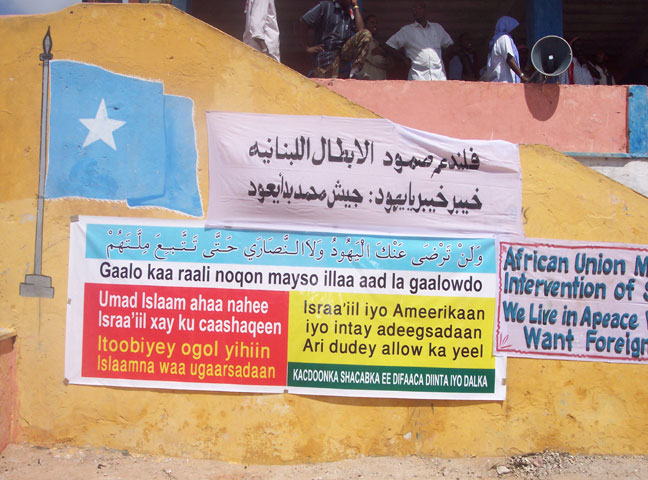
Banners at an ICU rally against the 2006 Israeli invasion of Lebanon, one of which reads "Let us support the steadfastness of the Lebanese heroes"

The capital witnessed a small building boom. By 19 June 2006, the ICU founded several clinics and schools in the city. Mogadishu International Airport, closed since the withdrawal of UNOSOM II forces in 1995, was reopened by the courts on July 15, 2006. On August 25, the historic seaport, once one of the busiest in East Africa, was also reopened by the courts, marking a crucial step in revitalizing the region's economic infrastructure. The formation of a sanitation committee and the organization of a substantial clean-up campaign on 20 July 2006 resulted in the first clearing of war debris and rubbish from Mogadishu's streets in over a decade. This successful initiative was further expanded to regions surrounding the capital. In August 2006, the courts issued a directive imposing a ban on the export of rare birds and wildlife from Somalia. Simultaneously, a prohibition on charcoal exports was enacted, driven by the alarming rate of deforestation occurring across the country due to the practice.

The courts secured broad support from the Mogadishu business community by addressing issues such as theft and extortion, creating a more favourable environment for trade. As they advanced through southern Somalia, the ICU eliminated all militia checkpoints on the 'Baidoa Corridor,' a vital transport and trade route to Kenya. Under the courts' administration, transportation costs on the corridor plummeted by 50%. Traders involved in studies on the route hailed the period under ICU control as a 'golden era of overall land trade.' Additionally, the courts focused on enhancing traffic flow in Mogadishu, deploying personnel to regulate traffic and dismantle roadblocks at major roads and junctions. Consequently, the following weeks witnessed a noteworthy decline in the prices of goods. Towns south of the capital such as Buulo Mareer saw a drastic drop in the price of commodities as the courts took over. Researchers conducting fieldwork in Somalia during May 2023 observed that some of the only banknotes still circulating in the country were ones issued by the ICU government over a decade and half earlier.

== Islamic Courts expansion and Ethiopian invasion (June–September 2006) ==
British television station Channel 4 acquired a leaked document detailing a confidential meeting between senior American and Ethiopian officials in Addis Ababa six months prior to the full scale December 2006 invasion. Participants deliberated on various scenarios, with the 'worst-case scenario' being the potential takeover of Somalia by the Islamic Courts Union. The documents revealed that the US found the prospect unacceptable and would back Ethiopia in the event of an ICU takeover. Journalist Jon Snow reported that during the meeting ‘the blueprint for a very American supported Ethiopian invasion of Somalia was hatched’. No Somali officials were involved in the discussions. Pentagon officials and intelligence analysts reported that the invasion had been planned during the summer of 2006 and that US special forces were on the ground before the Ethiopians had intervened. According to Ted Dagne, an Africa specialist for the US Congressional Research Service, the Islamic Courts had committed no act or provocation to initiate the Ethiopian invasion. American historian William R. Polk observes that the invasion had been unprovoked.

With its newfound position of authority, the ICU seized on its popularity and began pushing deep into the regions surrounding the city for the first time. Their offensive capability was greatly aided by new weaponry it had captured from the CIA backed warlord alliance. The Islamic Courts movement found significant support across Somalia. According to Prof. Abdi Ismail Samatar, "...the enthusiasm of the population for change, was such that far off regions in the country, like Somaliland and Puntland, felt pressure and pronounced that they would use Sharia as a basis for governing their regions." Many Somalis across the nation held fundraising drives at mosques for the Islamic Courts. Several hundred men from Somaliland joined the Courts militia, while the contribution from ICU supporters in Puntland was primarily financial and logistical. During the summer of 2006, a UN report alleged the ICU was being given support by Eritrea, Djibouti, Iran, Libya, Egypt, Saudi Arabia and Ba'athist Syria.

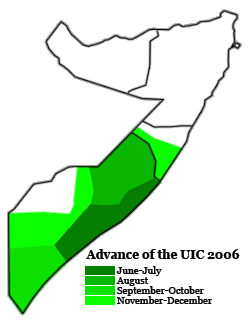
Advance of the Islamic Courts offensive

=== First Ethiopian incursions ===
The Ethiopian invasion began with the dispatch of several thousands troops around Baidoa city located in Bay region, far inside Somalia, to build a bridgehead for a future large scale military operation. On 16 June 2006, Shabeelle Media Network reported that sources in Ethiopia's Somali Region had witnessed a massing of ENDF 'heavy armoured vehicles' along all the border towns on the Ethiopian–Somali border. The following day on 17 June, local Somali officials and residents in Gedo region reported about 50 Ethiopian armored vehicles had passed through the border town of Dolow and pushed 50 km inland near the town of Luuq. Although the Ethiopian government denied claims of ENDF forces crossing the border, residents in towns within Somalia reported encounters with Ethiopian troops inquiring whether the ICU had reached the area.

ICU head Sheik Sharif Ahmed claimed that hundreds of Ethiopian troops had entered the country through the border town of Dolow in Gedo region and that Ethiopian forces had also been probing Somali border towns. He threatened to fight Ethiopian troops if they continued intervening and declared, "We want the whole world to know what’s going on. The United States is encouraging Ethiopia to take over the area. Ethiopia has crossed our borders and are heading for us." Sharif stated that the courts had no intention of attacking Ethiopia, but claimed that Ethiopian forces had 'brought war' by beginning an incursion into Somalia. The Ethiopian government would deny the deployment of its forces in Somalia and countered that the ICU was marching towards its borders. The TFG denied accusations of an Ethiopian military deployment counter claiming that ICU was fabricating a pretext to assault its capital in Baidoa. Soon after Hassan Dahir Aweys stated in an interview with Agence France Presse, "We are ready for partnership with the Americans. We would like to work with them if they respect us and stop interfering with Somali internal affairs,"

=== Khartoum ICU/TFG talks ===
The TFG, overshadowed by the achievements of the ICU, was in dire need of the popularity and military capacity of the courts and the ICU in turn was in need of international recognition. UN Secretary-General Koffi Annan urged the ICU and TFG to unite and form a government to attain a lasting peace in Somalia. In late June, the UN formally created a contact group to directly communicate with the Islamic Courts. The Associated Press reported that the development reflected a growing realization within the UN that the ICU was the first serious governing body to appear since the collapse of the Somali state in 1991.

The Arab League arranged a conference between the ICU and TFG in June 2006 to discuss merger proposals in Khartoum, Sudan. The talk initially began positively but rapidly collapsed over the issue of Ethiopian forces deployed to Somalia at the request of the TFG. The ICU insisted that the presence of Ethiopian forces was the priority and should be dealt with first, while the TFG insisted that an agreement on a unified government had to be made before removing the Ethiopian presence. Neither side was willing to compromise on the issue of Ethiopian troops, leading to the collapse of the talks. On 22 June 2006, the ICU and the TFG mutually recognized each other and that neither would engage in hostile propaganda against the other. Both parties agreed to renew talks and meet again in Khartoum.

During the talks another significant deployment of Ethiopian troops occurred on July 20, 2006, when they moved into Somalia. Local witnesses reported 20 to 25 armored vehicles crossing the border. The Ethiopian government once again denied the presence of any troops inside Somalia. Reuters estimated that roughly 5,000 ENDF troops had built up inside Somalia by this point. This prompted an immediate warning from Sheik Sharif Sheik Ahmed that the organization would invoke a jihad against Ethiopian forces if they did not withdraw. The escalation of Ethiopian troop deployments into Somalia during July 2006 began raising fears of a possible 'all-out war' in the Horn of Africa. The TFG publicly denied the existence of Ethiopian forces in Baidoa and argued the claims were ICU propaganda. TFG minister of information Mohammed Abdi Hayir, claimed that sightings of Ethiopian forces in Somalia were a result of confused identity as Ethiopia had merely provided 4,000 uniforms to TFG forces."

Two days later, another contingent of Ethiopian troops crossed into Somalia, leading to the collapse of the Khartoum peace talks between the ICU and TFG. Approximately 200 ENDF troops seized Wajid, taking control of the airport. Following the deployment at Wajid, the ICU walked out of talks with the TFG. Abdirahman Janaqow, the deputy leader of the ICU executive council, stated soon after that, "The Somali government has violated the accord and allowed Ethiopian troops to enter Somali soil." The TFG claimed that no Ethiopians were in Somalia and that only their troops were in Wajid. Soon after, residents reported two military helicopters landing at the town's airstrip. BBC News confirmed reports of Ethiopian troops in Wajid during interviews with local residents and aid workers. Following the towns seizure, the ICU pledged to wage a holy war to drive out ENDF forces in Somalia. The TFG insisted that the ICU withdraw to the territory it had occupied during the June conference, while the ICU demanded the withdrawal of Ethiopian military contingents in Somalia before discussions resumed. The two primary mediators, the Arab League and the Intergovernmental Authority on Development (IGAD) were both viewed as biased by the ICU and TFG. The ICU accused the IGAD of being partial to the TFG, while the TFG accused the Arab League of complicity with the ICU.

Eventually talks did resume, but in September instead of July 2006. Negotiations quickly broke down over the issues of Ethiopian forces and ICU expansion. According to former Somali diplomat and writer Ismail Ali Ismail, the failure of the second Khartoum talks stemmed from incompetent mediation, as he argues that the roadblock could have been resolved if the mediators had suggested and pushed for a simultaneous withdrawal of both ICU and Ethiopian forces under international supervision.

=== Military escalation ===
Before the full-scale invasion began, more than 10,000 ENDF forces had been built up in and around Baidoa over the months since the first incursion. Professor Abdi Ismail Samatar observes that the Ethiopians had complete control over the TFG headquarters and had begun arming warlords defeated by the ICU. The first clash between ICU and ENDF forces occurred on 9 October 2006. ICU positions at the town of Burhakaba were attacked, forcing the courts to retreat. AFP reported that residents in Baidoa had witnessed a large column of Ethiopian forces. The ICU claimed that the ENDF had also sent another large deployment across the Somali border. Following the battle, Sharif Sheikh Ahmed announced "This is clear aggression...Our forces will face them soon if they do not retreat from Somali territories" and declared Jihad against the ENDF forces. Meles Zenawis government denied that ENDF troops were in Somalia, but local residents in Burhakaba confirmed their presence. The Economist reported that the Ethiopian military incursion had set off a fierce reaction even among the most moderate of the ICU, and a recruitment mobilization began to raise a force to take back Burhakaba.

During early November 2006, Puntland government officials threatened to "either incarcerate, kill or deport" religious leaders who formed an Islamic Court in the city of Galkayo. Several weeks later after intense local pressure, Puntland declared it would move towards adopting Sharia following a meeting between committee of religious heads and leader of the state, Mohamud Muse Hersi. High ranking Somaliland military officers defected to the ICU. Islamic Courts officials reported around 100 fighters from Puntland had defected to join their ranks in mid-November. On 29 November 2006, the courts claimed Ethiopian forces had shelled Bandiradley. The next day ICU forces ambushed an ENDF convoy outside of Baidoa.

The most significant event to immediately prelude the full scale 2006 invasion was the passing of United Nations Security Council 1725 on 6 December 2006. The resolution called for the deployment of foreign troops and the lifting of the arms embargo. The Islamic Courts and Muslim Somali leaders had in the months prior to the resolution firmly rejected the deployment of any international military forces in Somalia as an act of war. Top leaders of the TFG had previously requested that 20,000 foreign troops, including Ethiopian forces be deployed to Somalia, though the move was opposed by many parliamentarians. While the resolution explicitly dictated no neighbouring states would be permitted to participate, Ethiopia had already breached a prior UN resolution by deploying thousands of troops into Somalia. The resolution was widely viewed by the Courts as the UN Security Council unjustly legitimizing an Ethiopian invasion, considering the UNSCR had refused to make any commentary or statement on the troops already deployed inside of Somalia. Herman Cohen, the US Assistant Secretary of State for African Affairs, noted the US decision to back resolution had been influenced by false Ethiopian intelligence. The ICU viewed the passing of UNSCR 1725 as effectively a declaration of war and an international endorsement of the invasion.

=== Full scale invasion ===
In late December 2006, approximately 50,000 Ethiopian troops backed by tanks, Mi-24 helicopter gunships and Su-27s launched a full-scale invasion into Somalia to topple the ICU and install the TFG. Alongside these troops, the Bush Administration covertly deployed US Special Forces backed by AC-130 gunships in support of ENDF forces. The lightly armed court forces were unable to counter ENDF/US air supremacy and armour. The timing and scale of the attack surprised many international observers, leading many to conclude that it was 'fairly obvious that Ethiopia had received significant help' during the invasion. Reuters reported American and British Special Forces, along with US-hired mercenaries, had been laying the ground work for the invasion within and outside Somalia since late 2005. During the invasion the United States provided satellite surveillance of ICU forces to the ENDF, along with extensive military and logistical support extending to the provision of spare parts. The European Union was reportedly 'exceptionally unhappy' about the heavy US support for the invasion, and held back funds for the newly created AMISOM mission for several months.

To avoid turning Mogadishu into a war zone once again, the ICU withdrew from the city on December 26, 2006. The top leaders of the ICU, including Sheikh Hassan Dahir Aweys, Sheikh Sharif Sheikh Ahmed and Sheikh Abdirahman Janaqow, resigned the next day.

== Insurgency (2007–2009) ==
In the last days of December 2006, Ethiopian and TFG troops entered Mogadishu. Following the Ethiopian invasion and subsequent occupation, Somalia once again began slipping into a state of chaos. Between 2007 and 2008 approximately two-thirds of Mogadishu's residents were forced to flee the growing violence in the city, and Somalia began to experience one of the worst humanitarian crises in its history.

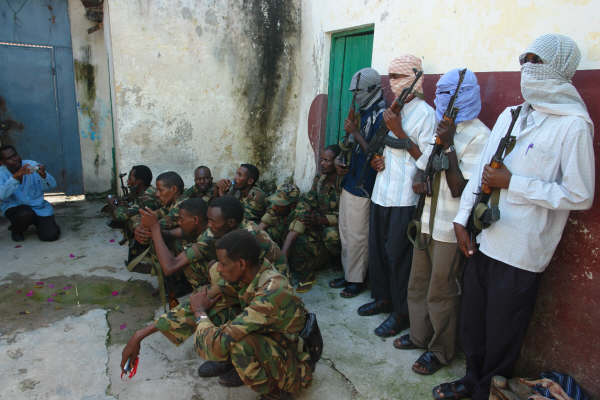
ICU insurgents with prisoners of war in Mogadishu (2008)

Despite the general collapse of the organization in early 2007, members of the Islamic Courts Union regrouped and continued fighting against the Ethiopian occupation during 2007 and 2008. ICU figures led the early phase of the insurgency to the occupation, attracting significant support from Somalis in the Banaadir region and from Somalis across the world. The organizations Foreign Affairs minister Ibrahim Hassan Adow announced that the Islamic Courts movements was still intact and operating in Somalia. Despite much of the leadership seeking refugee in Eritrea, vice-chairman Sheikh Abdilqadir Ali Omar remained in Somalia to lead the ICU.

The invasion resulted in the deaths of many Islamic Courts Union affiliates, leaving a vacuum for the small group of several hundred youth that served as the ICU's Shabaab militia to gain prominence, though Al-Shabaab did not heavily participate in the insurgency or large scale fighting for much of early 2007, opting instead to carry out bombings and assassinations while further establishing itself. Prior to the invasion, Al-Shabaab was largely kept in check and ideologically moderated under the oversight of the ICU. However, with the collapse of ICU leadership, Al-Shabaab fell increasingly under the sway of militant extremists, leading to a hardened ideological stances. The group began enforcing a far stricter understanding of the Sharia than the courts had previously implemented.

As fighting in Mogadishu escalated, ICU insurgents in southern Somalia found a window of opportunity and peacefully captured the town of Dhobley near the Kenyan border in mid October. At the end of October 2007, some of the heaviest fighting in months broke out between the ENDF and ICU insurgents in the capital when Ethiopian troops launched an offensive on ICU positions. By November, small pockets of Islamic Courts Union control were appearing in various places across the country. The Ethiopian government also accused ICU fighters of fighting alongside the ONLF during 2007.

=== Creation of the ARS party ===
In September 2007 the successor to the Islamic Courts Union, the Alliance for the Re-liberation of Somalia (ARS), was founded by numerous high ranking ICU officials who had south refuge in Eritrea. Sheikh Sharif Ahmed was elected head of the organization and promptly declared war on Ethiopian forces. The ARS further announced its refusal to hold talks with the TFG until an Ethiopian withdrawal. In June 2008 the ARS and TFG signed a peace accord agreeing to the cessation of all hostilities between the two parties. Though successful, the talks were once again threatened by the issue of Ethiopian military forces deployed in Somalia.

=== Escalation of insurgency ===
By mid-2008 Islamic Courts Union loyalists, Al-Shabaab and supporters of the Alliance for the Re-Liberation of Somalia (ARS) were the primary insurgent forces operating in Somalia. During June 2008 the ICU publicly declared it would continue its attacks on ENDF/TFG bases and a new Islamic court was opened in Jowhar. According to Voice of America, the insurgency in 2008 was effectively being waged by two distinct groups, the nationalist leaning ICU insurgents and the increasingly international jihadist oriented Al-Shabaab. Residents reported that Islamic Courts insurgents had far more popular support than Al-Shabaab and receiving significant funds from both the local business communities and the Somali diaspora. By July, ICU forces controlled the cities of Beledweyne and Wajid. In late July, forces loyal to the ICU engaged in a battle with Ethiopian troops in Beledweyne. The ENDF shelled the western part of Beledweyne with rocket and mortar fire, resulting in an exodus of civilians. By November 2008, ICU insurgents once again controlled the cities of Jowhar and Beledweyne. These regions operated independently of Al-Shabaab and the two groups came into contention. Al-Shabaab spokesman Mukhtar Robow publicly denied conflict between the two groups and claimed that although there had been past differences, both factions cooperated on the grounds opposing an Ethiopian military presence.

=== Ethiopian withdrawal and ARS–TFG merger ===
Footage uploaded on Islamic Courts insurgent website of an ENDF officer and TFG soldiers defecting to ICU fighters in Mogadishu (7 Sep 2008)

By November 2008, insurgency had effectively won. The majority of south and central Somalia, along with the capital was now under the control of Islamist factions. Ethiopia had redeployed much of its army out of Somalia by the end of the year. By the end of 2008, Al-Shabaab had emerged as one Somalia's most dominant insurgent factions, eclipsing the influence of the Islamic Courts. Some foreign diplomats feared that Al-Shabaab would wage an all out war against other insurgents following the Ethiopian withdrawal.

As ENDF forces withdrew from Somalia, tensions between the differing resistance factions exacerbated. By the end of 2008, most elements of the pre-invasion Islamic Courts had merged into one of the two wings of the Alliance for the Re-liberation of Somalia or had joined Al-Shabaab. Some Islamic factions continued operating under the ICU banner into 2009 and tended to support the new TFG government led by Sharif Ahmed, which described the ICU groups as the governments 'paramilitary'.

In January 2009, fighters loyal to the Islamic Courts Union engaged in a large military confrontation in Balad, Middle Shabeelle, against Al-Shabaab resulting in several deaths. During April 2009, Islamic Courts fighters attempted to assassinate the commander of Al-Shabaab's “death squad” in Mogadishu, leading to Shabaab ordering attacks against the remaining ICU forces.

=== Post–ICU rule ===
In the wake of the ICU's disintegration, fringe Islamic groups began empowering themselves as Somalis from many walks of life rallied against the Ethiopian invasion and violence greatly escalated over the following years. Al-Shabaab, an obscure organization at this point, gained immense popularity as a resistance group fighting against the Ethiopians. Consequently, much of Somalia south of Mogadishu became Al Shabaab ruled territory. The Islamic Courts Union had actively fought pirate activity on the Somali coast, and consequently piracy thrived in their wake.

Under the Courts, there was literally no piracy.

— Hans Tino Hansen, CEO of Risk Intelligence, a Danish maritime security consultant

During the period of the Courts governance, the number of militia road checkpoints in Somalia (along with the cost of passing them) drastically fell. After the invasion, militia checkpoints once again proliferated in large parts of southern Somalia in early 2007. The locations of these checkpoints on the road from Kismayo to Dhobley have remained relatively the same as of late 2023.

== Criticism and allegations ==
During the period of its governance, the ICU in general did not exhibit hardline tendencies or interpretations. There was ideological friction between the ‘moderate’ wing of the Islamic Courts led by the Chairman of the Executive Council, Sheikh Sharif, and the 'hardline' wing led by the Chairman of the Courts Shura (Consultative Council), Sheikh Aweys, manifested when some wings of the Courts started making policies and statements without reference to the collective leadership. Many of these were conservative social policies which were not widely popular. Aweys still retained popularity among many Somalis, as his call for restoring discipline and order through Islamic governance resonated in a deeply unsettled context. He rejected comparisons to the Taliban and argued that the ICU's approach was shaped by Somalia's unique circumstances. Somalia's only popular drug, Khat, was outright banned. During the civil war many had relied the selling and distribution of the drug as one of their sole sources of income and consequently the ban had serious repercussions on people's ability to afford basic necessities. Cigarettes were also banned. Charcoal exports were banned on account of the industry devastating Somalia's fragile environment. Once again many had relied on the practice to make ends meet. Some citizens had criticized the early Islamic courts for handing punishments out to petty criminals far more frequently than powerful gangsters and warlords.

The United Nations claimed the Islamic Courts Union had sent 700 troops to fight the IDF alongside Hezbollah during the 2006 Lebanon War and that the ICU was also giving Iran access to uranium deposits within Somalia. Hezbollah rejected the claims as "incorrect and silly" and Hassan Dahir Aweys of the ICU Shura council called on the UN stop publishing "baseless propaganda". The Israelis claimed that they "were aware" of an ICU presence in Lebanon. Observers drew parallels between the UN's allegations in 2006 and the accusations made by the United States leading up to the 2003 invasion of Iraq. They noted that a foreign deployment of 700 troops would have amounted to nearly one-third of the ICU's trained military forces, a significant loss for the organization. Several sitting TFG ministers were members of a CIA backed alliance of warlords fighting the ICU. Hardline elements within the Courts, who viewed the TFG as an Ethiopian puppet, reportedly engaged in assassinations of TFG personnel.

The ICU was also accused of enacting extremist policies such as banning television, shutting down cinemas and preventing women from working. A US Congressional Research Service report on Somalia investigating the allegations found no evidence to support to the assertion that women had ever been banned from working by the Islamic Courts. It was further revealed in interviews with local residents and courts officials that there had been some prohibitions on watching soccer games on television late at night, but merely due to disturbances and fighting. Cinemas had also been restricted, though only in the mornings at the direct request of Mogadishu parents who were frustrated with the issue of children skipping school to see films or because they had been playing pornographic content.

== See also ==
- Alliance for the Re-liberation of Somalia
- Islam in Somalia

== Bibliography ==
=== Books ===
- Elmi, Afyare Abdi (2010). Understanding the Somalia Conflagration: Identity, Political Islam and Peacebuilding. Pluto Press. ISBN 9780745329741.
- Massoud, Mark Fathi (2021). Shari'a, Inshallah: Finding God in Somali Legal Politics. Cambridge University Press. doi:10.1017/9781108965989. ISBN 9781108965989.

=== Papers ===
- Cocodia, Jude (2021). "Rejecting African Solutions to African Problems: The African Union and the Islamic Courts Union in Somalia". African Security. 14 (2): 110–131. doi:10.1080/19392206.2021.1922026. S2CID 236350899 – via Taylor & Francis.
- Samatar, Abdi Ismail (March 2007). "Ethiopian Invasion of Somalia, US Warlordism & AU Shame". Review of African Political Economy. 34 (111): 115–165. JSTOR 20406369.
