= Ali Matan Mosque =

Mosque in Hargeisa, Somaliland

- Masjidka Cali Mataan
- Location within Somaliland

Religion
- Affiliation: Islam
- Ecclesiastical or organizational status: Mosque
- Status: Active

Location
- Location: Hargeisa, Somaliland
- Country: Somalia
- Interactive map of Ali Matan Mosque
- Coordinates: 9°33′42″N 44°04′06″E

Architecture
- Type: Mosque

The Ali Matan Mosque (Somali: Masjidka Cali Mataan) is a mosque in Hargeisa, Somaliland, in Somalia. The mosque is located in a four-story building.

== See also ==
- Islam in Somalia
