= Masjid al-Qiblatayn, Zeila =

Former mosque in Zeila, Awdal, Somaliland

Masjid al-Qiblatayn
- مَـسْـجِـد الْـقِـبْـلَـتَـيْـن; Masjidka Labada Qibla
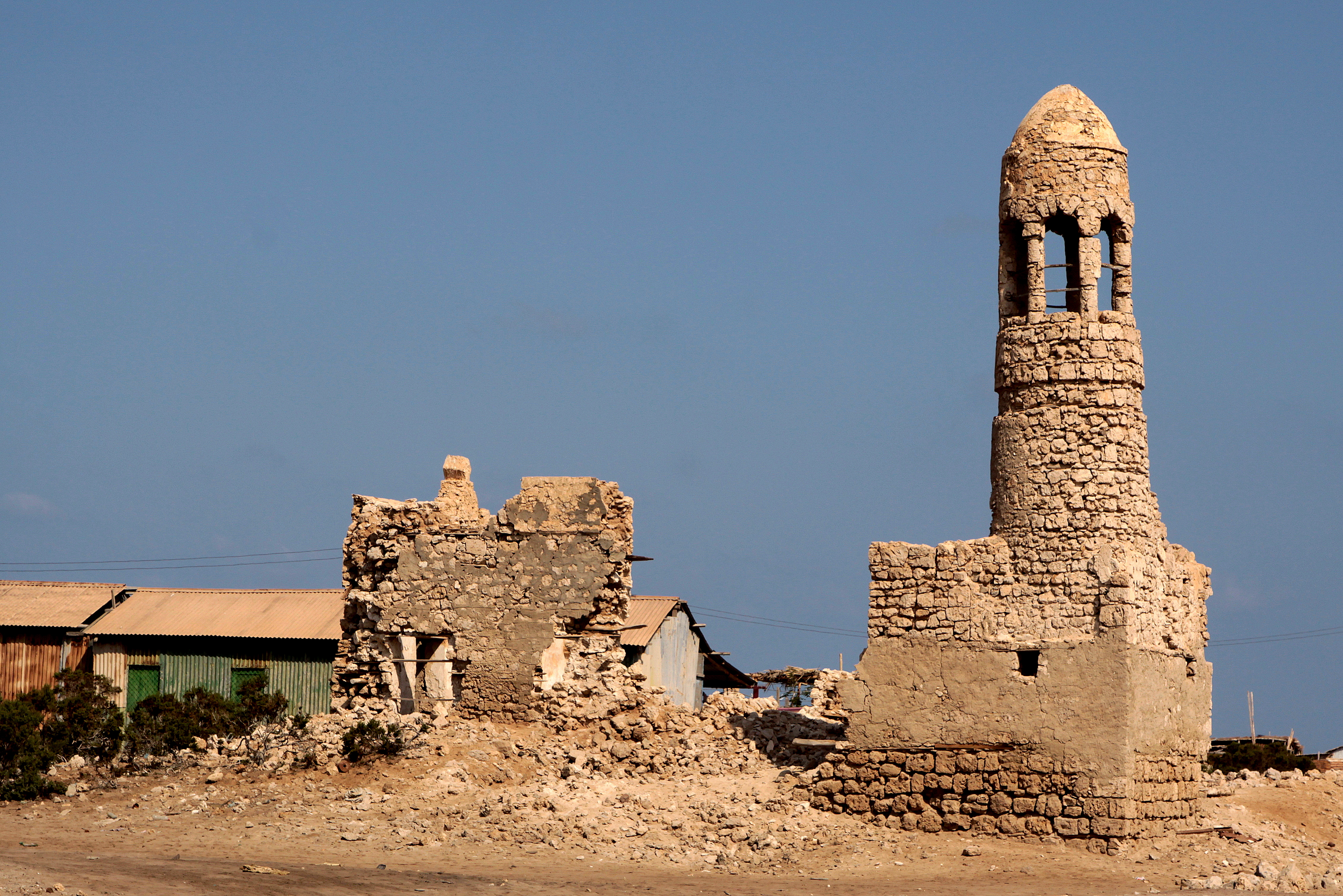
- Mosque ruins

Religion
- Affiliation: Islam
- Ecclesiastical or organisational status: Mosque
- Status: Inactive

Location
- Location: Zeila, Awdal, Somaliland,Somalia
- Interactive map of Masjid al-Qiblatayn
- Coordinates: 11°21′14″N 43°28′26″E

The Masjid al-Qiblatayn (Somali: Masjidka Labada Qibla, lit. 'Mosque of the two Qiblas'; Arabic: مَـسْـجِـد الْـقِـبْـلَـتَـيْـن) is a former mosque, in a partial ruinous state, located in Zeila, in the western Awdal region of Somaliland, in northern Somalia. The name of the mosque reflects the belief that it was once aligned to both Mecca and Jerusalem.

== Date ==
The oldest remains on site are undated and further archeological investigation is needed to understand them. According to local tradition, Muhammad's family migrated to Abyssinia in the early seventh century and constructed the mosque thereafter.

At present, scholarly dates for the Islamicization of the region are uncertain and may be as late as the thirteenth and fourteenth centuries, though others suggest a possibly earlier but unknown date.

== Description ==
The mosque's name means 'mosque of the two qiblahs', referring to its two mihrabs. According to tradition, one of the mihrabs was oriented north toward Mecca and the other northwest toward Jerusalem.

The building is largely in ruins. This is due to repeated diggings as well as exposure of the foundations of the structure, without any conservation efforts protecting the site. In 2007, George Abungu produced a report of the site as part of a UNESCO assessment mission.

Only one mihrab, oriented northward, was visible. The remains of another structure nearby are visible, possibly indicating that the mosque underwent two different phases of construction. It also contains the tomb of a sheikh named Babu Dena.

== See also ==
- Islam in Somalia
- List of mosques in Somalia
