= Adado District =

Adado District Degmada Cadaado Blue City
- District
- Country: Somalia
- Federal Member State: Galmudug
- Region: Galguduud
- Capital: Adado

Government
  - Type: District Administration
  - District Commissioner: Farah Dirie Ahmed
  - Deputy District Commissioner: Shilin Maxamed Cali

Population (2026)
  - Total: 129,000
- Local estimate
- Time zone: UTC+3 (EAT)

Adado District (Somali: Degmada Cadaado) is a district in the central Galguduud region of Somalia and forms part of the Galmudug State. Its administrative capital is Adado.

== Administration ==
The district is administered by the Adado District Administration under the Galmudug State Government.

- District Commissioner: Farah Dirie Ahmed
- Deputy District Commissioner: Shilin Maxamed Cali

== Population ==
According to local estimates, Adado District had a population of approximately 129000 residents in 2026. The district includes the town of Adado and surrounding villages, settlements, and pastoral communities.

== Economy ==
Adado is one of the main commercial centers in central Somalia. The district's economy is primarily driven by:

- Livestock trade
- Retail and wholesale commerce
- Transportation services
- Telecommunications
- Money transfer companies
- Real estate development
- Small and medium-sized businesses
- Remittances from the Somali diaspora

The city serves as a regional market hub linking communities across Galguduud and Mudug regions, with trade and entrepreneurship forming the backbone of the local economy.

== Education ==
Adado hosts a number of primary and secondary schools, vocational training centers, and higher education institutions that serve students from across central Somalia.

== Healthcare ==
Healthcare services are provided through public and private hospitals, maternal and child health centers, pharmacies, and community health facilities.

== Infrastructure ==
Adado is connected to neighboring districts through road networks and serves as an important transportation and commercial hub in central Somalia.
