= Mosque of Islamic Solidarity =

Mosque in Mogadishu, Somalia

- جامع التضامن الإسلامى; مسجدكا إسبهيسگا
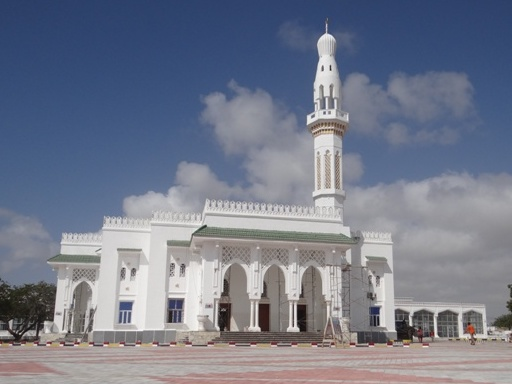
- The mosque overlooking the Somali Sea

- Location within Somalia

Religion
- Affiliation: Islam
- Ecclesiastical or organizational status: Mosque
- Status: Active

Location
- Location: Mogadishu, Banaadir
- Country: Somalia
- Interactive map of Mosque of Islamic Solidarity
- Coordinates: 2°02′09″N 45°19′51″E

Architecture
- Type: Mosque
- Founder: Fahd bin Abdul Aziz Al Saud Foundation
- Completed: 1987

Specifications
- Capacity: 10,000 worshipers
- Minaret: 1

The Mosque of Islamic Solidarity (Arabic: جامع التضامن الإسلامى, Somali: Masjidka Isbahaysiga, مسجدكا إسباهيسگا) is a mosque located in Mogadishu, Banaadir, Somalia, overlooking the Somali Sea.

== Overview ==
The Mosque of Islamic Solidarity was constructed in 1987 by Hamar Construction company with financial support from the Saudi Fahd bin Abdul Aziz Al Saud Foundation. It is one of the main mosques in Somalia's capital city, and an iconic building in Somali society.

Following the start of the civil war in the early 1990s, the mosque was closed. It was later reopened in 2006 by the Islamic Courts Union, which began raising funds from the business community for intended renovations of parts of the building. Further renovation of the mosque commenced in 2012 by the Starsom Group, a local Somali contractor, under the funding of Turkiye Diyanet Foundation, a non-profit, non-governmental organization. The Federal Government of Somalia completed formal refurbishments on the mosque's infrastructure in 2015.

Capable of accommodating up to 10,000 worshippers, it is the largest mosque in the Horn of Africa.

== See also ==
- Islam in Somalia
- List of mosques in Somalia
