= Hamar Weyne, Mogadishu =

Hamar Weyne Xamar Weyne
- Neighbourhood
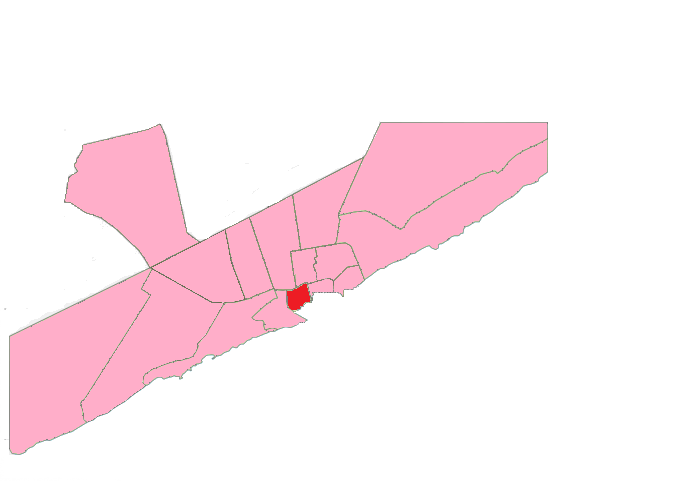
- Country: Somalia
- Region: Banaadir
- City: Mogadishu

Government
  - Neighbourhood Commissioner: Cabdulkadir Maxamed Cabdulkadir
- Time zone: UTC+3 (EAT)

Hamar Weyne Neighbourhood (Somali: Xamar Weyne) is a neighbourhood in the southeastern Banaadir region of Somalia. It includes a part of central Mogadishu. Hamar Weyne is the oldest settlement with in Mogadishu and up until 1938 the city of Mogadishu was made up of Shingani and Hamar Weyne.Somali word "xamar" means tamarind tree.

== Mosques ==
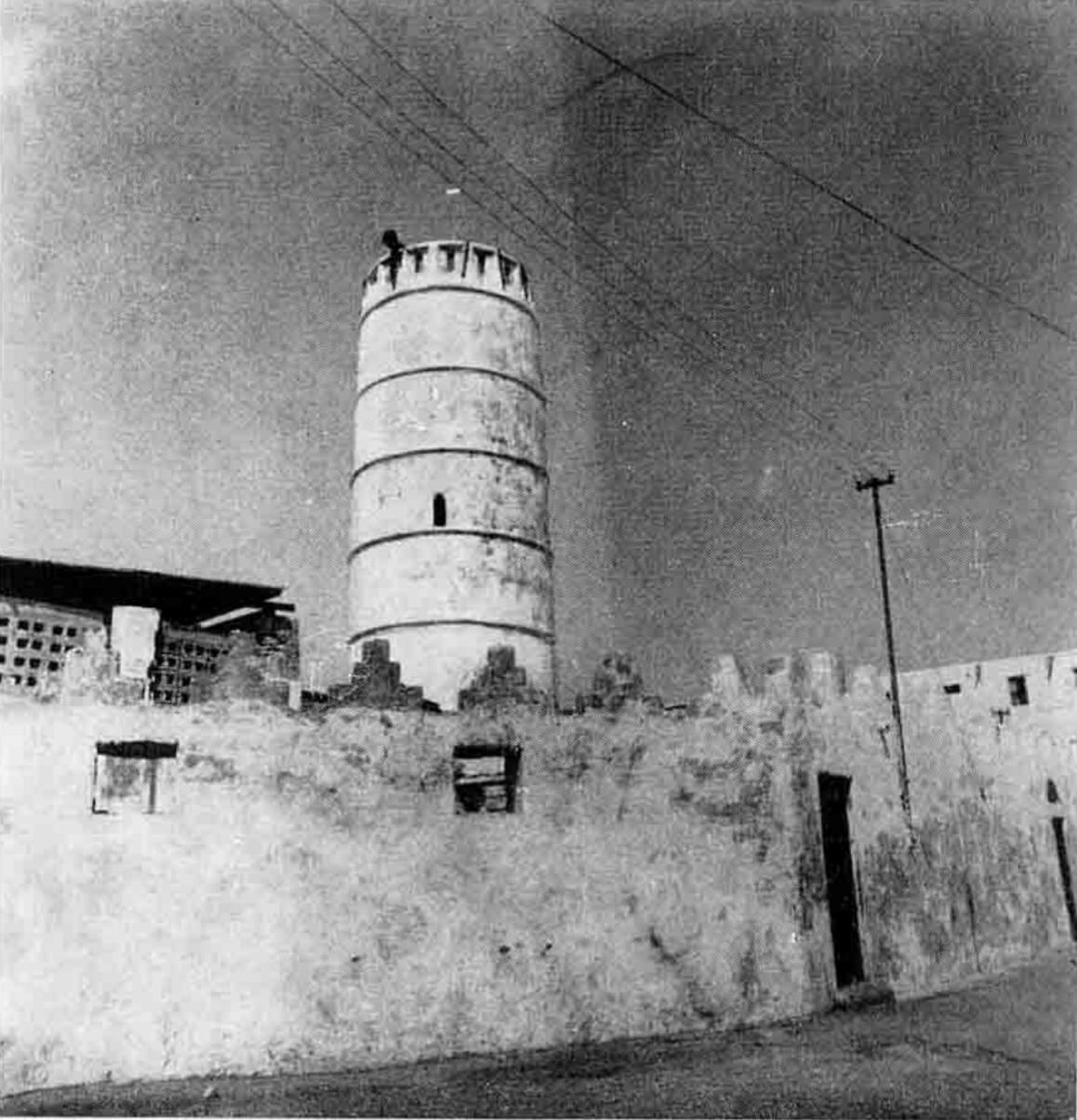
Jama'a Xamar Weyne Hamar Weyne's Friday mosque (Jamacaha Xamar Weyne in Somali)

Despite being one of the smallest districts in Mogadishu, the Hamar Weyne district is known for it many mosques and madrasahs. There are over 25 mosques in this district, which include:

- 'Abdulkadir
- 'Adayga (Aw Musse)
- 'Ano Qube (Raqayga)
- Aw Dhawariyo
- Aw Haji Bawasan
- Aw Mukhtar & Aw Sheikh Omar (The Twin Mosques)
- Aw Osman Hassan
- Awooto Eeday
- Fakhrudiin
- Faraj Bin 'Ali
- Haji Abati Shoble
- Haji 'Ali Abow Hussenka
- Jama'a Xamar Weyne
- Jaama‟ Marwas
- Mohamed Al Tani
- Nuruleyn (Sharif Aghil)
- Pakistan Mosque
- Sharif Hashim
- Sheikh Aweys
- Sheikh Uweys ul Qarni
- Sheikh Ibrahim
- Sheikh Idris
- Sheikh Rumani Ba 'Alawi
