= Shangani, Mogadishu =

District in Mogadisho, Somalia

Shangani asharaaf-al-soomaal residence
- Neighbourhood
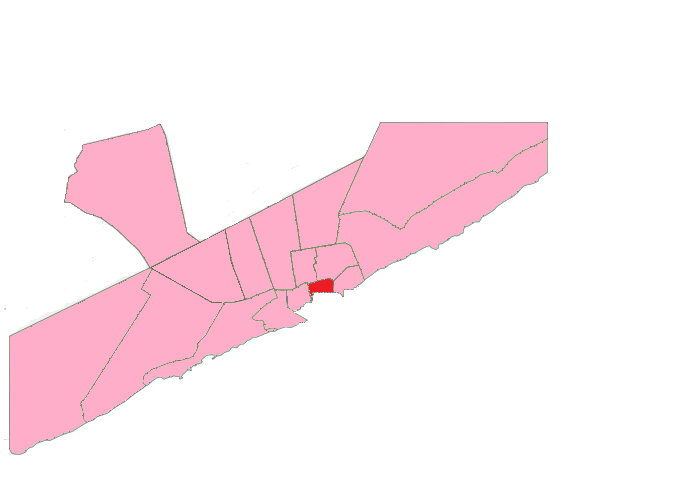
- Country: Somalia
- Region: Banaadir
- City: Mogadishu
- Time zone: UTC+3 (EAT)

Shangani District (Somali: Degmada Shangaani) is a neighbourhood in the southeastern Banaadir region of Somalia. It lies in central Mogadishu.

== Mosques ==
Despite being the smallest districts in Mogadishu, the Shingani along with its neighbouring district Hamar Weyne are known for their many mosques and madrasahs. There are over 15 mosques in this district, which include:

- Arba'a Rukun
- Aw Kampay
- Aw Mojow
- Aw Muqfi
- Aw Faraj Bin 'Ali
- Awo Sharif 'Ali
- Jaama' Shingani (Friday mosque)
- Ma‟la
- Rowda
- Sheikh Ahmed Sharif
- Sheikh Mohamed 'Abdisamad
- Sheikh Omar & Sheikh Nureini (Twin mosques)
- Sheikh Said Bin Isse
- Wafle
