= Fakhr al-Din Mosque =

Mosque in Mogadishu, Somalia

- مسجد فخر الدين
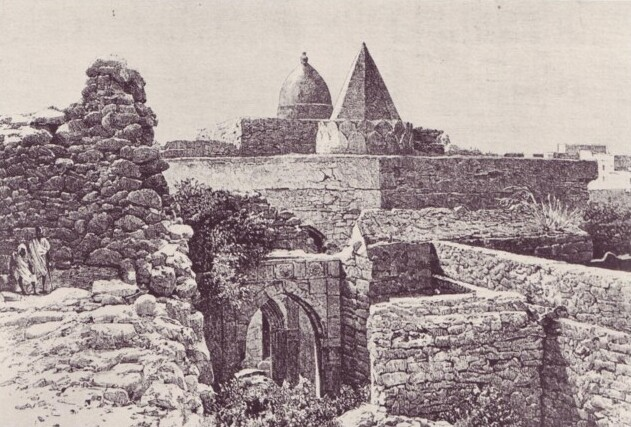
- Illustration of the mosque in 1882

- Location within Somalia

Religion
- Affiliation: Sunni Islam
- Ecclesiastical or organizational status: Mosque
- Status: Active

Location
- Location: Hamar Weyne, Mogadishu, Banaadir
- Country: Somalia
- Interactive map of Fakhr al-Din Mosque
- Coordinates: 2°02′01″N 45°20′09″E

Architecture
- Type: Mosque
- Style: Somalo-Islamic
- Founder: Sultan Fakr ad-Din
- Completed: 1269 CE

Specifications
- Dome: 2
- Minaret: 1
- Materials: Marble

The Fakhr al-Din Mosque (Arabic: مسجد فخر الدين زنكي) is a mosque located in the historical Hamar Weyne district of Mogadishu, Banaadir, Somalia.

== Overview ==
The historical Hamar Weyne district contains approximately 25 small mosques.

The construction of the mosque is dated by a 1269 CE inscription, attributing construction of the mosque to Sultan Fakr ad-Din. The structure displays a compact rectangular plan, with a domed mihrab axis. The mihrab is made of marble from northern India and bears a dated inscription.

Historic photographs of the mosque feature in drawings and images of central Mogadishu from the late 19th century onwards. The mosque can be identified amidst other buildings by its two conical domes, one round and the other hexagonal.

== Gallery ==
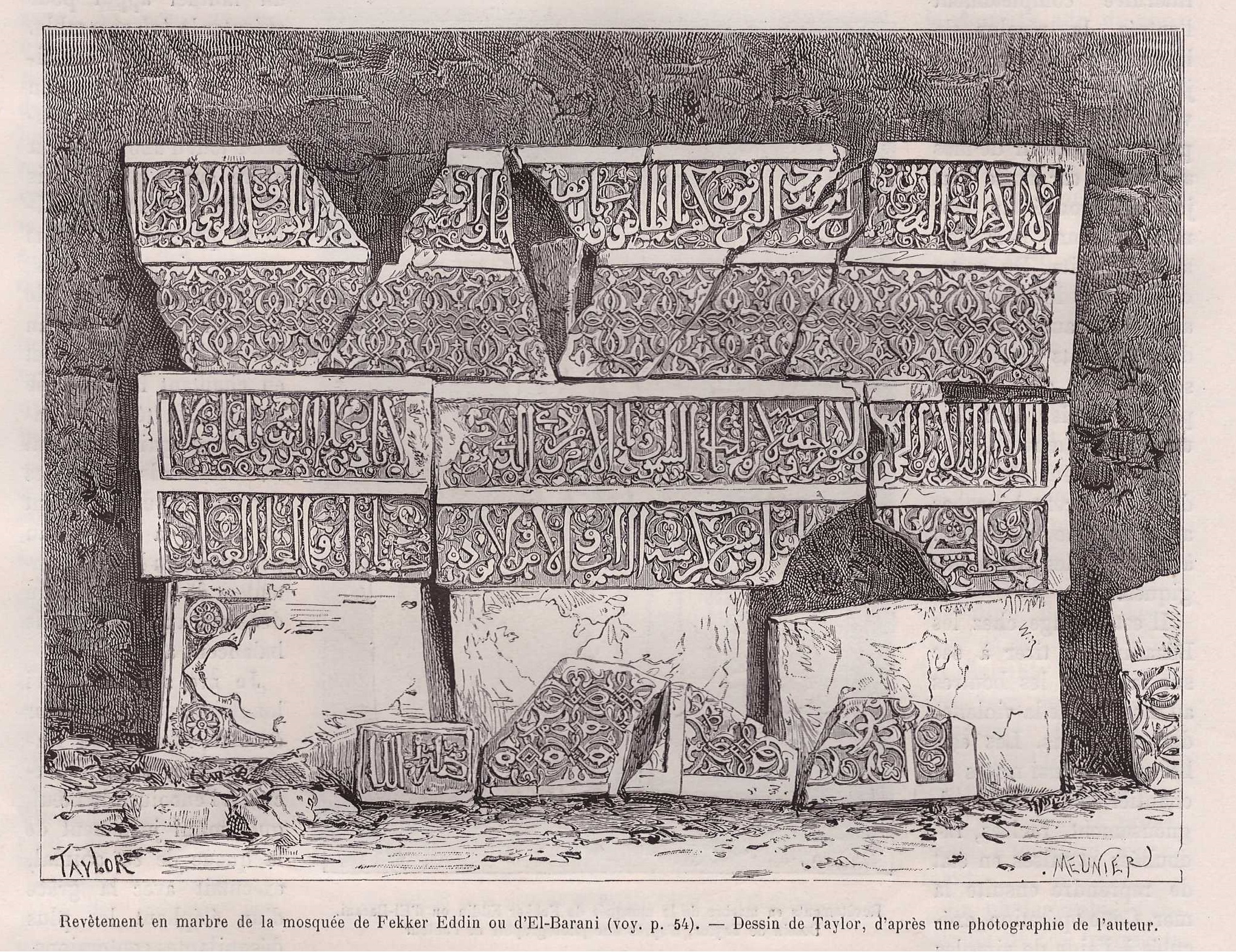
A marble Quranic inscription outside the mosque

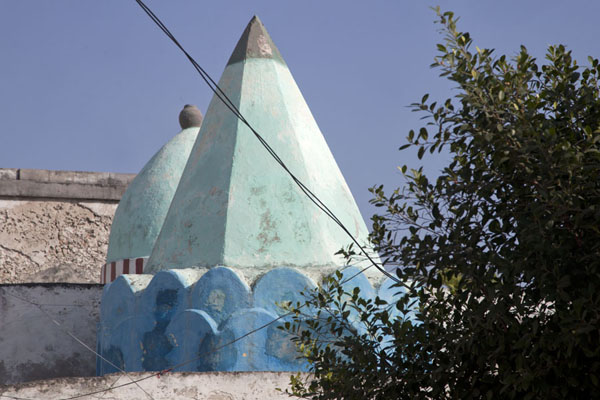
Round and hexagonal conical domes

== See also ==
- Islam in Somalia
- List of mosques in Somalia
