= Islam in Somalia =

Islam has been a part of Somalia's society since the 7th century. Muslims in Somalia follow the Sunni branch of the religion. The majority follow the Shafi'i school while a minority follow the Hanafi school.

Muslims first entered modern-day Somalia in the northwestern city of Zeila during the prophet Muhammad's lifetime, whereupon local tradition holds that they build the Masjid al-Qiblatayn.

There are distinctions between the religious practice of Somalis and their immediate neighbors. Although the Pew Research Center has not conducted a survey in Somalia, its Somali-majority northwestern neighbour Djibouti reported a breakdown of Muslims as 77% Sunni, 8% non-denominational, 2% Shia, and 13% refusing to answer. A further report inclusive of the Somali Region noted 2% adherence to minority sects such as Ibadism and Quranism.

The role of religious functionaries began to shrink in the 1950s and 1960s as some of their legal and educational powers and responsibilities were transferred to secular authorities. The position of religious leaders changed substantially after the 1969 revolution and the introduction of scientific socialism. Siad Barre insisted that his version of socialism was compatible with Qur'anic principles and he condemned atheism. Religious leaders, however, were warned not to meddle in politics.

== History ==
=== Birth of Islam and Middle Ages ===
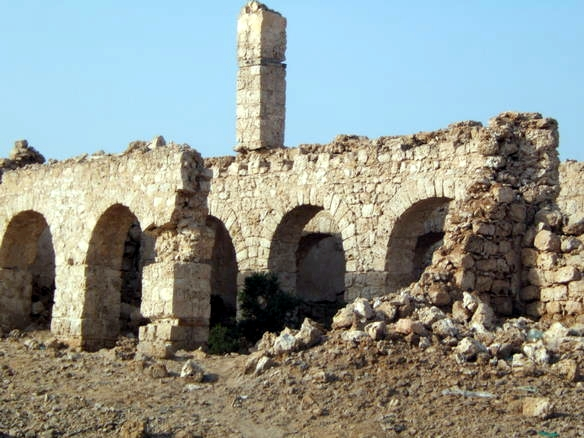
Ruins of the Muslim Adal Sultanate in Zeila.

Islam was introduced to the northern Somali coast early on from the Arabian peninsula, shortly after the hijra. Zeila's two-mihrab Masjid al-Qiblatayn dates to the 7th century, and is the oldest mosque in the country. Somalis were among the earliest non-Arabs to convert to Islam. Several prominent shaykhs are traditionally credited with spreading Islam in Somalia, including Aw Barhadle, Aw Qudub, Aw Cisman Fiqi Cumar (“Garweyne”), and Aw Cisman Xasan Bin Cakaabir.

In the late 9th century, Al-Yaqubi wrote that Muslims were living along the northern Somali seaboard. He also mentioned that the Adal kingdom had its capital in the city, suggesting that the Adal Sultanate with Zeila as its headquarters dates back to at least the 9th or 10th century. According to I.M. Lewis, the polity was governed by local Somali dynasties, who also ruled over the similarly-established Sultanate of Mogadishu in the littoral Benadir region to the south. Adal's history from this founding period forth would be characterized by a succession of battles with neighboring Abyssinia.

In 1332, the Zeila-based King of Adal was slain in a military campaign aimed at halting the Abyssinian Emperor Amda Seyon I's march toward the city to avenge the slaughtered Christians including a famous monk sent to wage peace and destroyed Churches by the Adalites. When the last Sultan of Ifat, Sa'ad ad-Din II, was also killed by Emperor Dawit I in Zeila in 1410, his children escaped to Yemen, before later returning in 1415. In the early 15th century, Adal's capital was moved further inland to the town of Dakkar, where Sabr ad-Din II, the eldest son of Sa'ad ad-Din II, established a new base after his return from Yemen.

Adal's headquarters were again relocated the following century, this time to Harar. From this new capital, Adal organized an effective army led by Imam Ahmad ibn Ibrahim al-Ghazi (Ahmad "Gurey" or "Gran") that invaded the Abyssinian empire. This 16th century campaign is historically known as the Conquest of Abyssinia (Futuh al-Habash). During the war, Imam Ahmad pioneered the use of cannons and firearms supplied by the Ottoman Empire, which he imported through Zeila and thousands of mercenaries from the Muslim world and nomadic Somalia to wage a 'holy war' against Ethiopian King of Kings. The few Portuguese under Cristóvão da Gama that later that came to assist their Ethoipian coreligionist would tip the scale in their favour. Some scholars argue that this conflict proved, through their use on both sides, the value of firearms like the matchlock musket, cannons and the arquebus over traditional weapons. By the 16th century, Somali Muslims cultivated religious ties with the BaʿAlawī Husaynis from Hadramawt, adopting aspects of their tradition. In 1503, Shaykh Sharif Abu Bakr al-Aydarus al-ʿAdanī introduced the Qadiriyya Sufi order into the Horn of Africa.

Flag of the medieval Islamic Ajuran Sultanate.

During the Age of the Ajuran, the sultanates and republics of Merca, Mogadishu, Barawa, Hobyo flourished and had a lucrative foreign commerce, with ships sailing to and coming from Arabia, India, Venetia, Persia, Egypt, Portugal and as far away as China. Vasco da Gama, who passed by Mogadishu in the 15th century, noted that it was a large city with houses several storeys high and large palaces in its center, in addition to many mosques with cylindrical minarets.

The city of Mogadishu came to be known as the City of Islam, and controlled the East African gold trade for several centuries. In the 16th century, Duarte Barbosa noted that many ships from the Kingdom of Cambaya in modern-day India sailed to Mogadishu with cloth and spices, for which they in return received gold, wax and ivory. Barbosa also highlighted the abundance of meat, wheat, barley, horses, and fruit on the coastal markets, which generated enormous wealth for the merchants. Mogadishu was also the center of a thriving textile industry known as toob benadir, specialized for the markets in Egypt, among other places.

=== Modern era ===
Because Muslims believe that their faith was revealed in its complete form to Muhammad, Bidʻah is seen as a major sin. One response was to stress a return to orthodox Muslim traditions and to oppose Westernization totally. The Sufi brotherhoods were at the forefront of this movement, personified in Somalia by Mohammed Abdullah Hassan in the early 20th century. Generally, the leaders of Islamic orders opposed the spread of Western education.

==== 1960–1969: Somali Republic ====
Another response was to reform Islam by reinterpreting it. From this perspective, early Islam was seen as a protest against abuse, corruption, and inequality; reformers therefore attempted to prove that Muslim scriptures contained all elements needed to deal with modernization. To this school of thought belongs Islamic socialism, identified particularly with Egyptian nationalist Gamal Abdul Nasser. His ideas appealed to a number of Somalis, especially those who had studied in Cairo in the 1950s and 1960s.

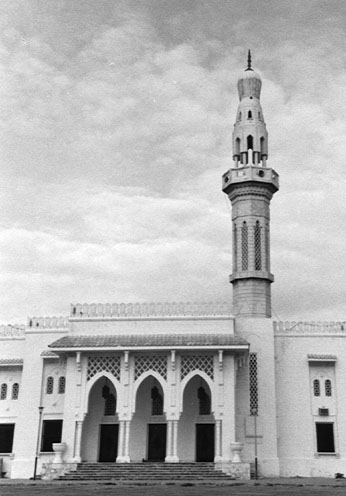
The Mosque of Islamic Solidarity in Mogadishu is the largest masjid in the Horn region.

The 1961 constitution guaranteed freedom of religion but also declared the newly independent republic an Islamic state. The first two post-independence governments paid lip service to the principles of Islamic socialism but made relatively few changes.

==== 1969–1991: Revolutionary government ====
The coup of October 21, 1969, installed a radical regime committed to profound change. Shortly afterward, Stella d'Ottobre, the official newspaper of the Supreme Revolutionary Council (SRC), published an editorial about relations between Islam and socialism and the differences between scientific and Islamic socialism. Islamic socialism was said to have become a servant of capitalism and neocolonialism and a tool manipulated by a privileged, rich, and powerful class. In contrast, scientific socialism was based on the altruistic values that inspired genuine Islam. Religious leaders should therefore leave secular affairs to the new leaders who were striving for goals that conformed with Islamic principles. Soon after, the government arrested several protesting religious leaders and accused them of counterrevolutionary propaganda and of conniving with reactionary elements in the Arabian Peninsula. The authorities also dismissed several members of religious tribunals for corruption and incompetence.

When the Three-Year Plan, 1971–1973, was launched in January 1971, SRC leaders felt compelled to win the support of religious leaders so as to transform the existing social structure. On September 4, 1971, Siad Barre exhorted more than 100 religious teachers to participate in building a new socialist society. He criticized their method of teaching in Qur'anic schools and charged some with using religion for personal profit.

The campaign for scientific socialism intensified in 1972. On the occasion of Eid al-Adha, the major Muslim festival associated with the pilgrimage, the president defined scientific socialism as half practical work and half ideological belief. He declared that work and belief were compatible with Islam because the Qur'an condemned exploitation and money lending and urged compassion, unity, and cooperation among Muslims. But he stressed the distinction between religion as an ideological instrument for the manipulation of power and as a moral force. He condemned the antireligious attitude of Marxists. Religion, Siad Barre said, was an integral part of the Somali worldview, but it belonged in the private sphere, whereas scientific socialism dealt with material concerns such as poverty. Religious leaders should exercise their moral influence but refrain from interfering in political or economic matters.

In the years before the Somali government collapsed Islamist movements, such as Al-Itihaad al-Islamiya, grew in strength as state authority weakened. Despite government crackdowns, the Islamic groups only militarized after the state collapsed and none took up arms against the government. During 1990, just before the full outbreak of the Somali Civil War, a group of sixty highly prominent members of Somali society under the banner of Islamic Call published a public manifesto addressed to President Mohammed Siad Barre. The manifesto warned that he had committed serious transgressions against the laws of Islam and unsuccessfully called on Barre to step down and peacefully transition power.

==== 1991–2006: Rise of Islamist actors ====
Members of the Al-Itihaad had not anticipated the complete collapse of the state in 1991 and instead had expected for a democracy to take Barre's place. As all out civil war began, a faction within Al-Itihaad began pushing to take up arms against the factions that had overthrown the government. This led to significant debates within AIAI and other Islamist factions over what course of action to take. Many members of AIAI believed that a protracted strategy of focusing on social programs should be emphasized instead of attempting to achieve their goals via armed struggle.

Concurrently the first appearance of Sharia courts to build local stability began immediately after the Somali state completely collapsed in January 1991. In the weeks following the toppling of the Somali Democratic Republic, militias that had routed the government began hunting down civilians based on their clan identity. Around this time, several well-known Somali scholars established courts to rescue civilians from these attacks and to address the general rising lawlessness.

In 1997 Al-Itihaad collectively decided to abandon the idea of using force due to internal fissures and military setbacks. That same year the organization effectively became non-existent Following the organization's renunciation of armed struggle, many former AIAI members joined civil society organizations dedicated to public health and education.

During early 1999, several Islamic courts united for the first time, seizing control of Mogadishu's Bakaara Market from local warlords. By the end of the year, their coordinated efforts had begun to weaken the warlords' dominance in the capital. By 2000, having liberated a significant portion of Mogadishu from warlord control, eleven of the Sharia courts amalgamated to establish the Islamic Courts Council, which also led to the unification of their militias into a single combat force. This development marked a pivotal moment in the civil war, as it signified the emergence of the first major non-warlord affiliated Somali armed force in the capital. When the Transitional National Government of Somalia (TNG) was established, the momentum of the Islamic Courts was slowed as they opted to back the first attempt at forming a government and carried out security for the TNG.

Prior to 2006, the Islamic Courts Union effectively operated as a loose federation of regional judiciary systems. The courts had developed their own police detachments, prison system, and increasingly carried out joint military operations with each other. Though often compared to the Taliban during its rise, the ICU did not adopt similar practices or tendencies such as the strict/rigid enforcement of Sharia or the prohibition of women's employment. The leadership of the ICU explicitly rejected comparison Taliban and according to the US Congressional Research Service, the assessment of the Islamic Courts by senior State Department officials was that less than 5% of the Islamic Courts leadership can be considered extremist.

The Federal Government of Somalia's constitution, created in 2012, was created with the aim of an "Islamic state" with Sharia as the source of legislation. Article 1 of the constitution declares all power is invested in Allah first and then in the Somali people. Article 2 declares Islam the state religion and that no other religion may be spread. And Article 3 states the constitution to be foundationally based on the Quran and Sunnah. These provisions were unanimously approved by the delegates involved the drafting of the constitution.

== Religious orders ==
Religious orders always have played a significant role in Somali Islam. The rise of these orders (Tarika, "way" or "path") was connected with the development of Sufism, a mystical sect within Islam that began during the 9th and 10th centuries and reached its height during the 12th and 13th. In Somalia, Sufi orders appeared in towns during the 15th century and rapidly became a revitalizing force. Followers of Sufism seek a closer personal relationship to God through special spiritual disciplines. Escape from self is facilitated by poverty, seclusion, and other forms of self-denial. Members of Sufi orders are commonly called dervishes, from the Persian daraawish (singular darwish, "one who gave up worldly concerns to dedicate himself to the service of God and community"). Leaders of branches or congregations of these orders are given the Arabic title shaykh, a term usually reserved for those learned in Islam and rarely applied to ordinary wadaads (holy men).

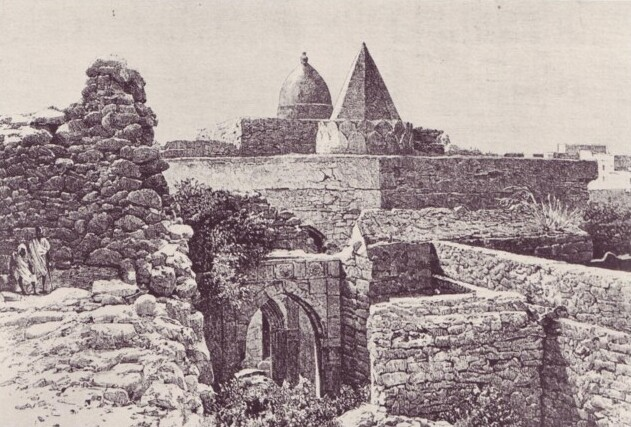
13th century Fakr ad-Din mosque, built by Fakr ad-Din, the first Sultan of the Sultanate of Mogadishu.

Dervishes wandered from place to place teaching. They are best known for their ceremonies, called dhikr, in which states of visionary ecstasy are induced by group- chanting of religious texts and by rhythmic gestures, dancing, and deep breathing. The object is to free oneself from the body and to be lifted into the presence of God. Dervishes have been important as founders of agricultural religious communities called jamaat (singular jamaa). A few of these were home to celibate men only, but usually the jamaat were inhabited by families. Most Somalis were nominal members of Sufi orders.

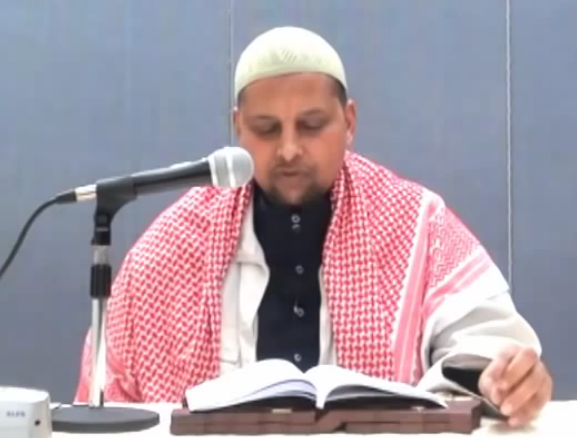
Somali Sheikh Muhammad Dahir Roble reading a Muslim sermon.

Local leaders of brotherhoods customarily asked lineage heads in the areas where they wished to settle for permission to build their mosques and communities. A piece of land was usually freely given; often it was an area between two clans or one in which nomads had access to a river. The presence of a jama'ah not only provided a buffer zone between two hostile groups, but also caused the giver to acquire a blessing since the land was considered given to God. Tenure was a matter of charity only, however, and sometimes became precarious in case of disagreements. No statistics were available in 1990 on the number of such settlements, but in the 1950s there were more than ninety in the south, with a total of about 35,000 members. Most were in the Bakool, Gedo, and Bay regions or along the middle and lower Shabele River. There were few jamaat in other regions because the climate and soil did not encourage agricultural settlements.

Membership in a brotherhood is theoretically a voluntary matter unrelated to kinship. However, lineages are often affiliated with a specific brotherhood and a man usually joins his father's order. Initiation is followed by a ceremony during which the order's dhikr is celebrated. Novices swear to accept the branch head as their spiritual guide.

Each order has its own hierarchy that is supposedly a substitute for the kin group from which the members have separated themselves. Veneration is given to previous heads of the order, known as the Chain of Blessing, rather than to ancestors. This practice is especially followed in the south, where place of residence tends to have more significance than lineage.

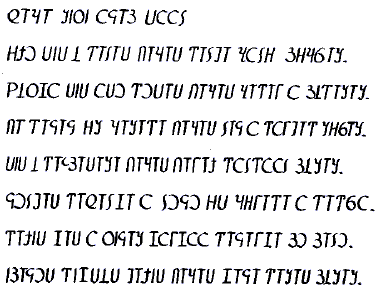
A qasida in the Borama script.

Because of the saint's spiritual presence at his tomb, Sufi pilgrims journey there to pray for them and send blessings to them. Members of the saint's order also visit the tomb, particularly on the anniversaries of his birth and death. Leaders of Sufi orders and their branches and of specific congregations are said to have baraka, a state of blessedness implying an inner spiritual power that is inherent in the religious office, and may cling to the tomb of a revered leader, who, upon death, is considered a pious Muslim. However, some religious leaders are venerated by Sufis because of their religious reputations, whether or not they were associated with an order or one of its communities. Sainthood also has been ascribed to other Sufis because of their status as founders of clans or large lineages. Northern pastoral nomads are likely to honor lineage founders as saints; sedentary Somalis revere saints for their piety and baraka.

The traditional learning of a wadaad includes a form of folk astronomy based on stellar movements and related to seasonal changes. Its primary objective is to signal the times for migration, but it may also be used to set the dates of rituals that are specifically Somali. This folk knowledge is also used in ritual methods of healing and averting misfortune, as well as for divination.

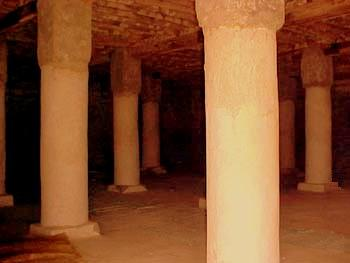
17th century mosque in Hafun.

Wadaddo help avert misfortune by making protective amulets and charms that transmit some of their baraka to others, or by adding the Qur'an's baraka to the amulet through a written passage. The baraka of a saint may be obtained in the form of an object that has touched or been placed near his tomb.

Although wadaddo may use their power to curse as a sanction, misfortune generally is not attributed to curses or witchcraft. Somalis have accepted the orthodox Muslim view that a man's conduct will be judged in an afterlife. However, a person who commits an antisocial act, such as patricide, is thought possessed of supernatural evil powers.

Like other Muslims, Somalis believe in jinn. Certain kinds of illness, including tuberculosis and pneumonia, or symptoms such as sneezing, coughing, vomiting, and loss of consciousness, are believed by some Somalis to result from spirit possession, namely, the Ifrit of the spirit world. The condition is treated by a shaykh, who reads portions of the Qur'an over the patient repeatedly.

Yibir clan members are popularly held to be descendants of Jewish Hebrew forebears. The etymology of the word "Yibir" is also believed by some to have come from the word for "Hebrew". However, spokespersons for the Yibir have generally not tried to make their presence known to Jewish/Israeli authorities. Despite their putative Jewish origins, the overwhelming majority of the Yibir, like the Somali population in general, adhere to Islam and know practically nothing of Judaism.

== Denominations ==
=== Liberal Islam ===
In early January 1975, evoking the message of equality, justice, and social progress contained in the Qur'an, Siad Barre announced a new family law that gave women the right to inheritance on an equal basis with men. Some Somalis believe the law was proof that the SRC wanted to undermine the basic structure of Islamic society. In Mogadishu twenty-three religious leaders protested inside their mosques. They were arrested and charged with acting at the instigation of a foreign power and with violating state security; ten were executed. Sheikh Ahmed Sheikh Mohamed Walaaleeye and Sheikh Hassan Absiye Derie were among them. Most religious leaders, however, kept silent. The government continued to organize training courses for shaykhs in scientific socialism.

=== Sunni ===
For generations, Islam in Somalia mostly leaned towards the Shafi’i jurisprudence, and Sufism. Influence of the Tablighi Jamaat has led to a Hanafi minority as well.

=== Sufism ===
Three Sufi orders were prominent in Somalia. In order of their introduction into the country, they were the Qadiriyah, the Idrisiyah, and the Salihiyya. The Rifaiyah, an offshoot of the Qadiriyah, was represented mainly among Arabs resident in Mogadishu.

==== Qadiriya ====
The Qadiriyah, the oldest Sufi order, was founded in Baghdad by Abdul Qadir al-Jilani in 1166 and introduced to the Somali Adal in the 15th century. During the 18th century, it was spread among the Oromo and the Afar of Ethiopia, often under the leadership of Somali shaykhs. Its earliest known advocate in northern Somalia was Shaykh Abd ar Rahman az Zeilawi, who died in 1883. At that time, Qadiriyah adherents were merchants in the ports and elsewhere. In a separate development, the Qadiriyah order also spread into the southern Somali port cities of Baraawe and Mogadishu at an uncertain date. In 1819, Shaykh Ibrahim Hassan Jebro acquired land on the Jubba River and established a religious center in the form of a farming community, the first Somali jama'ah (congregation).

Outstanding figures of the Qadiriyah in Somalia included Shaykh Awes Mahammad Baraawi (d. 1909), who spread the teaching of the Sufi order in the southern interior. He wrote much devotional poetry in Arabic and attempted to translate traditional hymns from Arabic into Somali, working out his own phonetic system. Another was Shaykh Abdirrahman Abdullah of Mogadishu, who stressed deep mysticism. Because of his reputation for sanctity, his tomb at Mogadishu became a pilgrimage center for the Shebelle valley and his writings continued to be circulated by his followers as late as the early 1990s.

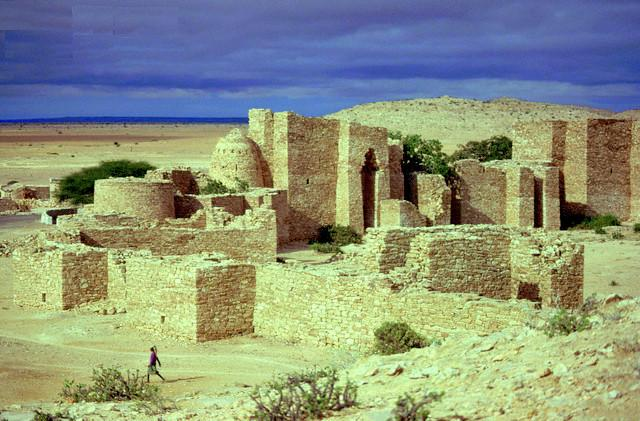
The Dervish fort / Dhulbahante garesa in Taleh.

==== Idrisiya ====
The Idrisiyah order was founded by Ahmad ibn Idris (1760–1837) of Mecca. It was brought to Somalia by Shaykh Ali Maye Durogba of Merca in Somalia, a distinguished poet who joined the order during a pilgrimage to Mecca. His "visions" and "miracles" attributed to him gained him a reputation for sanctity, and his tomb became a popular destination for pilgrims. The Idrisiyah, the smallest of the three Sufi orders, has few ritual requirements beyond some simple prayers and hymns. During its ceremonies, however, participants often go into trances. A conflict over the leadership of the Idrisiyah among its Arab founders led to the establishment of the Salihiyah in 1887 by Muhammad ibn Salih. One of the Salihiyah's proselytizers was former slave Shaykh Mahammad Guled ar Rashidi, who became a regional leader. He settled among the Shidle people (Bantus occupying the middle reaches of the Shebelle River), where he obtained land and established a jama'ah. Later he founded another jama'ah among the Ajuran (a section of the Hawiye clanfamily ) and then returned to establish still another community among the Shidle before his death in 1918.

==== Salihiyya ====
A Somali form of the Salihiya tariqa was established in what is now northern Somalia in 1890 by Ismail Urwayni. Urwayni's proselytism in northern Somalia had a profound effect on the peninsula as it would later prompt the creation of the Darwiish State. The primary friction between the more established Qadiriya and the newly established Somali Salihism in the form of Urwayniya was their reaction to incursions by European colonialists with the former appearing too lax by adherents of the latter. Five years later, another neo-Salihiya figure expedited Urwaynism or Urwayniya through proselytizing, via the Darawiish wherein Diiriye Guure was sultan and wherein the Salihiyya sect preacher Mohammed Abdullah (Sayyid), would become emir of the Dervish state whom opposed incursions into Dervish state territory by the Abyssinian, Italian and British colonialists until 1920.

Generally, the Salihiyah and the Idrisiyah leaders were more interested in the establishment of a jama'ah along the Shabeelle and Jubba rivers and the fertile land between them than in teaching because few were learned in Islam. Their early efforts to establish farming communities resulted in cooperative cultivation and harvesting and some effective agricultural methods. In Somalia's riverine region, for example, only jama'ah members thought of stripping the brush from areas around their fields to reduce the breeding places of tsetse flies.

=== Salafism and Zahirism ===
Following the outbreak of the civil war in the early 1990s, Islamism appeared to be largely confined to the radical Al-Itihaad al-Islamiya group. In 1992, Colonel Abdullahi Yusuf Ahmed marshalled forces to successfully expel an Islamist extremist group linked to the outfit, which had laid siege to Bosaso, a prominent port city and the commercial capital of the northeastern part of the country. The turn of the 21st century saw an increasing prevalence of puritanical Sunnism, including in the form of Muwahhidism and Salafism.

Although there is no official demographic figures on Zahirism in Somalia, many Somalis follow methods of practicing Islam that aligns with Zahiri beliefs, such as a suspicion towards human authority regarding Islamic legal matters.

=== Shia ===
There has never been a comprehensive survey on religious affiliation in Somalia, and as such, figures on adherence are largely based upon speculation. The historian David Westerlund refers to both Shia and Wahhabi (Hanbali madhab) sects in Somalia as relatively recent developments.

Ibn Battuta in his travels to Zeila, in northwest Somalia, in the 14th century, described it as a town of Shiites. The city of Zeila began to gradually lose its Shiite character during the period between 1623 and 1639, when the Ottoman administrators came to increasingly regard the Shiism practised by the local Somali Shiites as heretic due to the ongoing Safavid-Ottoman War against Safi of Persia.

The Saudi invasion of Yemen in 2015 resulted in large amounts of Zaydi Shia Yemeni refugees seeking refuge in northern Somalia.

=== Non-denominational Muslim ===
Although there has never been a comprehensive census in Somalia that lists various Islamic denominations as an option, there have been some Somalis in the diaspora who have used the self-description of "just a Muslim" upon probes into their religious affiliation.

=== Ibadi ===
Ibadism is predominant in Oman and is characterized by the acceptance of fewer hadiths, and the acceptance of Jami Sahih and Tartib al-Musnad as canonical hadith collections. Although Ibadism has not officially been reported being practiced in Somalia, certain Eastern Harti clans who migrated from Somalia in the medieval period whom are known as Dishiishes or Muhdis live in modest numbers in Oman, wherein Ibadism is the state religion.

== See also ==
- Islam by country
- Islamic Court Union
- Religion in Somalia

== Bibliography ==
- Abdurahman, Abdullahi (2017-09-17). Recovering the Somali State: The Role of Islam, Islamism and Transitional Justice. Adonis and Abbey Publishers. ISBN 978-1-909112-62-9.
- Massoud, Mark Fathi (2021). Shari'a, Inshallah: Finding God in Somali Legal Politics. Cambridge University Press. doi:10.1017/9781108965989. ISBN 9781108965989.
- Elmi, Afyare Abdi (2010). Understanding the Somalia Conflagration: Identity, Political Islam and Peacebuilding. Pluto Press. ISBN 9780745329741.
- Cocodia, Jude (2021). "Rejecting African Solutions to African Problems: The African Union and the Islamic Courts Union in Somalia". African Security. 14 (2): 110–131. doi:10.1080/19392206.2021.1922026. S2CID 236350899 – via Taylor & Francis.
- Samatar, Abdi Ismail (March 2007). "Ethiopian Invasion of Somalia, US Warlordism & AU Shame". Review of African Political Economy. 34 (111): 115–165. JSTOR 20406369.
