= Operation Enduring Freedom – Horn of Africa =

Military operation

- Part of Operation Enduring Freedom; War on Terror in the Horn of Africa
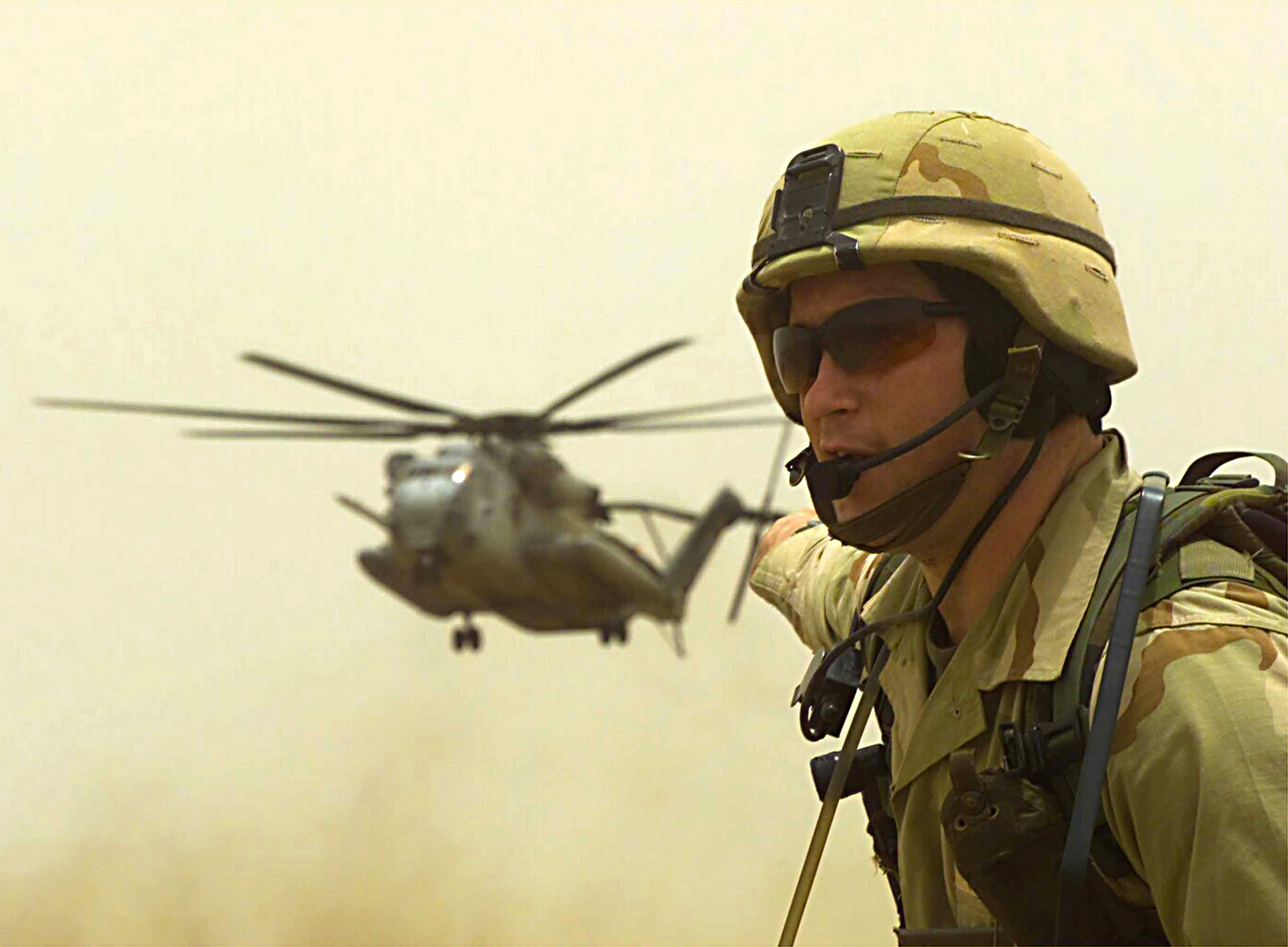
- Marines from the 22nd Marine Expeditionary Unit participate in a long-range deployment exercise from the amphibious assault ship USS Wasp (LHD 1) into Djibouti, August 2002.
Date	2002 — present (under different operational names)
Location	Horn of Africa, Gulf of Aden, Guardafui Channel
Result	21 high level Al-Shabaab leaders killed

Belligerents
United States; United Kingdom; Ethiopia; Somalia; Kenya; Uganda	Insurgents: Islamic State of Iraq and the Levant (from 2015); al-Qaeda (from 2002); Al-Shabaab (from 2006); Islamic Courts Union (2003–09); Hizbul Islam (2009–14); Ras Kamboni Brigades (2007–10); Jabhatul Islamiya (2007–09); Mu'askar Anole (2007–09); Pirates: Somali pirates

Commanders and leaders
(United States) General Tommy Franks (2001–2003) (United States) General John Abizaid (2003–2007) (United States) Admiral William J. Fallon (2007–2008) (United States) General Martin Dempsey (2008–2015) (United States) General David Petraeus (2008–2010)	Ahmad Umar (Islamic State) Abdul Qadir Mumin; Adan Eyrow †; Abu Mansoor*; Abdirahman Godane †; Omar Iman Abubakar*; Hassan Turki †; Mohamed Hayle*; Mukhtar Abu Ali Aisha*; Saleh Ali Saleh Nabhan †; Fazul Mohammed † Garaad Mohamed*; Indho Ade*; Mohamed Garfanji*

Strength
(United States) 500 personnel in Somalia	

Casualties and losses
United States; 2 killed in action, 6 wounded 35 non-combat fatalities (see below)	Islamic insurgents: 1,230–1,367 militants killed in Somalia>: 555+ killed (2017-18); 10 killed (2019) (American operations only)
- 22–37 civilians killed (as of September 2017)(American operations only)

Operation Enduring Freedom – Horn of Africa (OEF-HOA) is a component of Operation Enduring Freedom (OEF).

The Combined Joint Task Force – Horn of Africa (CJTF-HOA) is the primary (but not sole) military component assigned to accomplish the objectives of the mission. The naval component is the multinational Combined Task Force 150 (CTF-150) which operates under the direction of the United States Fifth Fleet. Both of these organizations have been historically part of the United States Central Command. In February 2007, United States president George W. Bush announced the establishment of the United States Africa Command which took over all of the area of operations of CJTF-HOA in October 2008.

CJTF-HOA consists of about 2,000 servicemen and women from the United States military and allied countries. The official area of responsibility comprises Sudan, Somalia, Djibouti, Ethiopia, Eritrea, Seychelles and Kenya. Outside this Combined Joint Operating Area, the CJTF-HOA has operations in Mauritius, Comoros, Liberia, Rwanda, Uganda and Tanzania. The American contribution to the operation, aside from advisers, supplies, and other forms of non-combat support, consists mainly of drone strikes targeted at Al-Shabaab. Other American combat operations include manned airstrikes, cruise missile strikes, and special forces raids.

After the Fall of Kabul in November 2001, there was considerable U.S. Department of Defense concern that Islamist takfiri, jihadis, and others fleeing from Afghanistan might escape south and west to the Arabian Peninsula and East Africa. U.S. Central Command already had responsibility for Yemen. But there were concerns that takfiri militants might escape across the Arabian Sea to East Africa.

As a result, II Marine Expeditionary Force was directed to establish a task force, to be responsible for Yemen and East Africa, to operate from the former French colony of Djibouti. In due course Combined Joint Task Force – Horn of Africa (CJTF-HOA) was established, with its headquarters initially based aboard the command vessel USS Mount Whitney. Its original mission was purely directed against fleeing takfiri militants from Afghanistan and/or other terrorist groups. U.S. forces became increasingly involved in the Somali Civil War. In October 2008, CJTF-HOA became part of the new United States Africa Command.

== Somali civil war ==
In June 2006, The New York Times reported that senior Foreign Service officers at the United States Embassy in Nairobi had criticised the U.S. Central Intelligence Agency's backing of the Somali Alliance for the Restoration of Peace and Counter-Terrorism as short-sighted and counter-productive. A Reuters report said that support of the ARPCT had backfired and destabilized the area. In mid-June 2006, Ethiopian troops began to enter Somalia in large numbers, aiming to remove the Council of Islamic Courts who were then running Mogadishu. This began the next phase of the War in Somalia.

On 1 July 2006, a web-posted message purportedly written by Osama bin Laden urged Somalis to build an Islamic state in the country and warned western states that his al-Qaeda network would fight against them if they intervened there.

On 27 December 2006, The New York Times reported analysts in Nairobi, Kenya claimed U.S. surveillance aircraft were funnelling information to Ethiopian forces. Sean Naylor's Relentless Strike describes U.S. SOF personnel accompanying the invading Ethiopian forces. Somali Prime Minister Ali Mohammed Ghedi declared one of the key objectives of the offensive on Kismayo was the capture of three alleged al-Qaeda members, suspects wanted for the 1998 United States embassy bombings in East Africa: Fazul Abdullah Mohammed, Saleh Ali Saleh Nabhan and Abu Taha al-Sudani.

Task Force 150, a multinational naval task force, was operating off the coast of Somalia to disrupt terrorist activity. At the time, TF 150 included vessels from Canada, France, Germany, Pakistan, the United Kingdom, and the U.S. Arleigh Burke-class destroyer USS Ramage and the Ticonderoga-class cruiser USS Bunker Hill. The aim of the patrols shifted on 2 January 2007, according to diplomats, to "... stop SICC leaders or foreign militant supporters escaping".

Likewise, many airstrikes which resulted in civilian casualties around Afmadow conducted by Ethiopian aircraft were mis-attributed to the United States. On 21 January 2007 the capture of U.S. troops was reported by the Qaadisiya.com site, as well as the death of one due to malaria, but this assertion was denied as "utterly bogus" by Michael Ranneberger, U.S. Envoy to Kenya and Somalia. On 24 January, the U.S. admitted to have made a second airstrike, but did not confirm the exact date or location of the strike. United States involvement in the conflict continued through 2008 with airstrikes targeting suspected Al Qaeda affiliated militants including a strike of dubious success conducted on 2 March 2008 where at least one U.S. naval vessel launched cruise missiles against an Al Qaeda target in a strike on the village of Dobley and a successful strike on Dhusamareb which killed several militant leaders

On 3 January 2007, U.S. Marines operating out of Lamu, Kenya, were reported as assisting Kenyan forces patrolling the border with Somalia with the interception of Islamists. On 8 January it was reported that a U.S. Air Force AC-130 gunship had attacked suspected al-Qaeda operatives in southern Somalia. It was also reported that the aircraft carrier USS Dwight D. Eisenhower had been moved into striking distance. Many bodies were spotted on the ground, but the identity of the dead or wounded was not yet established. The targeted leaders were tracked by the use of unmanned aerial vehicles (UAVs) as they headed south from Mogadishu starting on 28 December. It was reported that the leader of al-Qaeda in East Africa, Fazul Abdullah Mohammed, was killed in the attack, but later officials confirmed that he survived and also that none of the al-Qaeda operatives were killed. However, at least 10 civilians were killed. On 9 January it was reported U.S. special forces and CIA operatives were working with Ethiopian troops on the ground in operations inside Somalia from a base in Galkayo, in Puntland, and from Camp Lemonnier, Djibouti. On 12 January, a small team of U.S. forces investigated the site of the U.S. gunship attack to search for information about the identity and fate of the targeted individuals.

On 17 January 2007, the Assistant Deputy Secretary of Defense for African affairs, Theresa Whelan, clarified the airstrike conducted on 8 January was not the work of the CJTF-HOA, but of another force which she did not specify. The target of the strike was confirmed to be Aden Hashi Farah Ayro, who was believed wounded or possibly dead, while eight members of his group were killed in the attack.

=== Somali Civil War (2009–present) ===
On 28 November 2010 the U.S. Assistant Secretary of State Jendayi Frazer announced that the United States has no intention of committing troops to Somalia to root out al-Qaeda.

On 25 January 2012, two U.S. Navy SEAL teams raided a compound 12 miles (19 km) north of Adado, Galmudug, Somalia, freeing two hostages while killing nine pirates and capturing five others. On 5 October 2013, Naval Special Warfare Development Group SEAL commandos launched an amphibious raid on the town of Baraawe, fighting with al-Shabaab militants and inflicting some casualties on them before withdrawing.

On 5 March 2016, U.S. airstrikes carried out by aircraft and unmanned drones killed more than 150 Al-Shabaab terrorists at a terrorist training camp called "Camp Raso", located about 120 miles north of Mogadishu as they were completing "training for a large-scale attack" according to a Pentagon spokesman. The camp had been under surveillance for some time before the strike. In the early hours of 9 March 2016, U.S. special forces and Somali National Army special forces killed between 1 and 15 Al-Shabaab terrorists in a heliborne-attack on the Al-Shabaab-controlled town of Awdhegele, as well as capturing an undisclosed number of high-value Al-Shabaab figures. The militants were training for a major operation. On 11/12 April 2016, two U.S. airstrikes on Al-Shabaab targets in the town of Kismayo killed about a dozen suspected militants who posed an "imminent threat" to U.S. troops in the country.

As of May 2016, roughly 50 U.S. special operations troops operate at undisclosed locations across southern Somalia, with their headquarters at the airport in Mogadishu; advising and assisting Somali and AMISOM Kenyan and Ugandan forces in their fight against Al-Shabaab. The same month, U.S. personnel helped those forces plan an operation against illegal checkpoints. On 13 May, a U.S. strike targeted nine al-Shabab militants, three of them were allegedly killed. Then the Department of Defense conducted an airstrike that killed a senior Al-Shabaab leader in Somalia on 27 May (announced 1 June 2016). On 3 August 2016, a contingent of elite American troops acting as military advisers assisted Somali commandos in an assault on an al-Shabaab checkpoint in Saakow. As the force approached the checkpoint, the militants opened fire, and 3 militants were killed. On 26 September a small team of U.S. and Somali troops, who were conducting an operation near Kismayo, were attacked with small-arms fire. A bomb-manufacturing network linked to al-Shabaab was reportedly the initiator, reported the Military Times on 29 September 2016. The Department of Defense "conducted a self-defense strike to neutralize the threat and in doing so killed nine enemy fighters." Also on 28 September, near the town of Galkayo, a Somali army unit reportedly came under fire from al-Shabab militants. The Somali soldiers engaged them, then broke contact and rejoined with their nearby American advisers and soon afterwards the militants "began to maneuver in an offensive manner" so the U.S. conducted a self-defense airstrike, killing 4 militants.

==== Drone attacks ====
- In December 2009 the U.S. Department of Defense launched a series of cruise missiles against targets associated with al-Qaeda in the Arabian Peninsula (AQAP) in Yemen. The strikes were reportedly codenamed Operation Copper Dune. On 17 December, cruise missiles were launched on the village of Al-Maʽjalah and a house in Arhab district, near the capital of Sanaa. On 24 December, another cruise missile targeted Rafd, a remote village in Shabwah Governorate. The attacks were the first military operations launched by the US in Yemen since the 2002 Marib airstrike as well as the first during the Presidency of Barack Obama. They marked the start of a prolonged American military campaign against AQAP.
- On 25 June 2011, U.S. Predator drones attacked a Shabaab training camp south of Kismayo. Ibrahim al-Afghani, a senior al Shabaab leader was rumored to be killed in the strike.
- On 6 September 2011, a U.S. drone struck a large Al-Shabaab base, killing 35 militants.
- A drone strike on 17 September killed 17 militants.
- A U.S. drone strike occurred near Mogadishu on 21 January 2012, killing British al-Qaeda operative Bilal el-Berjawi.
- 4 Al-Shabaab fighters, including a white Kenyan and a Moroccan jihadist named Abu Ibrahim, were killed in a drone strike in the K60 area (60 miles south of Mogadishu) of the Lower Shabelle region in southern Somalia late on 24 February 2012.

== Naval actions against piracy ==
Piracy off the coast of Somalia presented a hazard to all shipping in the Gulf of Aden and down the coast of East Africa. It began to escalate after the 2004 Indian Ocean earthquake and tsunami which heavily impacted livelihoods along the coast of southern Somalia.

CJTF-HOA is primarily an air and land task force. It did not control naval actions against piracy, which fell under U.S. Naval Forces Central Command (NAVCENT). The Combined Maritime Forces, under the direction of NAVCENT, directed Combined Task Force 150, and Combined Task Force 151. Pakistan joined CTF 150.

The European Union Military Staff directed the EU anti-piracy Operation Atalanta. NATO later ran Operation Ocean Shield.

Independent anti-piracy operations were conducted off the coast of Somalia by other countries such as China, Russia and India.

== See also ==
- Al-Qaeda insurgency in Yemen
- Terrorism in Yemen
- Baraawe raid
- Manhunt (military)
