= List of wars involving Uganda =

The following is a list of wars involving Uganda.

Conflict	Combatant 1	Combatant 2	Results	President	Ugandan losses
Rwenzururu Uprising (1962–1982)	Uganda	Rwenzururu Movement	Victory: Peace treaty signed in 1982	Mutesa II of Buganda	Unknown
Simba Rebellion (1963–1965)	Simba rebels: Gbenye-Olenga faction; Soumialot faction; Kabila-Massengo faction; Rwandan exile groups Uganda; Sudan Foreign support: Soviet Union; Cuba; Tanganyika^{b}; China; Burundi; Egypt; Algeria	Democratic Republic of the Congo^{a.} Belgium; United States; Anyanya; Banyamulenge militias (1965)	Democratic Republic of the Congo Government victory	Mutesa II of Buganda	Unknown
First Sudanese Civil War (1965–1972)	(Egypt) Anglo-Egyptian Sudan (1955–1956); Republic of the Sudan (1956–1969); Democratic Republic of the Sudan (1969–1972); Combat support: Uganda (Joint operations on Ugandan territory, 1965–1969); Libyan Arab Republic (From 1969 and combat involvement at least in 1970); Non-combat support: United Arab Republic; Soviet Union; United Kingdom; China; Yugoslavia; East Germany; Czechoslovakia; Saudi Arabia; Kingdom of Libya (until 1969); Algeria; United States; West Germany	SDF mutineers, bandits, and unaffiliated separatist militias ALF (1965–1970); Anyanya (from 1963); Israel (from 1969); Supported by: Ethiopia; Uganda (from about 1970) (Democratic Republic of the Congo) Congo-Léopoldville; Kenya; France	Stalemate	Mutesa II of Buganda	Unknown
Mengo Crisis (1966)	Uganda (Obote loyalists)	Buganda (Mutesa II loyalists)	Regime change: Milton Obote becomes president	Mutesa II of Buganda	200+
1972 invasion of Uganda (1972)	Uganda; Libya; Palestine Liberation Organization (PLO)	Ugandan rebels: People's Army; UPC supporters; Tanzania	Ugandan government victory	Idi Amin	Unknown
Arube uprising (1974)	Ugandan government	(Uganda) Putschists	Government victory: Purge in the Uganda Army; Several concessions are made to coup sympathizers, including the appointment of Mustafa Adrisi as army chief of staff	Idi Amin	100+
Operation Entebbe (1976)	PFLP–EO; Revolutionary Cells; Uganda	Israel; Supported by: Kenya	Israeli victory: 102 of 106 hostages rescued; ~25% of Uganda's military aircraft destroyed; 102 of 106 hostages rescued	Idi Amin	45
Uganda–Tanzania War (1978–1979)	Uganda; Libya; Palestine Liberation Organization; Supported by: Pakistan; Saudi Arabia	Tanzania; Uganda National Liberation Front: Kikosi Maalum; Front for National Salvation; Save Uganda Movement; Others; Mozambique; Supported by: Zambia; Angola; Ethiopia; Algeria	Tanzanian victory; Collapse of the Second Republic of Uganda	Idi Amin	~1,650
Ugandan Bush War (1980–1986)	(Uganda) Ugandan government: UNLF/UPC; FEDEMU (from 1985); FUNA (from 1985); UNRF (I) (from 1985); UFM (from 1985); Tanzania (until 1985); North Korea (1981–1985); Zaire (1986, alleged)	National Resistance Movement (NRM): PRA; UFF; (Uganda) West Nile rebels: Uganda Army (1980); UNRF (I) (1980–85); FUNA (1980–85); Nile Regiment; (Uganda) UFM (1980–83) (Uganda) FEDEMU (1983–85) (Uganda) ULM (Uganda) UNLF-AD Rwenzururu movement (until 1982); Karamojong groups	NRM victory: civil war de facto continues	Milton Obote	~100,000– 500,000
Kenyan–Ugandan border conflict	Uganda; Mwakenya Movement	Kenya; NOM	Return to the status quo ante bellum: Kenya–Uganda relations strained	Yoweri Museveni	
War in Uganda (1986–1994)	Uganda (NRM government): NRA; Local Defence Units (LDU); Arrow Boys; Supported by: North Korea	UPDA; UPA; HSM (Auma); HSM (Lukoya); HSM (Ojuk); UUGM; HSM (Kony), UHSA, UPDCA, LA, LRA; FOBA; NALU; WNBF; FUNA; UNDA, UFA; NOM; Tablighi Jamaat militants (including UMFF); Supported by: Zaire (only western rebels); Kenya (Note: Kenya was accused by the Ugandan government of supporting Ugandan rebels. In addition, border clashes between the two countries took place in 1987 and 1989.); Sudan	Ugandan government mostly suppresses rebel activity: UPDA, HSM, UPA, FOBA and UNDA mostly or completely defeated; Some rebel groups, including the LRA, continue their insurgencies	Yoweri Museveni	High civilian losses
LRA Insurgency (1987–)	Uganda; Zaire (until 1997); DR Congo (from 1997); Central African Republic (from 2008); South Sudan; Arrow Boys; UFDR (United Nations) MONUC; Russia (since April 2024): Wagner Group; Supported by: United States (2011–2017) North Korea(until 1990s)	Lord's Resistance Army; Supported by: Sudan (1994–2002); Allied Democratic Forces	Ongoing (Low-level): Founder and leader of the LRA Joseph Kony goes into hiding; Senior LRA commander Dominic Ongwen surrenders to American forces in the Central African Republic and is tried at the Hague; Majority of LRA installations and encampments located in South Sudan and Uganda abandoned and dismantled; Small scale LRA activity continues in eastern DR Congo, and the Central African Republic	Yoweri Museveni	65,000+
Second Sudanese Civil War (1993–2005)	SPLA: SPLA-Mainstream; SPLA-Agar; SPDF; ALF; Titweng; SSLM; NDA; Sudanese Alliance Forces; Anyanya II; Eastern Coalition; FDR Ethiopia (1995–1998); Eritrea (1996–1998, 2002–2005); Uganda (from 1993); Non-combat aid: Libya (1983–1985); Israel; Cuba (until 1991)	Sudan: Armed Forces; PDF; Army of Peace; Muraheleen; (Rwanda) Ex-FAR and Interahamwe; SSDF; SPLA dissidents: SPLA-Nasir; SPLA-United; SSIM/A; Nuer White Army (Uganda) Ugandan insurgents: LRA; WNBF; UNRF (II); Zaire (1994–1997) al-Qaeda (1991–1996); Iraq (Note: Iraqi support for Sudan during the war mostly consisted of weapons shipments; according to the South Sudanese, however, at least one unit of Iraqi paratroopers fought alongside the SAF near Juba. About 200 Iraqi soldiers were allegedly killed, and the site of their remains became known as "Jebel Iraqi". The International Institute for Strategic Studies also stated that Iraqi forces fought alongside Sudanese government troops.); China (Note: Although China was not officially involved in the war, it sent troops to the country in order to protect oil fields and thereby aid the Sudanese military. China also provided Sudan with weaponry.) Combat aid: DR Congo (1998–2003) Non-combat aid: Iran; Belarus (from 1996)	Stalemate	Yoweri Museveni	Unknown
ADF Insurgency (1996–)	Uganda DR Congo: Armed Forces (FARDC); MONUSCO: (United Nations) Force Intervention Brigade	ADF (1996–2015): NALU; ISIL: IS-CAP; ADF-Baluku; ADF-Mukulu: NALU; RCD/K-ML: APC; Mai-Mai Kyandenga (2020–present); Supported by: FARDC elements LRA; Al-Shabaab (disputed); Various Jihadi groups (Ugandan and MONUSCO claim); Sudan (1990s; currently unknown)	Ongoing	Yoweri Museveni	Unknown
First Congo War (1996–1997)	(Democratic Republic of the Congo) AFDL; Rwanda; Uganda; Burundi; Angola (South Sudan) SPLA; Eritrea; Supported by: South Africa; Zambia; Zimbabwe; Ethiopia; Tanzania; United States (covertly) Mai-Mai (Note: Many Mai-Mai militias in eastern Zaire initially allied themselves with Rwanda and the AFDL against Hutu militants and refugees. As soon as most Hutu were driven away, however, many Mai-Mai groups turned against Rwanda and the AFDL. Despite this, some anti-Hutu Mai-Mai remained allied with Rwanda and the AFDL.)	Zaire: FAZ; White Legion; Sudan; Chad (Rwanda) Ex-FAR/ALiR; Interahamwe; CNDD-FDD; UNITA; ADF; FLNC; Supported by: France; Central African Republic; China; Israel; Kuwait (denied) Mai-Mai	AFDL victory: Overthrow of the Mobutu regime; Zaire renamed back to the Democratic Republic of the Congo; Installation of Laurent-Désiré Kabila as president; Beginning of Second Congo War	Yoweri Museveni	Unknown
Second Congo War (1998–2002)	Rwandan-aligned militias: RCD; RCD-Goma; Banyamulenge; Ugandan-aligned militias: MLC; Forces for Renewal; UPC; Other Tutsi-aligned forces; Anti-Angolan forces: UNITA; Foreign state actors: Uganda; Rwanda; Burundi; Libya (alleged)	Pro-government: DR Congo; Angola; Chad; Namibia; Zimbabwe; Sudan (alleged); Anti-Ugandan forces: LRA; ADF; UNRF II; FNI; Anti-Rwandan militias: FDLR; (Rwanda) ALiR; Interahamwe; RDR; Mai-Mai; Other Hutu-aligned forces; Anti-Burundi militias: CNDD-FDD; FROLINA	Military stalemate: Assassination of Laurent-Désiré Kabila; Sun City Agreement; Creation of a unified, multi-party government in DR Congo, with Joseph Kabila as president; Pretoria Accord; Rwandan withdrawal from DR Congo in exchange for commitment towards the disarmament of Hutu militias.; The Transitional Government of the Democratic Republic of the Congo is established, deployment of MONUC.; End of the Angolan Civil War.; Continuation of the Ituri conflict.; Start of the Kivu conflict.	Yoweri Museveni	Unknown
Six-Day War (2000)	Uganda	Rwanda	UN-brokered ceasefire: Rwanda maintains control over Simsimi Airport; Uganda asked by the UN to withdraw north to Bafasende; Capture of Ugandan senior officers, in contravention of the ceasefire	Yoweri Museveni	~2,000
Somali Civil War (2007–)	2007–2009: Insurgency: Ethiopia; (Somalia) TFG; Puntland; Galmudug; Supported by: Malawi; United States; IGASOM: Djibouti; Eritrea; Ethiopia; Kenya; Sudan; Uganda; AMISOM: Burundi; Djibouti; Ethiopia; Ghana; Kenya; Nigeria; Sierra Leone; Uganda; Allied armed groups: (Somalia) ARPCT; ASWJ; (United Nations) UNPOS 2009–present: Somalia; Somali Armed Forces; Regional forces: (Somalia) Ma'awisley; Galmudug; Galmudug Security Force; Ahlu Sunna Waljama'a (until 2018); Himan and Heeb (until 2015); Hirshabelle; Khatumo; Southwestern Somalia; United States: U.S. Army; U.S. Marine Corps; U.S. Air Force; U.S. Navy; CIA; AFRICOM; China: People's Armed Police; AUSSOM (2025–present): Burundi (under discussion); Djibouti; Egypt (under discussion); Ethiopia; Kenya; Uganda; ATMIS (2022–2024): Burundi; Djibouti; Ethiopia; Kenya; Uganda; AMISOM (2007–2022): Burundi; Djibouti; Ethiopia; Ghana; Kenya; Nigeria; Sierra Leone; Uganda; Allies: France; Italy; Russia; Turkey; United Arab Emirates; United Kingdom; Non-combat support: European Union; EUTM Somalia; (United Nations) UNPOS (1995–2013) (United Nations) UNSOM (2013–2024): Brazil; Finland; Germany; Ghana; India; Indonesia; Nepal; Sierra Leone; Sweden; Thailand; Turkey; Uganda; United Kingdom; Zimbabwe; (United Nations) UNTMIS (2025–present) (United Nations) UNSOA (2009–2016) (United Nations) UNSOS (2016–present) Independent regional forces Puntland: Puntland Security Force; Puntland Dervish Force; Puntland Maritime Police Force; Jubaland: Jubaland Dervish Force; Raskamboni Movement	2007–2009: Insurgency: Al-Shabaab; ICU loyalists Hizbul Islam; Ras Kamboni Brigades; Jabhatul Islamiya; Muaskar Anole (Somalia) ARS 2007–2009: Somaliland 2009–present: Al-Qaeda and allies; Al-Shabaab; AQAP; AQIM; Hizbul Islam (until 2010; 2012–2013) Alleged state allies: Eritrea: Iran; Quds Force; Qatar; Alleged non-state allies: Houthis; Somali pirates: Islamic State (since 2015); Somalia Wilayah; Allies; IS-YP; Somali pirates 2009–present: Somaliland; Somaliland Armed Forces; SSB; Alleged support: Ethiopia; UAE; United Kingdom; Yemen; European Union	Ongoing: Ethiopian invasion against the Islamic Courts Union; Conflict between radical Islamists and the government continues; New government formed in 2012; Las Anod conflict between Somaliland and SSC-Khatumo begins in 2023; Ongoing constitutional crisis in Somalia since 2023	Yoweri Museveni	110– 2,700+
South Sudanese Civil War (2013–2015)	South Sudan: SPLA; Air Force; Mathiang Anyoor; Maban Defence Force; Allied militias: SSLM; SRF: JEM (Note: The SPLM-IO accused JEM of supporting Kiir's government since 2013, though JEM has denied any involvement and claims to maintain neutrality in the South Sudanese Civil War. The Sudanese government, aid workers and other sources have however affirmed that JEM is taking part in conflict on the side of the South Sudanese government.); SPLM-N (alleged); SLA-AW; SLA-MM; EUPF (alleged); State allies: Uganda; Egypt (alleged)	(United Nations) UNMISS: (United Nations) Regional Protection Force; Rwanda; Ethiopia; (South Sudan) SPLM-IO; Nuer White Army (South Sudan) SSDM: Cobra Faction (Note: The Cobra Faction openly opposed the government until 2014, and remained in relative opposition until 2015, when it divided into a pro-government and pro-SPLM-IO faction, the latter of which formed the Greater Pibor Forces. In early 2016, the Cobra Faction effectively disbanded, when the remaining group joined the government. In September 2016, however, the Cobra Faction was declared restored by some of its commanders and declared that it had resumed its struggle against the government.); (South Sudan) Agwelek forces; TFNF; SSFDP; South Sudan National Army; NAS; Wau State insurgents SSOA; SSOMA/NSSSOG; Supported by: Sudan (South Sudanese gov. claim)	Stalemate: Uganda withdrawals from conflict; IGAD-negotiated settlement fails	Yoweri Museveni	Unknown
Kasese clashes (2016)	Uganda	Rwenzururu	Ugandan victory	Yoweri Museveni	16

== Sources ==
- Plaut, Martin (2016). Understanding Eritrea: Inside Africa's Most Repressive State. Oxford: Oxford University Press. ISBN 978-0-19-066959-1.
- Prunier, Gérard (July 2004). "Rebel Movements and Proxy Warfare: Uganda, Sudan and the Congo (1986-99)". African Affairs. 103 (412): 359–383. doi:10.1093/afraf/adh050. JSTOR 3518562.
- Prunier, Gérard (2009). Africa's World War: Congo, the Rwandan Genocide, and the Making of a Continental Catastrophe. Oxford: Oxford University Press. ISBN 978-0-19-970583-2.
- Reyntjens, Filip (2009). The Great African War: Congo and Regional Geopolitics, 1996-2006. Cambridge University Press. ISBN 978-0-521-11128-7.
