= Declaration of war by the United States =

Aspect of U.S. law, government, and military

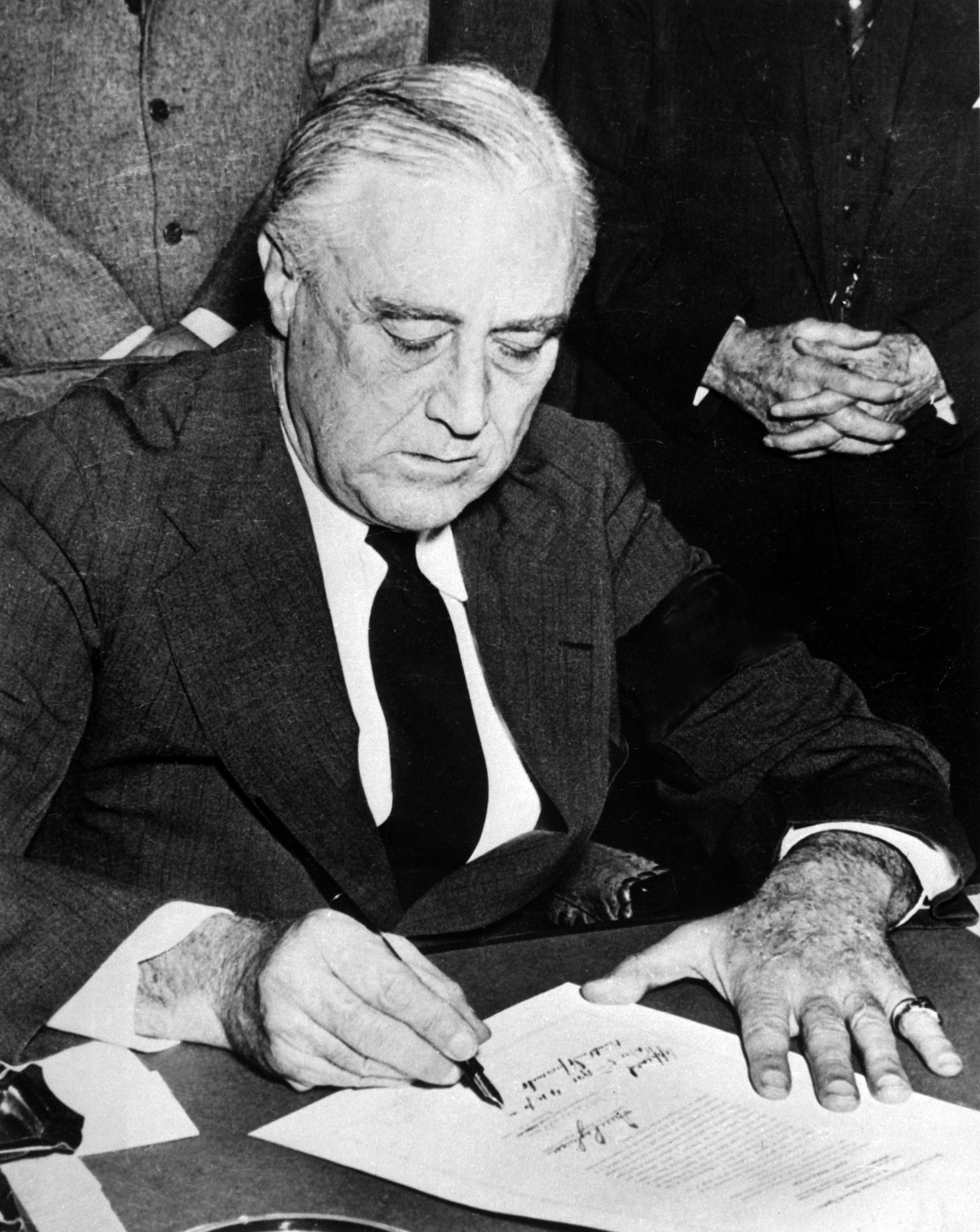
United States president Franklin D. Roosevelt signs the declaration of war against Japan on December 8, 1941

A declaration of war is a formal declaration issued by a national government indicating that a state of war exists between that nation and another. A document by the Federation of American Scientists gives an extensive listing and summary of statutes which are automatically engaged upon the United States' declaring war.

For the United States, Article One, Section Eight of the Constitution says "Congress shall have power to ... declare War." However, that passage provides no specific format for what form legislation must have in order to be considered a "declaration of war" nor does the Constitution itself use this term. In the courts, the United States Court of Appeals for the First Circuit, in Doe v. Bush, said: "[T]he text of the October Resolution itself spells out justifications for a war and frames itself as an 'authorization' of such a war," in effect saying that an authorization suffices for declaration and that what some may view as a formal congressional "declaration of war" was not required by the Constitution.

The last time the United States formally declared war, using specific terminology, on any nation was on June 5, 1942, when war was declared against Axis-aligned Hungary, Bulgaria, and Romania, because President Franklin D. Roosevelt thought it was improper to engage in hostilities against a country without a formal declaration of war. Yet, since then, every American president has used military force without a declaration of war. However, Alexander Hamilton observed in Federalist No. 25 that formal declarations of war were already falling into disuse by 1787.

This article will use the term "formal declaration of war" to mean congressional legislation that uses the phrase "declaration of war" in the title. Elsewhere, this article will use the terms "authorized by Congress," "funded by Congress" or "undeclared war" to describe other such conflicts.

== History ==
The United States has formally declared war against foreign nations in five separate wars, each upon prior request by the president of the United States. Four of those five declarations came after hostilities had begun. James Madison reported that in the Federal Convention of 1787, the phrase "make war" was changed to "declare war" in order to leave to the executive the power to repel sudden attacks but not to commence war without the explicit approval of Congress. Debate continues as to the legal extent of the president's authority in this regard.

Public opposition to American involvement in foreign wars, particularly during the 1930s, was expressed as support for a Constitutional Amendment that would require a national referendum on a declaration of war. Several constitutional amendments, such as the Ludlow Amendment, have been proposed that would require a national referendum on a declaration of war.

After Congress repealed the Gulf of Tonkin Resolution in January 1971 and President Richard Nixon continued to wage war in Vietnam, Congress passed the War Powers Resolution (Pub. L. 93–148) over the veto of Nixon in an attempt to rein in some of the president's claimed powers. The War Powers Resolution prescribes the only power of the president to wage war which is recognized by Congress.

== Declarations of war ==
The United States has formally declared war in five separate conflicts, issuing declarations against ten different foreign nations. The only country to have been the subject of multiple U.S. war declarations is Germany, which the United States formally declared war against twice, once in World War I and again in World War II. A case could also be made for Hungary, as it was a successor state to Austria-Hungary, against which the U.S. declared war in World War I.

=== Formal declarations of war ===
Under the United States Constitution, Congress holds the sole authority to issue formal war declarations. Since the nation's founding, Congress has exercised this power on a limited number of occasions.

The first formal declaration occurred on June 18, 1812, when the United States declared war against the United Kingdom, citing British impressment of American sailors and violations of U.S. neutrality during the Napoleonic Wars. This conflict, known as the War of 1812, concluded with the Treaty of Ghent in 1814.

On May 13, 1846, Congress declared war on Mexico at the request of President James K. Polk, following territorial disputes and military clashes in Texas. The Mexican–American War resulted in the Treaty of Guadalupe Hidalgo (1848), which expanded U.S. territory to include present-day California, Arizona, and other southwestern states.

The Spanish–American War marked another instance of a formal declaration of war. The conflict was precipitated by the sinking of the USS Maine in Havana Harbor and growing tensions over Spanish colonial rule in Cuba. The war ended later that year with the Treaty of Paris (1898), which granted the United States control over former Spanish territories, including Puerto Rico, Guam, and the Philippines.

During World War I, the United States declared war on Germany on April 6, 1917, citing unrestricted submarine warfare and the Zimmermann telegram, in which Germany attempted to persuade Mexico to join the war against the United States. Later that year, on December 7, 1917, Congress also declared war on Austria–Hungary, a German ally. The conflict formally ended for the United States with the signing of separate peace treaties with Germany, Austria, and Hungary in 1921.

World War II saw the most formal war declarations by the United States. Following the attack on Pearl Harbor on December 7, 1941, Congress declared war on Japan the next day, with near-unanimous approval. In response, Nazi Germany and Italy, led by Adolf Hitler and Benito Mussolini, declared war on the United States on December 11, prompting reciprocal declarations by Congress against both nations. In 1942, the United States further declared war on Bulgaria, Hungary, and Romania, all Axis-aligned nations. The war concluded in 1945 with the unconditional surrender of Germany and Japan, followed by formal peace treaties in the years after.

Each of these declarations was issued through a Congressional resolution, signed into law by the president, signifying the commencement of hostilities under the authority of the U.S. government. Since World War II, the United States has engaged in numerous military conflicts, but none have been accompanied by a formal declaration of war. Instead, Congress has authorized the use of military force through resolutions, such as those in Korea, Vietnam, and the war on terror, including conflicts in Afghanistan and Iraq.

War	Opponent	Declaration	Date	Votes		President	Result
War	Opponent	Declaration	Date	Senate	House	President	Result
War of 1812	United Kingdom	United States declaration of war on the United Kingdom	June 17, 1812 (Note: Officially enacted on June 18, 1812)	19–13	79–49	James Madison	Treaty of Ghent
Mexican–American War	Mexico	United States declaration of war on Mexico	May 13, 1846	40–2	174–14	James K. Polk	Treaty of Guadalupe Hidalgo
Spanish–American War	Spain	United States declaration of war on Spain	April 25, 1898	90–0	311–6	William McKinley	Treaty of Paris (1898)
World War I	Germany	United States declaration of war on Germany (1917)	April 6, 1917	82–6	373–50	Woodrow Wilson	U.S.–German Peace Treaty (1921) (Note: The Treaty of Versailles failed to pass the U.S. Senate.)
World War I	Austria-Hungary	United States declaration of war on Austria-Hungary	December 7, 1917	74–0	350–1	Woodrow Wilson	U.S.–Austrian Peace Treaty (1921) (Note: The Treaty of Saint-Germain-en-Laye (1919) failed to pass the U.S. Senate.)
World War II	Japan	United States declaration of war on Japan	December 8, 1941	82–0	388–1	Franklin D. Roosevelt	Treaty of San Francisco
World War II	Germany	United States declaration of war on Germany (1941)	December 11, 1941	88–0	393–0	Franklin D. Roosevelt	German Instrument of Surrender (Note: There was not a single, formal US-German peace treaty, but the United States did officially end its state of war with Germany on October 24, 1951.)
World War II	Italy	United States declaration of war on Italy	December 11, 1941	90–0	399–0	Franklin D. Roosevelt	Treaty of Paris (1947)
World War II	Bulgaria	United States declaration of war on Bulgaria	June 5, 1942	73–0	357–0	Franklin D. Roosevelt	Treaties of Paris (1947)
World War II	Hungary	United States declaration of war on Hungary	June 5, 1942	73–0	360–0	Franklin D. Roosevelt	Treaties of Paris (1947)
World War II	Romania	United States declaration of war on Romania	June 5, 1942	73–0	361–0	Franklin D. Roosevelt	Treaties of Paris (1947)

== Undeclared wars ==
=== Military engagements authorized by Congress ===
In other instances, the United States has engaged in extended military combat that was authorized by Congress.

War or conflict	Opponent(s)	Initial authorization	Votes		President	Details of Authorization	Result
War or conflict	Opponent(s)	Initial authorization	Senate	House	President	Details of Authorization	Result
Quasi-War	France	An Act further to protect the commerce of the United States; July 9, 1798	18–4	Voice vote	John Adams	Adams requested legislation allowing the United States Navy to defend American shipping after repeated attacks by the French Navy during the French Revolutionary Wars.	Treaty of Mortefontaine
First Barbary War	Morocco Tripolitania	"An Act for the Protection of the Commerce and Seamen of the United States, Against the Tripolitan Cruisers", 2 Stat. 129, February 6, 1802			Thomas Jefferson	President Jefferson requested legislation allowing the U. S. Navy to defend shipping in the Mediterranean Sea from Tripolitanian vessels.	War ended 1805
Second Barbary War	Algiers	"An Act for the protection of the commerce of the United States against the Algerine cruisers", 3 Stat. 230, May 10, 1815			James Madison	Madison requested a declaration of war against Algiers citing attacks on U.S. shipping in the Mediterranean. Congress rejected the request for a formal war declaration but ratified legislation allowing the U.S. Navy to defend U.S. commerce.	War ended 1816
Enforcing 1808 slave trade ban; naval squadron sent to African waters to apprehend illegal slave traders	Slave traders	"Act in addition to the acts prohibiting the Slave Trade", 3 Stat. 532, 1819			James Monroe		1822 first African-American settlement founded in Liberia, 1823 U.S. Navy stops anti-trafficking patrols
Suppression of Piracy	Pirates	1819			James Monroe	The United States Congress passed legislation allowing the United States Navy to suppress piracy in response to the rise in piracy in Latin America and the Caribbean after the Spanish American wars of independence, which was later permanently codified as Title 33 of the United States Code.	
Redress for attack on U.S. Navy's USS Water Witch	Paraguay	1858			James Buchanan		
Mexican Revolution: United States occupation of Veracruz	Mexico	H.J.R. 251, 38 Stat. 770; April 22, 1914		337–37	Woodrow Wilson		Force withdrawn after six months. However, the Joint Resolution was likely used to authorize the Pancho Villa Expedition. In the Senate, "when word reached the Senate that the invasion had gone forward before the use-of-force resolution had been approved, Republicans reacted angrily" saying it was a violation of the Constitution, but eventually after the action had already started, a resolution was passed after the action to "justify" it since Senators did not think it was a declaration of war.
Russian Civil War: Allied intervention in the Russian Civil War	Commune of Estonia; Far Eastern Republic; Latvia; Mongolian People's Party; Russia; Ukraine	1918			Woodrow Wilson		
Lebanon crisis of 1958	(Lebanon) Lebanese Opposition: Al-Mourabitoun; Lebanese Communist Party; Progressive Socialist Party	H.J. Res. 117, Public Law 85-7, Joint Resolution "To promote peace and stability in the Middle East", March 9, 1957	72–19	355–61	Dwight D. Eisenhower	Eisenhower requested legislation allowing U.S. economic and military assistance to the Middle East during the Cold War, including the ability to deploy the military in response to threatened Communist takeovers.	U.S. forces withdrawn, October 25, 1958
Vietnam War Laotian Civil War Cambodian Civil War	Mainland China; National United Front of Kampuchea: (Cambodia) Khmer Rouge; Khmer Rumdo; Khmer Việt Minh; North Korea; North Vietnam (Laos) Pathet Lao; South Vietnam: Việt Cộng	Gulf of Tonkin Resolution, August 7, 1964	88–2	416–0	Lyndon B. Johnson	Johnson requested authorization for a military deployment to defend South Vietnam and U.S. military forces already stationed there from under SEATO collective security obligations, citing alleged Vietnam People's Navy attacks on United States Navy warcraft including the USS Maddox in the Gulf of Tonkin incident. Congress responded with the Gulf of Tonkin Resolution.	U.S. forces withdrawn under terms of the Paris Peace Accords signed January 27, 1973
Multinational Force in Lebanon	Shia militias, Druze militias, Syria	S.J.Res. 159; Pub. L. 98–119; September 29, 1983	54–46	253–156	Ronald W. Reagan	Reagan announced the deployment of a small United States Marine Corps contingent of forces for peacekeeping in the Lebanese Civil War, claiming they would supervise the PLO withdrawal from Beirut and provide law enforcement, but not participate in direct combat. After Congress invoked the War Powers Resolution, it and the Reagan administration negotiated a resolution allowing the marines to remain in Lebanon for 18 months.	
Persian Gulf War	Ba'athist Iraq	H.J.Res. 77; January 12, 1991.	52–47	250–183	George H.W. Bush	Bush announced the deployment of 330,000 soldiers to Saudi Arabia in response to the Iraqi invasion of Kuwait and began diplomatic overtures to form an international coalition to defend the Arab states of the Persian Gulf. Congress approved an Authorization for Use of Military Force against Ba'athist Iraq to liberate Kuwait under United Nations Security Council Resolution 678.	The United Nations Security Council drew up terms for the cease-fire, April 3, 1991. The administration of George W. Bush later argued that the AUMF never expired during the build-up to the Iraq War. Repealed under the National Defense Authorization Act for Fiscal Year 2026.
War on terror	Afghanistan: Quetta Shura; Taliban; Haqqani network; Mullah Dadullah Front; al-Qaeda: 055 Brigade; Al-Nusra Front; Khorasan group; al-Qaeda Emirate in Yemen; Aden-Abyan Islamic Army; Islamic Jihad of Yemen; al-Qaeda in the Arabian Peninsula; Ansar al-Sharia; al-Qaeda in the Indian Subcontinent; Lashkar al-Zil; Harakat Ahrar al-Sham al-Islamiyya; Hezb-e Islami Gulbuddin; Islamic Jihad Union; Islamic Movement of Uzbekistan; Jamaat-ul-Ahrar; Jundallah; Lashkar-e-Islam; Lashkar-e-Jhangvi; Tehreek-e-Nafaz-e-Shariat-e-Mohammadi; Turkistan Islamic Party; Tehrik-i-Taliban Pakistan (Afghanistan) High Council of the Islamic Emirate; Fidai Mahaz al-Itihaad al-Islamiya; Alliance for the Re-liberation of Somalia; Harakat al-Shabaab Mujahedeen; Hizbul Islam; Islamic Courts Union; Jabhatul Islamiya; Mu'askar Anole; Ras Kamboni Brigades Abu Sayyaf; Bangsamoro Islamic Freedom Fighters; Islamic State; Islamic Movement of Uzbekistan; Maute group Khalifa Islamiyah Mindanao	S.J. Res. 23; September 14, 2001	98–0	420–1	George W. Bush	Bush successfully requested a congressional authorizing the president of the United States to use military force against "those nations, organizations, or persons he determines planned, authorized, committed, or aided the terrorist attacks that occurred on September 11, 2001" as well as governments which sheltered them such as the First Islamic Emirate of Afghanistan. It also allowed the president to use force to prevent future acts of terrorism. Since then the authorization has been invoked in conflicts in 22 countries against the original perpetrator of 9/11 al-Qaeda as well as other organizations such as Al-Shabaab, the Taliban, and the Islamic State. The authorization is also notable in that it delegated war powers related to terrorism from Congress to the president, and allowed the United States to make war against individuals and organizations in addition to sovereign states. The Supreme Court ruled in Hamdi v. Rumsfeld that the authorization enabled the president to detain individuals, including U.S. citizens, as enemy combatants, although it granted detainees to challenge this status in U.S. courts and further ruled in Hamdan v. Rumsfeld that they were protected by laws of war such as the Geneva Conventions and the Uniform Code of Military Justice.	The Global War on Terror is ongoing. The War in Afghanistan (2001–2021), that was carried out by the United States under the Global War on Terror's general authorization for use of military force, came to an end on August 30, 2021 with the total withdrawal of the American Forces from Afghanistan under the terms of the Doha Peace Agreement signed on February 29, 2020. The U.S. disengagement from Afghanistan resulted in the Fall of Kabul to the Taliban on August 15, 2021 and in a broad re-establishment of the status quo ante bellum. The U.S. backed Islamic Republic of Afghanistan collapsed even before the completion of the American withdrawal, and the Taliban victory led to the restoration of the Islamic Emirate of Afghanistan. Other U.S. military campaigns that are legally based on the Global War on Terror's general authorization for use of military force include the ongoing American-led intervention in the Syrian civil war that was initiated on September 22, 2014 under President Barack Obama's administration. In spite of a significant drawdown of U.S. ground forces in Syria at the direction of President Donald Trump in 2019, the United States retains a residual presence of about 600 military personnel in Syria, and continues to conduct airstrikes against Iranian-supported militias as of 2021. The United States House of Representatives voted to repeal the 2001 AUMF in 2021.
Iraq War	Ba'athist Iraq	H.J. Res. 114, March 3, 2003	77–23	296–132	George W. Bush	During the Iraq disarmament crisis Bush successfully requested an authorization of military force against Iraq alleging violations of United Nations Security Council resolutions including the ceasefire with Kuwait, illegal weapons of mass destruction programs, and the sheltering of al-Qaeda members in the country. The Bush administration also claimed that the conflict was sanctioned by the 1991 AUMF against Iraq and by the Iraq Liberation Act of 1998 designating the overthrow of Saddam Hussein's dictatorship as a goal of U.S. foreign policy.	Ba'athist Iraqi government abolished April 2003, Saddam Hussein executed. War ended December 15, 2011. Destabilization of Iraq and emergence of ISIL (ISIS) in Iraq region 2014–2017. During the 2019–2021 Persian Gulf crisis, President Donald Trump cited the AUMF in its assassination of Qasem Soleimani. Repealed under the National Defense Authorization Act for Fiscal Year 2026.

=== Military engagements authorized by United Nations Security Council Resolutions and funded by Congress ===
In many instances, the United States has engaged in extended military engagements that were authorized by United Nations Security Council Resolutions and funded by appropriations from Congress.

Military engagement	Opponent(s)	Initial authorization	President	Result
Korean War	China; North Korea; Soviet Union	UNSCR 84, 1950	Harry S. Truman	Korean Armistice Agreement, 1953
Multinational Force in Lebanon	Shia militias, Druze militias, Syria	UNSCR 425, 1978 UNSCR 426, 1978	Jimmy Carter, Ronald Reagan	U.S. forces withdrew in 1984
Persian Gulf War	Iraq	UNSCR 678, 1990	George H. W. Bush	UNSCR 689, 1991
Bosnian War	Republika Srpska	UNSCR 770, 1992; UNSCR 776, 1992; UNSCR 836, 1993	Bill Clinton	Reflagged as IFOR in 1995, Reflagged as SFOR in 1996, Completed in 2004
Second Liberian Civil War	N/A (Peacekeeping)	UNSCR 1497, 2003	George W. Bush	U.S. forces are withdrawn in 2003 after the UNMIL is established.
Haitian coup d'état	N/A (Peacekeeping)	UNSCR 1529, 2004 UNSCR 1542, 2004	George W. Bush	2004
First Libyan Civil War: 2011 military intervention in Libya; Operation Odyssey Dawn; Operation Unified Protector	Libya	UNSCR 1973, 2011	Barack Obama	Debellation of the Libyan Arab Jamahiriya, October 31, 2011

=== Other undeclared wars ===
On at least 125 occasions, the president has acted without prior express military authorization from Congress. These include instances in which the United States fought in the Philippine–American War from 1898 to 1903, in Nicaragua in 1927, as well as the NATO bombing campaign of Yugoslavia in 1999, and the 2018 missile strikes on Syria.

The Indian Wars comprise at least 28 conflicts and engagements. These localized conflicts, with Native Americans, began with European colonists coming to North America, long before the establishment of the United States. For the purpose of this discussion, the Indian Wars are defined as conflicts with the United States of America. They begin as one front in the American Revolutionary War in 1775 and had concluded by 1918. The United States Army still maintains a campaign streamer for Pine Ridge 1890–1891 despite opposition from certain Native American groups.

The American Civil War was not an international conflict under the laws of war, because the Confederate States of America (CSA) was not a government that had been granted full diplomatic recognition as a sovereign nation by other sovereign states or by the government of the United States. As such, the statutory authority for the use of the military during the American Civil War was the Insurrection Act of 1807. (Note: See also: Proclamation 80, the Union blockade, the Prize Cases, and List of invocations of the Insurrection Act.)

The U.S. briefly joined the Twelve-Day War between Israel and Iran on the night of June 22, 2025, without a declaration of war or congressional approval. On February 28, 2026, the U.S. and Israel jointly launched airstrikes on Iran, killing several Iranian officials, including Supreme Leader Ali Khamenei, without a declaration of war or congressional approval.

== War Powers Resolution ==
On March 21, 2011, a number of lawmakers expressed concern that the decision of President Barack Obama to order the U.S. military to join in attacks of Libyan air defenses and government forces exceeded his constitutional authority because the decision to authorize the attack was made without congressional permission.

== See also ==
- Cold War
- Declaration of war by Canada
- Declaration of war by the United Kingdom
- Just war theory
- Police action
- Timeline of United States military operations
- War on drugs

== Sources ==
- Elsea, Jennifer K.; Weed, Matthew C. (April 18, 2014). Declarations of War and Authorizations for the Use of Military Force: Historical Background and Legal Implications (Report). Congressional Research Service.
