= Battle of Kismayo =

Battle of Kismayo may refer to:

- Fall of Kismayo (2007), an offensive by the Somali National Army and Ethiopian forces against Islamic Courts Union (ICU) fighters
- Battle of Kismayo (2008), an offensive begun by Islamist al-Shabaab and ICU fighters
- Battle of Kismayo (2009), an offensive begun by Sheikh Ahmed "Madobe" and his Ras Kamboni Brigade forces
- Battle of Kismayo (2012), an offensive led by Somali National Army forces and AMISOM allies
