= Abdirahnam Ibrahim Maʼow =

Somali politician

Abdirahnam Ibrahim Maʼow became de facto Islamist Governor of Hiran region and a member of the ruling Union of Islamic Courts (UIC) in January 2009. In July 2009 he quit the Somali interim government and joined Hizbul Islam rebels.

Until Maʼow gleaned support from Sharif Sheikh Ahmed (a fellow ICU leader), the region had been hostile to the TFG. Part of Beledweyne was under his control so when government forces attacked it, Maʼow withdrew his administration's support for the TFG. In September 2009 he became an official member of Hisbul Islam and also announced that his administration does not recognize the TFG. Maʼow is also Chairman of the Council of Islamic Courts.
