= Hassan Dahir Aweys =

Somali militant

- الشيخ حسن ضاهر أويس

Chairman of the Shura Council of the Islamic Courts Union
- In office 24 June 2006 – 27 December 2006
- Deputy: Omar Imam Abubakar
- Preceded by: Position established
- Succeeded by: Position abolished

Personal details
- Born: 1935 (age 90–91) Dusmareb, Italian Somaliland
- Children: 11
- Education: General Daud Military Academy

Military service
- Allegiance: Somali Democratic Republic (1972–1983); Al-Itihaad al-Islamiya (1989–1997); Islamic Courts Union (2000–2007); Hizbul Islam (2009–2010)
- Rank: Colonel
- Battles/wars: Ogaden War; Somali Civil War; Ethiopian invasion of Somalia

Hassan Dahir Aweys (Somali: Xasan Daahir Aweys, Arabic: حسن طاهر أويس; born 1935) is a Somali Islamist political figure.

During the regime of Siad Barre, Aweys was a colonel in the Somali National Army and served in the 1977 Ogaden War against Ethiopia. He later came to be a leading figure in Somalia's rising Islamic movements at the start of the Civil War, beginning with Al-Itihaad al-Islamiya from 1991. After the effective dissolution of Al-Itihaad in 1997, he became the head of an Islamic Court in north Mogadishu and eventually rose to a high-ranking position within the Islamic Courts Union until the Ethiopian invasion of 2006.

Following the invasion he joined the Alliance for the Re-Liberation of Somalia in late 2007 and became head of the Asmara wing of the ARS. During the insurgency, his wing of the alliance merged with several groups to form Hizbul Islam.

In 2010, Hizbul Islam and Al-Shabaab merged, but disputes between Aweys and the Al-Shabaab leadership would result in several attempts on his life and his eventual defection to the internationally recognized Federal Government of Somalia in 2013.

== Early life ==
Aweys was born in the city of Dhusamareb, Galguduud region, in central Somalia. He is part of the Ayr wing of the Habr Gidir, a major sub-clan of the Hawiye. In 1963 he moved to Mogadishu and went to secondary school. He later joined the Somali National Army (SNA) and went to 'General Daud military academy' in 1972, from which he graduated. Aweys rose to the rank of Colonel and was decorated with a silver medal for bravery during the 1977–1978 Ogaden War against Ethiopia.

== Al-Itihaad al-Islamiya (1991–1997) ==
Following the collapse of the Somali government, Aweys joined al-Itihaad al-Islamiya (AIAI) in 1991. He eventually became vice chairman and military commander of the organization, appointed by AIAI leader and his brother-in-law Sheikh Ali Warsame. During fighting between AIAI and an Ethiopian backed Somali Salvation Democratic Front (SSDF) force led by Abdullahi Yusuf, Aweys captured and arrested Yusuf at an early stage of the clashes, though AIAI was eventually routed. From 1991 to 1998, AIAI's Gedo Region branch led by former Somali High Court Judge Mohamed Haji Yusuf maintained formidable forces. Gedo district seats of Lugh, Balad Hawo and Burdubo were all run by AIA forces. Lugh was entirely governed by AIAI. At the time, there were other regional military authority Somali National Front (SNF) running parts of Gedo. Sheikh Aweys settled in Lower Shabelle when some disputes came of light in Lugh's Al-Itahad leadership.

On 18 September 1996, the Ethiopian army invaded Lugh and forced out most of the AIAI forces. The following two years, the war front changed into what was later to become the Mountains War of Gedo. And the war this time was between SNF and AIAI. The Gedo war ended when both sides agreed on a truce, and general peace with a peace conference held in El Ade in December 1998 was concluded.

Following the start of America's War on terror, on 7 November 2001, Aweys was named a 'supporter of terrorism' in a supplement of Executive Order 13224 of United States President George W. Bush. He was placed on the terrorist list of the United States Department of State as somebody who is either a known al-Qaeda operative or who is connected. Aweys has always maintained the American terror allegations to be false in interviews with international press.

== Islamic Courts Union (2000–2006) ==
After the defeat of AIAI Aweys played a key role in setting up a system of courts according to the shari'a by local businessmen desperate for order. According to the BBC he was the ICU's spiritual leader. The Courts brought relative stability to areas under its control, after years of turmoil. The Courts' notion of order was strict, including stonings for serious crimes such as rape. At first it only controlled the area of north Mogadishu, but it gained support from many Somali's following the random violence committed by the warlords who controlled southern Mogadishu. Beginning 2004, eleven of these courts folded into an umbrella organization, the Islamic Courts Union, which fielded a formidable militia. A UN report in early 2006 stated that Aweys was receiving military support from Eritrea, as part of the ongoing conflict between it and Ethiopia, though Eritrea denies the claim. According to independent military experts, Aweys training and strategy had given the ICU forces the edge they required to rout the warlords.

Following the ICU's victory in Mogadishu in June 2006, Aweys became the head of the 90-member shura council of the Islamic Courts Union (ICU) of Somalia and according to the BBC was viewed as one of the more radical leaders of the Union, which promoted shari'a and directed the militias that took control of the Somali capital of Mogadishu in June 2006. The BBC also mention that an eight-member executive committee was headed by the more moderate Sharif Sheikh Ahmed. Aweys stated in an interview with Agence France Presse that the Islamic Courts didn't seek conflict with the United States and that, "We would like to work with them if they respect us and stop interfering with Somali internal affairs," Aweys firmly supported the establishment of an Islamic government in Somalia but rejected comparisons to the Taliban. In an interview with The Telegraph, he stated,

“We are not the Taliban, and we should be given some credit for what we have done... We don't want labels, we want help.”

On 19 December 2006, he received medical treatment in Egypt just before the full scale Ethiopian invasion of Somalia began. According to Voice of America, Aweys left Mogadishu on 27 December 2006. The city fell to the Ethiopian army the following day.

== Insurgency (2007–2013) ==
Aweys became a member of the Alliance for the Re-liberation of Somalia (ARS) in 2007. In a May 2008 statement in the Eritrean capital of Asmara during the Ethiopian military occupation, he told The Guardian:

"Bush calls everyone who is against him a terrorist. It is a meaningless word. The al-Qaida allegation is a false allegation...Every country has the right to fight for its freedom. If the United Kingdom was invaded, would the British people not fight the invaders? We are going to liberate Somalia from Ethiopia. Then we will form a government of national unity."

=== 2009–2010: Hizbul Islam ===
In early 2009, four major rebel groups, Sheikh Aweys' Asmara-based wing of the ARS, Hassan Abdullah Hersi al-Turki's Ras Kamboni Brigade, Jabhatul Islamiya and Muaskar Anole joined to form a new group called Hizbul Islam, to oppose the new government of President Sharif Sheikh Ahmed. Although the group was initially led by Omar Iman Abubakar, he stepped down on 26 May 2009 in favour of Sheikh Aweys taking the position of chairman. On 23 April 2009, Sheikh Aweys returned to Somalia from Eritrea. He made clear that he would not meet Sheikh Sharif saying: "Mr Sharif's government was not elected by the Somali people and it is not representing the interests the Somali people"

On 9 May 2009, Hizbul Islam and Al Shabaab tried to topple the government of Sharif Sheikh Ahmed by opening the 2009 Battle of Mogadishu, which lasted for months, in which the Islamists managed to gain territory but failed ultimately to topple the regime. Mogadishu residents reported that they saw foreign fighters in the frontline of the battle, raising concerns that Somalia may become the next terrorist safe haven after Iraq and Afghanistan. In June 2009, it was rumoured he had been killed during the Battle of Wabho. He later dismissed reports that he was killed or heavily injured. After the Battle of Kisimayo (2009) the group was involved in an unsuccessful power-struggle with al-Shabaab in which Hizbul Islam was ultimately forced to surrender, after which they merged with al-Shabaab on 20 December 2010 under the banner of al-Shabaab, dropping the name Hizbul Islam.

=== 2010–2013: Al-Shabaab ===
Aweys was involved in the power struggle between Mukhtar Robow (Abu Mansoor) and Mukhtar Abu Zubayr (Godane), during which he supported Abu Mansoor in demanding that Godane would step down as the group's Emir. Aweys had been described as Hizbul Islam's political and spiritual leader.

== Defection and house arrest ==
In June 2013, Aweys defected to the government and was taken into custody by Somali security forces, denoting the victory of the hardliners in al-Shabaab. However, there was speculation in The Economist Newspaper the nature of his arrest, initially being promised talks with government officials and then being roughed up by soldiers when arrested instead, created concern that it could have caused the Hawiye clan of the president Hassan Sheikh Mohamud and Aweys to split.
