= Raskamboni Movement =

Jihadist Islamic movement in Somalia and Kenya founded in 2009

- Leaders: Sheikh Ahmed Madobe (Chairman); Maalim Mohamud (Deputy Chairman)
- Dates active: Since 7 October 2009
- Group: Ogaden
- Headquarters: Kismayo
- Active regions: Jubaland
- Ideology: Islamism; Pan-Islamism; Jihadism
- Size: <1,000 (2010)
- Wars: Somali Civil War

The Raskamboni Movement (Somali: Xarakada Raaskambooni) is a jihadist Islamic movement led by Sheikh Ahmed Madobe, the current president of the Jubaland state in southern Somalia. After fighting with Al-Shabaab they managed to capture Kismayo with the help of Kenya.

== History ==
Alliance for the Reliberation of Somalia - Asmara wing (ARS-A) and JABISO militias, which were aligned with al-Shabaab in Hiiraan and Mogadishu refused to support the Ras Kamboni Brigades, meanwhile Muaskar Anole remained neutral. The fighting led to a split within the Ras Kamboni Brigades, with a faction led by Ahmed Madoobe fighting against al-Shabaab and a faction led by Hassan al-Turki siding with al-Shabaab.

The Battle of Kismayo was won by al-Shabaab, which then expelled Madobe's Ras Kamboni Brigades from the city. In the battles that followed, in November 2009, Madobe's forces were overpowered by al-Shabaab and its local allies. It was then forced to withdraw from the Lower Juba region and most of southern Somalia. In February 2010, al-Turki's branch declared a merger with al-Shabaab.

On 20 December 2010, Hizbul Islam merged with al-Shabaab and the Raskamboni movement then allied with Ahlu Sunna Waljama'a and the Transitional Federal Government.

The Raskamboni engaged al-Shabab militiamen on March 13, 2011, in the village of Dif. The movement claimed to have destroyed a number of Al-Shabaab military vehicles in the fighting, which left at least five dead.

On April 3, 2011, the Raskamboni movement, in conjunction with Transitional Federal Government forces and the Kenyan Air Force, captured the border town Dhobley from Al-Shabab.

In July 2012, it was reported that they staged a rescue operation to free four kidnapped aid workers from the Norwegian Refugee Council.

In September 2012, a reconstituted Somali National Army assisted by AMISOM troops and Raskamboni militia reportedly re-captured Kismayo from Al-Shabaab insurgents during the Battle of Kismayo (2012).

In February 2014, Al-Shabaab militants launched a string of attacks in Kismayo targeting Raskamboni members, including an IED that tore through a vehicle carrying the group's members and killed several civilians. On 19 February, Raskamboni militants began an intensive search operation in the city after the group's security chief, Isse Kamboni, was shot dead by one of his bodyguards, a former Al-Shabaab member. According to eye-witnesses, Raskamboni subsequently started hunting down Al-Shabaab suspects. Many Raskomboni fighters were seen patrolling the streets, and more than 150 civilians were detained at the local police stations in connection with Isse's assassination. Seven civilian deaths were also reported during the clampdown with some accusing the militia of using the clampdown as an excuse to stifle dissent. Hundreds of elders and businessmen had earlier fled the city.

== See also ==
- Private military company in Somalia
