= Ahmed Abdi Godane =

First leader of Al-Shabaab (2008–2014)

- Axmed Cabdi Godane أحمد عبدي جودان
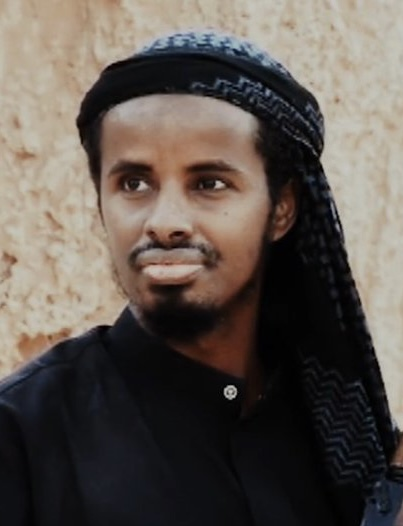
- Godane in an undated video released after his death

Emir of Harakat al-Shabaab al-Mujahideen
- In office 2008 – 1 September 2014
- Preceded by: Aden Hashi Farah Ayro
- Succeeded by: Ahmad Diri

Personal details
- Born: 10 July 1977 Hargeisa, Somaliland
- Died: 1 September 2014 (aged 37) near Barawa, Somalia
- Nickname: Mukhtar Abu Zubayr

Military service
- Allegiance: Islamic Courts Union (2003–2007) al-Qaeda: al-Shabaab (2007–2014)
- Years of service: 2003–2014
- Rank: Emir of Al Shabaab
- Battles/wars: Somali Civil War: War in Somalia

Ahmed Abdi Godane (Note: Somali: Axmed Cabdi Godane; Arabic: أحمد عبدي جودان) (10 July 1977 – 1 September 2014), also known as Mukhtar Abu Zubair, was a Somali militant leader who served as the second emir of al-Shabaab, an Islamist militant group based in Somalia. Godane, who received training and fought in Afghanistan, was designated by the United States as a terrorist. The exact date of Godane's rise to al-Shabaab's Emir is debated, although it seems he ascended to this position in December 2007.

During his leadership of Al-Shabaab, the group pledged allegiance to Al-Qaeda. He was killed in a U.S. drone strike on 1 September 2014 in southern Somalia.

== Early life ==
Ahmed Abdi Godane was born in Hargeisa, Somaliland on 10 July 1977. He hailed from the Arap subclan of the greater Isaaq clan. According to some reports he apparently had a difficult childhood and was said to have spent time at an orphanage. His initial education was at the Umar bin al-Khattab Islamic school in Hargeisa where he reportedly excelled academically. He won scholarships to pursue studies in Sudan and Pakistan, subsequently enrolling in a madrassa in Pakistan with financial support from affluent Saudis. It was during his travels abroad that he is believed to have been attracted to militant Islamism. Godane is believed to have journeyed to Afghanistan in 1998, where he received military training and battlefield experience alongside the Taliban and Al-Qaeda. During this time, he formed a friendship with Ibrahim Haji Jama Mee'aad, also known as Ibrahim al-Afghani. In 2001, he subsequently returned to Somaliland.

While in Somaliland, Godane landed a high-profile job as a salesman in al-Barakat, a Somali remittance company. Godane also began taking part in religious debates about Salafism and started to express criticism towards the Somaliland administration, deeming it "un-Islamic." He then attempted to establish his own jihadist organization in Somaliland, but the environment proved to be extremely unfriendly and resistant to his efforts.

In 2002, Godane and al-Afghani moved to Ethiopia's Ogaden region with the intention of establishing a new jihadist group. During their time there, Godane and his fighters staged an ambush on a convoy of drug traffickers returning from Somaliland to Ethiopia, resulting in the deaths of the traffickers and the seizure of approximately $1 million in the heist. Ethiopian authorities apprehended most of the assailants, but Godane and al-Afghani managed to evade capture and within a couple months fled to southern Somalia, where the absence of a functional government was conducive to their activities.

== Islamic Courts Union ==
Using the money acquired from their heist, Godane and al-Afghani managed to infiltrate the Islamic courts in order to recruit people to their cause of Salafi jihadism. By 2005, Godane began forging close relationships with other leaders within the Islamic Courts Union (ICU) and established a strong alliance with the leader of al-Shabaab, Aden Hashi Farah Aero. He was allegedly involved with the murders of several aid workers in Somaliland including a British couple Dick and Enid Eyeington, he was then sentenced in absentia to 25 years in prison for terrorism related charges. During this period, Godane assumed command of a significant number of al-Shabaab fighters and played a pivotal role in the ICU's successful campaign to defeat local warlords and capture Mogadishu. In mid-2006, he took on the role of secretary-general of the Executive Council of the ICU.

On 24 September 2006, the ICU captured the important port city from Barre Adan Shire Hiiraale leader of the Juba Valley Alliance, a tribal dispute has taken place between Habar Gidir leaders of the al-Shabaab faction within ICU and the Ogaden clan Ras Kamboni Brigades led by Hassan Abdullah Hersi al-Turki over the position of the military police leader. A compromise was reached where both groups agreed on appointing Ahmed Godane, an outsider who hails from the northern Isaaq clan as the head of military forces in the strategic city of Kismayo, Lower Juba.

== Al-Shabaab ==
=== Rise to Power ===
After the Ethiopian invasion toppled the ICU from power in 2006, Godane was one of the al-Shabaab leaders instrumental in reorganizing the group and laying the groundwork for the launch of its insurgency against the Ethiopian occupation. He was also at the forefront of delegitimizing Sharif Sheikh Ahmed after the latter was elected as the new president of the Somali Transitional Federal Government (TFG). Godane, during his time as Emir, oversaw the rapid expansion of both al-Shabaab's territorial control in southern and central Somalia as well as the organization of governing structures to exercise a degree of control over these newly acquired areas. Regional governors were appointed to oversee the implementation of the group's policies, programs, and edicts at the provincial (wilayat) level, with local administrators exercising authority at lower levels.

Following the withdrawal of Ethiopian troops in 2009, al-Shabaab was able to achieve relative stability in the areas under its control by implementing a strict interpretation of Sharia law, focusing on carrying out punishments for specific offenses such as murder, theft, robbery, adultery, fornication, and espionage. This stringent legal code had economic implications, leading to increased commerce and trade in areas under al-Shabab's influence, including major cities like Baidoa and Kismayo. Local insurgent authorities also initiated public works projects, including bridge and road construction, irrigation canal development, and famine relief distribution in 2011. Additionally, al-Shabab established a proficient and multi-lingual media network.

Godane rejected Somali nationalist goals as he believed that the group's effort in Somalia was a part of the global jihad led by al-Qaeda. In his first statement on June 2, 2008, as the head of al Shabaab, Godane pledged allegiance to Osama bin Laden and vowed that his group would launch a direct attack against the United States. Godane continued to reject negotiations with what he called the "apostate government," arguing that the Somali Transitional Federal Government must either surrender or face destruction. "We tell the Mujahideen to not trust [negotiations], and they should know that it is the path which led those whom they are fighting today to apostasy," he said in an audio message released on jihadist forums on July 6, 2009.

In January 2010, Godane, speaking on behalf of Al-Shabaab, released a statement reiterating his support for al-Qaeda and stated that they had "agreed to join the international jihad of al Qaeda". For his allegiance to Al-Qaeda, the U.S. government announced a $7 million bounty for information leading to Godane's capture. In July 2010, Godane claimed responsibility for deadly twin bombings in Kampala, Uganda on behalf of al Shabaab. "Allah willing, we will take revenge for all who were martyred by AMISOM guns. What happened in Kampala is just the beginning and a prelude," he said.

=== Tensions within Al-Shabaab ===
Godane and his close friend Ibrahim Haji Jama Mee'aad (aka Ibrahim Al-Afghani) both rose to prominence within Al-Shabaab at the same time but, despite their close relationship, the two men had widely divergent views on what the future of Al-Shabaab should be. This resulted in tensions within the organization and the alienation of many of Godane's oldest friends as it became apparent that Godane's agenda was transnational.

Godane faced internal criticism due to the failed "Ramadan Offensive" in August 2010, characterized by poorly planned mass infantry attacks in Mogadishu on SNA and AMISOM positions, causing significant insurgent casualties. Dissatisfaction within al-Shabab centered on control of the consultative council, with Godane stacking it with loyalists and sidelining critics like Robow and Hassan Dahir Aweys. Internal discord further exacerbated following the entry of Ethiopian military forces in south-western Somalia and when Kenyan forces invaded southern Somalia during Operation Linda Nchi in October and November 2011 respectively. Over time, as battlefield losses increased and al-Shabab suffered more defeats, old issues of contingency resurfaced, as did the discussion of the treatment of Muslims and disregard for Muslim casualties.

In mid-March 2012, a prominent American member of al-Shabab, Omar Hammami, initiated a significant internal crisis. He posted a video on his YouTube account, declaring his departure from the group due to disagreements over "Sharia and strategy," citing concerns for his safety. Hammami, along with other dissatisfied foreign fighters like Khattab al-Masri, engaged in public disputes with al-Shabab and its supporters both on and offline. This conflict divided the jihadist online community, creating a public relations nightmare for Godane and his supporters. Amid growing criticism from Hammami and dissident foreign fighters, Godane faced a significant internal challenge from notable dissident al-Shabab leaders, including founding members Mukhtar Robow and Hassan Dahir Aweys. By April 2013, even long-time Godane supporter, Ibrahim al-Afghani, denounced the group's leader in a letter to Al-Qaeda emir Ayman al-Zawahiri accusing Godane of using violence to suppress dissent and mistreating foreign fighters. Godane responded to these accusations with force. He reportedly ordered the killing of Hammami and other foreign jihadists on April 25. Afghani, Robow and Aweys issued a fatwa telling Godane supporters to cease hunting Hammami. In late June 2013, fighting erupted between forces loyal to Godane and those loyal to Afghani, Robow and Aweys in Barawe. Afghani was killed, while Robow and Aweys fled the city and subsequently defected to the government. In September 2013 Godane-controlled Amniyat, al-Shabab's intelligence branch, eventually located and killed Hammami and another dissident fighter, Usama al-Britani. Before his death, Hammami accused Godane of killing innocent Muslims and labeled him as an "apostate".

=== Consolidation ===
Godane and his loyalists were now firmly in control of al-Shabaab. His ascent to the peak of power was achieved through a gradual yet persistent consolidation of control within the group, strategic maneuvering to outshine rivals, and significant backing from key segments of al-Shabaab, notably the Amniyat network. A few months later, he achieved a significant media victory when al-Shabaab militants seized control of Nairobi's upscale Westgate Mall, confounding Kenyan security forces for several days. Godane claimed credit for the 2013 Westgate shopping mall attack in Nairobi, Kenya. He warned Kenya to prepare "for long-lasting war, blood, destruction and evacuation," stating that the attack was in retaliation for Kenya's 2011 invasion of Somalia. As Godane expanded al Shabaab's battlefield the group continued carrying out large-scale attacks within Mogadishu. This event highlighted the group's resilience and its capacity to continue major attacks in Mogadishu, indicating that the Godane-led al-Shabaab would remain a significant player in the country despite territorial losses and other setbacks experienced since the spring of 2011.

In May 2014, Godane delivered a speech lecturing on the suffering of Muslims in Kenya and throughout the world, "We advise the Muslims in different parts of the world who are suffering under the heel of the global Crusader war against Islam to pick up arms in order to defend their religion, honor and properties."

== Death ==
On 1 September 2014, a U.S. drone strike carried out as part of the broader mission killed Al-Shabaab leader Godane. U.S. authorities hailed the raid as a major symbolic and operational loss for Al-Shabaab, and the Somali government offered a 45-day amnesty to all moderate members of the militant group. Political analysts also suggested that the insurgent commander's death will likely lead to Al-Shabaab's fragmentation and eventual dissolution.

On 2 September 2014, al-Shabaab confirmed that Godane was travelling in one of two vehicles hit by a U.S. AGM-114 Hellfire missile strike the previous day. It was not immediately confirmed if Godane himself was among the six militants killed. The vehicles were heading toward the coastal town of Barawe, al-Shabaab's main base. On 5 September 2014, the Pentagon confirmed during the 2014 NATO summit in Wales that Godane had been killed in the attack. On 6 September 2014, al-Shabaab officially confirmed Godane's death and announced Ahmad Umar Abu Ubaidah as his successor.

On the 26th June 2017, Al-Shabaab published a documentary on Godane, titled 'The March of Steadfastness of Sheikh Mukhtar Abu Al-Zubair' (Arabic: مسيرة الصمود الشيخ مختار أبو الزبير). The documentary includes interviews with prominent members of Al -Shabaab, such as Mahad Karate and Ali Mohamed Rage, well known as 'Ali Dheere'. The film also includes the only known video of Godane.
