= Zakaria Mohamed Haji-Abdi =

Somali politician

His Excellency Zakariye Mohamud Haji Abdi

Minister of Information, Higher Education and Culture
- In office 2002–2003

Acting Minister of Foreign Affairs
- In office 2002–2003

Personal details
- Born: 1958 (age 67–68) Galkacyo, Somalia
- Other political affiliations: Xisbiga Garsoor
- Profession: Politician
- Known for: Former Minister of Information, Higher Education and Culture

Zakaria Mohamud Haji Abdi (Somali: Sakariye Maxamuud Xaaji Cabdi) (born 1958) is the former Somali Minister for Information and Telecommunication, Higher Education & Culture, acting foreign minister and the leader of Alliance for the Re-liberation of Somalia. He helped organize the May 2000 Somali Peace Conference and later served on the technical committee for the Djibouti Peace process.

== Early life ==
Zakaria was born in Galkacyo, Somalia, in 1958, and he comes from the Leelkase Tanade, a sub-clan of the Darod clan.

== Education ==
From an early age he attended Dugsi where he would memorize the Qur'an and learn the basic Islamic Principles. He attended an Egyptian elementary school in Galkacyo. The family moved to Mogadishu in 1969, where he attended intermediate and secondary school. He graduated from Riyadh University, Faculty of Agriculture, where he obtained a BSc in agricultural engineering. He has an MBA from State University of New York at Albany, MSc from Middlesex University in Londo, and he has a Doctorate in Food Security and Environmental Management from AIU University in Hawaii State, USA.

== Career ==
=== Somali Minister ===
Zakaria served as a Minister of Information, Minister of Education and acting foreign minister for two consecutive IGAD summit meetings in Khartoum, Sudan, and Kampala, Uganda (2002–2003). Member of Somali parliament from 2004 to 2007. Also member of Arab Parliament from 2005 to 2007 as member of Foreign Relations and Strategic Security of the Arab World.

=== Leadership profiles ===
Zakaria is a former minister in several portfolios, a member of the Somali and Arab Parliaments, a former leader, and one of the founders of the [Alliance for the Re-liberation of Somalia]. He was one of the presidential candidates of Somalia in the 2012 presidential election. He is currently the leader of the Garsoor (Justice) Party, one of the largest Somali Political Parties, a senior expert consultant at the Ministry of Agriculture of the Federal Republic of Somalia in the Food Security and Environmental management sectors, and chairman of Hufan Group of Companies in Mogadishu, Somalia.

Dr Zakaria successfully released the MV Sirius Star, a Saudi Arabian oil tanker, which was hijacked by Somali pirates in November 2008 through negotiations, when the Saudi government asked him to assist them in this endeavor. This event garnered significant international attention due to the tanker's size. He saved the Ship's crew and an ensuing environmental disaster that could cause huge damage to that part of the world.

== Personal life ==
Mr Zakaria is a father and has children.
