= Battle of Kismayo (2009) =

- Part of the Somali Civil War and the Somali Civil War (2009–present)
Date	1–7 October 2009
Location	Kismayo, Lower Jubba, Somalia
Result	al-Shabaab victory
Territorial changes	al-Shabaab takes complete control of Kismayo.

Belligerents
al-Shabaab	Hizbul Islam: Raskamboni Brigade

Commanders and leaders
Ibrahim Haji Jama Mee'aad "al-Afghani"	Ahmed Mohamed Islaan "Madoobe"

The Battle of Kismayo (2009) erupted on 1 October 2009, after the Islamist alliance occupying Kismayo, Somalia broke down. Sheikh Ahmed "Madobe" and his Raskamboni Brigade forces attempted to expel al-Shabaab from the city, but were overpowered, resulting in an al-Shabaab takeover of Kismayo.
