= Yusuf Indhacade =

Somali Warlord

Yusuf Mohammed Siad Indhacade

Minister of Defense of Somalia
- In office 2009 – 9 June 2010
- Preceded by: Mohamed Abdi Mohamed
- Succeeded by: Abdihakim Mohamoud Haji-Faqi

Personal details
- Born: Lower-Shabelle, Somalia
- Party: Transitional Federal Government
- Nickname: Inda'ade (White Eyes)

Yusuf Mohammed Siad Indhacade, (Somali: Yuusuf Maxamed Siyaad "Indhacadde") aka "Inda'ade" (White Eyes) is a Somali former Minister. In 2011 he was a General in the Somali National Army. He hails from the Ayr sub-clan, part of the Habar Gidir, which is a branch of the Hawiye clan. For a short period he was Somali Minister of Defence (Somalia).

Nicknamed "white-eyed" (or Indhacadde), he was a former governor of Lower Shabelle in 2002. He later allied himself with the Islamic Courts. The Islamic Courts advanced to central and south Somalia regions, including the Kismayo area, before Inda'ade pledged his support, giving them control of Lower Shabelle region in September 2006. In December 2006, he appealed to Somalia's youth to join his movement's Holy War against Ethiopia. He had been friends with Barre Aden Shirre Hiiraale, who was leader of the Juba Valley Alliance which controlled Kismayo, and later became Defense Minister for the Transitional Federal Government, but the two parted ways over which side to support in the Somali Civil War. Recently he became part of the Islamist resistance group, formed in January 2008 known as Hizbul Islam. He however soon started an internal conflict in the group as he claimed to have removed the group's chairman Sheikh Omar Iman Abubakar and replaced him with another Islamic cleric. Hassan Dahir Aweys however expressed support for Omar Iman and criticized Inda'ade saying he "has made it normal to destroy every group he is part of." On May 17, 2009, he defected to the Transitional Federal Government and was later appointed Minister of Defense. He resigned from the position as minister on 17 June 2010 and started his own faction after claiming the government didn't keep to its agreements.

== War in Somalia ==
On December 12, 2006, he issued the ultimatum that Ethiopian forces should withdraw within seven days. On December 15, 2006, referring to the proposed IGASOM peacekeeping force, he warned African nations to not send forces to Somalia. On December 19, the deadline for Ethiopia came and went. Analysts considered Inda'ade's hardline stance had caused a split with moderates within the ICU. On December 20, after the Ethiopians refused to withdraw, he admitted fighting had begun between the two sides, marking the beginning of the war at the Battle of Baidoa.

On December 21, 2006, as the fighting intensified with Ethiopia, he took a flight to an undisclosed location with Hassan Dahir Aweys, and was said to be on the hajj, the pilgrimage in Mecca.

On December 23, 2006, as the battle continued, he made a worldwide appeal for jihadists to come to Somalia, and claimed the ICU had taken Tiyeglow, Bakool Region (gobol). However, in the days that followed, the army of the ICU collapsed, leading to the Fall of Mogadishu and the retreat of the ICU to their stronghold at Ras Kamboni.

== Car Bomb Attack ==
On February 15, 2010, "Indha Adde", then serving as State Minister for Defense, narrowly escaped at least one suicide car bomb attack against his convoy in Mogadishu. Reports still vary, but as many as eight civilians and two TFG troops may have been killed. Addressing the press immediately following the attack, the Minister of State said that al-Shabaab would not deter him from his mission to "restore law and order." He told journalists two car bombs were used against him on February 15. A minibus coincidentally obstructed the first car bomb as the bomber sped toward the minister's convoy. The minister told the press that he saw a second oncoming car and in the confusion following the first explosion, ran into a nearby hotel. Inde Adde said that moments later, this second car also exploded. The explosions caused extensive property damage.

Following the attack on Afric Hotel by Al Shabaab on 31 January 2021, Indha Adde suggested that General Galal was killed not by Al Shabaab, but by Somali security forces.

== See also ==
- Islamic Courts Union
- Rise of the Islamic Courts Union (2006)
- War in Somalia (2006–2009)
