= Ras Kamboni Brigades =

Islamist insurgent group in Somalia

- Leader: Hassan Abdullah Hersi al-Turki
- Dates active: 2006-2010
- Merged into: Islamic Courts Union
- Group: Mohamed Zubeir Ogaden sub-clan
- Headquarters: Ras Kamboni
- Active regions: Southern Somalia, Jubbaland
- Ideology: Islamism
- Size: 500-1,000
- Wars: Somali Civil War

The Ras Kamboni Brigades also known as the Ras Kamboni Brigade, Muaskar Ras Kamboni or Mu'askar Ras Kamboni was an Islamist insurgent group active in Somalia (mostly in the Jubbalands), which took part in the anti-Ethiopian insurgency and later in the insurgency against the new Transitional Federal Government of Sheikh Sharif Ahmed. It was founded by Hassan Abdullah Hersi al-Turki, who was a commander of the Islamic Courts Union (ICU) and the commander of its predecessor Itihaad al Islamiyah.

Initially based in camps near the southern town of Ras Kamboni, the group preceded the formation of the ICU. In early 2006, it began fighting alongside the ICU against U.S.-backed Mogadishu warlords. A significant portion of the Brigades’ fighters and equipment were integrated into the ICU (while the rest maintained the security of the camps in the far south) under the command Hassan Abdullah Hersi al-Turki and played a key role in the defeat of warlord Bashir Raghe.

In January 2009, after the Ethiopian withdrawal they merged with the Asmara-based wing of the Alliance for the Re-liberation of Somalia, led by Sheikh Hassan Dahir Aweys, Jabhatul Islamiya ("Islamic Front"), led by Sheikh Mohamed Ibrahim Hayle and Muaskar Anole ("Anole School") to form Hizbul Islam and continue the war against the TFG. During the 2009 Battle of Mogadishu, where in Hizbul Islam took part, Hassan Turki led a group of fighters from the Ras Kamboni Brigade from Kisimayo to Mogadishu as reinforcements, to join the battle.

In February 2010, the group left Hizbul Islam and joined Harakat al-Shabaab Mujahedeen. After Sheikh Hassan al-Turkey joined al-Shabaab, defecting commander Sheikh Ahmed Mohamed Islam "Madobe" left the organisation to form his own anti-al-Shabaab militia, the Raskamboni movement.
