= Battle of Kismayo (2008) =

- Part of the War in Somalia
Date	August 20–22, 2008
Location	Kismayo, Somalia
Result	Al-Shabaab victory

Belligerents
Fighters loyal to Al-Shabaab and the Islamic Courts Union	(Somalia) Marehan pro-government militias

Commanders and leaders
Ahmed Madoobe Hassan Turki	(Somalia) Barre Adan Shire Hiiraale

Casualties and losses
- At least 89 killed

The Battle of Kismayo began on August 20, 2008, when Islamist fighters took the battle to the militias loyal to warlord Barre Hiiraale in Kismayo. Fighters began an offensive to conquer the Southern Somali port of Kismayo from the pro-government militias. Three days of fighting reportedly killed 89 people and injured 207 more. The Islamists led by Ahmed Madoobe and Hassan Turki have successfully captured the city after intense fighting. On August 22, the pro government militias led by Barre Hiiraale have eventually left the city .

== Background ==
Al-Shabab, fighting as part of the Islamic Courts Union, was driven out of Kismayo in January 2007 after Ethiopian forces rolled into Somalia to back the interim government in the fight to take control of much of central and southern Somalia. According to Interim Somali President Abdullahi Yusuf, Kismayo was subsequently not under the Ethiopian-backed transitional government's control, and there were no Ethiopian forces in the area at the time of the battle; clan militias in Kismayo claimed to be part of the government, however. In the months prior to the battle, Kismayo was considered peaceful in comparison to Mogadishu, the capital.

== Fighting ==
Pro government militias, led by warlord-turned-parliamentarian Barre Hiiraale, suffered heavy losses, and Hirale's personal car was reportedly seized by Islamist fighters. According to witnesses, August 22 saw the most intense fighting, with both sides using a lot of heavy guns including anti-aircraft guns.

== Aftermath ==
The fighting in Kismayo is reported to have displaced an estimated 35,000 people. After the withdrawal of Hiiraale's fighters, Al-Shabaab commenced a peaceful disarmament process targeting local armed groups that had been contributing to insecurity in Kismayo. In early September a night-time curfew was imposed.

A new district administration was established on 6 September 2008. Its members reportedly represented the ICU and Al-Shabaab (three members each) plus a local clan (one member) which had played a part in the military assault. The legitimacy of the administration was later disputed, however, as the ICU and elders from local clans alleged that Al-Shabaab had not consulted them adequately.

On 28 September 2012, Kenya Army troops and Raskamboni movement militia re-captured the city from the Al-Shabaab insurgents during the Battle of Kismayo (2012). This was a culmination to the Kenyan Operation Linda Nchi attack into Somalia which had begun late the year before.
