= Muaskar Anole =

Mu'askar Anole
- Leaders: Mukhtar Abu Ali Aisha; Mohamed Mire
- Dates active: 2007–2009
- Group: Marehan (Darod) Harti (Darod)
- Headquarters: Laagta Anoole
- Active regions: Southern Somalia
- Wars: Somali Civil War

Muaskar Anole (Arabic: مسكر أنول, lit. 'Anole Training Camp') also known as Mu'askar Anole, Mucaskarka Caanoole, Mucaskarka al-Furqan, al-Furqan Camp or al-Furqan Forces was an Islamist militia in Somalia. The group participated in the 2006–2009 insurgency against Ethiopia and in January 2009 merged with the Asmara based wing of the Alliance for the Re-liberation of Somalia, led by Sheikh Hassan Dahir Aweys, the Ras Kamboni Brigade, led by Sheikh Hassan Abdullah Hersi al-Turki and Jabhatul Islamiya to form Hizbul Islam which became the second most powerful insurgent group (after al-Shabaab) in Somalia which continued fighting the TFG and AMISOM peacekeepers, after Ethiopian withdrawal. Little is known about the group.

On 21 April 2009, Anole and the Ras Kamboni brigades fought each other in a village called Abdalla Birole, which lies 40 km west of Kismayo. This happened after Anole fighters invaded a village called Bulo Haji, while Ras Kamboni Brigade fighters arrived in Abdalla Birole and they clashed. The situation in the two villages was said to be tense, 4 people were killed and 7 injured during the fighting.
