= Bashir Raghe Shiiraar =

Somali rebel leader and businessman (born 1965)

Bashir Rage Shiiraar
- Born: 1965 (age 60–61)
- Occupation: Businessman

Bashir Rage Shiiraar (born 1965) was a Somali secular rebel leader and businessman from the Warsangali clan (an Abgaal subclan).

He became a member of the US-backed Alliance for the Restoration of Peace and Counter-Terrorism.

He was the head of the export department of the El-Ma An port which served as Mogadishu's port following the closure of the city's main harbour in 1995. He died in 2021 of a heart attack.
