= Ibrahim Haji Jama Mee'aad =

Somalian Islamic militant (died 2013)

Ibrahim al-Afghani
- ابراهيم الافغاني

Personal details
- Born: c. 1960 Hargeisa, Somalia
- Died: 20 June 2013 (aged 52–53) Barawa, Somalia
- Education: University of the District of Columbia

Military service
- Allegiance: Islamic Courts Union; Al-Qaeda: Al-Shabaab

Ibrahim al-Afghani (c. 1960– 20 June 2013), also known as Ibrahim Haji Jama Mee'aad and Abu Bakr As Zayla’i, was a prominent member of Somalia's Al-Shabaab, an insurgent group fighting Somalia's Transitional Federal Government. He hailed from Habr Awal, a sub-clan of the Isaaq clan.

== Early life ==
Afghani was born circa 1960 in Hargeisa, one of seven children in a religious family. He attended Farah Omaar High School, where his classmates recall him being devoutly religious and knowledgeable of Islam. During his years in high school, he was part of a small group called "Al-Wahdat al-Shabaab al-Islam" led by Sheikh Ali Warsame, which advocated for Salafism and a pure interpretation of Islamic law. Afghani left Somalia in 1981 to study in the United States, where he was a student at the University of the District of Columbia. He spent much of his time at the Islamic Center of Washington.

== Somali Civil War ==
According to a biography published by dissidents within al-Shabaab, in 1987 or 1988, Afghani met Abdullah Azzam, a well known Palestinian cleric who was raising money from across the world to finance the Mujahideen in the Soviet-Afghan War. In late 1988, following the expiration of his student visa in the United States, Afghani traveled to Egypt, then Pakistan and then made his way to the city of Peshawar, near the Durand Line. Shortly after Azzam's death in November 1989, Afghani returned to Somalia. Following the toppling of the Somali government in 1991, Afghani and a few other Islamists founded a militant training camp in the port city of Kismayo, which they called "Camp Khalid ibn Walid". Within three months, over a thousand men, many of them affiliated with Al-Itihad Al-Islamiya (AIAI) had been enlisted in the camp, prompting Afghani and other jihadists to open more camps across southern Somalia. He officially became a fighter for AIAI in 1991 and fought with them in the frontlines against Ethiopian troops in the 1990s. By 1996, AIAI had effectively disintegrated into various splinter groups, following a leadership disagreement on whether the group should participate in violent and militant action.

In 1998, Afghani met Ahmed Godane, who was studying and training in Afghanistan at the time.

In 2002, Godane and al-Afghani travelled to the Somali Region of Ethiopia to start a new jihadist group. During their time there, Afghani, Godane and their fighters staged an ambush on a convoy of khat traffickers returning from Somaliland to Ethiopia, resulting in the deaths of the traffickers and the seizure of approximately $1 million in the heist. Ethiopian authorities apprehended most of the assailants, but Godane and al-Afghani managed to evade capture and within a couple months were able to flee to southern Somalia, which had no functioning government at the time. By late 2002, using the wealth from the heist, Godane and Afghani began to be active in the Islamic Courts Union in Mogadishu. In 2005, a new training camp named 'Salahuddin Muaskar' had been established, with Godane as its leader and Afghani being a senior leader and trainer.

== Al-Shabaab ==
Afghani formerly held positions as the first deputy leader of Al-Shabaab and was the head of economy and finance, and the Provisional Emir of Lower Juba and the administration in Kismayo, leading a seven-seat administration composed of Al-Shabaab, remnants of the various Islamist militias in Juba, and clan elders. He was rumoured to have been killed in a Predator drone attack on an al-Shabaab training camp south of Kismayo, Somalia on 25 June 2011, but he survived and was reported to have resigned from Al-Shabaab in December 2011.

== Death ==
For several months, internal conflict had been exasperated within Al-Shabaab due to criticisms of the then leader, Ahmed Godane, and his actions and decisions regarding the merger with Al-Qaeda and the treatment of foreign fighters, especially in the case of Omar Hamammi, who was at the time being hunted by Al-Shabaab for defecting from the group. In April 2013, an open letter was circulated on extremist websites reportedly penned by Afghani to Al-Qaeda leader Ayman al-Zawahiri, criticising Godane's leadership. these internal rifts led to internecine violence as Godane effected what was virtually a purge of his critics. Details on Afghani's death remain disputed. On the evening of June 19, 2013, Al-Shabaab's security wing, called the Amniyat, surrounded Afghani's residence in Barawe, erecting roadblocks and deploying numerous fighters around many key buildings in the city. According to witnesses, following Maghreb prayers, Afghani was walking without a bodyguards to a nearby mosque. A group of young men approached him as he was walking, with one of them shaking Afghani's hand. Moments later, a second man came from behind and shot Afghani once in the head. He was critically injured when moments later, men jumped out of a parked car and began to shoot at his body, one of the men shouted “Munafiq”, the Arabic term for “hypocrite”. His body was taken into the car and driven away to an unknown location. On 29 June 2013, Al-Shabaab military spokesperson, Abu Musab, announced that they had killed Afghani during a gun battle on 20 June 2013 when he resisted arrest, but family members, including Afghani's sister, said that he had been executed by the militants.
