= Jabhatul Islamiya =

Islamist insurgent group in Somalia in 2007–2009

- Leaders: Ahmed Abdillahi Omar; Abdulqaadir "Komando"; Mohamed Hayle
- Dates active: December 2007 – February 2009
- Active regions: Southern Somalia
- Ideology: Islamism
- Size: Several hundred
- Wars: Somali Civil War
- Website: jabiso.net

Jabhatul Islamiya (JABISO) also known as the Somali Islamic Front (SIF) was an Islamist insurgent group in Somalia. The group participated in the insurgency following the Ethiopian invasion of Somalia in 2006 that toppled the Islamic Courts Union government. The organization aimed to resist the Ethiopian military occupation and form an Islamic government in Somalia.

Jabhatul Islamiya first went public in December 2007, and was alleged to be the armed wing of Jama'at al-I'tisam, an offshoot of Al-Itihaad Al-Islamiya. The chairman of the organization was Ahmed Abdillahi Omar, while the chief military commander was Abdulqaadir "Kommandos", a former Somali National Army officer, businessman and Islamist activist. In a public statement issued in 2008, Jabhatal Islamiya declared that it had been formed in response to the full-scale Ethiopian/American invasion that had toppled the ICU and called on all resistance organizations to unite.

The group reportedly had several hundred fighters under its command. Chairman Ahmed Abdillahi Omar declared that the movement collaborated with all resistance forces opposing Ethiopian forces; but ideological differences between JABISO and Al-Shabaab reportedly prevented meaningful cooperation between the two. JABISO was closely linked to United Western Somalia Liberation Front (UWSLF) which operated in the Somali Region of Ethiopia (Ogaden). During the last days of the Ethiopian military occupation in January 2009, Jabhatul Islamiya was still engaging in battles with the TFG.

In February 2009 the group merged with the Asmara-based wing of the Alliance for the Re-liberation of Somalia, led by Sheikh Hassan Dahir Aweys, the Ras Kamboni Brigade, led by Sheikh Hassan Abdullah Hersi al-Turki and a smaller group Mu'askar Anole to form Hizbul Islam which became the second most powerful insurgent group (after al-Shabaab) in Somalia, which continued fighting the TFG and AMISOM peacekeepers after Ethiopian withdrawal.
