= Hizbul Islam =

2009–2010 and 2012–2014 Somali Islamist insurgent group

- Flag of Hizbul Islam
- Leaders: Omar Iman (7 February 7 – 26 May 2009); Hassan Dahir Aweys (26 May 2009 – 20 December 2010)
- Dates active: January 2009–December 2010 September 2012–June 2014
- Merger of: (al-Qaeda) Jabhatul Islamiya; (al-Qaeda) ARS; (al-Qaeda) Mu'askar Ras Kamboni; (al-Qaeda) Muaskar Anole
- Headquarters: Kismayo (January 2009–October 2009); Afgooye (October 2009–December 2010)
- Active regions: Southern and Central Somalia
- Ideology: Islamism
- Wars: Somali Civil War

Hizbul Islam ("Party of Islam") was a Somali Islamist group formed after four Islamist groups merged to oppose the new Transitional Federal Government administration of President Sheikh Sharif Ahmed several weeks after end of the Ethiopian military occupation of Somalia.

The four groups were: Hassan Aweys' the ARS-A, Jabhatul Islamiya ("Islamic Front"), Hassan Abdullah Hersi al-Turki's the Mu'askar Ras Kamboni (Ras Kamboni Brigade) and Muaskar Anole, the Marehan clan's Militia and Harti clan's militia. Hizbul Islam's principle objectives was the withdrawal of foreign troops and the imposition of Sharia in Somalia. The organization was badly weakened by fighting in Mogadishu in early 2009, when it had nearly toppled the government. By 2010 the group split between members who were actively fighting against or actively supporting Al-Shabaab. After much of the group had been merged into Al-Shabaab, Hassan Aweys announced Hizbul Islam's separation from them in 2012.

== History ==
=== Start ===
Hizbul Islam was formed in January 2009 by a merger of four groups, with Ali Yassin Mohamed among its founders.

On 7 February 2009, Hizbul announced that it would continue to oppose the new government led by President Sharif Sheik Ahmed and the African Union forces in Mogadishu. Omar Iman, the group's first chairman, said, "the so-called government led by Sharif Sheikh Ahmed is not different from the one of Abdullahi Yusuf" and that they would continue the struggle.

Sheikh Omar Iman Abubakar, a high-ranking official of the Eritrea-based Alliance for the Reliberation of Somalia, was initially appointed as the group's chairman, he however, later resigned for Sheikh Hassan Dahir Aweys to take his position.

=== Internal struggle, 2009 ===
The groups first internal power struggle lasted from March to May 2009. Two months after it was formed, an apparent power struggle in Hizbul Islam emerged. At a press conference in Mogadishu, a group claiming to represent Hizbul Islam announced that Sheikh Mohamed Hassan Ahmed, another Islamic cleric, had replaced Omar Iman as chairman of the group.

The press conference, on 24 March, was attended by several important members of Hizbul Islam, most notably the notorious ex-warlord Indho Ade. Sheik Da'ud Mohamed Abtidon, who claimed to be the new spokesperson for the group accused Omar Iman of refusing to accept the Islamic scholars' calls for a ceasefire, in return for AMISOM's withdrawal. Indho Ade was quoted as saying "The group (Hizbul Islam) has agreed to remove Sheikh Omar Iman since he made a mistake and violated the group's laws." Sheikh Mohamed Hassan Ahmed declared a ceasefire and entered negotiations for implementation of sharia law and AMISOM's withdrawal in return for joining the government.

However, Sheikh Aweys, the group's most powerful figure, rejected the claims made by Indho Ade that Sheikh Omar Iman had been removed as chairman. He was quoted as saying "No one can take authority away from Sheikh Omar Iman, because the group (Hizbul Islam) appointed him as chairman." Sheikh Aweys said that Indho Ade and the others from the press conference should form their own group instead of doing what he described as "trying to destroy Hizbul Islam". Prior to this Sheikh Omar Iman had denied that Indho Ade was the group's defence secretary. This led to the division of Hizbul Islam, with one group led by Indho Ade and the other led by Sheikh Aweys (with Omar Iman as chairman).

On 21 April 2009, Anole and the Ras Kamboni Brigades fought each other in a village called Abdalla Birole, which lies 40 km west of Kismayo. This happened after Anole fighters invaded a village called Bulo Haji, while Ras Kamboni Brigade militia arrived in Abdalla Birole and they clashed. The situation in the two villages was said to be tense, 4 people were killed and 7 injured during the fighting.

On 4 May, Al Shabaab and members of the main faction of Hizbul Islam, led by Sheikh Aweys and Umar Iman, attacked a base used by Indho Ade's group of Hizbul Islam. Indho Ade's lieutenants claimed that Al Shabaab and Hizbul Islam trying to expand territory into areas under the control of Indho Ade's militia.

Eight days later, Indho Ade handed over his arms to Sheikh Aweys, ending the group's division. However, soon after, he defected to the government. On 26 May, Omar Iman Abubakr stepped down as chairman and handed over his position to Sheikh Aweys, who was by then clearly the most powerful figure in the group.

=== Defeat by Al-Shabaab 2009-2010 ===
On 1 October 2009, armed conflict between Hizbul Islam and Al-Shabaab began in a dispute between a faction of the Ras Kamboni Brigades and Al-Shabaab over who was in charge of Kisimayo. ARS-A and JABISO, which were aligned with Al-Shabaab in Mogadishu and the central Somalia Hiran region, refused to support the Ras Kamboni Brigades, meanwhile Anole remained neutral. It also led to a split within the Ras Kamboni Brigades, with a faction led by Sheikh "Madoobe" starting the war against Al-Shabaab and a faction led by Hassan "Turki" siding with Al Shabaab.

The Battle of Kismayo was won by Al-Shabaab which expelled Sheikh Madbobe's Ras Kamboni Brigade militia from the city. In the battles that followed, in November 2009, Sheikh Madobe's militia was overpowered by Al-Shabaab and local allies and forced to withdraw from the Lower Juba region and most of Southern Somalia. In February 2010, Hassan "Turki"'s branch declared a merge with Al-Shabaab. A clash in Hiran, in early 2010, was won by Al Shabaab, which then took control of the area.

In April 2010 a BBC correspondent compared Hizbul Islam to the Taliban of Afghanistan for banning radio stations from playing music.

Late in the year, Hizbul Islam were expelled from Bay region, after Al Shabaab seized control of Burhakaba. Soon after Hizbul Islam was forced to surrender the town of Luuq to Al Shabaab. From mid-December al-Shabaab fighters started taking over Hizbul Islam positions. On 20 December, Hizbul Islam surrendered to Al Shabaab. The BBC reported that rumours of a merger had not been confirmed by the leaders of the two groups, in particular Hizbul Islam leader Sheikh Aweys. Hizbul Islam was disbanded on 20 December 2010.

=== 2012 Regrouping ===
In late September 2012, after Al-Shabab had suffered a number of military setbacks as well as criticism as the presumed hand behind the shooting of parliamentarian Mustafa Haji Maalim, Hizbul Islam announced that it was going to pull its former members out of Al Shabaab and regroup. The move was due to long-standing ideological differences, such as the group's opposition to the use of foreign jihadis, according to its spokesperson, and was described as "a significant setback for Al-Shabab". The spokesperson said it still wanted the African Union mission to leave Somalia but welcomed the new president Hassan Sheikh Mohamud and parliament as a "positive development".

Hizbul Islam has renounced violence in 2013. In June 2014 former foreign affairs secretary for Hizbul Islam has announced that Hizbul Islam would continue its activity in Somali politics as a political party and changed its name to Istiqlal.

== Leadership ==
- Sheikh Mohamed Ibrahim Hayle - Leader of Jabhatul Islamiya (JABISO).
- Mukhtar Abu Ali Aisha - The Leader of Mu'askar Anole

Other leaders:

- Mohamed Moalim - Official spokesperson.

== Former leaders ==
- Sheikh Omar Iman Abubakar - Chairman of Hizbul Islam until 26 May 2009 when he stepped down, handing over his position to Sheikh Hassan Dahir Aweys.
- Sheikh Yusuf Mohammed Siad Inda'ade - A powerful warlord leading figure in the Asmara-based branch of the ARS until 17 May 2009, when he defected to the government.
- Sheikh Hassan Abdullah Hersi al-Turki - Leader of the Ras Kamboni Brigade which defected to Al-Shabaab.
- Sheikh Hassan Dahir Aweys - Leader of the Asmara-based wing of the ARS and chairman of the group. Later became Al-Shabaab's spiritual leader.

== See also ==
- Advance of the Islamic Courts Union
- Al-Itihaad al-Islamiya
- Al-Shabaab (Somalia)
- Islamic Courts Union
- Somalia War (2006–2009)
- Somali Civil War (2009–present)
