= Hassan Abdullah Hersi al-Turki =

Somali Islamist leader (1944–2015)

Hassan Abdullahi al-Turki
- حسن عبد الله حرسي التركي
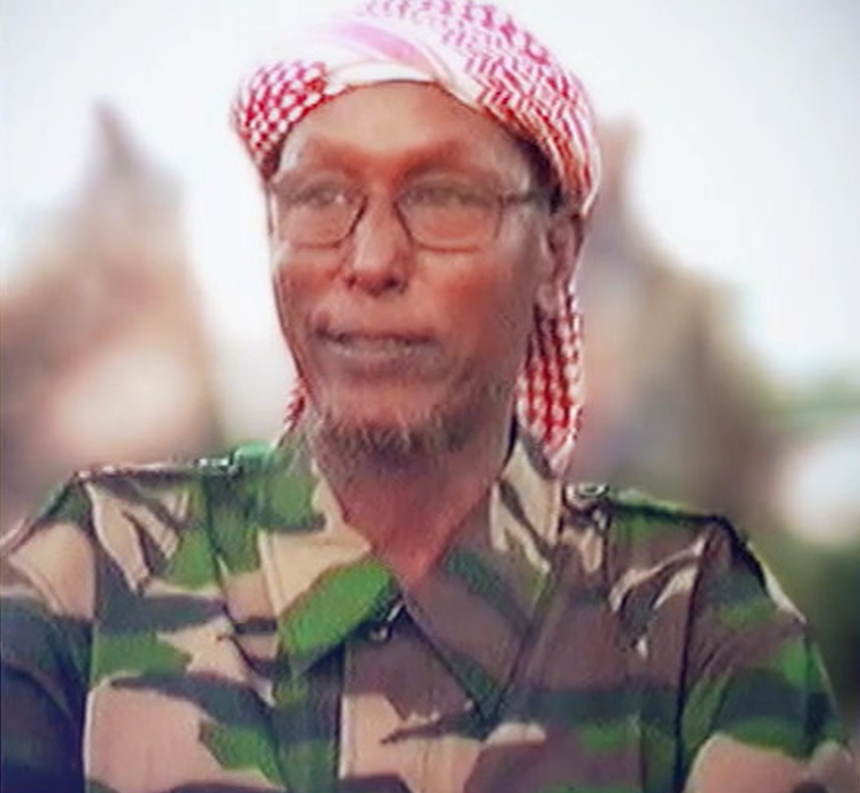

Personal details
- Born: c. 1944 Korahe, Ogaden, Ethiopia
- Died: May 27, 2015 (aged 70–71) Jilib, Middle Jubba, Somalia
- Resting place: Afmadow, Lower Jubba, Somalia

Military service
- Allegiance: Western Somali Liberation Front (1974 - 1981); Al-Itihaad Al-Islamiya (1983 - 1997); Ras Kamboni Brigades (2002 - 2006); Islamic Courts Union (2006 - 2008); Hizbul Islam (2009 - 2010); Al-Shabaab (2010 - 2015)
- Years of service: 1963–2015
- Battles/wars: Ogaden rebellion 1964 Ethiopian–Somali Border War; Ogaden War; Somali Civil War; Insurgency in Ogaden; Ethiopian invasion of Somalia

Sheikh Hassan Abdullah Hersi al-Turki (Somali: Hassan Abdullah Hirsii al-Turki, Arabic: حسن عبد الله حرسي التركي الجامعة; c. 1944 – 27 May 2015) was a Somali Islamist militant leader and former senior figure of al-Shabaab.

Born in Ogaden, an ethnic Somali region in eastern Ethiopia, he first took part in the 1963–1965 Ogaden revolt as a member of Nasrallah against the Ethiopian Empire and later joined the Western Somali Liberation Front (WSLF) in the 1970s. Al-Turki was the founder of the Ras Kamboni Brigades and a senior figure in several Islamist groups, including al-Itihaad al-Islamiya (AIAI), the Islamic Courts Union (ICU), Hizbul Islam, and Al-Shabaab.

He died of natural causes in 2015.

== Biography ==
Al-Turki was born in the Ogaden (today the Somali region) which was under the rule of the Ethiopian Empire. He hailed from the Reer Abdille subdivision of the Ogaden within the wider Darod clan. He was the brother-in-law of current Jubbaland governor Ahmed Madobe.

Al-Turki was a veteran of the 1963–1965 Ogaden revolt and 1964 Ethiopian–Somali War. He also fought in the 1970s insurgency and the 1977-78 Ogaden War over control of the Ogaden. He left the region after the war to continue his efforts in Somalia. Following his death, Al-Shabaab released a statement claiming that Al-Turki was behind the killing of the Catholic Bishop of Mogadishu Salvatore Colombo in July 1989 and had participated in the October 1993 Battle of Mogadishu against the US military and UNOSOM II. al-Turki founded the Ras Kamboni Brigades, an Islamist militia based near the town of Ras Kamboni in southern Somalia. The group operated primarily in what is now Jubbaland region and initially preceded the formation of the Islamic Courts Union (ICU).

In 2004, al-Turki was designated by the United States under Executive Order 13224 for alleged involvement in terrorist financing. In a subsequent interview with Al Jazeera, he rejected the designation and denied the accusations, stating:

I am not a terrorist. The terrorists are the Americans, Bush and his army who are exterminating the people of Afghanistan, Iraq, Somalia, Lebanon, and Palestine. The terrorists are the infidels led by Bush.

In early 2006, al-Turki's forces began cooperating with the ICU in fighting U.S.-backed warlords in Mogadishu. He supported the independence of the Ogaden region from Ethiopia and viewed the ICU as a vehicle for advancing that goal. Despite the significant distance between Ras Kamboni and Mogadishu, a significant portion of the brigade’s fighters and equipment was integrated into the ICU under al-Turki’s personal command, where they played a key role in the defeat of warlord Bashir Raghe. Al-Turki later stated that there was no distinction between his forces and those of the broader ICU military wing, as they had merged and operated as a unified bloc. As a military leader of ICU, he secured and governed towns in the far south such as Dhobley situated near the North Eastern Province. He also led ICU forces in the taking of Jubaland. He led ICU troops during the advance on Kismayo. Al-Turki addressed the people of Kismayo, saying that the region would be under Sharia law. "This city is seized by Islamic forces including all tribes of Somali men and foreigners, welcome to the new peace brought to this city and I promise you will live in security and prosperity", he reportedly said.

After the full-scale Ethiopian invasion of Somalia, he was targeted in a US airstrike on 3 March 2008. The two Tomahawk cruise missiles hit two homes in Dhobley that were allegedly visited by al-Turki, who was believed to have ties to al-Qaeda.

In February 2010, al-Turki officially merged the Ras Kamboni Brigades with Al-Shabaab and split from Hizbul Islam formally pledging allegiance to Al-Qaeda leader Osama bin Laden.

Al-Turki died of an undisclosed illness on 27 May 2015.
