= Alliance for the Re-liberation of Somalia =

Alliance for the Re–liberation of Somalia
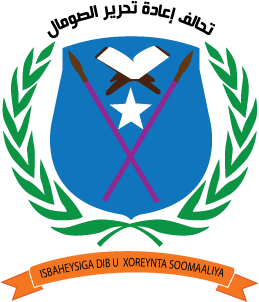
- Chairperson: Sheikh Sharif Ahmed (Djibouti wing / ARS–D); Hassan Dahir Aweys (Asmara wing / ARS–A)
- Founded: September 2007
- Preceded by: Islamic Courts Union
- Merged into: Transitional Federal Government of Somalia and Hizbul Islam
- Headquarters: Asmara (September 2007 – February 2009); Djibouti City (June 2008 – January 2009)
- Religion: Sunni Islam

The Alliance for the Re–liberation of Somalia (ARS) was a political party formed in Eritrea in September 2007 as an Islamist-led but broad-based coalition that served as the political successor to the Islamic Courts Union (ICU) during the Ethiopian military occupation of Somalia. It served as the principal political opposition to the Transitional Federal Government of Somalia (TFG) and participated in the 2007 and 2008 years of the insurgency.

During mid-2008 the alliance divided into two wings over the issue of peace negotiations with the TFG while Ethiopian troops were still occupying Somalia, one wing in Djibouti led by Sharif Sheikh Ahmed was willing to negotiate and the other in Asmara led by Hassan Dahir Aweys demanded Ethiopian troops withdraw first.

In June 2008, the Djibouti wing of the ARS and TFG signed a historic agreement that resulted integration of the ARS into the Somali transitional parliament by the end of the year. In January 2009, Sharif Ahmed, the former head of both the ICU and the ARS, was elected as the President of Somalia.

== History of the ARS ==
=== Formation ===
Members of the Islamic Courts Union, Transitional Federal Government officials opposed to the Ethiopian invasion, Somali diaspora and prominent figures of Somali civic society united to form a political party in Asmara, the capital of Eritrea. Roughly 400 delegates of the Somali Congress for Liberation and Reconstitution, which included members such as ICU Executive chairman Sharif Sheikh Ahmed, former TFG Speaker of Parliament Sharif Hassan Sheikh Aden, former Somali National Army General Jama Mohamed Ghalib, former TFG Deputy Prime Minister Hussein Mohamed Farrah, along with prominent members of women's groups approved a constitution and committee. The newly formed 191-member Central Committee was chaired by Sharif Hassan Sheikh Aden.

Notably, the alliance announced it would refuse to engage in talks with the Transitional Federal Government unless Ethiopian forces withdrew from Somalia. Days following its formation, the US ambassador to Kenya and the US envoy to Somalia both publicly dismissed the ARS as an unimportant organization.

==== Composition and aims ====
Foreigner observers present for the formation of the ARS believed it was unlikely that the alliance would be Islamist-led, as the insurgent opposition was hoping to draw on the broad political support and fundraising opportunities of the Somali diaspora. Despite these assertions head of the Islamic Courts Union Sharif Sheikh Ahmed was elected head of the alliance. Prof. Ibrahim Hassan Addou, former head of the ICU's foreign affairs department would be given the same position in the ARS. The alliance's Defence Secretary, Finance Secretary, Reconciliation Secretary and Justice Secretary positions were all staffed by ICU officials. Members of civil society and the TFG would staff other positions in the ARS. Al-Shabaab rejected an invitation to join the ARS conference and later condemned the alliance. The ARS outlined its main objectives as follows:

- Liberating Somalia from Ethiopia
- Promoting Somali solutions through dialogue and peaceful means
- Combating crimes and violence against civilians
- Facilitating the resettlement of displaced people
- Organizing general elections once peace and security are established
- Establishing a National Government

To the surprise of many observers, the ARS immediately took a militant stance on the Ethiopian presence in Somalia and declared war on Ethiopian military forces in the country. The alliance further decried the African Unions newly established peacekeeping operation, AMISOM, as an occupation force and demanded its withdrawal. The ARS would put out a communique on its position soon after stating that, “Resistance to the occupation is a legitimate and sacred right. It is a national duty as well as a religious obligation for all citizens,” A March 2008 statement would further explain the alliances opposition to Ethiopian, American and AMISOM military forces:

'...during the brief control of the Union of the Islamic Courts of Somalia, leaders managed to restore law and order in most parts of Somalia in a short period of time. For six months, the Somali people had enjoyed living in harmony, peace, calmness and renovation. The U.S. worked hand in hand with the Ethiopian invaders at every level of the Ethiopian military, while U.S. jets persistently caused terror from the air. Once the Ethiopians had placed themselves and their puppet Somali "government" in the capital, Mogadishu, the Americans sent their other African proxies, the Ugandan and Burundi military, to make up most of the weak African "peacekeeping" force in Somalia. The Somali resistance to the Ethiopian invasion consider the African peacekeepers in Mogadishu to be agents of the U.S. and, concerning the Ugandans and Burundians they are right to attack. If there were ever a formula for bloody and protracted war in Somalia, it is Ethiopian occupation, which is already unifying diverse elements of the Somali population in fighting.'

On 30 September 2007 the ARS claimed responsibility for committing an attack for the first time. Ethiopian National Defence Force (ENDF) troops in Mogadishu were reportedly attacked in two locations in the city. During a November 2007 visit to the United States by ARS leader Zakaria Mohamed Haji-Abdi, he publicly called in on Somali Americans to enlist in the resistance against the Ethiopians during a rally at the Minneapolis Convention Center.

During May 2008, Colonel Omar Hashi Aden of the ARS, along with members of the ICU, held a rally in Hiran region. It was the first time he had been in Somalia since the invasion and reflected the growing strength of the insurgency in the region.

== Negotiations with TFG and ARS split ==
The ARS was deeply divided over a peace agreement with the TFG and split into two factions over the issue. One wing in Djibouti was led by Sharif Sheikh Ahmed, who were willing to engage in peace talks despite the presence of Ethiopian forces, and those in Asmara led by Hassan Dahir Aweys who insist the Ethiopians must leave before any dialogue with the TFG took place. During July 2008, the ARS completely split into these two camps.

== The Djibouti Agreement ==
The Djibouti Agreement was a peace agreement signed by the ARS–D and the Transitional Federal Government in 2008. In January 2009 head of the ARS–D wing, and former head of the ICU, Sharif Sheikh Ahmed was elected President of Somalia by the Somali Transitional Parliament.

- Copy of Djibouti Agreement signed between the ARS–D and TFG – (9 June 2008)
