= European Partnership for Democracy =

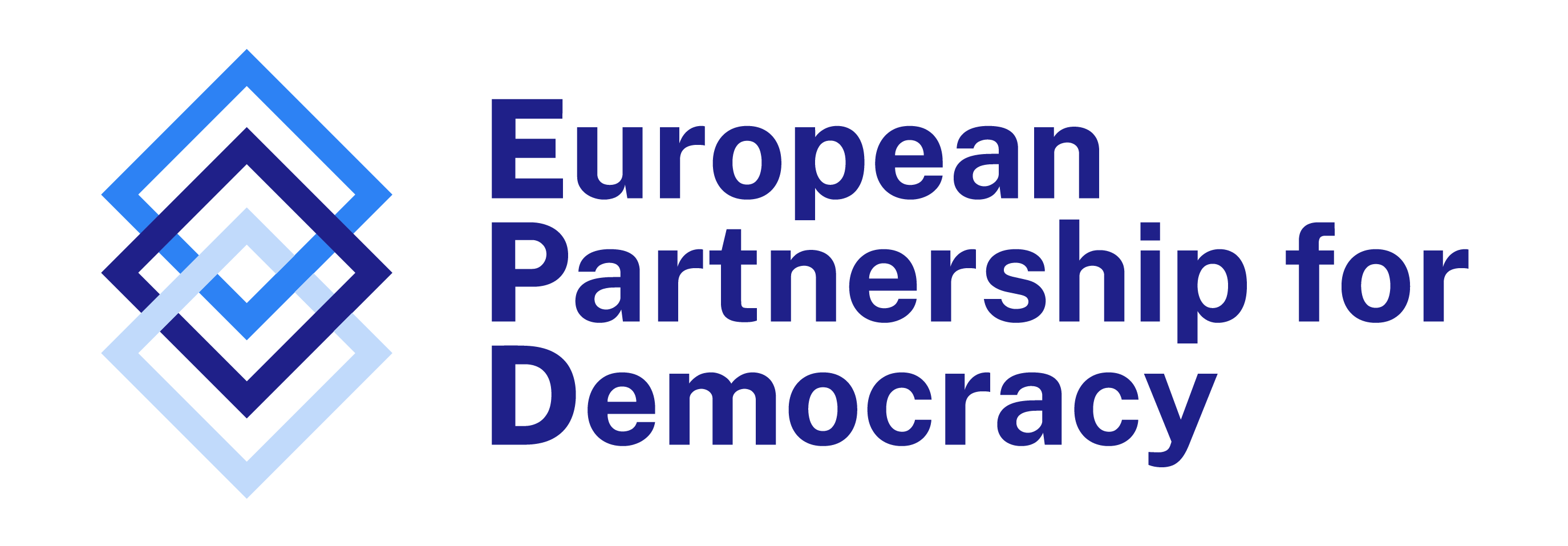
- Headquarters: Rue Froissart 123-133, B-1040 Bruxelles
- President: Anu Juvonen, Demo Finland
- Vice-President: María Elena Agüero, Club de Madrid
- Treasurer: Anthony Smith, Westminster Foundation for Democracy
- Executive Director: Ken Godfrey
- Board of directors: María Elena Agüero, Club of Madrid; Joeri Buhrer Tavanier, Netherlands Helsinki Committee; Alan Dreanic, CFI Media Development; Anu Juvonen, Demo Finland; Corinne Momal-Vanian Kofi Annan Foundation; Michael Meyer-Resende, Democracy Reporting International (DRI); Tijmen Rooseboom, Netherlands Institute for Multiparty Democracy (NIMD); Anthony Smith, Westminster Foundation for Democracy; Antonella Valmorbida, European Association for Local Democracy;
- Website: epd.eu

The European Partnership for Democracy (EPD) is a membership-based network of not-for-profit organisations with a global remit to support democracy.

EPD is composed of 20 European organisations with activities in over 140 countries in Africa, Asia, Europe, the Middle East and Latin America. It is the most important European network on democracy support and a leading voice on democracy worldwide. The EPD Secretariat is headquartered in Brussels, Belgium.

== Creation ==
The European Partnership for Democracy was created in April 2008 with backing from several European governments. The launch was opened by Czech President Vaclav Havel, who stated:

“I believe that this new foundation is one of many conceivable ways of demonstrating how the old European idea of joint responsibility for this planet lives on in a unifying Europe and is still relevant in our global world. From my own experience, I know how enormously important it is for those who in one way or another are fighting for human rights or against authoritarian regimes to receive attention or assistance from the democratic world.”

In his historical dictionary of democracy, scholar Norman Abjorensen writes that EPD "was set up to further European democracy assistance across the world, and has operated in about 140 countries, working with civil society organizations, faith-based organisations, media outlets, elections-management bodies, the private sector, political parties, elected institutions at national and local levels, and the security and justice sectors."

== Objectives and functioning ==
EPD collaborates with Carnegie Endowment for International Peace on the European Democracy Hub, a permanent hub for expertise on democracy support seeking to fill the gap between programme evaluations and global assessments of the state of democracy, with analysis and evidence-gathering of European democracy support policies and programming.

== Internal organisation ==
EPD's organisational structure is composed of a general assembly composed of all member organisations, a Board of Directors and a Secretariat. EPD is managed by a Board of Directors composed of eight members elected among the organisations composing EPD. The board is composed of a president, currently Anu Juvonen, the executive director of Demo Finland, a Vice-President, currently María Elena Agüero, a Vice-President, currently María Elena Agüero, the secretary general of Club de Madrid and a treasurer, currently Anthony Smith, the chief executive officer of the Westminster Foundation for Democracy.

The EPD Secretariat is based in Brussels and is in charge of the daily activities of the partnership. It is led by an Executive Director, Ken Godfrey.

== Members ==
- ALDA - European Association for Local Democracy
- Article 19
- Institute for Political Sciences of the Catholic University of Portugal
- CFI Media Development
- Club de Madrid
- DD Foundation
- Demo Finland
- Democracy Reporting International
- Danish Institute for Parties and Democracy
- EDGE Foundation
- Elbarlament
- Election-Watch.EU
- European Exchange
- Free Press Unlimited
- Kofi Annan Foundation
- Netherlands Helsinki Committee
- Netherlands Institute for Multiparty Democracy
- People in Need
- The Oslo Centre
- Westminster Foundation for Democracy
