= Democracy promotion =

Domestic or foreign policy to increase democratic rule

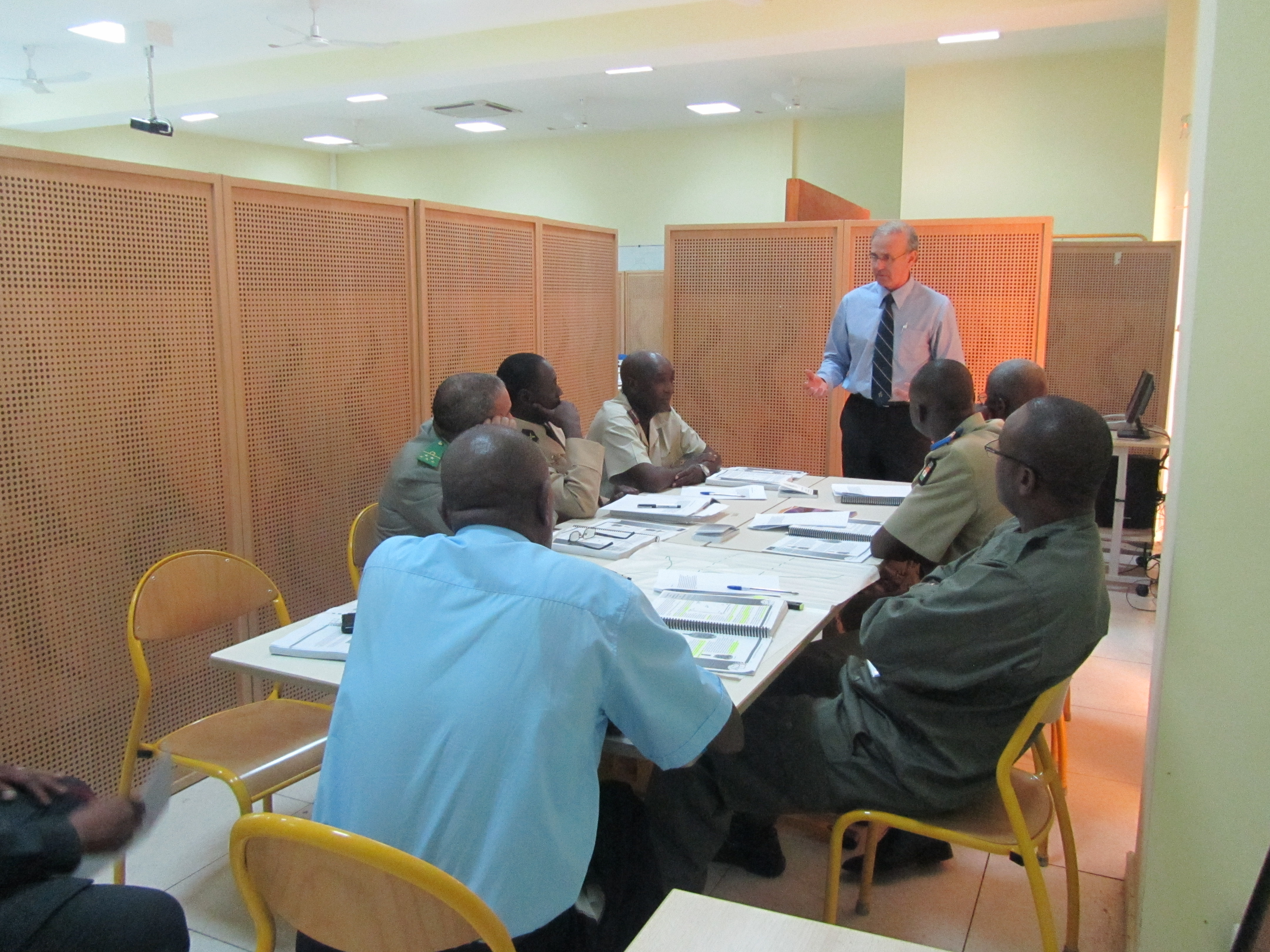
Peacekeeping is conducive to democracy promotion and building in the developing world. Here, facilitator and former MICAH Police Commissioner Yves Bouchard shares mission experience with senior military and police officials in mission management to contribute to African Union peacekeeping missions. The Planification Avancée des Missions Intégrées (APIM), or Advanced Mission Planning Course, was held by the Pearson Centre at Bamako's Ecole de maintien de la paix.

Democracy promotion, also referred to as democracy building, can be domestic policy to increase the quality of already existing democracy or a strand of foreign policy adopted by governments and international organizations that seek to support the spread of democracy as a system of government. In practice, it entails consolidating and building democratic institutions.

International democracy promotion typically takes three forms: assistance, monitoring, and conditionality. In financial terms, democracy promotion grew from 2% of aid in 1990 to nearly 20% in 2005. More controversially and rare, it can also take the form of military intervention.

== Definitions ==
The precise definition of democracy promotion has been debated for more than twenty-five years. The multiplicity of terms used is a manifestation of the plurality of opinions and approaches by international actors, be they governments, NGOs or other third parties. For example, the term 'promotion' itself can be seen by some as too intrusive, or implying outside interference, whilst 'support' can be seen by some as more benign but, by others, as insufficiently assertive. In the early twenty-first century, the differences tended to divide into two main camps: those who see it as a political process versus those who see it as a developmental process (see international relations and development aid for context).

This basic division between the political and developmental approaches has existed inchoately in the field of democracy support for many years. It has come into sharper relief during this decade, as democracy-aid providers face a world increasingly populated by countries not conforming to clear or coherent political transitional paths. [...] Some adherents of the developmental approach criticize the political approach as too easily turning confrontational vis-à-vis "host" governments and producing unhelpful counterreactions. Some adherents of the political approach, meanwhile, fault the developmental approach for being too vague and unassertive in a world where many leaders have learned to play a reform game with the international community, absorbing significant amounts of external political aid while avoiding genuine democratization.

— Thomas Carothers, 2009, in Journal of Democracy

At least part of the problem lies in the absence of a consensus on what democracy constitutes. W. B. Gallie argued that it is impossible to find a consensus definition, and instead included democracy in a list of 'essentially contested concepts'. To date, the disagreement over definitions has seen some actors focus on supporting technical systems of democratic governance (elections, government structures and the like), while others take the bottom-up approach of promoting citizen participation and building strong civil and political society to prepare the ground on which systems of government can then be planted.

The European Partnership for Democracy defines 'democracy support' as the political or financial "efforts to reinforce or create democratic development or to halt autocratisation", while 'democracy assistance' refers to financial flows "in the spirit of 'international assistance". EPD further acknowledges that 'democracy promotion' is the term widespreadly used by academics but has a more active and often coercive connotation compared to 'democracy support'. Support is something given to existing internal efforts for democratisation while promotion does not require any such internal (national) desire".

Another definition of democracy support can be drawn from the OECD Development Assistance Committee's aid flow database. The classification makes the distinction between different types of aid flows relevant for democracy assistance, such as democratic participation and civil society, elections, legislatures and political parties, media and free flow of information, human rights, women's rights organisations and movement and government, decentralisation and support to subnational government institutions, and anti-corruption organisations and institutions.

The types and objectives of democracy assistance aid delivered by international donors depend on the history of their own country with democracy, and may explain the diversity of democracy promotion contexts. If historically Western countries championed democracy promotion worldwide, new non-Western actors have emerged in the last decades with particular goals and geographical reaches, participating in the construction of a broad definition of democracy promotion.

== Foreign policy types ==
External democracy promotion has two main patterns that depend on the type of democratization a state is dealing with: external intervention and as a solution to civil war, or supporting an internal push for reform. Democracy promotion advocates are divided on which pattern tends to be most successful for the resources that democracy promotion programs invest; they are similarly divided on which components and factors of the democratization process are most important to the success of democratic consolidation.

=== Post-civil war democratization ===
Civil wars cause a number of problems for democratization. Laura Armey and Robert McNab found that the longer a civil war lasts, and the more casualties it produces, the more hostile the warring factions become to each other; this hostility in turn makes stabilization along terms of peaceful competition, required in a democratic regime, more difficult. Problematically for democracy promotion, the same study found that quick, decisive victories for one faction—even an ostensibly pro-democratic rebellion—similarly discourage peaceful, electoral competition for control of a government after the conflict is over. Leonard Wantchekon has suggested that one of the most reliable forces of democratization is a stalemated civil war, in which the original motivation for the conflict becomes irrelevant as the costs mount; this impels the factions to turn to a combination of internal and external arbitrators to forge a power-sharing agreement: elections and outside, neutral institutions to guarantee that every faction participates in the new democracy fairly.

==== External intervention ====
External interventions see different levels of democratization success depending on the type of intervener, type of intervention, and level of elite cooperation prior to the intervention. The level of neutrality and geopolitical disinterest the intervener possesses is important, as is the severity of the intervention's infringement on sovereignty. The differences can be highlighted with several examples: a neutral, mostly unobtrusive monitor missions like UN election observers in Nicaragua in 1989; the multilateral NATO IFOR mission in Yugoslavia to enforce UN Security Council Resolution 1031 in 1995; the unilateral destabilizing intervention represented by the American invasion of Iraq in 2003 and the stabilizing intervention represented by United States invasion of Panama. All these missions aimed on some level to promote democracy, with varying degrees of success. Michael Doyle and Nicholas Sambanis have found that the peacekeeping missions most successful at producing fledgling democracies have strong mandates backing them up, but tend not to revolve around military enforcement. Successful democratizing interventions consist of monitoring factions' adherence to their negotiated settlement, while the most successful ones include extensive state-building (such as improving government efficiency and professionalism, or classical infrastructure assistance) or prior experience with democracy.

==== Problems with external intervention ====
Interventions that fail to expend resources on state-building can sometimes be counter-productive to democracy promotion because, as McBride, Milante, and Skaperdas have proposed, a negotiated settlement to a civil war is based on individual factions' faith in the state's unbiased distribution of the benefits of stability; an external intervention shakes that faith by implying that such faith was misplaced to begin with. An additional problem raised by Marina Ottaway is that interventions too often rush to implement formal democratic institutions, such as elections, without allowing time for competing elites to separate responsibly; because of the short timeframe, they either unite into a new authoritarian arrangement or rely on overly divisive party platforms, such as identity, which precludes "permanent fragmentation" of the elite within a cooperative regime framework. A final concern raised with external interventions, particularly unilateral or narrowly multilateral ones, is the perception or actualization of imperialism or neo-imperialism in the name of human rights or democracy by an interested party, which, she theorizes, spawns counter-productive nationalist backlash; however, even neutral monitors must be careful that their reports do not invite a unilateral intervention, as the Council of Freely-Elected Heads of Government's 1989 report on Panamanian election fraud did for the United States.

=== Gradual reformism and the four-player game ===
Another school of thought on how democratization most successfully occurs involves an authoritarian regime transitioning to a democratic one as a result of gradual reforms over time. The basic mechanism for this is a four-player game theoretical set-up in which (1) moderate regime and (2) moderate opposition figures form a pro-democratic reform coalition to sideline (3) core regime members and (4) opposition calling for radical pro-democratic changes, with the aim of making the state more democratic while preserving its stability. Alfred Stepan and Juan Linz argue that this model requires both a highly institutionalized regime and public sphere. The regime must not be sultanistic (based entirely around one central ruler's desires) in order that different members retain some degree of autonomy and have different interests; meanwhile, in the public sphere, there must be a strong civil society that can both maintain pressure on the authoritarian regime while also providing support for the reform pact and the moderates who formulated it. According to Ray Salvatore Jennings, during the second half of the twentieth century, the success of democratic transitions depended substantially on the ability of civil society organizations (CSOs) to disseminate dissident information to counter authoritarian regimes' narratives, as well as their mobilizing high voter turnout and monitoring the first elections to prevent interference by hardliner members of the regime. Further, many scholars partial to the gradual reformism perspective on democratization agree with Francis Fukuyama, who asserts that the role of CSOs in directing the part of individuals' lives not under the liberal democratic state's control makes CSOs critical to sustaining the social capital and self-advocacy important for liberal democracy.

==== Conflict over support for internal reform ====
Even beyond the question of what and whether external intervention is an effective democracy support strategy, a number of issues continue to divide the proponents of a democracy support-based international policy. Carles Boix and Susan Stokes advocate economic development aid, contending that the more advanced an economy, the less willing factions will be to break the peace; others, however, contend that this strategy is only useful at defending democratic consolidation, and not at encouraging democratization of regimes where one faction already dominates. Still others fall in Freytag and Heckelman's camp, advocating the long-game, positing that although USAID programs have so far had little net effect on democratization, they have demonstrably improved basic democratic features, including civil society and the electoral process, in countries receiving aid.

Not all CSOs will be helpful in promoting democracy—if the organization is too large to inspire its members, or its constituents' identity is too narrowly defined, the organization will fail to support four-player democratic transition pacts, and may even encourage divisiveness and civil war. There is also some concern that the international community may be propping up NGOs to the point that they themselves become an unrepresentative elite.

== Domestic policy types ==
Domestic policies can improve the quality of democracies, and reduce the chance of democratic backsliding. Democracy promotion measures include voting advice applications, participatory democracy, increasing youth suffrage, increasing civic education, and electoral reforms such as reducing barriers to entry to candidacy and politics, and reducing the concentration of political power in the hands of one individual.

== See also ==
- Exporting the revolution
- Foreign funding of NGOs
- Democracy promotion by the United States
- Democratic backsliding
- Nation-building
- United States involvement in regime change
