= 2014 American raid in Libya =

2014 U.S. military operation in Benghazi, Libya

- Part of U.S. retaliation for the Benghazi attack, Insurgency in the Maghreb
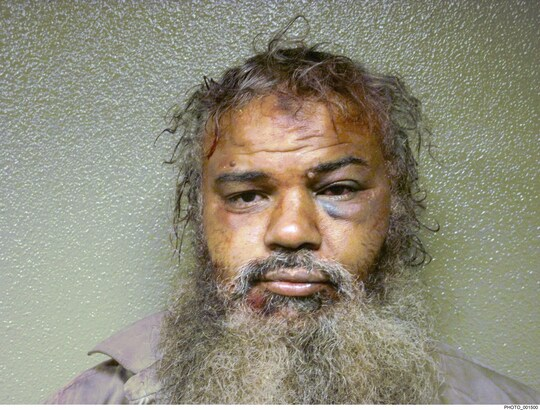
- Ahmed Abu Khattala photographed after being detained by U.S. Forces
Date	June 14, 2014
Location	Outside Benghazi
Result	Capture of Ahmed Abu Khattala

Belligerents
United States	Abu Khattala's Group

Commanders and leaders
(United States) Barack Obama	Ahmed Abu Khattala

Strength
Delta Force troops FBI agents	1

Casualties and losses
None	1 captured

The 2014 American raid in Libya refers to the capture of Ahmed Abu Khattala by U.S. troops and law enforcement agents during a late night raid in Libya. The raid was carried out on a coastal villa and seized Khattala before bringing him aboard a U.S. warship to be brought to the United States for legal proceedings.

== Background ==
Ahmed Abu Khattala, a militia leader and former prisoner under the Gaddafi regime, was charged in a sealed indictment in August 2013 for his role in the attack on a U.S. diplomatic facility in Benghazi which killed four Americans, including the U.S. ambassador, J. Christopher Stevens. In 2013, Abu Anas al-Libi, a Libyan militant wanted for his role in the 1998 United States embassy bombings was seized in Tripoli by U.S. troops.

== Raid ==
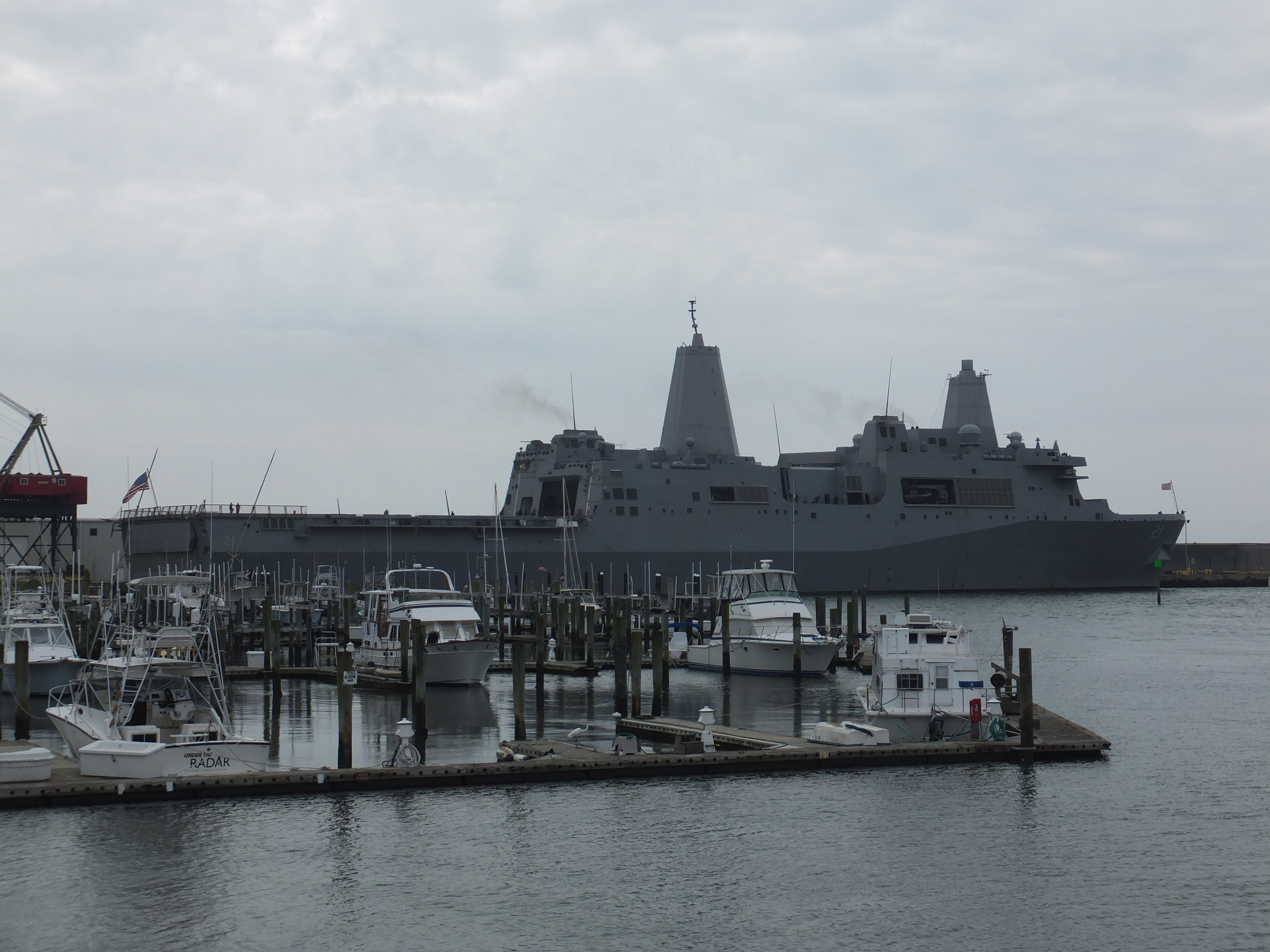
The USS New York in May 2014

On the night of 14–15 June 2014, Abu Khattala was lured by an informant to an isolated coastal villa in Libya where he was seized by Delta Force operators and Federal Bureau of Investigation (FBI) agents. According to court records, Abu Khattala was armed with a handgun, violently resisted capture, and was wounded during the capture, requiring medical treatment. He was handcuffed, blindfolded, gagged, and earmuffed before being transported to the USS New York which transported him to Washington, D.C.

== Aftermath ==
Abu Khattala was convicted to a 22-year prison sentence on four terrorism-related charges in November 2017.

His sentence was overturned in July 2022 by the D.C. Circuit Court of Appeals who ruled that a 22-year sentence was too short given the gravity of Khattala's crimes and the vital need to deter such crimes. On September 26, 2024, Khattala was resentenced to 28 years in prison, despite federal prosecutors seeking at least 60 years to life. The new sentence consists of eighteen years for destroying a federal building, to be served concurrently with fifteen years for the crimes of conspiracy to and providing material support and resources to terrorists, and an additional ten years for carrying a semiautomatic assault weapon during a crime of violence.
