= Timeline of United States military operations =

This timeline of United States military operations, based in part on reports by the Congressional Research Service, shows the years and places in which United States Armed Forces units participated in armed conflicts or occupation of foreign territories. Items in bold are wars most often considered to be major conflicts by historians and the general public.

Note that instances where the U.S. government gave aid alone, with no military personnel involvement, are excluded, as are Central Intelligence Agency operations. In domestic peacetime disputes such as riots and labor issues, only operations undertaken by active duty personnel (also called "federal troops" or "U.S. military") are depicted in this article; state defense forces and the National Guard are not included, as they are not fully integrated into the U.S. Armed Forces even if they are federalized for duty within the United States itself.

== Conflict names and dates ==
Throughout its history, the United States has engaged in numerous military conflicts. The country has officially declared war on foreign nations on five occasions. Additionally, the United States Congress and the United Nations Security Council have authorized and funded various military engagements. In the military, specific names are assigned to operations and phases of wars. For example, during the Gulf War, operations were designated as Desert Shield, Desert Storm, and Desert Sabre. Furthermore, each operation may encompass distinct phases, each with its own unique name.

== Extraterritorial and major domestic deployments ==
Portions of this list are from the Congressional Research Service report RL30172, version of October 5, 2004.

=== 1775–1799 ===
1775–1783: American Revolutionary War: an armed struggle for secession from the British Empire by the Thirteen Colonies that would subsequently become the United States.

1776–1777: Cherokee War of 1776: a series of armed conflicts when the Cherokee fought to prevent the encroachment of American settlers into eastern Tennessee and eastern Kentucky; under British rule, this land had been preserved as native territory.

1776–1794: Cherokee–American wars: a continuation of the Second Cherokee War, which included a larger number of native tribes attempting to halt the expansion of settlers into Kentucky and Tennessee

1785–1795: Northwest Indian War: a series of battles with various native tribes in present-day Ohio. The goal of the campaign was to affirm American sovereignty over the region and to create increased opportunities for settlement.

1786–1787: Shays' Rebellion: a Western Massachusetts debtor's revolt over a credit squeeze that had financially devastated many farmers. The federal government was fiscally unable to raise an army to assist the state militia in combating the uprising; the weakness of the national government bolstered the arguments in favor of replacing the Articles of Confederation with an updated governmental framework.

1791–1794: Whiskey Rebellion: a series of protests against the institution of a federal tax on the distillation of spirits as a revenue source for repaying the nation's war bonds. The revolt was centered upon southwestern Pennsylvania, although violence occurred throughout the Trans-Appalachian region.

1798–1800: Quasi-War: an undeclared naval war with the French First Republic over American default on its war debt. Another contributing factor was the continuation of American trade with Britain, with whom their former French allies were at war. This contest included land actions, such as that in the Dominican Republic city of Puerto Plata, where U.S. Marines captured a French vessel under the guns of the forts. Congress authorized military action through a series of statutes.

1799–1800: Fries's Rebellion: a string of protests against the enactment of new real estate taxes to pay for the Quasi-War. Hostilities were concentrated in the communities of the Pennsylvania Dutch.

=== 1800s ===
1801–1805: First Barbary War: a series of naval battles in the Mediterranean against the Kingdom of Tripoli, a quasi-independent state of the Ottoman Empire. Action was in response to the capture of numerous American ships by the infamous Barbary pirates. The federal government rejected the Tripolitan request for an annual tribute to guarantee safe passage, and an American naval blockade ensued. After the seizure of USS Philadelphia, American forces under William Eaton invaded coastal cities. A peace treaty resulted in the payment of a ransom for the return of captured American soldiers and only temporarily eased hostilities.

1806: Pike Expedition: On an exploratory expedition ordered by Gen. James Wilkinson, an Army platoon under Captain Zebulon Pike unintentionally entered Spanish Mexico at the headwaters of the Rio Grande. Pike and his troops were made prisoner without resistance at a fort he constructed in present-day Colorado, taken to Mexico, and later released after seizure of his papers.^{[RL30172]}

1806–1810: Action in the Gulf of Mexico: American gunboats operated from New Orleans against Spanish and French privateers off the Mississippi Delta, chiefly under Captain John Shaw and Commodore David Porter.

=== 1810s ===
1810: West Florida (Spanish territory): Governor William C. C. Claiborne of Louisiana, on orders of President James Madison, occupied with troops territory in dispute east of the Mississippi River as far as the Pearl River, later the eastern boundary of Louisiana. He was authorized to seize as far east as the Perdido River.^{[RL30172]}

1812: Amelia Island and other parts of east Florida, then under Spain: Temporary possession was authorized by President James Madison and by Congress, to prevent occupation by any other power; but possession was obtained by General George Mathews in so irregular a manner that his measures were disavowed by the President.^{[RL30172]}

1812–1815: War of 1812: On June 18, 1812, the United States declared war against the United Kingdom. Among the issues leading to the war were British impressment of American sailors into the Royal Navy, interception of neutral ships and blockades of the United States during British hostilities with France, and support for Indian attacks on American settlers in the Northwest Territory. ^{[RL30172]} The war ended with the Battle of New Orleans in 1815.

1813: West Florida (Spanish territory): On authority given by Congress, General Wilkinson seized Mobile Bay in April with 600 soldiers. A small Spanish garrison gave way. Thus U.S. troops advanced into disputed territory to the Perdido River, as projected in 1810. No fighting.^{[RL30172]}

1813–1814: Nuku Hiva Campaign: U.S. forces built a fort on the island of Nuku Hiva in the Marquesas Islands (now part of French Polynesia) to protect three prize ships which had been captured from the British. The American force subsequently fought with and against native tribes. ^{[RL30172]}

1814: Spanish Florida: General Andrew Jackson took Pensacola and drove out the British forces.^{[RL30172]}

1814–1825: Caribbean: Engagements between pirates and U.S. Navy ships or squadrons took place repeatedly especially ashore and offshore about Cuba, Puerto Rico, Santo Domingo, and Yucatán. Three thousand pirate attacks on merchantmen were reported between 1815 and 1823. In 1822, Commodore James Biddle employed a squadron of two frigates, four sloops of war, two brigs, four schooners, and two gunboats in the West Indies.^{[RL30172]}

1815: Algiers: The Second Barbary War was declared against the United States by the Dey of Algiers of the Barbary states, an act not reciprocated by the United States. Congress did authorize a military expedition by statute. A large fleet under Captain Stephen Decatur attacked Algiers and obtained indemnities.^{[RL30172]}

1815: Tripoli: After securing an agreement from Algiers, Captain Stephen Decatur demonstrated with his squadron at Tunis and Tripoli, where he secured indemnities for offenses during the War of 1812.^{[RL30172]}

1816: Spanish Florida: United States forces destroyed Negro Fort, which harbored fugitive slaves making raids into United States territory.^{[RL30172]}

1816–1818: Spanish Florida – First Seminole War: The Seminole Indians, whose area was a haven for escaped slaves and border ruffians, were attacked by troops under General Jackson and General Edmund P. Gaines and pursued into northern Florida. Spanish posts were attacked and occupied, British citizens executed. In 1819 the Floridas were ceded to the United States.^{[RL30172]}

1817: Amelia Island (Spanish territory off Florida): Under orders of President James Monroe, United States forces landed and expelled a group of smugglers, adventurers, and freebooters. This episode in Florida's history became known as the Amelia Island Affair.^{[RL30172]}

1818: Oregon: USS Ontario, dispatched from Washington, made a landing at the mouth of the Columbia River to assert U.S. claims. Britain had conceded sovereignty but Russia and Spain asserted claims to the area.^{[RL30172]} Subsequently, American and British claims to the Oregon Country were resolved with the Oregon Treaty of 1846.^{[RL30172]}

=== 1820s ===
1820–1823: Africa: Naval units raided the slave traffic pursuant to the 1819 act of Congress.^{[RL30172]}^{[Slave Traffic]}

1822: Spanish Cuba: United States naval forces suppressing piracy landed on the northwest coast of Cuba and burned a pirate station.^{[RL30172]}

1823: Cuba: Brief landings in pursuit of pirates occurred April 8 near Escondido; April 16 near Cayo Blanco; July 11 at Siquapa Bay; July 21 at Cape Cruz; and October 23 at Camrioca.^{[RL30172]}

1823: Arikara War.

1824: Cuba: In October USS Porpoise landed sailors near Matanzas in pursuit of pirates. This was during the cruise authorized in 1822.^{[RL30172]}

1824: Puerto Rico (Spanish territory): Commodore David Porter with a landing party attacked the town of Fajardo which had sheltered pirates and insulted naval officers. He landed with 200 men in November and forced an apology. Commodore Porter was later court-martialed for overstepping his powers.^{[RL30172]}

1825: Cuba: In March cooperating American and British forces landed at Sagua La Grande to capture pirates.^{[RL30172]}

1827: Greece: In October and November, landing parties hunted pirates on the Mediterranean islands of Argentiere (Kimolos), Myconos, and Andros.^{[RL30172]}

=== 1830s ===
1831: Falkland Islands: Captain Silas Duncan of USS Lexington attacked, looted and burned Puerto Soledad (then under the control of the United Provinces of the Río de la Plata). This was in response to the capture of three American sailing vessels which were detained after ignoring orders to stop depredation of local fishing resources without permission from the United Provinces government.^{[RL30172]}

1832: First Sumatran expedition: Sumatra, Indonesia – February 6 to 9, U.S. forces under Commodore John Downes aboard the frigate USS Potomac landed and stormed a fort to punish natives of the town of Quallah Battoo for plundering the American cargo ship Friendship.^{[RL30172]}

1833: Argentina: October 31 to November 15, A force was sent ashore at Buenos Aires to protect the interests of the United States and other countries during an insurrection.^{[RL30172]}

1835–1836: Peru: December 10, 1835, to January 24, 1836, and August 31 to December 7, 1836, Marines protected American interests in Callao and Lima during an attempted revolution.^{[RL30172]}

1835–1842: Florida Territory: United States Navy supports the Army's efforts at quelling uprisings and attacks on civilians by Seminole Indians. Government's efforts to relocate the Seminoles to west of the Mississippi are hindered by 7 years of war.

1838: The Caroline affair on Navy Island, Upper Canada: After the failure of the Upper Canada Rebellion of 1837 favoring Canadian democracy and independence from the British Empire; William Lyon Mackenzie and his rebels fled to Navy Island where they declared the Republic of Canada. American sympathizers sent supplies on SS Caroline, which was intercepted by the British and set ablaze, after killing one American. It was falsely reported that dozens of Americans were killed as they were trapped on board, and American forces retaliated by burning a British steamer while it was in U.S. waters.

1838–1839: Second Sumatran expedition: Sumatra, Indonesia – December 24 to January 4, a naval force landed to punish natives of the towns of Quallah Battoo and Muckie (Mukki) for depredations on American shipping.^{[RL30172]}

=== 1840s ===
1840: Fiji Islands: In July, naval forces landed to punish natives for attacking the U.S. Exploring Expedition.^{[RL30172]}

1841: McKean Island (Drummond Island/Taputenea), Gilbert Islands (Kingsmill Group), Pacific Ocean: A naval party landed to avenge the murder of a seaman by the natives.^{[RL30172]}

1841: Samoa: On February 24, a naval party landed and burned towns after the murder of an American seaman on Upolu.^{[RL30172]}

1842: Mexico: Commodore Thomas ap Catesby Jones, in command of a squadron long cruising off California, occupied Monterey, California, on October 19, believing war had come. He discovered peace, withdrew, and saluted. A similar incident occurred a week later at San Diego.^{[RL30172]}

1843: China: Sailors and marines from USS St. Louis were landed after a clash between Americans and Chinese at the trading post in Canton.^{[RL30172]}

1843: Africa: From November 29 to December 16, four United States vessels demonstrated and landed various parties (one of 200 marines and sailors) to discourage piracy and the slave trade along the Ivory Coast, and to punish attacks by the natives on American seamen and shipping.^{[RL30172]}

1844: Mexico: President John Tyler deployed U.S. forces to protect Texas against Mexico, pending Senate approval of a treaty of annexation (which was later rejected). He defended his action against a Senate resolution of inquiry.^{[RL30172]}

1846–1848: Mexican–American War: On May 13, 1846, the United States recognized the existence of a state of war with Mexico. After the annexation of Texas in 1845, the United States and Mexico failed to resolve a boundary dispute and President Polk said that it was necessary to deploy forces in Mexico to meet a threatened invasion.

The war ended with the Treaty of Guadalupe Hidalgo, signed on February 2, 1848. The treaty gave the U.S. undisputed control of Texas, established the U.S.–Mexican border of the Rio Grande, and ceded to the United States the present-day states of California, Nevada, Utah, Arizona, New Mexico, Wyoming, and parts of Colorado. In return, Mexico received US$18,250,000 (equivalent to about $679,000,000 in 2025)—less than half the amount the U.S. had attempted to offer Mexico for the land before the opening of hostilities.^{[RL30172]}

1849: Smyrna (İzmir, Turkey): In July, a naval force gained release of an American seized by Austrian officials.^{[RL30172]}

=== 1850s ===
1851: Ottoman Empire: After a massacre of foreigners (including Americans) at Jaffa in January, a demonstration by the Mediterranean Squadron was ordered along the Turkish (Levantine) coast.^{[RL30172]}

1851: Johanna Island (modern Anjouan, east of Africa): In August, forces from the sloop-of-war USS Dale exacted redress for the unlawful imprisonment of the captain of an American whaling brig.^{[RL30172]}

1852–1853: Argentina: February 3 to 12, 1852; September 17, 1852, to April 1853: Marines were landed and maintained in Buenos Aires to protect American interests during a revolution.^{[RL30172]}

1853: Nicaragua: March 11 to 13, U.S. forces landed to protect American lives and interests during political disturbances.^{[RL30172]}

1853–1854: Japan: Commodore Matthew Perry and his expedition made a display of force leading to the "opening of Japan".^{[RL30172]}

1853–1854: Ryukyu and Bonin Islands (Japan): Commodore Matthew Perry on three visits before going to Japan and while waiting for a reply from Japan made a naval demonstration, landing marines twice, and secured a coaling concession from the ruler of Naha on Okinawa; he also demonstrated in the Bonin Islands with the purpose of securing facilities for commerce.^{[RL30172]}

1854: China: April 4 to June 17, American and British ships landed forces to protect American interests in and near Shanghai during Chinese civil strife.^{[RL30172]}

1854: Mosquito Coast (Nicaragua): On July 9–15, naval forces bombarded and burned San Juan del Norte (Greytown) to avenge an injured during a riot to the American Minister to Nicaragua.

1855: China: On May 19–21, U.S. forces protected American interests in Shanghai and, from August 3 to 5 fought pirates near Hong Kong.^{[RL30172]}

1855: Fiji expedition: From September 12 to November 4, a naval force landed on the Fiji islands to seek reparations for attacks on American residents and seamen.^{[RL30172]}

1855: Uruguay: On November 25–29, United States and European naval forces landed to protect American interests during an attempted revolution in Montevideo.^{[RL30172]}

1856: Panama State, Republic of New Granada: On September 19–22, U.S. forces landed to protect American interests during an insurrection.^{[RL30172]}

1856: China: From October 22 to December 6, U.S. forces landed to protect American interests at Canton during hostilities between the British and the Chinese, and to avenge an assault upon an unarmed boat displaying the United States flag.^{[RL30172]}

1857–1858: Utah War: The Utah War was a dispute between Mormon settlers in Utah Territory and the United States federal government. The Mormons and Washington each sought control over the government of the territory, with the national government victorious. The confrontation between the Mormon militia and the U.S. Army involved some destruction of property, but no actual battles between the contending military forces.

1857: Nicaragua: April to May, November to December. In May, Commander Charles Henry Davis of the United States Navy, with some marines, received the surrender of William Walker, self-proclaimed president of Nicaragua, who was losing control of the country to forces financed by his former business partner, Cornelius Vanderbilt, and protected his men from the retaliation of native allies who had been fighting Walker. In November and December of the same year United States vessels USS Saratoga, USS Wabash, and Fulton opposed another attempt of William Walker on Nicaragua. Commodore Hiram Paulding's act of landing marines and compelling the removal of Walker to the United States, was tacitly disavowed by Secretary of State Lewis Cass, and Paulding was forced into retirement.^{[RL30172]}

1858: Uruguay: From January 2 to 27, forces from two United States warships landed to protect American property during a revolution in Montevideo.^{[RL30172]}

1858: Fiji expedition: From October 6 to 16, a marine expedition with USS Vandalia killed 14 natives of the Fiji islands and burned 115 huts in retaliation for the murder of two American citizens at Waya Island.^{[RL30172]} ^{[Vandalia 1]} ^{[Vandalia 2]}

1858–1859: Ottoman Empire: Secretary of State Lewis Cass requested a display of naval force along the Levant after a massacre of Americans at Jaffa and mistreatment elsewhere "to remind the authorities (of the Ottoman Empire) of the power of the United States."^{[RL30172]}

1859: Paraguay expedition: Congress authorized a naval squadron to seek redress for an attack on naval vessel USS Water Witch in the Paraná River during 1855. Apologies were made after a large display of force.^{[RL30172]}

1859: Mexico: Two hundred United States soldiers crossed the Rio Grande in pursuit of the Mexican nationalist Juan Cortina.^{[RL30172]} ^{[1859 Mexico]}

1859: China: From July 31 to August 2, a naval force landed to protect American interests in Shanghai.^{[RL30172]}

=== 1860s ===
1860: Angola, Portuguese West Africa: On March 1, American residents at Kissembo called upon American and British ships to protect lives and property during problems with natives.^{[RL30172]}

1860: Colombia, Bay of Panama: From September 27 to October 8, naval forces landed to protect American interests during a revolution.^{[RL30172]}

1861–1865: American Civil War: A major war between the United States (the Union) and eleven Southern states which declared that they had a right to secession and formed the Confederate States of America.

1863: Japan: July 16, Battle of Shimonoseki Straits: USS Wyoming retaliated against a firing on the American vessel Pembroke at the Straits of Shimonoseki.^{[RL30172]}

1864: Japan: From July 14 to August 3, naval forces protected the United States Minister to Japan when he visited Yedo to negotiate concerning some American claims against Japan, and to make his negotiations easier by impressing the Japanese with American power.^{[RL30172]}

1864: Japan: From September 4 to 14, as part of the Shimonoseki campaign, naval forces of the United States, Great Britain, France, and the Netherlands compelled Japan and the Prince of Nagato in particular to permit the Straits of Shimonoseki to be used by foreign shipping in accordance with treaties already signed.^{[RL30172]}

1865: Panama: On March 9 and 10, U.S. forces protected the lives and property of American residents during a revolution.^{[RL30172]}

1865–1877: Southern United States – Reconstruction following the American Civil War: The South is divided into five Union occupation districts under the Reconstruction Act.

1866: Mexico: To protect American residents, General Sedgwick and 100 men in November obtained surrender of Matamoros, on the border state of Tamaulipas. After three days he was ordered by U.S. Government to withdraw. His act was repudiated by President Andrew Johnson.^{[RL30172]}

1866: China: From June 20 to July 7, U.S. forces punished an assault on the American consul at Newchwang.^{[RL30172]}

1866–1868: Red Cloud's War: war against the Lakota Sioux, Cheyenne, and Arapaho Native American groups over control of the Powder River Country and security of the Bozeman Trail in Wyoming and Montana. The allied Indian tribes achieved a victory at the Fetterman Fight and were able to negotiate favorable peace terms in the Treaty of Fort Laramie (1868), which established the Great Sioux Reservation.

1867: Nicaragua: Marines occupied Managua and Leon.

1867: Formosa (island of Taiwan): On June 13, a naval force landed and burned a number of huts to punish the murder of the crew of a wrecked American vessel.

1868: Japan (Osaka, Hiolo, Nagasaki, Yokohama, and Negata): February 4 to 8, April 4 to May 12, June 12 and 13. U.S. forces were landed to protect American interests during a civil war (Boshin War) in Japan.^{[RL30172]}

1868: Uruguay: On February 7–8, and 19–26, U.S. forces protected foreign residents and the customhouse during an insurrection at Montevideo.^{[RL30172]}

1868: Colombia: In April, U.S. forces protected passengers and treasure in transit at Aspinwall during the absence of local police or troops on the occasion of the death of President Manuel Murillo Toro.^{[RL30172]}

=== 1870s ===
1870: Battle of Boca Teacapan: On June 17 and 18, U.S. forces destroyed the pirate ship Forward, which had been run aground about 40 miles up the Teacapan Estuary in Mexico.^{[RL30172]}

1871: Korea: Shinmiyangyo – June 10 to 12, A U.S. naval force attacked and captured five forts to force stalled negotiations on trade agreements and to punish natives for depredations on Americans, particularly for executing the crew of the General Sherman and burning the schooner (which in turn happened because the crew had stolen food and kidnapped a Korean official), and for later firing on other American small boats taking soundings up the Salee River. ^{[RL30172]}

1873: Colombia (Bay of Panama): May 7 to 22, September 23 to October 9. U.S. forces protected American interests during hostilities between local groups over control of the government of the State of Panama.^{[RL30172]}

1873–1896: Mexico: United States troops crossed the Mexican border repeatedly in pursuit of cattle thieves and other brigands.^{[RL30172]}

1874: Honolulu Courthouse riot: From February 12 to 20, detachments from American vessels were landed to protect the interests of Americans living in the Hawaiian Kingdom during the coronation of King Kalākaua.^{[RL30172]}

1876: Mexico: On May 18, an American force was landed to police the town of Matamoros, Mexico, temporarily while it was without other government.^{[RL30172]}

1876–1877: Great Sioux War in the Dakota Territory, Wyoming Territory, and Montana Territory: Armed conflict with the Lakota Sioux and Cheyenne peoples over possession of the Black Hills, following the discovery of gold there. Despite Native American victories like the Battle of the Little Bighorn, the U.S. government prevailed, forcing the tribes back onto their reservations.

1878: Lincoln County, New Mexico: On July 15–19, during the Battle of Lincoln (part of the Lincoln County War) 150 cavalry-men arrived from Fort Stanton, under the command of Lieutenant George Smith (later Colonel Nathan Dudley) to assist the Murphy-Dolan Faction in attacking the Lincoln County Regulators vigilante group. 5 dead, 8–28 wounded.

=== 1880s ===
1882: Egyptian Expedition: July 14 to 18, American forces landed to protect American interests during the Anglo-Egyptian War and looting of the city of Alexandria by Arabs.^{[RL30172]}

1885: Colombia (Colón): January 18 and 19, U.S. forces were used to guard the valuables in transit over the Panama Railroad, and the safes and vaults of the company during revolutionary activity. In March, April, and May in the cities of Colón and Panama, the forces helped reestablish freedom of transit during revolutionary activity (see Burning of Colón).^{[RL30172]}

1888: Korea: June, A naval force was sent ashore to protect American residents in Seoul during unsettled political conditions, when an outbreak of the populace was expected.^{[RL30172]}

1888: Haiti: December 20, A display of force persuaded the Haitian Government to give up an American steamer which had been seized on the charge of breach of blockade.^{[RL30172]}

1888–1889: Samoan crisis; Samoan Civil War; Second Samoan Civil War: November 14, 1888, to March 20, 1889, U.S. forces were landed to protect American citizens and the consulate during a native civil war.^{[RL30172]}

1889: Kingdom of Hawaii: July 30 and 31, U.S. forces at Honolulu protected the interests of Americans living in Hawaii during an American led revolution.^{[RL30172]}

=== 1890s ===
1890: Argentina: A naval party landed to protect U.S. consulate and legation in Buenos Aires.^{[RL30172]}

1890: Wounded Knee Massacre; Pine Ridge Indian Reservation, South Dakota: On December 29, soldiers of the US Army 7th Cavalry killed 178 Lakota Sioux following an incident over a disarmament-inspection at a Lakota Sioux encampment near Wounded Knee Creek. 89 other Amerinds were injured, 150 were reported missing; Army casualties were 25 killed, 39 wounded.

1891: Haiti: U.S. forces sought to protect American lives and property on Navassa Island.^{[RL30172]}

1891: Bering Sea Anti-Poaching Operations: July 2 to October 5, naval forces sought to stop seal poaching.^{[RL30172]}

1891: Itata Incident: U.S. and European naval forces intercepted and detained a shipment of arms sent to the Congressionalist forces in the Chilean Civil War.

1891: Chile: August 28 to 30, U.S. forces protected the American consulate and the women and children who had taken refuge in it during a revolution in Valparaíso.^{[RL30172]}

1892: Homestead Strike: On July 6, striking miners attacked Pinkerton National Detective Agency agents attempting to break the strike by bringing non-union workers to the mine. 6,000 Pennsylvania state militiamen were sent to reinstate law and order. 16 dead, 27–47 wounded

1892: Wyoming: Johnson County War April 11 to 13, U.S. Cavalry sent to break up a gun battle at the TA Ranch.

1893: Overthrow of the Hawaiian Kingdom: January 16 to April 1, Marines landed in Hawaii, ostensibly to protect American lives and property, but were actually used as part of a coup to promote a Provisional Government under Sanford B. Dole. This action was disavowed by President Grover Cleveland, and the United States apologized in 1993.^{[RL30172]}

1894: Nicaragua: July 6 to August 7, U.S. forces sought to protect American interests at Bluefields following a revolution.^{[RL30172]}

1894–1895: China: Marines were stationed at Tianjin and penetrated to Beijing for protection purposes during the First Sino-Japanese War.^{[RL30172]}

1894–1895: China: A naval vessel was beached and used as a fort at Newchwang for protection of American nationals.^{[RL30172]}

1894–1896: Korea: July 24, 1894, to April 3, 1896, A guard of marines was sent to protect the American legation and American lives and interests at Seoul during and following the First Sino-Japanese War.^{[RL30172]}

1895: Colombia: March 8 and 9, U.S. forces protected American interests during an attack on the town of Bocas del Toro by a bandit chieftain.^{[RL30172]}

1896: Nicaragua: May 2 to 4, U.S. forces protected American interests in Corinto during political unrest.^{[RL30172]}

1898: Nicaragua: February 7 and 8, U.S. forces protected American lives and property at San Juan del Sur.^{[RL30172]}

1898: Spanish–American War: On April 25, 1898, the United States declared war with Spain, ostensibly aligned with Cuban rebels. The war followed a Cuban insurrection, the Cuban War of Independence against Spanish rule and the sinking of USS Maine in the harbor at Havana.^{[RL30172]}

1898–1899: Samoa: Second Samoan Civil War, a conflict that reached a head in 1898 when Germany, the United Kingdom, and the United States were locked in dispute over who should have control over the Samoan island chain.

1898–1899: China: November 5, 1898, to March 15, 1899, U.S. forces provided a guard for the legation at Beijing and the consulate at Tianjin during contest between the Dowager Empress and her son.^{[RL30172]}

1899: Nicaragua: American and British naval forces were landed to protect national interests at San Juan del Norte, February 22 to March 5, and at Bluefields a few weeks later in connection with the insurrection of Gen. Juan P. Reyes.^{[RL30172]}

1899–1913: Philippine Islands: Philippine–American War, U.S. forces protected American interests following the war with Spain, defeating Filipino revolutionaries seeking immediate national independence.^{[RL30172]} The U.S. government declared the insurgency officially over in 1902, when the Filipino leadership generally accepted American rule. Skirmishes between government troops and armed groups lasted until 1913, and some historians consider these unofficial extensions of the war.

=== 1900s ===
1900: China: From May 24 to September 28, Boxer Rebellion. American troops participated in operations to protect foreign lives during the Boxer uprising, particularly at Beijing. For many years after this experience a permanent legation guard was maintained in Beijing, and was strengthened at times as trouble threatened.^{[RL30172]}

1901: Colombia (State of Panama): From November 20 to December 4. (See: Separation of Panama from Colombia) U.S. forces protected American property on the Isthmus and kept transit lines open during serious revolutionary disturbances.^{[RL30172]}

1902: Colombia: From April 16 to 23, U.S. forces protected American lives and property at Bocas del Toro during a civil war.^{[RL30172]}

1902: Colombia (State of Panama): From September 17 to November 18, the United States placed armed guards on all trains crossing the Isthmus to keep the railroad line open, and stationed ships on both sides of Panama to prevent the landing of Colombian troops.^{[RL30172]}

1903: Honduras: From March 23 to 30 or 31, U.S. forces protected the American consulate and the steamship wharf at Puerto Cortes during a period of revolutionary activity.^{[RL30172]}

1903: Dominican Republic: From March 30 to April 21, a detachment of marines was landed to protect American interests in the city of Santo Domingo during a revolutionary outbreak.^{[RL30172]}

1903: Syria: From September 7 to 12, U.S. forces protected the American consulate in Beirut when a local Muslim uprising was feared.^{[RL30172]}

1903–1904: Abyssinia (Ethiopia): Twenty-five Marines were sent to Abyssinia to protect the U.S. Consul General while he negotiated a treaty.^{[RL30172]}

1903–1914: Panama: U.S. forces sought to protect American interests and lives during and following the revolution for independence from Colombia over construction of the Isthmian Canal. With brief intermissions, United States Marines were stationed on the Isthmus from November 4, 1903, to January 21, 1914, to guard American interests.^{[RL30172]}

1904: Dominican Republic: From January 2 to February 11, American and British naval forces established an area in which no fighting would be allowed and protected American interests in Puerto Plata, Sosua, and Santo Domingo during revolutionary fighting.^{[RL30172]}

1904: Tangier, Morocco: "We want either Perdicaris alive or Raisuli dead." During the Perdicaris affair, a squadron demonstrated to force release of a kidnapped American. Marines were landed to protect the consul general.^{[RL30172]}

1904: Panama: From November 17 to 24, U.S. forces protected American lives and property at Ancon at the time of a threatened insurrection.^{[RL30172]}

1904–1905: Korea: From January 5, 1904, to November 11, 1905, a guard of Marines was sent to protect the American legation in Seoul during the Russo-Japanese War.^{[RL30172]}

1906–1909: Cuba: From September 1906 to January 23, 1909, U.S. forces sought to protect interests and re-establish a government after revolutionary activity.^{[RL30172]}

1907: Honduras: From March 18 to June 8, to protect American interests during a war between Honduras and Nicaragua, troops were stationed in Trujillo, Ceiba, Puerto Cortes, San Pedro Sula, Laguna and Choloma.^{[RL30172]}

=== 1910s ===
1910: Nicaragua: From May 19 to September 4, Occupation of Nicaragua. U.S. forces protected American interests at Bluefields.^{[RL30172]}

1911: Honduras: On January 26, American naval detachments were landed to protect American lives and interests during a civil war in Honduras.^{[RL30172]}

1911: China: As the Tongmenghui-led Xinhai Revolution approached, in October an ensign and 10 men tried to enter Wuchang to rescue missionaries but retired on being warned away, and a small landing force guarded American private property and consulate at Hankou. Marines were deployed in November to guard the cable stations at Shanghai; landing forces were sent for protection in Nanjing, Zhenjiang, Taku and elsewhere.^{[RL30172]}

1912: Honduras: A small force landed to prevent seizure by the government of an American-owned railroad at Puerto Cortes. The forces were withdrawn after the United States disapproved the action.^{[RL30172]}

1912: Panama: Troops, on request of both political parties, supervised elections outside the Panama Canal Zone.^{[RL30172]}

1912: Cuba: From June 5 to August 5, U.S. forces protected American interests in Oriente Province and in Havana.^{[RL30172]}

1912: China: August 24–26, on Kentucky Island (now known as Danzi Dao), and August 26–30 at Camp Nicholson. U.S. forces protected Americans and American interests during the Xinhai Revolution.^{[RL30172]}

1912: Turkey: From November 18 to December 3, U.S. forces guarded the American legation at Constantinople during the First Balkan War^{[RL30172]}

1912–1925: Nicaragua: From August to November 1912, U.S. forces protected American interests during an attempted revolution. A small force, serving as a legation guard and seeking to promote peace and stability, remained until August 5, 1925.^{[RL30172]}

1912–1941: China: The disorders which began with the overthrow of the dynasty during Kuomintang rebellion in 1912, which were redirected by the invasion of China by Japan, led to demonstrations and landing parties for the protection of U.S. interests in China continuously and at many points from 1912 on to 1941. The guard at Beijing and along the route to the sea was maintained until 1941. In 1927, the United States had 5,670 troops ashore in China and 44 naval vessels in its waters. In 1933 the United States had 3,027 armed men ashore. The protective action was generally based on treaties with China concluded from 1858 to 1901.^{[RL30172]}

1913: Mexico: From September 5 to 7, a few marines landed at Ciaris Estero to aid in evacuating American citizens and others from the Yaqui Valley, made dangerous for foreigners by the Mexican Revolution.^{[RL30172]}

1914: Haiti: January 29 to February 9, February 20 and 21, October 19. Intermittently, U.S. naval forces protected American nationals in a time of rioting and revolution.^{[RL30172]} The specific order from Secretary of the Navy Josephus P. Daniels to the invasion commander, Admiral William Deville Bundy, was to "protect American and foreign" interests.

1914: Dominican Republic: In June and July, during the Dominican Civil War (1914), United States naval forces by gunfire stopped the bombardment of Puerto Plata, and by threat of force maintained Santo Domingo as a neutral zone.^{[RL30172]}

1914–1917: Mexico: Tampico Affair led to Occupation of Veracruz, Mexico. Undeclared Mexican–American hostilities followed the Tampico Affair and Villa's raids . Also Pancho Villa Expedition – an abortive military operation conducted by the United States Army against the military forces of Francisco "Pancho" Villa from 1916 to 1917 and included capture of Veracruz. On March 19, 1915, on orders from President Woodrow Wilson, and with tacit consent by Venustiano Carranza. General John J. Pershing led an invasion force of 10,000 men into Mexico to capture Villa.^{[RL30172]}

1915–1934: Haiti: From July 28, 1915, to August 15, 1934, United States occupation of Haiti. U.S. forces maintained order during a period of chronic political instability.^{[RL30172]} During the initial entrance into Haiti, the specific order from the Secretary of the Navy to the invasion commander, Admiral William Deville Bundy, was to "protect American and foreign" interests.

1916: China: American forces landed to quell a riot taking place on American property in Nanjing.^{[RL30172]}

1916–1924: Dominican Republic: From May 1916 to September 1924, Occupation of the Dominican Republic. American naval forces maintained order during a period of chronic and threatened insurrection.^{[RL30172]}

1917: China: American troops were landed at Chongqing to protect American lives during a political crisis.^{[RL30172]}

1917–1918: World War I: On April 6, 1917, the United States declared war against Germany and on December 7, 1917, against Austria-Hungary. Entrance of the United States into the war was precipitated by Germany's submarine warfare against neutral shipping and the Zimmermann Telegram.^{[RL30172]}

1917–1922: Cuba: U.S. forces protected American interests during insurrection and subsequent unsettled conditions. Most of the United States armed forces left Cuba by August 1919, but two companies remained at Camaguey until February 1922.^{[RL30172]}

1918–1919: Mexico: After withdrawal of the Pershing expedition, U.S. troops entered Mexico in pursuit of bandits at least three times in 1918 and six times in 1919. In August 1918, American and Mexican troops fought at Nogales, Battle of Ambos Nogales. The incident began when German spies plotted an attack with the Mexican Army on Nogales, Arizona. The fighting began when a Mexican officer shot and killed a U.S. soldier on American soil. A full-scale battle then ensued, ending with a Mexican surrender.^{[RL30172]}

1918–1920: Panama: U.S. forces were used for police duty according to treaty stipulations, at Chiriqui, during election disturbances and subsequent unrest.^{[RL30172]}

1918–1920: Russian SFSR: Marines were landed at and near Vladivostok in June and July to protect the American consulate and other points in the fighting between the Red Army and the Czech Legion which had traversed Siberia from the western front. A joint proclamation of emergency government and neutrality was issued by the American, Japanese, British, French, and Czech commanders in July. In August 7,000 men were landed in Vladivostok and remained until January 1920, as part of an allied occupation force. In September 1918, 5,000 American troops joined the allied intervention force at the city of Arkhangelsk and remained until June 1919. These operations were in response to the Bolshevik revolution in Russia and were partly supported by Czarist or Kerensky elements. ^{[RL30172]} For details, see the American Expeditionary Force Siberia and the American Expeditionary Force North Russia.

1919: Dalmatia (Croatia): U.S. forces were landed at Trau at the request of Italian authorities to police order between the Italians and Serbs.^{[RL30172]}

1919: Turkey: Marines from USS Arizona were landed to guard the U.S. Consulate during the Greek occupation of Constantinople.^{[RL30172]}

1919: Honduras: From September 8 to 12, a landing force was sent ashore to maintain order in a neutral zone during an attempted revolution.^{[RL30172]}

=== 1920s ===
1920: China: On March 14, a landing force was sent ashore for a few hours to protect lives during a disturbance at Jiujiang.^{[RL30172]}

1920: Guatemala: From April 9 to 27, U.S. forces protected the American Legation and other American interests, such as the cable station, during a period of fighting between Unionists and the Government of Guatemala.^{[RL30172]}

1920–1922: Russia (Siberia): From February 16, 1920, to November 19, 1922, a Marine guard was sent to protect the United States radio station and property on Russian Island, Bay of Vladivostok.^{[RL30172]}

1921: Panama and Costa Rica: American naval squadrons demonstrated in April on both sides of the Isthmus to prevent war between the two countries over a boundary dispute.^{[RL30172]}

1922: Turkey: In September and October, a landing force was sent ashore with consent of both Greek and Turkish authorities, to protect American lives and property when the Turkish nationalists entered İzmir (Smyrna).^{[RL30172]}

1922–1923: China: From April 1922 to November 1923, Marines were landed five times to protect Americans during periods of unrest.^{[RL30172]}

1924: Honduras: From February 28 to March 31, and from September 10 to 15, U.S. forces protected American lives and interests during election hostilities.^{[RL30172]}

1924: China: In September, Marines were landed to protect Americans and other foreigners in Shanghai during Chinese factional hostilities.^{[RL30172]}

1925: China: From January 15 to August 29, fighting of Chinese factions accompanied by riots and demonstrations in Shanghai brought the landing of American forces to protect lives and property in the International Settlement.^{[RL30172]}

1925: Honduras: From April 19 to 21, U.S. forces protected foreigners at La Ceiba during a political upheaval.^{[RL30172]}

1925: Panama: From October 12 to 23, strikes and rent riots led to the landing of about 600 American troops to keep order and protect American interests.^{[RL30172]}

1926–1933: Nicaragua: From May 7 to June 5, 1926, and August 27, 1926, to January 3, 1933, the coup d'état of General Emiliano Chamorro Vargas aroused revolutionary activities leading to the landing of American marines to protect the interests of the United States. United States forces came and went intermittently until January 3, 1933.^{[RL30172]}

1926: China: In August and September, the Nationalist attack on Hankou brought the landing of American naval forces to protect American citizens. A small guard was maintained at the consulate general even after September 16, when the rest of the forces were withdrawn. Likewise, when Kuomintang forces captured Jiujiang, naval forces were landed for the protection of foreigners November 4 to 6.^{[RL30172]}

1927: China: In February, fighting at Shanghai caused presence American naval forces and marines to be increased. In March, a naval guard was stationed at American consulate at Nanjing after Nationalist forces captured the city. American and British destroyers later used shell fire to protect Americans and other foreigners. Subsequently, additional forces of Marines and naval forces were stationed in the vicinity of Shanghai and Tianjin.^{[RL30172]}

=== 1930s ===
1932: United States: "Bonus Army" of 17,000 WWI veterans plus 20,000 family cleared from Washington and then Anacostia flats "Hooverville" by 3rd Cavalry and 12th Infantry Regiments under Gen. Douglas MacArthur and Major Dwight D Eisenhower, July 28.

1933: Cuba: During a revolution against President Gerardo Machado naval forces demonstrated but no landing was made.^{[RL30172]}

1934: China: Marines landed at Fuzhou to protect the American Consulate.^{[RL30172]}

1937: China: American forces were landed to protect American interests during the Japanese occupation of Shanghai.^{[RL30172]}

=== 1940–1944 ===
1940: Newfoundland, Bermuda, St. Lucia, – Bahamas, Jamaica, Antigua, Trinidad, and British Guiana: Troops were sent to guard air and naval bases obtained under lease by negotiation with the United Kingdom. These were sometimes called lend-lease bases but were under the destroyers-for-bases deal.^{[RL30172]}

1941: Greenland: Greenland was taken under protection of the United States in April.^{[RL30172]}

1941: Netherlands (Dutch Guiana): In November, the President ordered American troops to occupy Dutch Guiana, but by agreement with the Netherlands government in exile, Brazil cooperated to protect aluminum ore supply from the bauxite mines in Suriname.^{[RL30172]}

1941: Iceland: Iceland was taken under the protection of the United States, with consent of its government replacing British troops, for strategic reasons.^{[RL30172]}

1941: Germany: Sometime in the spring, the President ordered the Navy to patrol ship lanes to Europe. By July, U.S. warships were convoying and by September were attacking German submarines. In November, in response to the October 31, 1941, sinking of USS Reuben James, the Neutrality Act was partly repealed to protect U.S. military aid to Britain. ^{[RL30172]}

1941–1945: World War II: On December 8, 1941, the United States declared war against Japan in response to the attack on Pearl Harbor. On December 11, Nazi Germany and Fascist Italy declared war against the United States.

=== 1945–1949 ===
1945: China: In October 50,000 U.S. Marines were sent to North China to assist Chinese Nationalist authorities in disarming and repatriating the Japanese in China and in controlling ports, railroads, and airfields. This was in addition to approximately 60,000 U.S. forces remaining in China at the end of World War II.^{[RL30172]}

1945–1949: Occupation of part of Germany.

1945–1955: Occupation of part of Austria.

1945–1952: Occupation of Japan.

1944–1946: Temporary reoccupation of the Philippines during World War II and in preparation for previously scheduled independence.

1945–1947: U.S. Marines garrisoned in mainland China to oversee the removal of Japanese forces after World War II.

1945–1949: Post-World War II occupation of South Korea; North Korean insurgency in Republic of Korea

1946: Trieste, (Italy): President Truman ordered the increase of U.S. troops along the zonal occupation line and the reinforcement of air forces in northern Italy after the Yugoslav People's Army shot down an unarmed U.S. Army transport plane flying over Venezia Giulia. Earlier U.S. naval units had been sent to the scene.^{[RL30172]} Later the Free Territory of Trieste, Zone A.

1948: Jerusalem (British Mandate): A Marine consular guard was sent to Jerusalem to protect the U.S. Consul General.^{[RL30172]}

1948: Berlin: Berlin Airlift After the Soviet Union established a land blockade of the U.S., British, and French sectors of Berlin on June 24, 1948, the United States and its allies airlifted supplies to Berlin until after the blockade was lifted in May 1949.^{[RL30172]}

1948–1949: China: Marines were dispatched to Nanjing to protect the American Embassy when the city fell to Communist troops, and to Shanghai to aid in the protection and evacuation of Americans.^{[RL30172]}

=== 1950s ===
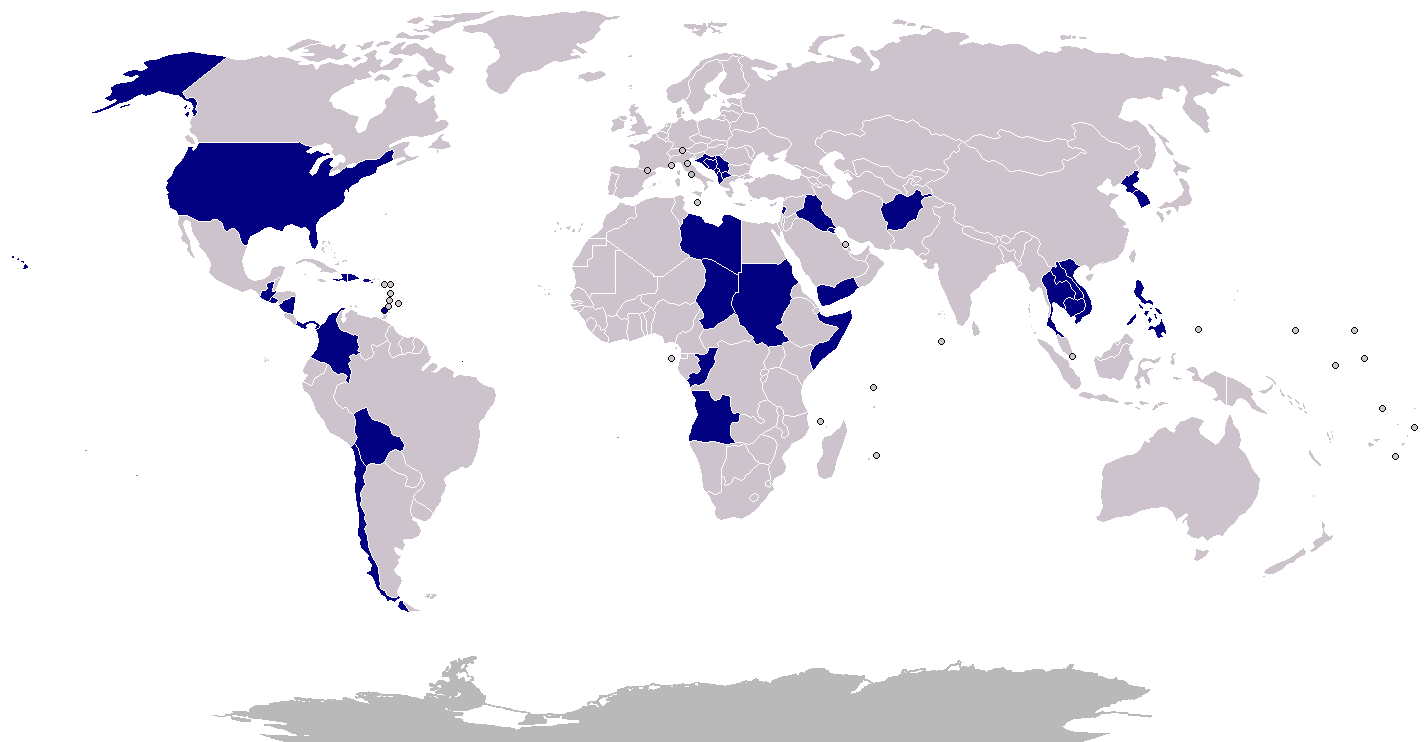
Map of military operations since 1950

1950–1953: Korean War: The United States responded to the North Korean invasion of South Korea by going to its assistance, pursuant to United Nations Security Council resolutions. U.S. forces deployed in Korea exceeded 300,000 during the last year of the active conflict (1953). Over 36,600 U.S. military were killed in action.^{[RL30172]}

1950–1955: Formosa (Taiwan): In June 1950, at the beginning of the Korean War, President Truman ordered the U.S. Seventh Fleet to prevent People's Liberation Army attacks upon Formosa and Republic of China Armed Forces operations against mainland China.^{[RL30172]}

1950: Puerto Rico (United States colonial territory): The United States National Guard used P-47 Thunderbolt attack aircraft, land-based artillery, mortar fire, and grenades to counterattack Puerto Rican freedom fighters, Nationalists and independence rebels looking to end U.S. colonial rule during the Jayuya uprising.

1950: After their defeat in the Chinese Civil War, parts of the Nationalist army retreated south and crossed the border into Burma. The United States supported these Nationalist forces because the United States hoped they would harass the People's Republic of China from the southwest, thereby diverting Chinese resources from the Korean War. The Burmese government protested and international pressure increased. Beginning in 1953, several rounds of withdrawals of the Nationalist forces and their families were carried out. In 1960, joint military action by China and Burma expelled the remaining Nationalist forces from Burma, although some went on to settle in the Burma-Thailand borderlands.

1954–1955: China: First Taiwan Strait Crisis, Naval units evacuated U.S. civilians and military personnel from the Tachen Islands.^{[RL30172]}

1955–1964: Vietnam: First military advisors sent to Vietnam on February 12, 1955. By 1964, U.S. troop levels had grown to 21,000. On August 7, 1964, U.S. Congress approved Gulf of Tonkin resolution affirming "All necessary measures to repel any armed attack against the forces of the United States. . .to prevent further aggression. . . (and) assist any member or protocol state of the Southeast Asian Collective Defense Treaty (SEATO) requesting assistance. . ."^{[Vietnam timeline]}

1956: Egypt: A marine battalion evacuated U.S. nationals and other persons from Alexandria during the Suez Crisis.^{[RL30172]}

1958: Lebanon: 1958 Lebanon crisis, Marines were landed in Lebanon at the invitation of President Camille Chamoun to help protect against threatened insurrection supported from the outside. The President's action was supported by a congressional resolution passed in 1957 that authorized such actions in that area of the world.^{[RL30172]}

1959–1960: The Caribbean: Second Marine Ground Task Force was deployed to protect U.S. nationals following the Cuban Revolution.^{[RL30172]}

1955–1975: Vietnam War: U.S. military advisers had been in South Vietnam for a decade, and their numbers had been increased as the military position of the Saigon government became weaker. After citing what he falsely termed were Vietnam People's Navy attacks on U.S. destroyers, in what came to be known as the Gulf of Tonkin incident, President Lyndon B. Johnson asked in August 1964 for a resolution expressing U.S. determination to support "freedom and protect peace in Southeast Asia." Congress responded with the Gulf of Tonkin Resolution, giving President Johnson authorization, without a formal declaration of war by Congress, for the use of conventional military force in Southeast Asia. Following this resolution, and following a communist attack on a U.S. installation in central Vietnam, the United States escalated its participation in the war to a peak of 543,000 military personnel by April 1969.^{[RL30172]}

=== 1960s ===
1962: Thailand: The Third Marine Expeditionary Unit landed on May 17, 1962, to support that country during the threat of Communist pressure from outside; by July 30, the 5,000 marines had been withdrawn.^{[RL30172]}

1962: Cuba: Cuban Missile Crisis, On October 22, President Kennedy instituted a "quarantine" on the shipment of offensive missiles to Cuba from the Soviet Union. He also warned Soviet Union that the launching of any missile from Cuba against nations in the Western Hemisphere would bring about U.S. nuclear retaliation on the Soviet Union. A negotiated settlement was achieved in a few days.^{[RL30172]}

1962–1975: Laos: From October 1962 until 1975, the United States played an important role in military support of anti-Communist forces in Laos.^{[RL30172]} Meanwhile, the United States was fighting a covert military operation using CIA paramilitary forces, known as The Secret War.

1964: Congo (Zaire): The United States sent four transport planes to provide airlift for Congolese troops during a rebellion and to transport Belgian paratroopers to rescue foreigners.^{[RL30172]}

1965: Invasion of Dominican Republic: Operation Power Pack, The United States intervened to protect lives and property during a Dominican revolt and sent 20,000 U.S. troops as fears grew that the revolutionary forces were coming increasingly under Communist control.^{[RL30172]} A popular rebellion broke out, promising to reinstall Juan Bosch as the country's elected leader. The revolution was crushed when U.S. Marines landed to uphold the military regime by force.

1967: Israel: The USS Liberty incident, whereupon a United States Navy Technical Research Ship was attacked June 8, 1967, by the Israel Defense Forces, killing 34 and wounding more than 170 U.S. crew members.

1967: Congo (Zaire): The United States sent three military transport aircraft with crews to provide the Congo central government with logistical support during a revolt.^{[RL30172]}

1968: Laos & Cambodia: U.S. starts secret bombing campaign against targets along the Ho Chi Minh trail in the sovereign nations of Cambodia and Laos. The bombings last at least two years. (See Operation Commando Hunt)

=== 1970s ===
1970: Cambodian campaign: U.S. troops were ordered into Cambodia to clean out Communist sanctuaries from which Viet Cong and North Vietnam attacked U.S. and South Vietnamese forces in Vietnam. The object of this attack, which lasted from April 30 to June 30, was to ensure the continuing safe withdrawal of American forces from South Vietnam and to assist the program of Vietnamization.^{[RL30172]}

1972: North Vietnam: Christmas bombing Operation Linebacker II (not mentioned in RL30172, but an operation leading to peace negotiations). The operation was conducted from December 18–29, 1972. It was a bombing of the cities Hanoi and Haiphong by B-52 bombers.

1973: Operation Nickel Grass, a strategic airlift operation conducted by the United States to deliver weapons and supplies to Israel during the Yom Kippur War.

1974: Evacuation from Cyprus: United States naval forces evacuated U.S. civilians during the Turkish invasion of Cyprus.^{[RL30172]}

1975: Evacuation from Vietnam: Operation Frequent Wind, On April 3, 1975, President Gerald Ford reported U.S. naval vessels, helicopters, and Marines had been sent to assist in evacuation of refugees and US nationals from Vietnam.^{[RL30172]}

1975: Evacuation from Cambodia: Operation Eagle Pull, On April 12, 1975, President Ford reported that he had ordered U.S. military forces to proceed with the planned evacuation of the U.S. citizens from Cambodia.^{[RL30172]}

1975: South Vietnam: On April 30, 1975, President Ford reported that a force of 70 evacuation helicopters and 865 Marines had evacuated about 1,400 U.S. citizens and 5,500 third country nationals and South Vietnamese from landing zones in and around the U.S. Embassy, Saigon and Tan Son Nhut Airport.^{[RL30172]}

1975: Cambodia: Mayaguez incident, On May 15, 1975, President Ford reported he had ordered military forces to retake SS Mayaguez, a merchant vessel which was seized from Kampuchean Revolutionary Army naval patrol boats in international waters and forced to proceed to a nearby island.^{[RL30172]}

1976: Lebanon: On July 22 and 23, 1976, helicopters from five U.S. naval vessels evacuated approximately 250 Americans and Europeans from Lebanon during fighting between Lebanese factions after an overland convoy evacuation had been blocked by hostilities.^{[RL30172]}

1976: Korea: Additional forces were sent to Korea after two American soldiers were killed by North Korean soldiers in the Korean Demilitarized Zone while cutting down a tree.^{[RL30172]}

1978: Zaire (Congo): From May 19 through June, the United States used military transport aircraft to provide logistical support to Belgian and French rescue operations in Zaïre.^{[RL30172]}

=== 1980s ===
1980: Iran: Operation Eagle Claw, on April 26, 1980, President Carter reported the use of six U.S. transport planes and eight helicopters in an unsuccessful attempt to rescue the American hostages in Iran.

1980: U.S. Army and Air Force units arrive in the Sinai in September as part of "Operation Bright Star". They are there to train with the Egyptian Armed Forces as part of the Camp David peace accords signed in 1979. Elements of the 101st Airborne Division, (1st Battalion, 502nd Infantry) and Air Force MAC (Military Airlift Command) units are in theater for four months & are the first U.S. military forces in the region since World War II.

1981: El Salvador: After a guerrilla offensive against the government of El Salvador, additional U.S. military advisers were sent to El Salvador, bringing the total to approximately 55, to assist in training government forces in counterinsurgency.^{[RL30172]}

1981: Libya: First Gulf of Sidra incident, on August 19, 1981, U.S. planes based on the carrier USS Nimitz shot down two Libyan jets over the Gulf of Sidra after one of the Libyan jets had fired a heat-seeking missile. The United States periodically held freedom of navigation exercises in the Gulf of Sidra, claimed by Libya as territorial waters but considered international waters by the United States.^{[RL30172]}

1982: Sinai: On March 19, 1982, President Reagan reported the deployment of military personnel and equipment to participate in the Multinational Force and Observers in the Sinai Peninsula. Participation had been authorized by the Multinational Force and Observers Resolution, Public Law 97-132.^{[RL30172]}

1982: Lebanon: Multinational Force in Lebanon, on August 21, 1982, President Reagan reported the dispatch of 800 Marines to serve in the multinational force to assist in the withdrawal of members of the Palestine Liberation force from Beirut. The Marines left September 20, 1982.^{[RL30172]}

1982–1983: Lebanon: On September 29, 1982, President Reagan reported the deployment of 1,200 marines to serve in a temporary multinational force to facilitate the restoration of Lebanese government sovereignty. On September 29, 1983, Congress passed the Multinational Force in Lebanon Resolution (P.L. 98-119) authorizing the continued participation for eighteen months.^{[RL30172]}

1983: Egypt: After a Libyan plane bombed a city in Sudan on March 18, 1983, and Sudan and Egypt appealed for assistance, the United States dispatched an AWACS electronic surveillance plane to Egypt.^{[RL30172]}

1983: Grenada: Operation Urgent Fury, citing the increased threat of Soviet and Cuban influence and noting the development of an international airport following a coup d'état and alignment with the Soviet Union and Cuba, the U.S. invades the island nation of Grenada.^{[RL30172]}

1983–1989: Honduras: In July 1983, the United States undertook a series of exercises in Honduras that some believed might lead to conflict with Nicaragua. On March 25, 1986, unarmed U.S. military helicopters and crewmen ferried Honduran troops to the Nicaraguan border to repel Nicaraguan troops.^{[RL30172]}

1983: Chad: On August 8, 1983, President Reagan reported the deployment of two AWACS electronic surveillance planes and eight F-15 fighter planes and ground logistical support forces to assist Chad against Libyan and rebel forces.^{[RL30172]}

1984: Persian Gulf: On June 5, 1984, Saudi Arabian jet fighter planes, aided by intelligence from a U.S. AWACS electronic surveillance aircraft and fueled by a U.S. KC-10 tanker, shot down two Iranian fighter planes over an area of the Persian Gulf proclaimed as a protected zone for shipping.^{[RL30172]}

1985: Italy: On October 10, 1985, U.S. Navy pilots intercepted an Egyptian airliner and forced it to land in Sicily. The airliner was carrying the hijackers of the Italian cruise ship Achille Lauro who had killed an American citizen during the hijacking.^{[RL30172]}

1986: Libya: Action in the Gulf of Sidra (1986), on March 26, 1986, President Reagan reported on March 24 and 25, U.S. forces, while engaged in freedom of navigation exercises around the Gulf of Sidra, had been attacked by Libyan missiles and the United States had responded with missiles.^{[RL30172]}

1986: Libya: Operation El Dorado Canyon, on April 16, 1986, President Reagan reported that U.S. air and naval forces had conducted bombing strikes on terrorist facilities and military installations in the Libyan capitol of Tripoli, claiming that Libyan leader Col. Muammar Gaddafi was responsible for a bomb attack at a German disco that killed two U.S. soldiers.^{[RL30172]}

1987: Persian Gulf: USS Stark was struck on May 17 by two Exocet antiship missiles fired from a Dassault Mirage F1 of the Iraqi Air Force during the Iran–Iraq War, killing 37 U.S. Navy sailors.

1987: Persian Gulf: Operation Nimble Archer. Attacks on two Iranian oil platforms in the Persian Gulf by United States Navy forces on October 19. The attack was a response to Iran's October 16, 1987, attack on the MV Sea Isle City, a reflagged Kuwaiti oil tanker at anchor off Kuwait, with a Silkworm missile.

1987–1988: Persian Gulf: Operation Earnest Will. After the Iran–Iraq War (the Tanker War phase) resulted in several military incidents in the Persian Gulf, the United States increased U.S. joint military forces operations in the Persian Gulf and adopted a policy of reflagging and escorting Kuwaiti oil tankers through the Persian Gulf to protect them from Iraqi and Iranian attacks. President Reagan reported that U.S. ships had been fired upon or struck mines or taken other military action on September 21 (Iran Ajr), October 8, and October 19, 1987, and April 18 (Operation Praying Mantis), July 3, and July 14, 1988. The United States gradually reduced its forces after a cease-fire between Iran and Iraq on August 20, 1988.^{[RL30172]} It was the largest naval convoy operation since World War II.

1987–1988: Persian Gulf: Operation Prime Chance was a United States Special Operations Command operation intended to protect U.S.-flagged oil tankers from Iranian attack during the Iran–Iraq War. The operation took place roughly at the same time as Operation Earnest Will.

1988: Persian Gulf: Operation Praying Mantis was the April 18, 1988, action waged by U.S. naval forces in retaliation for the Iranian mining of the Persian Gulf and the subsequent damage to an American warship.

1988: Honduras: Operation Golden Pheasant was an emergency deployment of U.S. troops to Honduras in 1988, as a result of threatening actions by the forces of the (then socialist) Nicaraguans.

1988: USS Vincennes shoot-down of Iran Air Flight 655.

1988: Panama: In mid-March and April 1988, during a period of instability in Panama and as the United States increased pressure on Panamanian head of state General Manuel Noriega to resign, the United States sent 1,000 troops to Panama, to "further safeguard the canal, U.S. lives, property and interests in the area." The forces supplemented 10,000 U.S. military personnel already in the Panama Canal Zone.^{[RL30172]}

1989: Libya: Second Gulf of Sidra incident. On January 4, 1989, two U.S. Navy F-14 aircraft based on USS John F. Kennedy shot down two Libyan jet fighters over the Mediterranean Sea about 70 miles north of Libya. The U.S. pilots said the Libyan planes had demonstrated hostile intentions.^{[RL30172]}

1989: Panama: On May 11, 1989, in response to General Noriega's disregard of the results of the Panamanian election, President Bush ordered a brigade-sized force of approximately 1,900 troops to augment the estimated 1,000 U.S. forces already in the area.^{[RL30172]}

1989: Colombia, Bolivia, and Peru: Andean Initiative in war on drugs, On September 15, 1989, President Bush announced that military and law enforcement assistance would be sent to help the Andean nations of Colombia, Bolivia, and Peru combat illicit drug producers and traffickers. By mid-September there were 50–100 U.S. military advisers in Colombia in connection with transport and training in the use of military equipment, plus seven Special Forces teams of 2–12 persons to train troops in the three countries.^{[RL30172]}

1989: Philippines: Operation Classic Resolve, On December 2, 1989, President Bush reported that on December 1, Air Force fighters from Clark Air Base in Luzon had assisted the Aquino government to repel a coup attempt. In addition, 100 marines were sent from U.S. Naval Base Subic Bay to protect the United States Embassy in Manila.^{[RL30172]}

1989–1990: Panama: United States invasion of Panama and Operation Just Cause, On December 21, 1989, President Bush reported that he had ordered U.S. military forces to Panama to protect the lives of American citizens and bring General Noriega to justice. By February 13, 1990, all the invasion forces had been withdrawn.^{[RL30172]} Around 200 Panamanian civilians were reported killed. The Panamanian head of state, General Manuel Noriega, was captured and brought to the U.S.

=== 1990s ===
1990: Liberia: On August 6, 1990, President Bush reported that a reinforced rifle company had been sent to provide additional security to the U.S. Embassy in Monrovia, and that helicopter teams had evacuated U.S. citizens from Liberia.^{[RL30172]}

1990: Saudi Arabia: On August 9, 1990, President Bush reported that he launched Operation Desert Shield by ordering the forward deployment of substantial elements of the U.S. armed forces into the Persian Gulf region to help defend Saudi Arabia after the August 2 invasion of Kuwait by Iraq. On November 16, 1990, he reported the continued buildup of the forces to ensure an adequate offensive military option.^{[RL30172]}American hostages being held in Iran.^{[RL30172]}

1991: Iraq: Operation Desert Storm, The Allied air to land offensive from January 17, 1991, to April 11, 1991

1991: Iraq: Operation Desert Sabre, The Allied ground offensive from Feb 24 to 27, 1991

1991–1996: Iraq: Operation Provide Comfort, Delivery of humanitarian relief and military protection for Kurds fleeing their homes in northern Iraq during the 1991 uprising, by a small Allied ground force based in Turkey which began in April 1991.

1991: Iraq: On May 17, 1991, President Bush stated that the Iraqi repression of the Kurdish people had necessitated a limited introduction of U.S. forces into northern Iraq for emergency relief purposes.^{[RL30172]}

1991: Zaire: On September 25–27, 1991, after widespread looting and rioting broke out in Kinshasa, Air Force C-141s transported 100 Belgian troops and equipment into Kinshasa. American planes also carried 300 French troops into the Central African Republic and hauled evacuated American citizens.^{[RL30172]}

1992: Sierra Leone: Operation Silver Anvil, Following the April 29 coup that overthrew President Joseph Saidu Momoh, a United States European Command (USEUCOM) Joint Special Operations Task Force evacuated 438 people (including 42 Third Country nationals) on May 3. Two Air Mobility Command (AMC) C-141s flew 136 people from Freetown, Sierra Leone, to the Rhein-Main Air Base in Germany and nine C-130 sorties carried another 302 people to Dakar, Senegal.^{[RL30172]}

1992–1996: Bosnia and Herzegovina: Operation Provide Promise was a humanitarian relief operation in Bosnia and Herzegovina during the Yugoslav Wars, from July 2, 1992, to January 9, 1996, which made it the longest running humanitarian airlift in history.

1992: Kuwait: On August 3, 1992, the United States began a series of military exercises in Kuwait, following Iraqi refusal to recognize a new border drawn up by the United Nations and refusal to cooperate with UN inspection teams.^{[RL30172]}

1992–2003: Iraq: Iraqi no-fly zones conflict, The U.S., United Kingdom, and its Gulf War allies declared and enforced "no-fly zones" over the majority of sovereign Iraqi airspace, prohibiting Iraqi flights in zones in southern Iraq and northern Iraq, conducting aerial reconnaissance, and several specific attacks on Iraqi air-defense systems as part of the UN mandate. Often, Iraqi forces continued throughout a decade by firing on U.S. and British aircraft patrolling no-fly zones.(See also Operation Northern Watch, Operation Southern Watch) ^{[RL30172]}

1993–1995: Bosnia: Operation Deny Flight, On April 12, 1993, in response to a United Nations Security Council passage of Resolution 816, U.S. and NATO enforced the no-fly zone over the Bosnian airspace, prohibited all unauthorized flights and allowed to "take all necessary measures to ensure compliance with [the no-fly zone restrictions]."

1993: Somalia: Battle of Mogadishu, or the First Battle of Mogadishu, the outcome of Operation Gothic Serpent. October 3–4, 1993, Task Force Ranger, made up largely of the 75th Ranger Regiment and Delta Force entered hostile urban area Mogadishu to seize two high ranking Somali National Army leaders. Two American UH-60 Black Hawks are shot down, 18 Americans are killed in action, with another 73 wounded, and 1 captured. The events of the battle were gathered in the book Black Hawk Down, which was later adapted to a movie of the same name.

1993: Macedonia: On July 9, 1993, President Clinton reported the deployment of 350 U.S. soldiers to the Republic of Macedonia to participate in the UN Protection Force to help maintain stability in the area of former Yugoslavia.^{[RL30172]}

1994: Bosnia: Banja Luka incident, NATO become involved in the first combat situation when NATO U.S. Air Force F-16 jets shot down four of the six Bosnian Serb J-21 Jastreb single-seat light attack jets for violating UN-mandated no-fly zone.

1994–1995: Haiti: Operation Uphold Democracy, U.S. ships had begun embargo against Haiti. Up to 20,000 U.S. military troops were later deployed to Haiti to restore democratically elected Haiti President Jean-Bertrand Aristide from a military regime which came into power in 1991 after a major coup.^{[RL30172]}

1994: Macedonia: On April 19, 1994, President Clinton reported that the U.S. contingent in Macedonia had been increased by a reinforced company of 200 personnel.^{[RL30172]}

1994: Kuwait: Operation Vigilant Warrior began in October 1994 when Iraqi Republican Guard Divisions began repositioning within Iraq south near the Kuwaiti border. U.S. forces countered with a movement of forces to the Gulf - the largest since Operation Desert Shield. The operation as officially terminated on December 22, 1994. Also see

1995: Bosnia: Operation Deliberate Force, On August 30, 1995, U.S. and NATO aircraft began a major bombing campaign of Bosnian Serb Army in response to a Bosnian Serb mortar attack on a Sarajevo market that killed 37 people on August 28, 1995. This operation lasted until September 20, 1995. The air campaign along with a combined allied ground force of Muslim and Croatian Army against Serb positions led to a Dayton Agreement in December 1995 with the signing of warring factions of the war. As part of Operation Joint Endeavor, U.S. and NATO dispatched the Implementation Force (IFOR) peacekeepers to Bosnia to uphold the Dayton agreement.^{[RL30172]}

1996: Central African Republic, Operation Quick Response: On May 23, 1996, President Clinton reported the deployment of U.S. military personnel to Bangui, Central African Republic, to conduct the evacuation from that country of "private U.S. citizens and certain U.S. government employees", and to provide "enhanced security for the American Embassy in Bangui."^{[RL30172]} United States Marine Corps elements of Joint Task Force Assured Response, responding in nearby Liberia, provided security to the embassy and evacuated 448 people, including between 190 and 208 Americans. The last Marines left Bangui on June 22.

1996: Kuwait: Operation Desert Strike, American Air Strikes in the north to protect the Kurdish population against the Iraqi Army attacks.

1996: Bosnia: Operation Joint Guard, On December 21, 1996, U.S. and NATO established the SFOR peacekeepers to replace the IFOR in enforcing the peace under the Dayton agreement.

1997: Albania: Operation Silver Wake, On March 13, 1997, U.S. military forces were used to evacuate certain U.S. government employees and private U.S. citizens from Tirana, Albania.^{[RL30172]}

1997: Congo and Gabon: On March 27, 1997, President Clinton reported on March 25, 1997, a standby evacuation force of U.S. military personnel had been deployed to Congo and Gabon to provide enhanced security and to be available for any necessary evacuation operation.^{[RL30172]}

1997: Sierra Leone: On May 29 and 30, 1997, U.S. military personnel were deployed to Freetown, Sierra Leone, to prepare for and undertake the evacuation of certain U.S. government employees and private U.S. citizens.^{[RL30172]}

1997: Cambodia: On July 11, 1997, In an effort to ensure the security of American citizens in Cambodia during a period of domestic conflict there, a Task Force of about 550 U.S. military personnel were deployed at Utapao Air Base in Thailand for possible evacuations.^{[RL30172]}

1998: Iraq: Operation Desert Fox, U.S. and British forces conduct a major four-day bombing campaign from December 16–19, 1998 on Iraqi targets.^{[RL30172]}

1998–1999: Kenya and Tanzania: U.S. military personnel were deployed to Nairobi, Kenya, to coordinate the medical and disaster assistance related to the bombing of the U.S. Embassies in Kenya and Tanzania.^{[RL30172]}

1998: Afghanistan and Sudan: Operation Infinite Reach. On August 20, President Clinton ordered a cruise missile attack against two suspected terrorist training camps in Afghanistan and a suspected chemical factory in Sudan.^{[RL30172]}

1998: Liberia: On September 27, 1998, America deployed a stand-by response and evacuation force of 30 U.S. military personnel to increase the security force at the U.S. Embassy in Monrovia. ^{[RL30172]}

1999–2001: East Timor: Limited number of U.S. military forces deployed with the United Nations-mandated International Force for East Timor restore peace to East Timor.^{[RL30172]}

1999: Serbia: Operation Allied Force: U.S. and NATO aircraft began a major bombing of Serbia and Serb positions in Kosovo on March 24, 1999, during the Kosovo War due to the refusal by Serbian President Slobodan Milošević to end repression against ethnic Albanians in Kosovo. This operation ended on June 10, 1999, when Milošević agreed to pull his troops out of Kosovo. In response to the situation in Kosovo, NATO dispatched the KFOR peacekeepers to secure the peace under UNSC Resolution 1244.^{[RL30172]}

=== 2000s ===
2000: Sierra Leone: On May 12, 2000, a U.S. Navy patrol craft deployed to Sierra Leone to support evacuation operations from that country if needed.^{[RL30172]}

2000: Nigeria: Special Forces troops are sent to Nigeria to lead a training mission in the country.

2000: Yemen: On October 12, 2000, after USS Cole attack in the port of Aden, Yemen, military personnel were deployed to Aden.^{[RL30172]}

2000: East Timor: On February 25, 2000, a small number of U.S. military personnel were deployed to support the United Nations Transitional Administration in East Timor (UNTAET).^{[RL30172]}

2001: On April 1, 2001, a mid-air collision between a United States Navy EP-3E ARIES II signals surveillance aircraft and a People's Liberation Army Navy (PLAN) J-8II interceptor fighter jet resulted in an international dispute between the United States and the People's Republic of China called the Hainan Island incident.

2001–2021: War in Afghanistan: The war on terror begins with Operation Enduring Freedom. On October 7, 2001, U.S. Armed Forces invade Afghanistan in response to the 9/11 attacks and "begin combat action in Afghanistan against Al Qaeda and their Taliban supporters."^{[RL30172]}

2002: Yemen: On November 3, 2002, an American MQ-1 Predator fired a Hellfire missile at a car in Yemen killing Qaed Salim Sinan al-Harethi, an al-Qaeda leader thought to be responsible for USS Cole bombing.^{[RL30172]}

2002: Philippines: OEF-Philippines, As of January, U.S. "combat-equipped and combat support forces" have been deployed to the Philippines to train with, assist and advise the Philippine Armed Forces in enhancing their "counterterrorist capabilities."^{[RL30172]}

2002: Côte d'Ivoire: On September 25, 2002, in response to a rebellion in Côte d'Ivoire, U.S. military personnel went into Côte d'Ivoire to assist in the evacuation of American citizens from Bouaké.^{[RL30172]}

2003–2011: War in Iraq: Operation Iraqi Freedom, March 20, 2003, The United States leads a coalition that includes the United Kingdom, Australia and Poland to invade Iraq with the stated goal being "to disarm Iraq in pursuit of peace, stability, and security both in the Gulf region and in the United States."^{[RL30172]}

2003: Liberia: Second Liberian Civil War, On June 9, 2003, President Bush reported that on June 8 he had sent about 35 U.S. Marines into Monrovia, Liberia, to help secure the U.S. Embassy in Nouakchott, Mauritania, and to aid in any necessary evacuation from either Liberia or Mauritania.^{[RL30172]}

2003: Georgia and Djibouti: "US combat equipped and support forces" had been deployed to Georgia and Djibouti to help in enhancing their "counterterrorist capabilities."

2004: Haiti: 2004 Haitian coup d'état occurs, The U.S. first sent 55 combat equipped military personnel to augment the U.S. Embassy security forces there and to protect American citizens and property in light. Later 200 additional U.S. combat-equipped, military personnel were sent to prepare the way for a UN Multinational Interim Force, MINUSTAH.^{[RL30172]}

2004: War on terror: U.S. anti-terror related activities were underway in Georgia, Djibouti, Kenya, Ethiopia, Yemen, and Eritrea.

2004–present: The U.S. deploys drone strikes to aid in the War in North-West Pakistan.

2005–2006: Pakistan: President Bush deploys troops from U.S. Army air cavalry brigades to provide humanitarian relief to far remote villages in the Kashmir mountain ranges of Pakistan stricken by a massive earthquake.

2005–2008: Operation WILLING SPIRIT, Colombia - the rescue of American hostages held hostage by the FARC.

- 2006: Lebanon: part of the 24th Marine Expeditionary Unit begins evacuation of U.S. citizens willing to leave the country in the face of a likely ground invasion by Israel and continued fighting between Hezbollah and the Israeli military.
- 2007: Dai Hong Dan incident, on October 29, 2007, Somali Pirates boarded and attacked a North Korean merchant vessel. Passing U.S. Navy Ships and a helicopter that were patrolling at the time responded to the attack. Once the ship was freed from the pirates, the American forces were given permission to board and assist the wounded crew and handle surviving pirates.
- 2007: Somalia: Battle of Ras Kamboni, on January 8, 2007, while the conflict between the Islamic Courts Union and the Transitional Federal Government continues, an AC-130 gunship conducts an aerial strike on a suspected al-Qaeda operative, along with other Islamist fighters, on Badmadow Island near Ras Kamboni in southern Somalia.

=== 2010s ===
- 2010–present: al-Qaeda insurgency in Yemen: The U.S. has been launching a series of drone strikes on suspected al-Qaeda, al-Shabaab, and ISIS positions in Yemen.
- 2010–2011: Operation New Dawn, on February 17, 2010, U.S. Secretary of Defense Robert Gates announced that as of September 1, 2010, the name "Operation Iraqi Freedom" would be replaced by "Operation New Dawn". This coincides with the reduction of American troops to 50,000.
- 2011: 2011 military intervention in Libya: Operation Odyssey Dawn, United States and coalition enforcing U.N. Security Council Resolution 1973 with bombings of Libyan forces.
- 2011: Osama Bin Laden is killed by U.S. military forces in Abbottabad, Pakistan as part of Operation Neptune Spear.
- 2011: Drone strikes on al-Shabaab militants begin in Somalia. This marks the 6th nation in which such strikes have been carried out, including Afghanistan, Pakistan, Iraq, Yemen and Libya.
- 2011–present: Uganda: U.S. Combat troops sent in as advisers to Uganda.
- 2012: Jordan: 150 U.S. troops deployed to Jordan to help it contain the Syrian civil war within Syria's borders.
- 2012: Turkey: 400 troops and two batteries of Patriot missiles sent to Turkey to prevent any missile strikes from Syria.
- 2012: Chad: 50 U.S. troops have deployed to the African country of Chad to help evacuate U.S. citizens and embassy personnel from the neighboring Central African Republic's capital of Bangui in the face of rebel advances toward the city.
- 2013: Mali: U.S. forces assisted the French in Operation Serval with air refueling and transport aircraft.
- 2013: Somalia: U.S. Air Force planes supported the French in the Bulo Marer hostage rescue attempt. However, they did not use any weapons.
- 2013: 2013 Korean crisis
- 2013: Navy SEALs conducted a raid in Somalia and possibly killed a senior Al-Shabaab official, simultaneously another raid took place in Tripoli, Libya, where Special Operations Forces captured Abu Anas al Libi (also known as Anas al-Libi)
- 2014–2017: Uganda: V-22 Ospreys, MC-130s, KC-135s and additional U.S. soldiers are sent to Uganda to continue to help African forces search for Joseph Kony.
- 2014: American raid in Libya: U.S. Special forces along with Federal Bureau of Investigation agents capture Ahmed Abu Khattala for his leading role in the 2012 Benghazi attack.
- 2014–2021: American intervention in Iraq: Hundreds of U.S. troops deployed to protect American assets in Iraq and to advise Iraqi and Kurdish fighters. In August the U.S. Air Force conducted a humanitarian air drop and the U.S. Navy began a series of airstrikes against Islamic State-aligned forces throughout northern Iraq.
- 2014: 2014 American rescue mission in Syria: The U.S. attempted to rescue James Foley and other hostages being held by ISIL. Air strikes were conducted on the ISIL military base known as "Osama bin Laden camp". Meanwhile, the bombings, Delta teams parachuted near an ISIL high-valued prison. The main roads were blocked to keep any target from escaping. When no hostage was found, the American troops began house to house searches. By this time, ISIL militants began arriving to the area. Heavy fighting occurred until the Americans decided to abandon the mission due to the hostages being nowhere in the area. Although the mission failed, at least 5 ISIL militants were killed, however 1 American troop was wounded. According to the reports, Jordan had a role in the operation and that one Jordanian soldier had been wounded as well. This was unconfirmed.
- 2014–present: American-led intervention in Syria: American aircraft bomb Islamic State positions in Syria. Airstrikes on al-Qaeda, al-Nusra Front and Khorasan positions are also being conducted.
- 2014–present: Intervention against the Islamic State of Iraq and the Levant: Syrian locals forces and American-led coalition forces launch a series of aerial attacks on ISIL and al-Nusra Front positions in Iraq and Syria.
- 2014: 2014 hostage rescue operations in Yemen: On November 25, U.S. Navy SEALs and Yemeni Special Forces launched an operations in Yemen in attempt to rescue eight hostages that were being held by al-Qaeda. Although the operation was successful, no American hostages were secured. In the first attempt, six Yemenis, one Saudi Arabian, and one Ethiopian were rescued. On December 4, 2014, al-Qaeda in the Arabian Peninsula (AQAP) threatened to execute the Somers if the U.S. failed to the unspecified commands. AQAP also stated that they would be executed if the U.S. attempted another rescue operation. On December 6, a second operation was launched. 40 U.S. SEALs and 30 Yemeni troops were deployed to the compound. A 10-minute fire fight occurred before the American troops could enter where the remaining hostages (Somers and Korkie) were being held. They were alive, but fatally wounded. Surgery was done in mid air when flying away from the site. Korkie died while in flight, and Somers died once landed on USS Makin Island. No American troop was killed/injured, however a Yemenis soldier was wounded.
- 2015: April 30, 2015, U.S. sends ships to the Strait of Hormuz to shield vessels after Iranian seizure of a commercial vessel, MV Maersk Tigris. Iran fired shots over the bow, and seized the ship registered in the Marshall Islands, as part of a decade-long legal dispute between Iran and Maersk.
- 2015–present: In early October 2015, the U.S. military deployed 300 troops to Cameroon, with the approval of the Cameroonian government; their primary mission was to provide intelligence support to local forces as well as conducting reconnaissance flights.
- 2017: 2017 Shayrat missile strike: Tomahawk missiles launched from U.S. naval vessels in the Mediterranean hit a Syrian airbase in Homs Governorate in response to a chemical weapons attack against civilians south-west of Idlib. Seven were killed and nine wounded.
- 2018: missile strikes were launched by the U.S. and allies on military targets in Damascus and near Homs in response to the Douma chemical attack against civilians in April 2018.
- 2019: Operation Sentinel: U.S. Central Command was developing a multinational maritime effort to increase surveillance of and security in key waterways in the Middle East to ensure freedom of navigation.

=== 2020s ===
- 2020: Response to attack on the U.S. embassy in Baghdad. The U.S. embassy in Baghdad came under siege on December 31, 2019, following U.S. retaliation for an attack by the pro-Iranian Kata'ib Hezbollah in which four service members were wounded and one civilian contractor was killed. In response, Marines and aircraft were immediately dispatched from Kuwait for defense of the embassy and overwatch. On January 2, 2020, the U.S. launched an airstrike on a convoy, killing Iranian Quds Force Major-General Qasem Soleimani and Iraqi militia leader Abu Mahdi al-Muhandis. An additional 4,000 U.S. troops were mobilized to the region, including some 750 from the 82nd Airborne Division. In an annual report released by the Pentagon on May 6, 2020, it cited that approximately 132 civilians have been killed in 2019 as part of US military operations in Iraq, Afghanistan, Somalia and Syria. The Department of Defense (DoD) added that no civilian casualties were reported under the US military operations in Libya and Yemen civil wars respectively.
- 2021: February 2021 United States airstrike in Syria: On February 25, 2021, the United States military carried out an airstrike on a site believed to have been occupied by Iranian-backed Iraqi militias operating from across the border in eastern Syria in response to recent attacks against US and coalition forces in Iraq.
- 2021: June 27, 2021, the U.S. military conducted airstrikes on Iranian-backed militias on both sides of the Iraq–Syria border in response to drone attacks on U.S. forces and facilities in the region.
- 2021: American military intervention in Somalia (2007–present): July 20, 2021, U.S. military airstrikes were conducted on al-Shabab militants in Somalia, the first of its kind since US troops withdrew and President Joe Biden took office in January 2021. On July 22, 2021, further airstrikes were conducted by the U.S. Air Force against al-Shabab militants.
- 2021: 2021 Kabul airlift: as part of an ongoing, multi-national effort by NATO partner countries to extract citizens and Afghan partners from the country following the 2021 fall of Kabul to the Taliban. The U.S. deployed 6,000 troops to seize control of Hamid Karzai International Airport to serve as a base of operations for the evacuation effort. The DOD confirmed on August 16 that General Kenneth F. McKenzie Jr., Commander, United States Central Command, had met Taliban leaders in Qatar to secure an agreement. The Taliban reportedly agreed to allow American evacuation flights at Kabul Airport to proceed without hindrance. International airlifts of evacuees had resumed by August 17 following a temporary halt to clear the runway of civilians as the DOD confirmed the airport was open for all military flights and limited commercial flights. Pentagon officials added that evacuation efforts were expected to speed up and were scheduled to continue until August 31. On the evening of August 22, Lloyd Austin, United States Secretary of Defense, ordered the activation of the American Civil Reserve Air Fleet to aid in the evacuations, only the third time in history that the fleet had been activated. On August 26, 2021, two suicide attacks occurred outside the gates of the Kabul airport, killing at least 170 people including 13 U.S. military personnel (11 Marines, one soldier, and one Navy corpsman), along with over 150 wounded. On August 27, 2021, U.S. military forces conducted a drone strike in Nangarhar Province, Afghanistan on a presumed "planner" for the ISIS-K militant organization in response to the Kabul airport attack that occurred on August 26, 2021. On September 6, 2021, the United States evacuated four American citizens (specifically, an Amarillo, Texas woman and her three children) from Afghanistan via an overland route, marking the first overland evacuation facilitated by the US Department of State since the military withdrawal. The Taliban was aware of the evacuation and did not make any effort to stop it. On September 17, 2021, the U.S. CENTCOM commander, General Frank MacKenzie, announced that an investigation by the U.S. military of the aforementioned drone strike found that it killed 10 civilians (including 7 children and a U.S. aid worker), and that the vehicle targeted was likely not a threat associated with ISIS-K. In December 2021, in response to the errant August strike, the Pentagon stated that no U.S. military personnel involved would be disciplined. As of November 2021, the U.S. State Department believes as many as 14,000 U.S. legal permanent residents remain in Afghanistan.
- 2021: On October 22, 2021, a U.S. airstrike in northwestern Syria killed senior al-Qaeda leader Abdul Hamid al-Matar as part of ongoing anti-terrorism operations in the region.
- 2022: On July 31, 2022 al-Qaeda leader Ayman al-Zawahiri was killed in Afghanistan in an American drone strike
- 2023: Operation Prosperity Guardian: On 18 December 2023 United States Secretary of Defense Lloyd Austin announced the formation of an international maritime security force under “Operation Prosperity Guardian,” which aims to counter threats by Houthi forces against international maritime commerce following weeks of attacks against commercial vessels.
- 2024: Operation Poseidon Archer: Between 12 January 2024 and 6 May 2025 the United States and the United Kingdom, with support from Australia, Bahrain, Canada, Denmark, the Netherlands, and New Zealand, launched a series of cruise missile and airstrikes against the Houthi movement in Yemen in response to Houthi attacks on ships in the Red Sea. The Houthis had previously declared that their attacks were in support of Palestinians during the Gaza war; Houthi attacks on shipping were condemned by the United Nations Security Council the day before the initial strike.
- 2025: Operation Rough Rider: In March 2025, the United States launched a large campaign of air and naval strikes against Houthi targets in Yemen. Codenamed Operation Rough Rider, it has been the largest U.S. military operation in the Middle East of President Donald Trump's second term. The strikes began on March 15, targeting radar systems, air defenses, and ballistic and drone launch sites used by the Houthis to attack commercial ships and naval vessels in the Red Sea and Gulf of Aden.
- 2025: Operation Midnight Hammer: On June 22, 2025, the United States Air Force and Navy attacked three nuclear facilities in Iran as part of the Iran–Israel war, under the code name Operation Midnight Hammer. Seven B-2 strategic bombers struck multiple Iranian nuclear facilities. This was the only US offensive action during the Iran-Israel War.
- 2025: Operation Southern Spear: A United States military and surveillance campaign aimed at "detecting, disrupting, and degrading transnational criminal and illicit maritime networks".
- 2025: Operation Hawkeye Strike: A retaliatory military action by the United States against the Islamic State, following the December 2025 Palmyra attack.
- 2026: Operation Absolute Resolve: On 3 January 2026, the United States launched airstrikes on multiple locations across northern Venezuela, including the capital city of Caracas. President Nicolás Maduro and his wife were captured by U.S. forces and removed from the country.
- 2026: Operation Epic Fury: On 28 February 2026, the United States and Israel launched a large-scale joint military operation against Iran, codenamed Operation Epic Fury. The strikes targeted military infrastructure throughout Iran, with Tehran, Isfahan, Tabriz and other cities being struck. Iran's supreme leader Ali Khamenei was killed in the strikes.
- 2026: Operation Project Freedom: On 4 May 2026, the United States launched an operation to escort merchant ships out of the Persian Gulf and save 23,000 civilians from 87 countries stranded in the Gulf. It has been declared the second stage of the Iran war, following the end of Operation Epic Fury.

== Relocation ==
- Indian removal (1830s)
  - Trail of Tears (1835–1838)
- World War II-Era German-American internment (1942–1945)
- World War II-Era Italian-American internment (1942–43)
- World War II-Era Japanese-American internment (1942–1946)

== Armed insurrections and slave revolts ==
See also: Slave rebellion, Tax revolt

- Gloucester County, Virginia Slave Rebellion (1663)
- Bacon's Rebellion (1676)
- Leisler's Rebellion (1689–1691)
- Stono Rebellion (1739)
- Pontiac's Rebellion (1763–1766)
- War of the Regulation (1764–1771)
- Boston Tea Party (1773)
- American Revolutionary War (1775–1783)
- Shays' Rebellion (1786)
- Whiskey Rebellion (1794)
- John Fries' Rebellion (1799–1800)
- Louisiana Territory Slave Rebellion (1811)
- Nat Turner's slave rebellion (1831)
- Buckshot War (1837–38)
- Patriot War (1837–38)
- Anti-Rent War (1839–1844)
- Dorr Rebellion (1841–42)
- Taos Revolt (1847)
- Utah War (1857–58)
- John Brown's Raid on Federal Armory at Harper's Ferry (1859)
- American Civil War (1861–1865)
- Green Corn Rebellion Oklahoma (1917)
- Battle of Blair Mountain West Virginia (1921)
- The Bonus March (1932)
- Wounded Knee incident – Wounded Knee, South Dakota (1973)

== Range wars ==
- Franklin County War (Idaho, 1866–1872)
- Mason County War (Texas, 1874–1877)
- Colfax County War (New Mexico, 1875)
- Lincoln County War (New Mexico, 1877–78)
- San Elizario Salt War (Texas-Mexico borderlands 1877)
- Johnson County War (Wyoming, 1892)
- Pleasant Valley War (Arizona, 1886)
- Sheep Wars (Texas-New Mexico borderlands, 1879–1900)
- Posey War (Utah, 1923)

== Bloody local feuds ==
- Rowan County War (Kentucky, 1884–1887)
- Hatfield–McCoy feud (West Virginia-Kentucky, 1878–1891)

== Bloodless boundary disputes ==
- Toledo War (1835, Michigan Territory-Ohio)
- Aroostook War (1838–39, U.S.-Britain)
- Honey War (1839, Iowa Territory-Missouri)
- Oregon boundary dispute (1844–1846, U.S.-Britain)
- Pig War (1859, U.S.-Britain)
- Chamizal dispute (1895–1963, U.S.-Mexico)
- Alaska boundary dispute (1907, U.S.-Canada)
- Red River Bridge War (1932, Oklahoma-Texas)

== Terrorist, paramilitary groups and guerrilla warfare ==
=== 18th and 19th century ===
- Francis Marion (1780–1782)
- Benjamin Forsyth (1812–1814)
- Bleeding Kansas (1854–1860)
  - Wakarusa War (1855)
  - John Brown (1856–1859)
- Utah War (1857–1858)
- Cortina Troubles (1859–1861)
- Quantrill's Raiders (1861–1863)
  - Bloody Bill Anderson (1840–1864)
  - Centralia Massacre (1864)
- Red Shirts Hamburg massacre (1876)
- Ku Klux Klan (1877)
- Knights of the White Camelia
- White League (1874)
  - Coushatta massacre (1874)
  - Colfax riot (1874)
- Symbionese Liberation Army (1973–1975)

== Labor–management disputes ==
- Great Railroad Strike of 1877
- Homestead Strike (1892)
- Pullman Strike (1894)
- Coeur d'Alene, Idaho labor confrontation of 1899
- Black Patch Tobacco Wars (1904–1911)
- Aftermath of the Ludlow massacre (1914)
- Battle of Blair Mountain (1921)

== State and national secession attempts ==
- Westsylvania (1776)
- Green Mountain Boys (1777–1791) (Vermont voluntarily entered the Union in 1791)
- State of Franklin (1784–1790)
- Republic of West Florida (1810)
- Republic of Indian Stream (1832–1842)
- Confederate States of America (1861–1865)

== Riots and public disorder ==
- 1863 New York City draft riots
- Memphis riots of 1866
- Rock Springs massacre of 1885
- Seattle riot of 1886
- Lawlessness after the 1906 San Francisco earthquake
- 1919 Red Summer era
  - Washington race riot of 1919
  - Omaha race riot of 1919
  - Elaine massacre
- 1920 Lexington riots
- Revere Beach riot of 1920
- Zoot Suit riots
- 1943 Detroit race riot
- Battle of Alcatraz
- Ole Miss riot of 1962
- Birmingham riot of 1963
- 1967 Detroit riot
- 1968 King assassination riots in Washington, D.C., Chicago, and Baltimore
- 1989 riots in the aftermath of Hurricane Hugo
- 1992 Los Angeles riots
- 2005 civil disturbances after Hurricane Katrina
- 2020–2023 United States racial unrest
  - George Floyd protests
- 2021 Storming of the United States Capitol
- 2025 June 2025 Los Angeles protests

== Miscellaneous ==
- Pennamite–Yankee War (1769–1784)
- Oconee War (1784)
- Burr conspiracy (1804–1807)
- Chesapeake–Leopard affair (1807)
- Little Belt affair (1811)
- Railroad Wars (1853–1855)
- Sinking of the General Sherman (1866)
- Fenian raids (1866)
- Brooks–Baxter War (1873)
- Virginius affair (1873)
- Canal Zone Riots (1964)
- Kent State shootings (1970)
- War on drugs (~1972–)
- Iran hostage crisis (1979–1981)
- Iraqi attack on USS Stark (1987)
- Waco siege (1993)
- Bundy standoff (2014)
- Occupation of the Malheur National Wildlife Refuge (2016)

=== Latter-day Saints ===
- 1838 Mormon War
- Utah War (1857–58)

=== Republic of Texas ===
- Texas Revolution (1835–36)
- Texan Santa Fe Expedition (1841)

== See also ==
- List of notable deployments of U.S. military forces overseas
- List of wars involving the United States
- American imperialism
- Awards and decorations of the United States military
- Declaration of war by the United States
- Foreign policy of the United States
- History of the Central Intelligence Agency
- List of the lengths of United States participation in wars
- Military history of the United States
- Military operations other than war (US)
- Monroe Doctrine
- Foreign interventions by the United States
- Relative costs of American wars
- Territorial evolution of the United States
- Timeline of the war on terror
- United States Armed Forces
- United States Department of Defense
- United States military casualties of war
- United States war crimes
