= Security and Human Rights =

- Language: English

Publication details
- Former name: Helsinki Monitor
- History: 1990–present
- Publisher: Brill Publishers
- Frequency: Quarterly

Standard abbreviations
- ISO 4: Secur. Hum. Rights

Indexing
- ISSN: 1874-7337 (print); 1875-0230 (web)

Links
- Journal homepage

Security and Human Rights is a magazine that was formerly known as the Helsinki Monitor. It was established in 1990 and obtained its current name in 2008. The journal is published by Martinus Nijhoff Publishers on behalf of the Netherlands Helsinki Committee and is a legacy of the Helsinki Accords, which during the Cold War were intended to provide a bridge between Eastern and Western Europe on the basis of common principles and co-operative security.

Security and Human Rights is published quarterly and covers issues related to the work and principles of the Organization for Security and Co-operation in Europe.
