= Mirja Ryynänen =

Finnish politician and teacher (born 1944)

Personal details
- Born: 11 November 1944 (age 81)
- Party: Centre Party
- Education: University of Helsinki
- Occupation: Teacher

Mirja Ryynänen (born 1944) is a Finnish politician from the Centre Party who served at the Finnish Parliament and European Parliament.

== Biography ==
Ryynänen was born on 11 November 1944. She graduated from the University of Helsinki. Following her graduation she worked as a teacher in Maaninka. She was a member of Parliament for Center Party for two terms: between 1987 and 1994 and between 1999 and 2003. In 1995 she was elected to the European Parliament from the Centre Party and served there in the 4th term. She was part of the European Liberal, Democrat and Reform Party, and her tenure ended in 1999.

In 2003 Ryynänen was elected vice-chairman of the newly established Development Policy Committee. She is the first chair of the Demo Finland, a cooperative organisation of all Finnish parliamentary parties, serving in the post between 2006 and 2007. Then she was named as its honorary chair.

Ryynänen is married to Erkki Ryynänen, and they live in Maaninka.
