= USS New York (LPD-21) =

San Antonio–class amphibious transport dock

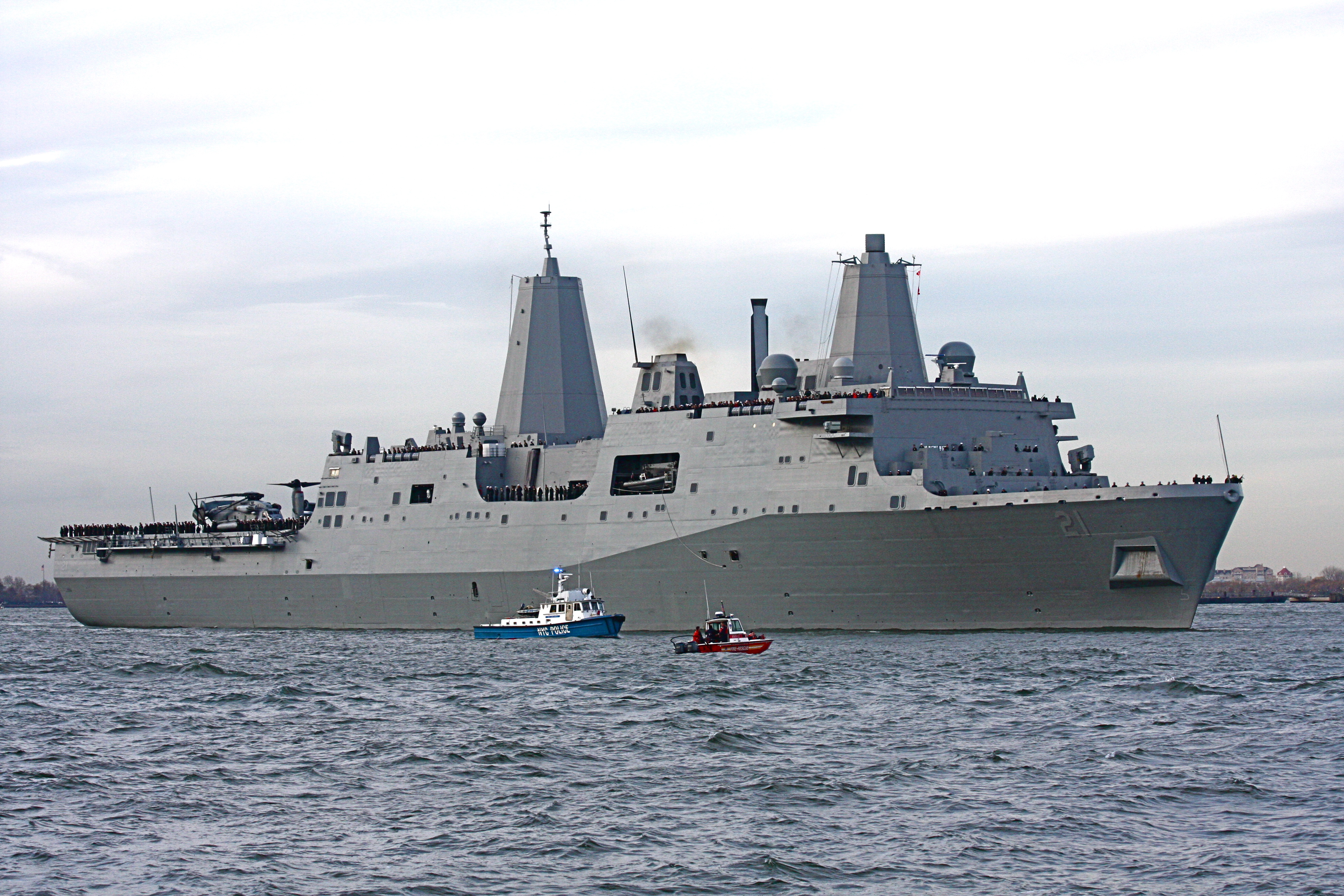
- USS New York in the Hudson River on 2 November 2009

History

United States
- Name: New York
- Namesake: New York, U.S.
- Awarded: 25 November 2003
- Builder: Northrop Grumman Ship Systems
- Laid down: 10 September 2004
- Launched: 19 December 2007
- Christened: 1 March 2008
- Acquired: 21 August 2009
- Commissioned: 7 November 2009
- Home port: Naval Station Norfolk
- Identification: MMSI number: 369970522; Callsign: NNYK; Pennant number: LPD-21
- Motto: Strength forged through sacrifice. Never forget
- Status: in active service
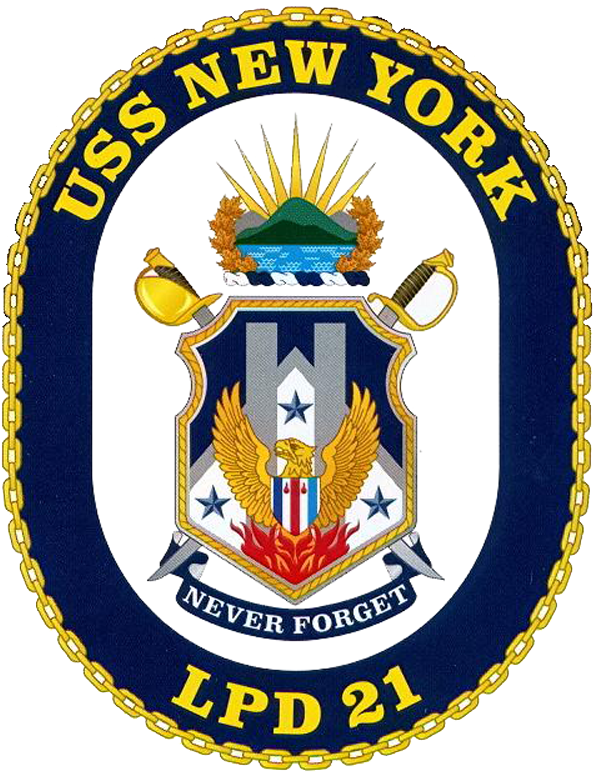
- Badge

General characteristics
- Class & type: San Antonio-class amphibious transport dock
- Displacement: 24,900 tons full
- Length: 208.5 m (684 ft 1 in) overall; 201.4 m (660 ft 9 in) waterline
- Beam: 31.9 m (104 ft 8 in) extreme; 29.5 m (96 ft 9 in) waterline
- Draft: 7.0 m (23 ft 0 in))
- Propulsion: Four 10,400 hp (7,755 kW) sequentially turbocharged marine Colt-Pielstick diesel engines, two shafts, 41,600 hp (31,021 kW), driving Rolls-Royce controllable-pitch propellers
- Speed: In excess of 22 knots (25 mph; 41 km/h)
- Boats & landing craft carried: 2 LCACs or 1 LCU; 14 AAVs
- Capacity: Embarked Landing Force: 699; (66 officers, 633 enlisted); surge capacity to 800
- Complement: 28 officers, 332 enlisted
- Armament: Two Bushmaster II 30 mm Close in Guns, fore and aft; two Rolling Airframe Missile launchers, fore and aft.
- Aircraft carried: Launch or land; two CH-53E Super Stallion; two MV-22B Osprey tiltrotor aircraft; four CH-46 Sea Knight; four AH-1 SeaCobra or; four UH-1 Iroquois helicopters.

USS New York (LPD-21) is a San Antonio-class amphibious transport dock, and the fifth ship of the United States Navy named after the state of New York.

== Naming ==
Shortly after September 11, 2001, Governor of New York George E. Pataki wrote a letter to Secretary of the Navy Gordon R. England requesting that the Navy bestow the name New York on a surface warship involved in the Global War on Terrorism in honor of the victims of the September 11 attacks. Pataki wrote that he understood state names were reserved for submarines, but he asked for special consideration so the name could be given to a surface ship. The request was approved on 28 August 2002.

=== Sister ships names announced ===
On 9 September 2004 Gordon R. England, then the Deputy Secretary of Defense, announced that two of New York's sister ships would be named Arlington and Somerset in commemoration of the places where two of the other planes used in the attacks came down: Arlington County, Virginia, and Somerset County, Pennsylvania.

== Construction ==
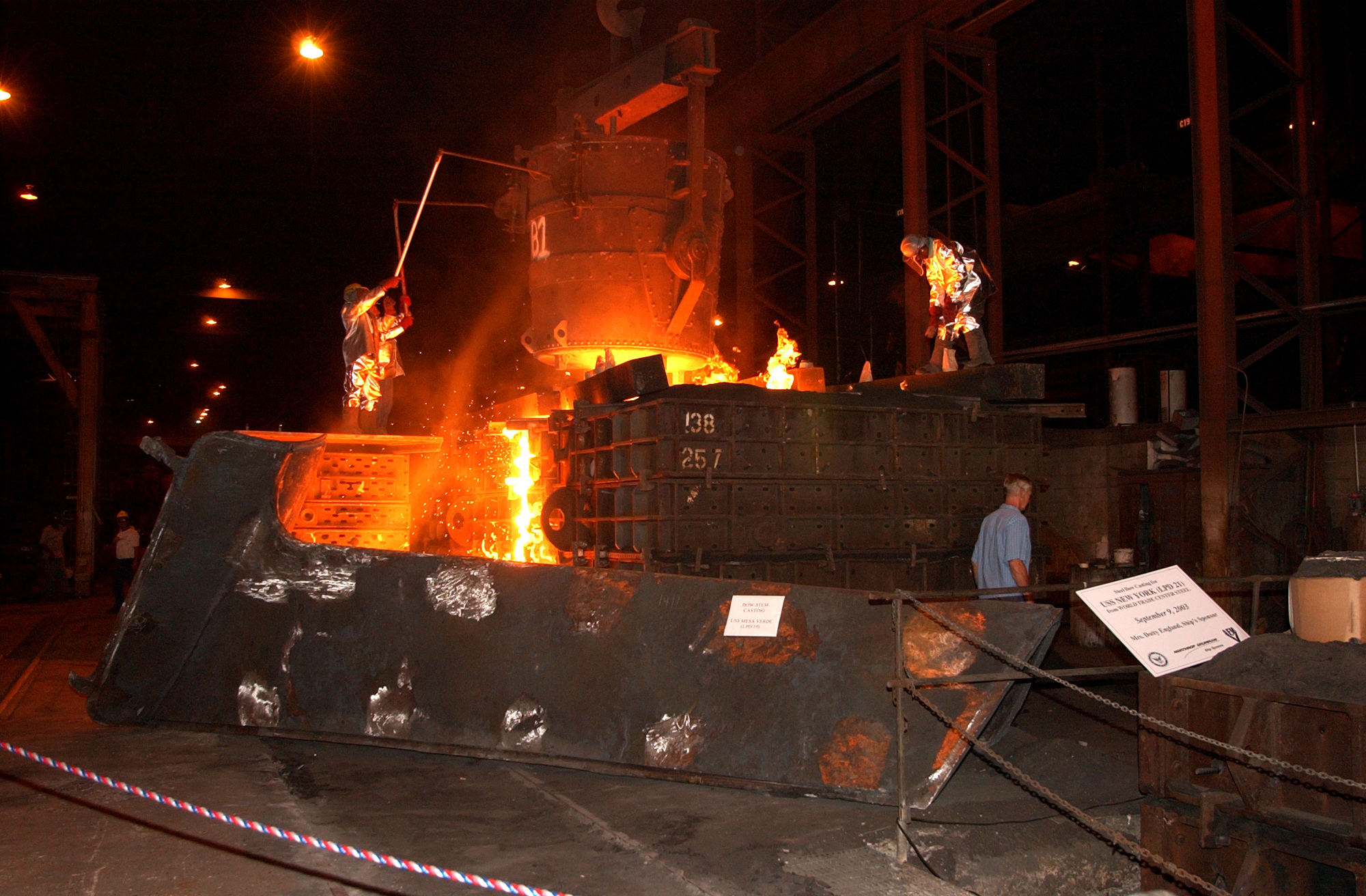
Steel from the World Trade Center is melted and poured for construction of New York, September 2003.

A symbolic amount of steel salvaged from the World Trade Center after it was destroyed in the September 11 attacks was used in her construction.

The ship is the first to be specifically designed to support both of the Marines' primary mobility capabilities, LCAC landing craft and MV-22B Osprey aircraft.

The contract to build New York was awarded to Northrop Grumman Ship Systems of New Orleans, Louisiana, in 2003. New York was under construction in New Orleans at the time of Hurricane Katrina in 2005.

7.5 short tons (6.8 t) of the steel used in the ship's construction came from the rubble of the World Trade Center; this represents less than one thousandth of the total weight of the ship. The steel was melted down at Amite Foundry and Machine in Amite, Louisiana, to cast the ship's bow section. It was poured into the molds on 9 September 2003, with 7 short tons (6.4 t) cast to form the ship's "stem bar"—part of the ship's bow. The foundry workers reportedly treated it with "reverence usually accorded to religious relics," gently touching it as they walked by. One worker delayed his retirement after 40 years of working to be part of the project.

== Christening and delivery ==
New York was christened on 1 March 2008, in a ceremony at Avondale Shipyard in New Orleans. Ship sponsor Dotty England, wife of Deputy Defense Secretary Gordon R. England, smashed the traditional champagne bottle on the ship's bow and christened the ship New York. Several dignitaries were in attendance, including Louisiana Congressman William J. Jefferson, members of the New York City Police Department and the New York City Fire Department, and family members of victims of the September 11 attacks. The champagne bottle did not break the first time it was struck against the hull of the ship, but the second attempt was successful.

The ship was delivered to the Navy on 21 August 2009 at New Orleans. She set sail for Norfolk, Virginia, on 13 October 2009. On 2 November 2009 the ship passed the World Trade Center site for the first time and gave the site a 21-gun salute.

== Commissioning and trials ==
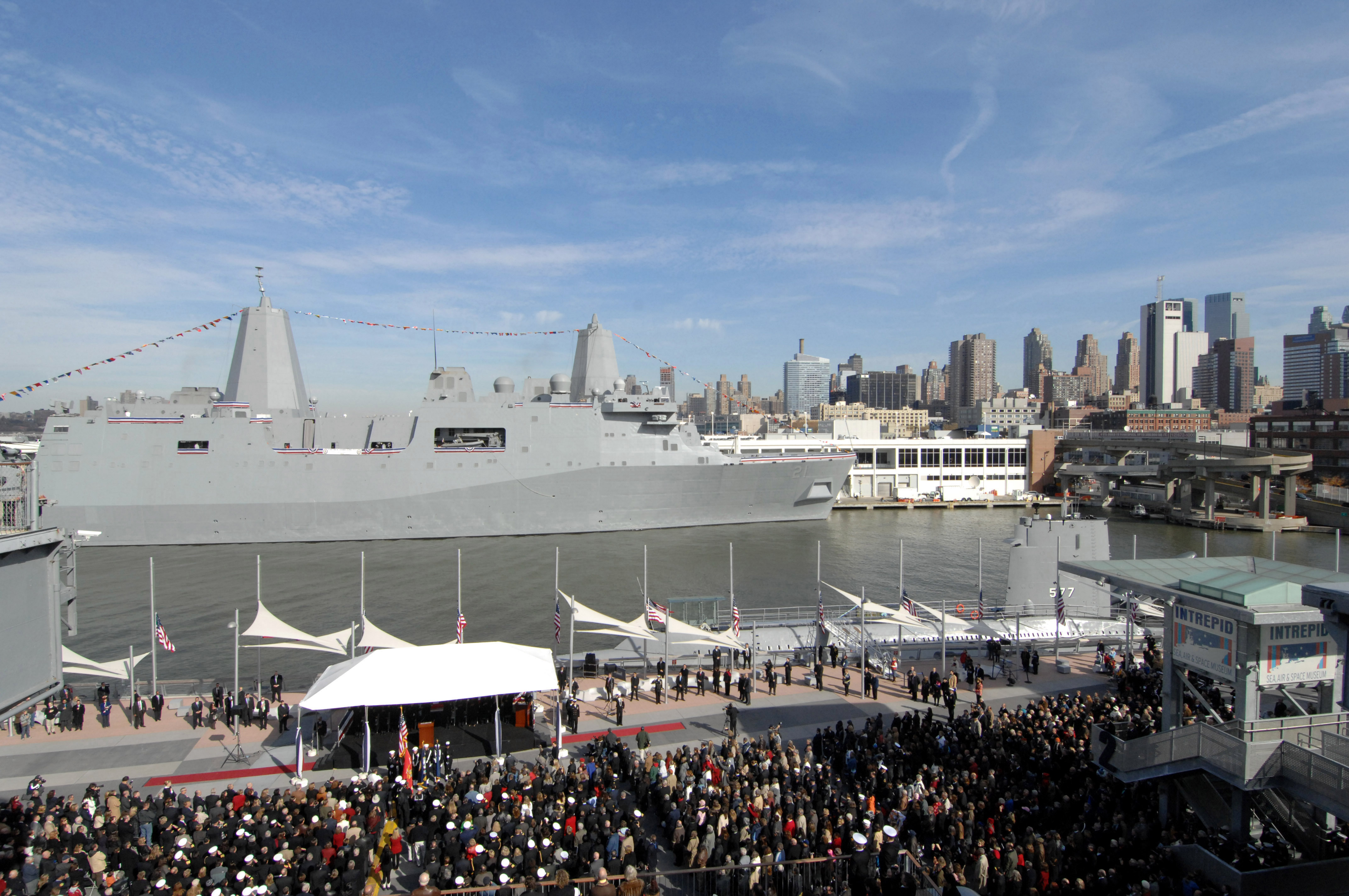
New York at her commissioning ceremony

The commissioning ceremony for New York took place on 7 November 2009, in New York City. Speakers included Secretary of State Hillary Clinton, Secretary of the Navy Ray Mabus, Governor David Paterson, Mayor Michael Bloomberg, Chief of Naval Operations Admiral Gary Roughead, and Commandant of the Marine Corps General James T. Conway. Approximately one in seven of the plank owners are from New York state, a larger number than usual.

== Propulsion ==
New York uses four Fairbanks-Morse license-built MAN Colt-Pielstick PC2.5 STC sequentially turbocharged marine diesel engines with inboard rotating Rolls-Royce controllable-pitch propellers. The V16-cylinder Colt-Pielstick PC2.5 STC engine is intended for use on ships requiring high propulsion power combined with a lightweight installation. Each V16 PC2.5 STC diesel engine weighs 84 metric tons (83 long tons) dry without flywheel.

On 11 January 2010, the Navy announced that the ship would have to undergo repairs for faulty engine parts after inspectors discovered the "premature failure" of bearings on the ship's main propulsion diesel engines during a week-long sea trial following the November commissioning.

== Service history ==
=== 2012 ===
On 10 June 2012 the ship was deployed for the first time to the Strait of Hormuz and the Persian Gulf region. She deployed with Marines from 1st Battalion, 2nd Marine Regiment, 2nd Marine Division and returned in December 2012 along with USS Iwo Jima, USS Gunston Hall and the Marines from the same unit attached to all three ships.

=== 2014 ===
In June 2014, the ship was used to transport Ahmed Abu Khattala, suspected mastermind of the 2012 Benghazi attack on the American diplomatic mission at Benghazi, back to the United States.

=== 2017 ===
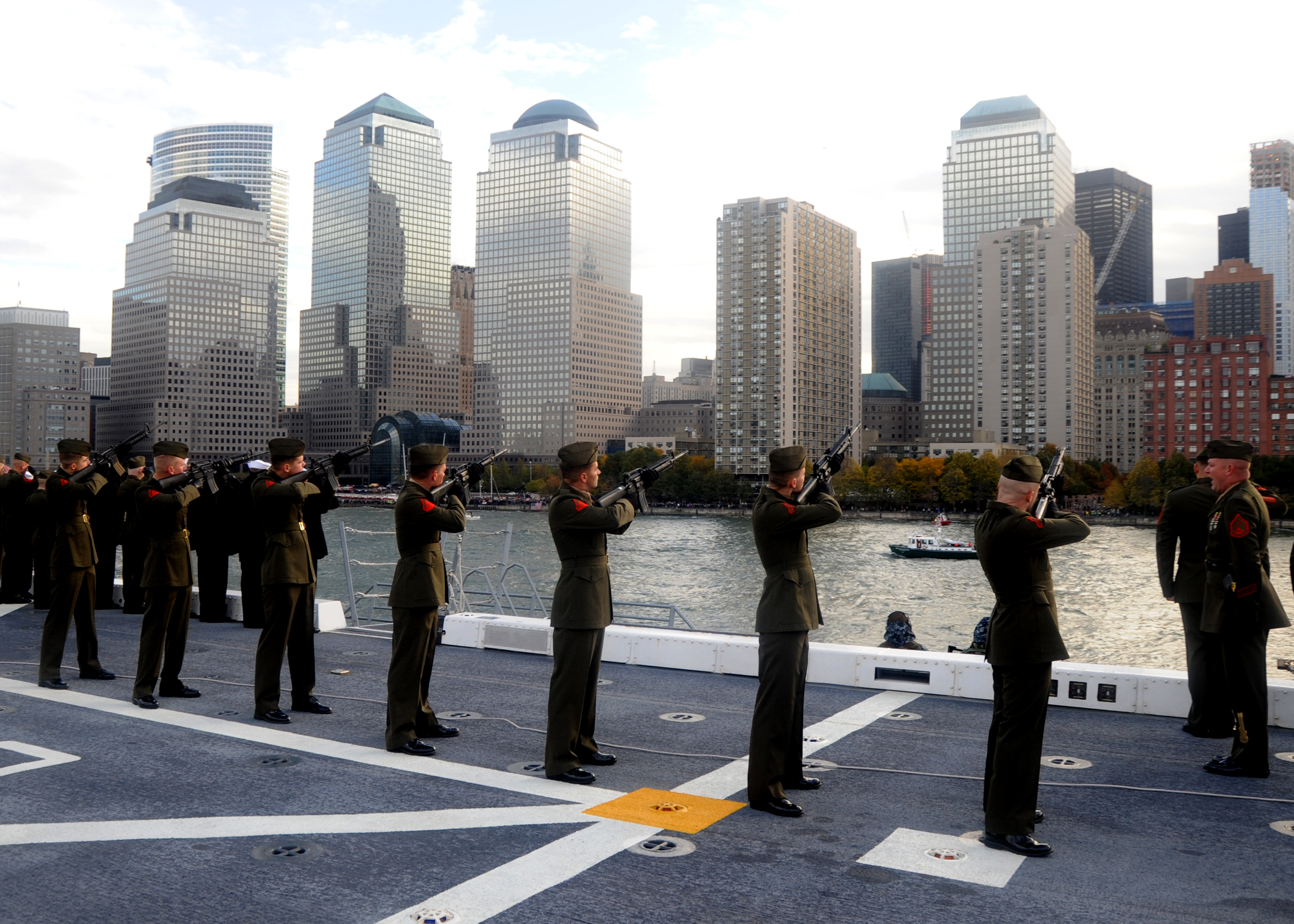
Marines fire a 21-gun salute from the deck as the ship passes Ground Zero

On 11 September 2017, New York arrived off the Florida coast for Hurricane Irma relief, 16 years to the day after the 9/11/2001 terrorist attacks.

=== 2018 ===
New York supported the reception night for the 23rd International Seapower Symposium at the Naval War College in Newport, RI in September 2018. In November, the ship supported Exercise Trident Juncture, a large scale NATO exercise involving more than 50,000 personnel, 65 ships, and 250 aircraft, including 14,000 American troops, a Carrier Strike Group (CSG) and an Amphibious Readiness Group (ARG).
