= Netherlands Helsinki Committee =

The Netherlands Helsinki Committee (NHC) is a non-governmental organization that promotes human rights and strengthens the rule of law and democracy in all countries of Europe, and the Central Asian countries participating in the Organization for Security and Co-operation in Europe (OSCE).

== Background ==
NHC was founded in 1987 to provide input on Human Rights, Economics and the Environment, and Security aspects of the Helsinki Accords. Max van der Stoel was among the founding members of the organization. The NHC belongs to the Helsinki Committee for Human Rights organizations found throughout Europe.

The NHC builds capacity of civil society and governmental bodies with a focus on strengthening legal protection and improving public policies that affect vulnerable or disadvantaged groups. The organization cooperates with human rights NGOs, human rights lawyers and with the Council of Europe promoting rights-based approaches to human trafficking. The NHC also works on improving prison conditions and supporting probation services. Together with Leiden University and The Hague Academy for Local Governance, the NHC implements the Matra Rule of Law Training program, aiming to strengthen institutional capacity building through training professionals from Albania, Bosnia-Herzegovina, Georgia, Kosovo, Moldova, North Macedonia, Serbia, Turkey, and Ukraine.

The NHC supports human rights defenders and NGOs to withstand governmental pressure, improves the implementation of OSCE human dimension commitments and other international human rights agreements. It plays an active role in several civil society networks of human rights NGOs in Europe, including the Civil Solidarity Platform, EU-Russia Civil Society Forum, and Breed Mensen Overleg.

The NHC publishes pieces on human rights in Security and Human Rights, formerly known as the Helsinki Monitor, today the online journal Security and Human Rights Monitor.

In 2025, the NHC was declared an undesirable organization in Russia.
