= Demo Finland =

Finnish organization promoting democracy in other countries

Political Parties of Finland for Democracy - Demo Finland is a co-operative organisation of all the eight Finnish parliamentary parties supporting multi-party democracy in new and developing democracies. It was established in 2006. Its first chair is Mirja Ryynänen who is now its honorary chair.

Demo Finland's member parties are Centre Party (Finland), Finns Party, National Coalition Party, Social Democratic Party of Finland, Green League, Left Alliance (Finland), Swedish People's Party of Finland and Christian Democrats (Finland).
