= Ahmed Abu Khattala =

Libyan militia commander (born 1971)

- أحمد أبو ختال
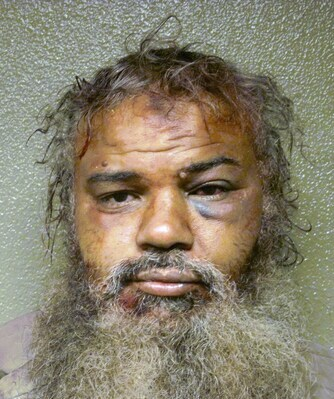
- Abu Khattala shortly after his capture in June 2014
- Born: Ahmed Abu Khattala; 7 May 1971 (age 55); Libya
- Occupation: Construction contractor
- Known for: Participation in the 2012 Benghazi attack
- Status: Incarcerated at ADX Florence
- Convictions: Conspiracy to provide material support or resources to terrorists (18 U.S.C. § 2339B); Providing material support or resources to terrorists (18 U.S.C. § 2339B); Maliciously destroying and injuring dwellings and property and placing lives in jeopardy within the special maritime and territorial jurisdiction of the United States (18 U.S.C. § 1363); Using a semiautomatic assault weapon during a crime of violence (18 U.S.C. § 924)
- Penalty: 22 years imprisonment; resentenced to 28 years in 2024

Ahmed Salim Faraj Abu Khattala (Arabic: أحمد أبو ختال; born 7 May 1971) is a Libyan militia commander who was active during the 2011 Libyan civil war. He participated in the 2012 Benghazi attack on the American diplomatic mission at Benghazi, in which Ambassador J. Christopher Stevens and three other Americans were killed.

In a December 2013 article about the attack, The New York Times described him as a central figure in the attack according to Libyan witnesses, although he had no known affiliations with terrorist groups. Abu Khattala denied killing the Americans or being part of the attack. In his trial in U.S. federal court in 2017, Abu Khattala was acquitted of 14 charges, including murder, but convicted of four lesser terrorism-related crimes.

== Early life ==
Abu Khattala grew up in el-Leithi, a Benghazi neighborhood named after the River of Oblivion. He had nine years of formal schooling before earning certification as a car mechanic. After briefly working as a car mechanic, Khattala, spent most of his adult life in Abu Salim prison in Tripoli, jailed by the government of Muammar Gaddafi for his Islamic extremism.

== Role in 2011 Libyan civil war ==
During the 2011 Libyan civil war, he formed his own militia of "perhaps two dozen fighters", naming it Obayduh bin Jarrah for an early Islamic general.

In June, he marched in a parade which also included February 17 Brigade, Libya Shield Force, the Supreme Security Committee, and Ansar al-Shariah, a "group of as many as 200 militants" who had broken away from the other militias in 2012 in protest of those militias' support for parliamentary elections in Libya.

== Political views ==
He opposed American involvement in Libya and in interviews with The New York Times stated that "the enmity between the American government and the peoples of the world is an old case." Regarding the role of the NATO air campaign that overthrew Gaddafi, he believed that if NATO had not intervened, "God would have helped us." He also said "We know the United States was working with both sides" and that the US aimed at "splitting up" Libya.

== Charges ==
Witnesses of the 11 September 2012 attack on the American diplomatic compound in Benghazi say they saw Abu Khattala leading the attack. On 6 August 2013, U.S. officials confirmed that Abu Khattala had been charged with playing a significant role in the attack. According to NBC, the charges were filed under seal in Washington, D.C. in late July 2013.

== Capture ==
On the weekend of 14–15 June 2014, U.S. Delta Force special operations personnel captured Abu Khattala in a covert mission, codenamed "Greenbrier River", in Libya, using an informant to lure him to an isolated villa by the coastline. According to court records, Khattala was armed with a handgun and violently resisted capture, before he was handcuffed, blindfolded, gagged, and earmuffed. He was brought to Washington, D.C. aboard the amphibious transport dock USS New York. He was given three medical staples while aboard in treatment of his injuries.

Following his capture, Abu Khattala was kept in a cell where the lights were kept on for twenty hours a day, and interrogated for five days before being given a Miranda advisory.

== Prosecution in the United States ==
On 26 June 2014, Abu Khattala was indicted by a federal grand jury in the United States District Court for the District of Columbia on one federal charge of conspiracy to provide material support and resources to terrorists resulting in death. This one-count indictment was described by U.S. officials as a placeholder indictment to allow Abu Khattala to be brought to court and allow more time for a grand jury to hear more evidence.

On 14 October 2014, a superseding indictment against Abu Khattala was filed, adding 17 new charges. Of these, several carry a possible capital sentence: "one count of murder of an internationally protected person; three counts of murder of an officer and employee of the United States; four counts of killing a person in the course of an attack on a federal facility involving the use of a firearm and a dangerous weapon; and two counts of maliciously damaging and destroying U.S. property by means of fire and an explosive causing death." Seven other non-capital charges were added: "one count of providing material support and resources to terrorists resulting in death; three counts of attempted murder of an officer and employee of the United States; two counts of maliciously destroying and injuring dwellings and property, and placing lives in jeopardy within the Special Maritime and Territorial Jurisdiction of the United States, and attempting to do the same; and one count of using, carrying, brandishing and discharging a firearm during a crime of violence, which carries a mandatory minimum sentence of 30 years in prison."

Abu Khattala pleaded not guilty to the charges in October 2014. Abu Khattala, through his attorneys, filed a motion asking for a court order to return him to Libya and forgo the death penalty. Abu Khattala claimed that his right to due process was violated by his detention and questioning for thirteen days on a U.S. Navy ship and that his prosecution by the U.S. violated Libyan sovereignty. In February 2016, U.S. District Judge Christopher R. Cooper denied Abu Khattala's motion.

Abu Khattala's trial began on 2 October 2017, and was expected to last five weeks. In his opening statements, Khattala's lawyer, Jeffrey Robinson, denied Khattala's participation in the attacks.

On 28 November 2017, a jury in Washington acquitted Abu Khattala of 14 of the 18 charges he faced after deliberating for five days following the seven-week trial. He was convicted of four lesser charges, including conspiracy to provide material support for terrorism, maliciously destroying and injuring dwellings and property as well as using and carrying a semi-automatic weapon during a crime of violence.

On 27 June 2018, Abu Khattala was sentenced to 22 years in prison. The judge spared him from a possible life sentence, saying he had essentially been convicted of property crimes. As of 2022, Abu Khattala is incarcerated at ADX Florence, the federal supermax prison in Florence, Colorado.

Abu Khattala's sentence was overturned in July 2022 by a DC Circuit Court of Appeals who ruled that a 22-year sentence was too short given the gravity of Khattala's crimes and the vital need to deter such crimes. On 26 September 2024, Khattala was resentenced to 28 years in prison.
