= Dhobley (Lower Juba Region) =

Dhobley Dhoobley Liboi-Somalia
- Town
- Nickname: Libooyo Somaali
- Motto: Dhoobley ku Dhereg (Fill up the Dhobley)
- Location in Somalia.
- Coordinates: 0°24′38″N 41°0′35″E
- Country: Somalia
- Regional State: Jubaland
- Region: Lower Juba
- District: Dhobley District
- Established: 1970s
- Time zone: UTC+3 (EAT)

Dhobley, formerly known as Liboi-Somalia, is a strategic border town located in south-western Somalia's Lower Juba Region. It is located immediately along the Kenya border. Having been settled only in the 1970s, its strategic location along the border has since made it the second largest city in the Jubaland State after Kismayo, the State capital. It is located about 15 kilometers northeast of the Kenyan city of Liboi, a town of about 100,000 people.

== History ==
The town was established between 1971 and 1974 by a group of pastoralists who settled to rear their livestock.

After the collapse of the central government in 1991, Dhobley saw a large number of Somali refugees heading to Kenya, especially to the refugee camp that was then at Liboi. Dhobley was at that time a transit point for people fleeing the war in the country. In 1993, Dhobley became an official settlement for internally displaced families and residents.

At the beginning of 2007, with the outbreak of the current phase of the Somali Civil War, Kenya largely closed its border with Somalia, fearing the influx of militant Islamists and small arms among the refugees. Thousands of rejected refugees remained in Dhobley under precarious conditions as internally displaced persons. On 3 March 2008, a missile attack launched by U.S. naval forces struck Dhobley, targeting Saleh Ali Saleh Nabhan, an Al-Qaeda activist held responsible for the 1998 embassy bombings in Nairobi. At least four people were killed and 20 injured.

On 3 April 2011, in the Battle of Lower Juba, forces of the Somali transitional government, together with the Raskamboni Movement, captured Dhobley from al-Shabaab, shelling the city in the process. Ten fighters were killed during the attack. In October 2011, the Kenyan military seized control of Dhobley as part of Operation Linda Nchi, after a series of kidnappings, particularly of foreign aid workers. In March 2012, the invading Kenyan forces "rehatted," becoming part of the African Union Mission to Somalia. Since then, the town has been controlled by the Somali government together with foreign forces.

In March 2020, the Somali National Army, together with the Kenya Defence Forces, opened a new military base, the Dhobley Forward Operating Base, on the north side of the town. In May 2024, the Kenya Army Engineers Brigade completed a tarmac road between Dhobley and Afmadow, as part of the African Union Transition Mission in Somalia. An airstrip serving the Dhobley base was overhauled by Kenyan forces in 2025.

== Administrative ==
Dhobley has all the following areas:

- Diif Somali
- Tuulo Barwaaqo
- Deg-ilima
- Tabto
- Sukaylaa
- Daku
- Bilis Qooqaani,
- Kulmis
- Wadajir
- Durdur
- Basro
- Yaraa lafa geri
- Daar daar
- Dhagax
- Laanta Shabaax

and many more.

== Economy ==
The main sources of income in Dhobley are the livestock trade, cross-border trade such as currency exchange, the airport of the city, and the transport tax between the two countries.

== Education ==
Dhobley has 8 schools, three of which are high schools.

== Infrastructure ==
The district is rich in water and has about eight water boreholes and irrigates all the surrounding areas and a large number of livestock who come to the city during the drought in the districts around Dhobley and in the region NFD.
