= Charcoal trafficking in Somalia =

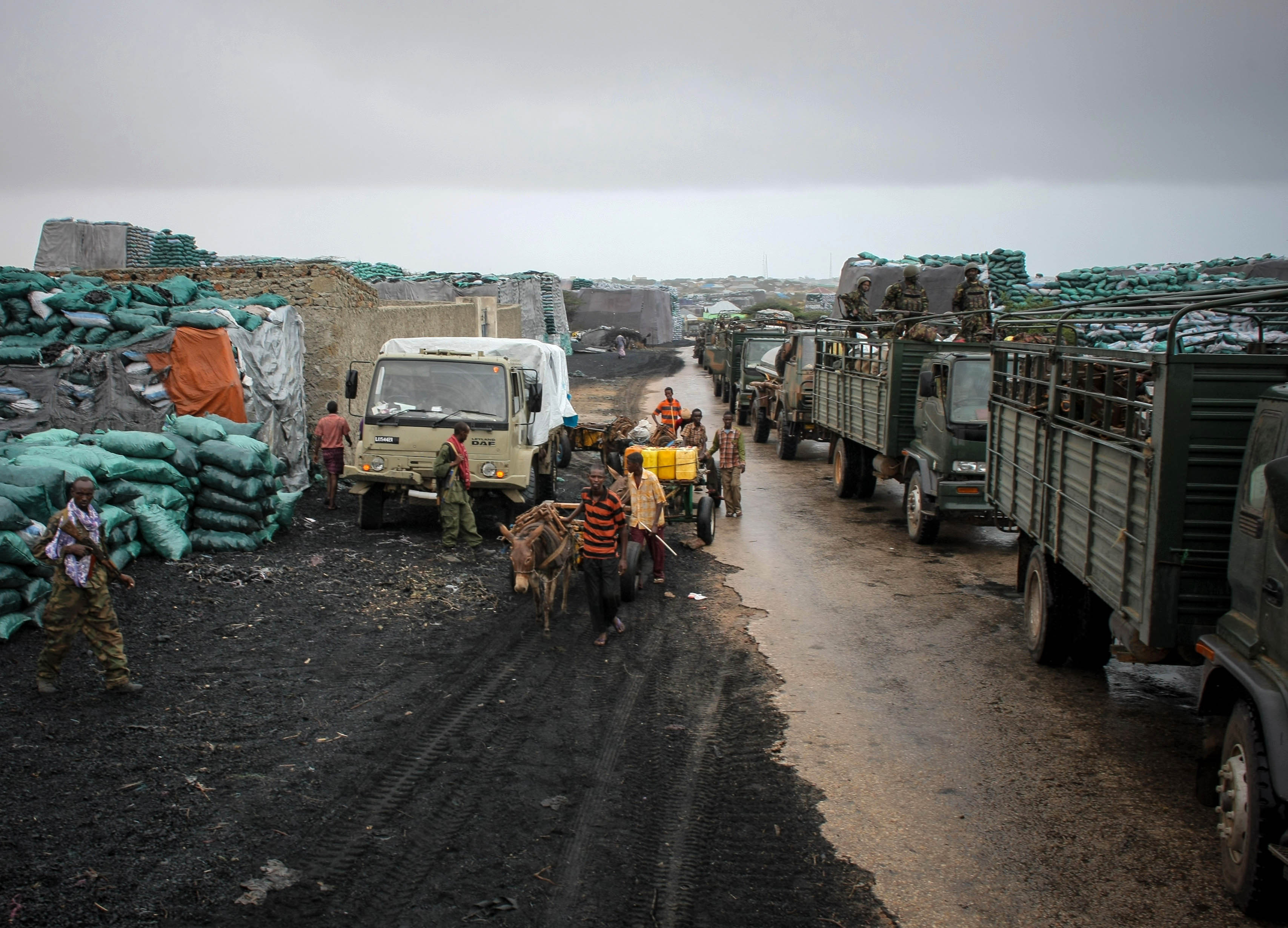
Somali youths pull donkey-drawn water carts past sacks of charcoal as a convoy of the Kenyan Contingent serving with the African Union Mission in Somalia (AMISOM) makes its way through the city of Kismayo. (2012)

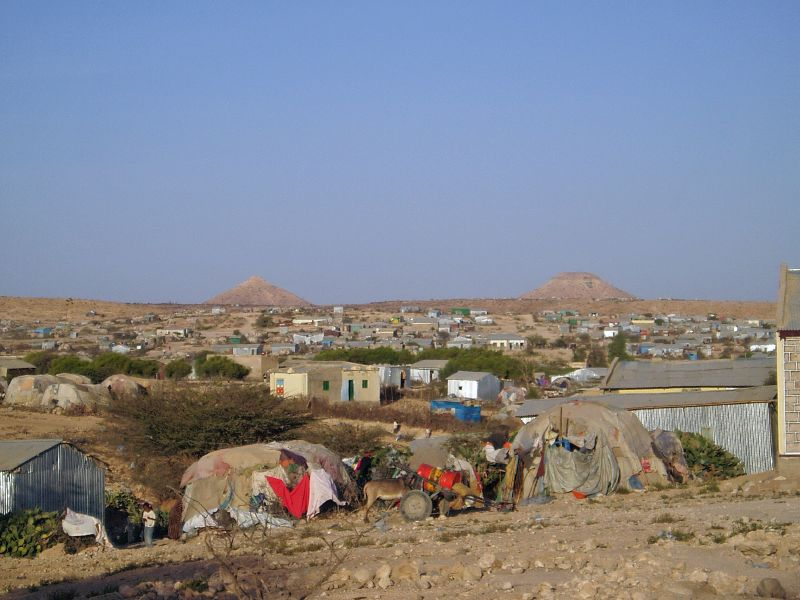
Naasa Hablood hills near Hargeysa, Somalia—the mountains in the background are the symbol of the city and can be seen from most vantage points. Here, there are no amenities provided by the state. The water has to be transported by donkey and both light and cooking fuel is provided by an environmentally unsustainable supply of charcoal. (2005)

When the central government of Somalia collapsed in 1991, the once firmly regulated Somali charcoal trade reopened. In the 1990s, the Somali Civil War, destructive El Niño floods, and reduced access to the European market caused the former prosperous banana industry to collapse, leading to an increase in reliance on the charcoal trade.

Charcoal soon became a lucrative cornerstone of the political economy in Somalia and ultimately turned into one of the most important revenues for criminal networks such as Al-Shabaab. Despite international efforts to curb the trade during the 2010s, it periodically flourished and continues to be a politically destabilising factor in the Horn of Africa region.

For centuries, the trading route has been established through trade with Arabs along the East African coast. It begins with cutting down and burning Acacia trees in Somalia, then transporting the charred remains by land to ports in southern Somalia (notably the ports of Kismayo and Barawe) before it is moved north by sea for over 4000 kilometers to hubs in the Gulf Cooperation Council (GCC) states. Despite a UN Security Council ban on all export of Somali charcoal in 2012, the charcoal trade is often disguised as originating from other countries, and corruption of maritime transport and customs officials is common. Once in the Gulf states, middlemen sell the charcoal in smaller quantities to retailers and restaurants for use in shisha water pipes and grilling meat, respectively.

== Impacts of Somali charcoal trafficking ==
Charcoal trading in the Horn of Africa has resulted in substantial revenues for criminal organisations. During the early 2010s, Al-Shabaab generated US$8–18 million annually by taxing charcoal traffic at a single roadblock. By 2013, the total worth of exports peaked at US$360–384 million per year. Eventually, the trade declined, and by 2018 the wholesale value stood at US$120 to US$150 million per year, with annual revenues to terrorist organisations amounting to US$7.5 to US$10 million. After low to no trade activity in 2019–2021, illicit Somali charcoal trading resurfaced in 2022.

Charcoal trade has a detrimental impact on the environment in Somalia. Notably, charcoal production generates substantial deforestation in the regions of Jubaland, Bay, and Lower Shabelle. The United Nations' Food and Agriculture Organization (FAO) estimates that during the years 2011 to 2017 approximately 8 million acacia trees were felled to produce 16 million bags of charcoal. This means that on average, one tree was cut down every 30 seconds during this seven-year period. If such a rate of deforestation continues, it would result in the complete depletion of trees in Somalia by the year 2060. Deforestation in turn leaves the country vulnerable to droughts, famines, and floodings and increases the risks for conflicts over resources and severe humanitarian crises.

== Drivers of Somali charcoal trafficking ==
Drivers behind the charcoal trafficking are multifaceted. Somali charcoal traders have expressed that the trade is the only sensible livelihood, as employment is difficult to find and lack of rivers and reliable sources of water renders farming tough. United Nations Environment Programme (UNEP) representatives have stressed the need to address poverty and invest in opportunity for business to create conditions for other, sustainable forms of livelihood. Weak state institutions and maritime capabilities to monitor, deter and intercept the trade also drives charcoal trafficking.

A key driver of the illicit charcoal trade is the substantial demand for Somali charcoal in the Gulf Cooperation Council (GCC) states, to whom the bags of charcoal are often marked as legitimate. The business has been lucrative. In 2012, a bag of charcoal that was priced at around 3–4 US$ in Somalia was sold for approximately 10 US$ in the Gulf States. The charcoal trading pattern has exacerbated Somalia's regressive imbalances. It has resulted in Somalia's political elite becoming more reliant on personal patronage and embroiled in competing rivalries, which destabilises both Somalia and the wider Red Sea region.

== United Nations embargo on charcoal exports from Somalia ==
On 22 February 2012 the United Nations Security Council (UNSC) passed resolution 2036 which imposed an embargo on the export of charcoal from Somalia. The resolution prohibits the import of Somali charcoal by member states and calls on neighbouring countries to enforce the embargo. The resolution aimed to cut off funding for Al-Shabaab which had been earning millions of dollars from the charcoal trade to the Gulf states. In 2014, the UNSC followed up with resolution 2182, in which Member States were authorised to inspect ships suspected of carrying charcoal from Somalia in violation of the ban, and to seize and dispose of the illicit cargo by diverting the vessels to a port. Resolution 2182 also emphasized the important role played by regional organizations, such as the African Union, for successful implementation of the embargo. The charcoal ban is still in place and was last reaffirmed in resolution 2662 in November 2022, which also stresses the need to reduce stockpiles in and around Kismayo.

== Key actors ==
The illicit charcoal trade in Somalia is facilitated by a complex network of actors, including traders, transporters, brokers, and wholesalers, as well as those involved in producing fraudulent documents to circumvent the UN embargo on charcoal exports. Various states and international organizations have implemented anti-trafficking measures to combat the trade. This section provides an overview of the key actors involved in either perpetuating or combating the issue of Somali charcoal trafficking.

=== Al-Shabaab ===
In the early 2010s, Al-Shabaab derived its revenues from various sources related to charcoal, including production, transportation taxes, checkpoint fees, port charges, and export taxes.The taxation system imposed by Al-Shabaab has been claimed to be very sophisticated, resembling that of a small nation state.In 2012–2013, the UN monitors identified 39 charcoal traders in Kismayo. Of these, two were linked to Al-Shabaab and managed 32% of the charcoal leaving the city. Periodically, however, Al-Shabaab has also banned charcoal trade in the areas they controlled and disrupted trade to prevent revenue streams to political opponents, mainly Somali authorities. This also seems to be the current strategy.

=== Kenya Defence Forces and African Union Mission In Somalia (AMISOM) ===
According to reports of UN monitors, the Kenyan Defence Forces (KDF) and the African Union Mission in Somalia (AMISOM) have undermined implementation of the charcoal ban. After taking control of important trade routes and key ports (most notably the Kismayo port) from Al-Shabaab through operation "Linda Nchi" in 2012, KDF and AMISOM were directly involved in the charcoal trafficking business, in stark violation of the embargo and explicit instructions of Hassan Sheikh, president of Somalia. In 2011–2012, Kenya argued for lifting the ban to clear the stockpiles around Kismayo but their proposal was rejected by the UN. In 2016, there were reports that Kenyan forces permitted the export of charcoal from Kismayo in exchange for a fee of US$2 per bag. Moreover, KDF and AMISOM have on multiple occasions been reported to deny the federal government and the UN monitors access to stockpiles sites and key ports of export to conduct investigations. KDF and AMISOM have also ignored attempts by UN monitors’ to establish contact with them regarding embargo compliance.

=== Somali authorities ===
The charcoal trade in southern Somalia relies on partnerships between local business communities, mainly in Kismayo, and corrupt regional authorities. The Jubaland State has profited significantly from the illicit charcoal exports by collecting tolls and fees at checkpoints and ports. In 2016, fees of approximately US$3 per bag were levied, resulting in a monthly income of between US$1.1 million and US$1.5 million for the Jubaland administration. The Jubaland administration has also detained laborers at the Kismayo port, including suspected informants. Up until 2018, the Jubba Administration was frequently criticized by UN monitors for poor implementation of the charcoal.

In 2016, UN monitors complained that the Federal Government of Somalia did not take enough action to address existing stockpiles of charcoal, which posed dangers to peace and security in the area. The monitors warned that armed groups may compete for the commercial value of the stockpiled charcoal, and that it could be exported in contravention of the sanctions.

Although the stockpiles are yet to be cleared, the federal government acknowledges the environmental and security threat posed by the trade and has called for increased international cooperation enforce the charcoal ban. Additionally, they have shared information of specific vessels carrying illegal charcoal shipments.

=== Importing countries ===
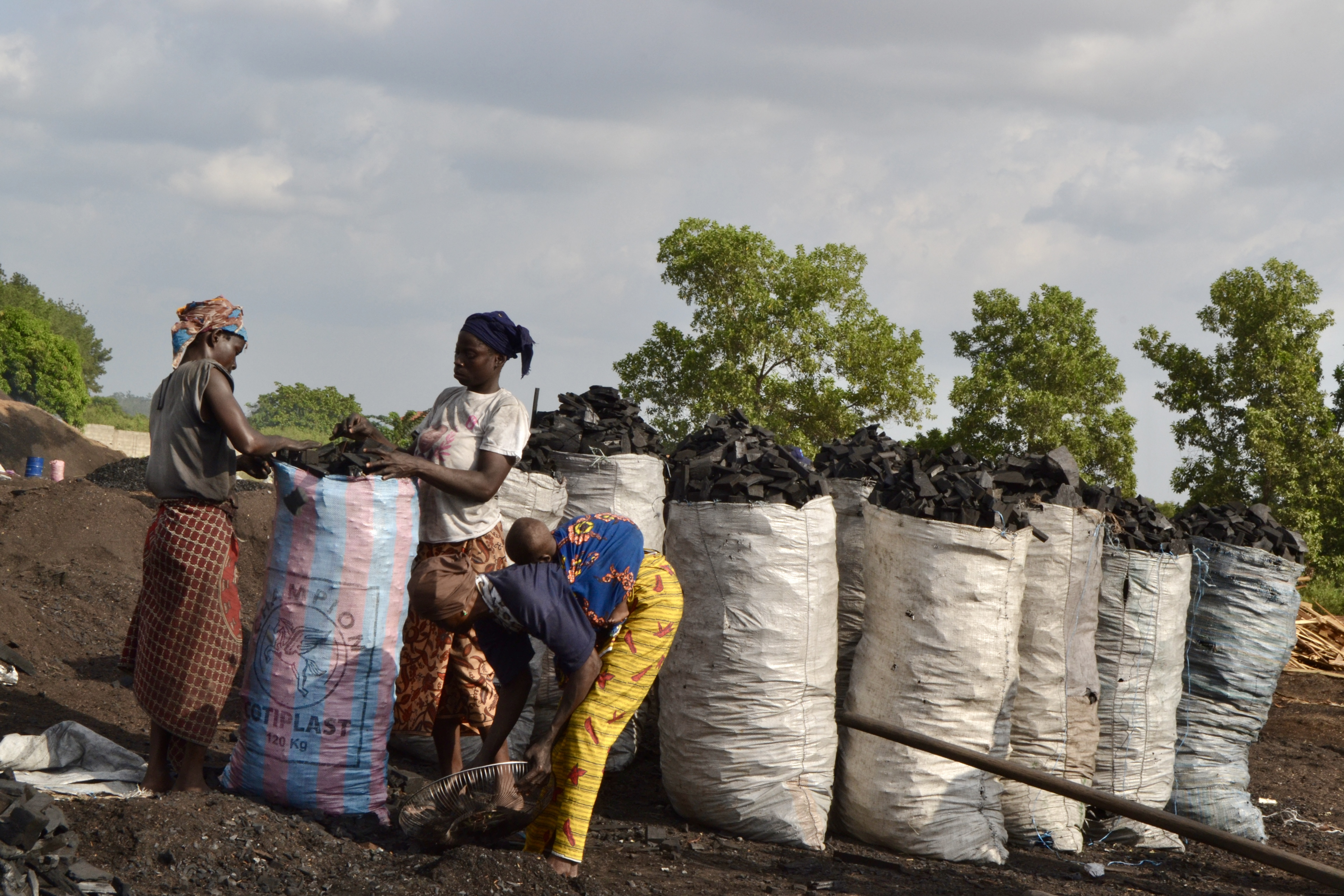
Charcoal trade in Yamoussoukro, Côte d'Ivoire

The main importers of Somali charcoal are the Gulf Cooperation Council (GCC) countries, particularly the United Arab Emirates (UAE). Shisha enthusiasts in the Gulf states highly value Somali charcoal because of its distinct acacia fragrance. UN monitors have repeatedly criticised the GCC states for their inaction in enforcing the charcoal embargo imposed by resolution 2036, and for their lack of collaboration with international actors such as UN officials. In 2013, it was revealed that the six largest charcoal businessmen were identified to be based in Dubai, with some of them having direct ties to Al-Shabaab affiliations.

Eventually key importing countries began to improve their embargo enforcement capabilities. For example, in 2017, Kuwait and Bahrain exhibited proactive commitment and cooperation with UN monitors, leading to seizures of charcoal shipments. In 2018, Iran and Oman declared a halt to charcoal import from countries typically declared as an origin on falsified documents, such as Comoros, Côte d'Ivoire and Ghana.

=== Combined Maritime Forces (CMF) ===
The Combined Maritime Forces (CMF), a multinational naval partnership under the leadership of the US, has actively supported the implementation of the charcoal ban by sharing information with governments and other key actors, thereby facilitating the confiscation of charcoal. CMF have held several conferences together with the Gulf Cooperation Council (GCC) countries aimed at combatting the illegal smuggling of Somali charcoal. At a 2018 conference, held in the CMF headquarters in Bahrain, the attendees agreed to enhance collaboration between CMF, relevant nations and various organisations, such as the United Nations Panel of Experts on Somalia, the United Nations Office on Drugs and Crime (UNODC), GCC, Naval Operations Centres (NOCs), and Maritime Security Centres. The aim of this strengthened partnership is to promote better information sharing and training, thus improving efforts to combat the illegal smuggling of charcoal from Somalia.

In 2019, the Combined Task Force (CTF) 152, which is the CMF branch responsible for maritime security and counterterrorism in the region, hosted a conference to discuss illegal smuggling of charcoal from Somalia with CMF and GCC representatives. Royal Navy Commodore Steve Dainton claimed that "information sharing and collaboration are key to ensuring maritime security". Aside from CTF 152, Combined Task Force 150 also takes part in the disrupting illicit charcoal movements.

=== United Nations actors ===
Several United Nations (UN) organisations, committees and functions conduct anti-trafficking measures to facilitate the implementation of the Somali charcoal embargo. Some of the most important functions are the different monitoring groups that have specifically been tasked with investigating the trade with Somali charcoal. Currently, the Panel of Experts on Somalia is the main monitoring function and releases yearly reports on the current state of the embargo implementation.

The UN Security Council (UNSC) has been actively engaged in anti-trafficking measures. Following a written request from President Hassan Sheikh in October 2014, the UNSC authorized international naval fleets to intercept any vessel suspected of transporting charcoal in the Indian Ocean. The Security Council Committee pursuant to resolution 751 (1992) concerning Al-Shabaab oversees sanctions measures imposed upon Al-Shabaab, including the charcoal ban. In February 2023, Ishikane Kimihiro, chair of the committee, stated that the committee is now increasing its focus on investigations on Al-Shabaab's finances, including violations of the charcoal ban.

The United Nations Office on Drugs and Crime (UNODC) is also involved in charcoal ban enforcement, providing recommendations for the UNSC. The organisation has developed a guide aimed to support officials who come across potentially illegal shipments of charcoal from Somalia. The guide provides detailed guidelines for sampling and classification of charcoal, as well as instructions on writing forensic reports suitable for court processes.

The Programme for Sustainable Charcoal Reduction and Alternative Livelihoods (PROSCAL) was implemented by Somalia in collaboration with the United Nations Environment Programme (UNEP), United Nations Development Programme (UNDP) and the Food and Agriculture Organization (FAO). PROSCAL seeks to provide energy alternatives to communities affected by charcoal production to reduce their reliance on it and to strengthen the capabilities of Somali institutions to enforce the charcoal embargo. However, little information has been released by the UN about the programme's progress and impact.

=== Other actors ===
In 2013, charcoal trade in Kismayo involved Kenyan Somali traders who acted as brokers for larger traders in the United Arab Emirates (UAE) and representatives for individual consignments of charcoal being exported. Some of these traders operated directly on behalf of Al-Shabaab. Some of the individuals involved in the illicit trade are business leaders and politicians who had received support from the international community to rebuild the Somalia's state institutions.

From 2017 onwards, UN monitors observed that illicit charcoal trade appeared to have been facilitated by more formalised transnational criminal networks operating between Somalia and the UAE. Notably, the monitors acquired information regarding the All Star Group corporation, believed to be the primary supplier, trafficker, and investor in the charcoal trade. The corporation held exclusive agreements for both exports and revenue sharing with the Interim Jubba Administration and Al-Shabaab, respectively.

The EU has also played a part in anti-trafficking measures. For example, in 2018 the European Union Naval Force in Somalia (EUNAVFOR or Operation Atalanta) assisted in investigating charcoal trafficking in the region and enabled UN investigations outside Buur Gaabo and Kismayo. EUNAVFOR monitors the Western Indian-Ocean and reports incidents of suspicious vessel activity, such as illegal export of charcoal. However, High Representative/Vice-President of the EEAS Josep Borrell has suggested that an exit for Operation Atalanta should be sought, expressing the need for Somalia to "take full ownership for its own security by the end of 2024". Through the African Peace Facility, the EU granted 1.08 billion Euro between 2007 and 2015 to AMISOM.

== Recent history of the Somali charcoal trade ==
=== 2009–2014 ===
After Al-Shabaab’s capture of the port of Kismayo in 2009, the United Arab Emirates (UAE) began importing Somali charcoal at an increasing rate. In 2011, the UAE imported 143 million kg of Somali charcoal, up from 83 million kg in 2008. Estimates of the total quantity of exported Somali charcoal has varied. UN monitors estimated 3.5 to 4.5 million sacks exported in 2010, whereas statistics from the UAE and Saudi Arabia indicated the quantity to be over 7 million sacks. In 2011, the export increased, with UN monitors estimating the total trade to be 9–10 million sacks, generating US$25 million a year of revenues to Al-Shabaab.

During this period, the creek of Sharjah in the UAE was the main port of entry for charcoal traders, and the UAE also served as a transit point for charcoal repackaged and prepared for re-export to other countries in the region. A similar pattern was observed in Saudi Arabia, where import rose to 107 million kg in 2011, up from 66 million kg in 2010.

Despite the charcoal ban by UNSC resolution 2036 in 2012, both authorities of Somalia and importing Gulf countries failed to take sufficient measures to curb the trade. In fact, the trade continued to increase in the immediate period after the ban.

From 2012 to 2014, the scale of the international trade in Somali charcoal remained consistent, with Al-Shabaab profiting on a larger scale than when they controlled the port of Kismayo. Main importers during this period were the UAE, Oman and Kuwait.

=== From 2015 to 2018 ===
Following the capture of Barawe port by the Somali National Army and AMISOM in October 2014, Al-Shabaab lost control over major export sites for charcoal. In 2015, trade at the port seemingly stopped, and Al-Shabaab's overall role and revenues from charcoal trade decreased. However, export from the remote coastal town of Buur Gaabo expanded, but it was unclear who had authority over the trade.

Despite the local expansion at Buur Gaabo, the total export of Somali charcoal declined in 2015–2016. In 2016 UN monitors approximated the trade to be an average of 5,25 million sacks of charcoal per year. Part of the reason behind the decline was the improvement of enforcement capabilities on part of key importers, most notably the UAE, disincentivizing charcoal exporters in Somalia. Another explanation is that, in 2015, Al-Shabaab shifted strategy towards banning charcoal in areas under their control and attacking traders rather than managing the trade themselves. According to UN monitors, unconfirmed reports of a breakdown in a revenue-sharing agreement between Al-Shabaab and the president of the Jubaland State of Somalia, Ahmed Mohamed Islam, may explain this strategic shift. However, exports of charcoal continued from Kismayo and Buur Gaabo (which were also the main locations for charcoal stockpiling) to Dubai.

In 2016–2017, the level of illegal charcoal exports from southern Somalia remained unchanged compared to previous years. About 4 million sacks were estimated to be exported from Kismayo and Buur Gaabo in 2017. In 2017–2018 the trade declined even more to about 3 million sacks per year. Hamriyah Port in the UAE, Duqm Port and Shinas port in Oman, and the Kish free zone and Qeshm free zone in Iran were the main import points. The two Iranian ports were mainly used for transhipment of Somali charcoal to the UAE.

=== From 2018 to present ===
In 2019, 2020, and 2021 UN monitors did not observe any instances of charcoal exports from Somalia. The last significant shipment took in place August 2018, when 4,750 tons of charcoal, consisting of 190,000 sacks, left Kismayo for Khor Al Zubair port in Iraq. In Iraq, it was repackaged and shipped to neighbouring states from January to April 2019.

According to UN monitors, several possible explanations are linked to the halt in charcoal exports. Notably, key states such as UAE, Oman, Kuwait and Iran had begun implementing the embargo in 2018. Various efforts by the Federal Government of Somalia, Jubaland authorities, and the international community allegedly prevented charcoal exports. The Federal Government of Somalia increased political messaging about the negative environmental impact of charcoal production, contributing to the decline in trade. The Jubaland administration prevented large-scale charcoal exports from Kismayo and Buur Gaabo. International partners, including the CMF, EU Naval Force (through operation Atalanta), FAO, and UNODC, further deterred charcoal traders through satellite and naval monitoring. The use of political pressure, surveillance, and international naval forces acted as strong deterrents combined.

In 2021 charcoal stockpiles at Kismayo and Buur Gaabo amounted to 600,000 to 900,000 sacks. The charcoal trade continues within Somalia as charcoal remains a fundamental source of energy for Somali communities. In 2019, Al-Shabaab resumed attacks on charcoal traders in Somalia to undermine the revenue earned by local administrations.

In 2022 the first significant charcoal export from Somalia since 2018 occurred when the MV Fox illegally exported 4,425 metric tons of charcoal from Kismayo. The vessel eventually had an emergency outside the coast of Oman and was seized by Omani authorities in accordance with resolution 2036 (2012). According to investigations by Correctiv in late 2022, charcoal is also being exported from the ports of Mogadishu and Barawe.

Despite increased efforts to implement the embargo by key actors, weak port control structures, the absence of a capable Somali coast guard, and considerable charcoal stockpiles remain significant risks to continuous implementation. UN monitors recommended a one-time partial liftingof the charcoal embargo in 2022 to facilitate the clean-up of existing stockpiles around Kismayo, which are estimated to be worth US$12 million.

== Charcoal trafficking methods ==
=== Discrete shipments ===
Vessels used to traffic charcoal vary in size. However, smaller dhows with a maximum capacity of around 35,000 sacks are typically the preferred type of vessel by Somali charcoal smugglers. In 2013–2014, traders increasingly began to break up shipments into smaller quantities loaded onto less conspicuous dhows. Many dhow vessels do not use refined navigation systems, which makes it difficult for international maritime organisations and naval forces to track them.

As commodities that were traditionally transported on dhows, such as dates, are now traded in containers following expanded economic liberalisation, dhow owners have expressed concern that there are few other viable cargos besides charcoal. This has pushed dhows into the charcoal shadow economy in the Western Indian Ocean. This has also led to increased suspicion towards dhow owners, who occasionally have been wrongfully condemned for supporting militant groups like Al-Shabaab.

Larger charcoal ships that are equipped with automatic identification system transceivers switch them off to avoid detection. Additionally, traders may mask physical identifying features, such as vessel names. Monitoring shipments is further complicated by the fact that smugglers stockpile and load charcoal in remote locations, such as for example Buur Gaabo, to avoid detection.

=== Sugar-charcoal trade cycle ===
In early 2010s an established trade cycle involved the importation of sugar to Somalia and the export of charcoal to the GCC countries on the same vessels. Charcoal traders would send their ships to Barawe or Kismayo to load charcoal for the return trip after offloading sugar at the port of Mogadishu. In 2012, 26 per cent of the ships offloading at the port of Mogadishu were heading to Kismayo next and most of them originated from Dubai, UAE. Notable cases involved the vessels MV Victoria, MV Diamond Sun, MV Ashraf B and MV Alba Star.

=== Fabricated documentation of origin ===
The falsification of customs documentation has been the primary method of circumventing the charcoal ban. False documentation is used by dhows at the unloading port, mainly in the UAE, to mask their actual port of origin. Forged paperwork claim that Somali charcoal originates from countries such as Comoros, Djibouti, Kenya, Ghana, Côte d'Ivoire, Tanzania or Pakistan. Some certificates of origin are completely forged by charcoal traders without any involvement on part of officials from these countries. In other cases, consulates or embassies of the countries of origin may legally attest the documents or even forge them themselves. For example, forgeries have been reported to be created within the UAE with the help of corrupt intermediaries in exchange for commissions.

The Gulf states’ official records of charcoal imports imply substantial use of fabricated documents. As official import of Somalia declined radically around 2014, imports of charcoal from countries such as the Comoros, Djibouti or Kenya drastically increased. For example, according to data from the UAE, no charcoal was imported from Somalia in 2013 and 2014, whereas the imported charcoal from Djibouti rose from zero in 2011 to almost 41 million kg by 2014.

Repackaging charcoal at transhipment destinations to conceal its origin has also been a common practice to evade the charcoal ban. For example, in 2018 UN monitors reported that Somali charcoal was repackaged in Iran into white bags labelled as "Product of Iran". The charcoal was then reloaded onto smaller Iranian-flagged dhows and exported to the port of Hamriyah, UAE, using false certificates of origin claiming Iran to be the country of manufacture.

=== Flagging of foreign countries ===
Several vessels carrying Somali charcoal have been confirmed to either be owned by Indian nationals or flying the Indian flag. In 2014, UN monitors claimed that many owners of these vessels expressed that they could not provide details about the cargo and its destination because they chartered their vessels to middlemen and brokers. Some owners, however, confirmed that they knew fake certificates of origin were used for the charcoal. The brokers that chartered their vessels were usually based in Dubai.

== See also ==
- Environmental issues in Somalia

== Bibliography ==
- Gridneff, Ilya (2018). "Burning Somalia's Future: The Illegal Charcoal Trade Between the Horn of Africa and the Gulf". In Verhoeven, Harry (ed.). Environmental Politics in the Middle East. Oxford: Oxford University Press. pp. 121–148. ISBN 9780190916688.
- Mahajan, Nidhi (2019). "Dhow Itineraries: The Making of a Shadow Economy in the Western Indian Ocean". Comparative Studies of South Asia, Africa and the Middle East. 39 (3): 407–419. doi:10.1215/1089201X-7885356. S2CID 213275249.
- Monitoring Group on Somalia and Eritrea (27 July 2012), Letter dated 27 June 2012 from the members of the Monitoring Group on Somalia and Eritrea addressed to the Chair of the Security Council Committee pursuant to resolutions 751 (1992) and 1907 (2009) concerning Somalia and Eritrea
- Monitoring Group on Somalia and Eritrea (19 June 2013), Letter dated 19 June 2013 from the members of the Monitoring Group on Somalia and Eritrea addressed to the Chair of the Security Council Committee pursuant to resolutions 751 (1992) and 1907 (2009) concerning Somalia and Eritrea
- Monitoring Group on Somalia and Eritrea (19 September 2014), Letter dated 19 September 2014 from the members of the Monitoring Group on Somalia and Eritrea addressed to the Chair of the Security Council Committee pursuant to resolutions 751 (1992) and 1907 (2009) concerning Somalia and Eritrea (PDF)
- Monitoring Group on Somalia and Eritrea (22 September 2015), Letter dated 22 September 2015 from the members of the Monitoring Group on Somalia and Eritrea addressed to the Chair of the Security Council Committee pursuant to resolutions 751 (1992) and 1907 (2009) concerning Somalia and Eritrea
- Monitoring Group on Somalia and Eritrea (28 September 2016), Letter dated 28 September 2016 from the Monitoring Group on Somalia and Eritrea addressed to the Chair of the Security Council Committee pursuant to resolutions 751 (1992) and 1907 (2009) concerning Somalia and Eritrea
- Monitoring Group on Somalia and Eritrea (2 November 2017), Letter dated 2 November 2017 from the Monitoring Group on Somalia and Eritrea addressed to the Chair of the Security Council Committee pursuant to resolutions 751 (1992) and 1907 (2009) concerning Somalia and Eritrea
- Monitoring Group on Somalia and Eritrea (2 October 2018), Letter dated 2 October 2018 from the Monitoring Group on Somalia and Eritrea addressed to the Chair of the Security Council Committee pursuant to resolutions 751 (1992) and 1907 (2009) concerning Somalia and Eritrea
- Panel of Experts on Somalia (27 September 2019), Letter dated 27 September 2019 from the Panel of Experts on Somalia addressed to the Chair of the Security Council Committee pursuant to resolution 751 (1992) concerning Somalia
- Panel of Experts on Somalia (28 September 2020), Letter dated 28 September 2020 from the Panel of Experts on Somalia addressed to the Chair of the Security Council Committee pursuant to resolution 751 (1992) concerning Somalia
- Panel of Experts on Somalia (16 September 2021), Letter dated 16 September 2021 from the Panel of Experts on Somalia addressed to the Chair of the Security Council Committee pursuant to resolution 751 (1992) concerning Somalia
- Panel of Experts on Somalia (1 September 2022), Letter dated 1 September 2022 from the Panel of Experts on Somalia addressed to the Chair of the Security Council Committee pursuant to resolution 751 (1992) concerning Somalia
