= Battle of Lower Juba =

2011 battle in Somalia

Battle of Jubadda Hoose
- Part of Somali Civil War, War in Somalia (2009-present)
Date	1 April–16 October 2011
Location	Lower Juba, Somalia
Result	Somali troops and Raskamboni movement infiltrate southern Somalia; Operation Linda Nchi

Belligerents
Harakat al-Shabaab Mujahideen	(Somalia) Transitional Federal Government Raskamboni movement

Commanders and leaders
Fuad Shangole	Ahmed Mohamed Islam (Somalia) Ilyaas badal

Casualties and losses
Total: + 75 killed	Total: + 3 killed, 12 injured
- Based largely on al-Shabaab claims which were not confirmed

Early in the morning on 1 April 2011, Somali and Raskamboni troops launched an attack on the strategic town of Dhobley. A few hundred Somali troops attacked the town from the Kenyan border. After a few hours of attacks the Somali troops seized Dhobley, resulting in a counterattack from Al Shabaab. Al Shabaab received reinforcements from Afmadow and Kismayo, but the counterattack failed. Somali Armed Forces remained in control of Dhobley and lost 3 soldiers during these operations.
