= Khar-Khar =

- Populated place
- Location in Somalia.
- Coordinates: 0°17′30″N 42°21′49″E
- Country: Somalia
- Region: Jubbada Hoose
- Time zone: UTC+3 (EAT)

Khar-Khar is a populated place in the southern Lower Juba (Jubbada Hoose) region of Somalia.
