= Kismayo University =

University in Somalia

- Other name: KU
- Motto: "Towards a brighter future"
- Type: Private non-profit
- Established: September 5, 2005; 21 years ago
- President: Mohamed Abdi Aden
- Students: 7050
- Location: Kismayo, Lower Jubba, Somalia
- Campus: 3 campuses in Kismayo and 1 campus in Dhobley
- Website: Official website

Kismayo University is a private university located in Kismayo, Somalia's third largest city.

== Background ==
Since the collapse of the Somali central government in 1991, all the educational institutions and other public properties were destroyed. This caused mass migration of Somali intellectuals from the country. Years later, some of the Somali intellectuals recognized the need for primary and secondary education. Consequently, non-profit organizations have been established to meet the educational needs of those who graduated from local schools in the war torn country. In response to the aforementioned situations, Kismayo University was founded in the coastal City of Kismayo as the first university ever established in the Jubaland region of Somalia.

Founders of the university, administrators and policymakers want to hold on to young people leaving the city to find higher education elsewhere. The founding of Kismayo University in September 2005, created 20+ postsecondary spaces. The obvious result will be opportunity for university education for local high school graduates and adults who would like to continue their education in the region instead of going to Mogadishu, Hargeisa, or neighboring Kenya.

The main campus just north of Kismayo, next to the Old Kismayo Airport, was built in 2009.

== Governance and management ==
The Supreme governance bodies of the university are made up of:

- Board of Trustees
- University Senate
- Academic Council
- Operations Board
- Development Board

== Faculties ==
- Faculty of Economics and Management Sciences
  - Bachelor of Business Administration
  - Bachelor of Accounting
  - Bachelor of Public Administration
- Faculty of Computer Studies
  - Bachelor of Computer Science
  - Bachelor of Information Technology
- Faculty of Medicine and Health Sciences
  - Bachelor of General Nursing
  - Bachelor of Medicine and Health Sciences
  - Bachelor of Public Health
- Faculty of Sharia and Law
  - Bachelor of General Figh
  - Bachelor of Usul-fiqhi
  - Bachelor of Al-kitab & Sunnah
  - Bachelor of Law
- Faculty of Education
  - Bachelor of Islamic studies & Arabic language
  - Bachelor of Social science (History/Geography)
  - Bachelor of Sciences (Bio/Ch & Math/Phy)

== Memberships ==
- Somali Research and Education Network (SomaliREN)
- Association of African Universities (AAU)
- Arab States Research and Education Network (ASREN)
- Association of Somali Universities

== Partnerships ==
- Kenyatta University, Kenya
- Makerere University, Uganda
- Islamic University In Uganda, Uganda
- Kampala University, Uganda

== Accreditation ==
Kismayo University is registered as a private, non-profit higher education institution under the Ministry of Education, Higher Education and Culture (Somalia).
