= Goob Weyn =

Goob Weyn Goobweyn
- Village
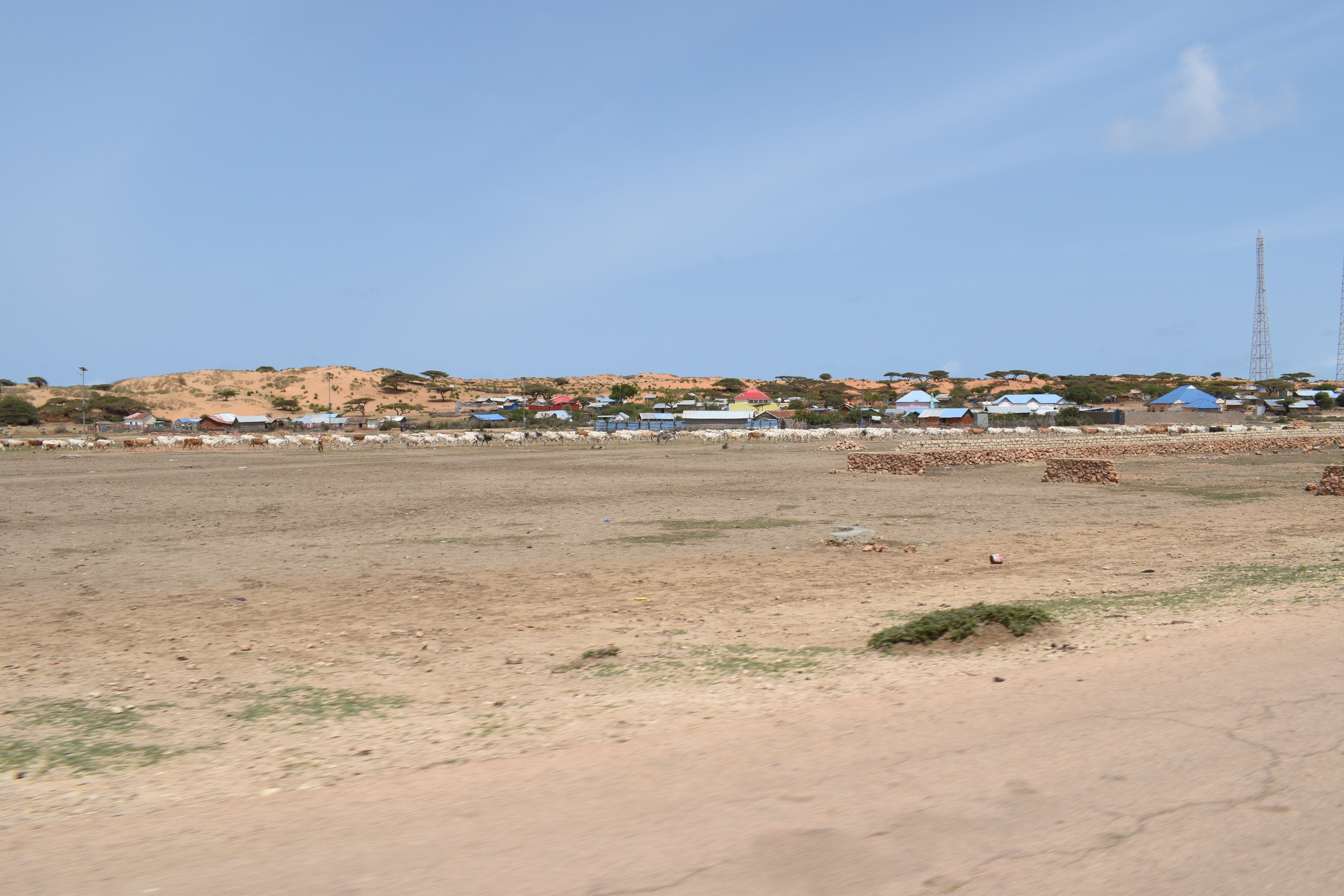
- Village circa 2021

- Location in Somalia.
- Coordinates: 00°14′58″N 42°36′08″E
- Country: Somalia
- Region: Lower Juba
- District: Kismayo District

Area
  - Land: 1 km^{2} (0.39 sq mi)
- Elevation: 3 m (9.8 ft)
- Time zone: UTC+3 (EAT)

Goob Weyn (Somali: Goobweyn) is a village in the southern Lower Juba region of Somalia, where Juba river meets the indian ocean.

== Geography ==
Goobweyn is situated on the banks of the Jubba River, and is only 3 meters above sea level. The village is primarily settled by the sheekhaal clan and is situated next to Kismayo National Park, and only 15 kilometers outside of Kismayo.

== Exports and livelihood ==
A primarily agricultural based town on the Jubba Basin, residents of Goobweyn primarily depend on agricultural exports to the nearby city of Kismayo, like tomatoes, onions, and coconuts.

In 1974, the area saw an influx of refugees following The Lingering Drought (Somali: Abaartii Dabadheer) in northern Somalia and the Somali region of Ethiopia.The refugees were introduced to ways of fishing and farming compared to the pastoralist livestock herding way of life.

== Gallery ==
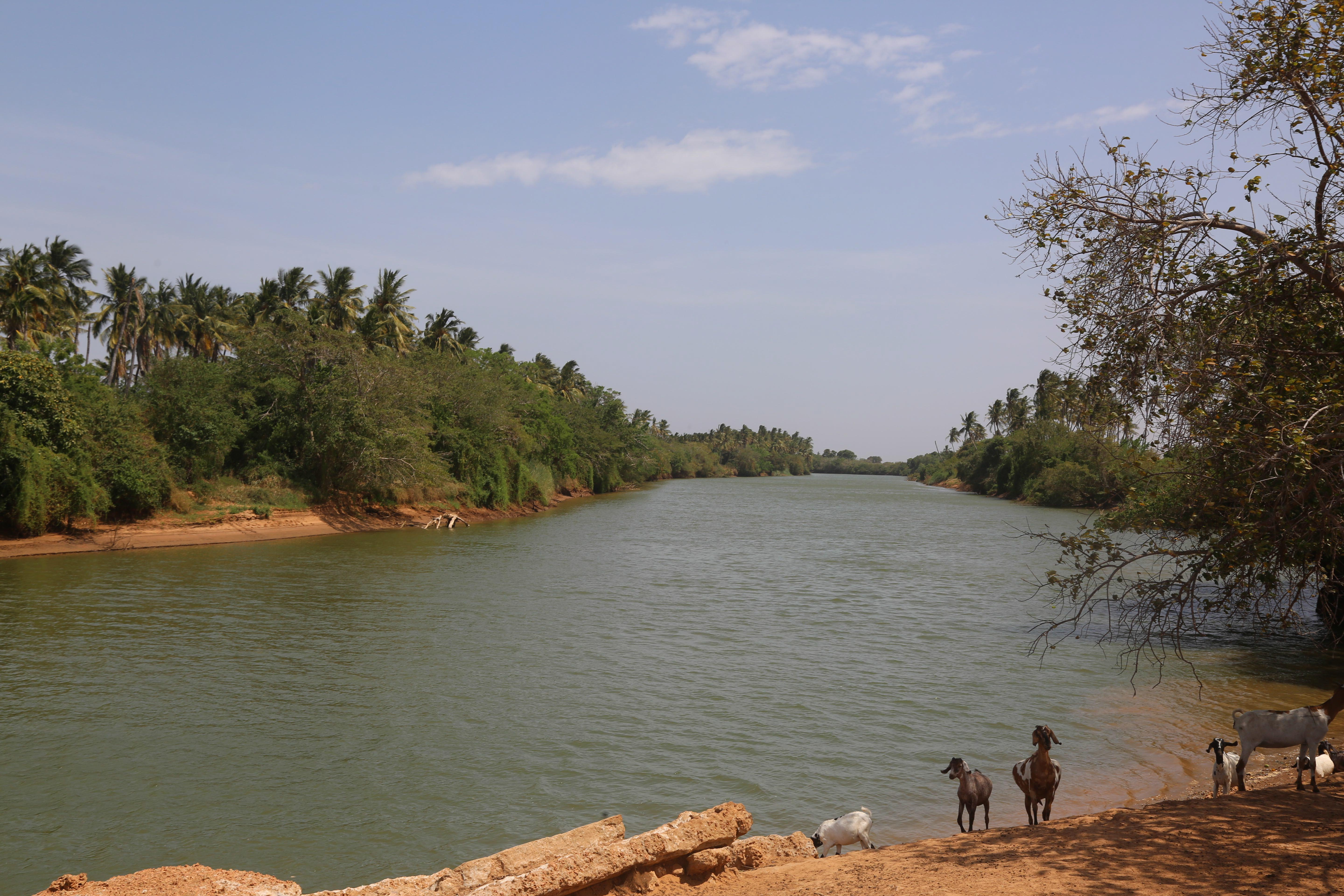
The Jubba river near Goobweyn

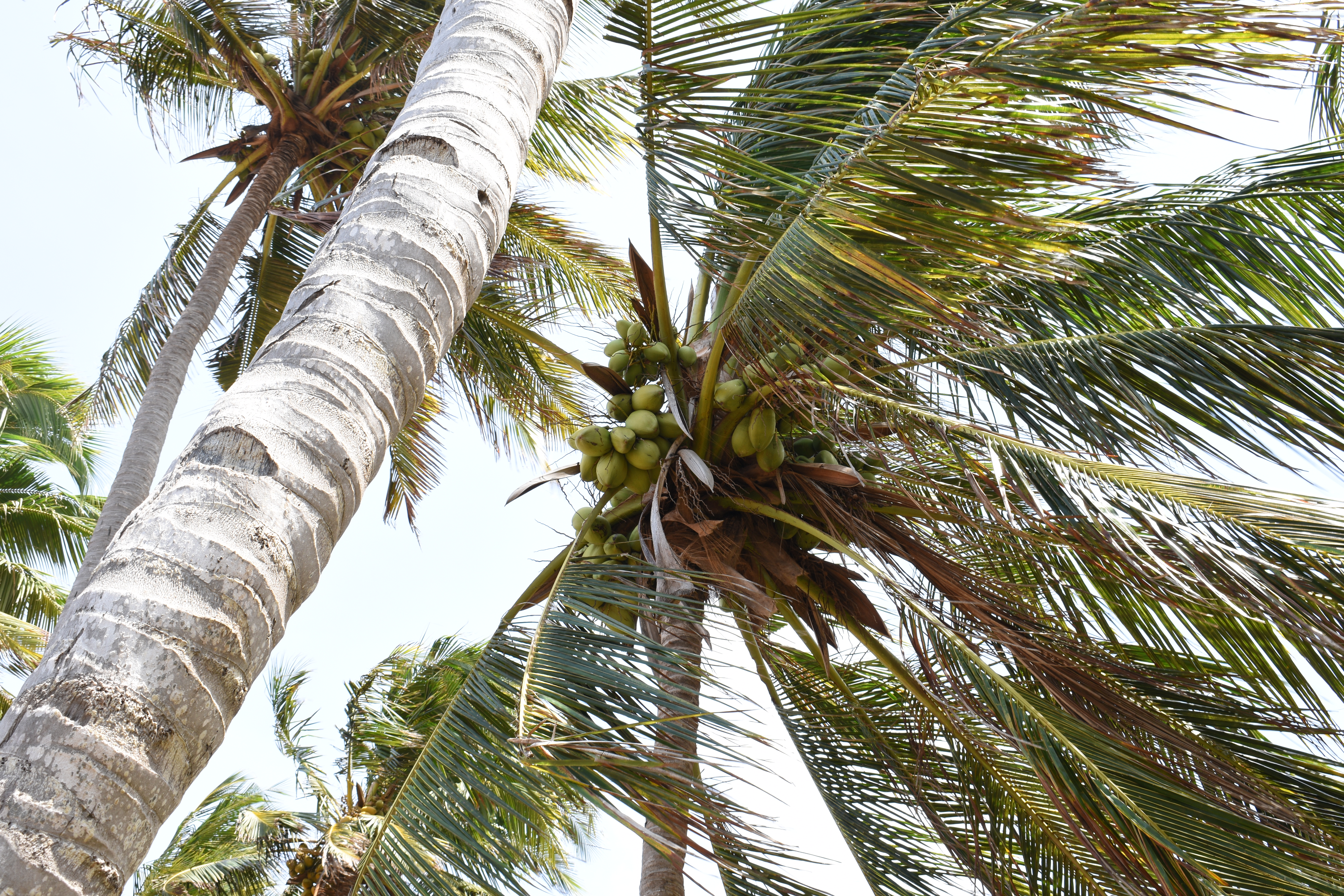
Coconut tree on the banks of the Jubba River near Goobweyn
