= Xagar =

Xagar can refer to:

- Xagar (Tibet), a village in Tibet
- Xagar District, a district in Somalia
