= Kaam-Jaroon =

Town in Lower Juba Region

Kaam Jaroon Kaam Jaroon (Somali)
- Town
- Country: Somalia
- Region: Lower Juba
- Elevation: 127 m (417 ft)

Population
  - Total: 35,000
- Time zone: UTC+3 (EAT)
- Area code: +252

Kaam-Jaroon is a town located in the Lower Juba (Jubbada Hoose) region of southern Somalia. It sits approximately 60 kilometers northwest of the coastal city of Kismayo and inland from the area around Jamaame bordering Kenya and the Indian Ocean.

The town is situated in a rural area known for livestock grazing and access to water resources, factors that contribute to its local economic importance.

== History ==
The town has been mentioned in reports concerning military operations involving the Somali National Army (SNA), Jubaland forces, and Al-Shabaab militants. The locality became more widely known in Somali media through reports of security operations conducted in the area during the Somali Civil War and the ongoing insurgency in southern Somalia.

The surrounding area has been described as strategically important because of its remote geography, distance from major urban centers, and availability of water and grazing land. Analysts and Somali media reports have noted that such conditions have allowed Al‑Shabaab militants to maintain a presence in parts of Lower Juba.

In July 2024, Somali state media reported that Danab commandos of the Somali National Army carried out operations against Al-Shabaab militants in the Kaam-Jaroon area of Lower Juba.

In May 2025, Somali government and regional forces reportedly conducted further military operations in and around Kaam‑Jaroon targeting Al‑Shabaab positions.

== Civilian impact ==
Residents of Kaam‑Jaroon have been affected by the broader conflict in Lower Juba. Reports from local residents and Somali media have described civilian casualties and displacement associated with military operations and aerial bombardments in the area. Verification of casualty figures remains difficult because of limited independent access to the region.

== Security ==
Like many rural towns in Lower Juba, Kaam-Jaroon has experienced instability linked to the insurgency carried out by Al-Shabaab in southern Somalia.

== Economy ==
The local economy is primarily based on pastoralism and livestock production, which are common economic activities throughout Lower Juba.

== See also ==
- Lower Juba
- Jubaland
- Al-Shabaab (militant group)
