= Operation Linda Nchi =

Kenyan military operation (2011–2012)

- Part of the Somali Civil War (2009–present) and the Somali–Kenyan conflict
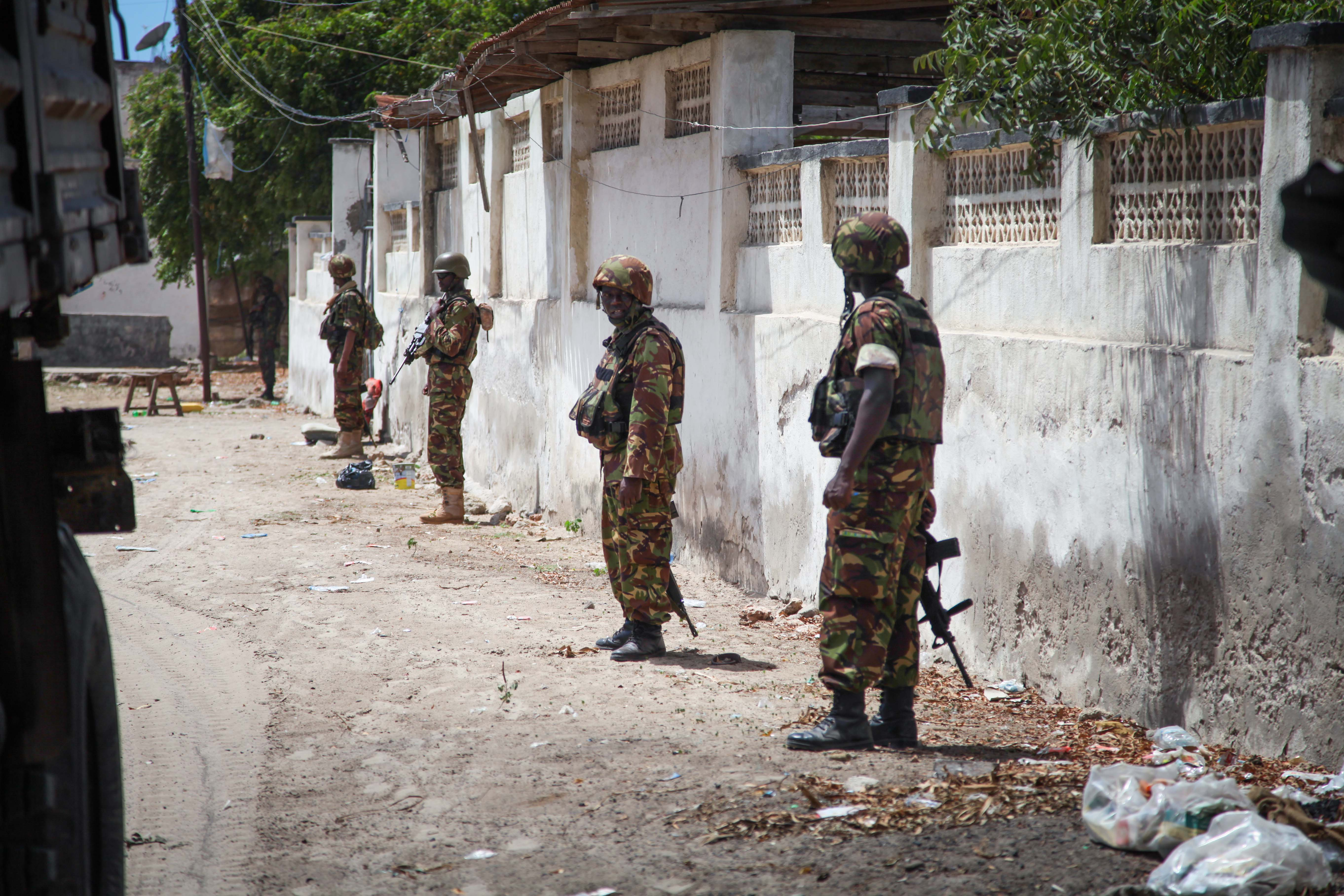
Date	16 October 2011 – 31 May 2012 (7 months, 2 weeks and 1 day)
Location	Somalia
Result	Operational success
Territorial changes	Capture of Qoqani, Kolbio, Fafadun, Elade, Hosingo, Badhadhe Afmadow, Tabda, Ras Kamboni, Burgabo, Busar, Hayo

Belligerents
Kenya (Somalia) TFG; Raskamboni Front; ASWJ; Azania	Al-Shabaab

Commanders and leaders
(Kenya) Julius Karangi (Kenya) Leonard Ngondi (Kenya) Mohamed Yusuf Haji (Somalia) Hussein Arab Isse Ahmed Madobe	Ibrahim al-Afghani; Mukhtar Robow; Hassan Turki Sheikh Aweys

Strength
Kenya: More than 6,000 security personnel at peak, including police	Al-Shabaab: Total size of 3,000 "hard-core fighters", 2,000 "allied militants" at end of 2012

Casualties and losses
Total: 21–72 killed, 152 injured: 10–31 Somali (TFG) militia killed, 128 injured; 13 KDF soldiers killed, 21 injured; 3 Ras Kamboni militants killed, 3 injured; 67 allied forces killed (Note: Casualties and losses according to Al-Shabaab) One Harbin Z-9 destroyed (mechanical failure) One patrol boat damaged.	Total: 700 militants killed, (KDF claim) 61 captured (Note: Casualties and losses according to Kenyan military)
- 20 civilians killed (Somalia) 30 civilians killed, 6 policemen killed and 17 security forces injured (Kenya)

Operation Linda Nchi (Swahili: Linda Nchi, lit. 'Protect the Country') was the Kenya Defence Forces' invasion of southern Somalia beginning in 2011. The Kenyan government declared the operation completed in March 2012, but its forces then joined AMISOM in Somalia.

The Kenyan government aimed to create a buffer zone between Al-Shabaab and instability in southern Somalia, and the Kenyan homeland. However, at a deeper level, the Kenyans desired "to be seen as a reliable partner in the U.S.-led 'global war on terrorism', there were institutional interests within the KDF, and key political elites within the Kenyan government, notably Minister for Internal Security George Saitoti, the Defence Minister Yusuf Haji and several senior security chiefs, advocated for intervention to advance their own economic and political interests."

== Background ==
During the Ethiopian invasion of Somalia aimed at toppling the Islamic Courts Union administration, Kenyan troops assisted the Ethiopians and allied Somali forces in capturing the retreating Somali Islamists. Al-Shabaab viewed the Kenyan government with hostility ever since. During the early 2007 fighting between the Somali Islamists and the Ethiopians, Kenyan Defense Force (KDF) were reported to have crossed the border by local residents in southern Somalia.

=== Lead up and planning ===
After Ethiopian troops withdrew from Somalia in early 2009, Al-Shabaab came to control much of the south. In March 2009 they accused Kenyan troops of crossing into Somalia and stated on their website, "Kenya has been making false allegations of facing danger from the border, and that is a great danger to the region's security and stability,"

The Kenyan government sought to carve out a buffer zone and puppet state in southern Somalia, the semi-autonomous Jubaland. According to a report by The Guardian:

Several sources agree...the Kenyan intervention plan was discussed and decided in 2010, then finalised with input from western partners, including the US and to a lesser extent France. Nairobi seems to have seized on kidnappings of foreign nationals by Somali groups on Kenyan territory as an excuse to launch an operation ready and waiting.

=== Invasion ===
In Kenya's incursion into southern Somalia started after a series of terrorist attacks in the country including the 13 October 2011 kidnapping of two aid workers who were working in the Dadaab refugee camp. The abductions were allegedly carried out by Al Shabaab militants. The Kenyan government claimed its troop deployment had received approval from the Transitional Federal Government of Somalia (TFG). Kenya's Foreign Affairs Minister, Moses Wetangula, stated that the deployment of Kenyan troops was at the request of the TFG. The Kenyan military said that there was no set exit date for the operation, but the indicator of the mission's success would be a crippling of Al-Shabaab's capacity.

On 16 October 2011, Reuters reported that Somali and Kenyan military officials had met over the weekend in the town of Dhobley, in Somalia, on the Kenya border. According to an unidentified security source, "the meeting was to prepare a joint operation between the two forces ... to launch an offensive against Al-Shabaab rebels who are scattered in different parts of southern Somalia".

The same day, an unnamed Somali military commander said that Kenyan troops had crossed the border and, in a joint operation with Somali forces, pushed Al Shabaab out of two bases near the Kenya border. Abdi Yusuf, a senior Somali military commander, confirmed that two warplanes had attacked Al Shabaab bases, but did not confirm their origin. He noted: "I can't identify the military aircraft, but our neighbour Kenya is fully supporting us militarily and our mission is to drive Al-Shabaab out of the region". Somalia's ambassador to Kenya, Mohamed Ali Nur, responded "We cannot condone any country crossing our border." TFG spokesman Abdirahman Omar Yarisow later contradicted Nur, asserting that "the governments of Somalia and Kenya are now cooperating in the fight against Al-Shabaab."

On 27 October Kenyan government spokesman Alfred Mutua said Linda Nchi was planned months in advance and had been "going on for quite some time", as well as denied any participation by western forces. The operation reportedly had a high approval rating from the Kenyan population.

== Discussions with Somali Transitional Federal Government ==
On 18 October, Somalia's President Sharif Sheikh Ahmed and other TFG officials hosted a Kenyan delegation in Mogadishu to discuss security co-operation against Al-Shabaab. Somalia's Defence Minister Hussein Arab Isse and Kenya's Defence Minister Mohamed Yusuf Haji then signed an agreement to collaborate against Al-Shabaab. Both countries pledged to "co-operate in undertaking security and military operations", including "co-ordinated pre-emptive action". The agreement reportedly restricted Kenyan activities to the southern Lower Juba region.

Despite media reports claiming otherwise, Kenyan Defence Minister Yusuf Haji denied the involvement of the Kenyan military in the capture by TFG forces of some Al-Shabaab bases in Lower Juba. He added that "Kenya trained more TFG troops in the past and they are battling now against al-Shabaab in southern Somalia regions and we are giving them both logistical and financial support." Somalia's Defence Minister Isse welcomed Kenya's participation, stating that Somalia "need[ed] the support of Kenya so that our forces will be able to end al-Shabaab or any other threats against both Kenya and Somalia".

=== Opposition to the pact ===
On 24 October, President Ahmed stated again that although he welcomed Kenyan logistical support, he was against the Kenyan military presence. These statements before the press appeared to contradict the signed cooperative agreement between the Somali and Kenyan Defence ministers on 18 October. Ahmed claimed his administration and people in Somalia opposed the presence of Kenyan troops since the Somali federal government "had no agreement with Kenya beyond helping us with logistics". According to media, Ahmed's remarks may have stemmed from fears that the Kenyan government supported the establishment of an autonomous Jubaland in the south of Somalia. Ahmed had reportedly previously protested the deployment of 2500 Somalis trained in Kenya to southern Somalia, arguing that the forces be sent to Mogadishu to support the TFG there.

Prime Minister of Somalia Abdiweli Mohamed Ali reportedly disowned any pact that the Somali authorities had with the Kenyan government to cross the border into Somalia, stating that "We do not have agreement with Kenya. We understand that we need to defend against the militants but there is no proof saying that we agreed with Kenya". He dismissed media reports suggesting he disagreed with the President. The two issued a joint statement on 27 October denying any agreement between the TFG and the Kenyan government to allow the Kenyan incursion into Somalia. In allusion to a cooperative agreement with the Kenyan government reached before the 18 October Mogadishu pact, Somali Defence Minister Isse also indicated that "the Somali Government and the Kenyan ministers only agreed to tackle the fighting against Al-Shabaab jointly by Kenya supporting the Somali forces."

The opposition to Kenya's action was criticised by some other TFG officials, militia allied to the TFG, and many ordinary Somalis. Many felt that Sharif did not fully understand the negative impact of Al-Shabaab's actions on the general public. Protests reportedly took place in the towns of Dhobley, Tabto and Qoqani, areas where Kenyan troops had passed through. His position reportedly conflicted with that of some Somali military and TFG officials, the latter of whom considered the deployment of Kenyan troops to be an extension of Kenya's support in ousting the Al-Shabaab rebels.

Two weeks after the operation began, on 31 October, a Somali delegation led by Prime Minister Ali met in Nairobi with Kenyan Premier Raila Odinga and other government officials to iron out differences and to outline a joint strategy on Operation Linda Nchi. After lengthy talks, the delegations issued a joint communique pledging co-ordinated military, political and diplomatic support for the mission, requesting that African Union Mission to Somalia (AMISOM) peacekeepers police areas captured from Al-Shabaab, and that the International Criminal Court (ICC) begin formal investigations against the group's commanders. The communique declared that "the Somalia government supports the activities of the Kenyan forces, which are being fully co-ordinated with the TFG of Somalia". Kenyan Premier Odinga took the opportunity to dispel media reports alleging that the Kenyan government supported plans to form an autonomous Jubaland region in southern Somalia. He said that the Somali and Kenyan governments would support the establishment of local administrations in liberated areas according to domestic consensus. In addition, Somali Prime Minister Ali urged the international community to support the joint operation, and stated that the mission "would be led by Somali forces with support of Kenyan forces". The two delegations also formed a joint "high-level co-ordinating committee" to maintain regular contacts between their respective governments.

== Intergovernmental Authority on Development ==
On 17 November, Somalia's President Sharif Ahmed met in Nairobi with Kenyan President Mwai Kibaki and Ugandan President Yoweri Museveni (who had Ugandan troops in Somalia as part of AMISOM). On 18 November, Voice of America reported that an alliance of countries in East Africa were planning a broader joint military campaign to quash Al-Shabaab. An Intergovernmental Authority on Development (IGAD) meeting slated for 25 November would reportedly urge all member nations, including Ethiopia, to contribute troops to the operation. Ethiopian officials indicated that no decision had officially been reached with regard to joining the troop contributing nations. However, Foreign Ministry spokesman Dina Mufti stated that "You can simply guess Ethiopia is going to be part and parcel of this process[...] The decision is not made as to sending the army, but per the IGAD council's resolutions of the past months, all IGAD member countries, the African Union and others also will be summoned, will be called, will be expected to somehow contribute something to strengthening the operations in Somalia."

== End ==
In March 2012, Colonel Cyrus Oguna [Kenya] said that Operation Linda Nchi was about to end, as Kenyan troops were set to re-hat under the African Union Mission in Somalia. On 31 May 2012, the BBC reported that Kenyan soldiers, acting as AMISOM's southern contingent, assisted Somali government forces in capturing Afmadow from Al-Shabaab, a southern town considered important in the military campaign owing to its network of roads that grant access to many different parts of the country. Kenyan forces were officially integrated into AMISOM in early June.

While Kenyan government officials declared a formal end to the operation in 2012, Kenyan military activities continued in Somalia within the framework of other, continuing operations. Kenyan forces remain in Somalia and are not expected to leave before 2020.

== Belligerents ==
=== Kenya ===
According to the Associated Press, Kenya had not "actively engaged" in the conflict in southern Somalia prior to this operation. According to a correspondent with The Independent, Kenya had previously been supporting at least two militias in southern Somalia in a proxy war against Al-Shabaab, but moved instead to a direct presence of Kenyan troops once that strategy had failed. Kenya's military is regarded as inexperienced and reporters voiced doubts that it has the capacity to conduct the required logistical operations. A joint communique issued on 31 October by the Kenyan and Somali governments stated that the Kenyan forces were fully co-operating with Somali forces in a TFG led operation.

An African Union initiative called for the Kenyan soldiers to eventually be brought under AMISOM's command. On 12 November, the Kenyan government released a statement announcing that it had approved the re-hatting of its Kenya Defence Forces under AMISOM. Analysts expect the additional AU troop reinforcements to help the Somali authorities gradually expand their territorial control.

In February 2012, the International Crisis Group reported that the Kenya Defence Forces "divulges little about which and how many forces are involved, though prior to January, it appears to have been less than 2,000", or two battalions. According to the Center for Strategic and International Studies, the two battalions, which crossed into Somalia on 16 October 2011, numbered 2,400 troops. Writing in 2015, academics David Anderson and Jacob McKnight stated that at the operation's peak "more than 6,000 security personnel were deployed, including the Kenya Police and its General Service Unit, the Administration Police (another paramilitary unit), and units from the Kenya Air Force".

=== Al-Shabaab ===
The Al-Shaabaab Islamist group is the main target of the operation. Al-Shabaab officially denied involvement in any of the kidnappings. Sheikh Ali Mohamud Rage, a spokesman for the group, said that its fighters would attack Kenya unless the Kenyan troops are withdrawn. He also claimed that bombardment by Kenyan aircraft had caused damage to infrastructure and civilian casualties. According to Al Jazeera, Al-Shabaab have attempted to capitalise on the incursion by depicting itself as a resistance force fighting foreign occupiers and urged local residents to take up arms against the Kenyan soldiers. According to the Kenyan government, the organisation is supported by Eritrea.

=== Somalia ===
On 18 October, President of Somalia Sharif Ahmed and other TFG officials hosted a Kenyan delegation in Mogadishu where Somalia's Defence Minister Hussein Arab Isse and Kenya's Minister of Defence Mohamed Yusuf Haji agreed to collaborate against Al-Shabaab. On 24 October, Ahmed again stated that although he welcomed Kenyan logistical support, he was against the Kenyan military presence, contradicting the agreement made on the 18th. He and the Somali Prime Minister Abdiweli Mohamed Ali issued a joint statement on 27 October denying any agreement between the TFG and Kenyan government to allow the Kenyan incursion into Somalia, a stance criticised by other TFG officials. A joint communique issued on 31 October by the Prime Ministers of Somalia and Kenya on behalf of their respective governments noted "the current operations are being led by the TFG of Somalia Forces with the support of the Kenyan Defence Forces".

=== United States ===
According to The Washington Post, the United States Air Force has been sharing surveillance data with the Kenyan military that it gathered via unarmed MQ-9 Reaper unmanned aerial vehicles (UAVs) flying out of Arba Minch in southern Ethiopia. The UAVs have been used for monitoring military activities in southern Somalia, and also can be armed with missiles and laser-guided bombs.

=== Eritrea ===
The United Nations has consistently accused Eritrea of aiding Al-Shabaab. In early November 2011, media reports also claimed that the Eritrean government had sent two plane-loads of arms to Al-Shabaab insurgents in southern Somalia. Eritrea's Foreign Minister issued a press release dismissing the charges as "pure fabrication and outright lies", and suggested that the reports were part of a "disinformation campaign" with the intended effect of discrediting Eritrea.

On 3 November, Kenyan Foreign Minister Moses Wetangula met with the Eritrean ambassador to Kenya to seek clarification on intelligence allegations that weapons were being flown to Al-Shabaab from Eritrea. Wetangula later told the press on 11 November that Kenya would consider "reviewing diplomatic ties" with Eritrea if the Eritrean government did not provide a satisfactory account of the situation.

On 12 November, Eritrea's envoy to Nairobi Beyene Russom told the press that his government had no objections vis-a-vis Operation Linda Nchi. He blamed the allegations that Eritrea was supplying weapons to Al-Shabaab on lack of due diligence on the part of the media. Russom also accused Ethiopia, stating that "We have nothing against Kenya. This piling up of accusations is the work, as we believe, of Ethiopia to camouflage its illegal military occupation of Eritrean territory. What is being said now about the planeload of weapons to Al-Shabaab again we believe is a creation of Ethiopia." With regard to Wetangula's warning that the Kenyan government would sever ties, Russom indicated that Asmara believed the Kenyan authorities were acting on false information. Eritrea's Foreign Minister Osman Saleh Mohammed is scheduled to arrive in Nairobi for talks on the issue.

On 5 December, the United Nations Security Council imposed tougher sanctions on Eritrea due to its reported role in providing support to the Al-Shabaab militants. Observers and members of the allied forces subsequently expressed optimism that the long-standing civil conflict in southern Somalia would soon be resolved. Colonel Felix Kulayigye, a spokesman for AMISOM's Ugandan military contingent, indicated that "Normally, sanctions are supposed to reduce the capability of the affected country in its financial muscle. And, therefore, if Eritrea faces sanctions, if they are comprehensive enough, that means it will have not a spare penny to spend on negative elements". Political analyst Sheikh Abdisamad, the chairman of the research organisation Southlink, also suggested that "If the sanctions become effective on Eritrea, what I'm sure is that they can easily defeat those militia within Somalia" since sanctions would disrupt flights funnelling supplies to Al-Shabaab along the "Eritrean route" between Asmara in Eritrea and Kismayo in southern Somalia. Girma Asmerom, Eritrea's Ambassador to the AU, responded that the sanctions on his country would have a negative effect on both Eritrea's development and that of the larger East Africa region. He also indicated that he would not wish such restrictions on other nations, describing the United Nations' sanctions as "illegal and unjust".

Pundits have suggested that Eritrea's involvement in the Somali conflict, its reported support of Al-Shabaab and earlier alleged backing of the Islamic Courts Union (ICU), are part of a "proxy war" against Ethiopia. According to Emmanuel Kisiangani, a senior researcher with the South Africa-based Institute for Security Studies, "Eritrea has had differences with Ethiopia over the Badme border region, which the Court of Arbitration at The Hague awarded to Eritrea, a decision which Ethiopia has not respected[...] It all boils down to the two actors supporting different parties. It is only that Ethiopia has played its cards well and what it does is acceptable to the international community." Eritrean ambassador Girma indicated that the Eritrean authorities "have never thought to destabilize any of the countries because they are our potential markets, they are our assets, we want a strong, viable Ethiopia". He also dismissed the charges that Eritrea is offering assistance to Al-Shabaab as "lies and deceptions", adding that Eritrea has not supported the group and would never do so.

== Military events ==
Map of the Somali Civil War from 2011 to February 2013

On 17 October, media reported that Somali TFG forces had taken control of the town of Qoqani. Kenyan air support reportedly assisted in the battle, with attack helicopters bombarding Al-Shabaab positions. Some reports also suggested involvement by the United States military, though Somali and Kenyan officials alluded only to Kenyan participation in the clash. TFG spokesman Abdirahman Omar Osman indicated that Kenyan troops were only supplying "logistical and moral support" and that Somali military officers were actually combating the Islamist militants. The number of casualties is unknown.

One Z-9 helicopter is reported to have been lost due to mechanical failure while undertaking support operations in Liboi town. 5 Kenyan soldiers died in the crash. The operation reportedly involves "truckloads" of soldiers, helicopters, and warplanes. At least two Kenyan battalions of 800 men each have been committed to the campaign.

A car bomb exploded in Mogadishu as Kenyan ministers visited the capital on 18 October, leaving at least two people dead and 15 injured. On 24 October, French media reported that the Somali army and Kenyan troops were advancing toward the southern town of Afmadow, with the eventual aim of seizing Kismayo from the Islamists. Eyewitnesses report that Al-Shabaab had confiscated trucks to bring fresh troops to Afmadow and started building an entrenchment system.

Early on 24 October, a Russian made F1 grenade was detonated in the Mwauras disco in Kenya's capital Nairobi. The detonation injured 14 people. The local police linked the attack to Al-Shabaab. It was followed by a second attack that evening against a bus stop. The second attacked killed at least one person and injured eight. A suspect was arrested and pleaded guilty for both attacks. He said that he is a member of Al-Shabaab. Identified by the media as Elgiva Bwire Oliacha (alias Mohamed Seif), a recent Kenyan Muslim convert, he was sentenced to life in prison after having pleaded guilty. The man reportedly smiled at cameras, stated that he harboured no regrets, and indicated that he would not appeal his sentence.

According to Somali military officials, air-strikes bombed targets in the southern town of Kismayo, an Al-Shabaab stronghold. Although the origin of the assault jet could not be determined, French media have speculated that it could belong to the French military. Al-Shabaab said that the attack has caused no casualties.

On 27 October, four civilians were killed when their car was attacked by unidentified assailants near the Kenyan-Somali border in Mandera. It is, however, unclear whether Al-Shabaab was behind the attack.

On 28 October, a Kenyan military convoy was ambushed by Al-Shabaab militants between the towns of Tabda and Bilis Qoqani in southern Somalia. Assisting Somali federal troops, the convoy was positioned 60 kilometres (37 mi) from the border, on the Kismayo route, According to the BBC, the ambush represents the Kenyan troops' first confrontation with Al-Shabaab insurgents and reportedly lasted 30 minutes. A spokesman for the Kenyan military told the press that the attack left nine Al-Shabaab fighters dead and two Kenyan soldiers injured. Abdul Asis Abu Muscab, a spokesman for the group, also indicated that the ambush represented the beginning of the fighting and that further attacks would ensue.

On 30 October, Kenyan Air Force fighter jets bombed the town of Jilib, killing 10 and injuring at least 45. Some of these were reported to be civilians. Kenya admitted conducting an air raid but blames Al-Shabaab for the death of the civilians. Kenya's Premier Raila Odinga said that civilian deaths were regrettable and any incidents would result in an investigation. However, he blamed Al-Shabaab for causing the civilian casualties by stating that an Al-Shabaab technical equipped with a machine gun, which was targeted during the air raid, drove into a civilian compound while burning and exploded, leading to civilian casualties.

On 31 October, TFG troops killed at least ten Al-Shabaab insurgents during clashes in Busar and Modaale, villages near the town of Elwak. TFG forces were reported to be nearing the port of Burgabo, 140 kilometres south of Kismayo. On 1 November the Kenyan military announced that it would attack ten Somali towns including Kismayo. By 2 November Al-Shabaab began conscripting residents to help defend the entrenched Kismayo, while at sea a skiff carrying fuel was sunk by the Kenyan navy killing 18 militants.

On 3 November, Kenyan military spokesman Emmanuel Chirchir warned Kenyan and Somali merchants via Twitter not to sell donkeys to Al-Shabaab, as the group has now "resorted to using donkeys to transport their weapons." He also cautioned the public that any "large concentration and movement of loaded donkeys will be considered an al-Shabab activity."

On 10 November, Al-Shabaab fighters ambushed a Kenyan convoy in between the towns of Tabda and Bills Qoqani. The fighting which started in the afternoon continued overnight and according to Al-Shabaab they managed to kill 30 Kenyan troops and destroy six Kenyan military trucks. The TFG, however, claimed only 21 soldiers had been killed and that only three trucks were destroyed, while four were captured by Al-Shabaab. Kenya's military spokesman Major Emmanuel Chirchir was, however, quick to deny the claims, and stated that Al-Shabaab had resorted to a propaganda campaign and categorically stated that the reports carried on Iranian press TV to be unsubstantiated and completely false. "Attention of the Ministry of State for Defence has been drawn to the influx of propaganda and false information in regards to the on-going operation in Somalia. The continued false reporting by Press TV and other like minded media is unacceptable and should not be taken as factual information and events," said Major Chirchir.

On 16 November, TFG and Kenyan forces attacked an Al-Shabaab base in Busar. An Al-Shabaab official alleged that his group had killed 8 and captured 3 allied soldiers during the battle. Kenyan military officials denied the claim, saying that the joint forces had killed 12 militants but incurred no casualties. Later that day, Al-Shabaab attacked Raskamboni movement positions in the town of Kulbio near Dobley.

On 19 November, Kenyan Colonel Cyrus Oguna told the press that information and intelligence volunteered by local residents in southern Somalia had greatly assisted Kenyan forces. He cited captured Al-Shabaab positions as a testimony to this fact, and suggested that more areas would be secured courtesy of this information. The volunteered intelligence had also reportedly helped the soldiers successfully manage a change in tactics by the Al-Shabaab militants, the latter of whom had reportedly resorted to disguising themselves as women to escape the joint Somali and Kenyan troops.

On 20 November, Kenyan forces assisted by warships reportedly destroyed an Al-Shabaab and Al-Qaeda training facility in Hola Wajeer, situated in Lower Juba's Badhadhe District. A military convoy of Somali and Kenyan troops was also ambushed in between the towns of Tabto and Dobley. According to a TFG official, the allied forces' casualties totalled one dead and several wounded TFG soldiers as well as a burned TFG vehicle, while 10 Al-Shabaab militants were killed.

On 21 November, Kenyan military spokesman Major Emmanuel Chirchir warned that the militants planned to release a video clip showing allegedly captured Kenyan soldiers being executed. He said this was part of the propaganda campaign against the operation. He said the relationship of the Kenyan and Somali military with the local people in the areas where Al-Shabaab have been flushed out continues to thrive. "Based on this, we received concrete information of an arms trade and Al-Shabaab infiltration which were countered successfully," he said in a statement.

On 31 December 2011, the TFG retook control of Beledweyne from the Al-Shabaab militants. Somali National Army (SNA) soldiers and around 3,000 allied Ethiopian army troops attacked the city in the early morning, capturing it after hours of fighting. Around 20 people were killed in the battle, mainly consisting of Ethiopian soldiers and Al-Shabaab insurgents.

At least 60 Al-Shabaab fighters were killed due to airstrikes by the Kenyan military on 7 January 2012, according to officials in Kenya, with a further 50 or so injured.

== Aftermath ==
On 28 September 2012, Kenyan AMISOM forces, assisted by forces from the Somali National Army and the Ras Kamboni militia, launched an amphibious offensive on Kismayo. Al-Shabaab forces withdrew from the city the next day, with the AMISOM forces later moving in.

In September 2013, the Westgate shopping mall shooting in Nairobi was reportedly in retaliation for the Kenyan troop presence in Somalia and followed Al-Shabaab warnings that it would attack.

== See also ==
- Drone strikes in Somalia
- Terrorism in Kenya
