= Gobo Kibir =

Town in Lower Juba Region

- Hamlet
- Location within Somalia
- Coordinates: 0.09864°S 42.36785°E
- Country: Somalia
- Federal Member State: Jubaland
- Region: Lower Juba
- Elevation: 12 m (39 ft)
- Time zone: UTC+3 (EAT)

Gobo Kibir is a small town located in the Lower Juba (Jubbada Hoose) region of southern Somalia. It lies approximately 30km west of Kismayo, the regional capital of Lower Juba. It is part of the Jubaland administrative region in southern Somalia. .

The locality lies within the Jubba River basin, a region characterized by semi-arid savanna and seasonal vegetation patterns.

== See also ==
- Lower Juba
- Jubaland
- Jubba River
