= Weyn =

Weyn may refer to:

- Goob Weyn, a town in the southern Lower Juba region of Somalia
- Mahaday Weyn, a district of the southeastern Middle Shebelle (Shabeellaha Dhexe) region in Somalia
- Suzanne Weyn (born 1955), American author
- Weyn Ockers (died 1568), Dutch Protestant sentenced to death
