= Environmental issues in Somalia =

Somalia continues to suffer from many environmental issues like land degradation and overfishing. Land degradation caused by overgrazing, soil erosion, loss of topsoil, and loss of vegetation due to the cutting of trees continues to effect Somalia's socio-political climate. Additionally, overfishing caused by a lack of government surveillance and foreign exploitation of Somali waters encourages piracy and terrorist activities along with exacerbating natural habitat destruction and climate change.

== Land degradation and deforestation ==
Land degradation in Somalia is becoming an increasingly important issue as approximately one-third of Somalia's arable land has degraded and lost its fertility. Land degradation in Somalia comes in a few major forms including soil erosion, loss of topsoil, the loss of vegetation due to overgrazing, and loss of vegetation due to the cutting of trees for the production of charcoal or for the use as construction materials. Soils are particularly prone to erosion in the East African Savanna as they are predominantly sands, sandy loams or black cracking clays that have a weak structural stability. Land degradation is a significant contributor to the decline of agricultural production. Additionally, the overuse and exploitation of the ecosystem in a quest to increase agricultural production leads to unintended land degradation. Agronomic practices such as the burning of animal manure and a general lack of soil and water conservation are major causes of the poor agricultural productivity of Somalia. Research has shown that as land degradation continues to worsen, rural poverty increases, which in turn causes social conflict and rural migration to urban centers. Between 1890 and 1960, the colonial governments in Somalia introduced legislation that marked some parts of northwest Somalia for crop cultivation. The colonial governments later altered the land ownership rights in these areas from communal to individual ownership. This legislation was enacted to increase food production, however, it later triggered land degradation in the area, because it was not supported with the necessary agricultural extension services. Following the colonial period, successive governments did not properly enforce colonial legislation leading to communities gradually beginning crop production on their own. By the mid-1980s, evidence of land degradation (e.g. loss of vegetation and topsoil loss) started emerging because of poor cropland management and agricultural extensification.

Another cause of land degradation in Somalia is socio-political upheaval. It has caused instability in the central government and a subsequent loss of focus in policy formulation and implementation with regard to land degradation. The upheaval and subsequent conflicts have contributed to the destruction of previously built soil and water conservation structures. The damaged structures were physically destroyed by either war or abandonment. Consequently, they no longer control land degradation and can contribute to downstream gully erosion in some locations.

=== Charcoal trade ===
The charcoal trade in Somalia is another factor that has contributed to land degradation in Somalia. It is traditionally one of Somalia's main economic activities. Before 1990, and the onset of the civil war, the charcoal trade was regulated by the central government through acts of parliament and via co-operative societies. However, this government control on charcoal manufacturing and consumption ceased with the collapse of the central government in the 1990s. Many tree species in the country have been lost due to the charcoal trade.

=== Tree cover extent and loss ===
Global Forest Watch publishes annual estimates of tree cover loss and 2000 tree cover extent derived from time-series analysis of Landsat satellite imagery in the Global Forest Change dataset. In this framework, tree cover refers to vegetation taller than 5 m (including natural forests and tree plantations), and tree cover loss is defined as the complete removal of tree cover canopy for a given year, regardless of cause.

For Somalia, country statistics report cumulative tree cover loss of 4,654 ha (46.54 km^{2}) from 2001 to 2024 (about 5.3% of its 2000 tree cover area). For tree cover density greater than 30%, country statistics report a 2000 tree cover extent of 87,128 ha (871.28 km^{2}). The charts and table below display this data. In simple terms, the annual loss number is the area where tree cover disappeared in that year, and the extent number shows what remains of the 2000 tree cover baseline after subtracting cumulative loss. Forest regrowth is not included in the dataset.

Annual tree cover loss in Somalia, 2001–2024. View chart definition.
Tree cover extent in 2000 minus cumulative tree cover loss in Somalia, 2001–2024 (loss-only residual; does not account for gain). View chart definition.

Annual tree cover extent and loss
Year	Tree cover extent (km2) (Note: This residual measure does not include forest regrowth.)	Annual tree cover loss (km2)
2001	867.88	3.40
2002	865.37	2.51
2003	864.32	1.05
2004	862.17	2.15
2005	859.46	2.71
2006	858.28	1.18
2007	855.57	2.71
2008	853.07	2.50
2009	849.99	3.08
2010	848.59	1.40
2011	846.75	1.84
2012	844.80	1.95
2013	841.64	3.16
2014	840.42	1.22
2015	839.75	0.67
2016	838.89	0.86
2017	835.85	3.04
2018	835.41	0.44
2019	831.67	3.74
2020	830.13	1.54
2021	828.44	1.69
2022	827.19	1.25
2023	826.15	1.04
2024	824.74	1.41

== Overfishing ==
Somalia has the longest coastline in Africa and a wealth of marine resources. However, weak governance, lack of infrastructure and illegal, unregulated and unreported (IUU) fishing by foreign countries have impeded Somali efforts to take full advantage of the economic potential of these resources. Furthermore, these causes have exacerbated overfishing and destruction of marine habitats. In Somalia and Tanzania, illegal trawlers "deploy giant, non-selective nets, wiping out entire schools of tuna, including the young ones, which they discard dead, ruining the marine ecosystem and contributing to climate change. Overfishing can have a range of impacts on the environment upsetting the delicate balance of marine food webs, ruining local economies, and leading ultimately to climate change as our oceans warm.

Overfishing, particularly by foreign vessels, was uncommon off the coast of East Africa and was very low on the international community's radar when the government of Somalia collapsed in the 1990s. The unique combination of rich fishing opportunities and a complete inability of the government to police its waters drew fleets from many countries, causing even further instability in the region. The greatest harm was done by European and Asian vessels that plundered the fisheries off Somalia's coast. After Somalia's fish populations were depleted, the international ships moved on. However, as a result of foreign overfishing, local economies along the coast collapsed, and many communities experienced joblessness and hunger. This led to individuals in the area deciding to exploit the minimal assets at their disposal and transform small fishing boats into pirate vessels. The beginning of marine piracy in the Somalia is dated to the early 90s when fishing communities off the coast of Puntland started to organize patrols to prevent and deter illegal fishing and the discharge of toxic wastes. The increase in piracy by fishermen who now lack their main source of sustenance due to illegal foreign overfishing has been mirrored by Al-Shabaab terrorist activity and profits from piracy have been used to fund terrorist activities. Though overfishing is not the sole cause of the increase in Somali piracy, it is undeniable that the pillaging of local fish populations, largely by foreign vessels, played a key role. Piracy in the Gulf of Aden and Indian Ocean off the Somali Coast reached unprecedented levels in 2008, with the number of attacks increasing 152 percent from 2007. Somali pirates hijacked 42 vessels in 2008, taking 815 hostages.
