= Bilis Qooqaani =

- Town
- Location in Somalia.
- Coordinates: 0°16′56″N 41°42′52″E
- Country: Somalia
- Region: Lower Juba

Population
  - Total: 55,000−80,000
- Time zone: UTC+3 (EAT)

Bilis Qooqaani is a town in the Afmadow district of the Lower Juba (Jubbada Hoose) region of southern Somalia.

The city sits approximately 70 kilometers from the Kenya-Somali border.

Bilis Qooqaani is similar to many towns in southern Somalia in terms of safety and lifestyle

== Economy ==
Animal husbandry is the primary occupation.

It is one of Somalia's poorest cities. The people endured hardships such as war and drought. The two-decade civil war virtually destroyed the livelihoods there and left behind high rates of illiteracy, disease, and poverty.

== Infrastructure ==
The offers two water sources: highly polluted boreholes.

== Health care ==
Malaria is common there and claims many lives, mostly women, children, and the elderly.

Women deliver babies in their houses with the help of midwives who lack the training and resources necessary to handle complications, costing many lives during labor.

According to a health assessment report done by the World Food Programme:

"The region is one of the most affected by the drought-induced humanitarian crises that has recently affected Southern Somalia. Health services are inadequate in Afmadow/Hagar with no proper functioning health facilities and so most inhabitants get assistance from private pharmacies. There is one MCH run by local Ngo Dinh Diem NGO in the area of Afmadow with basic medical kit supply from UNICEF. However, other areas have not a single public post. Referral cases including severely malnourished children have nowhere to seek assistance. Some residents therefore resort to self-prescription and medication."

The local community, in partnership with some members in the Somali diaspora, is striving to build a clinic in Qoqaani to provide maternity and general health care services. The clinic, which is currently run by two midwives, has only three beds and little other resources. The nearest medical facility (itself under-resourced) is about 30 miles away.
