= Jamame District =

Jamame
- District
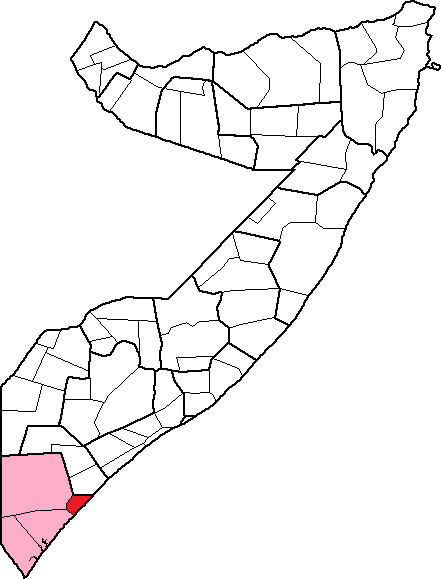
- Country: Somalia
- Region: Lower Juba
- Capital: Jamame
- Time zone: UTC+3 (EAT)

Jamame District (Somali: Degmada Jamaame) is a district in the southern Lower Juba (Jubbada Hoose) region of Somalia. Its capital lies at Jamame. The district is primarily inhabited by the, Bimaal people.
