= Jamame =

Jamame Giamama (Villaggio Regina Margherita)
- City
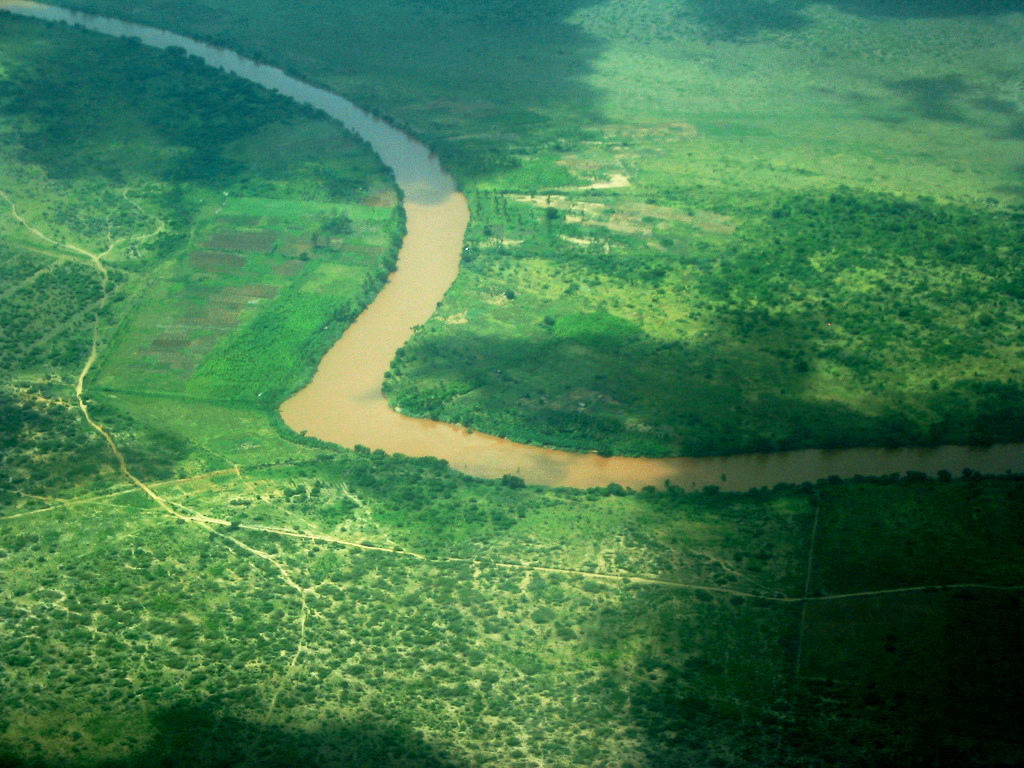
- The Juba River downstream from Jamame.

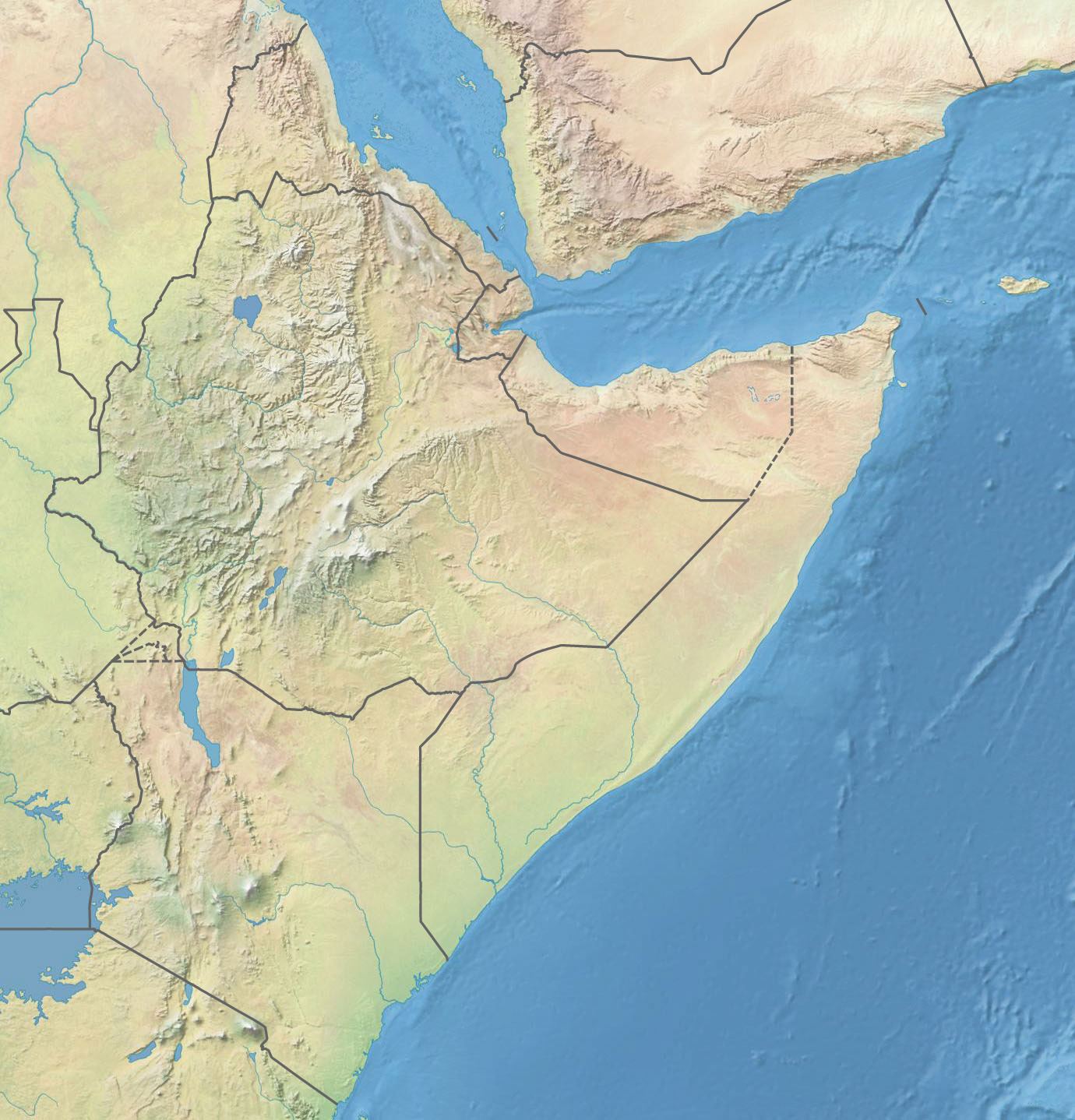
- Location within Somalia Location within the Horn of Africa Location within Africa
- Coordinates: 0.0702°N 42.7480°E
- Country: Somalia
- Region: Lower Juba
- District: Jamame

Government
  - Control: Al-Shabaab

Population (2005)
  - Total: 129,149
- Time zone: UTC+3 (EAT)

Jamame (Somali: Jamaame, Arabic: جمامة, Italian: Giamama, formerly Villaggio Regina Margherita), also spelled Giamame, is a town in the southern Lower Juba (Jubbada Hoose) region of Somalia. There are many farms located near Jamame. The equator passes over the town.

== Overview ==
Jamame is situated between the Somali Sea in the east, the agricultural land along the Jubba River in the west, and 53 kilometres (33 mi) from the port city of Kismayo to the southwest. It is the center of the Jamame District.

Jamaame Airstrip is about 1 kilometre (0.62 mi) to the south of the town.

In 2005, Jamame had a population of around 129,149 inhabitants according to the UNDP.

== History ==
Since 2014, the Al-Shabaab Al-Mujahideen has controlled Jamaame. In June 2018, American Special Forces and Al-Shabaab fighters engaged in a firefight near Jamame, which killed one American soldier.

The Guardian reported that on 15 November 2025 a US airstrike targeting Al-Shabaab killed at least 12 civilians in Jamame, including eight children. A resident reported that a school and at least 18 homes were destroyed. The newspaper reported that it was the largest number of innocent people killed by the United States intervention in Somalia in a single incident in Somalia for 18 years, but no investigation appeared to have taken place.
