= Afmadow District =

- District
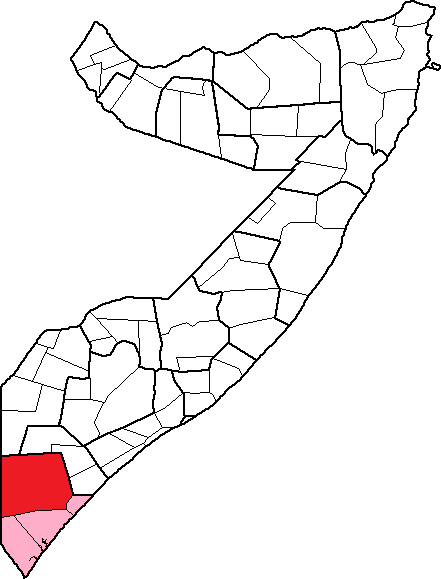
- Afmadow District
- Country: Somalia
- Region: Lower_Juba
- Capital: Afmadow
- Time zone: UTC+3 (EAT)

Afmadow is a district in Lower Jubba of Somalia. The district capital is Afmadow. It was first established as a town in 1896.
