= Port of Kismayo =

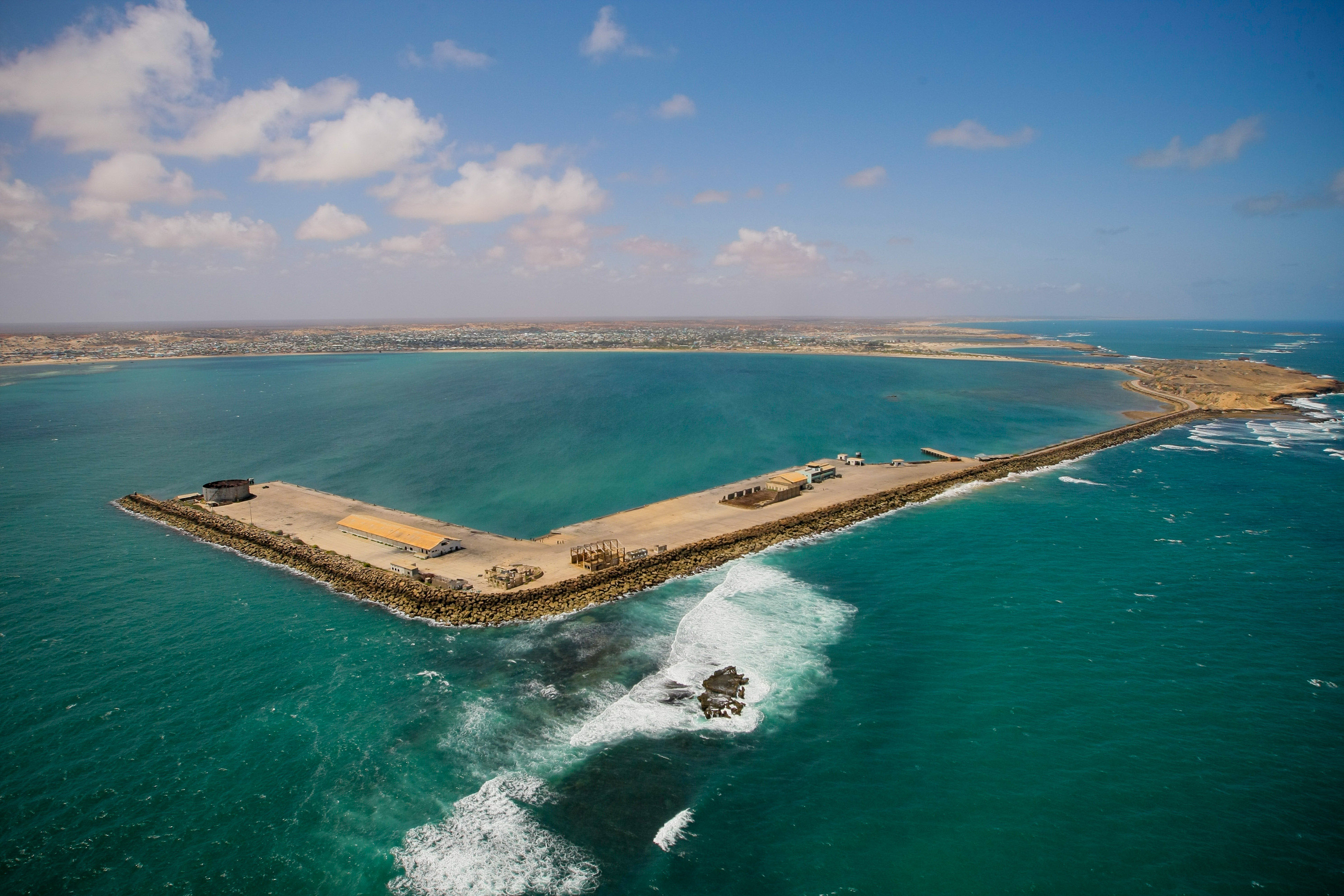
- The port as of 2012
- Interactive map of Port of Kismayo

Location
- Country: Somalia
- Location: Kismayo
- Coordinates: 00°21′29″S 042°32′43″E
- UN/LOCODE: SOKMU

Details
- Operated by: Jubbaland

The Port of Kismayo (Somali: Dekada Kismaayo, Italian: Porto di Chisimaio), also known as the Kismayo Port, is the official seaport of Kismayo, situated in southern Somalia. It is classified as a major class port. It has a harbour as well as a pier which juts into the Somali Sea.

== Roots ==
The natural anchorage in the vicinity of Kismayo possibly corresponds with the ancient emporium of Nikon, mentioned in the Periplus of the Erythraean Sea by Arrian of the 1st century CE. The term Kismayo itself is a compound portmanteau derived from the Somali terms kis, meaning somewhat small, and mayo, meaning not.

== Overview ==
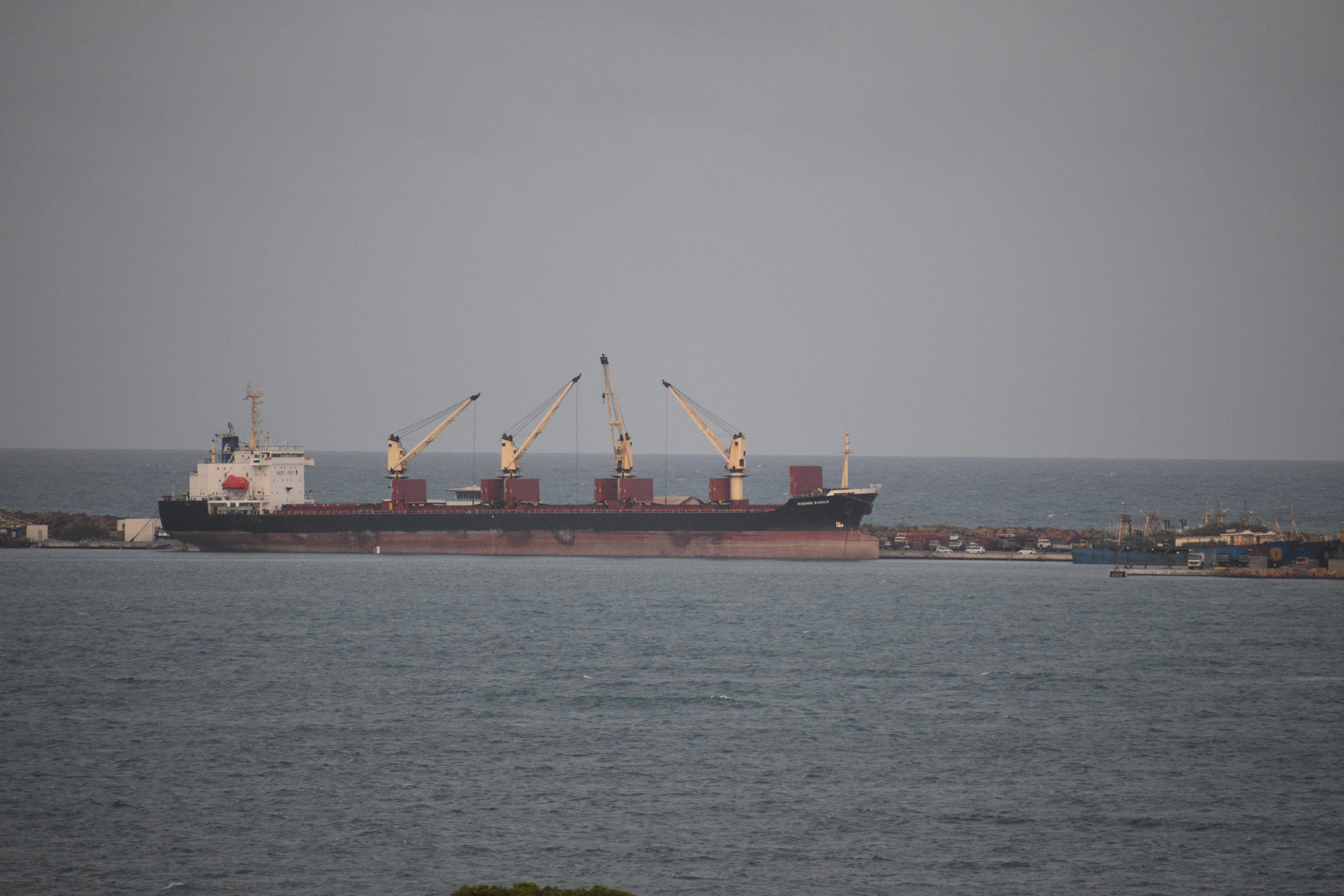
Bulk carrier Rising Eagle at Kismayo Port, 10 August 2021.

Kismayo's large docks are situated on a peninsula on the Somali Sea coast. Formerly one of the Bajuni Islands, the peninsula was subsequently connected by a narrow causeway when the modern Port of Kismayo was built in 1964 with U.S. assistance. In 1966 the CIA's Intelligence Handbook for Special Operations – Somali Republic described the port as mainly an outlet for bananas and other agricultural produce. Only vessels of "very shallow draft" could be accommodated; deep-water ships had to be served by lighters in the open roadstead. Four protected berths to serve 10,000 ton vessels with drafts of up to 31 feet were part of a port expansion programme. A power plant, water system, and handling equipment were to be constructed by 1967.

The port served as a base for the Somali Navy as well as the Soviet Navy after the 1969 Somali coup d'état. Somalia and the United States jointly refurbished the port in 1984 after significant wear to the 2,070-foot-long (630 m) four-berth, marginal wharf at the harbor required major renovations to maintain operations.

The Port of Kismayo was officially brought under the Juba Interim Administration in August 2013. Per agreement, management of the facility was scheduled to be transferred to the Somali Federal Government after a period of six months. Revenues and resources generated from the seaport will, like the Kismayo airport, be earmarked for Jubaland's service delivery and security sectors as well as local institutional development.

== See also ==
- Transportation in Somalia
