= Kismayo District =

Kismayo
- District
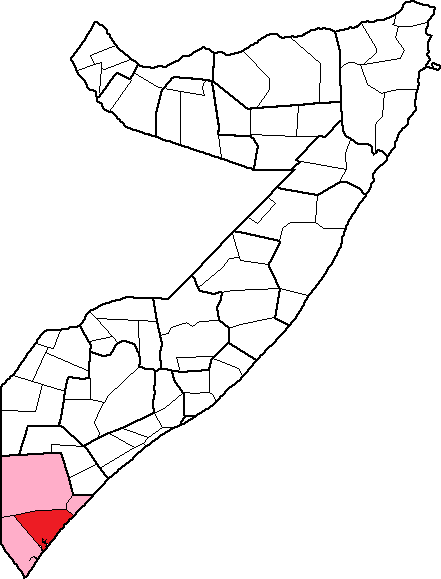
- Country: Somalia
- Region: Jubbada Hoose
- Capital: Kismayo

Population (2005)
  - Total: 166,667
- Time zone: UTC+3 (EAT)

Kismayo District (Somali: Degmada Kismayo) is a district in the southern Jubbada Hoose region of Somalia. Its capital is Kismayo.
