= Xagar District =

District in Somalia

Coordinates: 00°52′02″N 41°58′16″E

Xagar District is an administrative district in southern Somalia. It is one of five districts that make up the Jubbada Hoose region.
