= Afmadow =

Town in lower jubba, Somalia

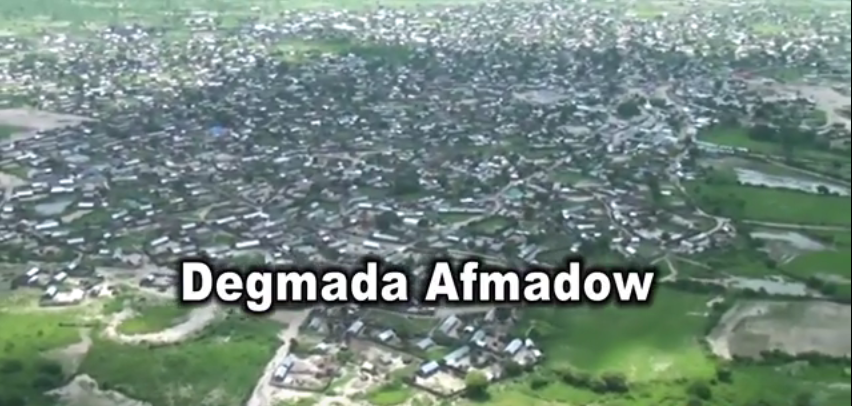
- An overview of Afmadow taken by satellite

- Location in Somalia
- Coordinates: 0°30′56″N 42°4′24″E
- Country: Somalia
- Somalia: Jubaland
- District: Afmadow District

Area
  - Total: 27 sq mi (70 km^{2})

Population
  - Estimate (2011): 90,000−170,000
- Time zone: UTC+3 (EAT)

Afmadow (Somali: Afmadoow) is a city in southern Somalia, located in the middle of the Juba region and bordered by Kenya, Badhadhe, Kismayo, Jamame, Jilib, Hagar, Bardhere and Elwaq in Somalia, it's 401 km southwest of the capital Mogadishu. It is home to a wide variety of wild animals, including the Big Five game animals. The vegetation in Afmadow consists of rich grassland, bounded by semi-desert. It is located northwest of Kismayo. The distance between Afmadow and Kismayo is 110 kilometers or 68 miles.

== Divisions ==
1. Waamo
2. Faanoole
3. Danwadaag

== Sub-Divisions ==
1. Bulowein
2. Bulo-Dano
3. Abaq-Baanboow
4. Adablaha
5. Hodan
6. Afarsaha
7. Cameroon
8. Barxada
9. Baldoos
10. Adoole
11. Bulo-Gumar

== History ==
Afmadow was captured in 2006 by the Islamic Court Union as were the other districts in the region during the Somali Civil War.

On 21 November 2009, the Islamist Al-Shabab militia took control of Afmadow, causing hundreds of families as well as western aid workers to flee in fear of violence. Another Islamist group, Hizbul Islam, left a day earlier, allowing Al-Shabab to move in without much resistance.

Tensions had been building between both militia since the former allies fell out in October in Kismayo, leading to fighting and Al-Shabab taking Kismayo in October 2009.

On 18 October 2011, eyewitnesses reported that Kenyan jets were flying low over the city and al-Shabab was preparing entrenchment systems to defend against an expected attack by the Kenyan Army as part of the Kenyan intervention in Somalia. At the time, the government in Mogadishu was denying the presence of Kenyan troops in Somalia.

On 31 May 2012, it was reported that the Jubaland security forces backed KDF captured the city, as al-Shabab abandoned the town without fighting.
