= Tabda =

- Town
- Location in Somalia.
- Coordinates: 0°18′13″N 41°26′10″E
- Country: Somalia
- Region: Lower Juba
- Time zone: UTC+3 (EAT)

Tabda, also known as Tabto, is a town in the southern Lower Juba (Jubbada Hoose) region of Somalia.
