= Kismayo =

Port city in Somalia

Kismayo Kismaayo, 𐒏𐒘𐒈𐒑𐒛𐒕𐒙 كيسمايو Kisimayo
- City
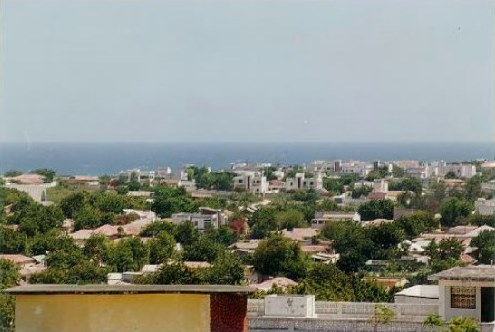
- Overview of Kismayo

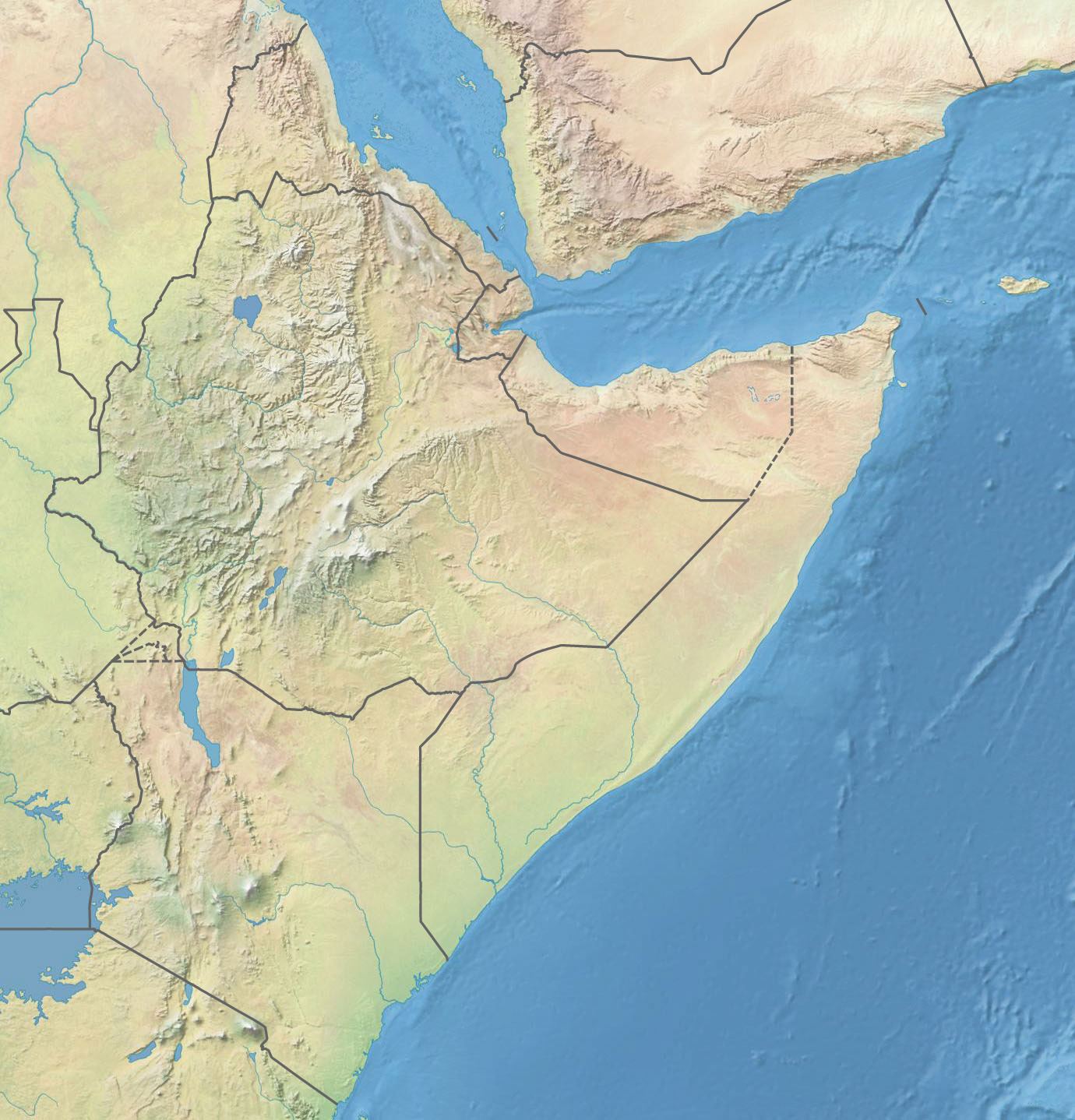
- Location within Somalia Location within the Horn of Africa Location within Africa
- Coordinates: 00°21′29″S 042°32′43″E
- Country: Somalia
- Regional State: Jubaland
- Region: Lower Juba
- District: Kismayo

Area
  - City: 22.5 km^{2} (8.7 sq mi)

Population (2014)
  - City: 234,852
  - Urban: 458,000
- Time zone: UTC+3 (EAT)

Kismayo (Somali: Kismaayo, 𐒏𐒘𐒈𐒑𐒛𐒕𐒙) is a port city in the southern Lower Juba (Jubbada Hoose) province of Somalia. It is the de facto capital of the autonomous Jubaland region.

The city is situated 528 kilometres (328 miles) southwest of the capital Mogadishu, near the mouth of the Jubba River, where it empties into the Indian Ocean. According to the United Nations Development Programme, the city of Kismayo had a population of around 89,333 in 2005.

During the Middle Ages, Kismayo and its surrounding area was part of the Ajuran Empire that governed much of southern Somalia and eastern Ethiopia, with its domain extending from Hafun in the north, to Qelafo in the west, to Kismayo in the south.

In the early modern period, Kismayo was ruled by the Geledi Sultanate and by the later 1800s, the Boqow dynasty. The kingdom was eventually incorporated into Italian Somaliland in 1925/6 after the death of the last sultan, Osman Ahmed. After independence in 1960, the city was made the center of the official Kismayo District.

Kismayo was the site of numerous battles during the civil war, from the early 1990s. In late 2006, Islamist militants affiliated with Al-Shabaab gained control of most of the city. To reclaim possession of the territory, a new autonomous regional administration dubbed Azania was announced in 2010 and formalized in 2011. In September 2012, the Somali National Army and AMISOM troops re-captured the city from the Al-Shabaab insurgents. The Juba Interim Administration was established and recognized in 2013.

== Demographics ==
Kismayo, a key port city in southern Somalia, is known for its diverse population. The Ogaden clan (a Darod sub-clan) are widely recognized as the primary and largest community in the city, with long-standing presence and influence in local demographics, federal alignment, and political affairs. Other significant communities include the Marehan clan (Darod), the Harti (Darod), and the Sheekhal (Hawiye), all of whom contribute to the city’s social and political landscape.

Other communities residing in Kismayo include Bimaal (Dir) and Gaalje'el (Hawiye), two historically significant Somali clans with deep cultural roots in the region; Tunni (Digil–Mirifle / Rahanweyn), an agro-pastoral clan native to the Lower Shabelle and Jubba regions; Somali Bantu (Jareer), a historically marginalized community with a distinct heritage; Bajuni (coastal minority), a coastal group with longstanding maritime traditions; and Sheekhal (Hawiye), known for their religious leadership.

According to estimates by humanitarian agencies, the city had around 634,000 residents as of 2014.

== History ==
=== Antiquity ===
During antiquity, Kismayo was part of the Somali city-states that in engaged in a lucrative trade network connecting Somali merchants with Phoenicia, Ptolemic Egypt, Greece, Parthian Persia, Saba, Nabataea and the Roman Empire. Somali sailors used the ancient Somali maritime vessel known as the beden to transport their cargo.

=== Middle Ages and the early modern period ===
Flag of the Ajuran Sultanate, an influential Somali empire that held sway over Kismayo and the larger Jubaland region during the Middle Ages.

The Kismayo area was originally a small fishing settlement.

During the Middle Ages, the region came under the rule of the influential Ajuran Sultanate, which utilized the Jubba River for its plantations.

After the collapse of this polity, the House of Gobroon was established and the Sultanate of the Geledi held sway over the area. The dynasty reached its apex under the successive reigns of Sultan Yusuf Mahamud Ibrahim, who successfully consolidated Gobroon power during the Bardera wars, and Sultan Ahmed Yusuf, who forced regional powers such as the Omani Empire to submit tribute.

=== Colonial Era ===
Until 1886, the Sultanate of Zanzibar controlled a substantial portion of the Swahili Coast, known as Zanj. Following the Berlin Conference of 1885, the British and Germans secretly agreed their spheres of influence, with the British to take what would become the East Africa Protectorate. Both powers leased coastal territory from Zanzibar and established trading stations and outposts. William Mackinnon, who already had an agreement with the Sultan, formed the Imperial British East Africa Company in 1888 and the company was given the original grant to administer the territory, leased from the Sultan. It administered about 240 km (150 mi) of coastline stretching from the River Jubba via Mombasa to German East Africa. The company failed and on 1 July 1895 the British government proclaimed a protectorate, the East Africa Protectorate, the administration being transferred to the Foreign Office.

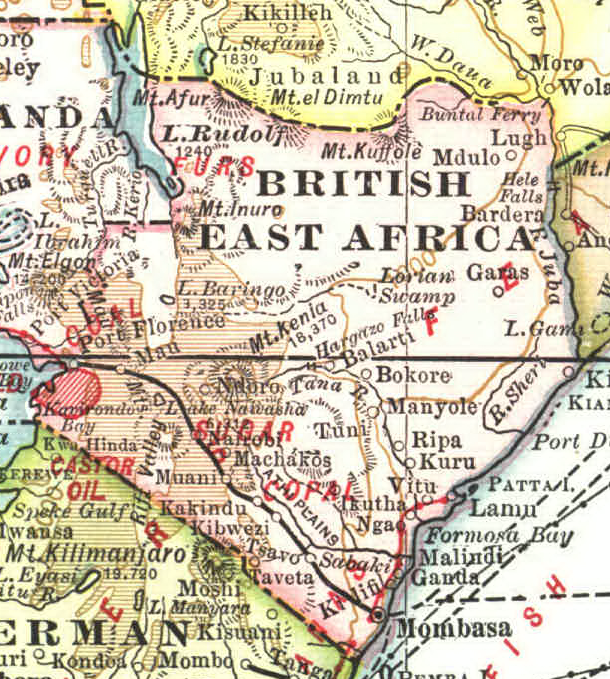
Map of British East Africa in 1909, showing boundary at the River Juba

To reward the Italians for joining the Allies in World War I, and following the Corfu incident of 1923, Britain decided to cede Kismayo and the northern half of Jubaland unconditionally to the Italian colonial empire. The northern half of the partitioned Jubaland territory, had a brief existence from 1924 as the Italian colony of Trans-Juba (Oltre Giuba). The Italians referred to the city as Chisimaio. The colony had a total area of 87,000 km^{2} (33,000 sq mi), with a population of 120,000 inhabitants. Jubaland was then incorporated into neighbouring Italian Somaliland on 30 June 1926.

Britain retained control of the southern half of the partitioned Jubaland territory, which was later called the Northern Frontier District (NFD). In 1941 Operation Canvas was launched from the NFD with the Battle of the Juba. Kismayo was quickly captured by 14 February.

=== Somali Civil War ===
Following the breakdown of central authority that accompanied the civil war in 1991, various local militias fought for control of the city, including supporters of Mohammed Said Hersi ("General Morgan"), and Col. Barre Adan Shire Hiiraale Somali National Front (SNF), later on known as the Juba Valley Alliance (JVA). As well of Col. Omar Jess' Somali Patriotic Movement (SPM). Aid worker Sean Devereux was assassinated in the city in January 1993. In March 1993, a United States Marine amphibious group arrived in the city in an attempt to keep the peace as part of the United Nations intervention in Somalia. By December 1993, General Morgan's troops controlled Kismayo, despite the presence of peacekeepers. The last UN troops left the city in December 1994.

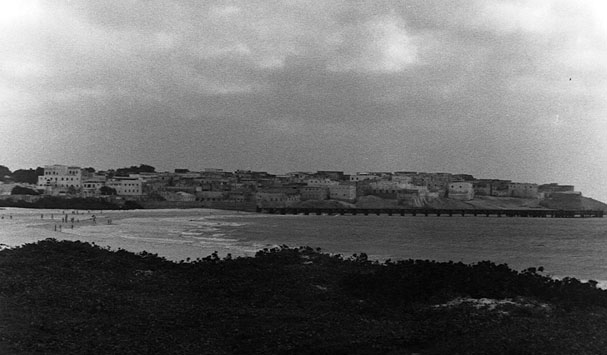
The Kismayo panorama just prior to the civil war.

General Morgan briefly declared Jubaland independent on September 3, 1998. Political opponents of his subsequently united as the Allied Somali Forces (ASF), seizing control of Kismayo by June of the following year. Led by Colonel Barre Adan Shire Hiiraale, the ASF administration renamed itself the Juba Valley Alliance in 2001. On June 18 of that year, an 11-member interclan council decided to ally the JVA with the newly forming Transitional Federal Government.

On January 8, 2007, as the Battle of Ras Kamboni raged just south of Kismayo, the TFG relocated from its interim location in Baidoa to the nation's capital, Mogadishu. This marked the first time since the fall of the Siad Barre regime in 1991 that the federal government controlled most of the country.

Following this defeat, the Islamic Courts Union splintered into several different factions. Some of the more radical elements, including Al-Shabaab, regrouped to continue their insurgency against the TFG and oppose the Ethiopian military's presence in Somalia. Throughout 2007 and 2008, Al‑Shabaab scored military victories, seizing control of key towns and ports in both central and southern Somalia. By January 2009, Al‑Shabaab and other militias had managed to force the Ethiopian troops to retreat, leaving behind an under-equipped African Union peacekeeping force to assist the Transitional Federal Government's troops.

In September 2012, Somali Army, Ras Kamboni militiamen and Kenyan Defense Forces (KDF), all under command of the African Union Mission in Somalia AMISOM, re-captured the city from the Al-Shabaab insurgents during the Battle of Kismayo (2012). This was a culmination to the Kenyan Operation Linda Nchi attack into Somalia which had begun late the year before.

On 12 July 2019, a car bomb and a gun attack at the Asasey hotel killed at least 26, including two prominent journalists and nine foreigners. Islamist group al-Shabaab claimed responsibility.

== Geography ==
=== Location ===
Kismayo is located in the fertile Juba Valley in southeastern Somalia, on the Somali Sea coast. Nearby settlements include to the northeast Xamareyso (5.0 nm), to the north Dalxiiska (1.3 nm), to the northwest Qeyla Dheere (6.4 nm), to the west Saamogia (0.9 nm), to the southwest Iach Bulle (10.0 nm), and to the south Qandal (6.5 nm). The largest cities in the country most proximate to Kismayo are Jamaame (52 km), Jilib (97 km), and Merca (337 km).

=== Climate ===
Kismayo has a tropical semi-arid climate (Köppen climate classification BSh) Weather is hot year-round, with seasonal monsoon winds and irregular rainfall with recurring droughts. The gu rains, also known as the Southwest Monsoons, begin in April and last until July producing significant fresh water and allowing lush vegetation to grow. The gu season is followed by the xagaa (hagaa) dry season.

Climate data for Kismayo
Month	Jan	Feb	Mar	Apr	May	Jun	Jul	Aug	Sep	Oct	Nov	Dec	Year
Record high °C (°F)	31.8 (89.2)	33.1 (91.6)	34.0 (93.2)	37.8 (100.0)	34.0 (93.2)	34.0 (93.2)	32.3 (90.1)	32.4 (90.3)	30.3 (86.5)	31.5 (88.7)	32.2 (90.0)	33.0 (91.4)	37.8 (100.0)
Mean daily maximum °C (°F)	29.6 (85.3)	29.9 (85.8)	31.0 (87.8)	31.8 (89.2)	30.4 (86.7)	28.6 (83.5)	28.0 (82.4)	28.3 (82.9)	28.6 (83.5)	29.5 (85.1)	30.5 (86.9)	30.5 (86.9)	29.7 (85.5)
Daily mean °C (°F)	27.1 (80.8)	27.3 (81.1)	28.2 (82.8)	28.6 (83.5)	27.3 (81.1)	26.1 (79.0)	25.6 (78.1)	25.7 (78.3)	26.0 (78.8)	26.8 (80.2)	27.5 (81.5)	27.5 (81.5)	27.0 (80.6)
Mean daily minimum °C (°F)	24.2 (75.6)	24.5 (76.1)	25.4 (77.7)	25.8 (78.4)	24.8 (76.6)	23.5 (74.3)	23.1 (73.6)	23.3 (73.9)	23.3 (73.9)	24.0 (75.2)	24.5 (76.1)	24.4 (75.9)	24.2 (75.6)
Record low °C (°F)	21.0 (69.8)	22.0 (71.6)	23.0 (73.4)	21.3 (70.3)	20.0 (68.0)	21.0 (69.8)	19.0 (66.2)	21.0 (69.8)	22.0 (71.6)	22.4 (72.3)	22.5 (72.5)	22.0 (71.6)	19.0 (66.2)
Average rainfall mm (inches)	1 (0.0)	1 (0.0)	3 (0.1)	69 (2.7)	121 (4.8)	99 (3.9)	52 (2.0)	21 (0.8)	21 (0.8)	15 (0.6)	17 (0.7)	3 (0.1)	424 (16.7)
Average rainy days (≥ 0.1 mm)	0	0	0	4	7	11	9	5	3	2	2	1	43
Average relative humidity (%)	77	76	76	77	80	80	80	79	78	78	77	77	78
Mean monthly sunshine hours	235.6	226.0	248.0	210.0	257.3	207.0	192.2	251.1	225.0	248.0	225.0	217.0	2,742.2
Mean daily sunshine hours	7.6	8.0	8.0	7.0	8.3	6.9	6.2	8.1	7.5	8.0	7.5	7.0	7.5
Percentage possible sunshine	64	73	69	62	59	57	56	62	64	66	66	66	64
Source 1: Deutscher Wetterdienst
Source 2: Food and Agriculture Organization: Somalia Water and Land Management (percent sunshine)

== Government ==
A new municipal district administration was established on 6 September 2008. Its members reportedly represented the ICU and Al‑Shabaab (three members each) in addition to a local clan (one member) which had played a part in the military assault. Representatives of the Islamic Courts Union questioned the legitimacy of the authority. On 1 October 2009, Al Shabaab took full control of the city, after Sheikh Ahmed Madobe, a senior commander of Ras Kamboni Brigade (then a part of Hizbul Islam), challenged Al‑Shabaab's control.

With the subsequent ouster of the Al-Shabaab rebels in September 2012, the Somali government began preparing mediations between the city's various stakeholders in order to establish an inclusive local administration. On 28 August 2013, the autonomous Jubaland administration signed a national reconciliation agreement in Addis Ababa with the federal government. Endorsed by the federal State Minister for the Presidency Farah Abdulkadir on behalf of President Hassan Sheikh Mohamud, the pact was brokered by the Foreign Ministry of Ethiopia and came after protracted bilateral talks.

Under the terms of the agreement, Jubaland is administered for a two-year period by a Juba Interim Administration and led by the region's incumbent president, Ahmed Mohamed Islam. The regional president serves as the chairperson of a new Executive Council, to which he appoints three deputies. Additionally, the agreement includes the integration of Jubaland's military forces under the central command of the Somali National Army (SNA), and stipulates that the Juba Interim Administration will command the regional police.

=== Districts ===
Kismayo is divided into 4 districts, or degmo (see map):

- Calanley
- Farjano
- Shaqaalaha
- Fanoole

== Education ==
Institutions of higher learning in the city include Kismayo University (KU). Established in August 2005, it is situated about 1 km north, along the Kismayo–Mogadishu main road.

== Economy ==
In October 2008, the daily labor rate was estimated at 157,500 Somali shillings (approximately $4.50), up from 52,000 shillings (approximately $2.21) in January 2008, while a kilogram of red rice rose from 14,170 (approximately $0.61) to 46,000 (approximately $1.31). A liter of diesel cost 43,000 shillings (approximately $1.23) and a camel costs over 15 million shillings (approximately $435). Total cereal production as of 2008 was estimated to be 780MT.

== Transportation ==
=== Airport ===
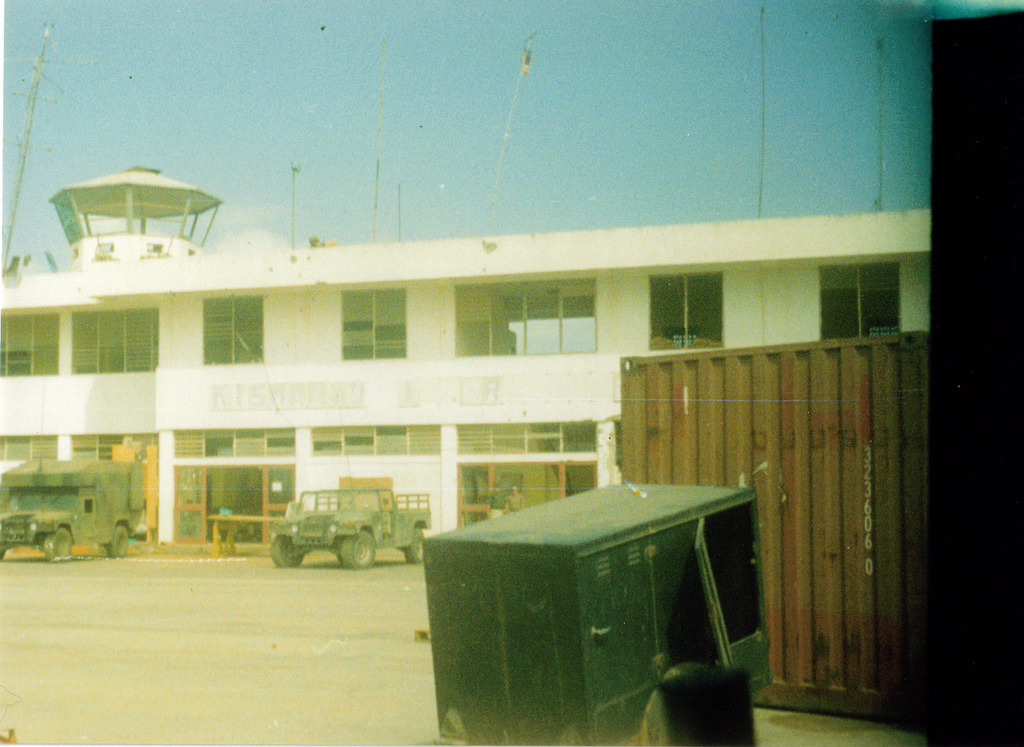
The Kismayo Airport.

Kismayo's air transportation needs are served by Kismayo Airport, which is situated about 10 km from the city. It was formerly a Somali Air Force training base. Following the outbreak of the civil war, the airport was closed down for a period of time and its infrastructure was significantly damaged. However, the facility was reopened in October 2008 by the Islamic Courts Union after undergoing some renovations. That same year, the airport was also renamed after Imam Ahmed Gurey, a 16th‑century Somali military leader.

The Kismayo Airport was officially brought under the Juba Interim Administration in August 2013. Per agreement, management of the facility was scheduled to be transferred to the Federal Government after a period of six months. Revenues and resources generated from the airport will also be earmarked for Jubaland's service delivery and security sectors as well as local institutional development.

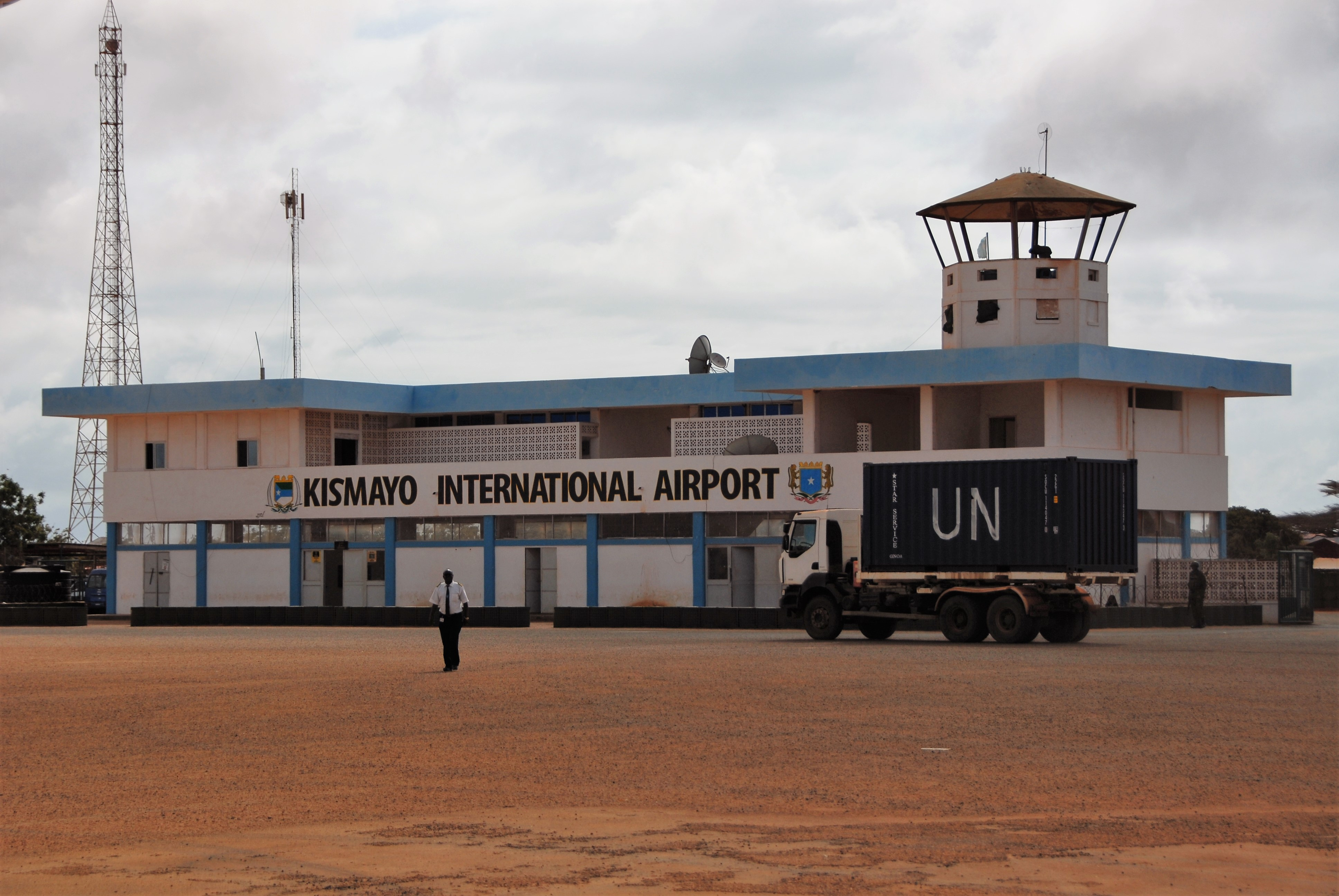
Kismayo International Airport

=== Roads ===
Three main thoroughfares connect Kismayo to other major areas in the country. The 600 km Highway 3 runs the length of the Juba Valley. Starting in Beled Hawo, it goes through Garbaharey, Bardera and Buale before finally reaching Kismayo.

A paved 528 km freeway links the capital Mogadishu with Kismayo, passing through Jilib before turning towards the capital. A third highway extends northwest from Kismayo to Afmadow, then turns toward Dhobley in the eastern part of the Gedo region.

In January 2015, the Interim Juba Administration launched a transport beautification and cleaning campaign in Kismayo. Part of a broader urbanization drive, the initiative includes the clearing of clogged streets and lanes, razing of illegal buildings therein, and further development of the municipal road network.

=== Seaport ===
Kismayo's large docks are situated on a peninsula on the Somali Sea coast. Formerly one of the Bajuni Islands, the peninsula was connected by a narrow causeway when the modern Port of Kismayo was built in 1964 with U.S. assistance. The port served as a base for the Somali Navy as well as the Soviet Navy after the 1969 military coup. In 1984, Somalia and the United States jointly refurbished the port after significant wear to the 2,070-foot-long (630 m) four-berth, marginal wharf made major renovations necessary.

The Port of Kismayo was officially brought under the Juba Interim Administration in August 2013. According to the agreement, management of the facility was scheduled to be transferred to the Somali Federal Government after a period of six months. Like Kismayo Airport, revenues and resources generated by the seaport are to be earmarked for Jubaland's service delivery and security sectors as well as local institutional development.

== Notable residents ==
- Mohammed Sagaf, footballer born in Kismayo, currently representing Tanzania national football team
- Mohamed Ibrahim Liqliiqato, military and political leader; ambassador to the Soviet Union and West Germany; Speaker of Parliament (1983–1990)
- Abdullahi Ahmed Irro, general in the Somali National Army
- Hussein Samatar, politician, banker and community organizer

== See also ==
- Fall of Kismayo
