= Lower Juba =

Region of Somalia

Lower Juba Jubbada Hoose Jubithy Hoosy Basso Giuba
- Region
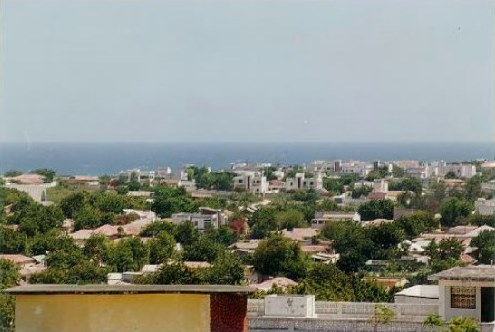
- Overview of Kismayo.

- Location in Somalia.
- Coordinates: 0°26′N 41°36′E
- Country: Somalia
- Regional State: Jubaland
- Capital: Kismayo

Area
  - Total: 42,876 km^{2} (16,555 sq mi)

Population (2019)
  - Total: 1,632,900
  - Density: 38.084/km^{2} (98.638/sq mi)
- Time zone: UTC+3 (EAT)
- ISO 3166 code: SO-JH
- HDI (2021): 0.300 low · 13th of 18

Lower Juba (Somali: Jubbada Hoose, Maay: Jubithy Hoosy, Arabic: جوبا السفلى, Italian: Basso Giuba) is an administrative region (gobol) in southern Somalia. With its capital at Kismayo, it lies in the autonomous Jubaland region.

Lower Juba is bordered by Kenya, the Somali regions of Gedo and Middle Juba (Jubbada Dhexe), and the Somali Sea. The province is named after the Jubba River that passes through it and empties into the Somali Sea at Goobweyn. The Lag Badana National Park is situated in Lower Juba.

== Districts ==
Lower Juba Region consists of 5 districts:

- Kismaayo District
- Afmadow District
- Badhaadhe District
- Jamaame District
- Xagar District

The Bajuni Islands are also within the region.
