= List of wars involving the United States in the 21st century =

This is a list of military conflicts involving the United States in the 21st century.

This list is part of a larger series of list articles that cover the various wars involving the United States from its colonial roots to the present. They are:

- Lists of wars involving the United States
  - List of 17th-century wars involving the Thirteen Colonies (1609–1700)
  - List of 18th-century wars involving the Thirteen Colonies (1701–1774)
  - List of wars involving the United States in the 18th century (1775–1800)
  - List of wars involving the United States in the 19th century (1801-1850)
  - List of wars involving the United States in the 19th century (1851-1900)
  - List of wars involving the United States in the 20th century (1901–2000)
  - List of wars involving the United States in the 21st century (2001–present)

For the criteria of what may be permitted on this list, see Lists of wars involving the United States.

== Key ==
US victory (15)
Another result (6) (Note: A treaty or peace without a clear result, status quo ante bellum, result of civil or internal conflict, result unknown or indecisive, inconclusive.)
US defeat (5)
Ongoing conflict (7)

== 21st-century wars ==
Conflict	Allies	Opponent(s)	Result	President(s)
War in Afghanistan (2001–2021) Part of the war on terror and the Afghan conflict Location: Afghanistan U.S. Army soldiers, prepare to board a Ch-47 Chinook helicopter before an air assault into a valley near Do Ab Village, Nuristan province in Afghanistan, May 2011.	Post-invasion (2001–2021) RS: (2015–2021): United States; United Kingdom; Germany; Italy; Poland; Czech Republic; Slovakia; Turkey; Georgia; Australia; New Zealand; and others; ISAF: (2001–2014): United States; United Kingdom; Canada; Austria; Germany; Italy; Poland; Czech Republic; Slovakia; Turkey; Georgia; Singapore; South Korea; Australia; New Zealand; and others; Local forces: Islamic Republic of Afghanistan (2004–2021); Afghan Transitional Authority (2002–2004); Islamic State of Afghanistan (2001–2002); Khost Protection Force and other pro-government paramilitaries (2002–2021) Invasion phase (2001); United States; United Kingdom; France; Canada; Italy; Germany; Australia; New Zealand Local forces: Northern Alliance	Post-invasion (2001–2021) Taliban: Haqqani network; Taliban splinter groups: Mullah Dadullah Front; Fidai Mahaz; al-Qaeda: Al-Qaeda in the Indian Subcontinent; Islamic State – Khorasan Province: Islamic Movement of Uzbekistan; Supported by: Hezb-e-Islami Gulbuddin; Islamic Jihad Union; Turkistan Islamic Party; Lashkar-e-Jhangvi; Pakistani Taliban; Lashkar-e-Islam Invasion phase (2001); Islamic Emirate of Afghanistan: Taliban; Haqqani network; Non-state allies: al-Qaeda: 055 Brigade; Islamic Movement of Uzbekistan; Tehreek-e-Nafaz-e-Shariat-e-Mohammadi; Jama'at al-Tawhid wal-Jihad	Taliban victory: United States invasion of Afghanistan after the September 11, 2001 terrorist attacks; Destruction of al-Qaeda and Taliban militant training camps (2001); Fall of the Taliban government (2001) and Establishment of the Islamic Republic of Afghanistan; Human rights violations at Guantánamo Bay detention camp; Start of Taliban insurgency; Osama bin Laden killed by SEAL Team Six in Pakistan (2011); "Afghanization" of Afghan conflict. Withdrawal of most US troops by 2014; End of Operation Enduring Freedom; start of Operation Freedom's Sentinel.; End of US and ISAF led combat mission; beginning of NATO-led training and assistance mission.; Doha Agreement and progressive withdrawal of remaining US troops after 2020; Renewed Taliban offensive in 2021; Taliban forces capture Kabul on August 15, 2021, and overthrow the U.S.-backed Islamic Republic of Afghanistan; Re-establishment of the Taliban-run Islamic Emirate of Afghanistan; Start of Operation Allies Refuge; On August 30, 2021, the last American military plane departed Afghanistan; Billions of dollars of foreign-origin military hardware that was formerly in custody of the Islamic Republic of Afghanistan seized by Taliban; Taliban takeover of Afghanistan	George W. Bush (January 20, 2001 – January 20, 2009) Barack Obama (January 20, 2009 – January 20, 2017) Donald Trump (January 20, 2017 – January 20, 2021) Joe Biden (January 20, 2021 – January 20, 2025)
US intervention in Yemen (2002–present) Part of the war on terror and the Yemeni civil war Location: Yemen U.S. MQ-9 Predator commonly used in drone strikes in Yemen.	United States	Al-Qaeda: Al-Qaeda in the Arabian Peninsula; Ansar al-Sharia; Al-Qaeda Emirate in Yemen; Aden-Abyan Islamic Army; Hadrami Domestic Council faction Al-Dhahab tribesmen Supported by: Al-Shabaab; Al-Qaeda in the Islamic Maghreb; Al-Qaeda in the Indian Subcontinent; Al-Nusra Front Islamic State of Iraq and the Levant: Military of ISIL; Wilayah al-Yemen; Wilayat Sanaa; Wilayat Aden-Abyan; Wilayah Lahij; Wilayah Green Brigade; Wilayah al-Bayda; Wilayah Shabwah; Wilayah Ataq; Wilayah Hadramawt	Ongoing: U.S. intervention against jihadists in Yemen; 379 drone strikes confirmed; Numerous al-Qaeda bases in the Arabian Peninsula destroyed; More than 1,500 militants confirmed killed; U.S. Navy SEALs conducted hostage rescue operations in 2014; Two military raids in Hathla and Yakla in 2017; In 2022, the Biden administration confirmed that a small number of U.S. military personnel are deployed and conducting operations against al-Qa’ida within Yemen; Most recent drone strike launched in January 2026	George W. Bush (January 20, 2001 – January 20, 2009) Barack Obama (January 20, 2009 – January 20, 2017) Donald Trump (January 20, 2017 – January 20, 2021) Joe Biden (January 20, 2021 – January 20, 2025) Donald Trump (January 20, 2025 – Incumbent)
Operation Freedom Eagle (2002–2017) Part of the civil conflict in the Philippines, Operation Enduring Freedom and the war on terror Location: Philippines U.S. Marines fire M240 machine gun from Humvee in Zamboanga City, April 2003	Philippines; United States	Islamic State – East Asia Province; Bangsamoro Islamic Freedom Fighters; Islamic State of Lanao; Moro Islamic Liberation Front; Islamic State of Iraq and the Levant	US-allied victory: The Operation targeted the various jihadist terror groups operating in the Philippines; U.S. military personnel were advising and assisting the Armed Forces of the Philippines in the Southern Philippines; In 2014, the CIA had sent its elite paramilitary officers from their Special Activities Division to hunt down and kill or capture key terrorist leaders; Substantial reduction in capabilities of domestic and transnational terrorist groups operating in the Philippines; Civil conflict in the Philippines continues	George W. Bush (January 20, 2001 – January 20, 2009) Barack Obama (January 20, 2009 – January 20, 2017) Donald Trump (January 20, 2017 – January 20, 2021)
Iraq War (2003–2011) Part of the Iraqi conflict and the war on terror Location: Iraq U.S. soldiers at the Hands of Victory monument in Baghdad, May 2009.	Post-invasion (2003–2011) USF-I: (2010–2011): United States; MNF–I: (2003–2009): United States; United Kingdom; Australia; New Zealand; Poland; Spain; Italy; Czech Republic; Slovakia; Hungary; South Korea; Japan; Philippines; Singapore; and others; Local forces: Iraq; Kurdistan Region; Awakening Council Invasion phase (2003); Coalition of the willing: United States; United Kingdom; Australia; Poland; and others; Local forces: Kurdistan Region: Kurdistan Democratic Party; Patriotic Union of Kurdistan; Iraqi National Congress; Free Iraqi Forces	Post-invasion (2003–2011) Al-Qaeda in Iraq; Islamic Army in Iraq; Islamic State of Iraq; Mahdi Army (Ba'athist Iraq) Naqshbandi Army; Hamas of Iraq; Jaysh al-Mujahideen; 1920 Revolution Brigades; Jamaat Ansar al-Sunna Invasion phase (2003) (Ba'athist Iraq) Republic of Iraq: MEK	Inconclusive/Other Result: Invasion and occupation of Iraq, based on belief that Saddam Hussein possessed weapons of mass destruction; Overthrow of Arab Socialist Ba'ath Party government; Establishment of democratic elections and formation of new Shia-led government; Capture and execution of Saddam Hussein; Search for weapons of mass destruction has failed; Large number of civilian casualties, more than 200,000 Iraqi civilians killed; Emergence of significant insurgency, rise of al-Qaeda in Iraq, and severe sectarian violence; American troop surge in 2007; Subsequent reduction in violence and depletion of al-Qaeda in Iraq; Islamic State of Iraq territorially defeated by mid-2008; U.S.–Iraq Status of Forces Agreement in 2008; Withdrawal of U.S. forces from Iraq in 2011; Weak and unstable democracy in Iraq; Stronger Iranian influence; Escalation of sectarian insurgency after U.S. withdrawal leading to the rise of the Islamic State of Iraq and the Levant, the successor of al-Qaeda in Iraq; Return of US forces to Iraq in 2014	George W. Bush (January 20, 2001 – January 20, 2009) Barack Obama (January 20, 2009 – January 20, 2017)
US intervention in the Iraqi Kurdistan conflict (2003) Part of the Iraqi Kurdistan conflict, the Iraq War, and the war on terror Location: Kurdistan Region, Iraq Green Berets, CIA SAD agents and CTG after defeating Ansar al-Islam jihadists during Operation Viking Hammer, March 2003.	United States: CIA; Local forces: Kurdistan Region: Peshmerga; Patriotic Union of Kurdistan; Kurdistan Counter-Terrorism Unit	Islamic Emirate of Kurdistan: Ansar al-Islam in Kurdistan; Kurdistan Islamic Group; Kurdistan Islamic Movement	US-allied victory: U.S. intervention against jihadists in Iraqi Kurdistan Region; Ansar al-Islam, a radical Islamist group with ties to al-Qaeda in northern Iraq was eliminated; End of the Islamic Emirate of Kurdistan; The operation secured the northern front for allied forces during the invasion of Iraq; The US-led occupation of Iraq resulted in the formal recognition of the Kurdistan Region as a federal region in the new Iraqi constitution, cementing the area's de facto autonomy	George W. Bush (January 20, 2001 – January 20, 2009)
Bawean incident (2003) Location: Indonesia Two F/A-18C Hornets from USS Carl Vinson photographed by an Indonesian Air Force B737-200 over the sea off Lombok Island, July 2003.	United States	Indonesia	Inconclusive/Other Result: F/A-18 Hornet jammed Indonesian F-16B, but another F/A-18 Hornet was successfully locked by Indonesian Air Force F-16B.; Resolved with signals and communication; US Carrier Strike Group leaves Indonesian territory; Indonesia filed a diplomatic complaint to the United States	George W. Bush (January 20, 2001 – January 20, 2009)
US intervention in the War in North-West Pakistan (2004–2018) Part of the Insurgency in Khyber Pakhtunkhwa, the War in Afghanistan, Pakistan–United States skirmishes, and the war on terror Location: Pakistan U.S. MQ-1 Predator drones typically used in covert bombing operations in Pakistan.	Pakistan United States Supported by: United Kingdom	Taliban; Pakistani Taliban; TNSM; Haqqani network; al-Qaeda; Lashkar-e-Islam; Foreign Mujahideen; Uzbek Islamic Movement; Turkistan Islamic Party; Islamic State affiliates	US-allied victory: U.S. intervention against jihadists in Pakistan; 430 drone strikes confirmed; Destruction of numerous insurgent camps and safe havens; 81 high-level insurgent leaders and thousands of low-level insurgents killed; Deaths of Afghan Taliban head Akhtar Mansour, and successive Pakistani Taliban heads Baitullah Mehsud and Hakimullah Mehsud; Deaths of hundreds of Pakistani civilians; Most recent drone strike launched in July 2018	George W. Bush (January 20, 2001 – January 20, 2009) Barack Obama (January 20, 2009 – January 20, 2017) Donald Trump (January 20, 2017 – January 20, 2021)
Second US Intervention in the Somali Civil War (2007–present) Part of the war on terror, Operation Enduring Freedom (Operation Enduring Freedom – Horn of Africa) and the Somali Civil War Location: Somalia U.S. Marines establish security positions at Baledogle Airfield in Somalia, December 2020.	United States Supported by: Ethiopia; Somalia; Puntland African Union missions: (African Union) AUSSOM (2025–present): Djibouti; Egypt; Ethiopia; Kenya; Uganda; (African Union) ATMIS (2022–2024): Burundi; Djibouti; Ethiopia; Kenya; Uganda; (African Union) AMISOM (2007–2022): Burundi; Djibouti; Ethiopia; Ghana; Kenya; Nigeria; Sierra Leone; Uganda	Islamic Courts Union al-Shabaab al-Qaeda; Alleged support: Iran; North Korea Hizbul Islam Islamic State in Somalia	Ongoing: U.S. intervention against jihadists in Somalia; U.S. backed Ethiopian invasion and rise of Al-Shabaab (2006–2009); Numerous U.S. drone strikes targeting al-Shabaab and Islamic State – Somalia Province; African Union Intervention (2007–2022); Kenyan intervention (2011–2012); Newly formed federal government established in 2012; SEAL Team Six operations; Operation Celestial Balance in 2009; Failed raid targeted Abdukadir Mohamed Abdukadir in 2013; Navy SEAL killed in raid in 2017; US airstrikes in November 2017 and December 2018; Attack on US base in Kenya in 2020; Majority of U.S. Troops withdraw in January 2021; African Union Transition Mission (2022–2024); Redeployment of U.S. troops in 2022; United States supports Somali forces and a multinational African Union force with drone strikes, intelligence and training; Most recent drone strike launched in December 2025; African Union Support and Stabilization Mission (2025–present); In 2025, al-Shabaab launched a significant offensive; Jihadists reclaimed territory lost in 2022-2023	George W. Bush (January 20, 2001 – January 20, 2009) Barack Obama (January 20, 2009 – January 20, 2017) Donald Trump (January 20, 2017 – January 20, 2021) Joe Biden (January 20, 2021 – January 20, 2025) Donald Trump (January 20, 2025 – Incumbent)
Pakistan–US skirmishes (2008–2012) Part of the War in Afghanistan and the war on terror Location: Pakistan U.S. Army soldiers and Afghan border police walk along the Afghanistan-Pakistan border, January 2013	United States; Islamic Republic of Afghanistan	Pakistan	Inconclusive/Other Result: A series of lethal military clashes and airstrikes occurred along the Afghanistan-Pakistan border; The U.S. pursued militants across the border, while Pakistan viewed these incursions as violations of its national sovereignty; In June 2008, a U.S. airstrike killed 11 Pakistani paramilitary troops; The peak of the conflict occurred in 2011 when NATO airstrikes killed 24 Pakistani soldiers, leading to a complete freeze in diplomatic relations; In retaliation for these skirmishes, Pakistan repeatedly closed supply routes, cutting off vital fuel and hardware for NATO troops in Afghanistan; The period of active skirmishing largely ended in 2012 after a formal U.S. apology	George W. Bush (January 20, 2001 – January 20, 2009) Barack Obama (January 20, 2009 – January 20, 2017)
NATO Operation Ocean Shield (2009–2016) Part of the Operation Enduring Freedom (Operation Enduring Freedom – Horn of Africa) Location: Indian Ocean, Gulf of Aden, Guardafui Channel, Arabian Sea and Red Sea A tall plume of black smoke rises from a destroyed pirate vessel that was struck by USS Farragut, March 2010.	NATO: United States; Belgium; Canada; Denmark; Germany; Greece; Italy; Netherlands; Norway; Portugal; Spain; Turkey; United Kingdom; Non-NATO forces: Australia; China; Colombia; India; Indonesia; Japan; Malaysia; New Zealand; Oman; Pakistan; Peru; Philippines; Russia; Saudi Arabia; Seychelles; Singapore; South Africa; South Korea; Taiwan; Thailand; Ukraine; Yemen	Somali pirates	US-allied victory: The anti-piracy operation follows the earlier NATO Operation Allied Protector, which was primarily defensive and focused on providing escorts; NATO's contribution to Operation Enduring Freedom – Horn of Africa; American and foreign hostages were rescued by the U.S. Navy and SEAL Team Six from Somali pirates; In 2007, North Korean crew overpower pirates with U.S. aid; In 2009, the rescue mission of Captain Richard Phillips and crew of Maersk Alabama; In 2012, the rescue mission called Operation Octave Fusion of two aid workers in Somalia; In December 2008, European Union launched own naval mission Operation Atalanta; In January 2009, the Combined Maritime Forces launched Combined Task Force 151, a multinational mission specifically dedicated to counter-piracy operations; Number of pirate attacks dramatically decreased; Piracy drops 90% in 2013	Barack Obama (January 20, 2009 – January 20, 2017)
International intervention in Libya (2011) Part of the First Libyan Civil War and the Arab Spring Location: Libya U.S. B-2 Spirit stealth bomber aircraft returns to base from a mission in Libya, as part of Operation Odyssey Dawn, March 2011.	NATO (Note: Enforcing UNSC Resolution 1973): United States; Belgium; Bulgaria; Canada; Denmark; France; Greece; Italy; Netherlands; Norway; Romania; Spain; Turkey; United Kingdom; Non-NATO forces: Jordan; Qatar; Sweden; United Arab Emirates Libyan opposition: (Libya) Anti-Gaddafi forces	Libyan Arab Jamahiriya: Armed Forces; Pro-Gaddafi militias; Mercenaries (alleged)	US-allied victory: The intervention primarily undertaken to protect civilians from widespread and systematic attacks by Muammar Gaddafi's forces, as authorized by the UN Security Council; Start of US-led military operation codnamed Operation Odyssey Dawn to impose a no-fly zone for Libyan government forces; Effective no-fly zone established; Operations handed over to NATO Operation Unified Protector; Overthrow and killing of Muammar Gaddafi by Anti-Gaddafi forces; Collapse of the Great Socialist People's Libyan Arab Jamahiriya; Tensions between Libyan factions following the fall of Gaddafi lead to renewed civil war in 2014; Continuation of the Libyan Crisis	Barack Obama (January 20, 2009 – January 20, 2017)
Operation Observant Compass (2011–2017) Part of the Lord's Resistance Army insurgency and war on terror Location: Uganda, the Democratic Republic of the Congo, South Sudan and the Central African Republic U.S. Marine Sgt. Joseph Bergeron, a task force combat engineer, explains combat marksmanship tactics to a group of Ugandan soldiers, February 2012.	United States Supported by: Uganda; Democratic Republic of the Congo; South Sudan; Central African Republic	Lord's Resistance Army	US-allied victory: U.S. military operation against Christian extremist group Lord's Resistance Army (LRA) in central Africa; About 100 U.S. Special Forces, mostly Green Berets, were sent to the region to provide elite tactical support; Founder and leader of the LRA Joseph Kony goes into hiding; In 2014, senior LRA commander Dominic Ongwen surrenders to American forces in the Central African Republic and in 2021 the International Criminal Court convicted him of war crimes and crimes against humanity; Majority of LRA installations and encampments located in South Sudan and Uganda abandoned and dismantled; Small scale LRA activity continues in eastern DR Congo, and the Central African Republic	Barack Obama (January 20, 2009 – January 20, 2017) Donald Trump (January 20, 2017 – January 20, 2021)
Benghazi attack and subsequent US raids in Libya (2012, 2014, 2017) Part of the Factional violence in Libya, the Libyan crisis, Arab Spring, and the Aftermath of the Libyan civil war Location: Libya Map showing locations of U.S. mission (main compound) and annex at the time of the 2012 Benghazi attack.	United States	Ansar al-Sharia; Al-Qaeda in the Islamic Maghreb (Alleged)	Inconclusive/Other Result: Coordinated attack against two U.S. government facilities in Benghazi in 2012; US Ambassador J. Christopher Stevens, USFS officer Sean Smith and two Military Contractors killed in action; Both U.S. facilities were destroyed and abandoned; Subsequent capture of perpetrators; Delta Force captures Ahmed Abu Khattala south of Benghazi in 2014; U.S. forces capture Mustafa al-Imam in Misrata in 2017; Both convicted in U.S. federal court	Barack Obama (January 20, 2009 – January 20, 2017)
US military intervention in Niger (2013–2024) Part of the Operation Enduring Freedom (Operation Juniper Shield), the war on terror, the Jihadist insurgency in Niger and the War in the Sahel Location: Burkina Faso, Mali and Niger U.S. and Nigerien soldiers training, April 2018.	United States Supported by: Niger (until coup d'état); France Training: European Union; Canada; Belgium; Germany; Italy	Al-Qaeda: Nusrat al-Islam; ISIL: Islamic State – West Africa Province; Islamic State in the Greater Sahara; Boko Haram	Failure in suppressing jihadists: U.S. intervention against jihadists in Niger and in the Sahel region of Africa; The French intervention known as Operation Barkhane targeted jihadists in Niger and neighboring Mali and Burkina Faso (2014–2022); U.S. support with intelligence, airlift, refueling and logistics; The French withdrawal from the Sahel after failing to contain the jihadist threat; Four U.S. Green Berets killed in action during Tongo Tongo ambush in 2017; The 2023 Nigerien coup d'état resulted in the overthrow of democratically elected president and the establishment of a military junta; In 2024, Niger's junta ended a military agreement that allowed U.S. troops to be deployed in the country; U.S. lost access to Niger Air Base 201, largest drone base in Africa built by the United States for $110 million; Beginning of new military cooperation between Niger and Russia; Withdrawal of U.S. ground forces from Niger; Jihadi groups linked to Al-Qaeda, the Islamic State group and Boko Haram remained still active in Niger in 2024	Barack Obama (January 20, 2009 – January 20, 2017) Donald Trump (January 20, 2017 – January 20, 2021) Joe Biden (January 20, 2021 – January 20, 2025)
US MV Morning Glory capture operation (2014) Location: Mediterranean Sea The oil tanker was seized by a U.S. Navy SEAL team and USS Roosevelt.	United States	Libyan Rebels	US victory: MV Morning Glory and 3 rebels captured; Vessel handed over to Libyan authorities	Barack Obama (January 20, 2009 – January 20, 2017)
US-led intervention in Iraq (2014–2021) Part of the Operation Inherent Resolve, the War against the Islamic State, the war on terror, the War in Iraq, and the Islamic State insurgency in Iraq Location: Iraq U.S. soldiers use a rooftop as an observation post, during the Battle of Mosul in Iraq, March 2017.	CJTF–OIR: United States; Australia; Belgium; Canada; Denmark; France; Germany; Italy; Jordan; Morocco; Netherlands; New Zealand; United Kingdom; Turkey; and others; Local forces: Iraq: Iraqi Armed Forces; ISOF; IrAF; Nineveh Plain Protection Units; Peshmerga	Islamic State Of Iraq and The Levant; White Flags Iran	US-allied victory: Start of Operation Inherent Resolve against jihadists in Iraq; Tens of thousands of ISIL fighters killed; 14,616 U.S. and allied airstrikes on ISIL positions in Iraq; Heavy damage dealt to ISIL forces; military defeat in Iraq; Iraq declares military victory against ISIL on 9 December 2017; Low-intensity ISIL insurgency following December 2017; Assassination of Qasem Soleimani in 2020; Presence of U.S. troops in Iraq minimized; Coalition ends combat mission in December 2021; Withdrawal of U.S. ground forces from Baghdad and key military bases in Iraq in 2025; Iraqi government forces regain control of all parts of Iraq previously controlled by ISIL	Barack Obama (January 20, 2009 – January 20, 2017) Donald Trump (January 20, 2017 – January 20, 2021) Joe Biden (January 20, 2021 – January 20, 2025)
US intervention in Syria (2014–2026) Part of the Operation Inherent Resolve, the War against the Islamic State, the war on terror, foreign involvement in the Syrian civil war, the Rojava Revolution and the Syrian conflict Location: Syria U.S. 1st Battalion, 6th Infantry Regiment troops conduct area reconnaissance patrol in Syria, February 2021.	Against Ba'athist regime: United States; Turkey Against jihadists: CJTF–OIR: United States; Turkey; United Kingdom; France; Canada; Bahrain; Belgium; Germany; Saudi Arabia; United Arab Emirates; Qatar; Morocco; Australia; Netherlands; Denmark; Italy; and others; Local forces: (against Ba'athist regime and jihadists) (Syrian opposition) Free Syrian Army; Syrian Democratic Forces: YPG; YPJ; Syriac Military Council; Al-Sanadid Forces; Euphrates Volcano; Ukraine (against Russia only)	Ba'athist regime: Ba'athist Syria Supported by: Russia: Wagner group (Note: The Wagner group fought the United States directly during the Battle of Khasham in 2018); Interbrigades; Iran: Liwa Fatemiyoun; Hezbollah; Islamic Resistance in Iraq; Popular Mobilization Forces; Kata'ib Hezbollah; Liwa Zainebiyoun Jihadists: (against Global Coalition, Ba'athist regime and Syrian opposition); Islamic Front; Syrian Salvation Government: Ahrar al-Sham; Tahrir al-Sham; Jaysh al-Sunna; Islamic State al-Qaeda: al-Nusra Front; Khorasan group; Rouse the Believers Operations Room; Hurras al-Din; Jund al-Aqsa; Turkistan Islamic Party	US-allied victory US Intervention against jihadists: Start of Operation Inherent Resolve against jihadists in Syria; 19,786+ U.S. and allied airstrikes, over 16,000 hitting ISIL positions; Thousands of ISIS targets destroyed and thousands more militants captured or killed; Deployment of U.S. Marines and Special Forces in 2015; ISIL lose Mosul and Raqqa (2017), then other most of territory in Iraq and then Syria; United States declares military victory against ISIS on December 18, 2018; ISIS resurgence in 2019; Death of ISIS caliphs: Abu Bakr al-Baghdadi in 2019, Abu Ibrahim al-Hashimi al-Qurashi and Abu al-Hasan al-Hashimi al-Qurashi in 2022 and Abu al-Hussein al-Husseini al-Qurashi in 2023; In December 2025, an insider attack near Palmyra killed three Americans; In direct response to a deadly ambush, the U.S. launched Operation Hawkeye Strike; In 2025, the United States significantly reduced its troop presence in Syria; Withdrawal of all remaining U.S. ground forces in 2026; ISIS in Syria largely defeated; Total territorial loss; Lone wolf terrorist attacks continue; US-allied victory US Intervention against Assad government: The Syrian Government's widespread and systematic use of chemical weapons against the civilian population to suppress the Syrian revolution; Beginning of Syrian civil war; Ghouta chemical attack leading to OPCW-UN Joint Mission in Syria (2013–2014); American support for anti-government rebels; Khan Shaykhun chemical attack in 2017 results in U.S. retaliatory naval strike in Syria; Douma chemical attack in 2018 results in retaliatory strikes against Syria; Various confrontations and airstrikes by United States on forces belonging to, or allied with the Syrian government; Russian direct military involvement after a request for military support by the government of Bashar al-Assad (2015–2024); Attacks on U.S. bases in Syria in 2023 and 2024; A U.S. F-16 fighter jet shot down an allied Turkish drone in October 2023; In December 2024, US-backed rebels enter Damascus and topple the Ba'athist Syria regime; Fall of the Assad regime; Bashar al-Assad flees to Russia; Start of Syrian conflict; Ongoing disputes and clashes following the fall of the Assad regime	Barack Obama (January 20, 2009 – January 20, 2017) Donald Trump (January 20, 2017 – January 20, 2021) Joe Biden (January 20, 2021 – January 20, 2025) Donald Trump (January 20, 2025 – Incumbent)
US intervention in Saudi Arabian–led operations in Yemen (2015–2021) Part of the Saudi-led intervention in the Yemeni civil war, Yemeni civil war and the Iran–Saudi Arabia proxy conflict Location: Yemen USS Theodore Roosevelt participating in the naval blockade of Yemen during Saudi Arabia's Operation Decisive Storm, April 2015	Saudi Arabia; United Arab Emirates; Bahrain; Kuwait; Qatar; Egypt; Jordan; Morocco; Sudan; Senegal Supported by: United States; United Kingdom; France; Canada; Germany Local forces: Cabinet of Yemen: Yemen Armed Forces (pro-Hadi); Yemeni Air Force; Popular Resistance	Revolutionary Committee/Supreme Political Council: Houthi movement; Yemen Armed Forces; Yemeni Republican Guard; Supported by: Iran Syria; North Korea; Qatar; Russia; Hezbollah; Cuba; Eritrea; Oman; Libya	Failure in suppressing Houthis: Saudi-led coalition forces intervene in Yemen in 2015 to restore the internationally recognized Yemen government; United States supported the Saudi Arabian-led intervention primarily through arms sales, technical assistance and intelligence; The U.S. Navy has actively participated in the Saudi-led naval blockade, which contributed to the outbreak of famine in Yemen.; Green Berets deployed to the Saudi Arabia-Yemen border to help defeat the Houthi rebels in 2018; In February 2021, the Biden administration announced an end to U.S. support for the Saudi-led coalition; In 2021, Yemen was witnessing “the worst humanitarian crisis in the past 100 years”; The Houthis maintain control over the capital Sanaa, and much of northern Yemen; Since October 2023, the Houthis have dramatically escalated attacks on commercial shipping in the Red Sea and Gulf of Aden; Beginning of Red Sea crisis; The U.S. directly intervened against the Houthis as part of US-led Operation Prosperity Guardian	Barack Obama (January 20, 2009 – January 20, 2017) Donald Trump (January 20, 2017 – January 20, 2021) Joe Biden (January 20, 2021 – January 20, 2025)
US intervention in Libya (2015–2019) Part of the Operation Inherent Resolve, the War against the Islamic State, the war on terror and the Second Libyan Civil War Location: Libya An AV-8B Harrier II aboard USS Wasp taking part in Operation Odyssey Lightning, August 2016.	United States; United Kingdom; France; Jordan Local forces: Libya: Government of National Accord	ISIL in Libya: Wilayah al-Tarabulus; Wilayah al-Fizan; Wilayah Barqah; Al-Qaeda in the Islamic Maghreb	US-allied victory: Start of Operation Inherent Resolve against jihadists in Libya in 2015; Operation Odyssey Lightning began targeting jihadists in 2016 to support the Libyan government against ISIL; Thousands of ISIL targets destroyed; ISIL-held territory recaptured; presence minimized; Withdrawal of U.S. ground forces from Libya in April 2019; The last known U.S. drone strike in Libya took place on September 29, 2019	Barack Obama (January 20, 2009 – January 20, 2017) Donald Trump (January 20, 2017 – January 20, 2021)
US–Iran naval incident (2016) Location: Persian Gulf A U.S. Navy riverine command boat in the Persian Gulf.	United States	Iran	Failed leadership: Two U.S. Navy patrol boats entered Iranian waters near Farsi Island due to navigational errors; Iranian naval forces intercepted the vessels and detained 10 U.S. sailors; Iranian authorities recorded the lead U.S. officer stating, "It was a mistake. That was our fault and we apologize for our mistake"; The apology was broadcast across Iranian news networks shortly after the detention began; Failed leadership; Poor mission planning led to an unauthorized shortcut into Iranian waters, followed by a breakdown in discipline where leadership provided a recorded apology and sensitive information; Sailors released unharmed 15 hours later after negotiations	Barack Obama (January 20, 2009 – January 20, 2017)
SEAL Team Six operation in North Korea (2019) Part of the Korean conflict Location: North Korea SEAL Team Six reached shore of North Korea by SEAL Delivery Vehicle.	United States	North Korea	Operation failed: Covert mission by SEAL Team Six to plant a listening device, to intercept communications from North Korea's leader Kim Jong Un, to provide U.S. president Donald Trump with better intelligence ahead of summit in Vietnam; A Navy SEAL mission in North Korea was aborted after a deadly encounter with fishermen	Donald Trump (January 20, 2017 – January 20, 2021)
Nigeria hostage rescue operation (2020) Part of the Boko Haram insurgency, the war on terror, the Nigerian bandit conflict, and war against the Islamic State Location: Nigeria The hostage rescue operation was conducted by SEAL Team Six.	United States Supported by: Nigeria; Niger	Gunmen	US victory: U.S. Navy SEALs rescued an American citizen, Philip Walton, who had been kidnapped from his home in neighboring Niger; Six of the seven captors were killed	Donald Trump (January 20, 2017 – January 20, 2021)
Russo-Ukrainian war (U.S. involvement) (2022–present) Part of the Russo-Ukrainian War Location: Ukraine, Russia and Black Sea U.S. soldiers load an M777 howitzer onto a C-17 Globemaster III for its shipment to Ukraine at March Air Reserve Base, April 2022.	Ukraine Support and Participation by: United States Supplied by: 54 countries	Russia: Donetsk PR; Luhansk PR; Belarus; North Korea	Ongoing: In February 2022, Russia launched a full-scale military invasion of Ukraine, escalating the conflict that began in 2014; The largest military conflict in Europe since World War II; Large scale of critical U.S. and NATO military aid to Ukraine; U.S. Army have trained thousands members of the Ukrainian armed forces; U.S. aided Ukraine with intelligence; U.S. intelligence helped Ukraine sink Russian warship, shoot down Russian plane and target Russian energy infrastructure; Dozens of U.S. military advisors in Ukraine; American and Ukrainian officers planned Kyiv's counteroffensives	Joe Biden (January 20, 2021 – January 20, 2025) Donald Trump (January 20, 2025 – Incumbent)
Operation Prosperity Guardian (2023–2025) Part of the Red Sea crisis, Middle Eastern crisis, and the Yemeni civil war Location: Red Sea, Gulf of Aden and Yemen Aircraft carrier USS Dwight D. Eisenhower with destroyer USS Laboon involved in Operation Prosperity Guardian together with French frigate Forbin and Italian aircraft carrier Cavour from Operation Aspides in the Red Sea, June 2024.	United States; United Kingdom; Australia; New Zealand; Canada; Denmark; Greece; Netherlands; Norway; Bahrain; Singapore; Sri Lanka Supported by: Seychelles Operation Poseidon Archer: United States; United Kingdom Operation Rough Rider: United States; United Kingdom Support and Participation by: Israel (Note: Israeli attacks in July 2024, September 2024, December 2024, January 2025 and May 2025)	Houthi Yemen (SPC): Ansar Allah	Inconclusive/Other Result: US-led multinational coalition formed in December 2023 to respond to Houthi attacks on commercial vessels in the Red Sea; United States declares Red Sea conflict with Houthis as largest naval battle since World War II; In February 2024, European Union launched own "purely defensive" naval mission Operation Aspides to protect Red Sea vessels from Houthi attacks; Large number of U.S. and allied airstrikes against Houthi-controlled territory in Yemen; US-led Operation Poseidon Archer; US-led Operation Rough Rider; U.S.–Houthi ceasefire; U.S. halt Houthi bombing campaign in Yemen; Houthis agreed not to attack U.S. vessels, but resumed attacks on the commercial shipping; Houthis to continue targeting Israel and Israeli-linked vessels	Joe Biden (January 20, 2021 – January 20, 2025) Donald Trump (January 20, 2025 – Incumbent)
Gaza war (U.S. involvement) (2024–present) Part of the Gaza–Israel conflict, the Gaza Genocide, the Israeli–Palestinian conflict, and the Middle Eastern crisis Location: Gaza Strip and Israel The USS Dwight D. Eisenhower carrier strike group and USS Gerald R. Ford carrier strike groups deployed to the Eastern Mediterranean amid Gaza war, November 2023.	Israel Supported by: United States (Note: See American involvement); Popular Forces	Hamas Supported by: Palestinian Islamic Jihad; Popular Front for the Liberation of Palestine; Democratic Front for the Liberation of Palestine; Al-Aqsa Martyrs' Brigades; Palestinian Mujahideen Movement; Palestinian Freedom Movement; Popular Resistance Committees (Popular Front for the Liberation of Palestine – General Command) PLFP-GC; Abdul al-Qadir al-Husseini Brigades; Jaysh al-Ummah	Ongoing: Israel launched military action in Gaza in response to a large-scale, coordinated attack by Hamas and other Palestinian militant groups; The Pentagon has deployed two aircraft carriers to the Eastern Mediterranean since the attacks on Israel; Large scale of U.S. military aid to Israel; Humanitarian aid for the people of Gaza from the United States since March 2024; The U.S. military planes airdropped aid into Gaza; In May 2024, the U.S. military built a pier off Gaza for $320 million to deliver humanitarian aid; Limited U.S. involvement in the war since October 2024; U.S. helped shoot down Iranian missiles fired at Israel; U.S. stations 100 soldiers to operate advanced anti-missile system in Israel; Attacks on U.S. bases in Iraq, Jordan, and Syria; In February 2025, U.S. president Donald Trump proposed a U.S. takeover of the Gaza Strip; Gaza genocide, more than 70,000 Palestinians killed; Gaza peace plan in October 2025; End of hostage crisis; U.S. deployed 200 troops to create a Civil-Military Coordination Center led by the U.S. to overseer a peaceful transition; The military campaign significantly weakened Hamas while leaving Gaza utterly devastated	Joe Biden (January 20, 2021 – January 20, 2025) Donald Trump (January 20, 2025 – Incumbent)
Hezbollah–Israel conflict (2024–present) Part of the Hezbollah–Israel conflict, the Middle Eastern crisis, and the Iran–Israel conflict during the Syrian civil war Location: Israel, Lebanon and Syria Israeli Air Force F-15 Eagle fighter at its base before launching attacks on targets in Lebanon, September 2024.	Israel Supported by: United States	Hezbollah Supported by: Amal; Islamic Group; SSNP-L; Hamas; PIJ; Popular Resistance Committees; Popular Front for the Liberation of Palestine; Islamic Resistance in Iraq; Ansar Allah; Iran; Syria (until 2024); Islamic Azz Brigades	Ongoing: Israel launched invasion of Lebanon to neutralize the threats posed by Hezbollah at its northern border; Limited U.S. involvement in 2024; U.S. helped shoot down Hezbollah missiles; U.S. aided Israel with intelligence in attacks on Hezbollah; Israeli operations in Lebanon compelled the group to end its involvement in the Gaza war; Hassan Nasrallah, the head of Hezbollah assassinated by Israeli airstrikes; In February 2026, Hezbollah launched missile and drone strikes into Israel during the Iran war; Massive Israeli airstrikes across Lebanon	Joe Biden (January 20, 2021 – January 20, 2025) Donald Trump (January 20, 2025 – Incumbent)
Twelve-Day War (2025) Part of the Middle Eastern crisis Location: Iran, Israel and West Bank U.S. B-2 Spirit stealth bomber aircraft was used in airstrikes against Iran during Operation Midnight Hammer.	Israel; United States	Iran; Ansar Allah	Inconclusive/Other Result: Israel attacked Iran mainly to prevent it from developing nuclear weapons; Limited U.S. involvement at the beginning of the war; U.S. has helped shoot down Iranian missiles; Direct U.S. intervention commenced after a short period of conflict; United States strikes on Iranian nuclear sites under the code name Operation Midnight Hammer; U.S. strikes did not destroy Iran's nuclear program, but set it back; Iranian strikes on US military base in Qatar; Iran–Israel ceasefire; Tensions with Iran continue; Iran–United States negotiations to reach a nuclear peace agreement	Donald Trump (January 20, 2025 – Incumbent)
Operation Southern Spear (2025–present) Part of the crisis in Venezuela, the 2026 Cuban crisis, the Ecuadorian conflict, the war on cartels and the war on terror Location: Caribbean Sea, Pacific Ocean, Venezuela and Ecuador Two U.S. Air Force B-1B Lancer bombers fly in formation during Operation Southern Spear, October 2025.	United States; Ecuador Venezuela (Note: Killing of Niño Guerrero only. Not a part of the Shield of the Americas.) Supported by: Dominican Republic; Trinidad and Tobago; El Salvador; United Kingdom (Note: The UK helped US the seize Russian-flagged Marineratanker. The Royal Air Force provided extra surveillance and navy refueling while capture was under way)	Operation in Venezuela: Venezuela (Note: On December 16, 2025 Trump declared that he would be designating the Maduro regime a terrorist organization in tandem with the blockade of Venezuela.): Cartel of the Suns (alleged) (Note: While the involvement of various Venezuelan government and military officials with drug cartels has been documented, independent experts dispute the existence of an organized cartel run by these officials.); Cuba (Note: 20,000–25,000 Cuban mercenaries in Venezuela. 32 Cuban fighters killed during the 2026 United States strikes in Venezuela) Supported by: Russia; Colombia (alleged) Operation in Ecuador: Organized crime groups, notably Los Choneros Comandos de la Frontera and Tren de Aragua	Ongoing: In August 2025, the U.S. president Donald Trump, authorised the Pentagon to use military force against Latin American drug cartels, whom he designated as narco-terrorists; U.S. military buildup in the Caribbean; Tensions between the United States and Venezuela; U.S. strikes on alleged drug trafficking vessels in the Caribbean and in the Pacific; One narco-submarine was captured; First land strike in December 2025 on a marine facility on the Venezuelan coast; Quarantine and seizures of Venezuelan oil tankers; U.S. bombing of Caracas in January 2026; Capture of Venezuelan President Nicolás Maduro by Delta Force; Beginning of Cuban crisis; U.S. military launched operation in Ecuador; U.S. bombing of drug traffickers in March 2026; On March 7, 2026, the U.S. entered into the Shield of the Americas coalition after the Shield of Americas Summit; On about 12 June 2026, Niño Guerrero the leader of Tren de Aragua was killed in Bolívar, in a joint US and Venezuelan strike	Donald Trump (January 20, 2025 – Incumbent)
Gang attack on the United States Embassy in Haiti (2025) Part of the Haitian conflict and the Haitian crisis Location: Haiti An aerial view of the U.S. Embassy in Port-au-Prince.	United States	Haitian Gangsters	US victory: In November 2025, the U.S. Marines repelled a significant 2025 armed assault on the embassy complex in Port-au-Prince after suspected gang members opened fire on the facility; The U.S. Embassy defended; Gangsters repelled	Donald Trump (January 20, 2025 – Incumbent)
US intervention in Nigeria (2025–2026) Part of the Boko Haram insurgency, Operation Hadin Kai, the war on terror, the Nigerian bandit conflict, and war against the Islamic State Location: Nigeria	United States; Nigeria	Islamic State: West Africa Province (ISWAP); (Islamic State) Boko Haram Bandits	US-allied victory In December 2025, the U.S. launched strikes on Islamic states targets in the Sokoto State in joint cooperation with and on behalf of the government of Nigeria: U.S. Defense Secretary stated that the strikes were related to stopping the killings of Christians in Nigeria; The effectiveness of the strikes was questioned; Abu-Bilal al-Minuki and several of his lieutenants eliminated; Subsequent airstrike on ISWAP and Boko Haram Units; Both ISWAP and Boko Haram continue to be at war with each other; US Withdraws forces from Nigeria, but leaves intelligence assets in place	Donald Trump (January 20, 2025 – Incumbent)
Iran War (2026) Part of the Middle Eastern crisis Iran–United States crisis, 2026 Kurdish–Iranian crisis, and the Russo-Ukrainian war Location: Iran, Indian Ocean Numerous U.S. aircraft sit on the flight deck of USS Abraham Lincoln in support of Operation Epic Fury, February 2026.	United States; Israel Saudi Arabia; United Arab Emirates; Kuwait Bahrain Coalition of Political Forces of Iranian Kurdistan Yemen (Presidential Leadership Council) (Note: On 13 July 2026, the Yemeni government, alongside Saudi Arabia, conducted airstrikes targeting the Houthi-controlled Sanaa International Airport. The Yemeni Ministry of Defense later confirmed their direct involvement, stating the operation specifically targeted the runway to prevent an Iranian aircraft from landing.) Ukraine (Note: On 25 July, Ukraine struck an Iranian vessel transporting military cargo from Russia to Iran in the Caspian Sea, killing at least one sailor. Both Iran and Ukraine have confirmed the incident.) Attacked by Iran: Azerbaijan Iraq: Kurdistan Region; Jordan; Lebanon; Oman; Qatar; Syria; Turkiye; United Kingdom: Akrotiri and Dhekelia; British Indian Ocean Territory	Iran; Hezbollah; Houthis; Popular Mobilization Forces; Islamic Resistance in Iraq Attacked by Israel: Islamic Group; Hamas; Palestinian Islamic Jihad	Ongoing: Failure of Iran–United States negotiations to reach a nuclear peace agreement; United States military buildup in the Middle East; U.S. forces attacked Iran's nuclear and ballistic missile infrastructure as part of a campaign to degrade its strategic capabilities; Strikes on multiple targets in Iran; Ali Khamenei, the supreme leader of Iran assassinated by airstrikes; Number of Iranian officials killed; U.S. submarine sunk Iranian ship in first torpedo kill since World War II; Iranian strikes on Azerbaijan, Bahrain, Cyprus, Iraq, Israel, Jordan, Kurdistan Region, Kuwait, Oman, Qatar, Saudi Arabia and UAE; Strait of Hormuz closed by Iranian Navy; Strait of Hormuz campaign; Global economic disruption; Hezbollah launched missile and drone strikes into Israel; Massive Israeli airstrikes across Lebanon; Israel–Lebanon ceasefire; Terrorist Attacks abroad; U.S. pilot rescue operation in Iran; Naval blockade of Iran; Operation Project Freedom; Islamabad Memorandum	Donald Trump (January 20, 2025 – Incumbent)
Attack on the US consulate in Karachi (2026) Part of Pro-Iranian protests during the 2026 Israeli–United States strikes on Iran and Anti-American sentiment in Pakistan Location: Pakistan U.S. Consulate in Karachi.	United States; Pakistan	Armed Shia Muslim protesters	US victory: On March 1, 2026, a group of Shia protestors, protesting the Iran War breached the walls and attacked the United States consulate in Karachi; The U.S. Marine Security Guards opened fire, killing 10–16 protesters and injuring over 60; Pakistan Rangers and Sindh Police dispersed the crowd	Donald Trump (January 20, 2025 – Incumbent)

== See also ==
- List of notable deployments of U.S. military forces overseas
- Timeline of United States military operations
- Military history of the United States
- United States Armed Forces
- List of American military installations
- List of United States drone bases
