= United States intervention in Somalia =

US military intervention against extremist groups in Somalia

- Part of the war on terror, Operation Enduring Freedom – Horn of Africa, and the Somali Civil War
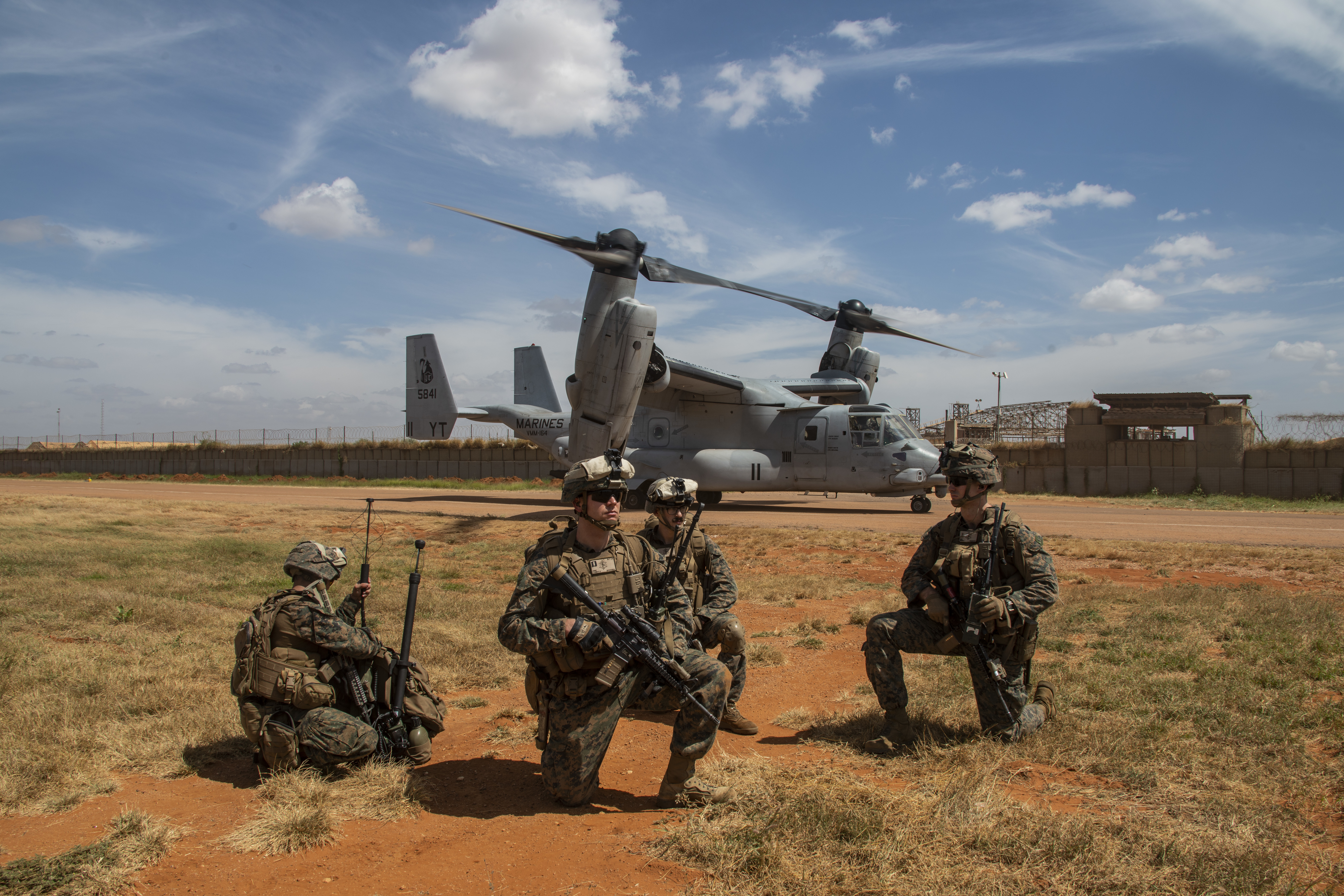
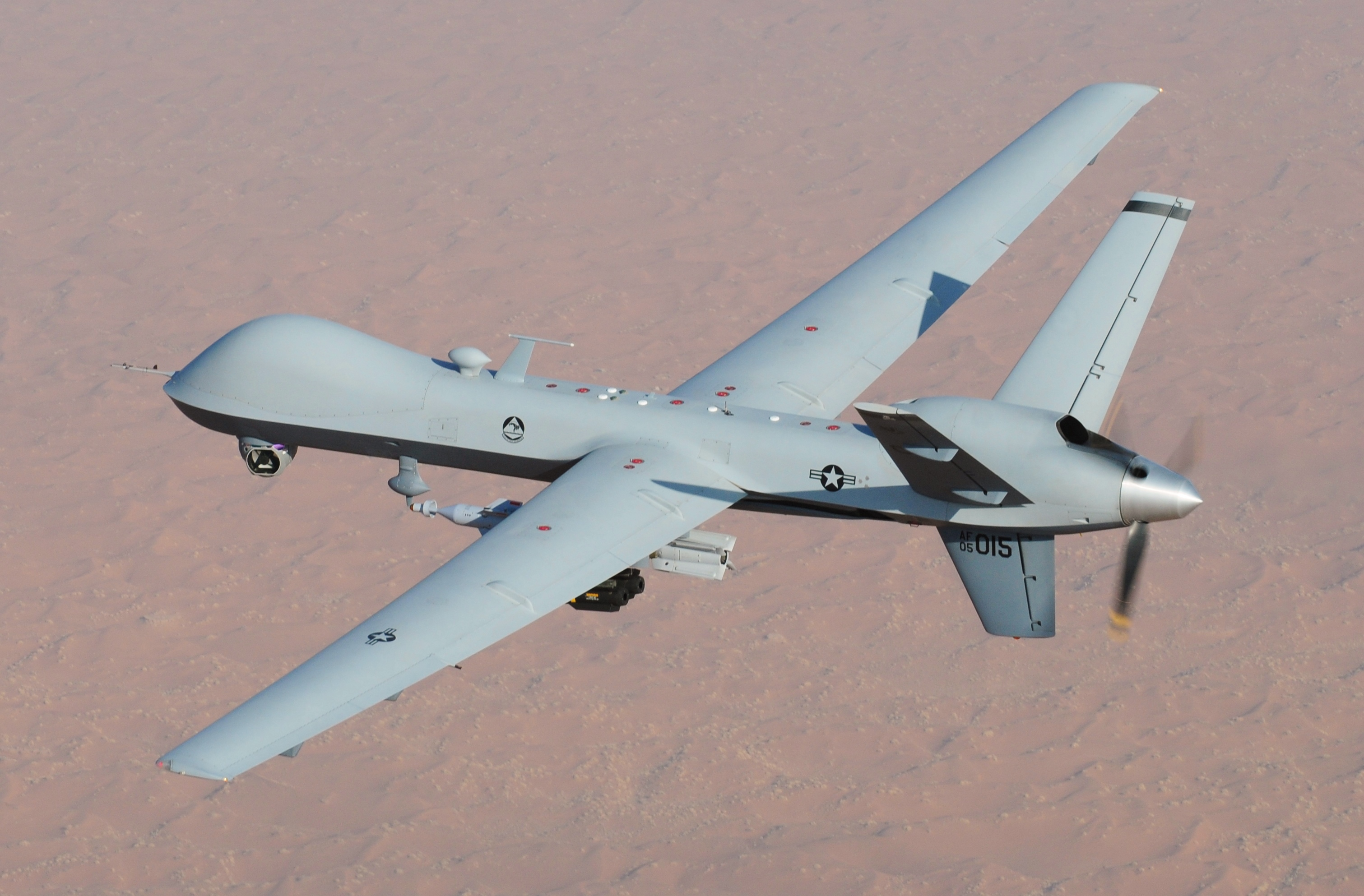
- Clockwise from top: U.S. Marines at Baledogle Airfield; Members of the East Africa Response Force using night vision during an operation in Somalia; MQ-9 Reaper UAV - often used in Somalia for drone strikers
Date	January 7, 2007 – present (19 years, 10 months and 3 days)
Location	Somalia
Status	Ongoing; US-backed Ethiopian invasion and rise of Al-Shabaab (2006–2009); African Union intervention (2007–2022); Kenyan intervention (2011–2012); Establishment of Federal Government of Somalia (2012); Withdrawal of majority of US ground troops (2021); Redeployment of US ground troops (2022); US support for Somali forces and multinational African Union force with drone strikes, intelligence, and training; US military operations in Puntland against ISIS

Belligerents
United States; US Army; US Marine Corps; US Air Force; US Navy; CIA; In support of: Ethiopia; Somalia; Puntland (African Union) ATMIS (since 2022): Burundi; Djibouti; Ethiopia; Kenya; Uganda; (African Union) AMISOM (until 2022): Burundi; Djibouti (from 2011); Ethiopia (from 2006); Ghana; Kenya (from 2011, officially from 2012); Nigeria (from 2010); Sierra Leone (from 2013); Uganda (until 2017)	Islamic Courts Union (until 2009); Alliance for the Re-liberation of Somalia (until 2009); al-Shabaab; al-Qaeda; Alleged support: Iran; North Korea; Hizbul Islam (until 2009–10; 2012–14); Islamic State; Somalia Province

Commanders and leaders
(United States) Donald Trump (2017–2021, 2025–); (United States) Joe Biden (2021–2025); (United States) Barack Obama (2009–2017); (United States) George W. Bush (2007–2009); (United States) Pete Hegseth (2025–); (United States) Lloyd Austin (2021–2025); (United States) Mark Esper (2019–2020); (United States) Jim Mattis (2017–2019); (United States) Ash Carter (2015–2017); (United States) Chuck Hagel (2013–2015); (United States) Leon Panetta (2011–2013); (United States) Robert Gates (2007–2011)	(Al-Shabaab (militant group)) Ahmed Diriye; (Al-Shabaab (militant group)) Fuad Qalaf (former); (Al-Shabaab (militant group)) Mukhtar Robow (surrendered); (Al-Shabaab (militant group)) Moktar Ali Zubeyr †; (Al-Shabaab (militant group)) Hassan Abdullah Hersi al-Turki #; (Al-Shabaab (militant group)) Mohamed Said Atom (surrendered); (Al-Shabaab (militant group)) Ibrahim Haji Jama Mee'aad (executed); Hassan Dahir Aweys (surrendered); Sharif Ahmed; Ibrahim Addow; Abdullahi Afrah †; Abdirahman Janaqow; Abdilqadir Ali Omar; Madobe (POW); Abu Mansoor Al-Amriki †; (al-Qaeda) Saleh Ali Saleh Nabhan †; (al-Qaeda) Fazul Abdullah Mohammed †; (Islamic State) Abdul Qadir Mumin; (Islamic State) Abu Hafs al-Hashimi al-Qurashi; (Islamic State) Abu al-Hussein al-Husseini al-Qurashi †; (Islamic State) Abu al-Hasan al-Hashimi al-Qurashi †; (Islamic State) Abu Ibrahim al-Hashimi al-Qurashi †; (Islamic State) Abu Bakr al-Baghdadi X; (Islamic State) Mahad Maalin †; (Islamic State) Abdihakim Mohamed Ibrahim ("Dhoqob") †

Strength
450 personnel	Al-Shabaab: 7,000–9,000 fighters (Dec 2017)

Casualties and losses
3 service members killed 2 contractors killed 1 CIA paramilitary officer killed 5 wounded 5 aircraft destroyed 1 aircraft damaged 2 Oshkosh M-ATV several fuel tanker destroyed	1,879-2,495 militants killed
- 35–135 civilians killed (per New America); 22 Galmudug soldiers mistakenly killed 78–153 civilians killed (per Airwars)

Since the mid-2000s, the United States has provided military support to the Ethiopian National Defence Force, African Union troops, the Somali Transitional Federal Government (TFG) and its successor, the Federal Government of Somalia (FGS), in their conflicts with Somali Islamist non-state actors.

U.S. military involvement in Somalia dates back to the 1990s with the UNITAF and UNOSOM II operations. With the global war on terror in the early 2000s, renewed U.S. military action was framed as counterterrorism. Successive administrations under George W. Bush, Barack Obama, Donald Trump, and Joe Biden have conducted airstrikes, special forces missions, intelligence operations, and training programs against Islamist groups in the country.

In the early 2000s, the Islamic Courts Union (ICU) emerged as a major political and military force, becoming the de facto government over much of southern Somalia by mid-2006 after defeating a CIA-backed coalition of warlords. The U.S. backed the Ethiopian invasion of Somalia aimed at regime change against the ICU and installing the weak Ethiopian backed Transitional Federal Government in its place. U.S. aircraft, special forces and intelligence assets were covertly deployed in support of Ethiopian troops advancing on Mogadishu in 2006. Following the overthrow of the ICU government, an Islamist insurgency emerged in 2007 and brought the Ethiopian military occupation to an end in early 2009, during which the al-Shabaab evolved into a powerful insurgent actor.

U.S. support for the Ethiopian invasion resulted in the growth of an intense anti-American sentiment. The war had significantly increased popular hostility to both the United States and Ethiopia, while strengthening the Islamic movements' most radical elements. By the US military's own assessment, the war had been poorly prosecuted. American forces have been engaged in counterinsurgency operations against the al-Shabaab throughout the present post-Ethiopian occupation phase of the Somali Civil War (2009–present).

In late 2020, President Donald Trump announced the withdrawal of most US troops from Somalia. In May 2022, President Joe Biden redeployed US soldiers. The Somali government has asked for U.S. involvement support on numerous occasions in recent years. The United States Army stationed in Puntland's Bari region are currently supporting the ongoing anti-ISIS campaign. During 2025 the Trump administration drastically escalated the number of airstrikes.

Amnesty International concluded that the actual number of U.S. airstrikes conducted in Somalia exceeded officially reported figures, and that AFRICOM has repeatedly misclassified Somali civilians killed in these strikes as "terrorists".

== Background ==
Since 2007, the United States Africa Command has targeted Islamist groups, mainly al-Shabaab, within Somalia using airstrikes and special forces operations. These have included targeted drone strikes and United States Navy missile strikes. Special forces teams have conducted raids and acted as advisors.

=== Ethiopian invasion of Somalia (2006) ===
The rise of the Islamic Courts Union (ICU) during the early 2000s, along with the growing insurgency in the Ogaden waged by the Ogaden National Liberation Front, raised Ethiopian concerns of an eventual renewed drive for Somali unification. A strong Somali state not dependent on Addis Ababa was perceived as a security threat, and consequently the Ethiopian government heavily backed the formation of the Transitional Federal Government (TFG) in 2004 on the grounds that it would give up Somalia's long standing claim to the Ogaden.

During the early years of the war on terror, the U.S. government perceived the rise of an Islamic movement in Somalia as a potential terror risk. From 2003 onwards, the Central Intelligence Agency (CIA) initiated covert operations against the Islamic Courts Union, aiming to depose them from power. After taking over Mogadishu from warlords in 2006, the ICU leadership sent a cable to Washington stating that they were not a "Taliban-type" movement and had no interest in being enemies with the United States.

Channel 4 acquired a leaked document detailing a confidential meeting between senior American and Ethiopian officials in Addis Ababa six months prior to the full scale December 2006 invasion. Participants deliberated on various scenarios, with the 'worst-case scenario' being the potential takeover of Somalia by the Islamic Courts Union. The documents revealed that the US found the prospect unacceptable and would back Ethiopia in the event of an ICU takeover. Journalist Jon Snow reported that during the meeting ‘the blueprint for a very American supported Ethiopian invasion of Somalia was hatched’. No Somali officials were involved in the discussions.

Before the invasion, United States Assistant Secretary of State issued a statement openly accusing the ICU leadership of being members of Al-Qaeda. Herman Cohen, the US Assistant Secretary of State for African Affairs, noted the US decision making had been influenced by false Ethiopian intelligence. According to Ted Dagne, an Africa specialist for the US Congressional Research Service, the Islamic Courts had committed no act or provocation to initiate the Ethiopian invasion. American historian William R. Polk observes that the invasion had been unprovoked.

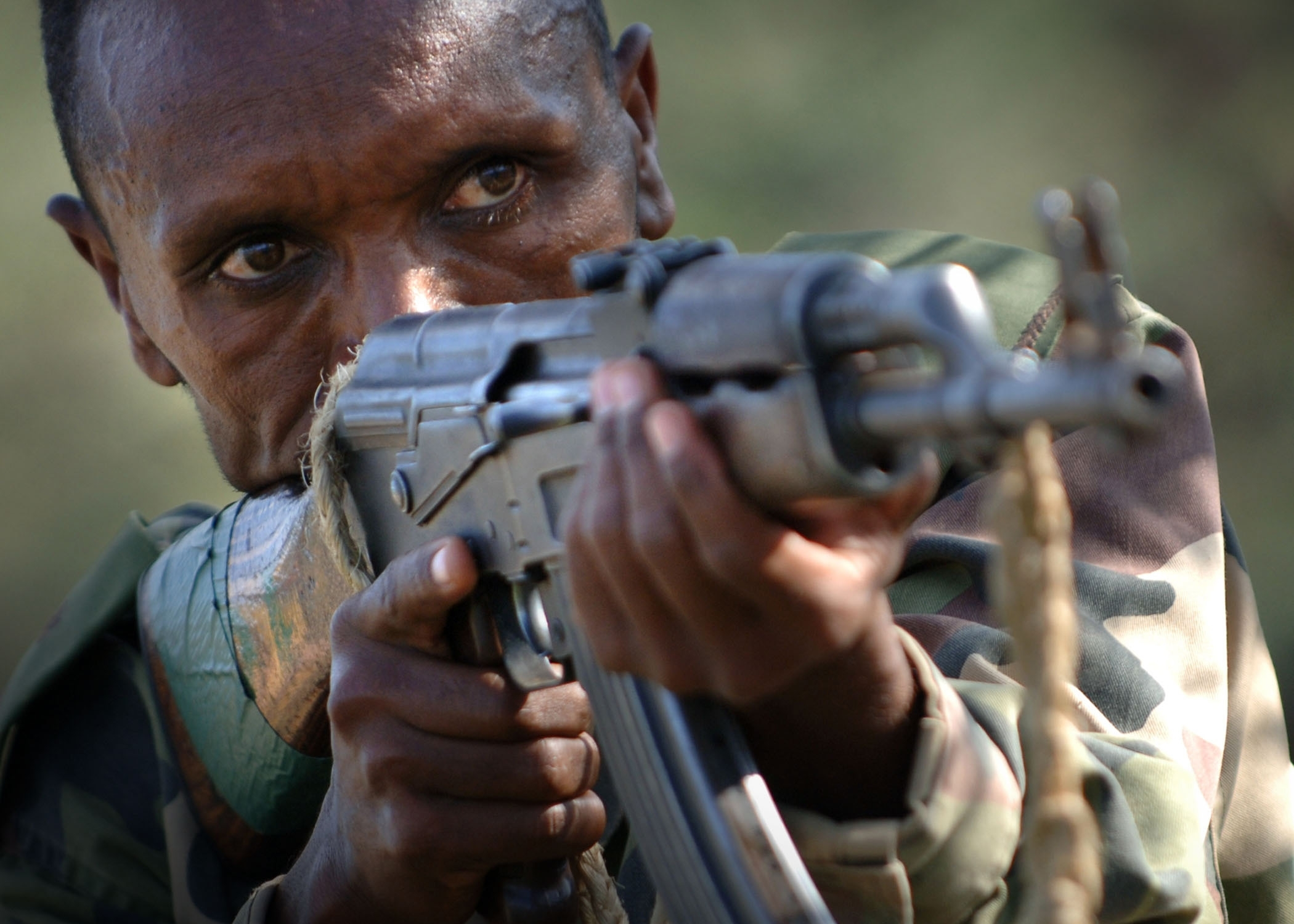
Ethiopian National Defense Force soldier training with the U.S. troops in Hurso, Somali Region of Ethiopia (Dec 2006)

Approximately 50,000 to 60,000 Ethiopian National Defence Force (ENDF) troops backed by tanks, helicopter gunships and jets had been involved in the offensive against the Islamic Courts Union during December 2006. During the invasion phase of the war, US Special Forces, CIA paramilitary units, and Marine units, supported by American AC-130s and helicopter gunships, directly intervened in support of the ENDF. The US Bush administration doubted Ethiopia's ability to effectively use new equipment it had provided for the invasion. As a result, it decided to involve US Special Forces and CIA agents in the campaign. Pentagon officials and intelligence analysts reported that the invasion had been planned during the summer of 2006 and that US special forces were on the ground before the Ethiopians had intervened.

The participation of the US ground and air forces provided the ENDF with massive military superiority over the ICU. Ali Gedi, then prime minister of the TFG and a participant in planning for the invasion noted that, “The Ethiopians were not able to come in without the support of the US Government...American air forces were supporting us." In an interview with Al-Jazeera, head of the Islamic Courts Sharif Sheikh Ahmed later reported that after achieving a string of battlefield victories, ICU troops had come under unexpected bombardment from US aircraft. US operations during the invasion took place in a media vacuum, with no images or footage appearing of American forces.

== Ethiopian military occupation (2007–2009) ==
During January 2007, American gunships, including helicopters and the AC-130, flew out of Dire Dawa and Diego Garcia to provide air support for Ethiopian troops. The USS Dwight D. Eisenhower carrier battlegroup (Carrier Strike Group Eight) was dispatched to the Somali coast to provide further air support and aerial surveillance. US Special forces and CIA paramilitary units also participated.

As the Islamic Courts Union withdrew deep into southern Somalia US Lockheed AC-130 gunships covertly flying out of Ethiopia struck ICU convoys. American forces reportedly killed hundreds of Somali fighters and civilians in a 'killing zone' between the Kenyan border, the Indian Ocean and advancing US backed Ethiopian troops. US airstrikes focused on decapitating the ICU leadership, in one instance killing Sheikh Abdullahi Nahar, a popular leader of the movement. Cruise missiles were fired at ICU positions on 8 January 2007. Local residents in the Afmadow district of southern Somalia reported witnessing AC-130's pursuing and killing ICU troops. In one airstrike carried out by an AC-130 gunship operating from an airbase in eastern Ethiopia, US forces targeted the ICU governor of Jubbaland, Ahmed Madobe. Madobe survived the airstrike but was later captured by American and Ethiopian forces who landed by helicopter. American air power was used against villages in southern Somalia, resulting in significant civilian casualties and displacement. In one attack seventy-three nomadic herders and their livestock were killed in a US air strike and in another, US aircraft bombed a wedding ceremony.

The United States admitted to conducting a strike against targets that they claimed were suspected Al-Qaeda operatives. An admission to a second air attack was made later in January. The Pentagon's announcement of air attacks in Somalia during the Ethiopian offensive confirmed the belief of many analysts that the US was involved in the invasion. Initially, the US claimed that it had successfully targeted Al-Qaeda operatives responsible for the 1998 embassy bombings, but later downgraded those who had been killed in the attacks as being 'associates with terrorists' instead. United Nations Secretary-General Ban Ki-moon publicly expressed concern that the American attacks would escalate the conflict. After American involvement in the invasion became public knowledge, the Ethiopian government halted US AC-130 attacks from its military bases.

US airstrikes during the invasion failed at getting any Al-Qaeda operatives alleged to be present, instead killing civilians and Islamic fighters who had never been accused of any crime. Richard Cornwell, a senior research fellow at the Institute for Security Studies in Pretoria criticized the American airstrikes on the grounds that it was "highly hypocritical" to launch attacks on alleged terrorists regardless of Somali civilian casualties.

=== Rise of Al-Shabaab ===
In March 2007, a White House study found that "despite the ouster" of the Islamic Court Union, Somalia was a growing regional security threat and "safe haven for terrorists". As a result of the US supported invasion, Al-Shabaab morphed from a fringe movement to a serious insurgent force. Many Islamic Courts Union affiliates had been killed during the invasion, leaving a vacuum for the small group of several hundred youth that served as the ICU's Shabaab militia to gain prominence. During the military occupation, Al-Shabaab garnered substantial support from the Somali population, cutting across clan lines. The Ethiopian invasion was the group's primary catalyst for mobilization among the population. Despite its strict ideology, the group was widely perceived as a genuine resistance force against Ethiopian occupation by many Somalis, and while not universally popular, it was widely acknowledged for its effective training and formidable capabilities in pushing out Ethiopian troops. Heavy handed tactics and blatant disregard for civilian life by Ethiopian troops rallied many Somalis to support the Al-Shabaab as it successfully branded itself as the most determined and uncompromising resistance faction.

A sharp increase in radical recruitment in Somali diaspora in Europe and the United States since 2007 has been linked with the overthrow of the ICU and the Ethiopian military occupation. This later resulted in the first ever American suicide bomber carrying out an attack in Somalia during October 2008.

During June 2007, the USS Chafee fired a dozen rounds and possibly one cruise missile at the coast of Bargal, in northern Somalia. The strikes targeted 35 militants that had landed on the coast and had begun to fire on local forces. U.S. officials told The New York Times that U.S. operatives were on the ground, leading to the American warship firing in self-defense. Eight to twelve militants, including foreign fighters, were killed.

=== 2008 ===
On 3 March 2008, the United States launched cruise missiles on the town of Dhobley where insurgent leader Hassan Turki was reported to have been present. According to AP, US officials claimed the town was held by Islamic extremists but gave few details to the press. The attack was reportedly carried out by US Navy submarine. Dhobley was the last town the ICU held a year prior and it had been bombed by US aircraft in that period. At 3:25 a.m, two or three BGM-109 Tomahawk cruise missiles were launched at Dhobley. The Department of Defense initially refused to identify the targets of the attack. The strikes killed four people and wounded 20. Residents said that civilian targets were hit by an AC-130 gunship. Dobley district commissioner Ali Hussein Nuir stated that Sheikh Hassan Abdullah Hersi al-Turki, a local militant cleric was meeting with leaders of a Mogadishu-based militant group nearby.

On 18 March 2008, the United States designated Al-Shabaab a terrorist organization. The move proved to be damaging as it isolated moderate voices among the Islamist resistance movement and gave Al-Shabaab further reason to push against peace talks.

A month later on 1 May 2008, US Tomahawk missiles bombarded Dhusamareb resulting in the assassination of Al-Shabaab leader Aden Hashi Ayro - along with another senior commander and several civilians. Four cruise missiles launched by a U.S. Navy warship struck a compound in Dhusamareb, with some reports suggesting that an AC-130 was also involved in the operation. The attack purportedly caused al-Shabaab to ban the use of mobile phones by its fighters. The attack did nothing to slow down the group's participation in the insurgency. The assassination of Ayro during early 2008 resulted in a sharp radicalization of Al-Shabaab. The killing of Ayro led to foreign fighters integrating within the ranks of the organization, and resulted in the accession of Ahmed Godane as Emir. This change in leadership was facilitated by American intervention and had significant effect on Shabaab's future decision making regarding the usage of tactics such as suicide bombing.

After the killing of the group's leader Aden Hashi Ayro in 2008, Al-Shabaab began publicly courting Osama bin Laden in a bid to become part of Al-Qaeda, but was rebuffed by bin Laden. Several months after the ENDF withdrawal, Foreign Affairs noted that Al-Qaeda's foothold in Somalia post-occupation was in significant part the result of the invasion. Following the killing of Osama bin Laden in 2011, Al-Shabaab members pledged allegiance to Al-Qaeda in 2012.

=== Result and consequences ===
In January 2009, Ethiopia ended its occupation of Somalia and withdrew from the country. By the end of the occupation, the majority of the territory seized from the Islamic Courts Union during the December 2006 and January 2007 invasion had fallen under the control of various Islamist and nationalist resistance groups. The invasion failed to empower the Transitional Federal Government, which only controlled parts of Mogadishu and its original 2006 capital of Baidoa by the last weeks of the military occupation. The Ethiopian army withdrew from Somalia with significant casualties and little to show for their efforts. The insurgency had achieved its primary goal of removing the Ethiopian military presence from most of Somalia by November 2008 and was successful in achieving several of its most important demands.

During 2007 and 2008, Somalia plunged into severe levels of armed conflict, marked by frequent assassinations, political meltdown, radicalization, and the growth of an intense anti-American sentiment. The situation in the country exceeded the worst-case scenarios envisioned by many regional analysts when they first considered the potential impact of an Ethiopian military occupation. A Royal Institute of International Affairs report observed that Ethiopian/American support for the TFG instead of the more popular Islamic Courts administration presented an obstacle, not contribution, to the reconstruction of Somalia. For the Americans the invasion had resulted in nearly the complete opposite of what had been expected, as it had failed to isolate the Islamic movement while solidifying Somali anger to both the United States and Ethiopia. The result of the invasion had been the defeat of Somali Islamists considered to be 'moderate' while strengthening the movements most radical elements. By the US military's own metrics, the war in Somalia was never effectively prosecuted. A 2007 study commissioned by United States Department of Defense warned that American participation in the war was, "...plagued by a failure to define the parameters of the conflict or its aims; an overemphasis on military measures without a clear definition of the optimal military strategy;"

== Somali Civil War (2009–present) ==
=== 2009 ===
- September 14

Operation Celestial Balance – After several strikes by warplanes, U.S. commandos launch a helicopter raid near the southern coastal town of Barawa, killing Saleh Ali Saleh Nabhan after his convoy was tracked as it left Mogadishu to attend a meeting between Islamic militants.

=== 2011 ===
- April 3–6

During fighting in Dhobley between Somali forces and al-Shabaab militants, an airstrike took place which killed al-Qaeda commander Jabreel Malik Muhammed. This followed an eighteen month long gap in U.S. strikes in the area.

- June 23

In the first reported lethal drone strike conducted in Somalia, U.S. forces struck a training camp south of Kismayo, which was said to have resulted in the death of senior al-Shabaab leader, Ibrahim al-Afghani. However, Stratfor reported in August that Afghani was still alive and had replaced Ahmed Abdi Godane as the emir of al-Shabaab. Afghani has not appeared in public since.

- July 6

Early in the morning, U.S. drones hit three al-Shabaab training camps in Afmadow. The United States did not claim responsibility for the attack.

- September 15

Three explosions were heard after Kismayo residents reported aircraft flying over the town. Residents reported the aircraft having struck a forested area where militants were believed to have established a training camp. The aircraft were most likely American warplanes.

- September 25

A series of drone strikes targeted al-Shabaab militants in Kismayo.

- October 6

A drone strike targeted al-Shabaab militants who were retreating into Dolbiyow Village. The attack killed four Somali farmers.

- October 13

A drone struck an al-Shabaab base near Tabda village.

- October 22

A US drone attacked on Afmadow.

- October 23

The US and French conducted airstrikes in Kismayo.

=== 2012 ===
- January 21

Three missiles fired by a drone killed the British–Lebanese militant Bilal al-Berjawi known as Abu Hafsa while he was driving in a car outside Mogadishu.

- February 24

US drone strike targeted a vehicle carrying a senior commander killed seven militants in Lower Shabelle, including a prominent Moroccan, and a deputy of Bilah, al-Berjawi.

- August 23

US airstrikes were reportedly conducted into the town of Qandala.

=== 2013 ===
- October 28

2 Islamists killed in drone attack included senior al-Shabaab leader Ibrahim Ali Abdi.

=== 2014 ===
- September 1

US drones and conventional aircraft targeted al-Shabaab encampments and vehicles. Leader Ahmed Abdi Godane was killed in the strike.

- December 29

US drone strike killed a senior leader of al-Shabaab known as Abdishakur, the group's intelligence chief.

=== 2015 ===
- January 31

Forty-five to sixty al-Shabaab members were reportedly killed in a US drone strike in Lower Shabelle, after explosions rocked a training camp, a house, and several armored vehicles. The U.S. denied its involvement in the strikes. It was the most lethal American attack in Somalia against radical Islamists to date.

In a second strike, senior al-Shabaab leader Yusef Dheeq and an associate were killed while riding in a vehicle.

- March 10

US drones targeted two al-Shabaab training camps.

- March 12

Adan Garaar, senior member of al-Shabaab and suspect in the Kenyan Westgate shopping mall attack, was killed in a drone strike that destroyed two vehicles.

- July 15–18

Drones struck in Bardera.

- November 22

A US strike targeted an al-Shabaab base in southern Somalia.

- November 29

Either Kenyan or American planes bombed three villages in central Hiraan.

- December 2

Senior al-Shabaab fighter Abdirahman Sandhere (Ukash) was killed in an airstrike.

- December 22

Al-Shabaab leader Abu Ubaidah was killed in a drone strike.

=== 2016 ===
US forces conducted 15 airstrikes in Somalia during 2016

- March 5

A massive U.S. airstrike involving multiple aircraft, manned and unmanned, targeted a training camp near the town of Raso (Buloburde District) killing an estimated 150 al-Shabaab militants. According to U.S. military officials, the American warplanes struck a large gathering of fighters as they were massing in preparation for an attack.

- March 8

A US helicopter assisted Somali Special Forces who had attacked an al-Shabaab target in southern Somalia.

- March 31

A US drone strike targeted three al-Shabaab vehicles in southern Somalia.

- April 1

US airstrikes targeted al-Shabaab militants.

- April 2

Two US strikes killed six in southern Somalia.

- April 6

A US drone strike in Jilib left eight people dead.

- April 11

A US drone struck an al-Shabaab camp in southern Somalia killing 12 militants.

- May 9–10

The United States, alongside Kenyan and Somali forces, conducted a raid in Toratorow. It was reported that helicopters were also used in the raid.

- May 12

A US airstrike killed five al-Shabaab members.

- May 27

Senior al-Shabaab leader Abdullahi Haji Daud was killed in a drone strike.

- June 11

Reportedly, US jets struck al-Shabaab targets in the northern autonomous region of Puntland.

- June 21

3 al-Shabaab members were killed in drone strike.

- August 30

Two militants were killed in a drone strike near Gobanale.

- September 5

Four militants were killed near the town of Tortoroow, in two "self-defense" strikes.

- September 26

U.S. officials saed four al-Shabaab fighters were killed by airstrikes after they attacked a joint U.S.-Somali force near Kismayo.

- September 28

U.S. aircraft mistakenly targeted local militia members in the Puntland region, killing at least 22 Galmudug soldiers, as well as some Islamist fighters. The strike led to demonstrations in Galkayo that saw protesters burn the American flag.

=== 2017 ===
US forces conducted 35 airstrikes in Somalia during 2017

- January 7

Self defense strikes were conducted against al-Shabaab militants in Gaduud, but there were no fatalities.

- May 5

A US Navy Seal was killed and three others wounded including a Somali-American interpreter during a raid in Barii. Four to eight al-Shabaab militants were killed in the raid. It was the first time a US service member died by combat in Somalia since 1993

- June 11

An airstrike killed eight al-Shabaab militants 185 miles southwest of Mogadishu.

- July 2

A kinetic strike killed one al-Shabaab militant in the Lower Shabelle region.

- July 5

A self defense strike 300 miles southwest of Mogadishu killed 13 al-Shabaab militants and wounded 10 more. The strike came after a Somali military base was attacked.

- July 29

A kinetic strike killed one al-Shabaab fighter, later identified as Ali Muhammad, in Southern Somalia.

- August 10

US forces conducted two kinetic strikes with an unknown result.

- August 16–17

Three defense strikes killed seven al-Shabaab militants 200 miles southwest of Mogadishu. The strikes were called in after US and Somali special forces were fired upon while conducting a counter terrorism operation. Reports stated that seven civilians had been killed by warplanes in Jilib. AFRICOM denied the allegations and called the reports "unreliable".

- August 25

US and Somali commandoes reportedly killed ten unarmed civilians including three children and a woman during a raid. The Somali Army admitted mistakenly killing the civilians. Africa Command denied the casualty allegations stating that only enemy combatants were killed in the raid.

- August 31

A drone strike near Barawe killed an al-Shabaab and injured one other fighter.

- September 5

A precision strike killed three al-Shabaab militants in central Somalia.

- September 7

A precision strike killed one Al-Shabaab militant.

- September 13

Three precision airstrikes killed six al-Shabaab militants in southern Somalia.

- November 3

Up to 20 ISIS fighters were killed by airstrikes in Puntland, northeastern Somalia. It is believed to have been the first time the US targeted the Islamic State in Somalia.

- November 9

Several al-Shabaab militants were killed by an airstrike in southern Somalia.

- November 10

A US airstrike killed up to 13 al-Shabaab militants in Lower Shabelle according to a Somali official .

- November 11

One al-Shabaab fighter was killed by airstrike near Gaduud.

- November 14

Several al-Shabaab militants were killed by airstrike 60 miles northwest of Mogadishu.

- November 9–14

Airstrikes killed up to 40 militants per United States Africa Command.

- November 21

An airstrike targeting an al-Shabaab training camp killed over 100 militants 125 miles northwest of Mogadishu.

- November 27

One ISIS fighter was killed by airstrike in northeastern Somalia.

- December 12

An airstrike destroyed a vehicle-borne improvised explosive device 65 kilometers Southwest of Mogadishu.

- December 15

An airstrike killed eight al-Shabaab fighters and destroyed one vehicle 30 miles northwest of Mogadishu.

- December 24

An airstrike in southern Somalia killed 13 al-Shabaab militants.

- December 27

An airstrike killed four al-Shabaab militants and destroyed one vehicle-borne improvised explosive device, 25 kilometers west of Mogadishu.

=== 2018 ===
US forces conducted 47 airstrikes in Somalia during 2018, killing between 326 and 338 people

- January 2

Airstrike killed two al-Shabaab militants and destroyed one vehicle-borne explosive 50 kilometers West of Mogadishu.

- January 18

Airstrike killed four al-Shabaab militants 50 kilometers Northwest of Kismayo.

- February 19

Airstrike killed three al-Shabaab militants in Jilib.

- February 21

Airstrike killed five al-Shabaab militants in Jamaame.

- February 26

Airstrike killed two al-Shabaab militants and wounded one in Jilib.

- March 13

Airstrike in Jamecco killed 12 al-Shabaab militants and injured 15.

- March 19

Airstrike against al-Shabaab militants killed two, wounded three, and destroyed one vehicle in near Mubaarak.

- April 1

An airstrike near El Burr killed four al-Shabaab militants and two civilians. It was the first time the US military acknowledged civilian deaths in Somalia.

- April 5

Airstrike near jilib killed three al-Shabaab militants and destroyed one vehicle.

- April 11

Airstrike destroyed an al-Shabaab vehicle-borne explosive device near Jana Cabdalle.

- May 23

Airstrike killed 10 al-Shabaab militants 15 miles Southwest of Mogadishu.

- May 31

Airstrike killed 12 al-Shabaab militants 30 miles Southeast of Mogadishu.

- June 2

Airstrike killed 27 al-Shabaab militants 26 miles Southwest of Bosasso.

- June 8

One US soldier killed, four wounded and one partner force wounded in al-Shabaab mortar attack in Jubaland.

- August 2

Four al-Shabaab militants killed by airstrike 74 miles Northwest of Mogadishu.

- August 21

Airstrike killed two al-Shabaab militants 46 kilometers Northeast of Kismayo.

- August 27

Three al-Shabaab militants killed by airstrike 40 kilometers Southwest of Mogadishu.

- September 11

Two al-Shabaab militants killed and one wounded by airstrike in Mubaraak.

- September 21

Airstrike killed 18 al-Shabaab militants 50 kilometers Northwest of Kismayo.

- October 1

Nine al-Shabaab militants killed and one wounded by airstrike 40 kilometers Northwest of Kismayo.

- October 6

Airstrike kills one al-Shabaab militant in Kunyo Barrow.

- October 12

Airstrike in Harardere killed around 60 al-Shabaab militants. It was the largest strike in Somalia since November 2017.

- October 14

Self-defense strike killed four al-Shabaab militants in Araara.

- October 25

Airstrike killed two al-Shabaab militants and wounded one in Kunyo Barrow.

- November 3

Self-defense strike killed four al-Shabaab militants in Araara.

- November 19

Two airstrikes killed 37 al-Shabaab militants and destroy one training camp in Debatscile These strikes put the number of US airstrikes in Somalia to 31 during the year 2018.

- November 20

Airstrike in Quy Cad killed seven al-Shabaab militants.

- November 21

Airstrike in Harardhere killed six al-Shabaab militants. A second strike would destroy an al-Shabaab weapons cache in Harardhere.

- November 27

Airstrike in Debatscile (Hobyo District) killed three al-Shabaab militants.

- November 30

Airstrike killed nine al-Shabaab militants near Lebede (Burhakaba District).

- December 4

Self-defense strike killed four al-Shabaab militants in Awdheegle.

- December 9

Self-defense strike killed four al-Shabaab militants in Basra.

- December 15

Four airstrikes in Gondershe targeting camp and vehicles killed 34 al-Shabaab militants.

- December 16

Two airstrikes in Gandarshe kill 28 al-Shabaab militants.

- December 19

Two airstrikes in Beled Amin killed 11 al-Shabaab militants.

=== 2019 ===
US forces have conducted a record of more than 60 airstrikes in Somalia during 2019, killing 913–1,011 al-Shabaab militants

- January 2

Airstrike killed 10 al-Shabaab militants in Dheerow Sanle (Dinsoor District).

- January 7

Two self-defense strikes killed four al-Shabaab militants in Baqdaad.

- January 8

Airstrike killed six al-Shabaab militants and destroyed one vehicle in Yaaq Braawe, Bay Region.

- January 19

Airstrike targeted a large group of al-Shabaab fighters attacking Somali National Army troops near Jilib killing 52 militants.

- January 23

Two airstrikes were conducted in Jilib with at least one al-Shabaab militant killed. Africa Command also announced that it would no longer release casualty details from its operations with journalist and news agency's having to refer to the Somali Government for casualty details. They would later undo the decision.

- January 30

Airstrike on an al-Shabaab encampment in the vicinity of Shebeeley in the Hiran Region killed 24 militants.

- February 1

Airstrike in the village of Gandarshe in the Lower Shebelle Region killed 13 al-Shabaab militants.

- February 6

Airstrike in the vicinity of Gandarshe in the Lower Shabelle Region killed 11 al-Shabaab militants.

- February 7

Airstrike in the vicinity of Bariire (Afgooye District) killed four al-Shabaab militants.

- February 8

Airstrike in Kobon near Kismayo killed eight al-Shabaab militants.

- February 11

Two airstrikes in Janaale, Lower Shabelle Region killed 12 al-Shabaab militants. The first strike killed eight while the second killed four. The strikes were executed as Somali forces were conducting an operation in the region an AFRICOM press release stated. Al-Shabaab claimed that the strikes hit civilian homes but did not give a casualty number.

- February 23

US forces conducted four airstrikes, two were conducted in Qunyo Barrow (Jilib District) and two were conducted in Awdheegle and near Janalle. The strikes targeted al-Shabaab facilities and checkpoints and killed two militants according to an AFRICOM press release. Al-Shabaab claimed that one of the strikes killed a 20-day-old baby and his father.

- February 24

Airstrike targeted al-Shabaab militants 23 miles East of Beledweyne in the Hiran Region. The strike killed 35 militants who were "transitioning between locations" according to an AFRICOM press release.

- February 25

Airstrike near Shebeeley in the Hiran Region killed 20 al-Shabaab militants.

- February 28

Airstrike in the Hiran Region killed 26 al-Shabaab militants bringing the number of airstrikes in Somalia conducted by US forces during 2019 to 24.

- March 11

Somali soldiers and US advisors were fired upon in Darasalam, Qoriyoley District, a self-defense strike in response would kill eight al-Shabaab militants. No US or Somali soldiers were harmed.

- March 12

Airstrike in Huley, Burhakaba District, killed two al-Shabaab militants.

- March 13

Self-Defence strike in support of Somali National Security Forces in Malayle, Lower Juba Region, killed three al-Shabaab militants according to an AFRICOM press release.

- April 14

Airstrike managed to kill Abdulhakim Dhuqub, a high ranking ISIS-Somalia official, near Xiriiro, Iskushuban District.

- July 27

A militant that AFRICOM believed to play a valuable role in the Islamic State in Somalia group was killed during an airstrike in the Golis Mountains of Puntland.

- August 20

Airstrike in the vicinity of Qunyo Barrow, Jilib District, killing one terrorist.

- October 1

Airstrike killed nine suspected militants and injured another, after al-Shabaab attacked Somali government forces about 40 kilometers northeast of Kismayo in Lower Juba Province.

- October 6

Airstrike near Qunyo Barrow, Jilib District, killing one terrorist.

- October 25

Airstrike targeted Islamic militants near Ameyra, south of Bosaso, which killed three of their leaders.

- November 19

Airstrike near Qunyo Barrow, Jilib District killing one terrorist.

- December 16

Airstrike in Dujuuma, Bu'ale District, killing one terrorist.

- December 30

Airstrikes, in the villages of Qunyo Barrow (Jilib District) and Aliyow Barrow (Balcad district), killed four al-Shabaab militants and destroyed two vehicles, following the Mogadishu bombing.

=== 2020 ===
As of April 2020, US forces have conducted 32 airstrikes in Somalia.

- January
- February

A U.S. airstrike killed Bashir Mohamed Mahamoud, also known by the alias Bashir Qorgab, who was a military commander of al-Shabaab on 22 February in Saakow, Middle Juba region. The Rewards for Justice used to offer a $5 million reward for information that brings him to justice since 2008.

Another airstrike killed an employee of the telecoms Hormuud Telecom. It was aimed at al-Shabaab in Jilib, Middle Juba.

- March

A press release from the U.S. Africa Command indicates that an airstrike was carried out near Janaale that killed five terrorists without any civilian casualties. However, a news outlet spoke with residents of Janaale who indicated that a 13-year-old boy and an elderly disabled man were killed on the attack, wherein a missile struck a mini-bus. A member of the Somali Parliament, Mahad Dore, confirmed the attack and that civilians were killed. After Amnesty International accused the US military of providing no accountability for civilian victims of airstrikes, Africom's commander announced on March 31 that quarterly reports detailing civilian death allegations would be included in the future, along with investigation progress of those claims. An Airwars spokesperson responded by saying that militaries conduct post-strike investigations from the air with few ground assessments.

- April

A U.S. airstrike killed three extremists including a senior leader, Yusuf Jiis, near Bush Madina in the Bay region on 2 April. Another airstrike killed five al-Shabab members near Jilib on 6 April.

- August

Somalian authorities mentioned that a U.S. drone strike killed a high-ranking member of al-Shabab, Abdel Kader Othman, near the southwestern town of Kurtunwarey (Kurtunwarey District).

- September

A U.S. military advisor was injured and three Somali special forces personal were killed during an al-Shabab vehicle-borne and mortar attack on a U.S. and Somali partner force in the vicinity of Jana Cabdalle (Afmadow District) on September 7.

- December

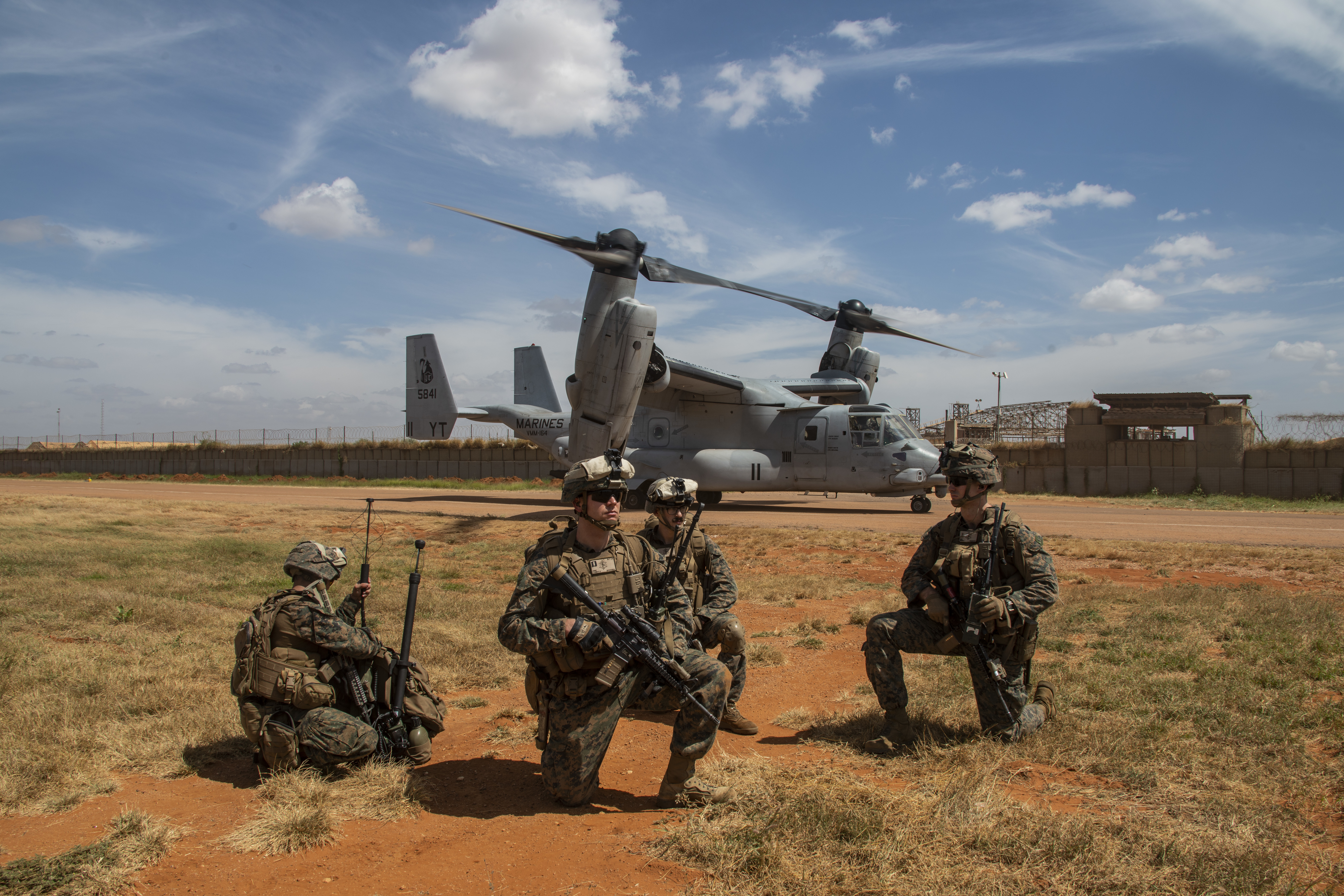
U.S. Marines with the 15th Marine Expeditionary Unit at Baledogle Airfield during Operation Octave Quartz, the operation to disperse U.S. forces across East Africa by the Trump administration, 22 December 2020

President Donald Trump ordered the Department of Defense to remove the majority of the 700 U.S. military troops in Somalia from the country in December 2020.

=== 2021 ===
- January 17

U.S. Africa Command affirms that the United States has completed its troop withdrawal from Somalia.

- January 19

Airstrikes in Jamaame and Deb Scinnele (Wanlaweyn District) killed three al-Shabaab militants.

- July 20

The U.S. carried out its first airstrike in Somalia under the Biden administration against al-Shabaab militants near Galkayo.

- July 23

The U.S. military conducted an airstrike against al-Shabaab militants near Galmudug.

- August 1

The U.S. military conducted an airstrike in the vicinity of Qeycad (Harardhere District) targeted al-Shabaab militants who were engaging members of the Danab.

- August 24

U.S. Africa Command conducted an airstrike against al-Shabaab fighters engaged in active combat with Somali forces.

=== 2022 ===
- February 23 and 24

U.S. Africa Command conducted an airstrike against al-Shabaab terrorists after they attacked Somali forces in a remote location near Duduble (Wanlaweyn District) on February 22.

- May 17

President Biden approved Pentagon's request to redeploy US Troops in Somalia. The official said that "under 500" troops will be sent back to the country.

- July 17

U.S. Africa Command conducted an airstrike against al-Shabaab terrorists, killing two, after they "attacked partner forces in a remote location near Libikus, Somalia".

- August 9

U.S. Africa Command conducted an airstrike against al-Shabaab terrorists who "attacked Somali National Army Forces near Beledweyne, Somalia".

- August 14

U.S. Africa Command conducted an airstrike against al-Shabaab terrorists near Teedaan, Somalia to support Somali troops carrying out military operations against al-Shabaab in Hiran region, killing 13 al-Shabaab fighters. It was soon afterwards reported that the Somali National Army successfully captured al-Shabaab's biggest base, which was located in the region.

- September 18

Airstrike near Buulobarde kills 27 al-Shabaab terrorists attacking Somali National Army forces. The defensive strikes allowed the Somali National Army and African Union Transition Mission in Somalia forces to regain the initiative and continue the operation to disrupt al-Shabaab in the Hiraan region of central Somalia. This operation against al-Shabaab is reported to be the largest combined Somali and ATMIS offensive operation in five years.

- October 1

U.S. drone strike near the coastal town of Haramka, located near Jilib. Strike kills senior al-Shabaab leader Abdullah Yare. Prior to his death, Yare had a $3 million bounty. At the time of his death, he was also in line to succeed ailing al-Shabaab leader Ahmed Diriye.

- October 26

U.S. airstrike kills two al-Shabaab jihadis in Buloburde, Hiran, according to the United States Africa Command; they were attacking Somali soldiers.

=== 2023 ===
- January 25

A key operative and facilitator for the Islamic State in Somalia Bilal al-Sudani and ten other insurgents killed by SEAL Team Six. No U.S. military casualties were reported in the operation, which was ordered by U.S. President Joe Biden.

- February 12

According to the US Africa Command, 12 al-Shabaab members were killed 472 kilometers northeast of Mogadishu. No civilian deaths or wounds were reported in the conflict. Last year the Pentagon asked Biden to depart US troops to Somalia for fighting against the al-Shabaab terrorist group. With Biden's approval, US troops appeared in the region.

=== 2024 ===
- January 11

Two US Navy sailors were reported missing while conducting operations off the coast of Somalia.

- January 21

A military airstrike killed 3 al-Shabab militants in a remote area of Somalia, approximately 35 km northeast of Kismayo.

- January 24

A military airstrike killed 6 al Shabaab terrorists in a remote area in the vicinity of Caad.

- January 25

A military airstrike killed at least 20 al-Shabab militants in central Somalia.

- February 9

A military airstrike killed 2 al-Shabab militants in a remote area in the vicinity of Yaq Dabel.

- February 15

One al-Shabaab militant was injured in the airstrike operation near Jilib.

- March 10

A military airstrike killed 3 al-Shabab militants in a remote area in the vicinity of Ugunji approximately 71 km southwest of Mogadishu.

- May 31

A military airstrike killed 3 ISIS militants in a remote area in the vicinity of Dhaardaar, approximately 81 km southeast of Bosaso.

- July 15

A military airstrike killed 10 al-Shabaab militants in a remote area in the vicinity of El Dhere approximately 170 km northeast of Mogadishu.

- December 24

A military airstrike killed 2 al-Shabaab militants approximately 10 km southwest of Kunyo Barrow. Al-Shabaab confirmed the death of Mohamed Mire Jama, a senior leader of the group previously designated as a terrorist by the United States.

- December 31

A military airstrike killed 10 al-Shabaab militants in Beer Xaani, approximately 35 km northwest of Kismayo.

=== 2025 ===
Approximate map of the current phase of the Somali Civil War (Updated June 2025) Somalia: Under control of the Federal Government of Somalia, the African Union Support and Stabilization Mission in Somalia, and the United States Under control of the Government of Puntland Under control of the Jubaland Dervish Force and the Raskamboni Movement Jihadist insurgent groups: Under presence/control of al-Qaeda-backed al-Shabaab and allies Under control of Islamic State-backed Somalia Wilayah Somaliland: Under control of the self-declared state of Somaliland (For a more detailed map of the current military situation, see here.)

==== U.S. Army continues operations in Puntland against ISIS ====
On 1 February 2025, U.S. President Donald Trump announced that the U.S. military carried out airstrikes against Islamic State positions in the caves of the north-east of Somalia. Puntland military spokersperson claimed that U.S. airstrikes against ISIS have killed forty-six fighters of in the Cal Miskaad mountains, a remote area in northeastern region Bari. According to government sources key ISIL figures were killed in those air strikes. It was later confirmed that the attack managed to kill an ISIS leader called Ahmed Maeleminine, a key recruiter and financier for the militant group.

On 7 March 2025, The United States Army stationed in Puntland maintains its operations and will not pull out of the region in response to double ongoing operations in the fight against ISIS in Puntland's Bari Region.

On 14-15 May 2025, U.S. AFRICOM conducted airstrikes targeting Al-Shabaab 55 kilometres (34 mi) northeast of Kismayo. The Guardian later reported that these airstrikes killed at least 12 civilians in Jamame, including eight children. A resident reported that a school and at least 18 homes were destroyed. The newspaper reported that this was the largest number of innocent people killed by the U.S. intervention in Somalia in a single incident in Somalia for 18 years, but no investigation appeared to have taken place.

On the weekend of 24-25 May 2025, U.S. linked forces, U.S. AFRICOM conducted a strike nearly 40 miles (64 km) northwest of Kismayo. The strikes were in deterrence to al-Shabaab forces who have "proven both its will and capability to attack U.S. forces" per a statement provided by AFRICOM.

==== Killing of Abdullahi Omar Abdi ====
On 12 September 2025, a United States airstrike, executed by U.S. Africa Command (AFRICOM) in Badhan district of Sanaag region of Puntland, resulted in the killing of Abdullahi Omar Abdi, a clan elder alleged to have been involved with Al-Shabaab as a weapons trafficker. The Pentagon stated that the operation was conducted in coordination with the Somali federal government. Following the airstrike, Puntland authorities commenced an investigation into the incident, which Abdi’s family claims was a deliberate attack targeting him. The airstrike has been causing a demonstration protest involving the implications of targeting local leaders in the ongoing conflict with Al-Shabaab in Somalia.

==== Swedish involvement ====
In October 2025, it was revealed by Swedish media that the country's armed forces were assisting the US in Somalia, primarily in regards to identification of killed and captured terrorists as part of Operation Active Viper.

==== Discussion of US recognition of Somaliland ====
In June 2025, Congressman Scott Perry of Pennsylvania introduced legislation to formally recognize the Republic of Somaliland. In August 2025, Senator Ted Cruz of Texas, who chairs the Senate Foreign Relations Subcommittee on Africa, called for the United States to formally recognize the Republic of Somaliland.

After Israel formally recognised Somaliland as an independent state on 26 December 2025, when asked about his position on recognizing Somaliland, Trump said "Just say, No, comma, not at this, Just say, No." Later stating "Does anyone know what Somaliland is, really?" adding "We'll study it. I study a lot of things and always make great decisions and they turn out to be correct." The US State Department also later said that it continues to recognize Somalia's territorial integrity, which includes the territory of Somaliland.

=== 2026 ===
On 21 January 2026, AFRICOM in coordination with the Federal Government of Somalia conducted an airstrike targeting the Golis Mountains occupied by ISIS-Somalia.

== Casualties ==
By August 2022, Airwars estimated that 78-153 civilians were killed by US airstrikes in Somalia since 2007, including 20-23 children, 12-13 women, and 79 named victims. The US has acknowledged only 5 civilian deaths in Somalia. American strikes also injured 34-49 civilians.

Per the Bureau of Investigative Journalism, by October 2020, between 1185 and 1313 Al-Shabaab militants were killed in American airstrikes.

In June 2025, New America, a Washington, D.C.-based think tank, reports that U.S. airstrikes between January to June in Somalia targeting Al-Shabaab and Islamic State militants resulted in up to 174 fatalities, including an estimated six to 30 civilian casualties.

== See also ==
- War in Somalia
- Operation Ocean Shield
- Operation Enduring Freedom – Horn of Africa
- Drone strikes in Pakistan, Afghanistan, Yemen and Libya
- Timeline of United States military operations
