= Bilal al-Berjawi =

British-Lebanese terrorist (d. 2012)

- Born: September 1984; Beirut, Lebanon
- Died: 21 January 2012 (aged 27); Elasha Biyaha, Lower Shabelle, Somalia
- Military career
- Allegiance: Harakat al-Shabaab al-Mujahideen (2006–2012)
- Nickname: Abu Hafsa al-Britani
- Conflicts: Somali civil war: Somalia War (2006–2009); Somali Civil War (2009–present) †

Bilal al-Berjawi al-Lubnani (Arabic: بلال البرجاوي اللبناني, Bilāl al-Birjawi al-Lubnanii; September 1984 – 21 January 2012) also known as Abu Hafsa al-Britani (Arabic: أبو حفصة البريطاني, Abu Hafsāt al-Biritaniu) was a British-Lebanese who was a member in the Somali Islamist militant group al-Shabaab and was killed by a U.S. drone strike.

== Early life ==
He was born in Beirut in September 1984. His parents took him to London where he grew up in St. John's Wood.

== Al-Shabaab ==
In 2006, he attended an al-Shabaab training camp in Mogadishu called “Bayt al-Jinn” where according to a jihadist obituary, he received explosives training from two senior al-Qaeda militants in Somalia, Fazul Abdullah Mohammed and Saleh Nabhan. He then returned to the UK to raise funds for the militant group sometime in 2007. During a trip to Lebanon in 2008, he was stopped by Lebanese counterterrorism authorities at Beirut–Rafic Hariri International Airport, in which he was released soon after. By 2009, he had been working with his stepfather as an air conditioner and plumbing engineer and had married. However, in February 2009 he traveled with his Egyptian friend Mohammed Sakr to Kenya; both were detained and questioned in Mombasa. Berjawi and Sakr made their way to Nairobi. When they arrived, they stayed at the family residence of Naji Mansour, an American citizen who lives in Nyari, a wealthy area of Nairobi close to the United Nations offices in Africa. A few weeks later, Kenyan anti-terror police raided the residence and arrested Sakr and Berjawi. After being interrogated and held without charge, they were released after four days and flown back to London, accompanied by four Kenyan intelligence officers. He was interrogated by MI5 when he arrived back in London for ten hours. As early as October that same year they returned to East Africa, Somalia this time; in November, Ugandan authorities searched for them. According to his "martyr biography," al-Berjawi attended another training camp in Baidoa. His UK citizenship was revoked in 2010 by Theresa May using the British Nationality Act, which may have cleared the path for their assassination by eliminating its legal responsibility to protect their rights as citizens. on June 23, 2011, he was severely injured in a drone strike near Kismayo orchestrated by a Joint Special Operations Command unit known as TF 48–4, who had been tracking him since 2006 and had referred to him in a case study as "Operation Peckham".

== Death ==
According to a secret case study first published in October 2015 by The Intercept, on January 21, 2012, Berjawi's white SUV was seen at 3:59 a.m by an MQ-9 Reaper drone on a road northwest of Mogadishu, at 10:39am, the driver of the car had been positively identified al-Berjawi and at 11:03am, he was killed by a drone strike. The following day, Ali Mohamed Rage, al-Shabaab's official spokesperson, confirmed his death. His family believes that he was tracked by a cell phone he used to call his wife, who had given birth to his third child. She had visited him in Somalia for a few months in early 2011. The covert unit tasked with killing him had already tracked his phone for nine days, with the call being the confirmation.

Al-Shabaab publicly executed three alleged spies in July 2012 for assisting in the assassination of Berjawi, as well as Mohammed Sakr, who was later killed in February by a drone strike. In a confession video of one of the accused informants included in a propaganda film released by the militant group's media wing, Al-Kataib, a CIA agent in Mogadishu gave to him an envelope containing four thousand dollars and a Nokia X2 phone. The informant claimed that on the day that Berjawi was targeted, he placed the phone in Berjawi's car and made sure it was turned on, to which he was killed a few minutes later.
