= December 2019 Mogadishu bombing =

Terrorist attack in Somalia

- Part of the Somali Civil War (2009–present)
- Ex-Control Afgoye (Somalia)
- Location: 02°02′42″N 45°16′58″E; Mogadishu, Somalia
- Date: 28 December 2019
- Attack type: Suicide bombing
- Weapon: Truck bomb
- Deaths: 85 (+12 missing)
- Injuries: 140+
- Perpetrator: Al-Shabaab

On 28 December 2019, a suicide truck bomber killed at least 85 people at the Ex-Control Afgoye police checkpoint in Mogadishu, Somalia. More than 140 others were wounded and, as of 31 December, 12 people remained missing. Al-Shabaab claimed responsibility for the attack on 30 December. The attack was the deadliest in Somalia since the 14 October 2017 Mogadishu bombings, which killed 587 people.

== Attack ==
The attack occurred at a busy intersection on the western outskirts of Mogadishu, at a police checkpoint during local rush hour. The major intersection connects Mogadishu with the rest of southern and southwestern Somalia. The Ex-Control Afgoye checkpoint is located near a tax office, and is used by vehicles entering Mogadishu from nearby Afgooye town.

The truck bomb explosion caused massive damage to the surrounding area, and left many of the dead burned beyond recognition. At least 15 of those killed were university students returning to class at Benadir University, whose minibus was demolished in the explosion. Two Turkish engineers, who were constructing a road from the checkpoint into the city, were also killed in the bombing. Many others were wounded. Fifteen critically injured people, including an eight-month-old baby, were airlifted to Istanbul, Turkey for further medical treatment; thirty other critically injured people received medical treatment in Qatar and other neighboring countries.

Somali Prime Minister Hassan Ali Khaire announced the establishment of a national response committee to help the injured and offer support to those who lost family members in the attack.

== Responsibility and aftermath ==
Initially, no group claimed responsibility for the attack. On 30 December, two days after the attack, radical Islamist group Al-Shabaab, which had carried out previous suicide attacks in Mogadishu, claimed responsibility. Through spokesman Ali Mohamud Rageh (also known as Ali Dhere), the group stated that they targeted a convoy of Turkish and Somali forces in the attack, noting that they "inflicted heavy losses on the Turks and the apostate militias who were protecting them."

Somalia's National Intelligence and Security Agency (NISA) stated that a foreign country helped organize the attack, issuing a statement that, "We have submitted to the national leaders a preliminary report indicating that the massacre against the Somali people in Mogadishu on 28 December 2019 was planned by a foreign country. To complete the ongoing investigation we will seek cooperation from some of the international intelligence agencies." However, the statement did not name the country suspected to be involved or provide additional evidence.

The Somali government, in coordination with U.S. Africa Command, conducted three retaliatory airstrikes targeting Al-Shabaab leaders in the Lower Shabelle region after the attack. The airstrikes, in the villages of Kunyo Barrow and Aliyow Barrow, killed four militants and destroyed two vehicles.
