= 2009 Baraawe raid =

SEAL Team Six helicopter assault in Somalia

- Part of Operation Enduring Freedom – Horn of Africa
| Date | 14 September 2009 |
| Location | Baraawe, Somalia 1°06′48″N 44°01′49″E |
| Result | Saleh Ali Saleh Nabhan killed |

Belligerents
| United States | al-Qaeda al-Shabaab |

Units involved
| US Naval Special Warfare Development Group | al-Qaeda; Al-Shabaab militant group |

Casualties and losses
| None | 6 killed |

The Baraawe raid, code-named Operation Celestial Balance, was a helicopter assault conducted by SEAL Team Six against the al-Qaeda-linked terrorist Saleh Ali Saleh Nabhan and associated al-Shabaab militants near the town of Baraawe in southern Somalia.

== Background ==
Nabhan served as a key facilitator between al-Qaeda and al-Shabaab. He had been wanted by the United States since 2006 for his role as a member of the east-African al-Qaeda cell responsible for several terrorist attacks in East Africa, including the 1998 United States embassy bombings and the 2002 Mombasa attacks. In 2007, in the midst of the Battle of Ras Kamboni, Nabhan was unsuccessfully targeted by an American military airstrike in the town of Ras Kamboni.

A long-Running CIA CTC/SAD operation hunted Nabhan for a number of years, recruiting a network of Somali agents and paying off Somali warlords for information on the location of Nabhan and his associates. A team from the ISA began getting a precise location of the target from cell phone intercepts and surveillance from both short-range US Navy Scan Eagle UAVs and long range CIA Predators.

CIA and JSOC planners presented President Obama with 4 options: a Tomahawk cruise missile strike, an airstrike, an attack by Little Bird helicopters or an attempt to capture the target with an assault force of SEALs. Obama picked the airstrike option, as it limited the any potential collateral damage and the chances of US casualties.

== Raid ==
On the day of the operation, Nabhan was seen traveling in a two-car convoy from the southern coastal town of Barawe. This was reportedly the best opportunity to target him, as he would be away from civilian population, particularly as the convoy had stopped for breakfast. As a USMC AV-8B approached its release point, it reported a malfunction in its targeting system; so, 4 helicopters (2 AH-6M Little Birds and 2 MH-6M Little Birds) piloted by members of the 160th SOAR, carrying a team of SEALs from DEVGRU launched from a Navy Ship off-shore. The AH-6s strafed the two-vehicle convoy, killing Nabhan and 3 other al-Shabaab terrorists. The MH-6s dropped off the DEVGRU operators who cleared the vehicles and recovered Nabhan's body. The DEVGRU operatives placed the bodies of the four terrorists in body bags and loaded them onto their helicopters. The DEVGRU operatives extracted onto the helicopters and returned to their naval vessels. CBS News reported that two other wounded militants were also captured.

== See also ==
- List of operations conducted by SEAL Team Six
- Drone strikes in Somalia
- Targeted killing
- Dobley airstrike
