= November 2017 Somalia airstrike =

- Part of American military intervention in Somalia (2007-present)
- Type: Airstrike
- Location: 125 miles northwest of Mogadishu, Bay Region, Somalia
- Target: Al-Shabaab training camp
- Date: November 21, 2017; 10:30 a.m. EAT
- Executed by: United States
- Casualties: 100+ militants killed (per US and Somalia)

On November 21, 2017 at 10:30 a.m. East Africa Time the United States Military conducted an airstrike on an Al-Shabaab training camp 125 miles Northwest of the Somali capital Mogadishu in the Bay Region by a crewed aircraft.

== History ==
More than 100 militants were estimated to have been killed making it the deadliest single airstrike in Somalia since March 2016 when an airstrike on an Al-Shabaab camp killed over 150 militants. Somalia state news agency SONNA stated that "about 100 militants were killed" after US planes and Somali commandos attacked. Abdiasis Abu Musab a spokesman for Al-Shabaab denied the attack claiming it to be propaganda. The strike was conducted at the request of the Somali Government with Somalia's information minister Abdirahman Omar Osman stating "Those militants were preparing explosives and attacks. Operations against al-Shabaab have been stepped up. We asked the US to help us from the air to make our readied ground offensive more successful".

The airstrike was the 29th conducted by the US in Somalia during 2017 and was one of nine during November acknowledged by United States Africa Command and was part of an uptick of US airstrikes targeting Al-Shabaab and ISIL militants in the country. At the time of the strike the US estimated that between 3,000 and 6,000 Al-Shabaab and less than 250 ISIL fighters operated in Somalia. The airstrike was made possible after president Donald Trump gave Africa Command authority to conduct precision airstrikes on Al-Shaabab and ISIL targets in support of the Federal Government of Somalia and the African Union in March 2017. Previously the command could only conduct airstrikes in self defense for advisors working with Somali troops on the ground with operations such as the March 2016 strikes being outliers.
