= 2025 United States Embassy in Haiti shooting =

Attack on embassy by armed assailants

- Part of the Haitian conflict and the Haitian crisis (2018–present)
Date	November 13, 2025
Location	Tabarre, Port-au-Prince, Haiti
Result	United States victory; Gangsters successfully repelled

Belligerents
United States	Haitian gangsters

Commanders and leaders
Henry T. Wooster; Colonel Tom "Banshee" Trimble	

Units involved
22nd Marine Expeditionary Unit; Marine Corps Security Force Regiment; Marine Security Guard	Unknown

Casualties and losses
None	Unknown

On November 13, 2025, an armed confrontation occurred at the United States Embassy to Haiti complex in Tabarre, a northern suburb of the Haitian capital of Port-au-Prince. The incident involved an exchange of gunfire between U.S. Marines and a group of armed assailants strongly suspected by the State Department to be local gang members affiliated with the powerful and volatile Viv Ansanm coalition. There were no casualties reported.

The event occurred during the ongoing Haitian conflict and the wider Haitian crisis (2018–present), a period characterized by extreme political instability, a humanitarian emergency, and the near-total collapse of state authority, with criminal gangs controlling an estimated 80-90% of the capital.

== Background ==
=== Haitian crisis ===
The existing political, economic, and social crisis in Haiti began with protests across Haitian cities on July 7, 2018, in response to rising fuel prices. These protests gradually evolved into demands for the resignation of the president, Jovenel Moïse. Led by opposition politician Jean-Charles Moïse (no relation), protesters demanded a transitional government, provision of social programs, and the prosecution of corrupt officials. From 2019 to 2021, massive protests called for the Jovenel Moïse government to resign. Moïse had come to power in the 2016 presidential election with voter turnout of only 21%. Previously, the 2015 elections had been annulled due to fraud. On February 7, 2021, supporters of the opposition allegedly attempted a coup d'état, leading to 23 arrests, as well as clashes between protestors and police.

On July 6, 2021, Jovenel Moïse was assassinated, allegedly by a group of 28 foreign mercenaries. Three of the suspected assassins were killed, and 20 were arrested while police searched for the other gunmen and organizers of the attack. On July 20, 2021, Ariel Henry assumed the office of acting prime minister.

In September 2022, further protests erupted in response to rising energy prices, and a federation of gangs created a blockade around Haiti's largest fuel depot. Combined with a cholera outbreak and widespread acute hunger, the crisis led the United Nations Security Council to impose sanctions on Jimmy Chérizier, one of the country's gang leaders. In 2022, Canada issued sanctions against three wealthy businessmen—Gilbert Bigio, Reynold Deeb, and Sherif Abdallah—whom they accused of "participat[ing] in gross and systematic human rights violations in Haiti"—along with numerous politicians including Michel Martelly, Laurent Lamothe, Jean-Henry Céant, Joseph Lambert, and Youri Latortue. A UN report to the Security Council in October 2023 likewise identified Martelly, Deeb, and Latortue as having ties to gangs.

=== Armed conflict ===
Since 2020, the capital city of Port-au-Prince has been the site of an ongoing armed conflict. The government of Haiti and Haitian security forces have struggled to maintain their control of Port-au-Prince amid this conflict, with anti-government forces speculated to control up to 90% of the city by 2023. In response to the escalating fighting, an armed vigilante movement, known as bwa kale, also emerged, with the purpose of fighting the gangs. On 2 October 2023, United Nations Security Council Resolution 2699 was approved, authorizing a Kenya-led "multinational security support mission" to Haiti. Until 2024, the conflict was between two major groups and their allies: the Revolutionary Forces of the G9 Family and Allies (FRG9 or G9) and the G-Pèp. However, in February 2024, the two rival groups formed a coalition opposing the government and the UN mission.

In March 2024, violence spread throughout Port-au-Prince with the goal of obtaining the resignation of acting prime minister Ariel Henry, leading to the storming of two prisons and the release of thousands of prisoners. Henry was prevented from returning to Haiti after a trip intended to secure a peacekeeping force of Kenyan police to fight gang violence. The power vacuum and chaos in the streets led to the scheduling of an emergency CARICOM meeting on March 11. These attacks and subsequent attacks on various government institutions led the Haitian government to declare a state of emergency and impose a curfew. The same day, Henry announced his resignation under pressure from protesters, gangs, and the international community, effective upon the naming of a new Prime Minister and cabinet by a transitional council. Henry was replaced by Garry Conille on June 3, 2024.

=== American involvement ===
Since the beginning of the crisis, and gradually increasing as events unfolded, the US supported international efforts to help stabilize Haiti, including broad political and financial support for the Haitian police and the Gang Suppression Force. In addition to providing support for the people of Haiti, the US has been under pressure to protect its own citizenry amid the gang war, as several Americans have been killed or kidnapped for ransom.

On March 9, 2024, amid the violence spreading throughout Port-au-Prince, the United States decided to evacuate all non-essential personnel from its embassy in the capital, although it kept the embassy open for the sake of Americans still in the embattled nation. As the staff evacuated, the Marine Corps deployed a Fleet Anti-terrorism Security Team (FAST) of the Marine Corps Security Force Regiment to bolster the existing complement of Marine Embassy Guards while the embassy continued to conduct essential services.

In October 2024, violence escalated to the point where a United Nations World Food Programme helicopter carrying 18 passengers and crew was fired upon. A few days later, two US Embassy vehicles were peppered with gunfire by unidentified gang members, with one of the vehicles' windshields shattering. These attacks led the US embassy to evacuate even more Embassy staff and deploy more Marines. It was unclear why in particular these attacks occurred, but it was noted that Chérizier had been making strange comments about the US embassy. On the other hand, another gang leader and ally of Chérizier, Vitel’homme Innocent's Kraze Baryè had been battling with the Haitian police and the Kenya-led security mission at the time. In any case, it remains unclear who specifically perpetrated the attack.

On January 20 of the following year, another US armored vehicle was ambushed by Haitian gangsters with armor-piercing rounds while traveling between the embassy and the US Stecher-Roumain housing compound. The attackers were waiting for the van to pass in front of them in an alleyway, and then discharged their firearms when the van arrived. One of the passengers, a gardener for the compound, was shot, but was taken to a hospital where he was treated for his injury. The following day, a convoy of three consular corps vehicles were attacked by gangsters near Toussaint Louverture International Airport. Five of the people in the transports were injured, one was killed, and the only unarmored vehicle was set on fire and destroyed.

== Attack on the embassy ==
On November 15, 2025, Capt. Steven Keenan, a Marine Corps representative, stated that the "Marines supporting embassy security operations were fired upon" in the capital city of Port-au-Prince and then returned fire. He further mentioned that no marines were injured. It was later revealed that some of the Marines were equipped with mini drones, and that the 22nd Marine Expeditionary Unit participated in the action.

== Aftermath ==
It was later speculated that the attack may have been a reprisal for the US-backed Gang Suppression Force and Haitian police carrying out an attack on the gangs just before the embassy skirmish.

The following week, gang leaders called for the public to stay indoors and encouraged further violence against Haitian and Kenyan forces.

On January 31, 2026, the US Embassy reported that gunfire was heard in the vicinity of the embassy premises.

In June 2026, Colonel Tom “Banshee” Trimble, who heads the 22nd Marine Expeditionary Unit, reported that the Marines guarding the embassy actually came under fire and returned fire on several occasions in 2025, and that the November 13th case was just one of several. He reported that no Marine Corps personnel were killed or injured, but that he would not comment on who specifically attacked them. He added that it was unknown what the casualties were of the attackers, but that if he had that intel, he could not disclose it publicly. In his interview, he was questioned whether the Marines would be receiving Combat Action Ribbons and other honors for their work; he confirmed that military leaders were looking into the matter, but that the matter was as of yet uncertain.

== See also ==
- War of the South
- United States occupation of Haiti
- Operation Uphold Democracy
- 2004 Haitian coup d'état
- Attacks on the United States
- 2026 Croix-des-Bouquets kidnapping
- Salvadoran military intervention in Haiti
