= December 2018 airstrikes in Gandarshe =

Airstrikes against Al-Shabaab militant in Southern Somalia

- Part of American military intervention in Somalia (2007–present)
- Location: Gandarshe, Lower Shabelle, South West State of Somalia; 1.833333°N 44.966667°E
- Target: Al-Shabaab camp and vehicles
- Date: December 15–16, 2018
- Executed by: United States Africa Command in coordination with the Federal Government of Somalia
- Outcome: Attack on Somali military base prevented
- Casualties: December 15: 34 killed; December 16: 28 killed; Total: 62 Al-Shabaab militants killed (per US and Somalia)

On December 15 and 16, 2018, the United States Military in coordination with the Federal Government of Somalia conducted six airstrikes in the coastal town of Gandarshe on Al-Shabaab militants who were suspected to have been preparing an attack on a Somali military base in the Lower Shabelle region. Four of the airstrikes were conducted on December 15, killing 34, while two more were conducted on the 16th killing 28, bringing the total to 62 people killed – all said to have been militants with no civilians reportedly killed or injured according to United States Africa Command. The town of Gandarshe located 30 miles Southwest of the Somali capital Mogadishu had long been a launching point for attacks by Al-Shabaab including car bombings. The operation brings the number of airstrikes in Somalia to at least 46 by the United States during 2018.
