= Burhakaba District =

Burhakaba
- District
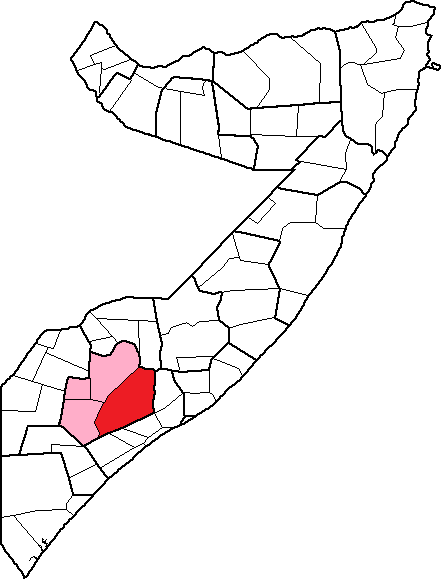
- Country: Somalia
- Region: Bay
- Capital: Burhakaba
- Time zone: UTC+3 (EAT)

Burhakaba District (Somali: Degmada Buurhakaba) is a district in the southern Bay region of Somalia. Its capital is Burhakaba.
