= Danab Brigade =

Highly-trained commando force of the Somali National Army

Somali Danab
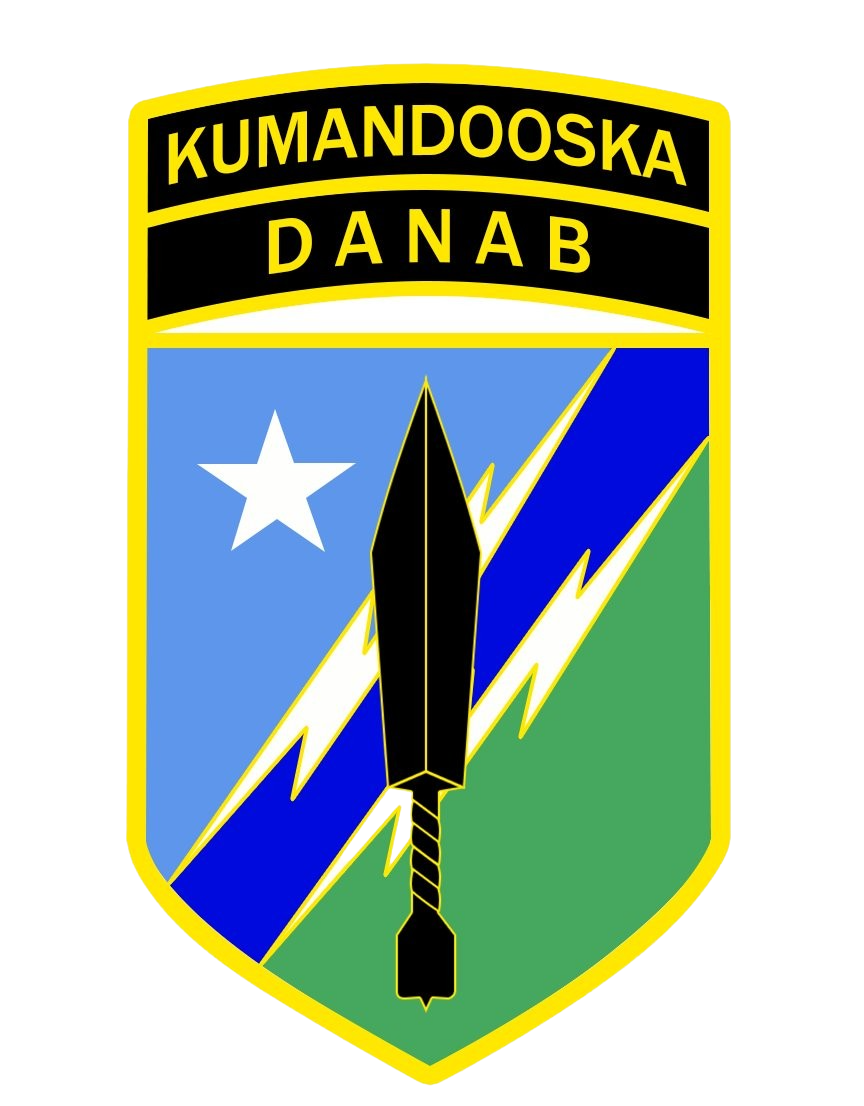
- Danab Brigade Coat of Arms
- Active: 11 March 2014
- Type: Special forces
- Part of: Somali National Army
- Garrison/HQ: Baledogle Airfield
- Nickname: "Kuumaandoska" (English: The Commandos)
- Motto: Isku Tiirsada!
- Colors: Black Gold Somali Blue Khaki (Beret colour)
- Anniversaries: 12 April (Armed Forces Day); 1 July (Somali Independence Day)
- Engagements: Somali Civil War

Commanders
- Current commander: Major Abdirahman "Beeryare"

The Danab Brigade (Somali: Ciidamada Danab, "Lightning Force"), also known as the Somali Danab, are a U.S. sponsored light infantry force of the Somali National Army. They are made up of members from multiple clans throughout Somalia.

Danab have been successful in recapturing territory previously held by the Al-Qaeda affiliate group and Al-Shabaab, They have carried out counterinsurgency in desert and urban terrain, executive protection, hostage rescue, provided security in areas at risk of Al-Shabaab attack or terrorism, and reconnaissance.

== History ==
In February 2014, U.S. contractors concluded a six-month training course for the first commandos since 1991. Training had been carried out by Bancroft Global Development, a U.S. private military contractor, paid for by the African Union Mission in Somalia (AMISOM) which is then reimbursed by the U.S. State Department. The aim was to create a mixed-clan unit. The Danab Special Forces units was established at Baledogle Airfield, in Walaweyn District, Lower Shabelle.

The training of the first Danab company ("Advanced Infantry Company") began in October 2013, with 150 recruits. As of July 2014, training of the second unit was underway. General Elmi said the training was geared toward both urban and rural environments, and is aimed at preparing the soldiers for guerrilla warfare and all other types of modern military special warfare operations. Elmi said that a total of 570 commandos were expected to have completed training by U.S. security personnel by the end of 2014.

In early May 2017, Naval Special Warfare Development Group (DEVGRU or "SEAL Team Six") targeted a local leader of al-Shabaab in Darusalam village, where Abdirahman Mohamed Warsame, known as Mahad Karate, was believed to be hiding in an area on the Shebelle River called Barii, about 40 miles (64 km) west of the capital Mogadishu. Danab Special Forces accompanied them. The raid resulted in the death of a DEVGRU senior petty officer, the first US combat death in Somalia since the "Day of the Rangers" in 1993.

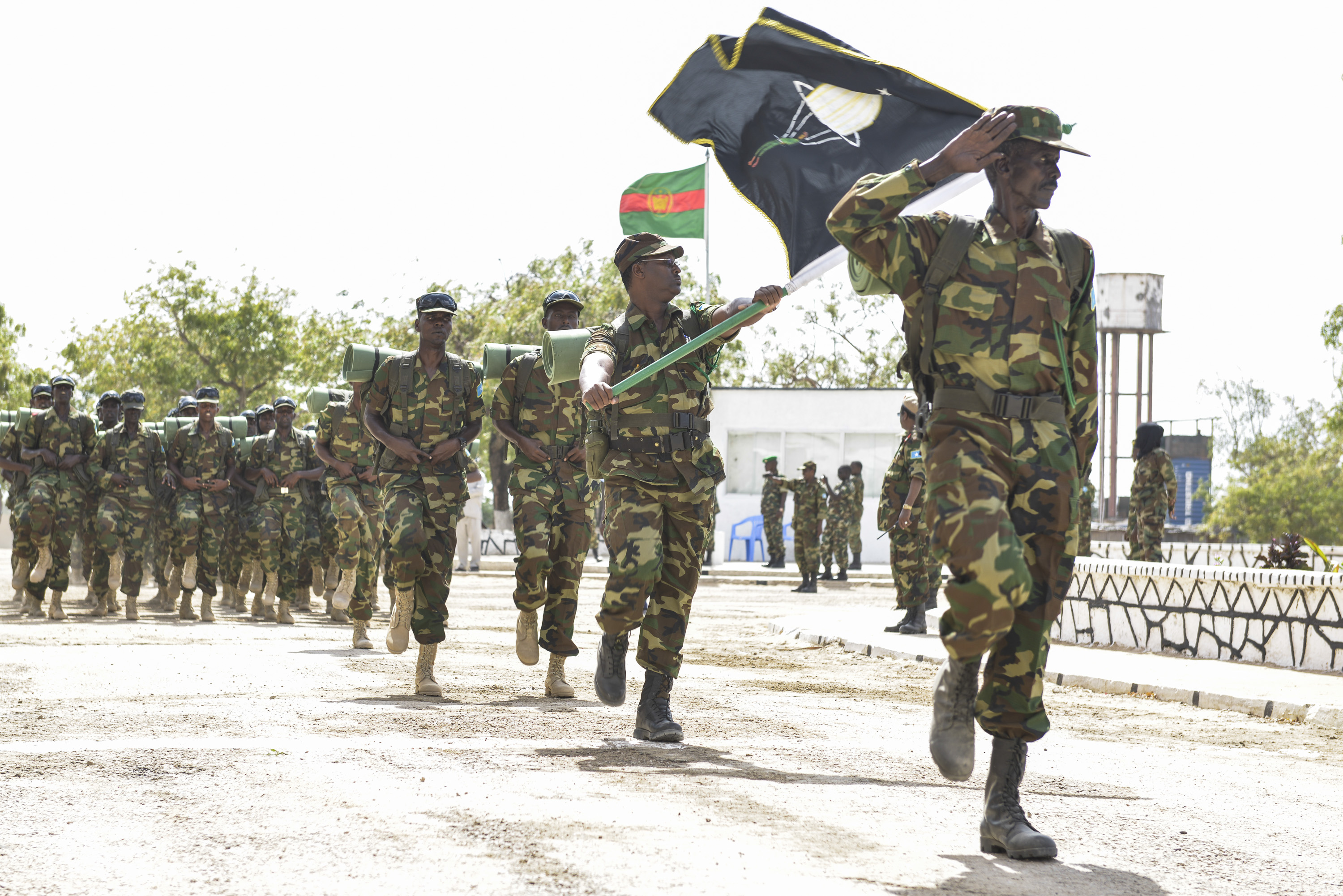
Danab Brigade on the SNA's 54th Anniversary in 2014

The initial Danab training was very successful; thus, the United States began to expand the capability initially into a battalion. Later a 3,000 - 3,500 man brigade was planned. Special Operations Command Africa and contractors trained new recruits and barracks were repaired and expanded at Baledogle Airfield.

Over the years 2018 and 2019, Danab has regularly carried out strikes that have killed al Shabaab personnel. U.S. joint terminal attack controllers (JTAC) have been used to direct air attacks on enemy forces when Danab has been in action.

Danab Special Forces took part in Exercise Justified Accord 2024.

Squad of Somali National Army Danab Commandos posing with M249 machine guns and Islamic headbands. Faces are redacted for operational security.

== Equipment ==
Danab Special Forces were initially outfitted in standard Somali National Army uniforms but later transitioned to wearing desert digital camouflage similar to that of U.S. special forces. They are distinguished by a patch of their emblem on their left shoulder, a paratrooper insignia on the left breast of their uniform, and may wear an airborne tab on their shoulder.

The brigade mainly use tiger stripe and desert digital camouflage opposed to the mainly woodland camouflage that the SNA use and the urban digital camouflage the NISA use as well, The brigade does use the sand beret but if a unit's function differ, they will use the beret colour to suit their function (i.e. for Presidential Security, they will use red berets or helmets with "B.D." inscribed on them).

Danab Special Forces utilise Kevlar vests, tactical helmets with night vision goggles, and other higher-end equipment in combat.

== Training ==
Prospective Danab Special Forces are trained by USSOCOM operators. In May 2021, it was reported that the British Army Ranger Regiment would be sent to Africa to train the Danab Special Forces on its first overseas deployment.

The unit accepts male and female candidates.
