= Kunyo Barrow =

Town in Lower Shebelle, Somalia

- Town
- Location in Somalia.
- Coordinates: 0°47′40″N 43°22′58″E
- Country: Somalia (de iure) Islamic Emirate of Somalia (de facto)
- Regional State: Jubaland
- Region: Middle Juba
- District: Jilib District

Government
  - Control: Al-Shabaab
- Time zone: UTC+3 (EAT)

Kunyo Barrow (also spelt Qunyo Barrow) (Maay: Kiunyo Baarow) is a town in the southern Middle Juba region of Somalia. It is situated around 257 km southwest of the capital Mogadishu.

== History ==
Beginning in February 2019, the United States launched airstrikes in Kunyo Barrow, killing a man and a 20-month-old child. As of October 2023, the town is under Al-Shabaab control.

On 24 December 2024, the United States launched an airstrike 10 km southwest of Kenya Barrow, killing two al-Shabaab militants, including the central figure Mohamed Mire.

== Demographics ==
Kunyo Barrow has a population of around 10,000 inhabitants. The town is predominantly inhabited by the Tunni clan sub-division of the Digil Rahanweyn Somalis.
