= 2017 raid on Barii =

Raid by US Navy SEALs and Somali Danab Commandos

Coordinates: 1.1357°S 41.2225°E

- Part of the War in Somalia, the war on terror and Operation Enduring Freedom – Horn of Africa
| Date | 5 May 2017 |
| Location | Barii, 40 miles west of Mogadishu, Somalia |
| Result | Al-Shabaab victory |

Belligerents
| United States; Somalia | Al-Shabaab |

Commanders and leaders
| (United States) David J. Furness (United States) Kyle Milliken † | Mahad Karate; Moalin Osman Abdi Badil † |

Strength
| (United States) : 50 DEVGRU operators (In all of Somalia) several helicopters : Danab ("Lightning") commandos | Unknown |

Casualties and losses
| (United States) : 1 killed 2 wounded (Somalia) : none | 4–8 killed |

The 2017 raid on Barii was a military operation conducted by SEAL Team Six (DEVGRU) Silver squadron with Danab commandos from the Federal Government of Somalia. The raid resulted in the death of DEVGRU Senior Chief Petty Officer Kyle Milliken, marking the first US serviceman combat death in Somalia since the First Battle of Mogadishu in 1993, also known as "Black Hawk Down".

== Events ==
A firefight erupted shortly after a DEVGRU team and Somali army forces were dropped by helicopter near an al-Shabaab compound in an area on the Shebelle River called Barii, about 40 miles (64 km) west of the capital Mogadishu. The DEVGRU operators were conducting an operation with Somali commandos to target a local leader of al-Shabaab in Darusalam village, where Abdirahman Mohamed Warsame, known as Mahad Karate, was believed to be hiding.

In addition to the dead DEVGRU operator, at least two other Americans were wounded, including a Somali-American interpreter. At least three al-Shabaab militants also died plus another local al-Shabaab commander. The mission was aborted soon after insurgents opened fire. The American/Somali group quickly returned to the aircraft that had taken it to the area and was evacuated.
