= Saleh Ali Saleh Nabhan =

Member of al-Qaeda

- صالح علي صالح نبهان
- Born: Saleh Ali Saleh Nabhan; 4 April 1979; Mombasa, Kenya
- Died: 14 September 2009 (aged 30); Baraawe, Somalia

Saleh Ali Saleh Nabhan (Arabic: صالح علي صالح نبهان) (4 April 1979, Mombasa, Kenya – 14 September 2009, near Baraawe, Somalia) also known as Abu Yusuf, was an operative of al-Qaeda in Somalia. He was listed on the FBI's third major "wanted" list, the FBI Seeking Information – War on Terrorism list, for his association with multiple attacks in Kenya in 2002, as well as his possible involvement in the 1998 United States embassy bombings, in which over 250 people lost their lives.

In September 2009, he was killed in a raid undertaken by United States Navy SEALs.

== Early life ==
He was born in the Majengo district of Mombasa, Kenya.

== Activity ==
He became wanted in 2006 by the United States Department of Justice's FBI, "for questioning in connection with the 2002 attacks in Mombasa, Kenya, against a hotel and an airliner." The Kenyan hotel bombing followed the airliner shoot down attempt, in near-simultaneous attacks against two Israeli-owned targets. Nabhan was also wanted in Kenya for those crimes, as well as for his alleged involvement in the 1998 United States embassy bombings. The main suspects in all three cases are affiliated with al Qaeda, which claimed responsibility. For his role in the plot Nabhan became listed on the FBI's third major "wanted" list, the FBI Seeking Information – War on Terrorism list.

On 28 November 2002, an unsuccessful attempt was made to shoot down an Arkia Israel Airlines Boeing 757-chartered tourist plane taking off from Moi International Airport in Mombasa using surface-to-air missiles. No one was hurt on the plane, which landed safely in Tel Aviv. About 20 minutes later, in Mombasa, Kenya, three suicide bombers detonated an SUV in the lobby of the Israeli-owned beachfront Paradise Hotel, killing three Israelis and ten Kenyans, and injuring 80. Nabhan was one of five suspects in the attack and allegedly bought the Mitsubishi Pajero used in the attack from a car dealership in Mombasa. He was also believed to have brought in the Strela 2 missiles that were fired at the airplane from neighbouring Somalia.

Nabhan appeared in a video produced by al-Shabaab in 2008. He made a formal outreach to senior al Qaeda leaders in a video that was titled “A Word to the Ummah: From the Mujahid leader, Saleh Nabhan”. He took an oath of allegiance to bin Laden and al Qaeda on behalf of Shabaab, and he encouraged foreign fighters to come and train at camps controlled by Shabaab and engage in combat with Ethiopian forces, African Union peacekeepers, and the Transitional Federal Government.

US and Israeli officials suspected a Somali group linked to al-Qaeda was responsible for the bombing and speculated that the suspects had smuggled the missiles into Kenya from Somalia.

On 24 February 2006, the FBI added Saleh Ali Saleh Nabhan among three names to the Seeking Information – War on Terrorism list. With these three additions, as of 24 February 2006 the total count on the outstanding Seeking Information list stood at ten.

Nabhan might have been protected in Somalia by the Islamic Courts Union prior to their ouster in late 2006. An American air gunship attack near Ras Kamboni on 7 January 2007 targeted al-Qaeda suspects, who might have included Nabhan.

On 9 March 2007 the International Herald Tribune reported that someone connected with the 2002 Mombasa bombing had been apprehended, and speculated that it was Saleh Ali Saleh Nabhan. However it turned out to be Abdulmalik Mohammed, who was transferred to Guantanamo about a month later.

On 2 March 2008, a U.S. Navy vessel fired two missiles in an attack on an Al Qaeda training camp in southern Somalia. The attack reportedly targeted Nabhan.

== Death ==
Saleh Ali Saleh Nabhan was killed following a raid by Joint Special Operations Command (JSOC) forces including U.S. Navy SEALs in four helicopters (including at least two AH-6s) on Monday 14 September 2009. Nabhan was driving south of the capital Mogadishu near Baraawe in a two vehicle convoy when attacked by assault helicopters. The raid, code-named Operation Celestial Balance, took place around 1:00 pm local time, with the helicopters arriving from a ship offshore, firing on the vehicles, and landing briefly to take bodies. President Barack Obama is reported to have signed an "Execute Order" for the operation ten days before the attack was launched. Members of Al-Shabaab were also killed. JSOC and the CIA had been trying to kill Nabhan for some time; an AC-130 Gunship was called in during a January 2007 attempt. An American intelligence source stated that CIA paramilitary teams from Special Activities Division were directly embedded with Ethiopian forces in Somalia, allowing for the tactical intelligence to launch these operations.

Nabhan's body was buried at sea, a practice later repeated with the disposal of Osama bin Laden's corpse.

On 14 February 2010, the MSNBC cable news channel reported that three alternatives were presented to President Barack Obama: (1) assassination via a missile attack from a drone, or other airplane; (2) assassination by fire from helicopters, which could then land for DNA samples, to confirm his identity; and (3) live capture. MSNBC suggested that this killing represents a trend, since remote targeting continues to be more reliable—while locations where captives can be detained without complications have dwindled.

== Legacy ==
Al-Shabaab named its external operations unit as the "Saleh Ali Saleh Nabhan Battalion." (Arabic: كتيبة صالح علي صالح نبهان). A branch of the militant organisation that specialises in attacking both civilian and military targets The same unit has carried out a number of high-profile attacks in the past, including the raid on a Kenyan-AMISOM base in El Adde on January 15, 2016, the DusitD2 Complex attack in Nairobi in January 2019, and the suicide bombings in Kampala, Uganda, in July 2010. With roots in the city of Mombasa, the unit grew from a small group to a small battalion under the early leadership and training of Fazul Muhammed.

== See also ==
- Targeted killing
- Extrajudicial execution
