= Mubaarak =

Town in Somalia

Mubaarak Mubarak مبارك
- Town
- Location within Somalia
- Coordinates: 1.9180035°N 44.7728712°E
- Country: Somalia
- State: South West State of Somalia
- Region: Lower Shabelle
- District: Qoriyoley District

Area
  - Total: 0.236 sq mi (0.611 km^{2})
  - Land: 0.2333 sq mi (0.6042 km^{2})
  - Water: 0.0025 sq mi (0.0064 km^{2}) 1.07%
- Elevation: 220 ft (67 m)
- Time zone: +3 (EAT)

Mubaarak (Somali: Mubarak, Arabic: مبارك, Romanized: Mubārak) is a town in the Qoryoley District of the Lower Shabelle region under the Governorate of Merca (Marka, Marca, Merka) City Mainland. The Shebelle River (Webi Shabeelie) flows through the east of Mubaarak. The Shabelle River originates from the Ethiopian Highlands and flows south.

== Geography ==
Mubaarak is located in the Qoriyoley District, in the South West State of Somalia. It is 32 miles (51 kilometers) from the national capital of Somalia, Mogadishu. The nearest airport to Mubaarak is the K50 Airstrip, and the singular road that connects the two is named Marka-Afgooye Road. Mubaarak is situated 219 feet (67 meters) above sea level.

== Etymology ==
Mubarak (Mubaarak) is a name meaning "Blessed". It is the passive participle of the verb bāraka (بارَكَ), which is associated with growth and blessing. It comes from the Latinate name "Benidictus", or literally "Well Spoken".

== See also ==
- Genale
- Somaliland
- Awdheegle
- Buulo Mareer
- K50 Airstrip
