= Battle of Buulo Mareer =

Attack of ATMIS in Buulo Mareer, 26 May 2023

Coordinates: 1.6298°N 44.5196°E

Battle of Buulo-Mareer
- Part of the War in Somalia
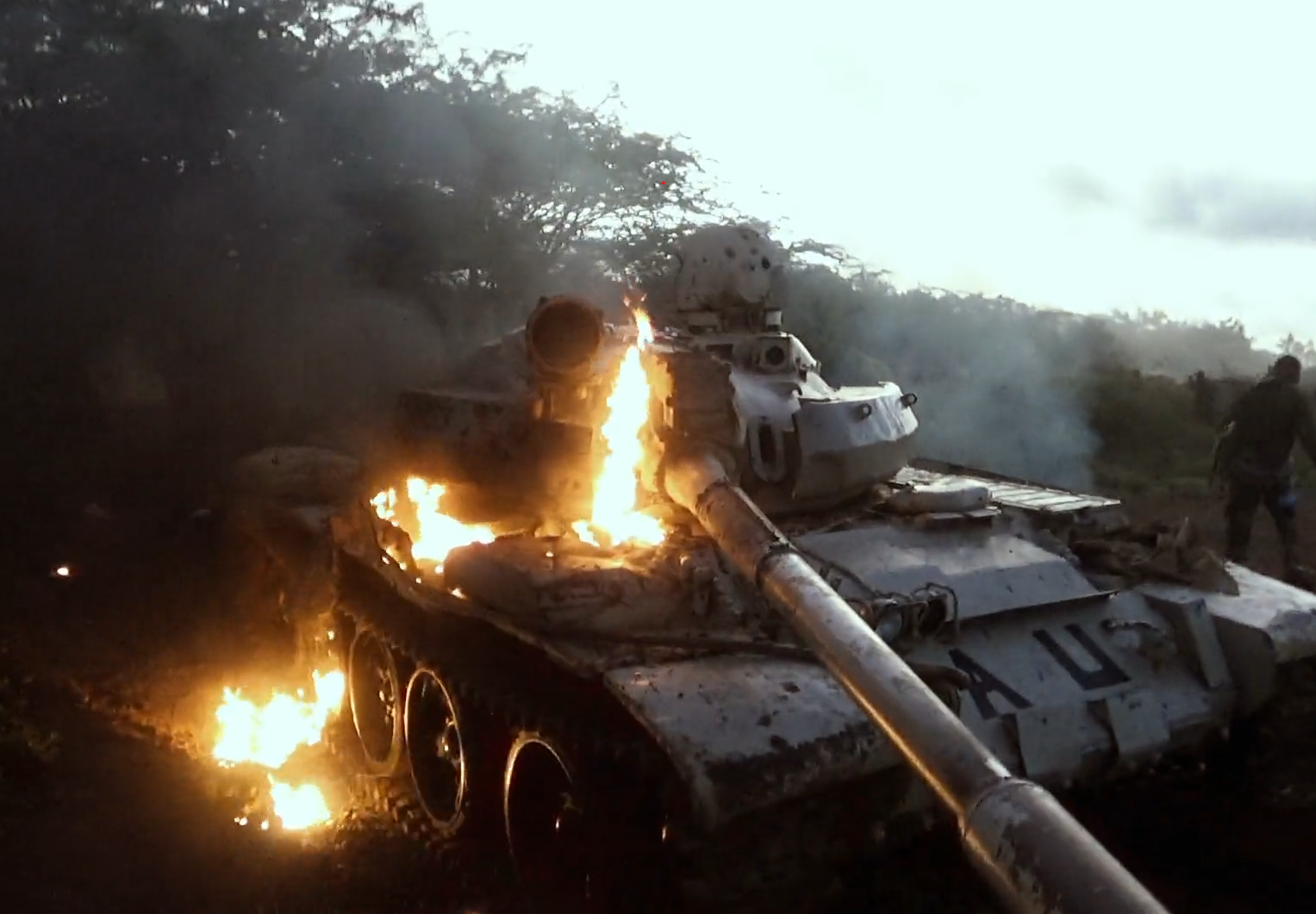
- UPDF T-54/55 tank destroyed by Al-Shabaab insurgents
Date	26 May 2023
Location	Buulo Mareer, Somalia
Result	Al-Shabaab victory, UPDF retreat: Militants take full control of Buulo-Mareer FOB; Deadliest attack on both ATMIS and Ugandan forces in Somalia to date; Buulo-Mareer recaptured by ATMIS troops 6 days later

Belligerents
al-Shabaab	ATMIS; Uganda

Commanders and leaders
Ahmad Diriye	Lt. Col. Edward Nyororo †; Uganda Maj. John Oluka; Maj. Obbo

Units involved
Fighters from Lower Shabelle region	Uganda Battle Group 37

Strength
±800 fighters (Ugandan claim)	221 soldiers

Casualties and losses
Unknown	54 killed (per UPDF); 137–200 killed (per Al-Shabaab); Several captured Unknown wounded
- Buulo Mareer, Somalia

The battle of Buulo Mareer took place on 26 May 2023, when Al-Shabaab fighters stormed an African Union military camp manned by Ugandan forces in the town of Bulo Marer, Lower Shabelle, Somalia.

The attack remains the deadliest on ATMIS troops (successor to AMISOM) since their formation in April 2022 and is also Uganda's worst defeat in Somalia since its deployment in February 2007.

== Background ==
Buulo-Mareer is a strategic town in the region of Lower Shabelle, and was captured by African Union Mission in Somalia (AMISOM) forces during Operation Indian Ocean in August 2014, after being an Al-Shabaab stronghold since November 2008.

Ever since the capture of the town, Al-Shabaab has been using a series of guerilla tactics to harass the UPDF and SNA troops stationed there, such as the use of IEDs, suicide attacks, mortar attacks and road ambushes, with the most prominent being in April 2018, when Al-Shabaab launched an assault on the AMISOM base in the town, killing at least 46 UPDF soldiers according to local sources, although they failed to overrun the base, and were forced to flee after facing heavy resistance from the UPDF forces there, losing around 30 fighters.

== Lead up to the Attack ==
Weeks prior to the attack, there was an increase in clashes between Al-Shabaab and UPDF troops in the Lower Shabelle region, with the most notable ones being:

- On April 15, an ambush on a UPDF convoy travelling on the outskirts of Janaale left 9 UPDF soldiers dead, according to Al-Shabaab claims, with the Somali government claiming to have foiled the ambush, killing 9 militants, posting photos of what appears to be 4 dead militants . Al-Shabaab released a footage of the ambush several days later, showing the bodies of 3 UPDF soldiers, and weapons captured from the troops..
- On May 18, an IED targeting a SNA/UPDF convoy travelling on the Merca-Afgooye road left 27 soldiers dead (22 SNA, 5 UPDF)

Although these operations didn't inflict heavy casualties on the UPDF troops, it was an increase from initially no attacks on UPDF troops for the last several months due to an anti Al-Shabaab military offensive launched by the FGS in Central Somalia on August, shifting the groups' primary focus on SNA in Central Somalia and away from the ATMIS troops in the South.

== Battle ==
On the night of the attack, increased Al-Shabaab activities were detected on the outskirts of the town of Qoryoley. Based on the movements, it was highly anticipated that the militants were most likely to attack either Qoryoley or Awdhegle, both towns bearing a fairly distant proximity to Buulo-Mareer. The UPDF troops in those towns stayed on high alert, expecting the militants to attack their bases, while the UPDF troops stationed in Buulo-Mareer lowered their guard, which later proved to be a fatal mistake.

At approximately EST 05:00 (GMT+3), at least 3 SVBIED explosions were carried out by Al-Shabaab suicide bombers at several defense posts of the camp, killing the UPDF troops stationed there and breaching the base. This was immediately followed by a heavy assault carried out by a contingent of Al-Shabaab fighters storming the breached base from different directions, causing some UPDF troops to panic and flee, which caused disorganization among the units in the base.

In a propaganda footage later released by the group, the militants are seen heavily pressuring the UPDF troops in the base with intense gunfire using PK machine guns and rocket-propelled grenades (RPGs) in high numbers from different fronts.

Realizing their forces were vastly outnumbered, commanders Maj. Oluka and Maj. Obbo gave their platoons an order to retreat, which caused further disorganization and panic among the other platoons left defending the base from the attackers. This action would later lead to the 2 commanders facing a court-martial by the Ugandan military.

By 07:00 am, the base perimeters were overrun by the attackers, some of them which spilled into the base, finishing off the wounded troops in there, along with looting and destroying the base, while the rest pursued the retreating troops, resulting in a great number of soldiers killed, with some being captured alive, and some fortunately managing to escape by foot to the nearest ATMIS base, located about 10 kilometers North of Buulo-Mareer, in the village of Golweyn

After fully capturing the town, the militants entered it and looted SNA patrol posts which were vacated earlier by the Somali troops. They eventually withdrew from the town before ATMIS recaptured it on June 1.

== Aftermath ==
In a press release by Al-Shabaab hours after the attack, the militant group claimed responsibility for the attack, claiming to have killed at least 137 soldiers in the attack. Ugandan government officials denied those claims, stating that out of 221 soldiers stationed in the base, 54 were killed in the attack, claiming that Al-Shabaab's casualty figure was "grossly exaggerated".

Al-Shabaab went on to release a 53-minute footage of the attack on the base several days later, showing the bodies of at least 45 UPDF soldiers, among them the body of Lt. Col. Edward Nyororo, the highest ranking commander in the base, who allegedly shot himself dead when the militants entered the base as a means to avoid capture. The militant group later raised the casualty figure to "nearly 200", in an updated press release from a senior Al-Shabaab official.

Several Ugandan soldiers were also captured as prisoners of war.

Furthermore, there were four UPDF soldiers who managed to hide from the militants in dense bushes on the outskirts of Buulo-Mareer, allegedly surviving on their urine for six days until the town was recaptured by ATMIS reinforcements on May 31.

In an interview with one of the survivors, he claims that on the night prior to the attack, the local town farmers were attending to their crops near the UPDF base a little later than usual, which caused the soldiers to mistaken the advancing Al-Shabaab militants for local farmers when they approached the base, delaying their reaction.

This could possibly hint that the town locals worked with Al-Shabaab in the planning of the attack, which has been seen before in previous attacks on African Union troops like the Battle of Leego in 2015, Battle of El Adde in 2016, Battle of Kulbiyow in 2017, when the locals provided Al-Shabaab with intel and helped them in capturing escaped soldiers. In a short clip posted on social media by a Buulo-Mareer resident, town locals can be seen looting from the UPDF base, taking items once belonging to the troops there, shortly after Al-Shabaab overran the base.

In November 2023, a Ugandan court-martial sitting in Mogadishu found Major Oluka and Colonel Deo Akiki guilty of cowardice and failure to respond to warnings of the impending attack and ordered their dismissal from the service. Four non-commissioned officers were also convicted for their failure to protect military equipment.

== Reactions ==
The United States Department of State expressed its "deepest condolences" to relatives and friends of the victims and wished to "a full recovery to those injured."

== Tactical Failures ==
In a public statement made by President Yoweri Museveni days later in Kampala, he criticized the UPDF of corruption, claiming that instead of sending 'battle-hardened soldiers', 'cooks and bodyguards' are sent to Somalia as a means to make money instead of looking at the risks. He added that "this unfortunate incident should be used to remind all those concerned, that operations in Somalia and other theatres, are combat missions and not welfare missions where you can access UN allowances", he said in the statement. "Somalia is a very dangerous place... if you go there like that, you [will] end up with a bad situation for yourself."

Museveni also claimed that US and Turkish drones were present during the battle, but did not cooperate with each other nor the UPDF troops when the camp came under attack. He also claimed that the militants who stormed the base were around 800, which raised questions among the public about how 800 militants were able to bypass security and carry out such a high-level attack.

AFRICOM, on the other hand, stated in a press release hours later to have carried out an airstrike against the militants during the attack, claiming to have "destroyed weapons and equipment unlawfully taken by Al-Shabaab fighters", but didn't state whether any Al-Shabaab militants were killed in the airstrike, only stating that no civilians were harmed.
