= 2018 African Union base attack in Bulo Marer =

Battle in the Somali Civil War

- Part of Part of Somali Civil War (2009–present)
Date	1 April 2018
Location	Bulo Marer, Somalia
Result	Losses on both sides; Attacks repulsed

Belligerents
Al-Shabaab	AMISOM Federal Government of Somalia

Strength
~100	Unknown

Casualties and losses
14 killed (Al-Shabaab claim); 30 killed (Ugandan army claim)	: 4 killed, 6 wounded (Ugandan army claim); 46 killed (local report); 59 killed (Al-Shabaab claim) (Somalia) : 1 killed, several wounded (local report)

On 1 April 2018, Al-Shabaab fighters attacked an AMISOM base in Bulo Marer in the Lower Shebelle region of Somalia.

== Attack ==
Two trucks filled with explosives blew up at the AMISOM military camp in Bula Marer, 110 km south of Mogadishu. Then about 100 Al-Shabaab militants attacked the base with gunfire. Another suicide bomber rammed his vehicle packed with explosives into a military convoy carrying Ugandan soldiers from Golweyn. According to the Deputy Governor of Lower Shabelle region Ali Nur Mohamed, AMISOM troops destroyed the vehicle with a rocket propelled grenade. The militants also attacked a third AMISOM base in Barawe with mortars and launched infantry attacks on two Somali government positions in Qoryoley and Mashallay. These attacks were reportedly intended to distract the troops in those camps from supporting the forces in Bulo Marer. Witnesses said Al-Shabaab terrorists attacked civilians and set houses and shops on fire after they raided the military base.

Ali Nur Mohamed told VOA Somali that AMISOM and Somali troops repulsed all attacks.

== Casualties ==
The death toll was not clear. Uganda People's Defense Force spokesman Richard Karemire said four Ugandan peacekeepers were killed and six AMISOM troops injured. Thirty Al-Shabaab terrorists were killed according to his reports. Al-Shabaab's military operations spokesperson Abdiaziz Abu Mus'ab said that the group lost only 14 fighters and killed at least 59 African Union soldiers. Abdi Nur Hashi, a Somali military colonel stationed near the base, told the Guardian that as many as 46 Ugandan troops died in the attack. One Somali soldier died and several others were injured.
