= French ship Mistral (L9013) =

French amphibious assault ship

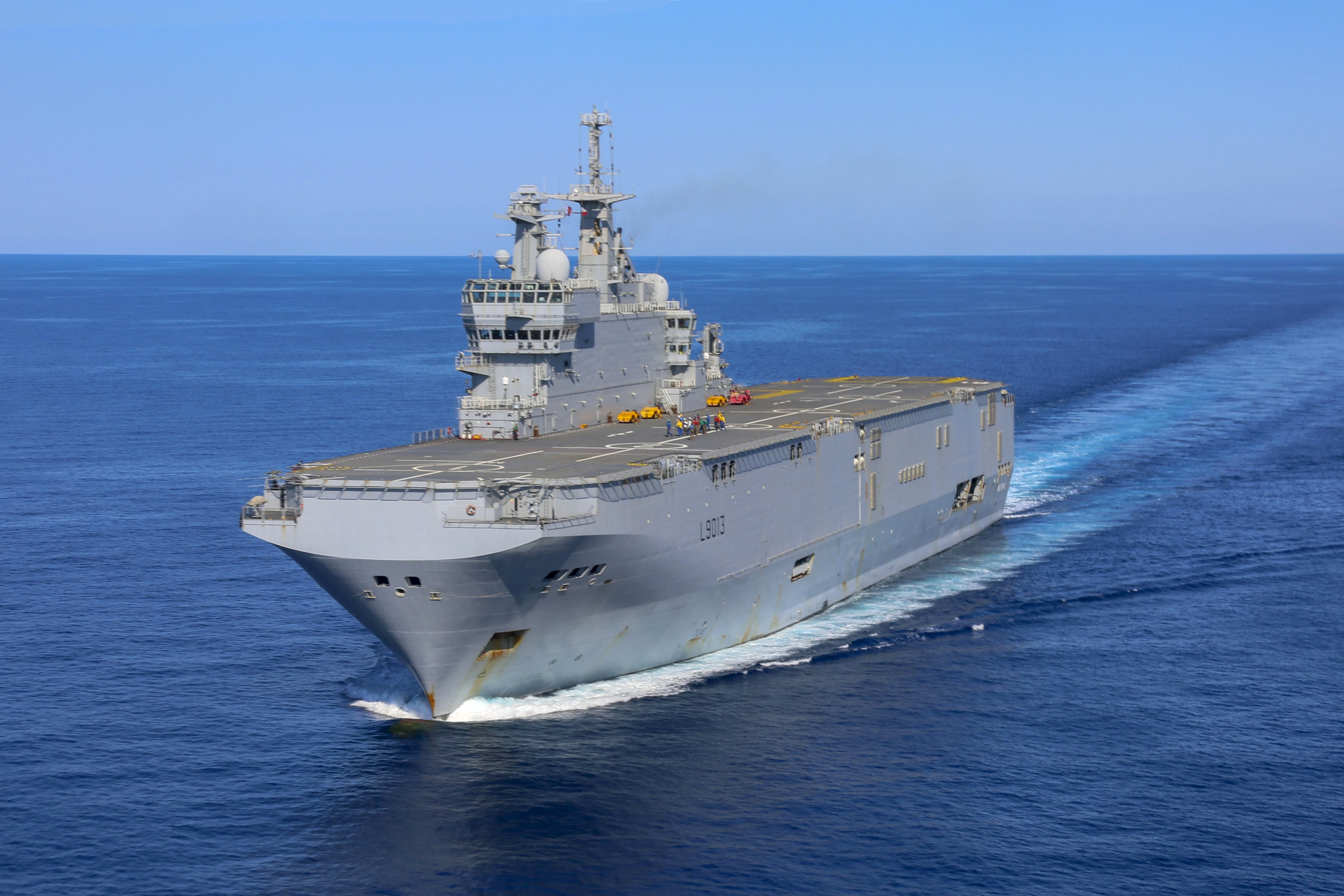
- Mistral in the Mediterranean Sea on 24 June 2020

History

France
- Namesake: Wind Mistral
- Builder: Arsenal de Brest, Chantiers de Saint-Nazaire
- Laid down: 10 July 2003 (aft section at Brest); 13 October 2003 (bow section at Saint-Nazaire)
- Launched: 6 October 2004 in Brest
- Commissioned: February 2006
- Home port: Toulon
- Identification: Pennant number: L 9013; Deck Code: MI
- Status: In service

General characteristics
- Class & type: Mistral-class amphibious assault ship
- Displacement: 16,500 t (16,200 long tons) (empty); 21,300 t (21,000 long tons) (full load); 32,300 t (31,800 long tons) (with ballasts)
- Length: 199 m (652 ft 11 in)
- Beam: 32 m (105 ft 0 in)
- Draught: 6.3 m (20 ft 8 in)
- Propulsion: Motorisation : 2 × Mermaïd electric motors (2 × 7 MW); 2 × 5-bladed propellers; Electrical plant: 4 × Wärtsilä diesels-alternators 16 V32 (6.2 MW) + 1 × Wärtsilä Vaasa auxiliary diesel-alternator 18V200 (3 MW)
- Speed: 18.8 knots (34.8 km/h; 21.6 mph)
- Range: 10,800 km (6,700 mi) at 18 kn (33 km/h; 21 mph); 19,800 km (12,300 mi) at 15 kn (28 km/h; 17 mph)
- Capacity: 2 barges, one Leclerc battalion, 70 vehicles
- Complement: 20 officers, 80 petty officers, 60 quartermasters, 450 passengers (900 for a short cruise), 150 men operational headquarter
- Armament: 2 × Simbad systems; 2 × 30 mm Breda-Mauser; 4 × 12.7 mm M2-HB Browning machine guns
- Aircraft carried: 16 heavy or 35 light helicopters

Mistral (L9013) is an amphibious assault ship, a type of helicopter carrier, of the French Navy. She is the fourth vessel to bear the name, and is the lead ship of the Mistral-class amphibious assault ships.

== Construction and career ==
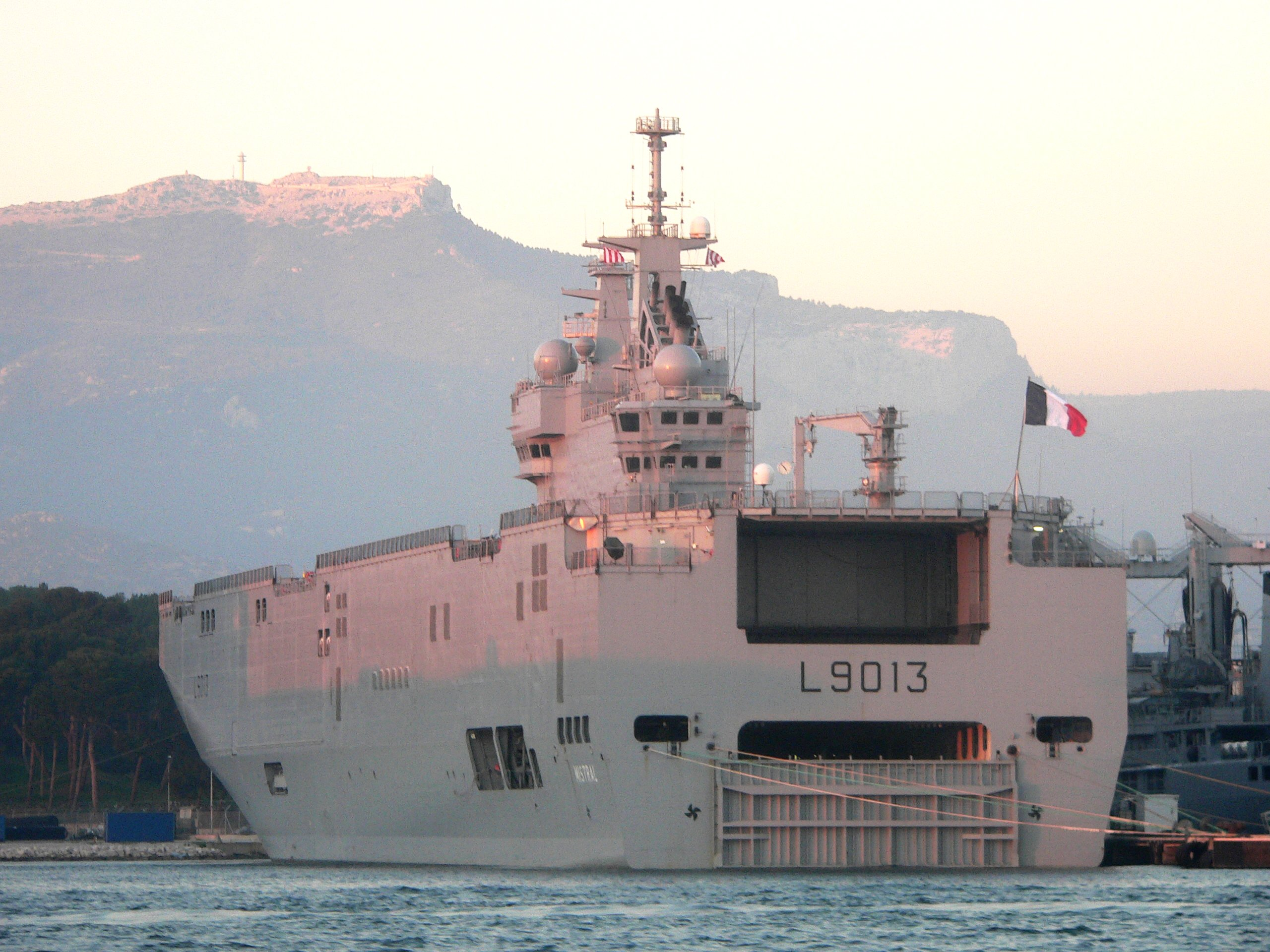
Mistral at the military port of Toulon in 2006

Mistral began sea trials in January 2005, and was commissioned in February 2006. She departed from Toulon for her first long-range journey in March, sailing through the Mediterranean Sea, Suez Canal, and the Red Sea to Djibouti and India, before returning to France. In July, to ensure the safety of European citizens in the context of the 2006 Israel-Lebanon conflict, France set up Opération Baliste. Mistral was the flagship of the fleet unit off Lebanon, escorted by the frigates Jean Bart and Jean de Vienne, and along with another amphibious assault ship, Siroco.

On 16 May 2008, the Burmese United Nations (UN) ambassador accused France of deploying Mistral to the Burmese coast for military purposes. The French UN ambassador denied this, stating that she was instead carrying 1,500 tons of relief supplies.

In March 2011 Mistral was deployed to Libyan waters to help aid the joint NATO effort to repatriate tens of thousands of Egyptian refugees fleeing the violence in Libya.

In January 2013, escorted by Chevalier Paul, Mistral took part in the ill-fated operation to retrieve Denis Allex, a DGSE officer held hostage in Bulo Marer.

On 22 May 2022, Mistral, operating in the Gulf of Guinea in conjunction with the La Fayette-class frigate, Courbet, was involved in the seizure of almost two tons of drugs.
