= Bulo Marer hostage rescue attempt =

2013 French military operation against Islamist group al-Shabaab in Somalia

- Part of the Somali Civil War (2009–present)
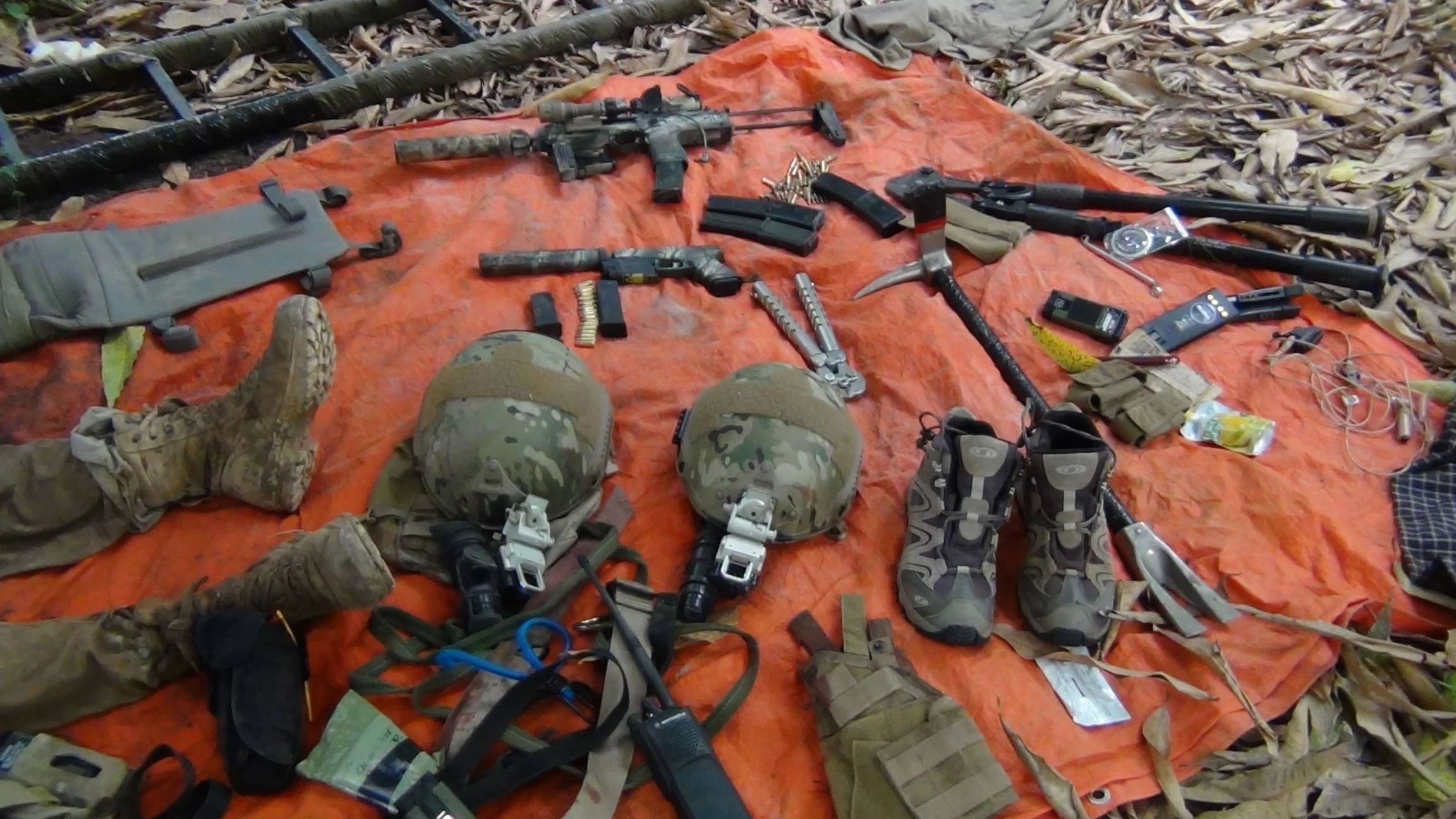
- Weapons captured by al-Shabaab from the DGSE Action Division
Date	11 January 2013
Location	Bulo Marer, Lower Shabelle, Somalia 01°37′47″N 44°31′29″E
Result	Rescue attempt failed

Belligerents
France Supported by: United States	Al-Shabaab

Commanders and leaders
(France) Cap. Patrice Rebout †	Abu Hafsa al Waajidi † (Al-Shabaab governor of Bulo Mareer)

Strength
50 operators (DGSE Action Division); 5 helicopters	150 militants (French claim)

Casualties and losses
(France) 2 commandos killed, 1 injured Hostage executed	17 militants killed (French claim)
- 8 to several dozens of civilians killed by French commandos

On 11 January 2013, the French military launched an unsuccessful operation in Bulo Marer, Lower Shabelle, Somalia to rescue French hostage Denis Allex from the Islamic militant organization al-Shabaab. Allex was executed in response, and two French commandos, at least 17 al-Shabaab militants and at least eight civilians were killed in the firefight.

== Background ==
Denis Allex and Marc Aubrière were deployed to Mogadishu, Somalia in 2009 by the French Directorate-General for External Security (DGSE) to train soldiers from the Transitional Federal Government. On 14 July 2009, both men were kidnapped from the Sahafi Hotel where they were staying by armed men impersonating police. The captors loaded the men into a truck and left the hotel, but later the truck broke down. While the truck was incapacitated, the captors were confronted by members of the Hizbul Islam militia, who demanded custody of the hostages. The two men were then taken away by fighters from Hizbul Islam and later Allex was transferred to the allied al-Shabaab.

On 25 August 2009, according to his version of events, Aubrière, who was being held in Mogadishu, escaped from his captors in the middle of the night while they slept. He then walked for five hours to the Somali government compound in the city and, from there, was transported back to France. However, Aubrière's account was disputed as being improbable and it was suggested by them that his release was secured after the French government paid a ransom; they said they did not.

US and French technical and human intelligence teams, including a US Army Special Mission Unit specialized in signals intelligence, and U-28A surveillance flights from Djibouti were immediately deployed in an exhaustive effort to locate the hostage. Somali assets recruited by the DGSE identified several locations where the agent had been; the agent was constantly moved by the terrorists mainly because of the fighting between al-Shabaab and African Union troops. US and French satellites and unmanned reconnaissance flights monitored the hostage's location for several months as operators from DGSE Division Action unit planned the rescue mission.

Erard Corbin de Mangoux, the then-director general of the DGSE intended to secure the release of Allex before the end of his term through a negotiation of a ransom. The DGSE additionally coordinated secret diplomatic negotiations with Eritrea to free Allex. Eritrean intelligence played a key role in mediating with Al-Shabaab, with the French ambassador to Eritrea, Roger Auque, who had himself been a hostage in Lebanon, maintained contact with Yemane Gebreab, a senior advisor to Eritrean President Isaias Afwerki, to facilitate negotiations. However, Al-Shabaab's demands—primarily the release of imprisoned Islamists abroad—proved too high. Despite France’s willingness to pay a ransom, disagreements among Somali clans further complicated the negotiations.

In December 2012, when news reached the DGSE that the hostage's health was deteriorating, President François Hollande ordered the DGSE Division Action to prepare to carry out a previously opposed hostage rescue mission. The DGSE sent a 50-man Close Quarter Battle Group of the Division Action (known as CPIS) to Camp Lemonnier where they trained for the mission with a small team of United States Navy SEALs from Red squadron, DEVGRU. In addition to the latest intelligence from Somali agents, the US also provided surveillance assets, including a JSOC Predator UAV based at Camp Lemonnier and air cover from both AC-130 Spectres and an RQ-4 Global Hawk UAV during the mission itself.

== Operation ==
At around 2:00 a.m. local time on 11 January 2013, 50 French Special Forces from the DGSE's highly secretive direct-action unit called "Division Action", supported by six helicopters dispatched from the Mistral (four EC-725 Caracal assault helicopters and two EC-665 Tiger combat helicopters of the Special Operations Command), assaulted an al-Shabaab position in Bulo Marer, Somalia, where Denis Allex was believed to be held. They encircled a small home on the outskirts of the town as numerous Al-Shabaab militants were inside, allegedly with Allex. According to an Al-Shabaab propaganda video released in 2014, one militant, only referred to as "M.K", claimed that his group had heard the French soldiers outside and alerted other militants inside. He then claims that he picked up a PK machine gun and immediately opened fire on a French soldier at the door. A fierce firefight lasting 45 minutes ensued, with Al-Shabaab reinforcements arriving around ten minutes after the initial assault began. Two French soldiers and 17 al-Shabaab fighters were killed, including the Al-Shabaab governor of Bulo Mareer, Sheikh Hassan. The French Special Forces later abandoned the operation. The French military believes that members of al-Shabaab executed Allex during the operation. However, al-Shabaab claimed that Allex was still alive and in its custody.

Additionally, the French military had reported that one soldier was missing; they were almost certain he was killed during the attack. Al-Shabaab claimed that it had captured the missing soldier, left lying wounded on the ground during the firefight, despite also releasing photographs of the dead soldier. In addition to the military casualties, eight civilians were also reportedly killed during the operation, including a pregnant woman, with others being wounded.

Following the raid, Al-Shabaab captured a range of weapons, of which they posted photos of online with the caption “A return of the crusades, but the cross could not save him from the sword." Among the items seized were two H&K MP7 submachine guns; the one on the left was equipped with an Aimpoint Micro T-1 or H-1, while the one on the right featured an Aimpoint CompM3. Additionally, a Glock pistol of an undetermined model was recovered. This Glock came with a loaded magazine featuring a grip extension and a +1-2 round baseplate, along with two other Glock magazines of different sizes and a suppressor, which suggested a threaded barrel that could be either factory or aftermarket. The raid also yielded Magpul 5.56mm PMAGs, which are large magazines with windowed bodies designed for the M4/M16 platform, and a 20-round magazine from the SG55x series, positioned between the larger Magpul magazines.

== Aftermath ==
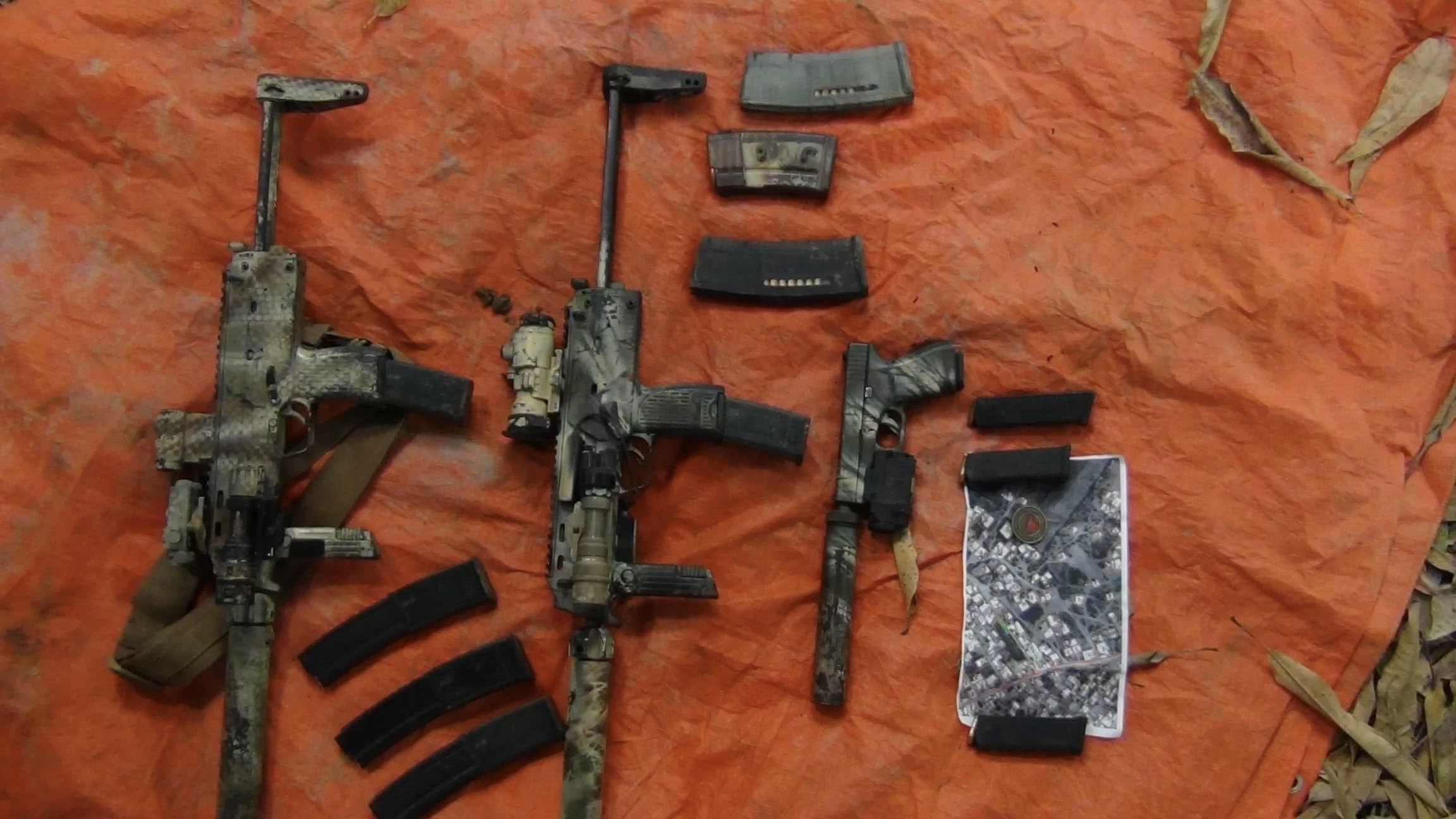
Weapons captured by al-Shabaab on the raid in Bulo Marer, posted online by the media wing of the militant group

On 13 January 2013, the Somali Federal Government held a press conference, where it condemned the Bulo Marer operation as unilateral and carried out without the knowledge or consent of the Somali authorities. The officials also extended their condolences to all casualties.

The following day, US President Barack Obama indicated in a War Powers Resolution letter to Congress that US Air Force warplanes had entered Somali airspace in limited support of the French rescue operation. However, he stated that they did not use weapons during the raid.

On 14 January 2013, al-Shabaab posted on their Twitter account a picture of the body of one of the French soldiers, describing him as the "leader" of the failed French commando raid in Somalia. The body was surrounded by captured military gear. This was confirmed to be the soldier missing in action. This soldier has yet to be identified. Three days later, Al-Shabaab announced, also through Twitter, that Allex had been sentenced to death in response to the French operation.

In August 2014, A video titled, “Beyond the Shadows: The Failed French Raid” was released by the media wing of Al-Shabaab. The video describes the failed attempt by France to rescue Allex in Bulo Mareer. The video also included interviews with an alleged spy who assisted the French prior to the operation.

== Civilian casualties ==
To preserve the element of surprise, the French commando unit executed around ten civilians during its advance, according to a DGSE officer. Journalist Vincent Nouzille, for his part, states that there were “several dozen civilians who fell victim to a ‘clean-up’ carried out by the French commandos in order to preserve the element of surprise throughout the approximately ten kilometers of their advance.”

== See also ==
- Foreign hostages in Somalia
- Rescue of Jessica Buchanan and Poul Hagen Thisted
