= Wanlaweyn District =

Wanlaweyn
- District
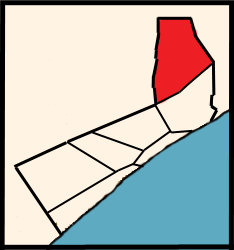
- Country: Somalia
- Region: Lower Shabelle
- Capital: Wanlaweyn
- Time zone: UTC+3 (EAT)

Wanlaweyn District (Somali: Degmada Wanlaweyn) is a district in the southeastern Lower Shabelle (Shabeellaha Hoose) region of Somalia. Its capital lies at Wanlaweyn.

== Administrative divisions ==
- Ceel Qorof
- Xako
- Qaandhoole
- Xologof
- Goobaanle
- Ceel Qorof
- Balad Amiin
- Ceel Caddow
- Danibo
- Afar Daar
