= Sarcade =

- Town
- Location in Somalia.
- Coordinates: 1°49′35″N 44°43′20″E
- Country: Somalia
- Region: Lower Shebelle
- Time zone: UTC+3 (EAT)

Sarcade (Somali: Sarcade) is a town in the southeastern Lower Shebelle (Shabeellaha Hoose) region of Somalia. It is situated 68 metres (226 feet) above sea level.
