= Yaq Domar =

Village in Somalia

Yaq Domar (also spelled Yaaq Doomaar) is a village located in Leego, Lower Shabelle, southern Somalia. It is one of the settlements administered by Leego District.
