= 2017 Golweyn ambush =

Ambush in Somalia

Golweyn ambush
- Part of the War in Somalia
- Map of Somalia, showing places significant for the ambush and its aftermath (clickable map)
Date	30 July 2017
Location	Golweyn, Lower Shebelle, Somalia
Result	Al-Shabaab victory
Territorial changes	AMISOM retreats from Leego, which is then captured by al-Shabaab

Belligerents
Al-Shabaab	AMISOM: Uganda; Federal Government of Somalia

Commanders and leaders
Unknown	(Uganda) Unidentified commanders †

Units involved
Unknown	Uganda People's Defence Force (UPDF): 7th Battalion, 22nd battlegroup; (Somalia) Somali Armed Forces (SNAF)

Casualties and losses
8 killed (local report); Heavy (Ugandan gov. claim)	Ugandan: 12 killed, 7 wounded (Ugandan gov. claim); 23 killed (Somali gov. claim); 39+ killed (al-Shabaab claim); Somali: 1 killed

The Golweyn ambush by al-Shabaab militants against an AMISOM convoy took place on 30 July 2017. Resulting in the death of several Ugandan soldiers, the attack seriously disrupted the control of pro-government forces over the Lower Shebelle region in Somalia, eventually leading to the fall of the strategically significant town of Leego to al-Shabaab.

== Background ==
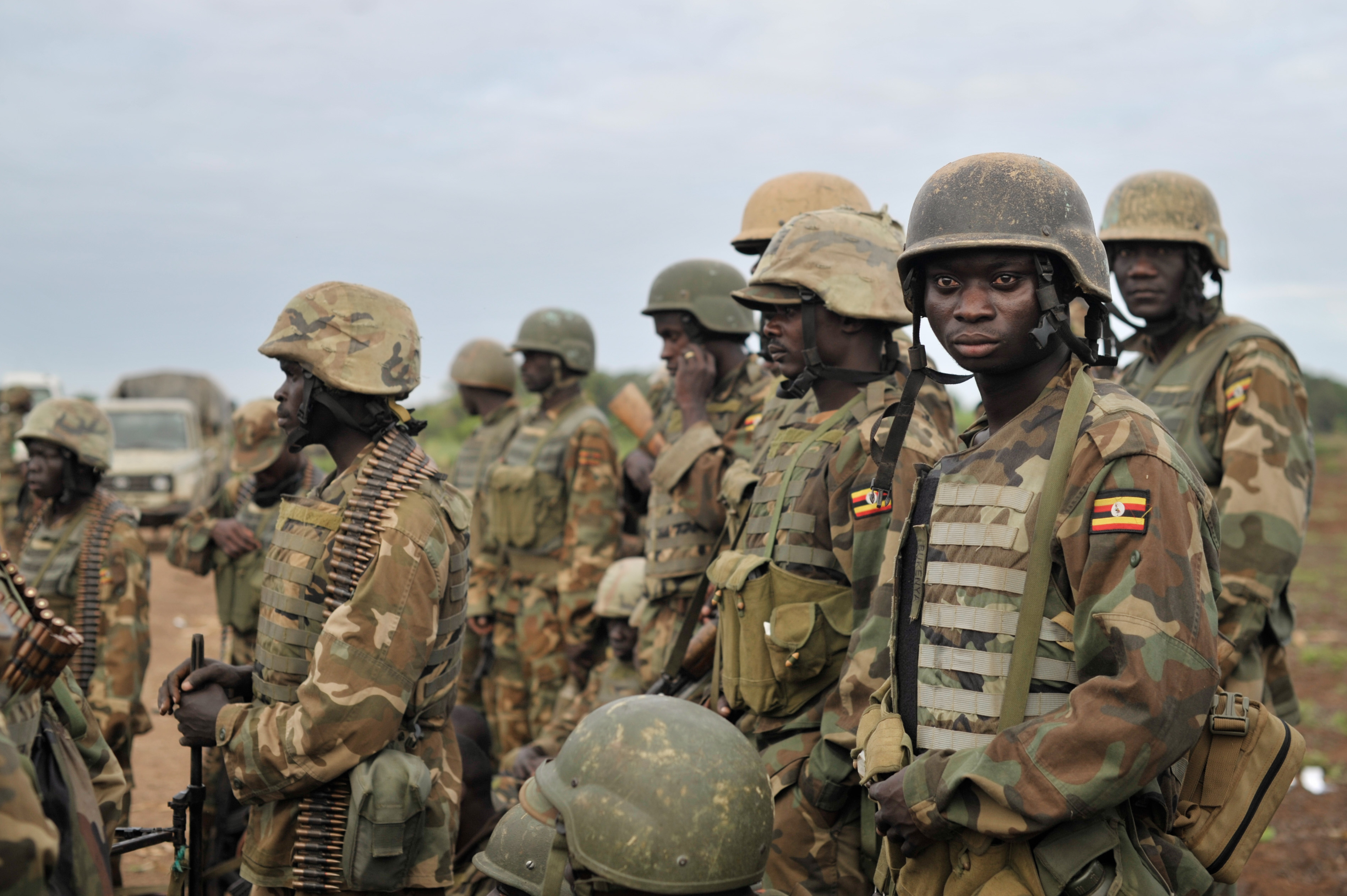
The area where the ambush occurred had been secured by the Uganda People's Defence Force since the Battle of Leego in 2015. Pictured are Ugandan soldiers during Operation Indian Ocean.

Much of Lower Shebelle, including Golweyn, was conquered from al-Shabaab by AMISOM and the Somali Armed Forces (SNAF) during Operation Indian Ocean in 2014, and had been secured by the Ugandan military since the deadly insurgent attack on the Burundian garrison of Leego in 2015. In 2016, however, offensive operations against al-Shabaab were reduced, allowing the militant group to rebuild its strength.

Despite al-Shabaab's growing power, mounting casualties among AMISOM peacekeepers and their already long presence in the war-torn country has led to plans to reduce AMISOM's presence in Somalia. Security responsibilities are supposed to be transferred to the Somali government's military. According to Lower Shebelle's deputy governor Ali Nur Mohamed, however, the SNAF units in his region have been weakened by factionalization, infighting and desertation. Because of that, they are not able to independently hold territory against insurgents, meaning that the presence of AMISOM troops in government-controlled areas of Lower Shebelle is crucial.

== Ambush ==
On early 30 July 2017, a military convoy consisting of parts of the UPDF's 7th Battalion of the 22nd battlegroup as well as some SNAF soldiers, left Shalanbod. The convoy, which was of company-strength, was either supposed to conduct a regular patrol on the Mogadishu-Barawa Main Supply Route, or transport supplies to the AMISOM/SNAF bases in Lower Shebelle. As the UPDF/SNAF forces entered the village of Golweyn, near Bulo Marer, an improvised explosive device on the road hit the convoy, whereupon heavily armed al-Shabaab fighters launched their assault. A fierce firefight ensued that lasted for about one hour, after which the militants retreated, reportedly taking the bodies of some dead Ugandan soldiers with them.

Although the exact Ugandan casualties are disputed, with the Ugandan military downplaying and al-Shabaab exaggerating them, they were heavier than those of the attackers. According to the Somali government, around 23 Ugandans were killed and numerous wounded, while al-Shabaab managed to take supplies and weaponry from the convoy.

== Aftermath: The fall of Leego ==
The most important effect of the ambush was to show that the important supply route between Mogadishu and Barawa was insecure and threatened by al-Shabaab. As result, AMISOM felt it had to deploy additional troops along the route in order to resecure it. The force chosen for this purpose was the Ugandan garrison of Leego, a strategically important town and major AMISOM military base. As the international peacekeeping forces were already suffering from manpower shortages, however, the Ugandans could not be replaced by other forces in time. When the UPDF soldiers consequently moved from Leego to Golweyn on 4 July, the former was left completely defenseless. Somali government officials protested this, saying that they had not been consulted and that without the AMISOM garrison Leego would soon fall to the insurgents; this promptly happened, as al-Shabaab immediately occupied Leego unopposed after the Ugandans had retreated.

This was a heavy blow to AMISOM and the Somali government, as Leego had controlled another important supply route from Mogadishu to the regions of Bay and Bakool; thousands of pro-government soldiers in these areas were thus effectively cut off and could only be supplied or reinforced by air. On 6 July, the AMISOM high command reportedly assured Lower Shebelle's government that the Ethiopian military would soon send new troops in order to reconquer Leego.
