= Opération Baliste =

Opération Baliste was a French aeronaval operation off Lebanon aimed at securing citizens of the European Union in the context of the 2006 Lebanon War.

== Components ==
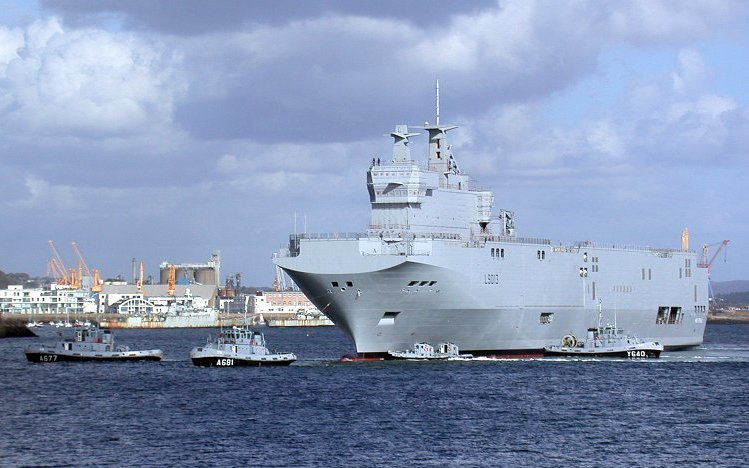
Amphibious assault ship Mistral

Opération Baliste employed 1,700 men under Counter Admiral Xavier Magne. The operation was threefold :

- An aerial transport group, composed with one Transall C-160 and 3 Eurocopter Cougar
- A battlegroup of the French Army, including motorised infantry, engineering, ALAT and light armour.
- An amphibious naval group composed with the amphibious operation ships Mistral and Siroco, and the frigates Jean Bart and Jean de Vienne. The group had hospital capabilities, combat helicopters, transport helicopters, and landing craft.

== History ==
On 18 August 2006, 14,500 people had been evacuated (including 11,300 French citizens). On 20 August, the amphibious assault ship Foudre and the frigate Cassard sailed from Toulon to join the theatre and convoy elements from the 2nd and 13th Regiments of Engineering, as well as over 100 engineering vehicles for the UNIFIL

On 3 October, an Israeli fighter penetrated the 2-nautical-mile (3.7 km) defence perimeter of the stealth frigate Courbet, triggering a diplomatic incident. Israel apologised after official protests from the French government.
