= Abdi Sharif =

Somali footballer (born 2001)

Personal information
- Full name: Abdulrahman Mohamoud Sharif
- Date of birth: 1 January 2001 (age 25)
- Place of birth: Qoryoley, Somalia
- Height: 1.85 m (6 ft 1 in)
- Position: Midfielder

Team information
- Current team: Connah's Quay Nomads
- Number: 23

Youth career
- 2010–2019: Liverpool

Senior career*
| Years | Team | Apps | (Gls) |
| 2019–2021 | Liverpool | 0 | (0) |
| 2022–2024 | Wigan Athletic | 1 | (0) |
| 2023–2024 | → AFC Telford United (loan) | 2 | (1) |
| 2025 | Aberystwyth Town | 10 | (0) |
| 2025– | Connah's Quay Nomads | 34 | (1) |

International career^{‡}
| 2023– | Somalia | 4 | (0) |
- * Club domestic league appearances and goals as of 06:36, 7 November 2026 (UTC) ‡ National team caps and goals as of 27 September 2025

Abdulrahman Mohamoud Sharif (born 1 January 2001) is a Somali footballer who plays as a midfielder for Cymru Premier club Connah's Quay Nomads and the Somalia national team.

== Early life ==
Abdulrahman Mohamoud Sharif was born in Somalia on 1 January 2001 before he emigrated to the United Kingdom with his family in 2004. He grew up in Toxteth with his nine older brothers.

== Club career ==
=== Liverpool ===
Sharif spent his youth with the Academy at Liverpool, spending three years training with the club before he joined officially at the age of nine. He turned professional at Anfield in July 2019. He suffered an Anterior cruciate ligament injury and was given a one-year contract extension to allow him the opportunity to recover.

=== Wigan Athletic ===
He spent a year unattached and then joined Wigan Athletic following a successful trial in the summer of 2022. He scored goals in friendlies against Hyde United and Alvechurch during his trial spell. He made his senior debut for the club on the last day of the 2022–23 season, in a 0–0 draw with Rotherham United at the DW Stadium. This made him the first Somali to play in the EFL Championship.

He joined National League North club AFC Telford United on loan on 25 November 2023. He returned to Wigan in the new year.

He was released by Wigan at the end of the 2023–24 season.

=== Aberystwyth Town ===
On 10 January 2025, Sharif joined Cymru Premier club Aberystwyth Town.

=== Connah's Quay Nomads ===
On 2 July 2025, following Aberystwyth's relegation to the Cymru South, Sharif joined Cymru Premier club Connah's Quay Nomads. in December 2025 he signed a new deal with the club.

== International career ==
Sharif was called up to represent Somalia for the first time in October 2023.

As of match played 14 October 2025

Appearances and goals by national team and year
| National team | Year | Apps | Goals |
|---|---|---|---|
| Somalia | 2023 | 1 | 0 |
| Somalia | 2024 | 0 | 0 |
| Somalia | 2025 | 3 | 0 |
| Total | | 4 | 0 |

== Style of play ==
A central midfielder, he earned praise from Liverpool coach Steven Gerrard for his stamina. He can also play at right-back and was a centre-forward in his youth.

== Career statistics ==
As of match played 6 December 2023

Appearances and goals by club, season and competition
| Club | Season | League | | | FA Cup | | EFL Cup | | Other | | Total | |
| Club | Season | Division | Apps | Goals | Apps | Goals | Apps | Goals | Apps | Goals | Apps | Goals |
|---|---|---|---|---|---|---|---|---|---|---|---|---|
| Liverpool U21 | 2020–21 | — | | | — | | — | | 2 (Note: Appearances in the EFL Trophy) | 0 | 2 | 0 |
| Wigan Athletic | 2022–23 | EFL Championship | 1 | 0 | 0 | 0 | 0 | 0 | 0 | 0 | 1 | 0 |
| Wigan Athletic | 2023–24 | EFL League One | 0 | 0 | 0 | 0 | 0 | 0 | 1 | 0 | 1 | 0 |
| Wigan Athletic | Total | | 1 | 0 | 0 | 0 | 0 | 0 | 1 | 0 | 2 | 0 |
| AFC Telford United (loan) | 2022–23 | National League North | 2 | 0 | — | | — | | 0 | 0 | 2 | 0 |
| Career total | | | 3 | 0 | 0 | 0 | 0 | 0 | 3 | 0 | 6 | 0 |
