= Sablale =

- Town
- Location within Somalia
- Coordinates: 1°22′59.74″N 43°31′14″E
- Country: Somalia
- State: South West State of Somalia
- Region: Lower Shabelle
- District: Sablale District

Government
  - Control: Al-Shabaab
- Time zone: UTC+3 (EAT)

Sablale is a town district in the southeastern Lower Shabelle region of Somalia. The broader Sablale District has a total population of 143,055 residents. The majority of Sablale residents are Dabarre sub-division of the wider Digil Rahanweyn Somalis.
