= Sablale District =

Sablale
- District
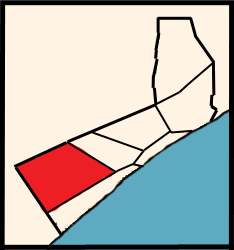
- Country: Somalia
- Region: Lower Shabelle
- Capital: Sablale
- Control: Al-Shabaab
- Time zone: UTC+3 (EAT)

Sablale District (Somali: Degmada Sablaale) is a district in the southeastern Lower Shabelle (Shabeellaha Hoose) region of Somalia. Its capital lies at Sablale. The broader Sablale District has a total population of 143,055 residents.
