= Qoryoley =

Qoryoley Qoryooley Qornyooley Coriole, Coriolei, Koryoley, Qoreyole, Qoryolay
- Town
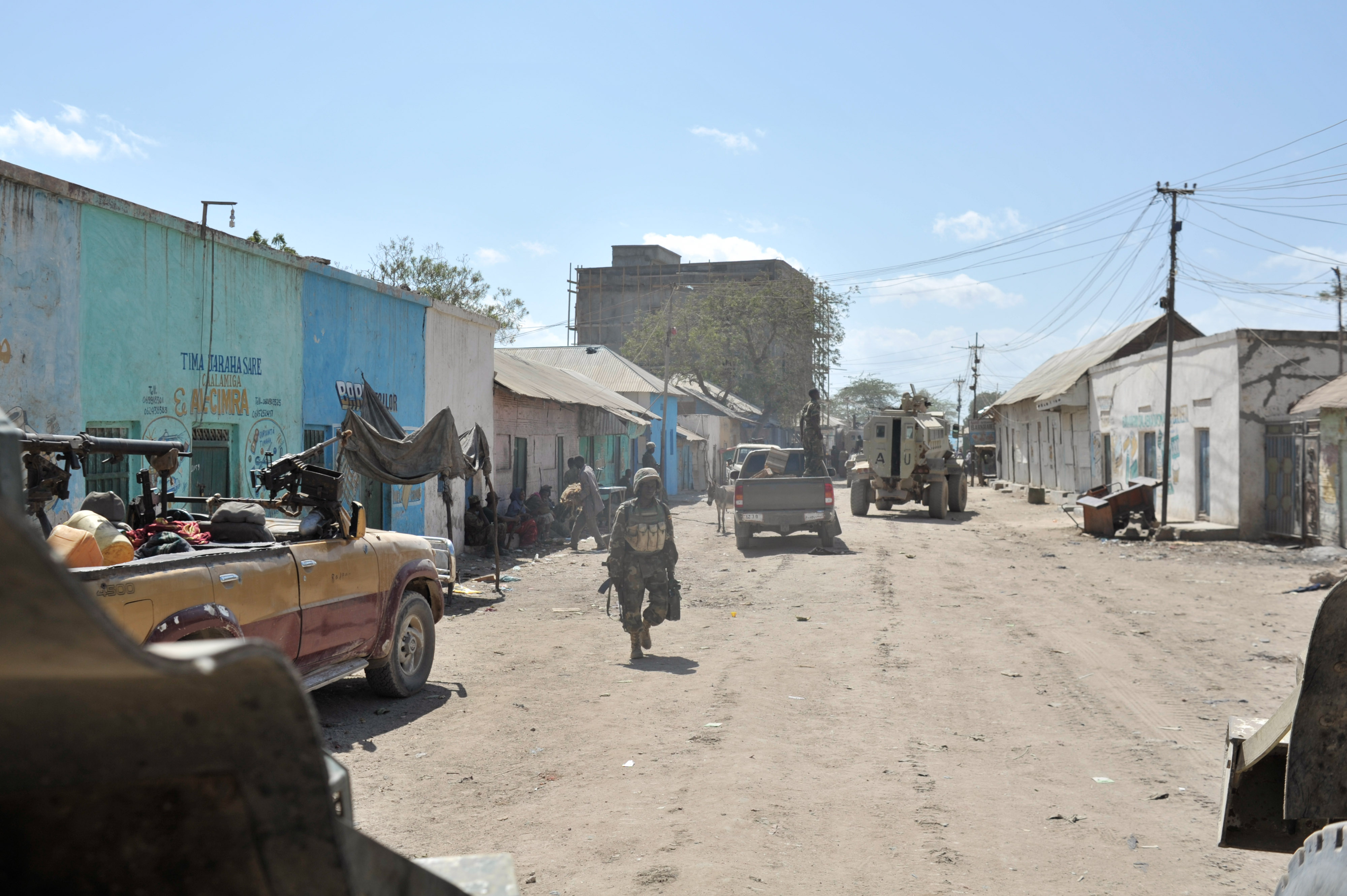
- Qoryoley after liberation in 2014

- Location in Somalia
- Coordinates: 1°47′16″N 44°31′48″E
- Country: Somalia
- State: South West State of Somalia
- Region: Lower Shabelle
- District: Qoriyoley District

Government
  - Mayor: Seyd-Ali Ibrahim Aliyow

Area
  - Total: 50 km^{2} (19 sq mi)

Population (2022)
  - Total: 124,000
- Time zone: UTC+3 (EAT)

Qoryoley (Maay: Qornyooley, Somali: Qoryooley, Arabic: قوريولي) is a town in the Lower Shebelle region of the South West State of Somalia. It is located 123 kilometers southwest of the capital city Mogadishu and 23 kilometers west of the coastal city of Merca.

== History ==
Qoryoley was named after a Somali man named Ahmed Qoryoley who founded the town before Somali independence.

After the fall of the Siad Government, Abdirahmaan Sheikh Mohamed Khadi took the position of district mayor. He was the youngest mayor of all Somali mayors in 2007.

On June 12th, 2024, two clan militias, the Garre and the Jiiddo, battled for over four hours.

=== Al-Shabaab ===
On March 10th, 2014, a battle took place just outside Qoryoley between Al-Shabaab and Somali and AMISOM (now ATMIS) forces resulting in the death of four soldiers and a civilian. On March 22nd, 2014, Ugandan troops in AMISOM liberated Qoryoley from al-Shabaab control, in Operation Eagle. On June 26, 2015, al-Shabaab raided a military base in Leego, which made AMISOM withdrawal from multiple areas, including Qoryoley, which on July 4, was retaken by al-Shabaab. In May 2017, fighters from al-Shabaab attacked Somali National Army (SNA) bases. In the assault, two soldiers were injured. In 2018, a Somali government position in Qoryoley was attacked, five military camps being the target, resulting in the deaths of a civilian and twelve of their own militants. Militants raided the El-Salini military base, outside of Qoryoley in September 2019, killing an unknown number of soldiers. On February 19th, 2020, an armed assault by assailants and suicide bombers at El-Salini base occurred, against Somali and ATMIS forces. Casualties vary across sources, but it is estimated as 20-31. On July 4th, 2023, an assault took place on a military base and the district commissioner’s building, with al-Shabaab claiming responsibility. The same year on September 1st, a ~2 hour-long attempted seizure of Qoryoley by al-Shabaab occurred, halted by SNA forces.

== Demographics ==
In 2000, Qoryoley had an estimated population of around 62,700. The largest group of Qoryoley residents Garre .

The broader Qoriyoley District had a population of 134,205 in 2024. In 2006, Qoryoley had an estimated population of 51,720.

In 2022, Qoryoley had an estimated 120,000 people. 75% were Garre clan whereas the remaining 25% were of various subclans.

== Climate ==
Qoryoley is a hot and arid town, only receiving 296 millimeters of rain per year, on average. The wettest month is May, with 65 millimeters of rain, and the driest is February, with 1 millimeter. The average temperature is 26°C (78.8°F). The hottest month is March, at 32°C (89.6°F), and the coldest is July, at 22°C (71.6°F).

Qoryooley

Climate chart (precipitation, max. and min. temperature)
J	F	M	A	M	J	J	A	S	O	N	D
3 35 22	1 37 23	10 39 24	27 35 25	65 28 23	30 26 19	63 24 19	26 27 19	13 31 21	27 30 22	23 30 22	8 32 23
- █ Average max. and min. temperatures in °C
- █ Precipitation totals in mm
Imperial conversion
J	F	M	A	M	J	J	A	S	O	N	D
0.1 95 72	0 99 73	0.4 102 75	1.1 95 77	2.6 82 73	1.2 79 66	2.5 75 66	1 81 66	0.5 88 70	1.1 86 72	0.9 86 72	0.3 90 73
- █ Average max. and min. temperatures in °F
- █ Precipitation totals in inches

== Notable people ==
Mukhtar Mohammed, a middle-distance runner.

Abdi Sharif, professional footballer and Somalia international.

== See also ==
Qoriyoley District
Garre
Jiiddo
Al-Shabaab (militant group)
