= K50 Airstrip =

Airport in Somalia

- IATA: none; ICAO: none

Summary
- Airport type: Public
- Operator: ADCO
- Serves: Mogadishu
- Location: Lower Shabelle, Somalia
- Elevation AMSL: 100 ft / 30 m
- Coordinates: 01°59.927′N 044°58.884′E

Map
- Location of airstrip in Somalia

Runways
Direction	Length		Surface
Direction	m	ft	Surface
04/22	1,850	6,070	Sand

K50 Airstrip is an airstrip in the Lower Shabelle region of Somalia. It serves the capital city, Mogadishu, and was at times its main airport.

== Overview ==
The name refers to the airstrip's location on the country's main NE/SW road, about 50 kilometres south-west of Mogadishu. In the late 2000s, K50 served as Mogadishu's main airport while Aden Adde International Airport was briefly shut down due to the 2006–2009 War in Somalia. The Somali-owned, Dubai Airport-based Daallo Airlines operated routes to and from K50 at one time.

The airstrip was mentioned in the book Quiet Warriors: Veteran's Military Service Memories, written by Blake E. Edwards.

== Facilities ==
The airstrip resides at an elevation of 100 feet (30 m) above mean sea level. It has one runway designated 04/22 with a compacted sand surface measuring 1,850 by 20 metres (6,070 ft × 66 ft).

== Airlines and destinations ==
The following airlines offer scheduled passenger service:

Airlines	Destinations
United Nations Humanitarian Air Service	Addis Ababa, Nairobi–Kenyatta
