= French frigate Courbet =

1994 La Fayette-class frigate

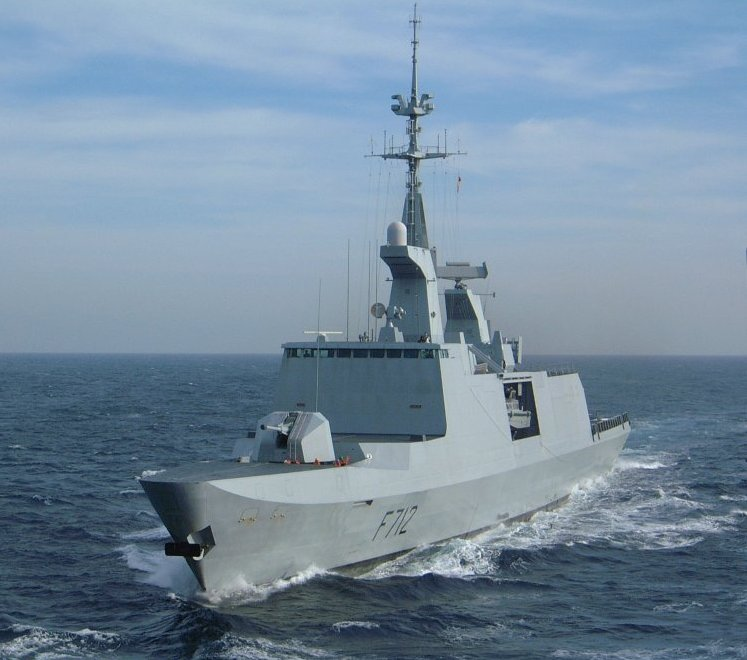

History

France
- Name: Courbet
- Namesake: Admiral Amédée Courbet
- Laid down: 15 September 1993
- Launched: 12 March 1994
- Commissioned: 1 April 1997
- Home port: Toulon
- Identification: MMSI number: 228731000
- Honours and awards: Flies the FNFL jack in honour of the battleship Courbet
- Status: In active service

General characteristics
- Class & type: La Fayette-class frigate
- Displacement: 3,280 t (3,230 long tons); 3,680 t (3,620 long tons) fully loaded
- Length: 125 m (410 ft 1 in)
- Beam: 15.4 m (50 ft 6 in)
- Draught: 4.8 m (15 ft 9 in)
- Propulsion: 4 SEMT Pielstick 12PA6V280 STC2 diesel engines, 16,000 kW (21,000 hp)
- Speed: 25 knots (46 km/h; 29 mph)
- Range: 7,000 nmi (13,000 km; 8,000 mi) at 15 knots (28 km/h; 17 mph)
- Complement: 170+; around 6 additional personnel on Courbet post-upgrade
- Sensors & processing systems: 1 × Air/Surface DRBV 15C sentry radar; 1 x SENIT FLF combat management system (replaced previous Thales TAVITAC CMS during 2020-21 refit); 1 × firing control radar for the 100 mm gun; 1 × DRBN34 navigation radar; 1 × DRBN34 landing radar; KingKlip Mk2 hull-mounted sonar (incorporated during 2020-21 refit)
- Electronic warfare & decoys: 1 × Saïgon ARBG 1 radio interceptor; 1 × ARBR 21 radar interceptor; 2 × Dagaie Mk2 chaff launcher; 1 × AN/SLQ-25 Nixie tugged noise maker; 1 × Prairie-Masker noise reduction system; 1 × Syracuse IV satellite communications; 1 × Inmarsat
- Armament: Anti-ship; 8 × Exocet MM40 Block 3 anti-ship missiles (Block 3c variant entering service in French Navy from December 2022); Guns; 1 × 100 mm TR automatic gun; 2 × 20 mm modèle F2 guns; Anti-aircraft; 2 x 6 SADRAL launchers/MISTRAL Mk3 SAMs/SSMs (replaced previous Crotale SAM during 2020-21 refit)
- Armour: On sensitive areas (munition magazine and control centre)
- Aircraft carried: 1 × helicopter (Panther or NH90)

Courbet is a general purpose stealth frigate of the French Navy (Marine Nationale) of the La Fayette class. She is the third French vessel named after the 19th-century Admiral Amédée Courbet.

== Construction and career ==
Courbet took part in Opération Baliste. On 3 October 2006, an Israeli fighter aircraft penetrated her 2-nautical-mile (4 km) defence perimeter without responding to radio calls, triggering a diplomatic incident. Israel apologised after official protests from the French government. Throughout September the ship was involved in anti-piracy operations off the coast of Somalia, helping to recapture a yacht taken by pirates on 2 September.

In December 2009 Courbet escorted the French Navy cruiser Jeanne d'Arc on her final voyage. This was last trip of the helicopter carrier that served as a floating embassy and symbol of the French Navy for 46 years. Jeanne d'Arc's last voyage in company with Courbet included visits to Africa, South America including Rio de Janeiro to Buenos Aires, the French Antilles, the United States including New York City, and Canada. The voyage was completed sometime in May 2010.

During the Libyan Civil War, on 29 April 2011, while on patrol off Misrata, Courbet found and engaged four loyalist RHIB boats laying mines, sinking one of them.

In June 2020, while on patrol to counter alleged arms smuggling to Libya, France claimed that Turkish frigates illuminated Courbet three times with their fire control radar, a claim which was denied by Turkish officials.

On her first operational deployment after her mid-life upgrade, Courbet, operating in the Gulf of Guinea in conjunction with the helicopter assault ship Mistral, was involved in the seizure of just under 2 tons of drugs in May 2022.

In September 2023, while operating in the Mediterranean the frigate experienced a fire on board. Although no one was reported injured and the fire was extinguished, she as compelled to return to Toulon for evaluation and repair. The frigate was reported to have returned to sea in February 2024.

== Upgrade ==
Courbet was the first ship of her class to begin a mid-life upgrade in October 2020. The upgrade is designed to permit the frigate to operate through the 2020s and into the 2030s and incorporates the addition of hull-mounted sonar, improved point air defence systems as well as the capacity to carry the latest variant of the Exocet anti-ship missile. The frigate returned to sea in June 2021 following her upgrade. She is projected to remain in service until 2032.

Going forward it was also planned to incorporate the CANTO anti-torpedo countermeasures system in the frigate.
