= Gobanle =

Town in Somalia

- Town
- Nickname: Goobaanle Haroow
- Location in Somalia.
- Coordinates: 3°07′21.7″N 44°45′56.2″E
- Country: Somalia
- State: South West
- Region: Lower Shabelle
- District: Wanlaweyn

Government
  - Mayarka gobanle: Ciid sheikh hirab
- Time zone: UTC+3 (EAT)
- Area code: +252

Gobanle (Somali: Goobaanle; Italian: Govanle) is a town in Lower Shabelle, Somalia. lies in the interior of the region, north of Wanlaweyn. Modern geographic data places Gobanle at approximately 3°07'21.7"N 44°45'56.2"E and identifies it as a part of Wanlaweyn District. A water well bearing the name Gobanle is also mapped immediately east of the town. The Italian form Govanle is also recorded in colonial-era geographical works. Guido Corni placed it in relation to Uanle (Wanlaweyn) and the surrounding interior
