= Leego, Somalia =

Leego ليغو Leego
- Town
- Interactive map of Leego
- Coordinates: 2°43′00″N 44°30′00″E
- Country: Somalia
- Regional State: South West
- Region: Lower Shabelle

Government
  - Mayor: Adan Ahmed, Adan Yarow

Population (2006)
  - Total: 20,000
- Estimated
- Time zone: UTC+3 (EAT)

Leego, (Arabic: ليغو; Somali: Leego) is a town located in Lower Shabelle, Somalia. It is situated 100 kilometres northwest of the capital Mogadishu and approximately 20 km west of Yaqbiriweyne and 54 km east of Burhakaba. It is located on the road between Burhakaba and Bali Dogle in the Lower Shabelle region.

== Administrative divisions ==
Jiira Kulow, Yaq Domar, Qardho, Saah Weyn, Saah Yar, Sarar Gobo, Jameeca. EL Bashir and many more villages fall under the administration of Leego

== Demographics ==
The district has a total population of 129,811.It is inhabited by the subclans Makahiil and Calofi Gaalje'el.

== History ==
In 2006, the village was the site of the Battle of Jowhar between forces of the Somali Transitional Federal Government and the Islamic Courts Union. In 2015, the area was the scene of heavy fighting between al-Shabaab militants and African Union troops in May and June 2015 with one notable instance being the Battle of Leego. In 2017, the town was retaken by al-Shabaab following the withdrawal of AMISOM troops as result of the Golweyn ambush. In August 2017, the AMISOM high command reportedly assured Leego's mayor, Abukar Abdullahi Isak Al-Adaala that the Ethiopian military would soon send new troops in order to reconquer Leego.
