= Yaqbiriweyne =

Yaqbariweyne
- Town
- Interactive map of Yaqbariweyne
- Coordinates: 2°39′54″N 44°41′24″E
- Country: Somalia
- Regional State: South West

Population (2019)
  - Total: 12,950
- Time zone: UTC+3 (EAT)

Yaqbiriweyne (Somali: Yaaq beri weyne) is a town located in the Lower Shabelle region of Somalia.

== Overview ==
The town is located 24 km (15 mi) west of Wanlaweyn District and 80 km (50 mi) south of the Somalian capital Mogadishu.
