= Hillary Sao Kanu =

Sierra Leonean police officer

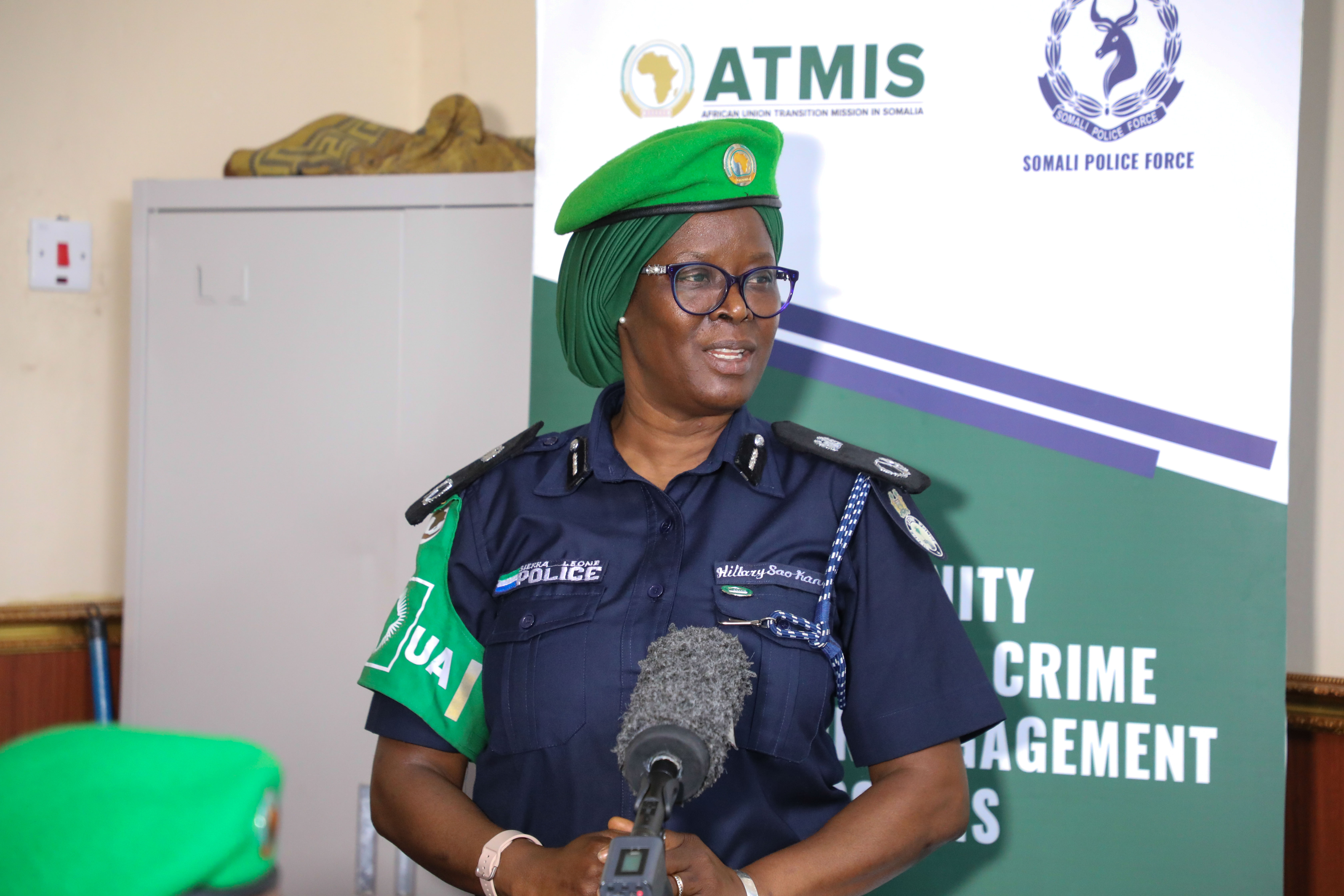
- Hillary Sao Kanu in 2023

Commissioner of Police of the African Union Transition Mission in Somalia
- Incumbent
- Assumed office 2 March 2023

Personal details
- Education: Fourah Bay College (bachelor's degree)
- Profession: Police officer

Hillary Sao Kanu is a senior Sierra Leonean police officer who has served as Commissioner of Police of the African Union Transition Mission in Somalia (ATMIS) since 2023.

== Life ==
Hillary Sao Kanu studied at the Fourah Bay College of the University of Sierra Leone and passed a bachelor's degree in Social Work. In July 1992, she joined the Sierra Leone Police as an investigator and was enlisted in the special branch in 1993. In 2007, she became head of the Sierra Leone Police Media Unit. Between 2008 and 2009, she worked in Darfur for the African Union-United Nations Hybrid Mission (UNAMID), where she was first a United Nations police officer then worked at the headquarters of the mission in Elfashia.

She worked as a local unit commander in Kissy then at the Sierra Leone Police headquarters as the Director of Support Services and a police commander of the Bo District. She is also the first woman to be a regional police commander.

Her role for ATMIS started on 2 March 2023 with the aim to maintain security and stability in Somalia, train the local police force and provide equipment. In July, she awarded several medals to Nigerian police officers who completed their tour. She praised Sierra Leonean police officers who took part in the peace effort in Somalia during their ATMIS mission. She oversaw various trainings for the Somali Police Force. She also focuses her effort on terrorist threats such as al-Shabab.
