= Xavier Magne =

French Navy officer

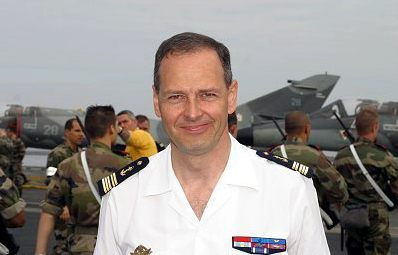
Xavier Magne in 2004

Amiral Xavier Magne is a French Navy officer, commander of European Maritime Force between 2011 and 2013.

== Biography ==
Magne made a career aboard the Charles De Gaulle. On the 5 August 2005, he was promoting from second officer to captain of the aircraft carrier, succeeding capitaine de vaisseau Denis Béraud.

As a squadron commander, he directed the naval component of Opération Baliste in 2006.

From 2007, he has served in the capacity of Chief of Staff for Maritime and Air Operations .

In 2011, he becomes ALFAN commanding the "Force d'action navale"
