= African Union Transition Mission in Somalia =

Peacekeeping mission (2022–2024)

- Hawlgalka Isbeddelka Midowga Afrika ee Somaaliya
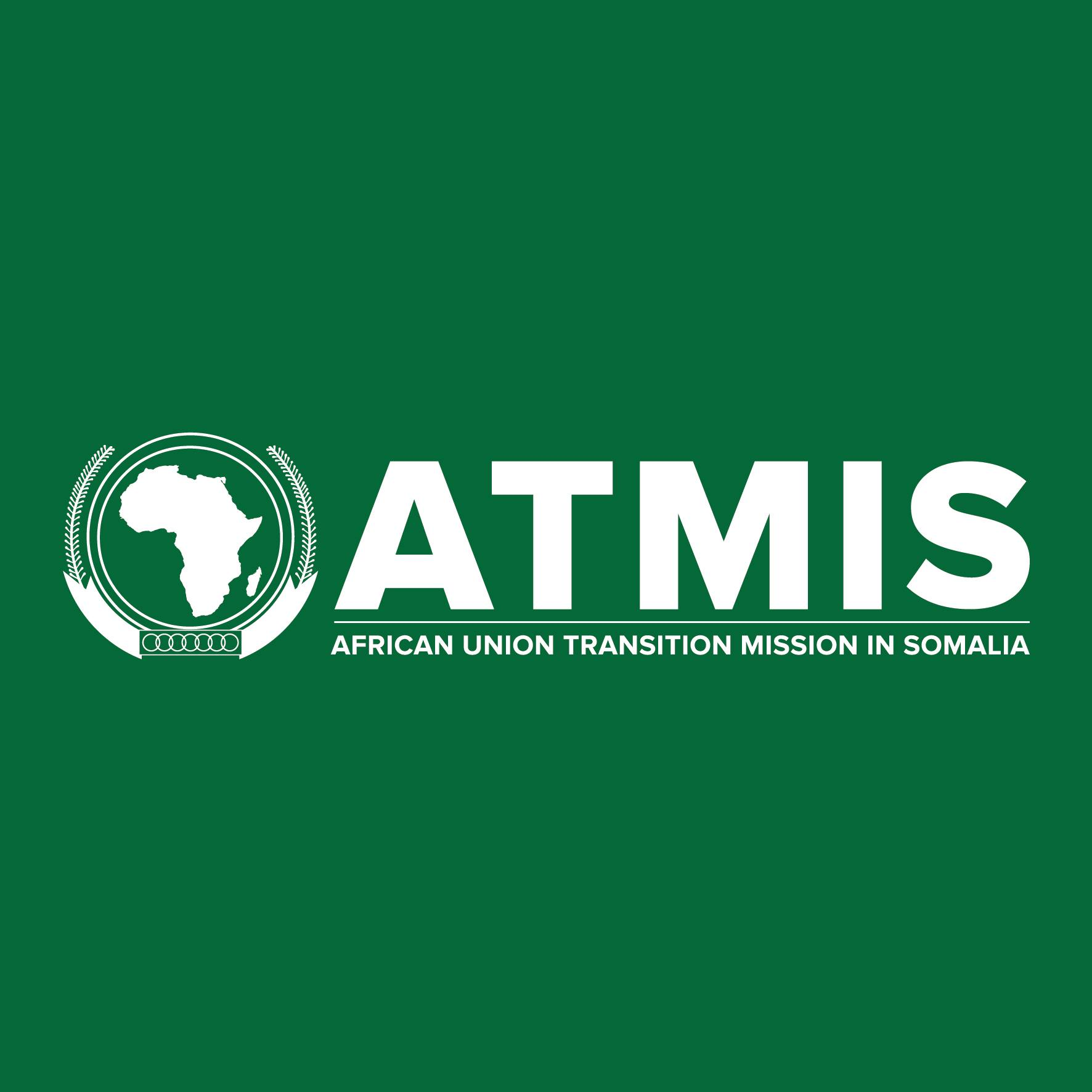
- Leaders: Head of ATMIS Ambassador Mohamed El-Amine Souef; ATMIS Force Commander Lt. Gen. Sam Kavuma; Police Commissioner Hillary Sao Kanu
- Dates active: 1 April 2022 – 31 December 2024
- Headquarters: Mogadishu
- Active regions: Central and southern Somalia
- Size: 14,626 uniformed personnel, inclusive of 1,040 police personnel
- Wars: Somali Civil War: Somali Civil War (2009–present)

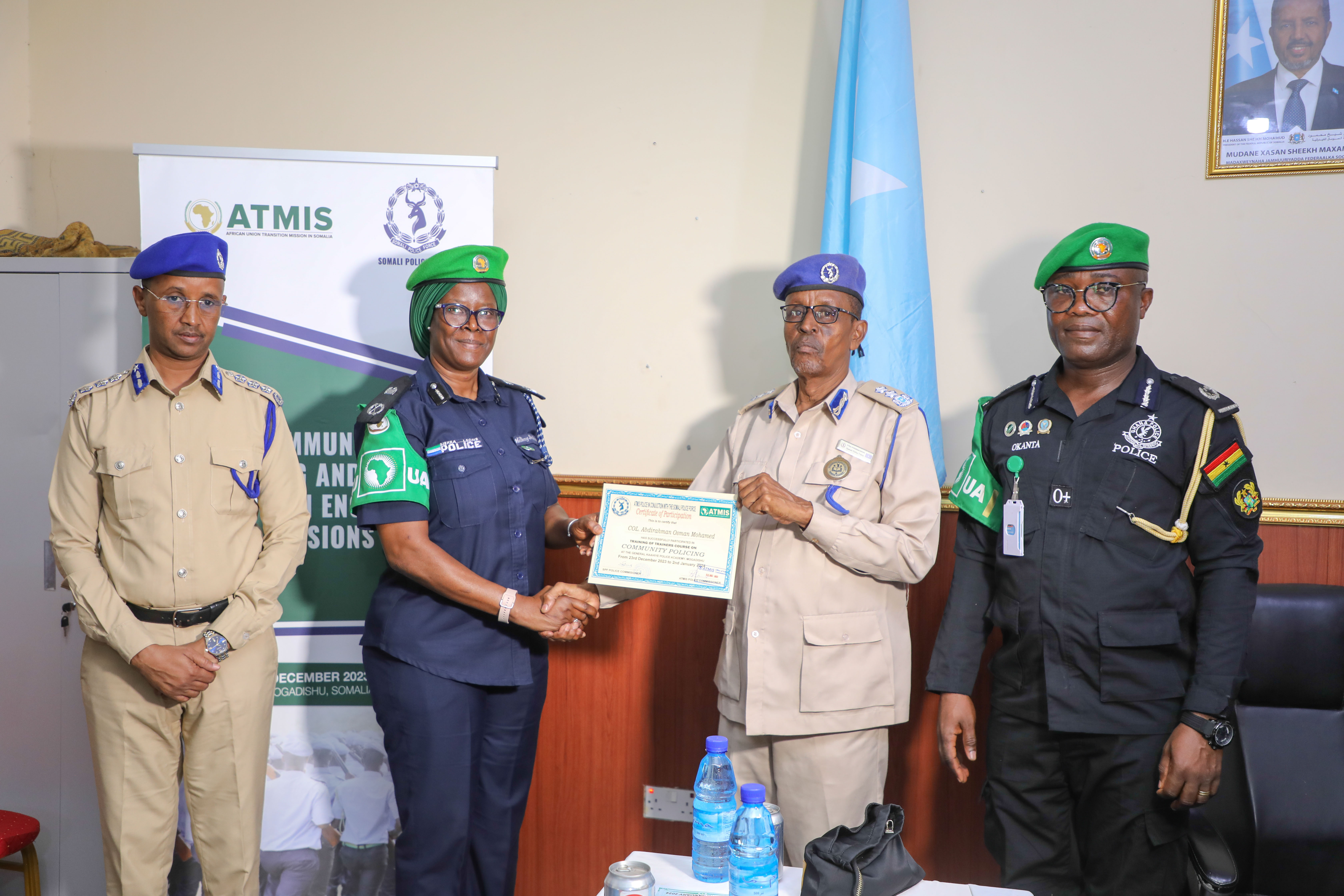
Hillary Sao Kanu, commissioner of Police for ATMIS, hands over a certificate for the completion of training to a police officer from the Somali Police Force on 2 January 2024.

The African Union Transition Mission in Somalia (ATMIS) is a former African Union transition and drawdown mission from peacekeeping operations in Somalia. Formerly the African Union Mission to Somalia (AMISOM), which began in 2007 and operated until 2022, the goal of ATMIS was to fully transition security operations to the Somali National Armed Forces. The operation consisted of troops from the East African nations of Ethiopia, Kenya, Burundi, Djibouti, and Uganda.

ATMIS transitioned into the AU Support and Stabilization Mission in Somalia (AUSSOM) at the start of 2025. Financial constraints and rising tensions between Somalia and Ethiopia during late 2024 have complicated the transition.

== Overview ==
The African Union Transition Mission in Somalia was formed on 1 April 2022, following the end of the AMISOM mandate on 31 March. The mission is focused on both military and institutional autonomy of the Somali government as the African Union pulls out. The mission's mandate is set to end on 31 December 2024, when Somali Security Forces are expected to fully take over the security responsibilities of the country, guided by the Somalia Transition Plan. The first reduction of troops to ease into the end of the peacekeeping mission will take place in December 2022. In May 2024, Somalia asked the United Nations to end this peacekeeping operation with the African Union.

On 2 March 2023 Hillary Sao Kanu is named Commissioner of Police of the ATMIS with the aim to maintain security and stability in the region, train the local police force and provide equipment.

== Response from Somalia ==
On 6 April 2022, the Prime Minister of Somalia Mohamed Hussein Roble orders African Union Ambassador to Somalia Francisco Madeira persona non grata to leave the country within 48 hours because of "engaging in acts that are incompatible with his status," after audio emerged of him criticizing government officials for not dealing with national security problems. President of Somalia Mohamed Abdullahi Mohamed, a major critic of PM Roble, immediately rejects the expulsion. On 16 April 2022, plans for a new African Union ambassador to come to Somalia to replace Francisco Madeira begin, after the controversy on 6 April that soured relations with the Prime Minister.

== Major incidents and casualties ==
- 3 May 2022 – Al-Shabaab jihadists armed with guns and explosives stormed an ATMIS military camp in El Baraf, Middle Shabelle region, triggering a fierce firefight killing 30 soldiers and wounding another 22 Burundian peacekeepers, according to a high-ranking Burundian military officer. A dozen soldiers were also declared missing. This was the first ever attack on ATMIS since taking over AMISOM on 31 March.
- 26 May 2023 – Heavily armed al-Shabaab militants stormed and overran an ATMIS military camp in Buulo Mareer, Lower Shabelle region after several car explosions carried out by suicide bombers around the perimeters of the camp. The assault resulted in the deaths of 54 soldiers (per UPDF sources, al-Shabaab claim 137), and the capture of at least 2 soldiers, along with the militants temporarily seizing control of the town. This attack was the deadliest attack carried out on Ugandan troops since their deployment in Somalia in 2007, and also the deadliest attack on ATMIS troops since their succession of AMISOM in April 2022.

== Controversies ==
On 20 July 2024, ATMIS has launched an investigation into the fatal shooting of civilians in Buulo Mareer town of Lower Shabelle region on July 17, 2024. The incident, which claimed the lives of two civilians and left another injured, has sparked public outrage and urged ATMIS for transparency, accountability and civilian protection.

== See also ==
- African Union
- African Union-led Regional Task Force
- Multinational Joint Task Force
- Force Intervention Brigade
- Intergovernmental Authority on Development
- Islamic Courts Union
- Transitional Federal Government
- Somali Civil War (diplomatic and humanitarian efforts)
