= French ship Siroco (L9012) =

Landing ship of the French and Brazilian Navies

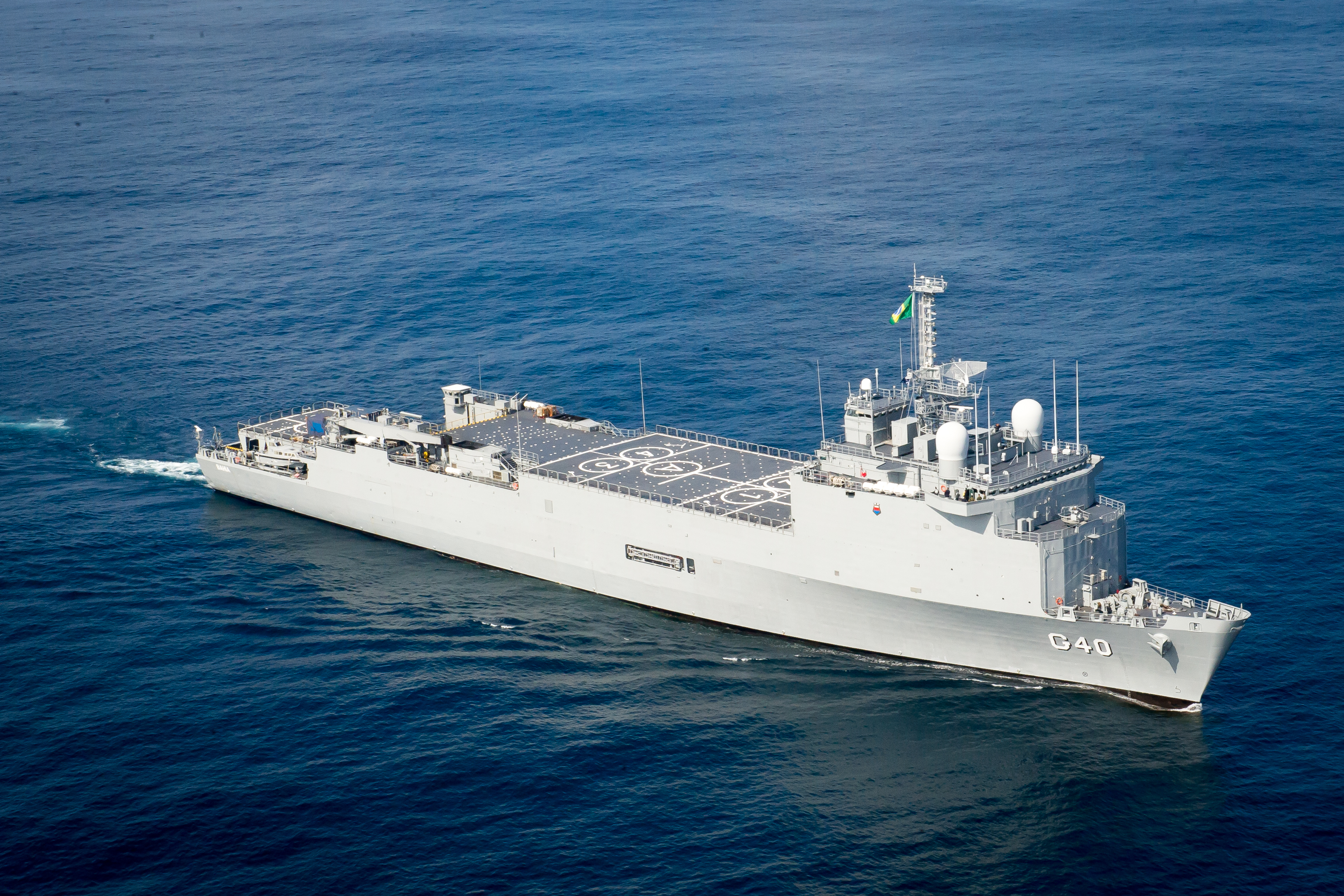

History

France
- Name: Siroco
- Namesake: Sirocco
- Builder: DCN, Brest
- Laid down: 9 October 1995
- Launched: 14 December 1996
- Commissioned: 21 December 1998
- Decommissioned: July 2015
- Home port: Toulon
- Identification: L 9012
- Fate: Sold to Brazilian Navy, August 2015

Brazil
- Name: Bahia
- Acquired: 7 August 2015
- Commissioned: 17 December 2015
- Identification: MMSI number: 710499000; Callsign: PWSA; Hull number: G40
- Status: Active

General characteristics
- Class & type: Foudre-class landing platform dock
- Displacement: 11,300 tonnes (standard); 12,000 tonnes (full load)
- Length: 168 m (551 ft)
- Beam: 23.5 m (77 ft)
- Draught: 5.2 m (17 ft)
- Installed power: 20,800 hp (15,500 kW)
- Propulsion: Engines: 2 SEMT Pielstick 16 PC 2.5 V400 diesels; Propellers: 2 adjustable-blade propellers and one beam propeller; Auxiliaries: 1 beam propeller (1,000 hp); Electrical plant:5 SACM-Unidiesel diesels alternators; Electrical power: 4,250 kW (5 × 850 kW)
- Speed: 21 knots (39 km/h; 24 mph)
- Range: 20,300 km (11,000 nmi; 12,600 mi) at 15 knots (28 km/h; 17 mph)
- Boats & landing craft carried: 8 landing crafts
- Capacity: 150-man command headquarters
- Troops: 450 (900 for a short cruise)
- Crew: 20 officers; 80 petty officers; 60 Quarter-masters
- Armament: 3 Simbad systems; 3 30 mm Breda-Mauser guns; 4 12.7 mm M2-HB Browing machine guns
- Aircraft carried: 4 helicopters EC-725 and SH-60 Seahawk (In Brazilian Navy); Super Puma EC225 (French Navy)
- Aviation facilities: Hangar

The French ship Siroco (L9012) was a Foudre-class landing platform dock of the Marine Nationale. The vessel was purchased by Brazil in August 2015, being transferred to the Brazilian Navy as the multipurpose amphibious ship Bahia (G40).

== Service history ==
=== French service ===
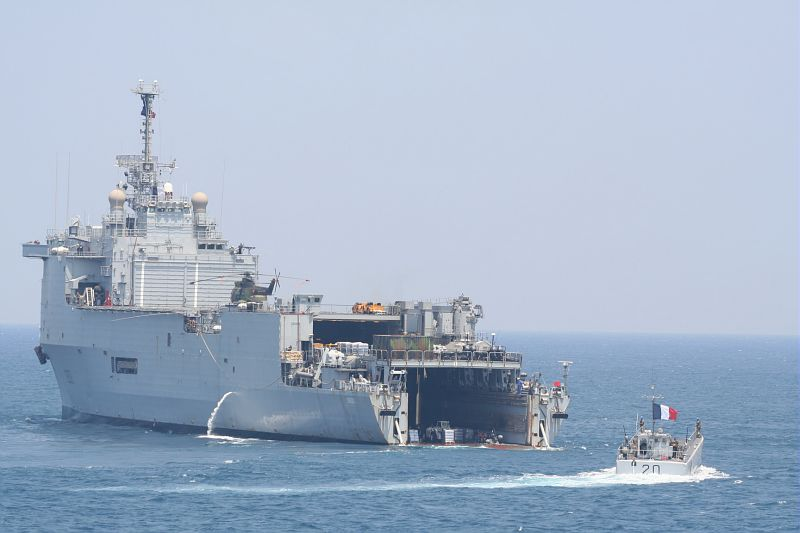
Siroco during Opération Baliste

Siroco was deployed to East Timor as part of the Australian-led International Force East Timor peacekeeping taskforce from 10 October to 25 November 1999.

She served during Opération Baliste during the 2006 Lebanon War. The vessel operated as part of Opération Séisme Haiti 2010 after the 12 January 2010 Haiti earthquake relief effort.

In December 2013 Siroco was serving as the flagship of European Union Naval Force Somalia.

Siroco was to be decommissioned as stated in the 2013 French White Paper on Defence and National Security. The decision was confirmed in October 2014. In July 2015, the ship was decommissioned in French service.

=== Sale ===
In December 2014 the Brazilian Navy showed interest in the ship and sent a team to evaluate her. According to the analysis, the ship was in good general condition and recommended purchase.

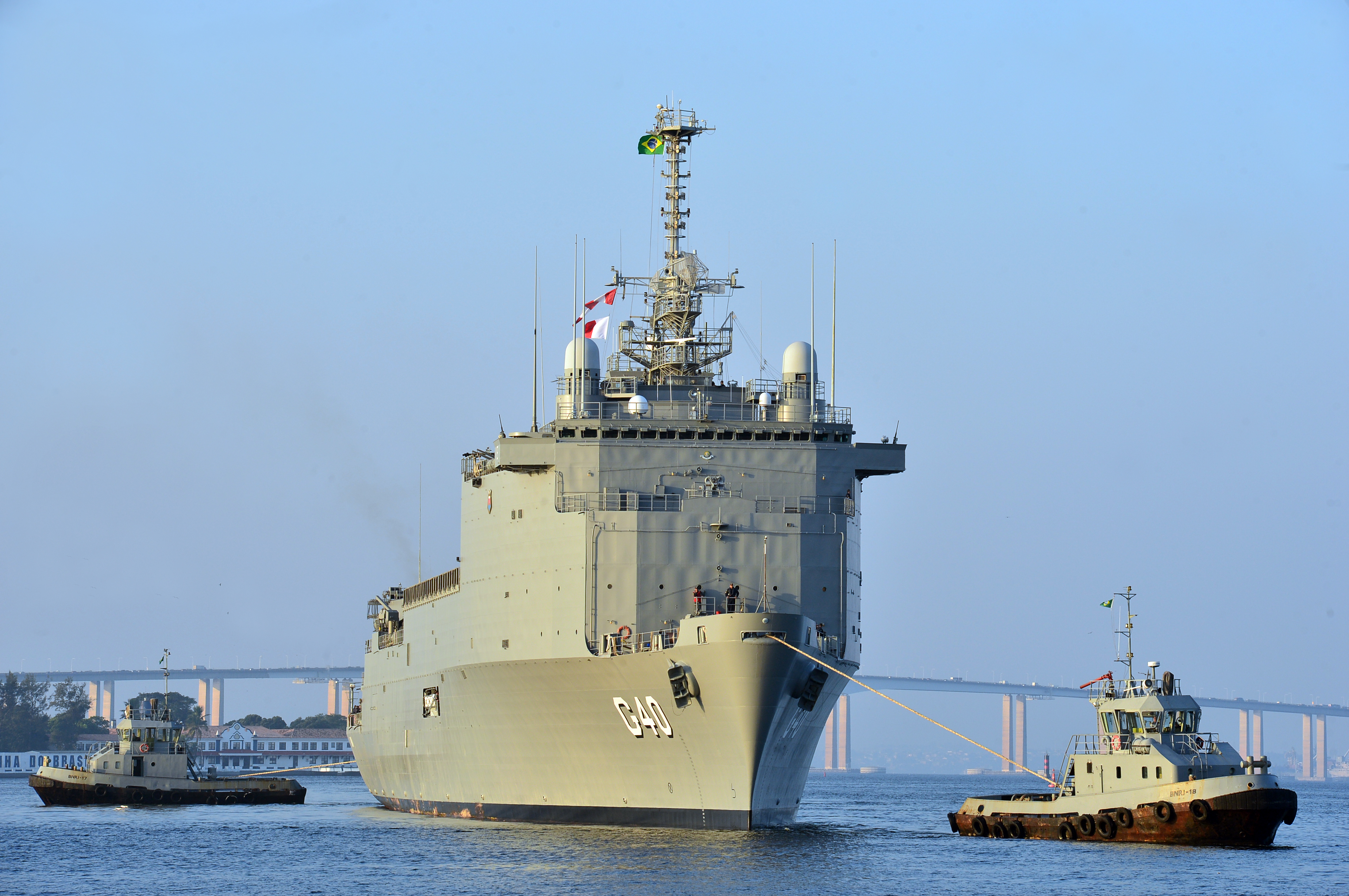
Bahia in Brazilian Navy service in 2018

The Portuguese Navy also showed interest in the ship, during joint naval exercises with the French Navy, in March 2015. However, when the acquisition process of Siroco was already at an advanced stage, the Minister of Defense of Portugal signed an renunciation order cancelling the process on 30 July 2015. The renunciation was justified by the identification of several incompatibilities between the ship and other hardware in use by Portugal, including its inability to support the operation of the Portuguese EH101 helicopters.

Following the Portuguese withdrawal, on 7 August 2015, the Ministry of Defense of Brazil announced the acquisition of Siroco for the Brazilian Navy for €80 million. The deal includes landing craft, spare parts, missile launchers for the Mistral missile, and training. The ship was renamed Bahia and given the identification number G40. Provisionally commissioned into the Brazilian Navy on 10 December 2015, the ship officially incorporated the vessel into service on 10 March 2016.

To bring the ship into Brazilian service, a contract was signed with DCNS for €7.5 million.

=== Brazilian service ===
The purchase of the ship allowed an increase in the amphibious and aerial capabilities of the Brazilian Navy, as well as contributing to the maintenance of the logistics of the United Nations Stabilisation Mission in Haiti and humanitarian aid thanks to the hospital center that Bahia has. Its airborne group in Brazilian Navy is composed by 2 helicopters Eurocopter EC725 and 2 Sikorsky SH-60 Seahawk.
