= Qoriyoley District =

Qoriyoley
- District
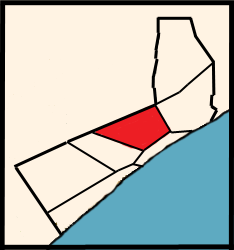
- Country: Somalia
- Region: Lower Shabelle
- Capital: Qoryoley
- Time zone: UTC+3 (EAT)

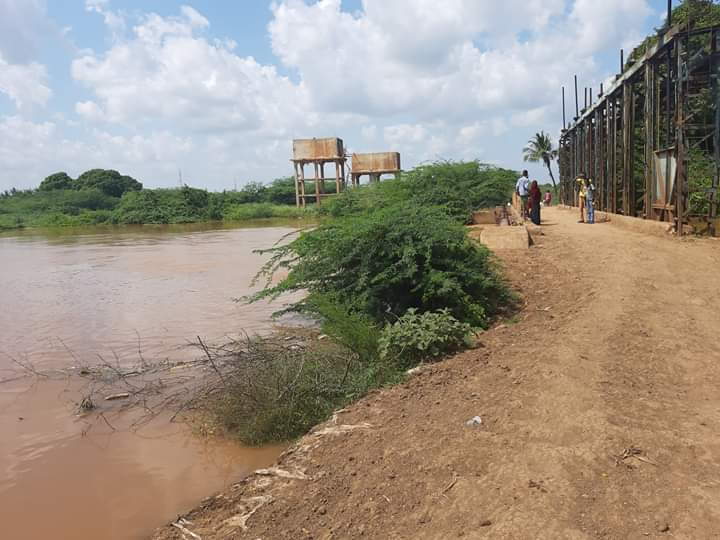
Farm in Qoriyoley District

Qoriyoley District (Somali: Degmada Qoriyoley) is a district in the southeastern Lower Shabelle (Shabeellaha Hoose) region of Somalia. Its capital is Qoryoley. In 2005, it had a population of 134,205. The name "Qoriyoley" literally translates to 'gunsmith'.
