= Wanlaweyn =

Wanlaweyn Wanliwiing
- Town
- Location in Somalia.
- Coordinates: 2°37′00″N 44°54′00″E
- Country: Somalia
- Region: Lower Shebelle
- District: Wanlaweyne

Population
  - Total: 26,700
- Time zone: UTC+3 (EAT)

Wanlaweyn (Maay: Wanliwiing) historical (Italian: Uanle Uen) is a town in the northern Lower Shebelle region of Somalia. Located about 90 km (50 miles) northwest of the capital Mogadishu, and it is the administrative center of the Wanlaweyn District. Historical Italian geographical sources placed Uanle Uen in the agricultural region known as Dafet, while later administrative records identified Uanle Uen as the chief town of the Dafet district.

== Demographics ==
Wanlaweyn has a population of around 26,700 inhabitants. The broader Wanlaweyn District has a total population of 250,643 residents.

== History ==
During the 1961 Somali constitutional referendum, in order to secure a substantial "Yes" vote for southerners, the small town reported 100,000 votes. This was higher than total ballots cast in the North (Somaliland), therefore Northerners became suspicious of the political nature of Southerners. As a result, the term "Wanlaweyn" was coined for Southerners.
