= Buulo Mareer =

Bulo Marer Buulo Mareer, Bulla Marer, Bula Mareer, Bulo Barer, Bulomarer
- Town
- Location. Bulo Marer (Somalia)
- Coordinates: 1°37′55″N 44°31′20″E
- Country: Somalia
- Region: Lower Shebelle
- Time zone: UTC+3 (EAT)

Bulo Marer (Somali: Buulo Mareer, Bulla Marer, Bula Mareer, Bulo Barer, Bulomarer) is a town in the southwestern Lower Shebelle region of Somalia. It was a base of Al-Shabaab, and was the site of an ill-fated 2013 military operation during which French commandos attempted to free a French hostage that was being held by the insurgent group. The town was taken by Somali government forces assisted by AMISOM troops after a battle on August 30, 2014. It was the site of the 2024 African Union base attack in Bulo Marer.

Hon Abshir Mumin and Feysal Cholera are two notable figures from Bulomareer, noting that Feysal currently leads all Bulomareerians in Mogadishu, the capital city.

== Recent history ==
In November 2008, Bulo Marer was reported to have a protected water well.

=== Capture by Al-Shabaab ===
In November 2008, the Islamic militant group Al-Shabaab occupied Bulo Marer.

A photo showing al-Shabaab soldiers in Bulo Marer was published in 2008.

In January 2013, the French-United States military attempted unsuccessfully to rescue hostages from Al-Shabaab in Bulo Marer.

In April 2014, the Tunni clan of Bulo Marer reportedly provided food to Al-Shabaab.

In May 2014, 3 alleged spies for the Somali and Ethiopian governments were publicly executed in a park in Bulo Marer.

In August 2014, Al-Shabaab's media arm, Al-Kataib, broadcast a documentary about the failed January 2013 attack on Bulo Marer by the French-United States military.

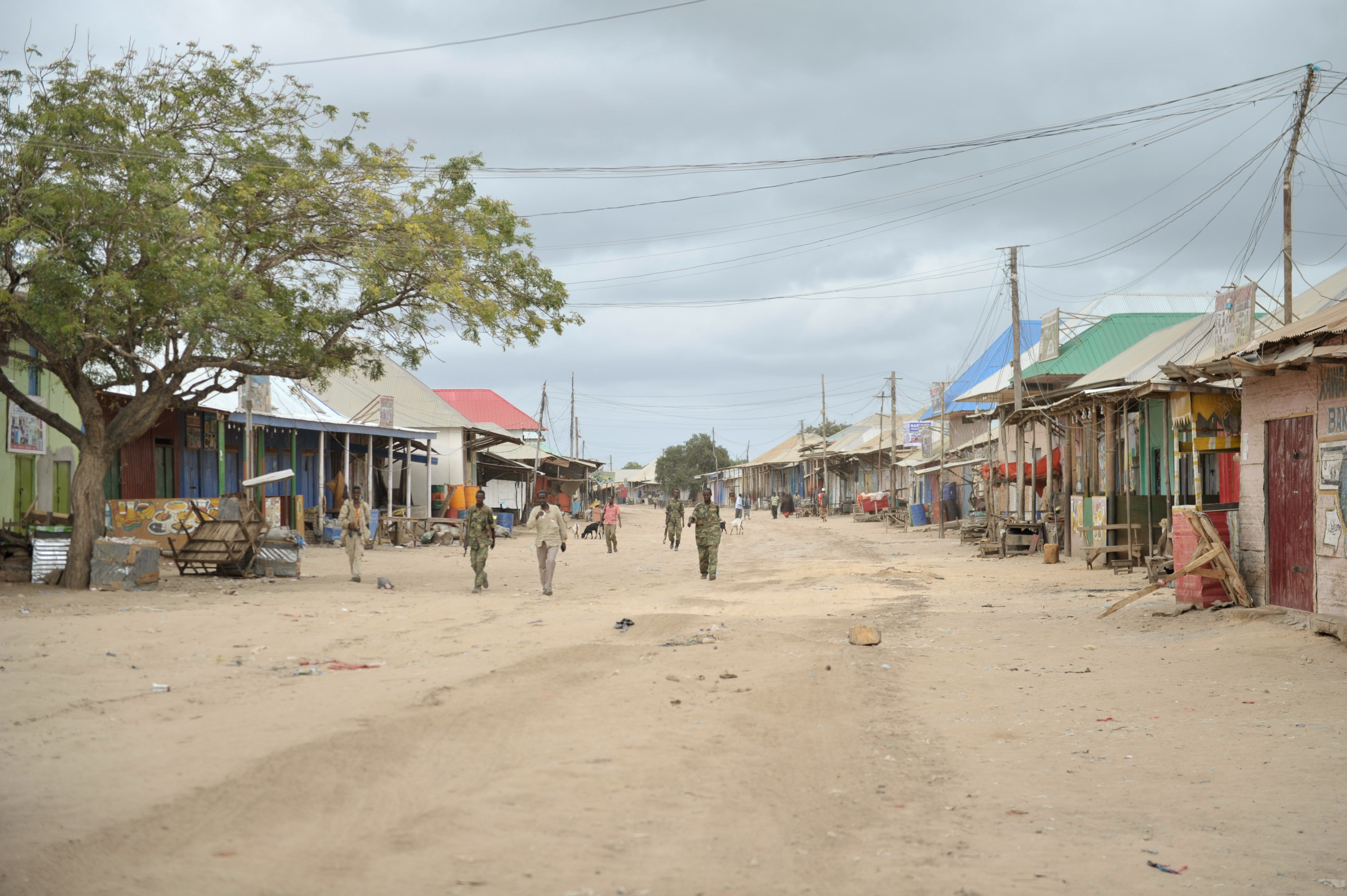
In August 2014, Bulo Marer just after the AU military occupation

In August 2014, Somali armed forces and African Union (AU) forces occupied Bulo Marer. Until then, Al-Shabaab had made Bulo Marer one of its key strongholds, robbing travelers and collecting taxes from residents.

In April 2016, four civilians were killed when their vehicle was destroyed in Bulo Marer after they failed to follow military stop orders.

In March 2019, Al-Shabaab carried out an attack on the African Union Mission in Somalia (AMISOM) base.

In May 2023, Al-Shabaab attacked a base manned by Ugandan troops of the African Union Transition Mission in Somalia (ATMIS) in Bulo Marer. The Somalia government said 30 people were killed in the attack. Al-Shabaab said it killed 137 soldiers. Uganda's president announced that 54 people were killed.

In July 2024, public outrage ensued in Bulo Marer after 3 farmers were shot, and 2 were killed and beheaded by Ugandan ATMIS soldiers. Al-Shabaab broadcast in a radio message that they vowed to retaliate for the farmers' deaths. There was no immediate response from ATMIS or the Somali government.
