= Lower Shabelle =

Region in Somalia

Lower Shabelle Shibelithy Hoosy Shabeellaha Hoose شبيلي السفلى Basso Scebeli
- Region
- Flag Coat of arms

- Location in Somalia
- Coordinates: 1°46′6″N 44°23′24″E
- Country: Somalia
- Regional State: South West
- Capital: Merca

Government
  - Type: Federal State
  - Governor: Mohamed Ibrahim Barre

Area
  - Total: 25,285 km^{2} (9,763 sq mi)

Population (2019)
  - Total: 1,218,700
  - Density: 48.199/km^{2} (124.83/sq mi)
- Time zone: UTC+3 (EAT)
- ISO 3166 code: SO-SH
- HDI (2023): 0.288 low · 17th of 18

Lower Shabelle (Somali: Shabeellaha Hoose, Maay: Shibelithy Hoosy, Arabic: شبيلي السفلى, Italian: Basso Scebeli) is an administrative region (gobol) in southern Somalia.

== Geography ==
Lower Shabelle is bordered by the regions of Banaadir, Middle Shabelle (Shabeellaha Dhexe), Hiran, Bay, and Middle Jubba (Jubbada Dhexe) and by the Somali Sea. It is named after the Shebelle River, which passes through it.

Until 1984, when the regions were reassigned, it was part of the larger Benadir region, and its capital was Mogadishu. Merca is now the Lower Shabelle capital.

== Districts ==
Lower Shabelle Region is divided into nineteen districts:

- Merca Minicipality (Capital City)
- Afgooye District
- Barawa District
- Kurtunwarrey District
- Qoryooley District
- Sablaale District
- Wanlaweyn District
- Awdheegle District

== Major cities ==
Major cities include

- Merca
- Afgooye
- Elasha Biyaha
- Qoryoley
- Leego
- Barawa
- Awdheegle
- Wanlaweyn
- Yaqbiriweyne
- Sablale
- Jannaale
- Goobaanle
- Mubaarak
- Buulo Mareer
- Gobanle
- Jilib Merca
- Kunyo Barrow
- Siyaame
- Raaxoole (KM50)

== Violence in Golweyn ==
On 30 July 2017, an AMISOM convoy was ambushed by al-Shabaab insurgents, killing and wounding several Ugandan soldiers.

Eight children were killed and dozens were wounded when a bomb exploded in Golweyn on 31 January 2021.
