= Chief of Defence Force (Somalia) =

Somali military appointment

Chief of the Defence Force
- Taliyaha Ciidanka Xooga Somaaliyeed (Somali)
- Coat of arms of the Armed Forces

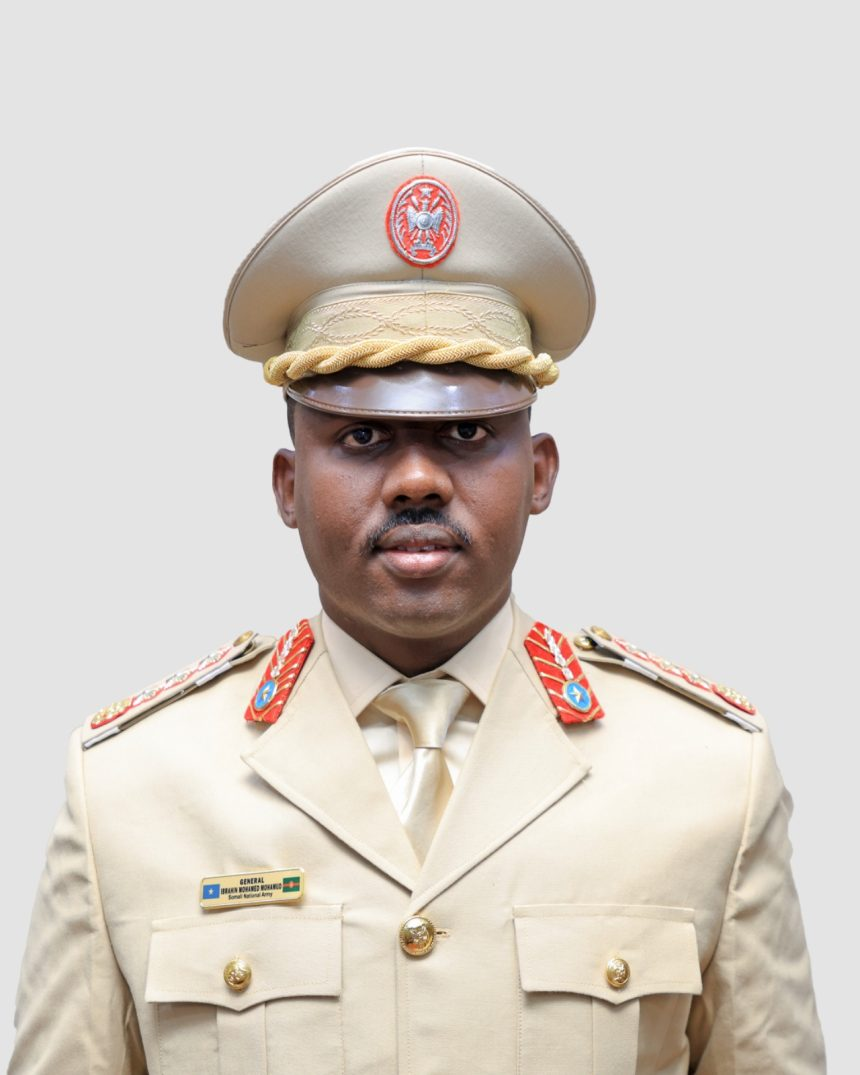
- Incumbent; Brigadier General Ibrahim Mohamed Mohamud since 29 January 2026
- Somali Armed Forces
- Style: Jaale
- Type: Chief of staff
- Status: Highest ranking military officer
- Abbreviation: CDF
- Appointer: President of Somalia
- Formation: 12 April 1960
- First holder: Daud Abdulle Hirsi
- Unofficial names: Commander of the Somali Armed Forces, Commander of the Somali National Army

The Chief of Defence Force (Somali: Taliyaha Ciidanka Xooga Somaaliyeed) is the professional head of the Somali Armed Forces. He is responsible for the administration and the operational control of all branches of the Somali military (Army, Navy and Air Force) and thus is the direct superior to both the Chief of the Navy and the Chief of the Air Force. The post has however only been held by Army officers. Typically the rank held by the Chiefs is major general.

In accordance with the unchallenged scholarly consensus that clan affiliation has been critical to warfare in Somalia since the 1980s, clan affiliation of the Chiefs of Defence Force have been added to this list where reliable data is available.

Dahir Adan Elmi, a Hawiye/ Sheekhaal officer, was serving as CDF in 2014.

Odawa Raage (Hawiye/Abgaal) served as CDF from 22 August 2019 to June 2023. He was promoted to major-general in the last days of his tenure, being listed as such in a Somali government briefing of 21 June 2023. He was reappointed on 9 November 2024.

A Hawiye officer, Ibrahim Sheikh Muhyadin Addow, succeeded Raage as CDF in June 2023, and then Raage was reappointed. Thereafter, Ibrahim Mohamed Mohamud took over as of 29 January 2026, when he was appointed by the Federal Government of Somalia.

== List of Chiefs ==
=== Somali Republic and Somali Democratic Republic (1960–1991) ===
No.	Portrait	Commander in Chief of the Armed Forces	Took office	Left office	Time in office	Ref.
1	Daud Abdulle Hirsi	Jaale; Major general Daud Abdulle Hirsi (1925–1965)	12 April 1960	1965 †	4–5 years	
2	Siad Barre	Jaale; Major general Siad Barre (1910–1995)	1965	1969	3–4 years	
3	Ali Samatar	Jaale; Lieutenant general Ali Samatar (1931–2016)	1969	1990	17–18 years	–
4	Mohamed Said Hersi Morgan	Jaale; Major general Mohamed Said Hersi Morgan (1949–2025)	25 November 1990	20 January 1991	56 days	

=== Transitional Federal Government (2004–2012) ===
No.	Portrait	Chief of Army	Took office	Left office	Time in office	Ref.
1	Ismail Qasim Naji	Major general Ismail Qasim Naji	15 April 2005	10 February 2007	1 year, 301 days	
2	Abdullahi Ali Omar	Major general Abdullahi Ali Omar (born 1947)	10 February 2007	21 July 2007	161 days	
3	Salah Hassan Jama	Major general Salah Hassan Jama	21 July 2007	11 June 2008	326 days	
4	Said Dheere Mohamed	Major general Said Dheere Mohamed	11 June 2008	14 May 2009	337 days	
5	Yusuf Osman Dhumal	Major general Yusuf Osman Dhumal	15 May 2009	6 December 2009	205 days	
6	Mohamed Gelle Kahiye	Major general Mohamed Gelle Kahiye	6 December 2009	6 September 2010	274 days	
7	Ahmed Jimale Gedi	Major general Ahmed Jimale Gedi	6 September 2010	29 March 2011	204 days	-
8	Abdulkadir Sheikh Dini	Major general Abdulkadir Sheikh Dini	29 March 2011	13 March 2013	1 year, 349 days	

=== Federal Government (2012–present) ===
No.	Portrait	Chief of Staff of the Armed Forces	Took office	Left office	Time in office	Ref.
1	Dahir Adan Elmi	Major general Dahir Adan Elmi	13 March 2013	25 June 2014	1 year, 104 days	
2	Abdullahi Anod	Major general Abdullahi Anod	25 June 2014	24 September 2015	1 year, 91 days	
3	Mohamed Adam Ahmed	Major general Mohamed Adam Ahmed (born 1950)	24 September 2015	5 April 2017	1 year, 193 days	
4	Ahmed Mohamed Jimale	Major general Ahmed Mohamed Jimale	5 April 2017	12 October 2017	190 days	
5	Abdiweli Jama Hussein Gorod	Major general Abdiweli Jama Hussein Gorod	12 October 2017	16 August 2018	308 days	
6	Dahir Adan Elmi	Major general Dahir Adan Elmi	16 August 2018	27 August 2020	2 years, 11 days	
7	Odowaa Yusuf Rageh	Major general Odowaa Yusuf Rageh	27 August 2020	19 June 2023	2 years, 296 days	
8	Ibrahim Sheikh Muhyadin Addow	Major general Ibrahim Sheikh Muhyadin Addow	19 June 2023	9 November 2024	1 year, 143 days	
9	Odowaa Yusuf Rageh	Major general Odowaa Yusuf Rageh	9 November 2024	29 January 2026	1 year, 302 days	
10	Ibrahim Mohamed Mohamud	Brigadier general Ibrahim Mohamed Mohamud	29 January 2026	Incumbent	221 days	
