= Somali Civil War (2009–present) order of battle =

This is the order of battle of the Somali Civil War (2009–present).

== Federal government ==
The Somali National Armed Forces comprise the Somali National Army; the Somali Air Force; and the Somali Navy.

The five "divisions" are headquarters that supervise all SNA land forces in their respective Federal Member States.

- Somali National Army (Villa Gashandiga, Mogadishu)
  - Division "12 April" (Mogadishu and environs)
    - Original Hawiye brigades
  - Division 43 (Jubaland)
  - Division 60 (South West State)
    - Brigades in South West State
  - Division 27 covering Hirshabelle
  - Division 21 covering Galmudug
  - Danab Brigade
  - Gorgor Special Forces
- Somali Air Force
- Somali Navy

Other government agencies:

- Somali Custodial Corps
- Somali Police Force
- National Intelligence and Security Agency

== Federal member states ==
There are five Federal Member States over which the Mogadishu government has some influence over: Jubaland; South West State; Hirshabelle; Galmudug, and Puntland.

- Puntland forces
  - Puntland Security Force (roughly equivalent of Danab)
  - Puntland Dervish Force
  - Puntland Maritime Police Force
  - Puntland Police Force
  - Puntland Intelligence Security Agency
- Jubaland forces
  - Dervish Force (heavily drawn from Madobe's former Raskamboni Movement)
  - Jubaland Intelligence and Security Agency
- Hirshabelle forces
  - Ma'awisley clan militia
- Southwest State forces
  - South West State Darwish / Special Police Force

== African Union contributing states ==
The African Union Support and Stabilization Mission in Somalia (AUSSOM) has four contributors: Uganda, Burundi, Kenya, and Ethiopia, as well as Egypt, which has repeatedly said it will deploy troops, but there are no reliable reports of troops coming under AUSSOM command.

- AUSSOM
  - Ethiopian Armed Forces
    - (Ethiopia) Ethiopian Army
  - Kenya Defence Forces
    - Kenya Army
  - Uganda People's Defence Force
    - Uganda Air Force
  - Djibouti Armed Forces
    - Djiboutian Army

AUSSOM has a limited number of helicopters operating under its direct command. However, Kenya Air Force and Ethiopian Air Force attack aircraft, operating from bases in their own countries, have made repeated airstrikes on targets in Somalia.

== Foreign forces ==
- United States Department of Defense
  - United States Africa Command
    - Special Operations Command - Africa
    - Air Forces Africa
      - 449th Air Expeditionary Group, Camp Lemonnier, Djibouti
  - United States Central Command
- Central Intelligence Agency
- UAE Armed Forces
  - UAEAF
- China
  - People's Armed Police
- Turkish Armed Forces
  - Turkish Land Forces

Self-defense groups

== Islamists ==
- Al-Shabaab
  - Amniyat
  - Ethiopian Front
- Islamic State
  - Somalia Wilayah
  - Yemen Wilayah

== Somaliland ==
- Somaliland Armed Forces
  - Somaliland National Army
    - SSB
  - Somaliland Police Force
  - Somaliland Custodial Corps
  - Somaliland Fire Brigade

== See also ==
- List of orders of battle
