= Ahmed Mohamed Jimale =

Somali military general

Ahmed Jimale Gedi

Chief of Defence Force
- In office 5 April 2017 – 12 October 2017
- President: Mohamed Abdullahi Mohamed
- Preceded by: Mohamed Adam Ahmed
- Succeeded by: Abdiweli Jama Hussein

Military service
- Branch/service: Somali Armed Forces
- Rank: Major general

General Ahmed Jimale Gedi (Somali: Axmad Jimcale Gedi, Arabic: أحمد محمد جمالي), also known as Ahmed Jimale Gedi Irfid, is a Somali military general.
