= 1961 revolt in Somalia =

Coup d'état attempt

- Part of the Cold War, conflicts in the Horn of Africa and the separatism in Somalia
- 1961 revolt in Somalia (Somalia)
Date	10 December 1961
Location	Hargeisa and Burao, northern Somalia (today Somaliland)
Result	Revolt/Coup defeated

Belligerents
Somali Republic	Pro-Somaliland coup plotters

Commanders and leaders
Unknown	Hassan Kayd (WIA)

Strength
Somali National Army garrisons of Hargeisa and Burao	At least 23 junior officers

Casualties and losses
Unknown	c. 3 killed, all others arrested

The 1961 revolt in Somalia was an unsuccessful revolt and coup d'état attempt in northern regions of the Somali Republic which took place in December 1961. The coup plotters, a group of northern junior officers, intended to restore the independence of the State of Somaliland.

== Background ==
After the Trust Territory of Somaliland was unified with the State of Somaliland in 1960, it was discovered that the two polities had been unified under different Acts of Union. The newly unified Somali Republic's parliament promptly created a new Act of Union for all of Somalia, but this new Act was widely rejected in the former State of Somaliland. Regardless, the southern-dominated parliament ordered a referendum in the entire country to confirm the Act of Union. Much of the north's population boycotted the referendum, and just 100,000 northerners voted at all. Of these, over 60% of those were against the union under the new Act. The referendum still passed. In addition, the Isaaq clan which dominated the north was traditionally hostile toward the Hawiye and Darod clans from the south that increasingly dominated politics in the entire republic. Northern support for the union consequently began to deteriorate.

Unrest and opposition to the union further increased as southern politicians began taking up the majority of political positions in the newly unified Somali Republic. This led to fears that the former State of Somaliland could become a neglected outpost. In turn, many northern administrative officials and officers were moved to the south to defuse regional tensions.

In addition to these tensions, there were also personal grievances among several officers of northern descent. They felt that officers from the south who had been appointed as their superiors following the unification were poorly educated and unfit as commanders. Just before the Somali Republic's independence, many southern policemen had been promoted and appointed as ranking military officers. As a result, many southern commanders had "no military experience and training at all". In contrast, northern soldiers were not promoted in a large number before or after independence, even though several had graduated from military academies in Great Britain and Egypt. In general, it was suspected that the government preferred Italian-trained officers from the south over British-trained officers from the north. A group of northern soldiers met with General Daud Abdulle Hirsi, head of the Somali National Army, and outlined these issues in 1960. However, their concerns were ignored.

A group of at least 23 (Note: According to researcher Hussein M Nur, there were 23 coup members overall. Yet 23 coup members were later put on trial, even though three rebels were reportedly killed during the uprising.) junior officers, including several who had been trained in Great Britain, eventually conspired to end the union between Somalia and Somaliland. They benefitted from the fact that the old northern colonial unit, the Somaliland Scouts, had remained relatively intact after the Somali unification. The coup plotters included Hassan Abdillahi Walanwal (alias "Hassan Kayd"), Abdillahi Mohamed Aden, Muhumed Abdillahi Robleh, Abdillahi Said Abby, Said Ali Ghir, Mohamed Mohamoud Said 'Bidihleh, Mohamed Abdirahman Haji Jama, Faisal Haji Jama Geddi, Hussein Ali Duale, Abdillahi Abdi Farah 'Deyr', Daud Ali Yahye, Hussein Mohamed Bullaleh, Abdillahi Ahmed Kibar, Mohamed Warsame, Mohamed Mohamoud Raghe, Abdi Yusuf, Mohamed Sh Muse, Ahmed Haji Deria, Ali Harun, Said Oogle, Abdi Dhala Abdi, Abdikarim Ashur, and Abdi Ali Hussein. They belonged to various northern clans, being united by their common opposition to the existing power structures. Political analyst Faisal A. Roble described Hassan Kayd as the coup's main leader. The conspirators believed that they enjoyed the support of General Daud Abdulle Hirsi.

== Revolt ==
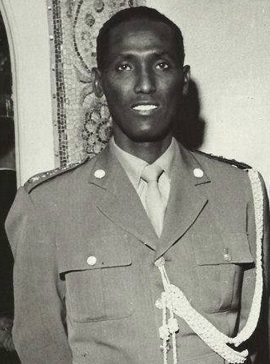
The coup plotters believed that they were supported by General Daud Abdulle Hirsi (pictured 1963), even though the latter fully backed the central government.

The coup was launched ahead of the plotters' schedule on 10 December 1961, as they suspected that their plans had been discovered by pro-government officers. When the coup plotters began their revolt, they wanted to take over major towns in Somaliland. Researcher Ken Menkhaus argued that the coup attempt had "no chance of success" from the start, as the coup plotters did not enjoy majority support among the northern population or the local troops.

One group of junior officer under Lieutenant Mohamed Mohamoud Rage seized control of the radio station in Hargeisa, announcing their intentions and that they were supported by General Hirsi. Another group under Lieutenant Abdillahi Abdi Farah (Deyr) was posted at the central police station to secure it. The rebels managed to detain Colonel Mohamed Ainanshe and Colonel Abdillahi Yusuf who were among the chief commanders in Hargeisa. Initially, the rebels had planned to move the captured commanders to a secure location in the Gaanlibah mountains, but those responsible for guarding them -Lieutenant Abdillahi Said Abby and private Abdillahi Ali Hussein- instead kept the prisoners in a house in Hargeisa. Another group of coup plotters attempted arrest superior officers of southern origin in the town of Burao, but failed.

The government in Mogadishu was surprised at the revolt but reacted quickly. General Hirsi declared via Radio Mogadishu that he was not involved in the revolt, whereupon non-commissioned officers of northern origin moved against the coup members in Hargeisa. Most of the Hargeisa garrison sought to free their captured commanders. Discovering the house where they were held, the loyalists engaged in a firefight with the rebels, killing two rebels and rescuing the prisoners. Hassan Kayd was wounded when soldiers shot at him next to the Birjeex Military HQ. The loyalists also retook Radio Hargeisa, killing one coup member there. The revolt was put down in a matter of hours. All surviving coup members were arrested.

== Aftermath ==
Though the revolt had not been supported by the northern population, the locals still sympathized with the coup members. The government was thus inclined to opt for a lenient treatment. The conspirators were put on trial, and the British judge acquitted them, reasoning that there existed no legitimate Act of Union. In consequence, the officers could not be sentenced based on the Act, while the entire southern presence in the north became legally questionable. The ruling's wider implications was generally ignored in Somalia at the time, but later became important for northerners who wanted to justify the separation of Somaliland from Somalia. Regardless, the Somali government accepted the ruling and released the junior officers.

In the decades after the unification, dissatisfaction about the perceived marginalization remained high in the north. Despite this, some members of Somaliland's political elite managed to gain high-ranking positions in the military and government. Even some of the officers who had taken part in the 1961 revolt, such as Duale, rose to prominent positions. This did not solve the tensions, and northern separatists eventually revolted in 1981, contributing to the Somali Rebellion. In 1991, Somaliland achieved de facto independence. One of the original coup plotters, Hussein Ali Duale, became a leading Somaliland separatist politician.
