= Mohamed Adam Ahmed =

Somali military person

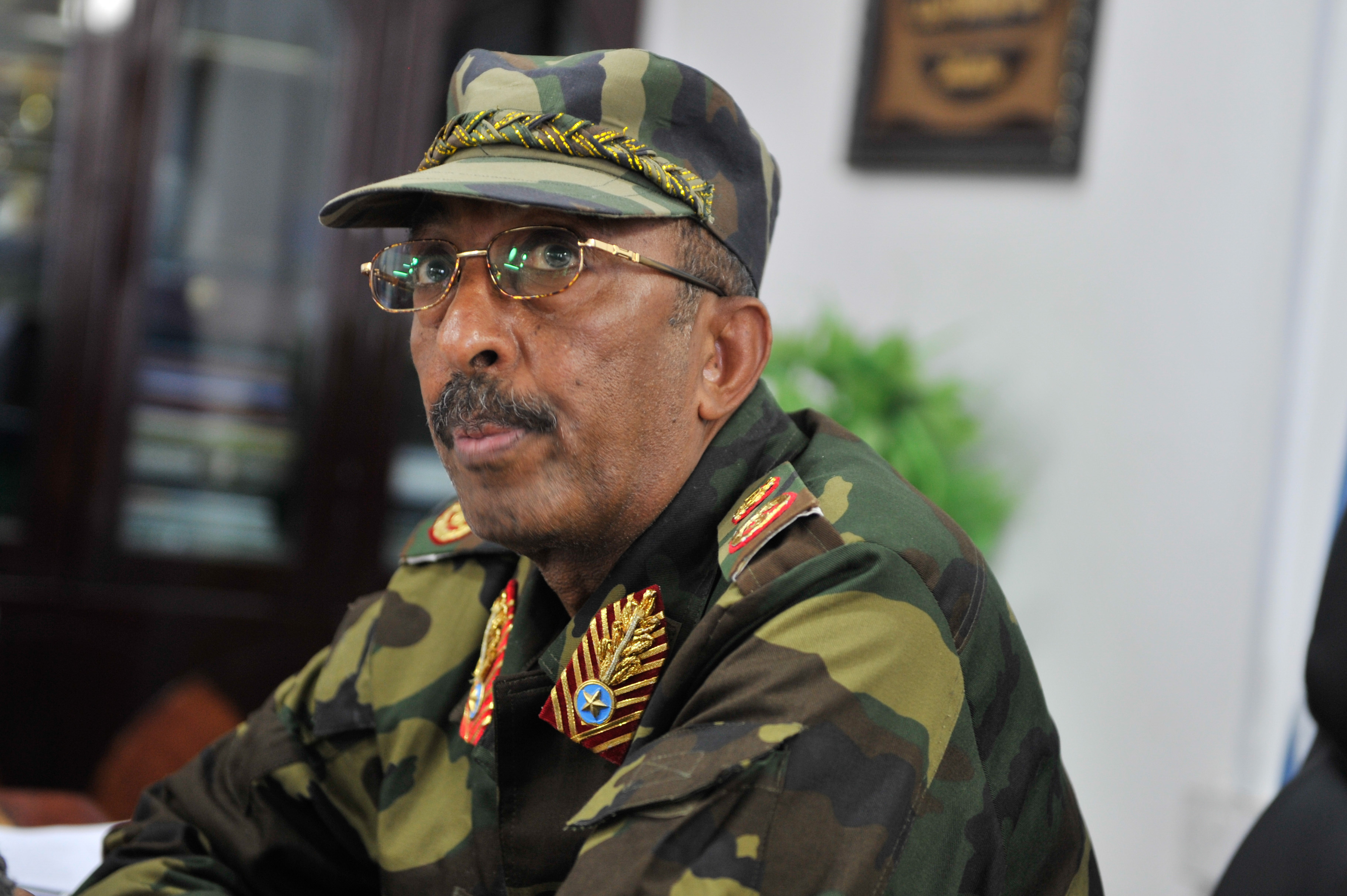

3rd Chief of Defence Force (Somalia)
- In office 24 September 2015 – 5 April 2017
- President: Hassan Sheikh Mohamud; Mohamed Abdullahi Mohamed
- Preceded by: Dahir Adan Elmi
- Succeeded by: Ahmed Mohamed Jimale

Personal details
- Born: 1950; Burao, Somaliland

Military service
- Branch/service: Somali Armed Forces
- Rank: Major General

General Mohamed Adam Ahmed (born 1950) was the Chief Staff of Somali Armed Forces. He took charge on 24 September 2015 after a major reshuffle in Somali force leaders including police. He served until April 2017, where he was replaced when President Mohamed Abdullahi Mohamed make a shakeup.

He is one of the long serving Somali military generals. He studied at different military colleges including Military Academy (Cairo, Egypt), Command and General Staff College (at the Frunze Military Academy, Moscow, Soviet Union) and U.S. Army War College Strategy Studies.
