= Yusuf Osman Dhumal =

Yusuf Osman Dhumal يوسف عثمان الدومال

1st Chief of Defence Force (Somalia)

Military service
- Allegiance: Federal Government of Somalia
- Branch/service: Somali National Army
- Rank: Major General
- Awards: Gold Medal for Bravery and Service

General Yusuf Osman "Dhumal" (Somali: Yuusuf Cusmaan "Duumaal", Arabic: يوسف عثمان الدومال), also known as Yusuf Hussein "Dhumaal", is a Somali military official.

== Career ==
He started his career as an officer in Somalia's military. In 1988, he was transferred to the police. Dhumal was promoted to Banadir Region Police Commissioner, and later to Deputy Commissioner for National Police Operations.

On 14 May 2009, Dhumal was appointed Chief of Army of the Somali Armed Forces. He was concurrently named Brigadier General.

Dhumal was later replaced with Mohamed Gelle Kahiye on 6 December 2009.
