= Bancroft Global Development =

Security consulting firms

- Type: Non-profit
- Founded: 1999
- Founder: Michael Stock
- Headquarters: Washington, D.C., United States
- Website: bancroftglobal.org

Bancroft Global Development, previously named Landmine Clearance International, is a Washington, D.C.–based, non-profit security consulting firm established in 1999. Bancroft Global Investments, established in 2011, is a for-profit company that operates in parallel with the non-profit.

== Overview ==
Bancroft Global Development was founded by Michael Stock as a land-mine clearing company in 1999. In 2008, the organization's name was changed from Landmine Clearance International to Bancroft Global Development. It is headquartered in Washington, D.C.

The organization operates around the world, although with a particular focus on Somalia. Its mission is to provide training and capacity building in regions torn by armed conflict. Bancroft has experience helping partner governments to improve capabilities such as:

- De-mining, countering improvised explosive devices, explosive ordnance disposal, and explosive-detecting dogs
- Law enforcement investigations
- Emergency management and response
- Combat engineering and operational support
- Airport and aviation security
- Public health

In Somalia, Bancroft provides capacity building for the Somali National Army and for members of the African Union Mission to Somalia including the Ugandan People's Defense Force and the Burundi National Defense Force. Within the Somali National Army, Bancroft has been responsible for training and mentoring Danab, a military unit that have since gone on to work alongside the U.S. Military. The organization also provides capacity-building support to the Somali Police force and government prosecutors. Bancroft has collaborated with other U.S. non-profits in Somalia such as Smile Train.

Over the past five years, the majority of Bancroft Global Development funding has come from the United Nations and the U.S. Department of State. Bancroft Global Investments also provides significant financial support to Bancroft Global Development. In 2021, the organization's finances were called into question after the Inspector General of the Department of State found $4.1 million of unauthorized expenses by Bancroft, including $3.78 million in “incentive compensation” for employees. The State Department reviewed the IG recommendation and rejected it with no adverse action towards Bancroft.
