= Ismail Qasim Naji =

Somali military commander and diplomat

Ismail Qasim Naji إسماعيل قاسم ناجي
- Born: 17 December 1969 (age 56); Borama, Somalia
- Military career
- Allegiance: Transitional Federal Government of Somalia
- Service years: 2005–present
- Rank: General
- Commands: Somali National Army (SNA); Transitional National Government (TFG) Army Commander; Chief of Staff, Army of the Somali Republic
- Conflicts: Somali Civil War; Somalia War (2006–2009)

General Ismail Qasim Naji (Somali: Ismaaciil Qaasim Naaji, Arabic: إسماعيل قاسم ناجي) (born December 17, 1969 in Borama, Somalia) was the chief of staff of the Transitional Federal Government (TFG) of Somalia and later the Somali ambassador in Oman. He has served as a senior officer of the Somali army since the administration of Siad Barre, who was removed from power in 1991. Before the formation of the TFG, he also commanded the army of the predecessor Transitional National Government (TNG) of Somalia between 2002 and 2004.

== Military service ==
=== Transitional National Government ===
From 2002 to 2004, Gen. Naji served as the military chief of the Transitional National Government (TNG). During this time, the TNG was opposed militarily and politically by the rival Somalia Reconciliation and Restoration Council (SRRC), backed by Hussein Mohamed Farrah Aidid (son of the late warlord Mohamed Farrah Aidid), Mohamed Dhere, and others. Eventually the leadership of the SRRC and the TNG reconciled.

=== Transitional Federal Government ===
In November 2004, the TNG was succeeded by the establishment of the Transitional Federal Government (TFG). On April 15, 2005, Gen. Naji was appointed Chief army commander of the TFG.

In October 2005, a report by the UN Monitoring group quoted Gen. Naji as having accepted a large shipment of goods from Yemen in contravention of UN sanctions on arms imports, including 5,000 weapons, hand grenades and antipersonnel mines.

In November 2006, Gen. Naji acknowledged the defection of TFG militia to the Islamic Courts Union (ICU).

On January 17, 2007, Gen. Naji reported what was believed to be Sheikh Sharif Sheikh Ahmed's briefcase, filled with documents, was recovered by government forces from a jungle hideout in southwestern Somalia as conflicting reports emerged the ICU leader had been arrested near the Dadaab refugee camp in the Garissa district of Kenya.

On February 10, 2007, he was replaced as army chief-of-staff by Abdullahi Ali Omar.

== Subsequent career ==
The same day he was dismissed as army chief-of-staff (February 10, 2007), Prime Minister Ali Mohamed Ghedi appointed Ismael Qasim Naji to the position of Ambassador to Oman.
