= Military ranks of Somalia =

The Military ranks of Somalia are the military insignia used by the Somali Armed Forces. Being a former Italian protectorate, Somalia shares a rank structure similar to that of Italy.

The highest rank is lieutenant general. The two persons currently holding this rank are Bashir Mohamed Jama and Said Mohamed Hersy former head of the Somali Custodial Corps (Somali: Ciidamada Asluubta).

== Commissioned officer ranks ==
The rank insignia of commissioned officers.

Rank group	General / flag officers			Senior officers			Junior officers
Somali National Army
Somali National Army	Sareeye guud	Sareeye gaas	Sareeye guuto	Gashaanle sare	Gashaanle dhexe	Gashaanle	Dhamme	Laba xídígle	Xídígle
Somali Navy
Somali Navy	Admiraal guud	Admiraal gaas	Admiraal guuto	Gashaanle sare	Gashaanle dhexe	Gashaanle	Dhamme	Laba xídígle	Xídígle
Somali Air Force
Somali Air Force	Sareeye guud	Sareeye gaas	Sareeye guuto	Gashaanle sare	Gashaanle dhexe	Gashaanle	Dhamme	Laba xídígle	Xídígle
Rank group	General / flag officers			Senior officers			Junior officers

== Other ranks ==
The rank insignia of non-commissioned officers and enlisted personnel.

Rank group	Senior NCOs					Junior NCOs		Enlisted
Somali National Army								No insignia
Somali National Army	Musharax sarkaal	Sadex xarígle	Laba xarígle	Xarígle	Sadex alífle	Laba alífle	Alífle	Dable
Somali Navy								No insignia
Somali Navy	Musharax sarkaal	Sadex xarígle	Laba xarígle	Xarígle	Sadex alífle	Laba alífle	Alífle	Dable
Somali Air Force								No insignia
Somali Air Force	Musharax sarkaal	Sadex xarígle	Laba xarígle	Xarígle	Sadex alífle	Laba alífle	Alífle	Dable
Rank group	Senior NCOs					Junior NCOs		Enlisted
