= Said Mohamed Hersy =

Somali military official

His Excellency Said Mohamed Hersy Gen
- Siciid Maxamed Xirsi سعيد محمد هرسي
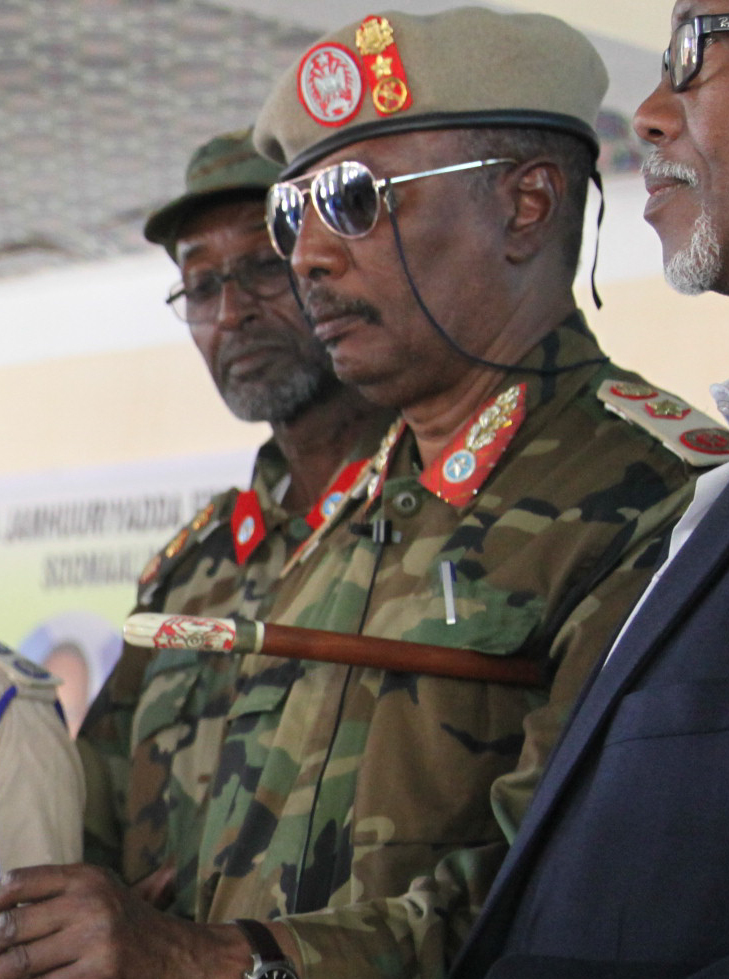
- Said Mohamed Hersi in (2017)
- Military career
- Allegiance: Transitional Federal Government (2004‍–‍2009); Puntland armed forces (1998‍–‍2018)
- Branch: Somali Armed Forces: Somali National Army; Puntland Dervish Force
- Rank: Sareeye guud
- Nickname: General Siciid Dheere
- Commands: Chief of Army
- Conflicts: Galgala campaign

Sareeye gaas Said Mohamed Hersy (Somali: Siciid Maxamed Xirsi "Siciid Dheere", Arabic: سعيد محمد هرسي) also known as 'General Siciid Dheere' is a Somali military official. Beginning in 2008, he served as Chief of Army under the Transitional Federal Government. Dheere was replaced with Yusuf Osman Dhumal on 15 May 2009, and subsequently became a security advisor to then President Sheikh Sharif Ahmed.
