= Salah Hassan Jama =

Salah Hassan Jama صالح حسن جامع
- Military career
- Allegiance: (Somalia) Transitional Federal Government
- Branch: Somali National Army
- Rank: General
- Nickname: "Salah Liif"
- Commands: Chief of Army
- Conflicts: War in Somalia (2006–2009)

General Salah Hassan Jama (Somali: Saalax Xasan Jamaac, Arabic: صالح حسن جامع), also known as Salah Liif, is a Somali military official. On 21 July 2007, he was appointed Somalia's Chief of Army. Jama served in this capacity until 11 June 2008, when he was replaced with Said Dheere Mohamed.
