= Somali Air Defence Force =

Air Defence Force in Somalia

Somali Air Defence Forces
- Ciidamada Difaaca Cirka Soomaaliyeed
- Active: 1970s–1991
- Disbanded: 1991
- Country: Somalia
- Role: Air Defence
- Part of: Somali Armed Forces
- Garrison/HQ: Mogadishu, Somalia

The Somali Air Defence Force (Somali: Ciidanka Difaaca Cirka Soomaaliyeed) was the aerial defense branch of the Somali Armed Forces, active from the 1970s until the collapse of the central government in 1991.

== History ==
Air defence installations in Somalia were active by September 1974. They included air defence missiles, anti-aircraft guns, and early warning radars. Following the Soviet pattern, a separate Air Defence Force was eventually established, a fourth military service, alongside the army, navy, and air force. The classified supplement to the 1981 edition of the CIA World Factbook in 1981 does not list any separate air defence force; the 1984 edition does, at a strength of 3,500 (and the air force at 2,000 strong.) As detailed in declassified 1987 U.S. Defense Intelligence Agency records, the ADF consisted of approximately 3,500 personnel, headquartered in Mogadishu, and was organized into seven anti-aircraft gun/surface-to-air missile brigades and one radar brigade.

By the mid-1980s, the Somali Air Defence Force had assumed control over most of the country's surface-to-air missile (SAM) systems. As of 1 June 1989, the International Institute for Strategic Studies (IISS) estimated Somalia's inventory to include approximately 40 SA-2 Guideline missiles (with uncertain operational status), 10 SA-3 Goa systems, and 20 SA-7 shoulder-fired missiles.

=== Collapse During Civil War ===
With the outbreak of civil war in the late 1980s, the effectiveness of the SADF began to decline. With the collapse of the central government in 1991, it ceased to function. Military infrastructure, including radar installations and missile systems, was either destroyed, looted, or abandoned. By 1993, none of the surface-to-air missile systems were known to be functional.

== See also ==
- Somali Air Force
- Somali Armed Forces
- Somali National Army
