= Division 43 (Somalia) =

- Qeybta 43aad
- Flag of the Somali National Army
- Active: 2014-present
- Country: Somalia
- Branch: Somali National Army
- Type: Infantry
- Size: Division
- HQ: Kismayo, Somalia
- Engagements: Battle of Baar-Sanguuni

Commanders
- Current commander: Gen. Ali Mohamed Mohamud (Bogmadow)

Division 43, Somali National Army (Somali: Qeybta 43aad) is a division of the Somali National Army. Focused on the southern part of the country, it is headquartered in Kismayo and covers the state of Jubaland.

== Formations and battles ==
The division has three major subordinate formations, the 10th Brigade (Somali: Guutada 10aad), focused on the Gedo region and Middle Juba and headquartered in Garbahaarey, the 11th Brigade, focused on Lower Juba and headquartered in Kismayo, and the 30th Brigade, headquartered in El Wak and focused on the Gedo region. The division also has a demining unit attached independently.

In 2018, the 11th Brigade led an offensive north to the village of Baar-Sanguuni, leading to the capture of the village and the deaths of 7 militants.

In November 2021, a joint offensive in the Gedo region by the 10th Brigade led to the capture of Barwaqo and Kabis from al-Shabaab.

In January 2022, Al-Shabaab militants attacked a base of the 11th Brigade in Baar-Sanguuni, which was repelled.

In March 2022, the 11th Brigade, alongside the Jubaland Darawiish conducted an operation against al-Shabaab near the village of Jamame, killing 10 militants and arresting 6 others.

In December 2024, the division commander and 11th Brigade relieved Division 2 at Kamboni.

The division was commanded by General Aaden Kaalmooy until 2022.

The division is now commanded by General Ali Mohamed Mohamud, nicknamed "Bogmadow".

== Corruption and political issues ==
Following the establishment of the Interim Juba Administration and the election of Ahmed Madobe, the Jubaland government agreed to integrate up to 1,440 fighters of various militias and of the Darawiish into Division 43 and the SNA, along with another 1,440 new recruits and independent militias in 2015. However by January 2016, it was noticed that up to 500 troops had dropped out of the integration process. While there hadn't been any official SNA forces in the division until the inauguration in July 2015 in Kismayo, SNA documents provided to the United Nations Security Council had been reporting a consistent 3,034 personnel since 2013. This money had not been accounted for.

Through 2020 and 2021, elements of the federal forces and Division 43 have been at heads with the local Darawiish forces, with a battle in Balad Hawo between 700 SNA troops against the Darawiish in May 2020, and fierce battles between Jubaland forces and SNA troops again in Balad Hawo in January 2021, leading to the capture of several hundred Jubaland soldiers. Somali minister of information Osman Dubbe launched allegations that the Kenyan government was arming these militias, which they denied.
