= Abdullahi Ali Omar =

Abdullahi Ali Omar عبد الله علي عمر
- Born: 1947; Galkayo, Somalia
- Military career
- Allegiance: (Somalia) Transitional Federal Government
- Branch: Somali National Army
- Rank: General
- Nickname: "Daad"
- Commands: Chief of Staff, Puntland; Chief of Army, TFG
- Conflicts: War in Somalia (2006–2009)

General Abdullahi Ali Omar (Somali: Cabdilaahi Cali Cumar, Arabic: عبد الله علي عمر), a.k.a. Daad, is a Somali military official. He previously served as Somalia's Chief of Army.

== Biography ==
Omar hails from the town of Galkayo, situated in the north-central Mudug region of Somalia.

In his younger years, he studied at Jamal Abdel Nasser High School in Mogadishu before joining the army. He is from Meheri clan

Omar later served as Chief of Staff of the armed forces in Puntland. On 10 February 2007, he was appointed Chief of Army of the Transitional Federal Government. He held the position until 21 July 2007, when he was replaced with Salah Hassan Jama and reassigned to a post in the Ministry of Internal Affairs.
