= Division 60 (Somalia) =

- Qeybta 60aad
- Active: 1970s-1990 2013-present
- Country: Somalia
- Branch: Somali National Army
- Type: Infantry
- Size: Division

Commanders
- Current commander: Gen. Mohamed Sheikh Abdullahi Irro

Division 60, Somali National Army (Somali: Qeybta 60aad) is a division of the Somali Armed Forces. It has been active in two periods from the 1970s to about 1990 (though being upgraded in status in the process to the level of a corps), fighting in the Ogaden War against Ethiopia, and from 2013 to the present. Abdullahi Yusuf Irro once commanded the 60th Division.

Under the leadership of General Abdullah Mohamed Fadil, Abdullahi Ahmed Irro and other senior Somali military officials formulated a plan of attack for what was to become the Ogaden War in Ethiopia. At the start of the offensive, the SNA consisted of 35,000 soldiers, and was vastly outnumbered by the Ethiopian forces. Somali troops seized the Godey Front on 24 July 1977, after Division 60 defeated the Ethiopian 4th Infantry Division. Godey's capture allowed the Somali side to consolidate its hold on the Ogaden, concentrate its forces, and advance further to other regions of Ethiopia. The invasion ended abruptly with the Soviet Union's sudden shift of support to Ethiopia, followed by almost the entire communist bloc siding with the latter. The Soviets halted supplies to Barre's regime and instead increased aid, weapons, and training distribution to Ethiopia's newly communist Derg regime. By 1978, the Somali forces were pushed out of most of the Ogaden, although it would take nearly three more years for the Ethiopian Army to gain complete control of Godey.

Division 60 then dissolved amid the first phase of the Somali Civil War. It was reestablished on 1 July 2013. From that time, it supervised Brigade 7 centered on Baidoa; Brigade 8 at Huddur in Bakool; and Brigade 9 in Gedo, with divisional headquarters in Baidoa. A British Army detachment is assisting the division; and the UK Foreign and Commonwealth Office have been paying stipends to Division 60 personnel for several years.

The 60th is currently commanded by General Mohamed Sheikh Abdullahi Irro.
