= Mohamed Gelle Kahiye =

Somali military official

Mohamed Gelle Kahiye محمد جيلي كاهئي
- Military career
- Allegiance: (Somalia) Transitional Federal Government
- Branch: Somali National Army
- Rank: General
- Commands: Chief of Army

Mohamed Gelle Kahiye (Somali: Maxamed Geele Kahiiye, Arabic: محمد جيلي كاهئي) is a Somali military official.

== Biography ==
Kahiye previously served as a colonel in the Somali National Army. After the start of the civil war in Somalia, he moved to Germany, where he worked as an assistant manager at McDonald's.

Kahiye subsequently returned to Somalia, and was appointed Chief of Army on 6 December 2009 by the Transitional Federal Government. He was later dismissed along with other top commanders on 6 September 2010.
