= Division "12 April" =

Division "12 April" is a division/area command of the Somali National Army. It was established in 2014, supervising Somali troops in the areas of AMISOM Sectors 1 and 5 around Mogadishu.

In March 2013 there were six brigades around Mogadishu, but only two were deemed operational. In September 2013 the division commander was General Mohammed Mohammed Hassan "Qaafow" (Hawiye/Abgaal/Wa’aysle), based at Hisbiga (Yaqshiid) in Mogadishu. He was appointed by President Hassan Sheikh Mohamud (also Hawiye/Abgaal) to the command of the division in late 2013.

The six SNA brigades around Mogadishu were as of July 2013 largely composed of officers from various Hawiye sub-clans, with some Marehan-Darod and minorities also present. Five brigades primarily consisted of Abgaal, Murosade and Hawadle soldiers. In February 2013 Brigade 2 was under the command of Brigadier General Abdullahi Osman Agey. Brigade 3 over the same period comprised 840 fighters, most of whom belonged to the Hawiye-Habar Gidir/Ayr clan. The brigade was around 30% to 50% smaller in size than the other five brigades garrisoned in the wider Mogadishu area. Led by General Mohamed Roble Jimale 'Gobale,' it occupied an area outside of Mogadishu and Merka and along the Afgoye corridor. The Monitoring Group reported that many Brigade 3 fighters had been drawn from militias controlled by Yusuf Mohamed Siyaad 'Indha Adde', a close associate of Jimale and the former Eritrean-backed chief of defence for the Alliance for the Re-liberation of Somalia-Asmara. Gobale was killed in a suspected Al-Shabaab attack on 18 September 2016. Brigade 3's primary focus became "the domination of the valuable riverine land and its businesses for financial gain. In the process, the local people, often from minority clans such as the Biimaal, were constantly oppressed, with numerous atrocities committed," including arbitrary torture of civilians.
