= Daud Abdulle Hirsi =

Somalian general and politician (1925–1965)

Daud Abdulle Hirsi داود عبد الله حرسي
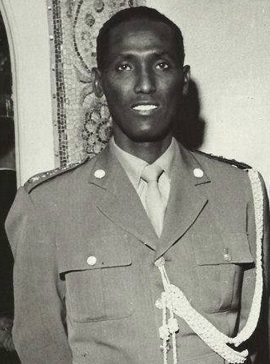
- Born: 1925; Mareeg, Italian Somalia
- Died: 1965 (aged 39–40); Moscow, Russian SFSR, Soviet Union
- Military career
- Branch: Somali National Army
- Service years: 1945s–1965
- Rank: Brigadier General
- Commands: Somali National Army
- Conflicts: 1964 Ethiopian–Somali Border War

General Daud Abdulle Hirsi (Somali: Daa'uud Cabdulle Xirsi, Arabic: داود عبد الله حرسي; 1925–1965) was a Somali police and military officer, who went on to become first Commander of the Somali Armed Forces.

== Biography ==
Hirsi was born in 1925 in the town of Mareeg situated in central Somalia. He later joined the military, and eventually rose to the rank of Commander-in-Chief of the nascent Somali National Army (Ciidamada Xoogga Dalka Soomaaliyeed), the first position of its kind. Following Somalia's independence in 1960, Hirsi became Minister of Defence in the country's new civilian administration.

Hirsi died shortly thereafter in 1965 in Moscow, Russia. Several primary and secondary schools in addition to a main street in Mogadishu, the nation's capital, are named after him. The Cup of General Daud, an annual football competition in Somalia, is also titled in his honor. Hirsi was well known for his family who were indeed very close to him. Hirsi helped develop Somalia into a stable country and that also led to praise by then president Aden Abdullah Osman.

General Daud was born in the town of Mareeg in Ceel-dheer district in 1925. He was born to a religious and loving family.He grew up in the country among the pastoralists. In his youth he was known to be athletic and participate in long distance running. He began his education in the local madras learning the quran, where he excelled and become a kabiir(senior). As a young man he moved to Buloburde and was employed in the local colonial office. As a young soldier he participated in the Italian invasion of Abyssinia. On his return in 1954 he was promoted to lieutenant in the police force, contributing greatly to the development of the Somali military. Upon development of the Somali Armed Forces, he was promoted to first General and Chief of staff of the military. He is known as the father of the modern Somali military and worked tirelessly to further the cause of the forces. General Daud died in 1965 Moscow, Russia during military training. He was mourned by entire Somali nation and particularly the military that he created. Aden Adde the President of Somalia at the time, upon hearing the loss of General daud, said “The Somali Military, today lost its father”. His colleagues referred to him as staunch nationalist, a hero of the Somali nation, who never faltered in his duty and cause. He retains the respect of all Somali military personnel.

== See also ==
- Military of Somalia
