= Somali Armed Forces =

Armed forces of the Federal Republic of Somalia

- Xoogga Dalka Soomaaliyeed القوات المسلحة الصومالية 𐒄𐒝𐒌𐒌𐒖 𐒊𐒖𐒐𐒏𐒖 𐒉𐒝𐒑𐒛𐒐𐒘𐒕𐒜𐒆
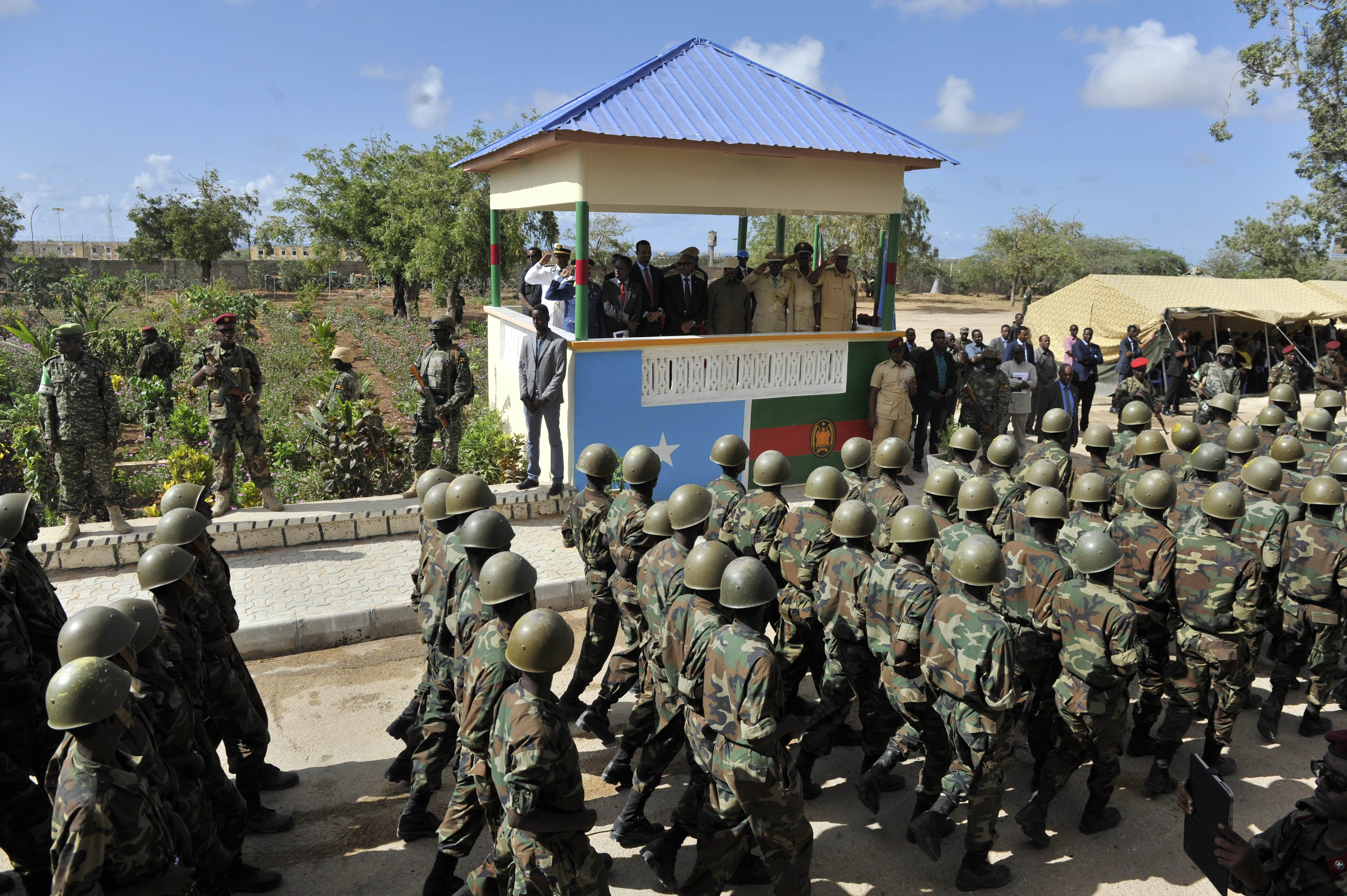
- Ceremony commemorating the 55th Anniversary of the SNA held at the Army Headquarters on 12 April 2015.
- Founded: 12 April 1960; 66 years ago
- Current form: August 2008
- Service branches: Somali National Army; Somali Navy; Somali Air Force
- Headquarters: Mogadishu, Somalia

Leadership
- President of Somalia, Commander-in-Chief: Hassan Sheikh Mohamud
- Minister of Defence: Ahmed Moalim Fiqi
- Chief of Defence Force: Brigadier General Ibrahim Mohamed Mohamud

Personnel
- Active personnel: IISS estimated 19,000 in early 2026.

Industry
- Foreign suppliers: See Equipment section below

Related articles
- History: See list: Shifta War; 1961 revolt in Somalia; 1964 Ethiopian–Somali Border War; 1969 Somali coup d'état; Somali invasion of Ogaden; Ogaden War; Rhamu Incident; Somali Civil War; Somaliland War of Independence; 1982 Ethiopian–Somali Border War; Somali Rebellion; Somalia War (2006–2009); Isaaq Genocide; Somali Civil War (2009–present); Operation Indian Ocean (2014); Jubaland crisis
- Ranks: Military ranks of Somalia

The Somali Armed Forces are the military forces of the Federal Republic of Somalia. Headed by the president as commander-in-chief, they are constitutionally mandated to ensure the nation's sovereignty, independence and territorial integrity.

In 1990 the Armed Forces were made up of the Army, Air Force, Air Defence Force, and Navy. From the early 1960s to 1977, the period when good relations existed between Somalia and the Soviet Union, the Armed Forces had the largest armored and mechanized force in sub-Saharan Africa. Due to Barre's increasing reliance on his own clan, splitting the Armed Forces along clan lines, and the Somali Rebellion, by 1988 they began to disintegrate. By the time President Siad Barre fled Mogadishu in January 1991, the last cohesive army grouping, the 'Red Berets,' had deteriorated into a clan militia.

An unsteady rebuilding process began after 2000, and gained pace after the Djibouti Agreement of 2008. The northeastern region of Puntland maintains its own separate military forces.

== History ==
=== Middle Ages to colonial period ===
Historically, Somali society conferred distinction upon warriors (waranle) and rewarded military acumen. All Somali males were regarded as potential soldiers, except for men of religion. Somalia's many sultanates each maintained regular troops. In the early Middle Ages, the [conquest of Shewa by the Ifat Sultanate ignited a rivalry for supremacy with the Solomonic dynasty.

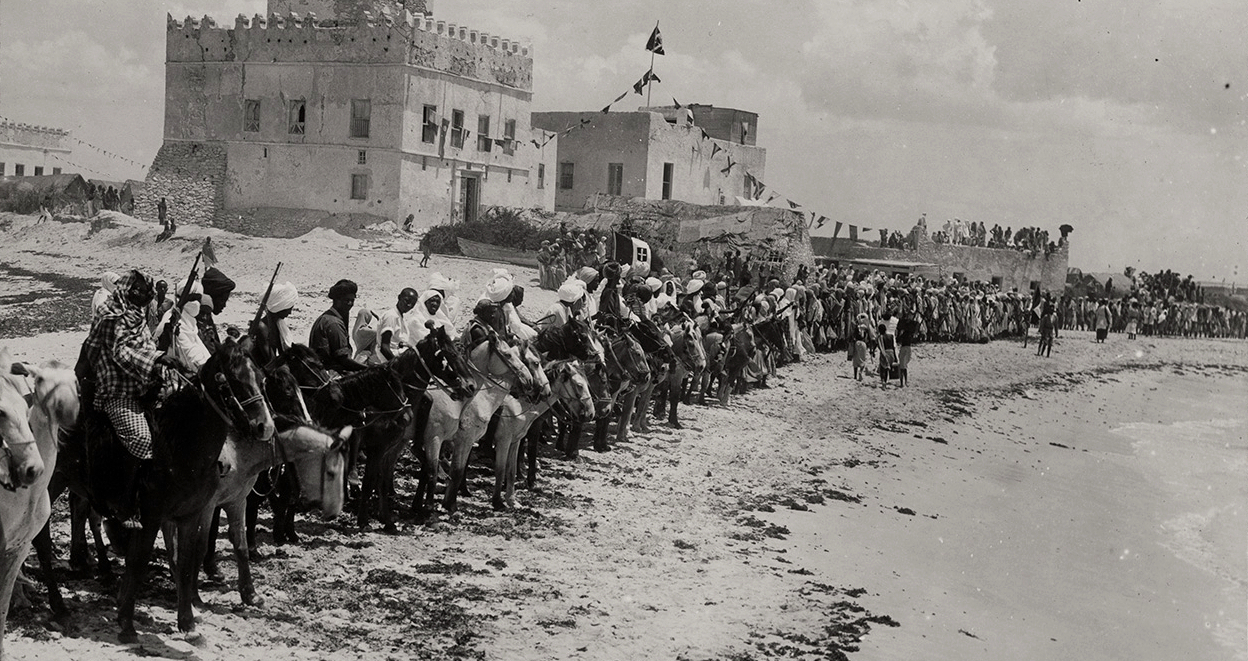
Hobyo Sultanate cavalry and fort, 1924

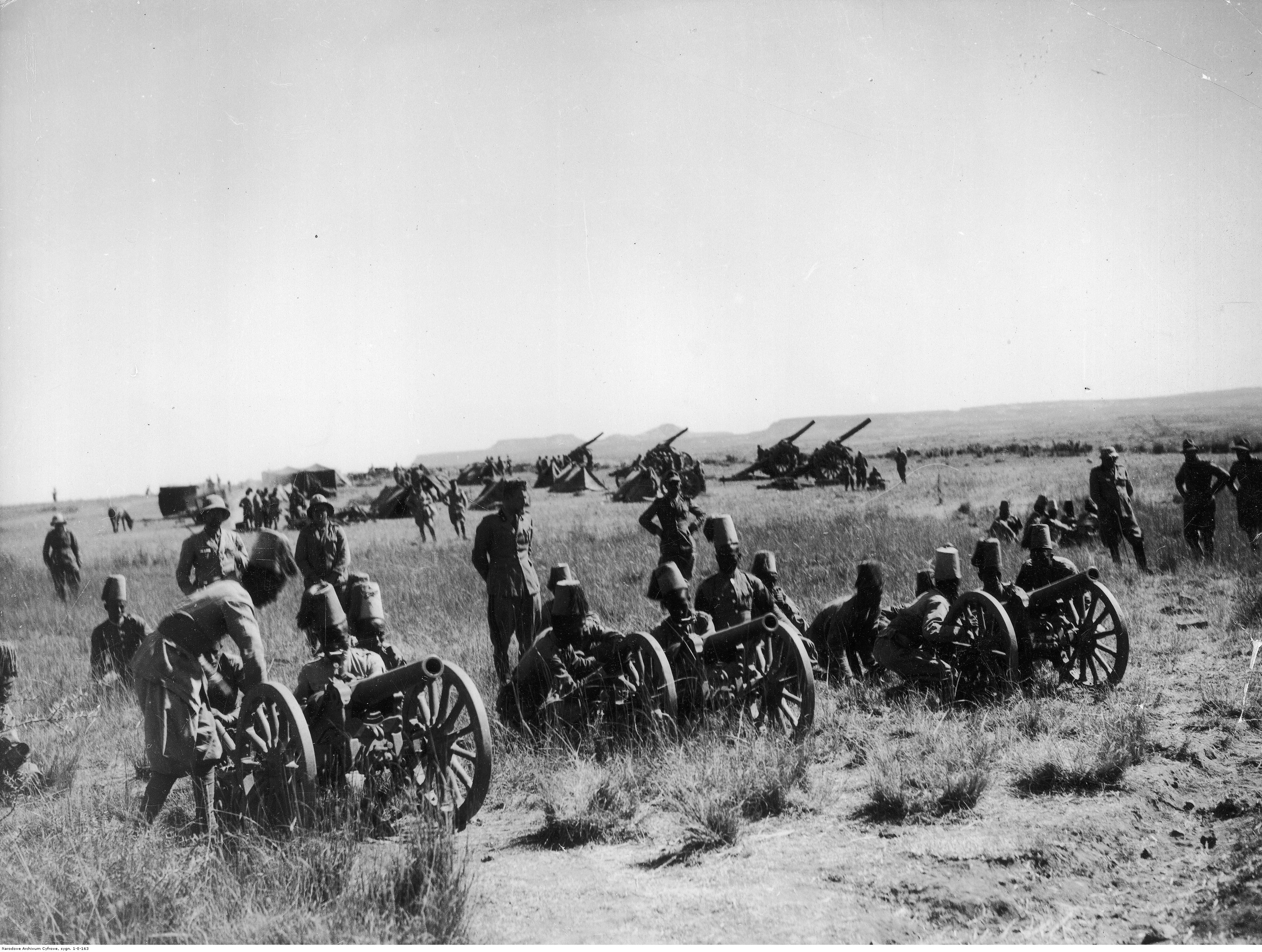
Somali Italian army artillery during the second Italo-Ethiopian War

Many similar battles were fought between the succeeding Sultanate of Adal and the Solomonids, with both sides achieving victory and suffering defeat. During the protracted Ethiopian-Adal War (1529–1559), Imam Ahmad ibn Ibrahim al-Ghazi defeated several Ethiopian Emperors and embarked on a conquest referred to as the Futuh Al-Habash ("Conquest of Abyssinia"), which brought three-quarters of Christian Abyssinia under the power of the Muslim Adal Sultanate. Al-Ghazi's forces and their Ottoman allies came close to extinguishing the ancient Ethiopian kingdom, but the Abyssinians managed to secure the assistance of Cristóvão da Gama's Portuguese troops and maintain their autonomy. However, both polities in the process exhausted their resources and manpower, which resulted in the contraction of both powers and changed regional dynamics for centuries to come. Many historians trace the origins of hostility between Somalia and Ethiopia to this war. Some scholars also argue that this conflict proved, through their use on both sides, the value of firearms such as the matchlock musket, cannons and the arquebus over traditional weapons.

At the turn of the 20th century, the Majeerteen Sultanate, Sultanate of Hobyo, Warsangali Sultanate and Dervish State employed cavalry in their battles against the imperialist European powers during the Campaign of the Sultanates.

In Italian Somaliland, eight "Arab-Somali" infantry battalions, the Ascari, and several irregular units of Italian officered dubats were established. These units served as frontier guards and police. There were also Somali artillery and zaptié (carabinieri) units forming part of the Italian Royal Corps of Colonial Troops from 1889 to 1941. Between 1911 and 1912, over 1,000 Somalis from Mogadishu served as combat units along with Eritrean and Italian soldiers in the Italo-Turkish War. Most of these troops never returned home until they were transferred back to Italian Somaliland in preparation for the invasion of Ethiopia in 1935.

In 1914, the Somaliland Camel Corps was formed in British Somaliland and saw service before, during, and after the Italian invasion of the territory during World War II.

=== 1960 to 1978 ===
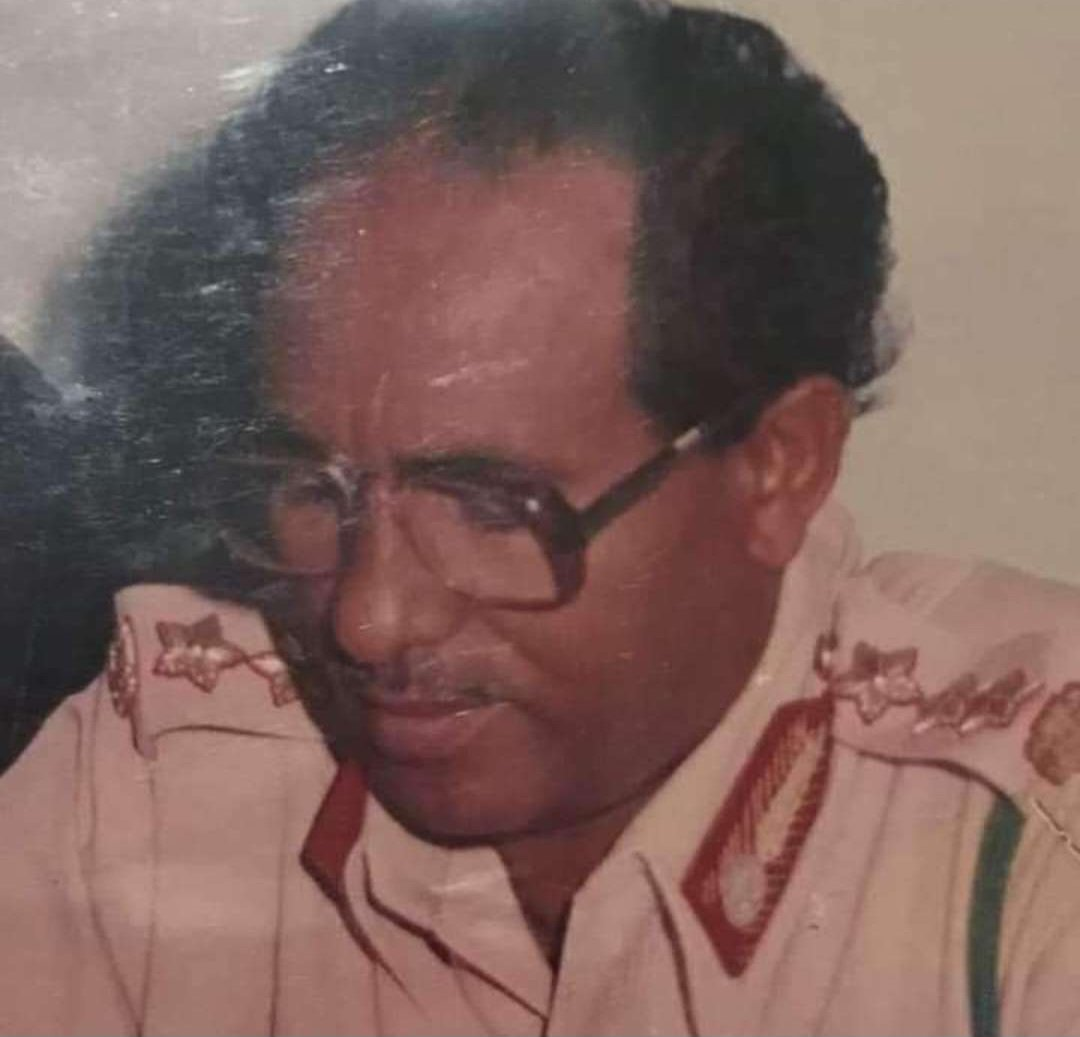
Colonel Abdullahi Ahmed Irro, the commander of the Somali Armed Forces, pictured in 1977.

Just prior to independence in 1960, the Trust Territory of Somalia established a national army to defend the nascent Somali Republic's borders. A law to that effect was passed on 6 April 1960. Thus the Somali Police Force's Mobile Group (Darawishta Poliska or Darawishta) was formed. 12 April 1960 has since been marked as Armed Forces Day. British Somaliland became independent on 26 June 1960 as the State of Somaliland, and the Trust Territory of Somalia (the former Italian Somaliland) followed suit five days later. On 1 July 1960, the two territories united to form the Somali Republic. After independence, the Darawishta merged with the former British Somaliland Scouts to form the 5,000 strong Somali National Army. The new military's first commander was Colonel Daud Abdulle Hirsi, a former officer in the British military administration's police force, the Somalia Gendarmerie. Officers were trained in the United Kingdom, Egypt and Italy. Despite the social and economic benefits associated with military service, the armed forces began to suffer chronic manpower shortages only a few years after independence.

Merging British and Italian Somaliland caused significant controversy. The distribution of power between the two regions and among the major clans in both areas was a bone of contention. In December 1961, a group of British-trained northern non-commissioned officers in Hargeisa revolted after southern officers took command of their units. The rebellion was put down by other northern Noncommissioned officers (NCOs), although dissatisfaction in the north lingered. Adam notes that in the aftermath of this mutiny, first armed forces commander General Daud Abdulle Hirsi (Hawiye/Abgaal) placed the most senior northerner, Colonel Mohamed Haji Ainashe, as head of the army in the north.

By October 1962 British officials were reporting that there was a Northern Military Zone with its headquarters in Hargeisa, supervising two battalions in Hargisa and Burao, while in the south, Army HQ in Mogadishu supervised four battalions, at Mogadishu, Beletweyne, Galkayo, and Baidoa. These four battalions plus smaller units were to come under control of a planned Southern Military Zone.

The force was expanded and modernized after the rebellion with the assistance of Soviet and Cuban advisors. The Library of Congress wrote in the early 1990s that "[i]n 1962 the Soviet Union agreed to grant a US$32 million loan to modernise the Somali army, and expand it to 14,000 personnel. Moscow later increased the amount to US$55 million. The Soviet Union, seeking to counter United States influence in the Horn of Africa, made an unconditional loan" and set a "generous twenty-year repayment schedule." However other sources date the Somali-Soviet discussions to October 1963 or later, and discuss how the United States, West Germany, Great Britain, and Italy tried and failed to get Somalia to accept a Western counteroffer through 1962 and 1963.

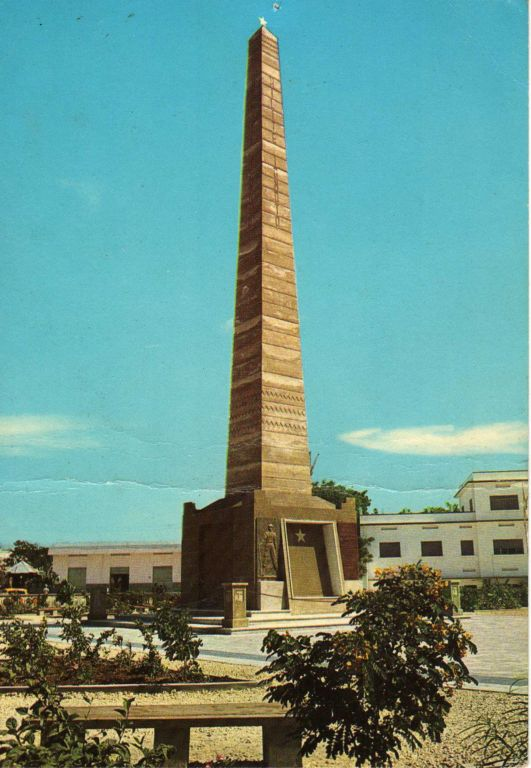
Somalia's Tomb of the Unknown Soldier

The army was tested in 1964 when the conflict with Ethiopia over the Somali-inhabited Ogaden erupted into warfare. On 16 June 1963, Somali guerrillas started an insurgency at Hodayo, in eastern Ethiopia, a watering place north of Werder, after Ethiopian Emperor Haile Selassie rejected their demand for self-government in the Ogaden. The Somali government initially refused to support the guerrilla forces, which eventually numbered about 3,000. However, in January 1964, after Ethiopia sent reinforcements to the Ogaden, Somali forces launched ground and air attacks across the border and started providing assistance to the guerrillas. The Ethiopian Air Force responded with punitive strikes across its southwestern frontier against Feerfeer, northeast of Beledweyne, and Galkayo. On 6 March 1964, Somalia and Ethiopia agreed to a cease-fire. At the end of the month, the two sides signed an accord in Khartoum, Sudan, agreeing to withdraw their troops from the border, cease hostile propaganda, and start peace negotiations. Somalia also terminated its support of the guerrillas.

During the power vacuum that followed the assassination of Somalia's second president, Abdirashid Ali Shermarke, the military staged a coup d'état on 21 October 1969 (the day after Shermarke's funeral) and took over office. Major General Mohamed Siad Barre, who had succeeded Hersi as Chief of Army in 1965, was installed as President of the Supreme Revolutionary Council, the new junta of Somalia. The country was renamed the Somali Democratic Republic.

Soviet advisors, among them General Vasily Shakhnovich, began to arrive in 1969. The Institute for Strategic Studies listed Somalia for the first time in its green-covered Military Balance 1970-71, estimating total armed forces at 12,000, of which 10,000 were in the Army and 1,750 in the Air Force. General Shakhnovich built a close relationship with Barre, and stayed until 1971. General Grigory Borisov (ru:Борисов, Григорий Григорьевич) served in the same position in 1973–76, writing a book about his experiences.

In 1972, the National Security Court, headed by Admiral Mohamed Gelle Yusuf, ordered the execution of Siad Barre's fellow coup instigators, Major General Mohamed Aynanshe Guleid (who had become the Vice President), Brigadier General Salaad Gabeyre Kediye and Lieutenant Colonel Abdulkadir Dheel Abdulle.

Kaplan wrote in 1976:

In mid-1976 the military command structure was simple and direct. Major General Mohammad Ali Samatar was not only commander of the National Army – and therefore commander of the organizationally subordinated navy and air force- but also secretary of state for defence and a vice president of SRC and thus a member of the major decision-making body of the government. Holding the two highest.. posts, he stood alone in the command structure between the army and President Siad, the head of state. When in July 1976 the SRC relinquished its power to the newly appointed SSRP, Samantar retained the portfolio of the Ministry of Defense. The country's real power appeared to be in the SSRP's Politburo, of which Samantar became a vice president. Before the military coup, command channels ran directly from the commander of the National Army to army sector commanders who exercised authority over military forces.. in the field, and [later] combat units had been reorganized along Soviet lines. There is no indication that either the chain of command to lower echelons or the organisation of combat units has changed significantly since the coup.

In July 1976, the International Institute for Strategic Studies estimated the army consisted of 22,000 personnel, 6 tank battalions, 9 mechanised infantry battalions, 5 infantry battalions, 2 commando battalions, and 11 artillery battalions (5 anti-aircraft). Two hundred T-34 and 50 T-54/55 main battle tanks had been estimated to have been delivered. The IISS emphasised that 'spares are short and not all equipment is serviceable.' The U.S. Army Area Handbook for Somalia, 1977 edition, agreed that the army comprised six tank and nine mechanised infantry battalions, but listed no infantry battalions, the two commando battalions, five field artillery, and five anti-aircraft battalions.

Three divisions (Division 21, Division 54, and Division 60) were formed, and later took part in the Ogaden War. There is evidence that the divisions were formed as early as 1970; Mohamud Muse Hersi has been listed by somaliaonline.com as commander of the 21st Division from 1970 to 1972, and Muse Hassan Sheikh Sayid Abdulle as commander 26th Division in 1970–71.

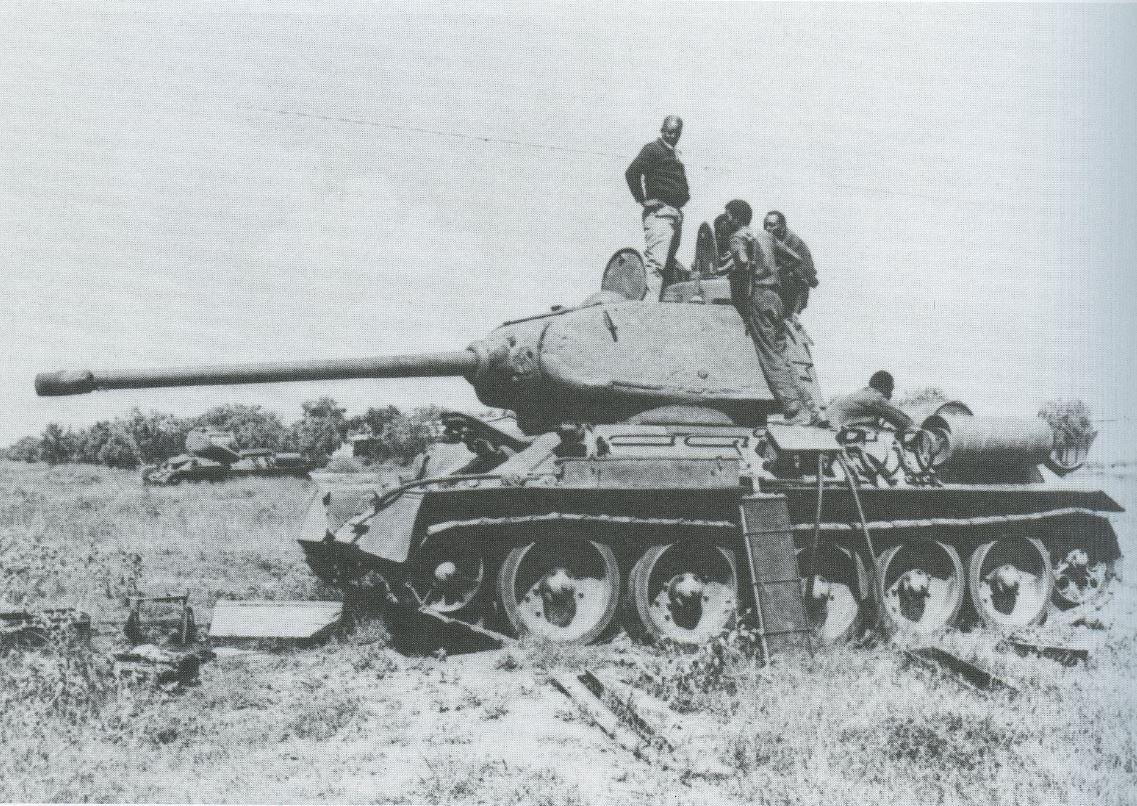
Somali engineers repair a captured Ethiopian T-34/85 Model 1969 tank for use by the Western Somali Liberation Front in the Ogaden region, March 1978

Under the leadership of General Abdullah Mohamed Fadil, Abdullahi Ahmed Irro and other senior Somali military officials formulated a plan of attack for what was to become the Ogaden War in Ethiopia. This was part of a broader effort to unite all of the Somali-inhabited territories in the Horn region into a Greater Somalia. At the start of the offensive, the SNA consisted of 35,000 soldiers, and was vastly outnumbered by the Ethiopian forces. Somali troops seized the Godey Front on 24 July 1977, after Division 60 defeated the Ethiopian 4th Infantry Division. Godey's capture allowed Somalia to consolidate its hold on the Ogaden, concentrate its forces, and advance further to other regions of Ethiopia. The invasion reached an abrupt end with the Soviet Union's sudden shift of support to Ethiopia, followed by almost the entire communist Second World siding with the latter. The Soviets halted supplies to Barre's regime and instead increased the distribution of aid, weapons, and training to Ethiopia's newly communist Derg regime. General Vasily Petrov was assigned to restructure the Ethiopian Army. The Soviets also brought in around 15,000 Cuban troops to assist the Ethiopian military. By 1978, the Somali forces were pushed out of most of the Ogaden, although it would take nearly three more years for the Ethiopian Army to gain full control of Godey.

During the war battalions were succeeded by brigades. "During the war the standard infantry and mechanized infantry unit became the brigade, [numbering] two to four battalions and having a total strength of 1,200 to 2,000." Also following the war, Abudwak became the base for Division 21.

=== Decline and collapse, 1978–1991 ===
The shift in support by the Soviet Union during the Ogaden War motivated the Barre regime to seek allies elsewhere. The need for a rethink was emphasized by a failed coup d'état in 1978, which appears to have been poorly organised. Barre and his advisors eventually settled on the Soviet Union's Cold War arch-rival, the United States, which had been courting the Somali government for some time. The U.S. eventually gave extensive military support. Following the war, Barre's government began arresting government and military officials under suspicion of participation in the 1978 coup attempt. Most of the people who had allegedly helped plot the putsch were summarily executed. However, several officials managed to escape abroad where they formed the Somali Salvation Democratic Front (SSDF), the first of various dissident groups dedicated to ousting Barre's regime by force. Among these opposition movements were the Somali Patriotic Movement (SPM) and Somali Democratic Alliance (SDA), a Gadabuursi group which had been formed in the northwest to counter the Somali National Movement (SNM) Isaaq militia.

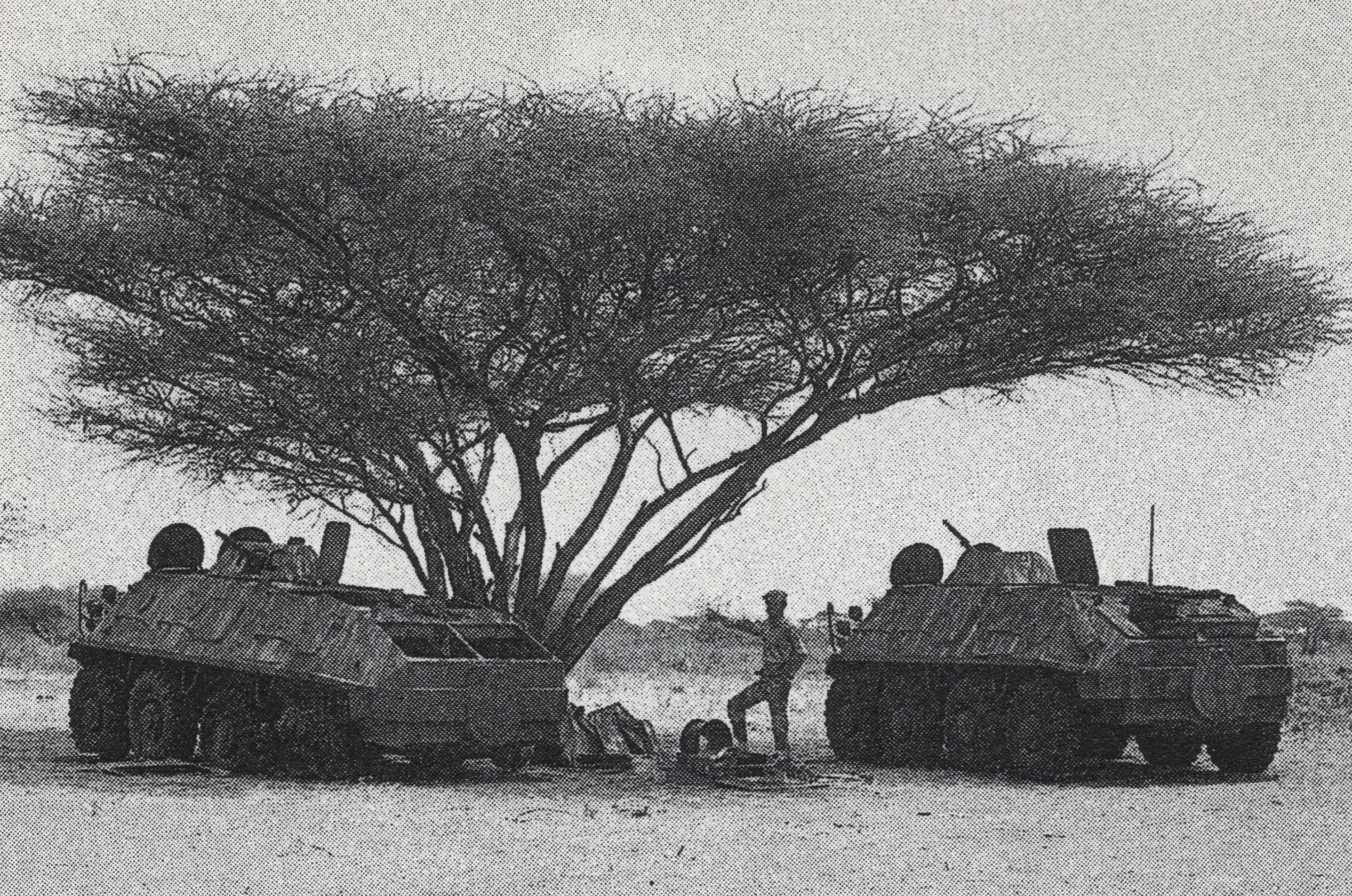
Two captured Ethiopian BTR-60 armored personnel carriers that were disabled on the battlefields near Balambale and Guldogob in 1982

The armed forces continued to expand after the Ogaden War. The army expanded to 96,000 in 1980, of which combat forces made up 60,000. Thereafter the army grew to 115,000 and eventually to 123,000 by 1984–85.

In 1981 one of three corps/sector headquarters for the ground forces was situated at Hargeisa in the northwestern Woqooyi Galbeed region (Sector 26). Others were believed to be at Galkacyo in the north-central Mudug region and at Beledweyne in the south-central Hiiraan region. The ground forces included seven divisions. Allocated among the divisions were three mechanized infantry brigades, ten anti-aircraft battalions, and thirteen artillery battalions. The classified supplements to the CIA World Factbook for the 1980s, released thirty years later, show that the CIA estimated that the force had grown to eleven divisions by January 1984, and twelve divisions by 1986.

In 1984, the government attempted to solve the manpower shortage problem by instituting obligatory military service. Men of eighteen to forty years of age were to be conscripted for two years. Opposition to conscription and to the campaigns against guerrilla groups resulted in widespread evasion of military service. As a result, during the late 1980s the government normally met manpower requirements by impressing men into military service. This practice alienated an increasing number of Somalis, who wanted the government to negotiate a peaceful resolution of the conflicts that were slowly destroying Somali society.

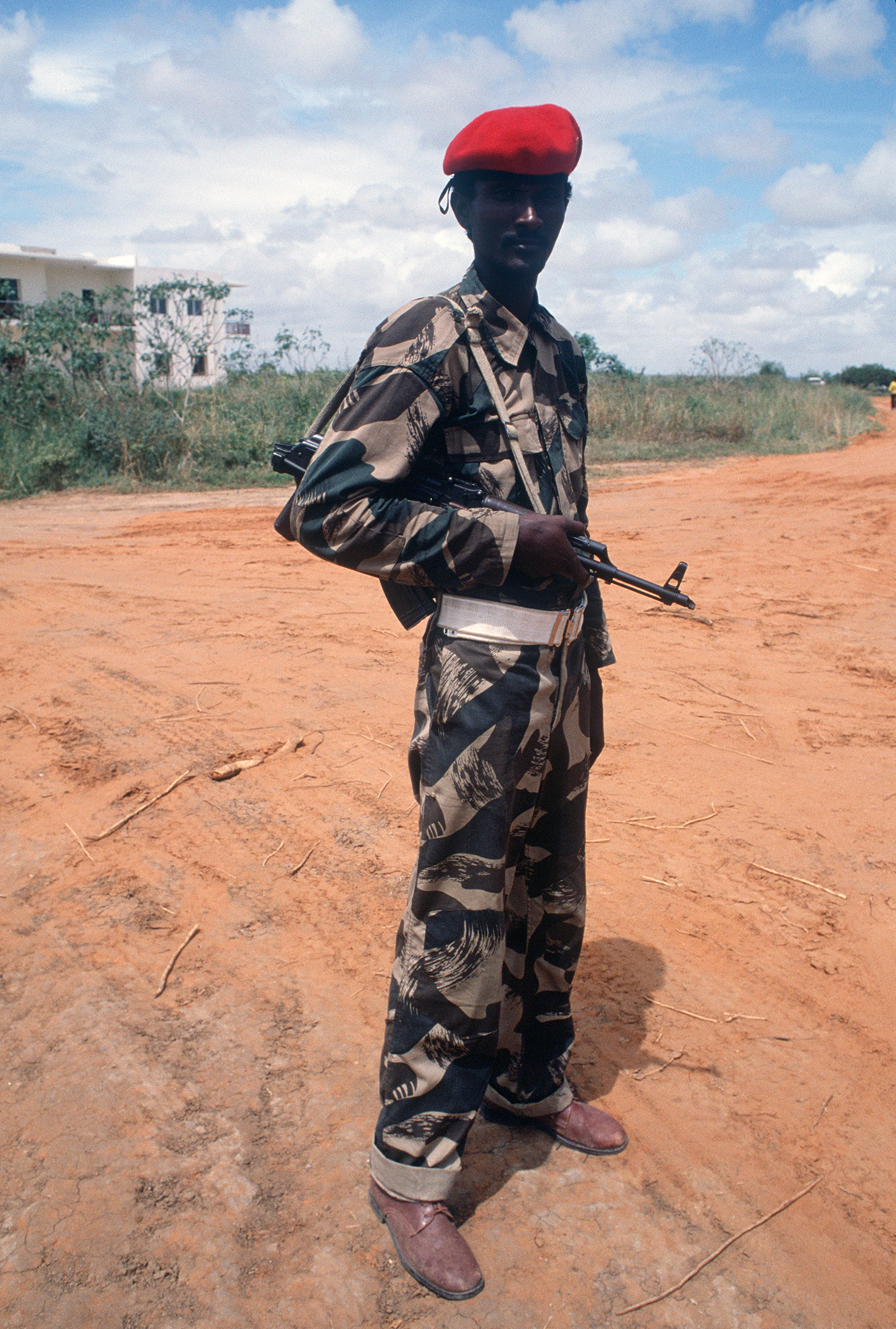
A Somali soldier with an AKM poses for a photograph during the multinational joint-service Exercise Bright Star '85.

However, as the 1980s wore on, Siad Barre increasingly used clanism as a political resource. Barre filled the key positions in the army and security forces with members of three Darood clans closely related to his own reer: the Marehan, Dhulbahante, and Ogaden known as the MOD Alliance. Adam says that '..As early as 1976, when Colonel Omar Mohamed Farah was asked to train and command a tank brigade stationed in Mogadishu, he found that out of about 540 soldiers, at least 500 were from the Marehan clan. The whole tank division was headed by a Marehan officer, Umar Haji Masala.' Compagnon wrote in 1992: "Colonels and generals were part of the president's personal patronage network; they had to remain loyal to him and his relatives, whether they had command or were temporarily in the cabinet." As a result, by 1990 many Somalis looked upon the armed forces as Siad Barre's personal army. This perception eventually destroyed the military's reputation as a national institution. The critical posts of commander of the 2nd Tank Brigade and 2nd Artillery Brigade in Mogadishu were both held by Marehan officers, as were the posts of commander of the three reserve brigades in Hargeisa in the north.

By 1987 the U.S. Defense Intelligence Agency estimated the army was 40,000 strong (with Ethiopian army strength estimated at the same time as 260,000). The president, Mohamed Siad Barre, held the rank of Major General and acted as Minister of Defence. There were three vice-ministers of national defence. From the SNA headquarters in Mogadishu four sectors were directed: Sector 26 at Hargeisa, Sector 54 at Garowe, Sector 21 at Dusa Mareb, and Sector 60 at Baidoa. Thirteen divisions, averaging 3,300 strong, were divided between the four sectors – four in the northernmost and three in each of the other sectors. The sectors were under the command of brigadiers (three) and a colonel (one). Mohammed Said Hersi Morgan has been reported as 26th Sector commander from 1986 to 1988. Barre's son, Maslah Mohammed Siad Barre was commanding the 77th Sector in Mogadishu in November 1987, and later became Chief of Staff (also reported as Commander-in-Chief) of the Army. Maslah may have become Commander-in-Chief in early March 1989.

Military exercises between the United States and the Siad Barre regime continued during the 1980s. After Exercise Eastern Wind ’83, the Los Angeles Times was told that "the exercise failed dismally.…The Somali army did not perform up to any standard," one diplomat said. … "The inefficiency of the Somali armed forces is legendary among foreign military men." 'Valiant Usher '86' took place during the U.S. Fiscal Year of 1986, but actually in late 1985, and the 24th Marine Expeditionary Unit participated in Exercise Eastern Wind in August 1987 in the area of Geesalay (in the vicinity of Cape Guardafui).

By the mid-1980s, more resistance movements supported by Ethiopia's Derg administration had sprung up across the country. Barre responded by ordering punitive destruction, especially in the heavily Issaq northern regions. The northwestern administrative center of Hargeisa, a Somali National Movement (SNM) stronghold, was almost totally destroyed by bombing and artillery in 1988. The Hargeisa war memorial today is a MiG fighter-bomber aircraft that those on the ground managed to shoot down during the attacks.

Compagnon writes that:

From the summer of 1988 onwards, there was a combination of political repression against targeted clans and private use of violence by predatory units and individuals of the former 'national' armed forces – already in the process of disintegration – who used their power to rape, kill, and loot freely. The ..distinction between private illegitimate violence and public coercion disappeared. Many former military men later joined the clan militias or the armed gangs.

Kapteijns writes:

By June 1989, the SNM was again mounting attacks on the major centers [in the north], cutting off transport routes and interfering with government supplies to its garrisons. Gradually, the government lost control of anything but the major towns and, by the end of December 1989, even these were besieged by the SNM.

U.S. Army elements conducted training with the Somali 31st Commando Brigade at Baledogle Airfield outside Mogadishu in 1989.

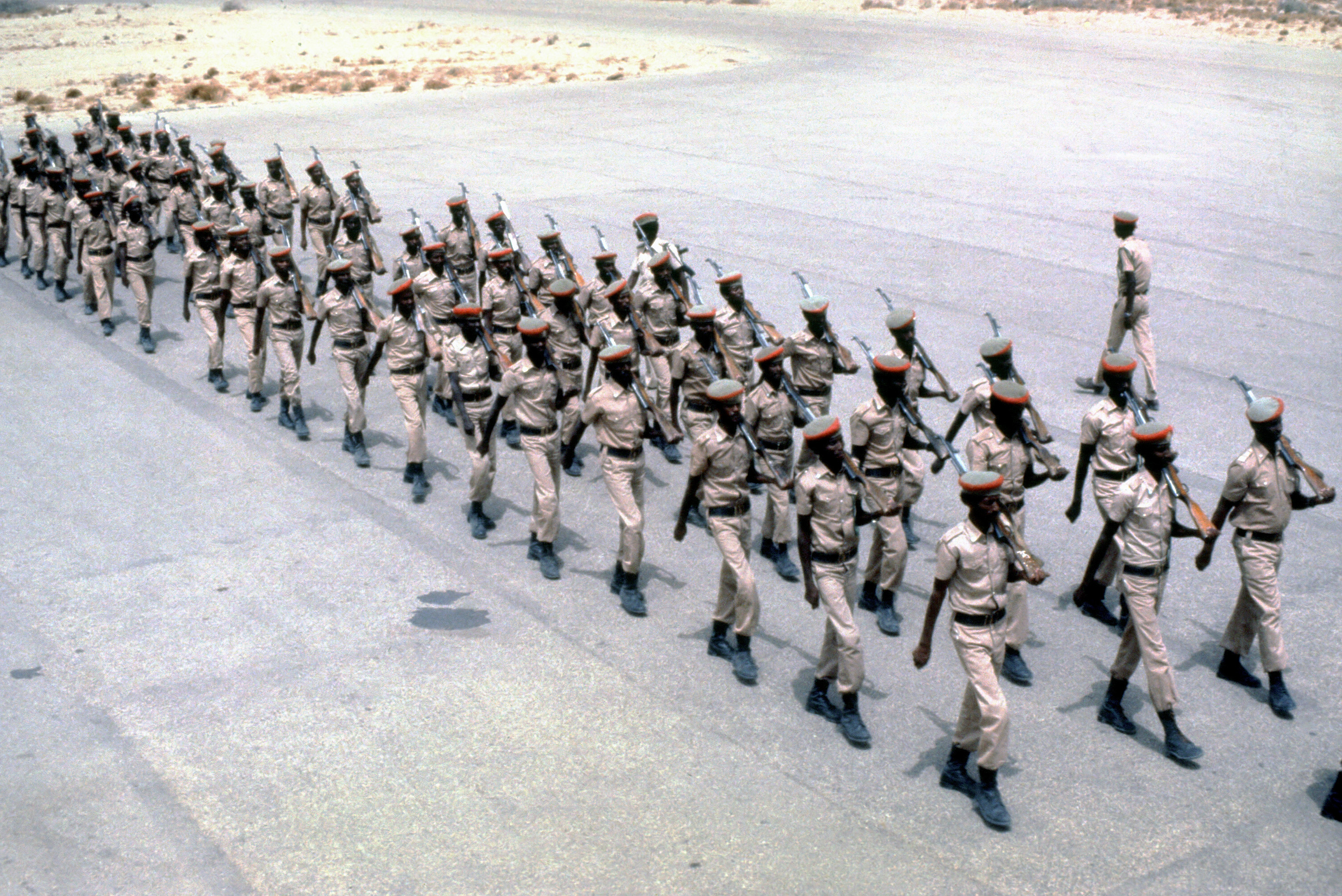
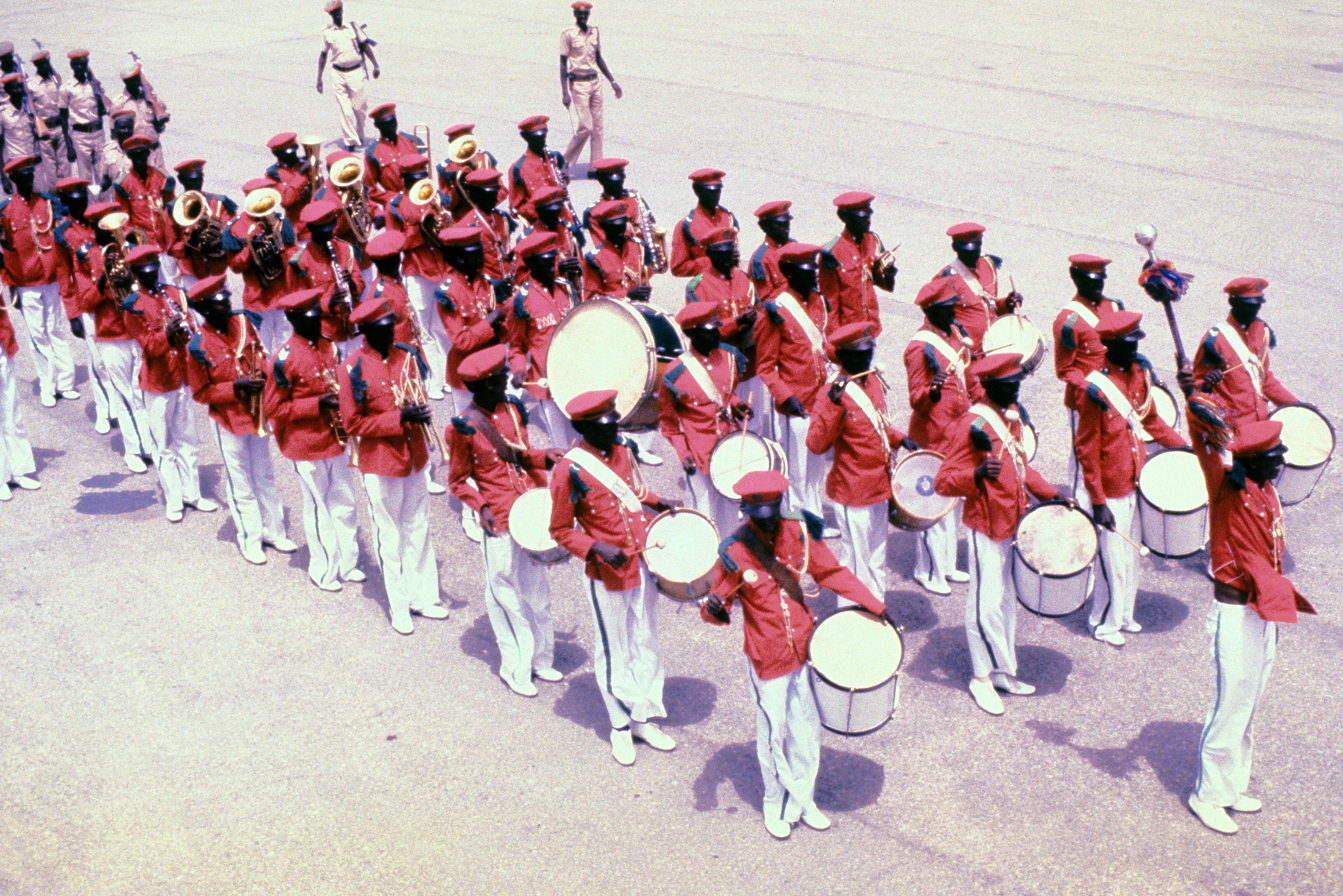
Somali troops (left) and Somali military band (right) passing in review during a ceremony of Exercise Eastern Wind '83, the amphibious landing phase of Exercise Bright Star '83

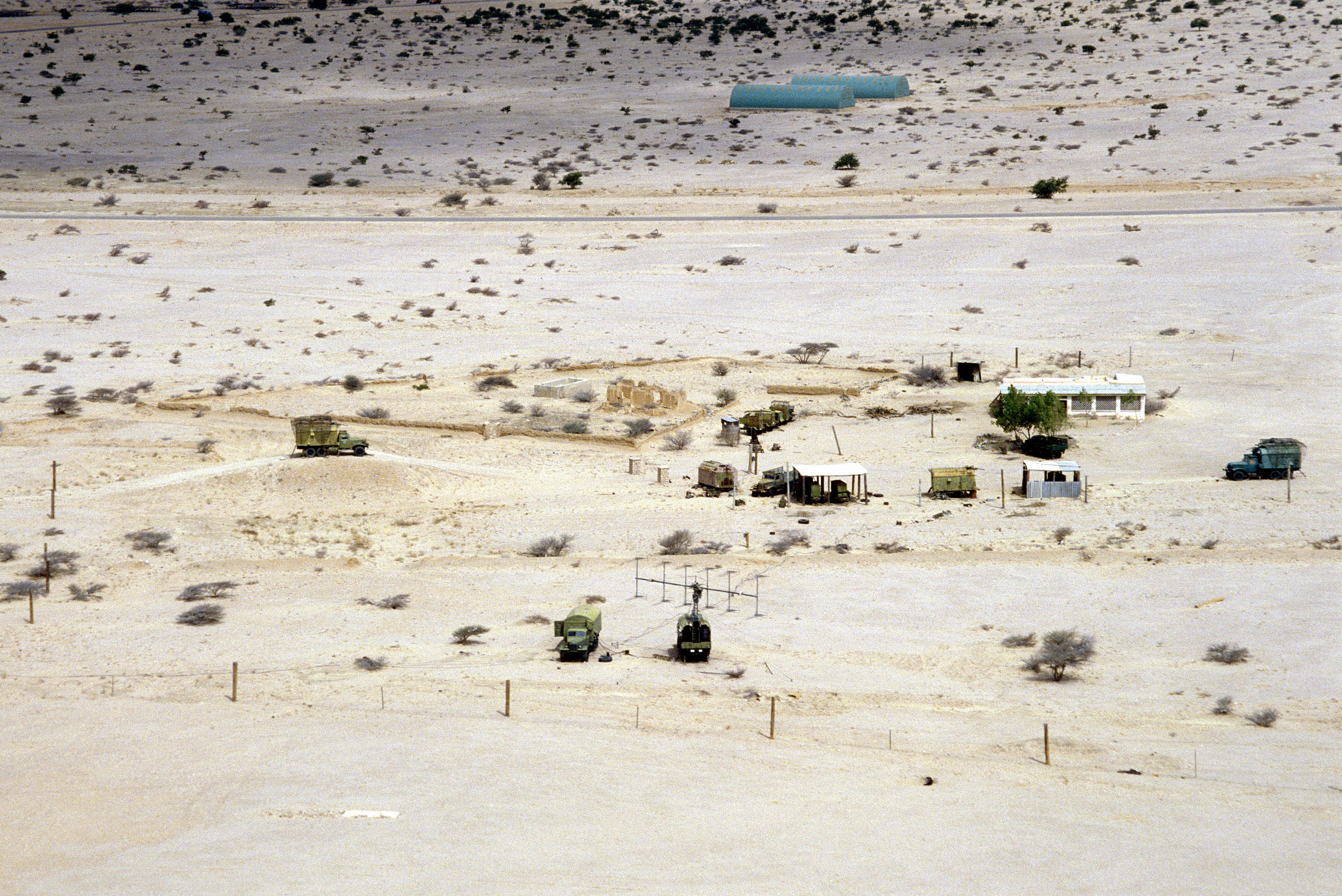
An aerial view of a radar installation operated by Somali troops at Berbera Airport. A Soviet-made P-12 early-warning radar is visible at bottom center. The photo was taken during Exercise Eastern Wind '83, the amphibious landing phase of Exercise Bright Star '83.

As of 1 June 1989, the International Institute for Strategic Studies estimated that the Army comprised four corps and 12 division headquarters. The IISS noted that these formations 'were in name only; below establishment in units, men, and equipment. Brigades were of battalion size.' In 1989-90 six military sectors, twelve divisions, four tank brigades, 45 mechanized and infantry brigades, 4 commando brigades, one surface-to-air missile brigade, three field artillery brigades, 30 field battalions [sic: probably field artillery battalions], and one air defence artillery battalion were listed. The armed forces declined in size from a possible high of 65,000 in early 1990 to about 10,000 later that year, due to desertions and battlefield defeats.

On 12–13 November 1989, a group of Hawiye officers and men belonging to the 4th Division at Galkayo, in Mudug, mutinied. General Barre's son, Maslah, led a force of Marehan clansmen to suppress the mutiny. Punishment was meted out to local Hawiye villages. In mid-November 1989, rebel forces briefly captured Galkayo. They reportedly seized significant quantities of military equipment at the 4th Division Headquarters, including tanks, 30 mobile anti-aircraft guns and rocket launchers. However, the rebels were unable to take most of this equipment so they incinerated it. Government forces thereafter launched massive reprisals against civilians within the 21st, 54th, 60th and 77th military sectors. The impacted towns and villages included Gowlalo, Dagaari, Sadeh Higlo, Banderadley, Galinsor, Wargalo, Do'ol, Halimo, Go'ondalay and Galkayo.

During the late 1980s, the Somali army suffered serious shortages of ammunition and the morale of various military formations reached a low. A 1989 strategic survey observed, "...morale has been reported to be low for lack of such vital items as ammunition and boots". Thus the SNA was also increasingly beset with mutinies of soldiers. By the end of 1989 new rebel groups were carrying out attacks in southern Somalia as the government was desperately seeking foreign military aid to remedy the SNA's supply situation, with little success. Fighting escalated between the SNA and Somali Patriotic Movement (SPM) in the south throughout the fall of 1989.

By mid-1990, USC insurgents had captured most of the towns and villages surrounding Mogadishu. On 8 November 1990, USC forces launched attack on the government garrison at Bulo-Burte, killing the commander. From 30 December 1990, there was a major upsurge in local violence in Mogadishu, and continuous fighting between government troops and USC insurgents. The next four weeks were marked by increasing rebel gains. On 27 January 1991, Siad Barre fled the capital for Kismayo, along with many of his supporters. This marked the culmination of the first phase of the civil war. By this time the Armed Forces had dissolved, split into clan factions. On 23 January 1992, the UN Security Council imposed an arms embargo via United Nations Security Council Resolution 733 to stop the flow of weapons to feuding militia groups. Much military equipment was left in situ, deteriorating, and was sometimes discovered and photographed by intervention forces in the early 1990s.

In May 2019, The New York Times reported that a former commander of the SNA's Fifth Brigade in northern Somalia had been found responsible for torture during the 1980s by a U.S. jury.

The United Nations became engaged in Somalia from early in 1991. UN personnel were withdrawn on several occasions during sporadic flare-ups of violence. A series of Security Council resolutions (733, 746) and diplomatic visits eventually helped impose a ceasefire between the two key factions, signed at the end of March 1992.

The United Nations Operation in Somalia I was established in April 1992 and ran until its duties were assumed by the Unified Task Force (UNITAF) mission in December 1992. Following the dissolution of UNITAF in May 1993, the subsequent UN mission in Somalia was known as United Nations Operation in Somalia II (UNOSOM II).

Some of the militias that were then competing for power saw UNOSOM II's presence as a threat. Gun battles took place in Mogadishu between the warring factions and UN peacekeepers. Among these was the Battle of Mogadishu in October 1993, part of an unsuccessful operation by U.S. troops to apprehend Somali National Alliance faction leader Mohamed Farrah Aidid. UN soldiers eventually withdrew altogether from the country on March 3, 1995, having incurred more significant casualties.

After UNOSOM II's departure in March 1995, clashes between factions became shorter, generally less intense, and more localized. This was in part due to the large-scale UN military intervention that had helped to curb the intense fighting between the major factions, who then began to focus on consolidating gains that they had made. The local peace and reconciliation initiatives that had been undertaken in the south-central part of the country between 1993 and 1995 also generally had a positive impact.

=== Twenty-first century ===
The Transitional National Government of Somalia (TNG) was established in April–May 2000 at a peace conference held in Arta, Djibouti. It was militarily and politically opposed by the Somalia Reconciliation and Restoration Council, which was formed by faction leaders including Hussein Mohamed Farrah Aidid and Mohamed Dhere. The TNG technically had all of the organs of a sovereign state, including executive and judicial structures as well as a standing army. But it was very weak; clan ties remained much more important than formal government structures.

It was reported on 7 November 2001, that TNG forces had seized control of Marka in Lower Shabelle. From 2002, Ismail Qasim Naji served as the TNG military chief. He was given the rank of Major General. The TNG's new army, made up of 90 women and 2,010 men, was equipped on 21 March 2002 with guns and armed wagons surrendered to the TNG by private parties in exchange for money, according to TNG officials. TNG president Abdulkassim Salat Hassan instructed the recruits to use the weaponry to "pacify Mogadishu and other parts of Somalia by fighting bandits, anarchists and all forces that operate for survival outside the law." But the TNG controlled only one part of Mogadishu; rival warlords controlled the remainder. Some TNG weapons were stolen and looted in late 2002.

Eventually the leadership of the SRRC and the TNG were reconciled, and the Transitional Federal Government (TFG) was formed in 2004 by Somali politicians in Nairobi. Abdullahi Yusuf Ahmed from Puntland was elected as President. The TFG later moved its temporary headquarters to Baidoa. President Yusuf requested that the African Union deploy in Somalia. Yusuf brought south his own militia from Puntland after fruitless appeals for military forces from the African Union. Along with the U.S. funding the ARPCT coalition, this alarmed many in south-central Somalia, and recruits flocked to the ascendant Islamic Courts Union (ICU).

A battle for Mogadishu followed in the first half of 2006 in which the ARPCT confronted the ICU. However, with local support, the ICU captured the city in June of the year. It then expanded its area of control in south-central Somalia over the following months, assisted militarily by Eritrea. In an effort at reconciliation, TFG and ICU representatives held several rounds of talks in Khartoum under the auspices of the Arab League. The two parties would not compromise and the meetings ended unsuccessfully. Hardline Islamists subsequently gained power within the ICU, prompting fears of a Talibanization of the movement.

In December 2006, Ethiopian troops entered Somalia to assist the TFG against the advancing Islamic Courts Union, initially winning the Battle of Baidoa. On 28 December 2006, Ethiopian forces recaptured the capital from the ICU. The offensive helped the TFG solidify its rule. Ethiopian and TFG forces forced the ICU from Ras Kamboni between 7–12 January 2007. They were assisted by at least two U.S. air strikes. On 8 January 2007, for the first time since taking office, President Ahmed entered Mogadishu from Baidoa, as the TFG moved its base to the national capital. President Ahmed brought his Puntland army chief with him, and Abdullahi Ali Omar became Somali chief of army on 10 February 2007.

On 20 January 2007, through United Nations Security Council Resolution 1744, the African Union Mission in Somalia (AMISOM) was formally authorised. Seven hundred Ugandan troops, earmarked for AMISOM, were landed at Mogadishu airport on 7–8 March 2007.

In Mogadishu, Hawiye residents resented the Islamic Courts Union's defeat. They distrusted the TFG, which was at the time dominated by the Darod clan, believing that it was dedicated to the advancement of Darod interests in lieu of the Hawiye. Additionally, they feared reprisals for massacres committed in 1991 in Mogadishu by Hawiye militants against Darod civilians, and were dismayed by Ethiopian involvement. Critics of the TFG likewise charged that its federalist platform was part of a plot by the Ethiopian government to keep Somalia weak and divided. During its first few months in the capital, the TFG was initially restricted to key strategic points, with the large northwestern and western suburbs controlled by Hawiye rebels. In March 2007, President Ahmed announced plans to forcibly disarm militias in the city. Extremist elements of the ICU, including Al-Shabaab then launched a wave of attacks against the TFG and Ethiopian troops. The allied forces in return mounted a heavy-handed response.

All of the warring parties were responsible for widespread violations of the laws of war, as civilians were caught in the ensuing crossfire. Insurgents reportedly deployed militants and established strongholds in heavily populated neighborhoods, launched mortar rounds from residential areas, and targeted public and private individuals for assassination and violence. TFG forces were alleged to have failed to properly warn civilians in combat zones, impeded relief efforts, plundered property, committed murder and violence, and mistreated detainees during mass arrests. Military, police and intelligence TFG personnel were implicated, as well as the private guards of senior TFG officials. Victims were often unable to identify TFG personnel, and confused militiamen aligned with TFG officials with TFG police officers and other state security personnel.

In mid-2008 the TFG decided to participate in peace talks with the Djibouti faction of the Islamist Alliance for the Re-liberation of Somalia (ARS-D). An agreement was signed on 19 August 2008. The current armed forces trace their origins to the weak alliance between the two factions.

In December 2008, the International Crisis Group reported:

Yusuf has built a largely subservient and loyal apparatus by putting his fellow Majerteen clansmen in strategic positions. The National Security Agency (NSA) under General Mohamed Warsame ("Darwish") and the so-called "Majerteen militia" units in the TFG army operate in parallel and often above other security agencies. Their exact number is hard to ascertain, but estimates suggest about 2,000. They are well catered for, well armed and often carry out counter-insurgency operations with little or no coordination with other security agencies. In the short term, this strategy may appear effective for the president, who can unilaterally employ the force essentially as he pleases. However, it undermines morale in the security services and is a cause of their high desertion rates.

Much of the problem building armed forces was the lack of functioning TFG government institutions:

Beyond the endemic internal power struggles, the TFG has faced far more serious problems in establishing its authority and rebuilding the structures of governance. Its writ has never extended much beyond Baidoa. Its control of Mogadishu is ever more contested, and it is largely under siege in the rest of the country. There are no properly functioning government institutions.

Also in December 2008, Human Rights Watch described the Somali National Army as the 'TFG's largely theoretical professional military force.' It said that 'where trained TFG military forces appear, 'they were identified by their victims as Ethiopian-trained forces, often acting in concert with ENDF (Ethiopian National Defense Force) forces or under the command of ENDF officers.' HRW also said that 'Human Rights Watch's own research has uncovered a pattern of violent abuses by TFG forces including widespread acts of murder, rape, looting, assault, arbitrary arrest and detention, and torture. Those responsible include police, military, and intelligence personnel as well as the personal militias of high-ranking TFG officials.'

HRW went on to say: 'The TFG has deployed a confusing array of security forces and armed militias to act on its behalf. Victims of the widespread abuses in which these forces have been implicated often have trouble identifying whether their attackers were TFG police officers, other TFG security personnel, or militias linked to TFG officials. Furthermore, formal command-and-control structures are to a large degree illusory. TFG security forces often wear multiple hats, acting on orders from their formal superiors one day, as clan militias another day, and as autonomous self-interested armed groups the next.'

In April 2009, donors at a UN-sponsored conference pledged over $250 million to help improve security. The funds were earmarked for AMISOM and supporting Somalia's security, including the build-up of a security force of 6,000 members as well as an augmented police force of 10,000 men. In June 2009, the Somali military received 40 tonnes worth of arms and ammunition from the U.S. government to assist it in combating the insurgency.

In November 2009, the European Union announced its intention to train two Somali battalions (around 2,000 troops), which would complement other training missions and bring the total number of better-trained Somali soldiers to 6,000. The two battalions were expected to be ready by August 2011.

In November 2010, a new technocratic government was elected to office. In its first 50 days in office, the new administration completed its first monthly payment of stipends to government fighters. It was the first of many Somali administrations to announce plans for a full biometric register for the security forces. While it aimed to complete the biometric register within four months, little further was reported. By August 2011, AMISOM and Somali forces had managed to capture all of Mogadishu from Al-Shabaab.

Powerful vested interests and corrupt commanders were, as of February 2011, the largest obstacle to reforming the army. Some newly delivered weaponry was sold by officers. The International Crisis Group also said that AMISOM's efforts at assisting in formalizing the military's structure and providing training to the estimated 8,000 SNA were problematic. Resistance continued to the establishment of an effective chain of command, logical military formations and a credible troop roster. Although General Mohamed Gelle Kahiye, the respected former army chief, attempted to instill reforms, he was marginalized and eventually dismissed.

In August 2011, as part of the European Union Training Mission Somalia (EUTM Somalia), 900 Somali soldiers graduated from the Bihanga Military Training School in the Ibanda District of Uganda. 150 personnel from the EU took part in the training process, which trained around 2,000 Somali troops per year. In May 2012, 603 Somali army personnel completed training at the facility. They were the third batch of Somali nationals to be trained there under the auspices of EUTM Somalia. In total, the EU mission had trained 3,600 Somali soldiers, before permanently transferring all of its advisory, mentoring and training activities to Mogadishu in December 2013.

In October 2011, following a weekend preparatory meeting between Somali and Kenyan military officials in the town of Dhobley, the Kenya Defence Forces launched an attack across the border against Al-Shabaab, aiming for Kismayo. In early June 2012, Kenyan troops were formally integrated into AMISOM.

In January 2012, Somali government forces and their AMISOM allies launched offensives on Al-Shabaab's last foothold on the northern outskirts of Mogadishu. The following month, Somali forces fighting alongside AMISOM seized Baidoa from the insurgent group. By June 2012, the allied forces had also captured El Bur, Afgooye, and Balad. Progress by the Kenya Army from the border towards Kismayo was slow, but Afmadow was also reported captured on 1 June 2012.

=== Creation of Federal Government ===
The Federal Government of Somalia was established in August/September 2012. On 6 March 2013, United Nations Security Council Resolution 2093 was passed. The resolution lifted the purchase ban on light weapons for a provisional period of one year, but retained restrictions on the procurement of heavy arms such as surface-to-air missiles and artillery.

On 13 March 2013, Dahir Adan Elmi was appointed Chief of Army at a transfer ceremony in Mogadishu, where he replaced Abdulkadir Sheikh Dini. Abdirizak Khalif Elmi was appointed as Elmi's new Deputy Chief of Army.

In August 2013, Federal Government of Somalia officials and Jubaland regional representatives signed an agreement in Addis Ababa. All Jubaland security personnel (principally the Ras Kamboni Brigades) would be integrated into the Somali National Army. This did not occur. No SNA force was established in the Juba Valley area until July 2015.

In November 2013, the United Nations Support Office for AMISOM (UNSOA) was directed to support the SNA. They were to better supply a force of 10,900 Somalis to participate in joint operations with AMISOM against al-Shabaab. SNA personnel would initially be trained by AMISOM. When specific UN requirements were passed, including Human Rights and Due Diligence training, approved SNA personnel would begin to receive food, shelter, fuel, water and medical support.

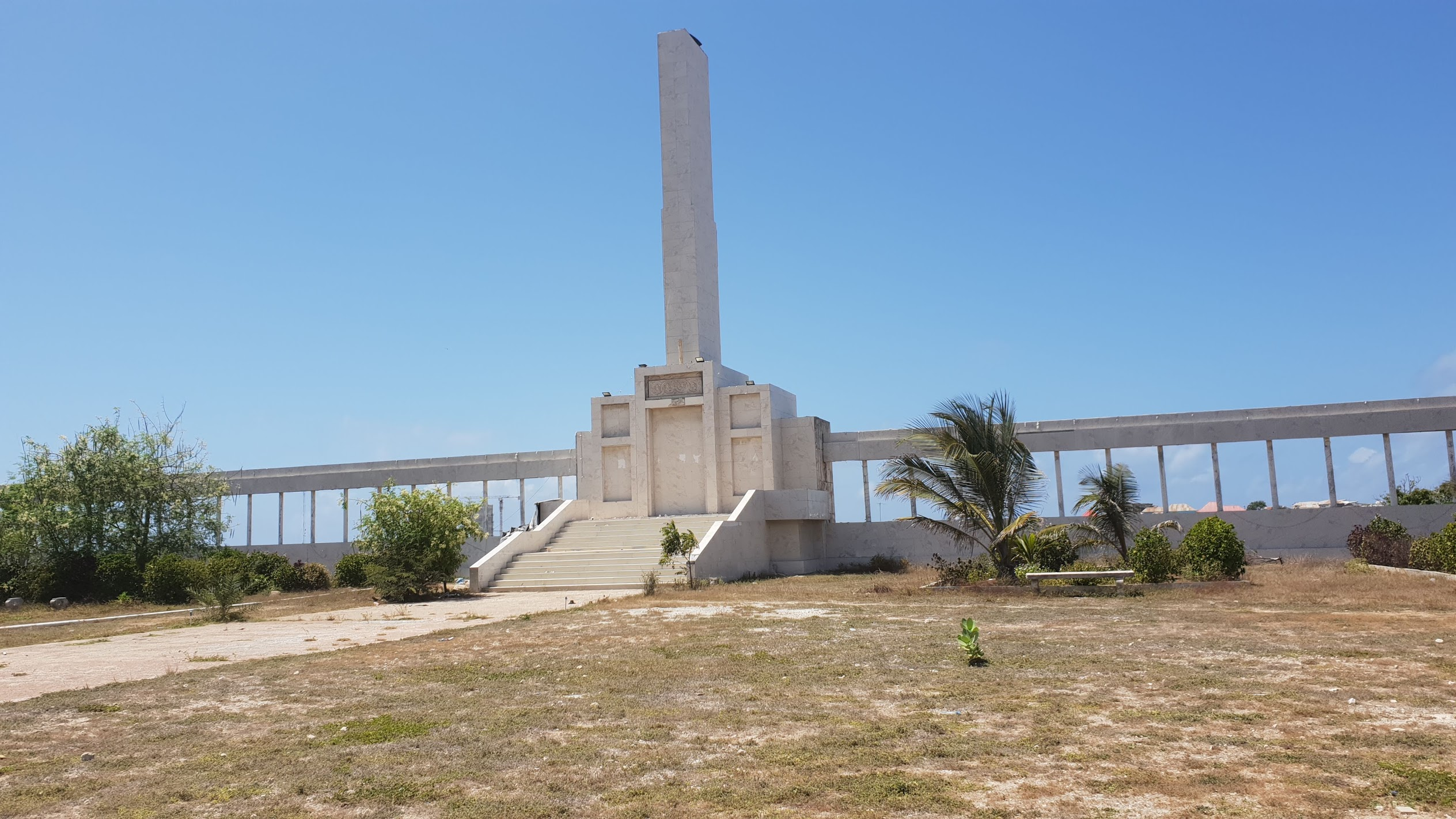
Tomb of The Unknown Soldier (Flag hasn't been repainted) c. 2018

In February 2014, EUTM Somalia began its first "Train the Trainers" programme at the Jazeera Training Camp in Mogadishu. 60 Somali National Army soldiers that had been previously trained by EUTM in Uganda would take part in a four-week refresher course on infantry techniques and procedures, including international humanitarian law and military ethics. The training would be conducted by 16 EU trainers. Following the course's completion, the Somali soldiers would be qualified as instructors to then train SNA recruits, with mentoring provided by EUTM Somalia personnel. A team of EUTM Somalia advisors also started offering strategic advice to the Somali Ministry of Defence and General Staff.

In early March 2014, Somali security forces and AMISOM troops launched another operation against Al-Shabaab. According to Prime Minister Abdiweli Sheikh Ahmed, the government subsequently launched stabilization efforts in the newly liberated areas, which included Rab Dhuure, Hudur, Wajid and Burdhubo. However, there were continuing concerns that not enough was being done to revitalise and secure the newly liberated areas. By 26 March, ten towns within the month had been liberated, including Qoryoley and El Buur. UN Special Representative for Somalia Nicholas Kay described the military advance as the most significant and geographically extensive offensive since AU troops began operations in 2007.

In July 2014, the governments of the United States and France announced that they would start providing training to the SNA. According to U.S. Defense Department officials, American military advisers are also stationed in Somalia.

In August 2014, the Somali government launched Operation Indian Ocean. On 1 September 2014, a U.S. drone strike killed Al-Shabaab leader Moktar Ali Zubeyr. U.S. authorities hailed the raid as a major symbolic and operational loss for Al-Shabaab, and the Somali government offered a 45-day amnesty to all moderate members of the militant group.

In September 2014, 20 Somali federal soldiers began training courses in Djibouti.

In October 2014, Federal Government officials signed an agreement with Puntland, which said that the Federal and Puntland authorities would work to form an integrated national army. In April 2015, another bilateral treaty stipulated that Puntland would contribute 3,000 troops to the Somali National Army. This did not occur, and FGS forces and Puntland forces remain separate.

In March 2015, the Federal Cabinet agreed to establish a new commission to nationalize and integrate security forces. In April 2015, the Commission on Regional Militia Integration presented its plan for the formal integration of regional forces.

On 26 March 2015, the Defence Working Group under the New Deal structure held its first meeting since November 2014. Discussions focused on the Guulwade (Victory) Plan of the Federal Government, developed with technical assistance from UNSOM. The plan outlined the SNA’s arms and equipment needs for improved joint operations, consistent with the AMISOM concept of operations, and laid out a framework for longer-term development of the national army. The plan was presented by the Ministry of Defence and endorsed at the meeting of the Working Group on Peacebuilding and State-building Goal 2 (security) in Mogadishu on 23 April 2015. However, the plan's long list of equipment requirements did not attract significant donor support, and it was essentially shelved.

In 2016 The Economist reported that the SNA did not exist as a cohesive force due to high rates of desertions and many soldiers being primarily loyal to clan leaders rather than the government.

== Somali National Army from 2008 ==
=== Training and facilities ===
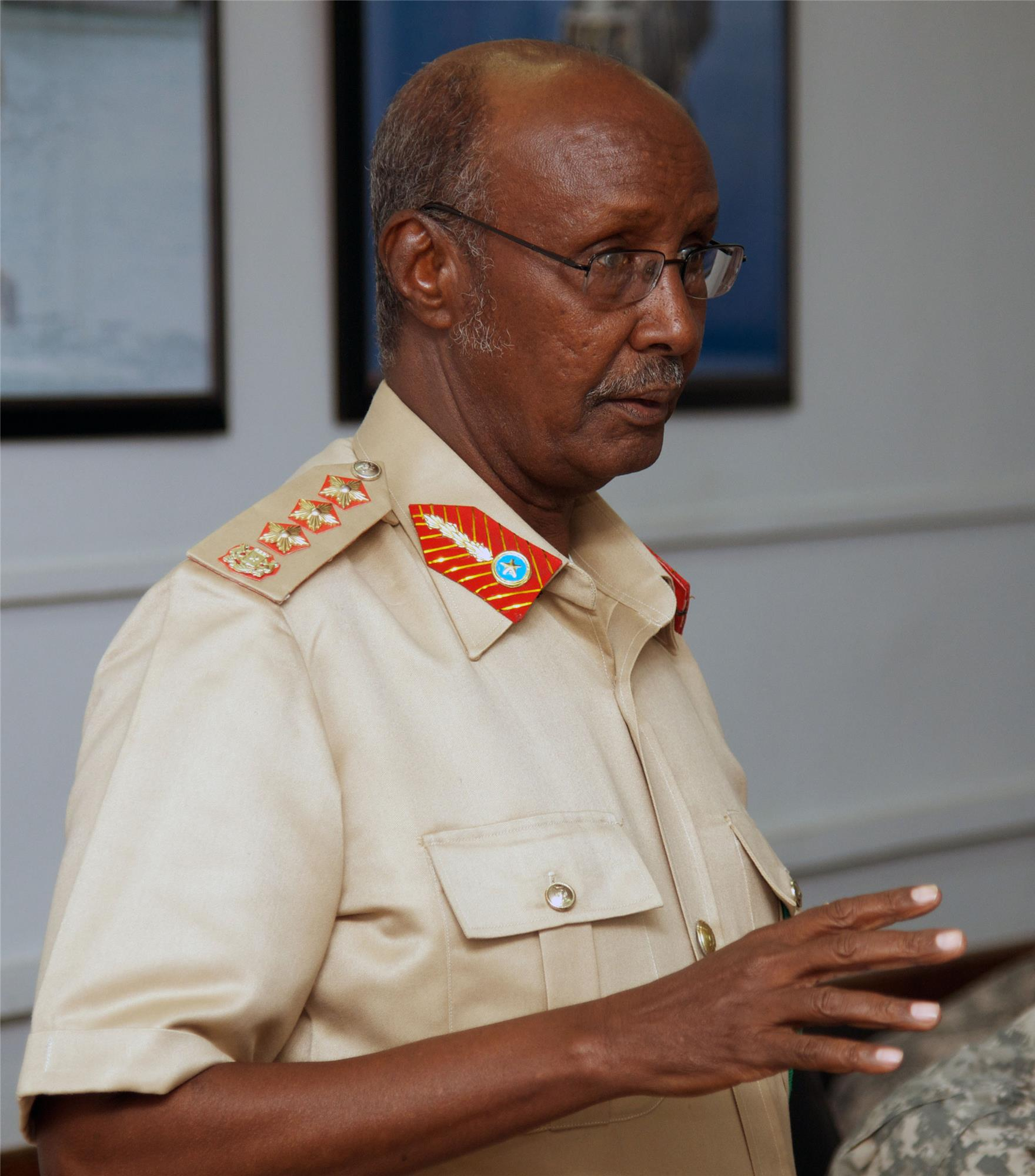
Then Brigadier General Dahir Adan Elmi, Chief of Defence Force, while meeting with Commander, Combined Joint Task Force – Horn of Africa in 2013

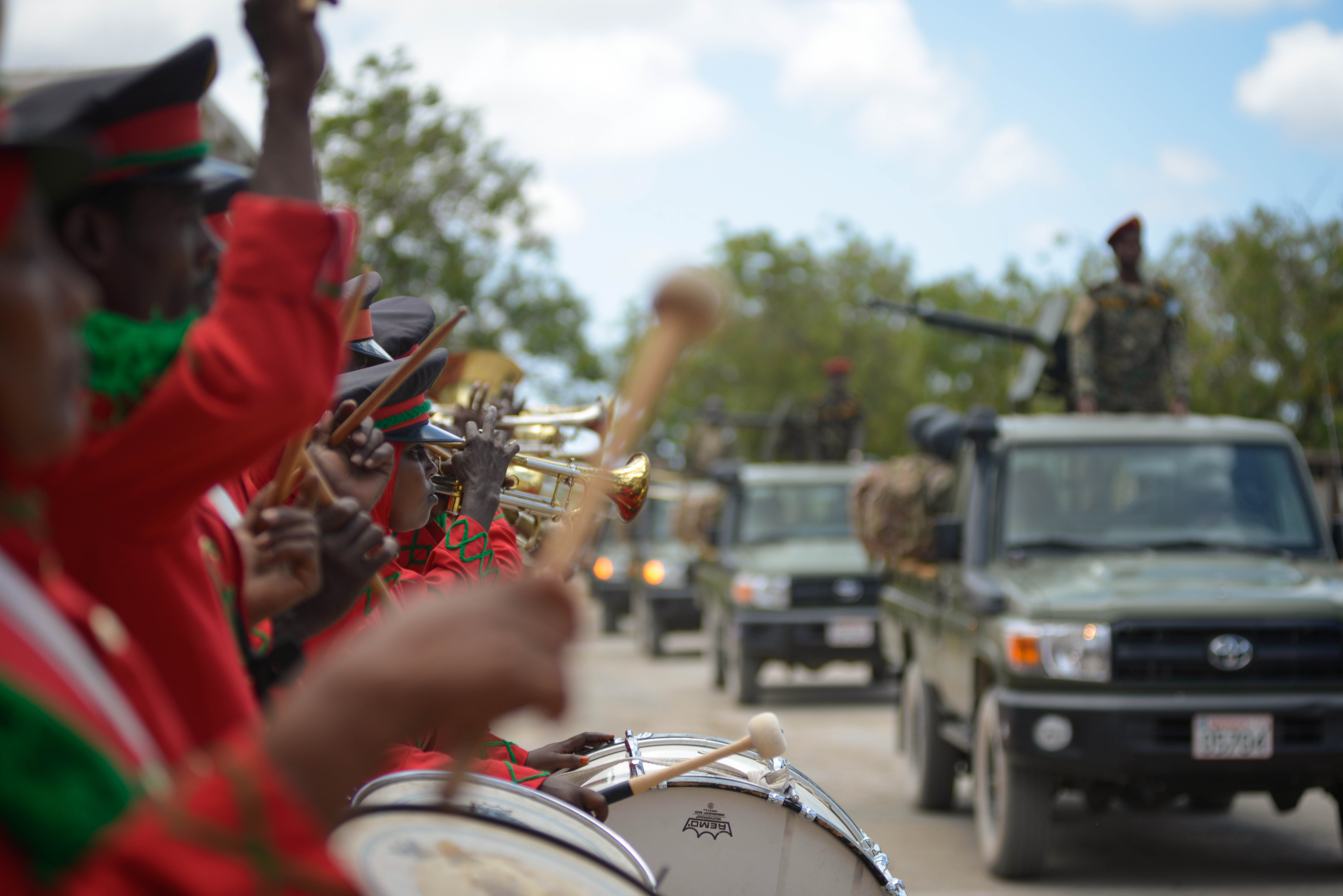
SNAF Parade on Somali Armed Forces day in 2016

In September 2011, President Sharif Sheikh Ahmed laid the foundation for a new military camp in the Jazeera District of Mogadishu. The $3.2 million construction project was funded by the EU and was expected to take six months to complete.

In June 2013, Egyptian engineers arrived to build new headquarters for the Somalia Ministry of Defence.

In February 2014, it was announced that Somalia had held military training inside the country for the first time (since the late 1980s). Chief of Staff Brigadier General Elmi said that there were "some hospitals that have a special agreement with the government where the injured soldiers are admitted, but there is no hospital that is strictly for the armed forces. There is a hospital that used to belong to the military, but it needs funding to operate."

In May 2015, President Hassan Sheikh Mohamud officially opened a new training camp in Mogadishu. Construction began in 2014 in conjunction with the government of the United Arab Emirates. Situated in the Hodan district, it was one of several new military training sites in the country.

=== Strength and units ===
In April 2011, 1,000 recruits completed training in Uganda as a part of the agreement with the EU destined for the newly forming Brigades 4, Brigade 5 and Brigade 6. With a post-training drop-out rate of around 10%, the vast majority of the EUTM trainees continued to serve in the SNA after their period abroad. Brigades 5 and 6 have fought against Al-Shabaab including in Mogadishu and Afgoye.

In 2013, divisions, effectively serving as area commands, began to be reformed: initially Division 60 at Baidoa (1 July 2013), later joined by Division 21 at Dhusamareb (30 August 2013). In the Kismayo/Jubaland area, after Ahmed Madobe had established himself, commanders from the Mogadishu area were somewhat isolated by differing clan connections. Yet they were technically heads of SNA Division 43 (Somalia): in reality more of a "paper" area command than a division. Then on 27 July 2015 a swearing in ceremony took place for 1,517 new SNA fighters from Lower Juba and Kismayo, and they formed multi-clan battalions. Very little support or even no support was provided to this group, located at the old Kismayo Airport, in the twelve months to February 2016. By January 2016 it appeared that up to 500 had drifted away, dropping out of the integration process.

Also established by 2014 was Division "12 April", supervising Somali troops in the areas of AMISOM Sectors 1 and 5 around Mogadishu. In March 2013 there were technically six brigades around Mogadishu, but their motivation to fight al-Shabaab in an organised fashion, as opposed to operating as clan militia, was doubtful. The six brigades were as of July 2013 largely composed of officers from various Hawiye sub-clans, with some Marehan-Darod and minorities also present. Five brigades primarily consisted of Abgaal, Murosade and Hawadle soldiers. Brigade 3 over the same period comprised 840 fighters, most of whom belong to the Hawiye-Habar Gidir/Ayr clan. The brigade was around 30% to 50% smaller in size than the other five brigades in the wider Mogadishu area. Led by General Mohamed Roble Jimale 'Gobale,' it occupied areas in Lower Shabelle, including Merka, and along the Afgoye corridor. The UN Monitoring Group reported that many Brigade 3 fighters had been drawn from militias controlled by Yusuf Mohamed Siyaad 'Indha Adde', a close associate of Jimale and the former Eritrean-backed chief of defence for the Alliance for the Re-liberation of Somalia-Asmara. Gobale was killed in a suspected Al-Shabaab attack on 18 September 2016. Brigade 3's primary focus became "the domination of the valuable riverine land and its businesses for financial gain. In the process, the local people, often from minority clans such as the Biimaal, were constantly oppressed, with numerous atrocities committed," including arbitrary torture of civilians.

In Hiraan by mid-2014 Brigade 10 was active, centred on Beledweyne and made up mostly of the Hawaadle.

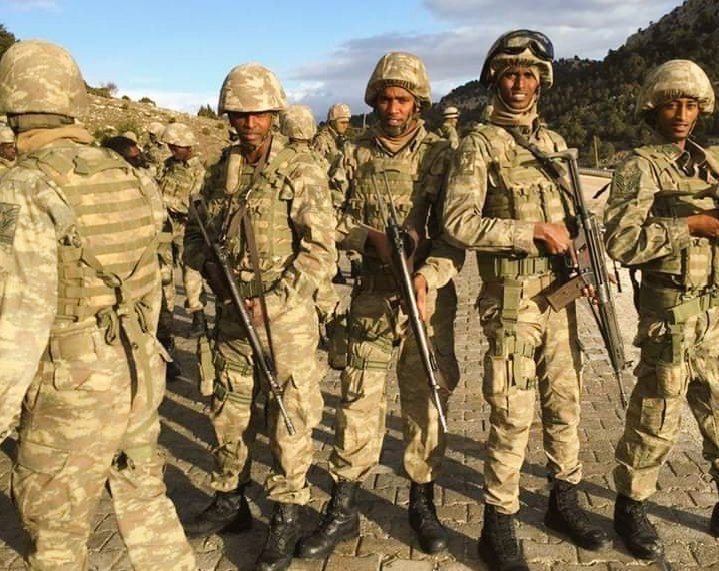
Somali military personnel in Turkey for military training in 2018

In February 2014 Chief of Staff Elmi said that a new biometric registration system had been created for the SAF, whereby each person would be photographed and fingerprinted. By the end of 2014, 17,000 national army soldiers and police officers had been registered for the new biometric remuneration system. 13,829 SNA soldiers and 5,134 Somali Police Force officials were biometrically registered in the system as of May 2015.

As of May–June 2014, numbers were reportedly estimated at 20,000 (including around 1,500 female).

In February 2014, the Federal Government concluded a six-month training course for the first commandos, the initial Danab company (Somali: "Lightning"), since 1991. Training was carried out by Bancroft Global Development, a U.S. private military contractor, paid by AMISOM which is then reimbursed by the U.S. State Department. The aim was to create a mixed-clan unit. The Danab unit was established at Baledogle Airfield, in Walaweyn District, Lower Shabelle. The training of the first unit began in October 2013, with 150 recruits. By July 2014, training of the second unit was underway. The training is geared toward both urban and rural environments, and was aimed at preparing the soldiers for all types of modern military operations. Elmi said that a total of 570 recruits were expected to have completed training by U.S. security personnel by the end of 2014.

In April 2015, the United States government also funded the payment of 9,495 army allowances.

In March 2023, following on from an agreement in 2017, the southern Somali Presidents agreed to increase theoretical troop numbers.

=== Agreements ===
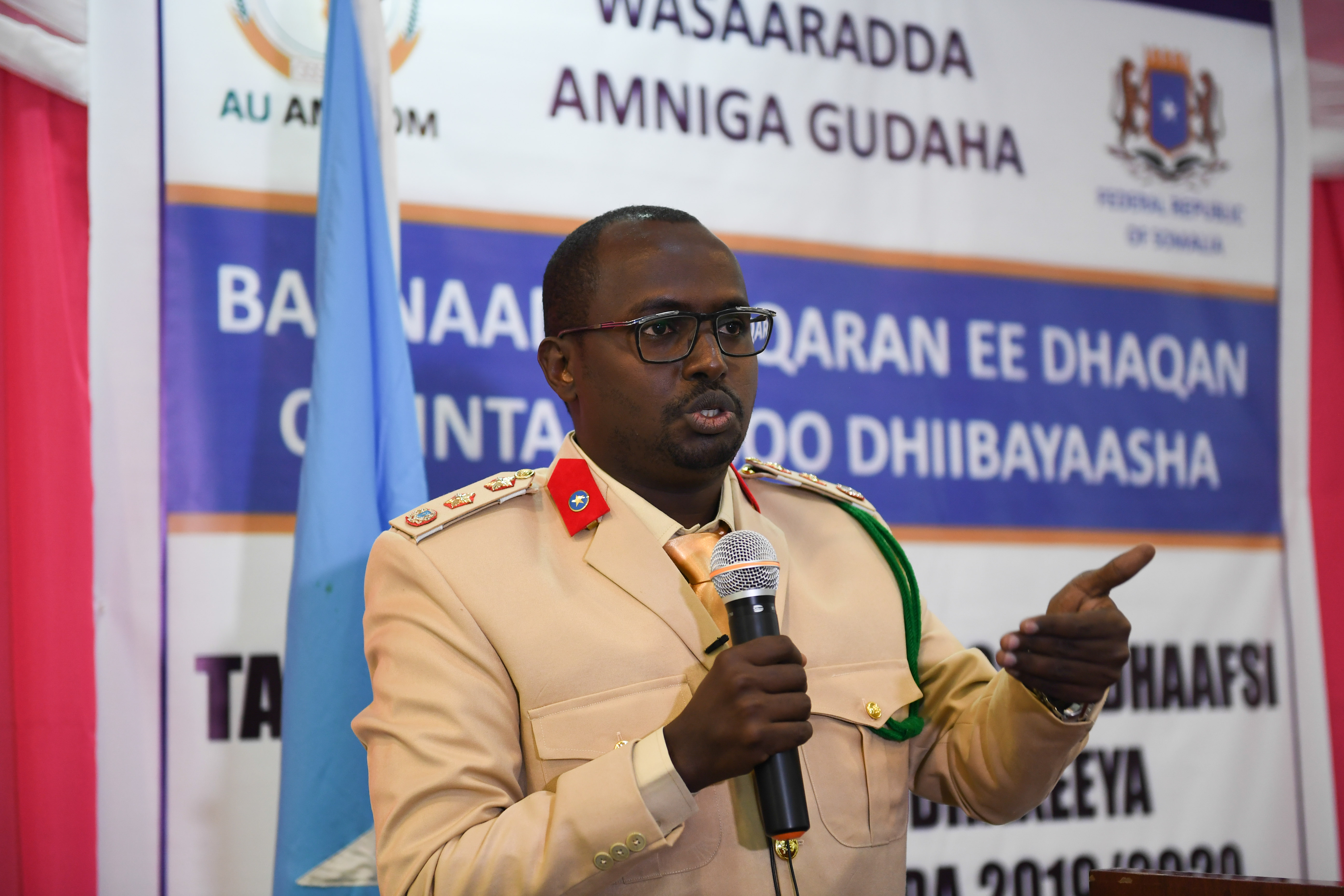
Chief of the Somali Military Tribunal, Colonel Hassan Ali Nur Shuute in 2019, in formal service dress

In February 2012, Somali Prime Minister Abdiweli Mohamed Ali and Italian Defence Minister Gianpaolo Di Paola agreed that Italy would assist the Somali Armed Forces as part of the National Security and Stabilization Plan. In November 2014, the Federal Parliament approved a new defense and cooperation treaty with Italy. The agreement included training and equipping of the army by Italy.

In November 2014, Somalia signed a military cooperation agreement with the United Arab Emirates.

Somalia signed military cooperation agreements with Turkey in May 2010, February 2014, and January 2015. In early 2016 another agreement was signed to open Camp TURKSOM in Mogadishu, at which Turkish Armed Forces officers were to train Somali recruits. Over 1,500 Somalis were to be trained by 200 Turkish personnel. A military school in Somalia to train officers was also planned.

In February 2024, Somalia made an agreement with Turkey, 10 years long, under which Ankara will help defend Somalia's coastline and provide training and assistance to the Somali Navy. This agreement is complemented with an oil and gas exploitation deal, the details of which are opaque.

=== Disappearances of Somali soldiers ===
In January 2021, the families of 370 Somali soldiers who were sent to Eritrea for training began protesting in Mogadishu, due to loss of contact with their relatives since November 2019. The parents of the soldiers called on President Mohamed Abdullahi Mohamed "Faarmajo" to give them information as to their sons' whereabouts after allegations of involvement in the Tigray War. On May 23, 2022, the last day of his presidency, Farmajo confirmed that 5,000 soldiers have concluded their training in Eritrea in mid 2021, saying that their return was delayed because of the election process.

In December 2022, Somali National Army troops began returning from Eritrea back to Somalia. Voice of America reported that it was not able to find any evidence that the soldiers had been ever deployed to Tigray. Various sources have vindicated the Somali governments position that no evidence exists of SNA involvement. In January 2023, the National Security Advisor reiterated that Somali troops training in Eritrea had never participated in the Tigray war and observed that all troops had returned to Somalia.

== Somali Air Force ==
A Somali Aeronautical Corps (in Italian: "Corpo di Sicurezza della Somalia") was established in the 1950s during the trusteeship period prior to independence. Original equipment included six to eight North American P-51D Mustangs. It grew to become the Somali Air Force, with Italian aid, in the early 1960s. The initial equipment of the SAF included Douglas C-47s, which remained in service until 1968, and a variety of small transports and trainers. However, all the surviving Mustangs were returned to Italy before Somalia gained its independence in June 1960. The air force operated most of its aircraft from bases near Mogadishu, Hargeisa and Galkayo. The Somali Air Defence Force, equipped with Soviet S-75 Dvina (SA-2) missiles, anti-aircraft guns, and early warning radars was in existence by September 1974. By 1987 it had seven anti-aircraft gun & missile brigades, and one radar brigade, numbering about 3,500 personnel. In June 1983, the government took delivery of nine Hawker Hunters and four Islander aircraft from the United Arab Emirates at the port in Mogadishu.

By January 1991 the air force was in ruins. In 2012, Italy offered to help rebuild the air force. In 2016 the air force was described as 150 retirees from the Siad Barre era, without any aircraft. Other late 2016-early 2017 figures from the SJPER said 170. The air force's personnel were located in a camp on the outskirts of Mogadishu International Airport.

"In December 2021, Turkey provided the FGS with Baykar Bayraktar TB2 drones. Operating out of Mogadishu, they were piloted by Turkish personnel and used for reconnaissance in support of Gorgor troops until late 2022 when some were armed and began conducting strikes against al-Shabaab targets." The Turkish Army Aviation Command supervises most overland UAV operations for the Turkish Armed Forces.

"The United Nations Support Office in Somalia (UNSOS) has supported the African Union Transition Mission in Somalia (ATMIS) to acquire three helicopters from the Burundi National Defence Forces (BNDF)." These have included Mi-8s and Bell 412 helicopters.

In March 2023 it was reported that "Somalia's air force is not functional. ..although the Somali Air Force has no aircraft or maintenance crews, it has sent some pilots for training in Turkey."

Scramble in the Netherlands reported in August 2023 that Somalia had received two ex-Italian Agusta-Bell AB 412 helicopters.

In March 2025 Turkey sent three TAI/AgustaWestland T129 ATAK helicopters to Somalia for anti-insurgency operations against Harakat al-Shabaab al-Mujahideen. An additional three helicopters were sent to Somalia in June 2025. On November 3, 2025, "Garowe Online" carried a report quoting unnamed Turkish officials about the presence of Turkish-built T129 ATAK attack helicopters in Somalia. The officials commented after repeated reports on social media that Somalia had taken ownership of T129 attack helicopters. They said the aircraft seen at the ceremony remained under Turkish control; were not part of the Somali National Army's inventory; and were used for training and operational purposes by Turkish personnel stationed in Somalia.

In February 2026, reports appeared that the Somali Air Force was in talks to acquire 24 CAC/PAC JF-17 Thunder Block III fighter aircraft.

== Somali Navy ==
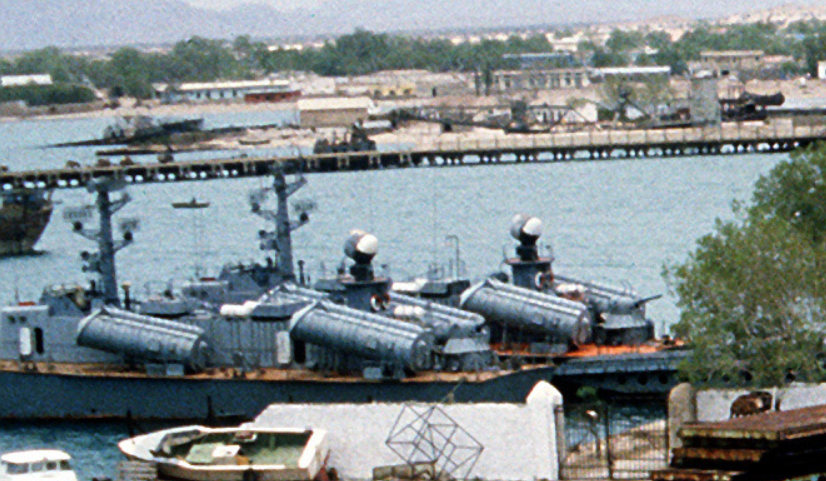
Two Somali Osa-class missile boats during the 1983 Operation Bright Star

The Somali Navy was formed after independence in 1960. Prior to 1991, it participated in several joint exercises with the United States, Great Britain and Canada. It disintegrated during the beginning of the civil war in Somalia, from the late 1980s.

Admiral Farah Ahmed Omar told a New Yorker reporter in December 2009 that the navy was 'practically nothing' at the time, though five hundred new recruits were in training. On 30 June 2012, the United Arab Emirates announced a contribution of $1 million toward enhancing Somalia's naval security. Boats, equipment and communication gear necessary for the rebuilding of the coast guard would be bought. A central operations naval command was also planned to be set up in Mogadishu.

== Equipment ==
Under the Barre regime, the Soviet Union and Yugoslavia supplied large amounts of military equipment, until the break in relations in 1977. Other reported suppliers included Czechoslovakia; East Germany; North Korea; and Romania.

In the 2020s the most important suppliers include the United States; Turkey, especially for the "Gorgor" special forces; and the People's Republic of China has also donated equipment. Italian helicopters entered service from 2023.

Among firearms associated with the Somali National Army and reported by Jane's Infantry Weapons 2009/10 were Soviet TT pistols, British Sterling submachine guns; Heckler & Koch G3 and Belgian FN FAL assault rifles, U.S. M14 rifles, Soviet RPD machine guns; Soviet RPK machine guns; Soviet RP-46 machine guns; French AA-52 machine guns; Belgian FN MAG machine guns; Soviet DShK heavy machine guns; U.S. M2 Browning .50 cal heavy machine guns; and U.S. M79 grenade launchers and Soviet RPG-2 grenade launchers.

In May 2012, over thirty-three vehicles were donated by the U.S. government to the SNA. The vehicles include 16 Magirus trucks, 4 Hilux pickups, 6 Land Cruiser pickups, 1 water tanker, and 6 water trailers. On 9 April 2013, the U.S. government approved the provision of defense articles and services by the American authorities to the Somali Federal Government. It handed over 15 vehicles to the new Commandos in March 2014.

In April 2013, Djibouti presented the SNA with 15 armoured military vehicles. The equipment was part of a larger consignment of 25 military trucks and 25 armoured military vehicles. The same month, the Italian government handed over 54 armored and personnel carrier vehicles to the army at a ceremony in Mogadishu.

As of April 2015, the Ministry of Defence's Guulwade Plan identifies the equipment and weaponry requirements of the army.

Thirteen ACMAT Bastion APCs were planned to be transferred in 2016, supplied via the U.S. Department of Defense. Yet in 2018, an industry source explained to Jane's that none had actually been supplied.

In 2019, Navistar Defence was awarded a multimillion dollar contract to supply Somalia with multiple 6x6 transport and recovery trucks. In 2021, the United States supplied the Somali Army with six Puma M36 Mk 6 armoured personnel carriers, a variant of the PUMA M26-15.

== Chief of Defence Force ==
Beret and cap badge for all officers of the Somali Armed Forces

Barre became Chief of Staff, and then SAF commander; General Mohammad Ali Samatar became Chair, Peace and Security Committee, in December 1974 while remaining commandant of the Army and Secretary of State for Defence, while Brigadier General Abdalla Mohamed Fail was Samatar's deputy, and First Vice-Commandant of the Army; Samatar was Commander-in-Chief in 1976; Maslah Mohammed Siad Barre became SNA Commander-in-Chief in 1989; Brigadier General Mohammed Said Hersi Morgan became commander-in-chief on 25 November 1990.

From the mid-2010s, the title of the senior military officer has been Chief of Defence Force.

== Ranks, uniform, and camouflage ==
In July 2014, General Dahir Adan Elmi announced the completion of a review of the Somali National Army ranks. The SNA in conjunction with the Ministry of Defense is also slated to standardize the martial ranking system and eliminate any unauthorized promotions as part of a broader reform.

Officers

Rank group	General / flag officers			Senior officers			Junior officers
Somali National Army
Somali National Army	Sareeye guud	Sareeye gaas	Sareeye guuto	Gashaanle sare	Gashaanle dhexe	Gashaanle	Dhamme	Laba xídígle	Xídígle

Enlisted

Rank group	Senior NCOs					Junior NCOs		Enlisted
Somali National Army								No insignia
Somali National Army	Musharax sarkaal	Sadex xarígle	Laba xarígle	Xarígle	Sadex alífle	Laba alífle	Alífle	Dable

=== Uniform and camouflage ===
Somalia's Army had very little variation in their uniforms since their inception, the most common camouflage is woodland camouflage but in recent years, Somalia has had access to digital camouflage as well. Somalia's more common service uniform consists of fatigues and coloured berets on which rank insignia can be displayed and coloured gorget patches, shoulder patches that display their unit although there is a more formal variant that resembles British Service Dress but is khaki in colour.
