= El Atful =

Hamlet in Middle Shabelle, Somalia

- Hamlet
- Location in Somalia
- Coordinates: 3°03′10″N 45°08′17″E
- Country: Somalia
- State: Hirshabelle
- Region: Middle Shabelle
- District: El Gambole
- Time zone: UTC+3 (EAT)

El Atful is a hamlet in Middle Shabelle, Somalia located approximately 3.05297°N 45.13812°E and lies at an elevation of about 110 metres above sea level. It is situated near Gambole and Boghon Gaad. El Atful is also identified in the Humanitarian Atlas's Somalia administrative mapping system within the Jowhar District area. The locality is additionally listed as El Atful, Jowhar, with an elevation of approximately 110 metres.

== Geography ==
El Atful is situated in the agricultural and pastoral landscape of the Shabelle River valley. Modern geographic records place the settlement at approximately 3.05° north latitude and 45.14° east longitude, at an elevation of about 110 metres.

The locality is shown on a OCHA reference map as El Atful (Y03-001). The map identifies the settlement layer as derived from UNDP Somalia data and places El Atful near Bogon Gad in the northern part of the district.

Modern geographic records also place El Atful near Gambole and other settlements and water points in the surrounding Shabelle valley.

== Historical references ==
The name Atful is documented in historical sources predating modern geographic databases. A 1924 account of the Italian colonial disarmament campaign in the Upper Shabelle region records the capture of Hagi Hassan Bersane at the wells of Atful (pozzi di Atful) on 4 April 1924. The account places the incident within the Italian military operations undertaken in the Mahaddei area during the disarmament of local communities. A contemporary Italian-language newspaper article from January 1954 provides a further reference to El Atful. In an article discussing wells and water sources in Somalia, Nicolò Cantale described a series of places along the right bank of the Shabelle River between Bulo Burte and Mahaday, including Mukayle, Ceel Warre, El Bio Nef, El Dem, El Ano, El Gambole and El Atful. The article emphasized the importance of wells as points around which settlements and routes developed.Cantale, Nicolò (21 January 1954). "El Scek Ibrahim". Il Corriere della Somalia. The 1924 reference to Atful and the 1954 reference to El Atful provide independent historical attestations of closely related forms of the name.
