= Dheriyow =

Dheriyow Ceel Dhariyow
- Village
- Interactive map of Dheriyow
- Coordinates: 3.66587°N 44.90105°E
- Country: Somalia
- Federal member state: Hirshabelle
- Region: Hiiraan
- District: Bulo Burti District
- Elevation: 287 m (942 ft)

Dheriyow (also spelled Dhariyow and Dharyiow) is a village in Hiran, Somalia. Situated in the Buloburde District area, and approximately 60 kilometres west of Bulo Burte. The village is recorded in Somali government, humanitarian, agricultural and geographic sources under the names Dheriyow and Dhariyow. geographic record places Dhariyow at approximately 3.66587°N, 44.90105°E and at an elevation of about 287 metres. An OCHA reference map of the Hiraan region also identifies Dhariyow as a mapped locality, using the map reference J31-001.

== See also ==
Dabbad

Mukayle
