= Buq Aqable =

City in Hiran Region, Hirshabelle, Somalia

Buq Aqable Buqda Aqable (Somali)
- City
- Buq Aqable Centre

- Location in Somalia
- Coordinates: 4°3′28″N 45°15′27″E
- Country: Somalia
- State: Hirshabelle
- Region: Hiran
- District: Buq Aqable
- Founded: 16th century
- Elevation: 110 m (360 ft)

Population (2021)
  - Urban: 60,000
  - Rural: 22,000
- Time zone: UTC+3 (EAT)

Buq Aqable (Somali: Buq Aqable or Buqda Caqable; Italian: Bugda Acable) is a town in the western Hiiraan region of Somalia and the capital of Buq Aqable District.

The town located at approximately 4°3'28"N 45°15'27"E. about 75 km south of Beledweyne and 45 km from Buloburde.

1921 Italian census recorded Bugda Acable as settlement. In 1924, the Italian anthropologist Nello Puccioni visited Bugda Acable during an expedition from Mogadishu through the Uebi Scebeli valley toward Lugh.

A 1931 census listed Bugda Acable among the settlements associated with the Galgial group, the name used in Italian records for the Gaalje'el. The census also listed several Galgial subdivisions and other localities in the same area. and also document Galgial people at Bugda Acable. An italian anthropological study identified a religious figure at Bugda Acable as belonging to the Abtisame (Galgiàl) clan.

In the post-colonial period, Bugda Acable was included in educational planning for Bulo Burti District. A Somali government decree issued in 1965 also established a detached civil judicial section there.

June 2023, Hirshabelle State cabinet approved Buq Aqable and five other localities to district level.

== Administrative divisions ==
Dabbad El Warre Haraale, Aqabley, Haji Gabow,

== History ==
In March 2014, Somali Armed Forces assisted by AMISOM troops captured the town from Al-Shabaab. The offensive was part of an intensified military operation by the allied forces to remove the insurgent group from the remaining areas in southern Somalia under its control. In September 2015, Al-Shabaab retakes the city from Somalia Armed Forces.

On 4th June 2023, the Buq Aqable area was elevated to district level by the Hirshabelle cabinet.
