= Wabxo =

Wabxo El Ue-ba
- Village
- Interactive map of Wabxo
- Coordinates: 4.12°N 45.20°E
- Country: Somalia
- Federal member state: Hirshabelle State
- Region: Hiiraan
- District: Buq Aqable District

Wabxo is a village in Hiiraan, Somalia. It is recorded in geographic databases under the alternate name El Ue-ba or El Ue-bà. The settlement is situated in the interior of Hiiraan, approximately 9 kilometres northwest of Buq Aqable. The settlement is also shown among the localities of the area on regional mapping produced by the Food Security Analysis Unit (FSAU) and the Somalia Water and Land Information Management Project (SWALIM).
