= Biyo Kulul =

Biyo Kulul Biyo Kululo
- Village
- Interactive map of Biyo Kulul
- Coordinates: 3.314458°N 45.483306°E
- Country: Somalia
- Federal member state: Hirshabelle State
- Region: Hiiraan
- District: Jalalaqsi District
- Time zone: UTC+3 (East Africa Time)

Biyo Kulul (also recorded as Biyo Kululo) is a village in Jalalaqsi District, Hiiraan, Somalia. The settlement is documented in humanitarian and geographic sources, including the 2007 Hiran Pastoral and Agro-Pastoral Nutrition Assessment, which lists Biyo Kulul among the agropastoral settlements of Jalalaqsi District. A subsequent 2008 Hiran Nutrition Assessment likewise recorded Biyo Kulul as an agropastoral village. Geographic records also document the name Biyo Kululo in Hiiraan, while regional water-resource mapping identifies the locality in the Jalalaqsi area.

== See also ==
- Jalalaqsi District
- Hiiraan
- Jalalaqsi
- Somalia Water and Land Information Management Project
