= Mahas District =

District in the Hiran region of Somalia

Mahas
- District
- Location in Somalia.
- Coordinates: 4°23′27″N 46°5′18″E
- Country: Somalia (De jure) (Al-Shabaab (militant group)) Islamic Wilayaat of Somalia (De facto)
- State: Hirshabelle
- Region: Hiiraan
- Capital: Mahas

Government
  - Control: al-Shabaab

Area
  - Total: 4 km^{2} (1.5 sq mi)

Population (2005)
  - Total: 2,000
- Time zone: UTC+3 (EAT)

Mahas District (Somali: Degsiimada Maxaas) is a district in the central Hiran region of Somalia. It is in the eastern part of the Hiran region. It is bordered by El Buur District, Adan Yabal District, Mataban District, Guriel District, and Beledweyne District. This district is inhibabited by the Hawadle clan.

== See also ==
- Mahas, Somalia- capital of the district

== Notes ==
- Xawaadle, cali madaxweyne Maxaas, Hiiraan, Somalia
