= Shaw, Hiran =

Coordinates: 3°25′07″N 45°24′22″E

Shaw (also recorded as Sciao,Sciào and Shawo) is a settlement in Hiran, Somalia, in Jalalaqsi District. It is identified as a settlement on humanitarian maps of Jalalaqsi District and is also recorded in humanitarian assessments and contemporary Somali reporting. The locality is associated with a freshwater source documented by FAO SWALIM.Geographic databases also record a feature named Shaw in the same general area as a well. That feature has been assigned the alternative names Sciao, Sciào, and Shawo. Because the geographic feature is classified as a well, its recorded coordinates should not be assumed to represent the coordinates of the settlement itself.
