= Jimbiley =

Town in Hiran Region

Jimbiley Jimbileey (Somali) جنبلي (Arabic) Gumareey
- Town
- Location in Somalia
- Coordinates: 3°24′36″N 45°30′50″E
- Country: Somalia
- Region: Hiran

Government
  - Mayor: Maareey
- Elevation: 127 m (417 ft)

Population
  - Total: 8,000
- Time zone: UTC+3 (EAT)
- Area code: +252

Jimbiley is a town located in the Hiran region of Somalia, situated 9km west of Jalalaqsi district.

The district has a total population of 29,811 with 79%/21% rural/urban divide, and it is inhabited by the Sub clas haji salah Abtisame Gaalje'el clans.
