= War Gubey =

Village in Hiran Region, Hirshabelle, Somalia

War Gubey War Gubey (Somali)
- Village
- Location in Somalia
- Coordinates: 3.432500°N 45.077496°E
- Country: Somalia
- State: Hirshabelle
- Region: Hiran
- District: Jalalaqsi District
- Elevation: 189 m (620 ft)
- Time zone: UTC+3 (EAT)
- Settlement code: X25-002.21

War Gubey is a village located in Hiiraan, Somalia. It is located at approximately 3.432500°N 45.077496°E and lies at an elevation of about 189 metres above sea level. War Gubey is identified as a settlement in the United Nations Office for the Coordination of Humanitarian Affairs (OCHA) Somalia administrative mapping system, where it is assigned the settlement code X25-002.

== Geography ==
War Gubey is located in the Hiiraan region of central Somalia. The village is situated at approximately 3.43329°N 45.07576°E.

The village of Magaaoole lies approximately 2.2 kilometres west of War Gubey, based on the coordinates recorded for the two settlements in geographic-name records.

The spring of Mesaaroole, also recorded as Missarole, lies approximately 2 kilometres west of War Gubey and about 0.2 kilometres east of Magaaoole. It is recorded as a spring in geographic-name records at approximately 3.42881°N 45.05860°E.

== Historical mapping ==
War Gubey is shown on the Ceel Dheem topographic map, sheet NA–38–19, at a scale of 1:100,000. The map is part of Series Y630 and is held in the Perry-Castañeda Library Map Collection at the University of Texas Libraries.

The nearby wells of Missarole (pozzi di Missarole) were recorded during the 1924 expedition of Giuseppe Stefanini and Nello Puccioni. Specimens collected at the wells were later deposited in the zoological collections of Florence.

Missarole also appears in the 1936 Enciclopedia Italiana in its geographical and geological description of Somalia, where it is placed downstream from Bulo Burti.
