= Abdullahi Afrah =

Somali militant and leader of the Islamic Courts Union

- Born: Abdullahi Ali Afrah [aasparo] March 9, 1953; Ceelgaras, Galguduud, Trust Territory of Somaliland (present-day Somalia)
- Died: July 1, 2008 (aged 55); Matabaan, Hiiraan, Somalia
- Cause of death: Killed in action
- Other name: Aasparo

Abdullahi Ali Afrah (March 9, 1953 – July 1, 2008) was Somali militant and leader of the Islamic Courts Union (ICU) during the Somali Civil War. He was killed on 1 July 2008 in a battle with Ethiopian troops in Mataban, in central Somalia.

== Life ==
Afrah was born in Ceelgaras, Somalia. He left there with his parents to Mogadishu when he was five years old.

After he got his master's degree, Asparo moved to Toronto, Ontario, Canada, where he stayed for ten more years.

=== Education ===
Afrah got his bachelor's degree in Agricultural from Lafoole University in 1983, and his master's degree in Crop science from Texas Tech University in 1986. He also got a bachelor's degree in the Islamic studies from the University of Science and Technology, Sana'a in 2005. He joined a variety of other universities but did not complete.

=== Canada ===
Afrah moved to Toronto following the outbreak of the Somali Civil War in 1991, became a Canadian citizen and worked as a security guard with the Toronto Catholic District School Board, before operating a Somali wire transfer service, and eventually co-owning a grocery store on Dundas Street West.

=== Return to Somalia and Islamic Courts Union ===
In 1996, Asparo moved back to Somalia with his family. "I have been there, just like everybody else, working and trying to make a good life. I tried my best and when I finished my intention to stay there I just moved back to Somalia", Afrah said, during a telephone interview with National Post.

He took his wife and children back to Mogadishu in 1997, where he held a senior position in the consultative council of the Islamic Courts Union. Afrah's support of the ICU led William Kaplan to brand him a "Taliban wannabe" in December 2006.

After the ICU were defeated in the end of 2006, following an Ethiopian invasion of Somalia that same year, Afrah stayed behind in Mogadishu. In a telephone interview with Canadian journalist Michelle Shephard, Afrah said that "the only solution is that Ethiopia should get out of Somalia peacefully, or with force," and he vowed that "they will be out, either willingly or unwillingly."

== Death ==
On 1 July 2008, on his way back from his birthplace (Ceelgaras), Asparo was killed by the Ethiopian troops during a violent fighting in central Somalia, in a place called Matabaan, in Hiiraan province.
