= Ceel Warre =

Village in Hiiraan Somalia

- Location within Somalia
- Coordinates: 03°41′25″N 45°19′51″E
- Country: Somalia
- State: Hirshabelle State
- Region: Hiiraan
- District: Buloburde District
- Elevation: 203 m (666 ft)
- Time zone: UTC+03:00

Ceel Warre (also spelled Ceel-Ware and Ceel Ware; also recorded as El Ware) is a village in Buloburde District, in Hiran, Somalia. The locality identified in Somali government records as Tuulada Ceel Ware also in United Nations humanitarian mapping as Ceel-Ware (H08-001).

== See also ==
Dabbad
