= Buloburde and Jalalaqsi bombings =

2023 bombings in Hirshabelle State, Somalia

- Part of Somali Civil War
- Location: Buloburde and Jalalaqsi, Somalia
- Date: January 14, 2023
- Attack type: Car bomb
- Deaths: 35 killed: 12+ killed in Jalalaqsi; 18+ killed in Buloburde
- Injuries: Dozens: 11+ injured in Jalalaqsi; 24+ injured in Buloburde
- Perpetrator: al-Shabaab

On January 14, 2023, al-Shabaab attacked two African Union bases in the cities of Buloburde and Jalalaqsi, both in Hirshabelle State, Somalia. Thirty-five people were killed, and dozens more were injured.

== Background ==
The Somali government, in late 2022, launched a campaign against al-Shabaab in Hirshabelle State, capturing several towns and swaths of land from the group. Buloburde and Jalalaqsi, both major government-controlled cities in the region, have been hit in the past with attacks by al-Shabaab in retaliation to the offensive. On the day of the attack, a remote-controlled bomb injured six people in Mogadishu.

== Attacks ==
=== Jalalaqsi ===
The target of the attack in Jalalaqsi was Nor Dheere, the Somali district commander for Hirshabelle region. Two cars filled with explosives were used by al-Shabaab during the attack, with one parked near a cafe Dheere was eating at and one on the road. When the first car near the cafe exploded, five people were initially killed in the attack, and four others were injured. The toll later rose to eight killed. The second car was stopped at a Somali military checkpoint, who shot at the vehicle as it tried to drive away. When the soldiers shot the driver, the second car exploded immediately, close to an African Union base. The second bombing initially killed one person, and six others were injured.

=== Buloberde ===
The attack in Buloburde targeted a local mosque and an administrative area, and began when an al-Shabab suicide bomber drove an SUV filled with explosives towards the area. The car was intercepted, and exploded near an African Union base in the town and the local police headquarters. Several civilians were killed inside the mosque as well. Eighteen people, including fourteen civilians, were killed in the attack. At least fifty others were injured in the attack.

== Aftermath ==
Al-Shabaab claimed responsibility for all three bombings by January 15. They also claimed responsibility for a second attack in the city of Halgan in Buloberde District on January 16, which killed the police chief and several others.

By January 17, thirty-five people were killed in the attacks. At least twelve people had been killed in the Jalalaqsi attacks, with eleven others injured, and at least eighteen killed in Buloburde, with twenty-four injured.
