= Caag Xoog =

Village in Hiiraan Somalia

Coordinates: 4°17′23″N 44°57′25″E

Caag Xoog is a village in Hiiraan Somalia, located in the Beledweyne District approximately 11 kilometres north of Ceel Cali. The locality is associated with a well bearing the same name. A 2007 humanitarian assessment classified Caag Xoog as an agropastoral settlement. A 2012 OCHA district map also identified Caag Xoog as a settlement.
