= Kurdaaley =

Kurdaaley is a village in Jalalaqsi District, Hiiraan, Somalia. The settlement is documented in regional geographic and humanitarian mapping, including the OCHA reference map for Jalalaqsi District, which identifies Kurdaaley as a settlement with the locality code S10-001. Kurdaaley had already been identified on the OCHA Hiraan regional reference map published in 2011, where it is listed as Kurdaaley (S10-001) within Jalalaqsi District. The locality is also shown on subsequent SWALIM mapping of the Shabelle River, including maps published in 2024 and 2025. Geographic locality data place Kurdaaley in Jalalaqsi District at approximately 3.33°N 45.45°E, and record an elevation of approximately 125 metres above sea level.
