= El Biya Nef =

Village in Hiiraan Region

Ceel Biya Neef (Somali) El Biya Nef (English)
- Village
- Location in Somalia
- Coordinates: 3°40′22″N 45°29′58″E
- Country: Somalia
- Region: Hiiraan
- Elevation: 142 m (466 ft)
- Time zone: UTC+3 (EAT)
- Area code: +252

Ceel Biyo Neef (also known as El Bio Nef) is a town in the Hiiraan region of central Somalia.

The town is centered around a deep water well that serves local residents and surrounding pastoralist communities. It functions as a settlement within a semi-arid environment, where access to groundwater is essential for both human use and livestock.

The town is located at approximately 3°40′22″N 45°29′58″E and has an elevation of about 142 meters.

The area lies within a hot semi-arid climate zone (Köppen BSh), characterized by low and irregular rainfall and dependence on groundwater resources.
