= Bar Medeghe =

- Populated place
- Location in Somalia.
- Coordinates: 4°36′8″N 45°4′29″E
- Country: Somalia
- Region: Hiran
- District: Beledweyne
- Elevation: 196 m (643 ft)
- Time zone: UTC+3 (EAT)

Bar Medeghe (also: Bar Madeghe) is a populated place in the central Hiran province of Somalia. It is situated in the Beledweyne District. The settlement lies 21 km southwest of Beledweyne, the provincial capital.
