= Luuq Jeelow =

Village in Beledweyne District, Hiiraan, Somalia

Coordinates: 4°33′15″N 45°14′59″E

Luuq Jeelow (also spelled Luuq Jelow) is a village in Beledweyne District, Hiiraan, Somalia. The locality is recorded in the Somalia settlement data associated with the UNDP and Food Security Analysis Unit (FSAU) under settlement code NB-3815-L06-007. It is situated in the area west of Beledweyne, the capital of Hiiraan.

Luuq Jeelow is identified on mapping of the Beletweyne area produced by the Food and Agriculture Organization of the United Nations Somalia Water and Land Information Management Project (SWALIM). The locality is also documented in research on settlement patterns in Belet Weyne District and in humanitarian and geographic sources covering the area west of Beledweyne.
