= Halgan District =

Halgan a village
- District
- Nickname: Quaranta une
- Country: Somalia
- Region: Hiran

Area
  - Total: 20 km^{2} (7.7 sq mi)

Population
  - Total: 160,000
- Time zone: UTC+3 (EAT)

Halgan District is a district in the central Hiran region of Somalia. It is mostly inhabited by the Yabar Madaxweyne sub clan of Xawaadle.

In August 2017, the Hirshabelle State, inaugurated the previous year, declared that the Hiran region, which previously had five districts, would have three new districts, Halgan, El Ali, and Far- Libaax, bringing the total number of its districts to eight.
