= Mesaaroole =

Mesaaroole (also known historically Missarole or Misarole) is a spring in the Hiiraan region of Somalia. Located at approximately 3.42881°N 45.0586°E at an elevation of about 151 metres above sea level. During the Italian colonial period, it was recorded as Missarole and was associated with wells known as the pozzi di Missarole.

== See also ==
- Hiiraan
- Buloburde
- Shabelle River
- Italian Somaliland
