= Dheen =

Coordinates: 3°29′35″N 45°29′01″E

Dheen (Somali: Ceel Dheem),(Italian: El Dem) is a rural locality in the Jalalaqsi District, Hiiraan region of Somalia, The locality is recorded in a Somali government presidential-election document from 1986, which lists Dheen among the polling localities in the district.
