= Bilaal =

Village in Hiran Region

Bilaal Bilaal (Somali) بِلَال (Arabic) Ceel Lafoole
- Town
- Location in Somalia Bilaal (Africa)
- Coordinates: 3°22′37″N 45°29′11″E
- Country: Somalia
- Region: Hiran
- Elevation: 127 m (417 ft)

Population
  - Total: 8,000
- Time zone: UTC+3 (EAT)
- Area code: +252

Bilaal or El Bilal, is a village in the Hiran region of Somalia, located 10 km (6.4 mi) west of Jalalaqsi and 145 km (90 mi) northwest of the Somalian capital Mogadishu.

== Location ==
Bilaal is located 10 km (6.4 mi) west of Jalalaqsi and 145 km (90 mi) northwest of the Somalian capital Mogadishu.

Although it is now a small village, Bilal is one of the oldest settlements in Hiran region, during the colonial period it was a very developed area, was built at the first school in Hiran region (Bilal Primary and Secondary School).
