= Hilloawmahad =

- Town
- Location in Somalia.
- Coordinates: 3°17′N 45°34′E
- Country: Somalia
- Region: Hiran
- Time zone: UTC+3 (EAT)

Hilloawmahad is a town in the central Hiran region of Somalia.
