= Ceelbaar =

Ceelbaar (also recorded as Ceel-Baar and Ceel Baar) is a village in Beletweyne District, Hiiraan, Somalia. The settlement is documented in Somali government electoral records from the 1980s, including records for the 1986 presidential election and regulations concerning polling places issued in 1988. Geographic settlement records also list Ceelbaar as a village in the Belet Weyne area, at approximately 4.60°N 45.07°E.
