= Kulankaxajicabdi =

- Town
- Location in Somalia.
- Coordinates: 3°41′N 45°36′E
- Country: Somalia
- Region: Hiran
- Time zone: UTC+3 (EAT)

Kulankaxajicabdi is a town in the central Hiran region of Somalia.
