= Mahas, Somalia =

Town in Hiran, Somalia

Mahas Town
- Location in Somalia.
- Coordinates: 4°23′27″N 46°5′18″E
- Country: Somalia (De jure) (Al-Shabaab (militant group)) Islamic Emirate of Somalia (De facto)
- State: Hirshabelle
- Region: Hiiraan

Government
  - Control: al-Shabaab
- Time zone: UTC+3 (EAT)

Mahas (Somali: Maxaas) is a town in the central Somalia of Hiiraan region and the capital of its eastern Mahas District.

== History ==
On 4 January 2023, an al-Shabaab double car bombing killed 35 people.

On 3 September 2023, the town was visited by President Hassan Sheikh Mohamud to remobilize the local troops after recent defeats at the hands of Al-Shabaab.

On 7 August 2024, the African Union Transition Mission in Somalia (ATMIS) has handed over the Maxaas Forward Operating Base (FOB) to the Somali National Armed Forces (SNAF) as part of the ongoing Phase Three drawdown.

On 27 July 2025, al-Shabaab took control of the town. According to witnesses, the government troops withdrew unexpectedly overnight and residents said that the local Ma'awisley militias expected an attack from the north but al-Shabaab instead approached from the south, taking the town by surprise.
