= Buloburde District =

Buloburde District Degmada Buulo Burde Buulaay
- District
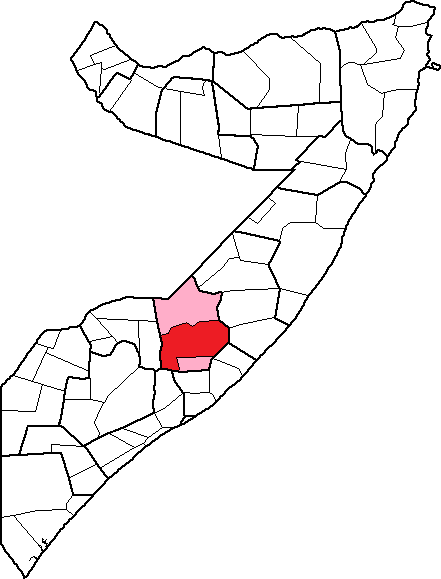
- Country: Somalia
- Region: Hiran
- Capital: Buloburde
- Time zone: UTC+3 (EAT)

Buloburde District (Somali: Degmada Buulo-Burte) is a district in the central Hiran region of Somalia. Its capital lies at Buloburde.

- neighborhoods Buloburte
1. Octobar
2. Hanti-wadaag
3. Indhaceel
4. Bag abeeso
5. Madiino
6. Wadajir
7. Xaaji buube

== Settlements ==
- War Gubey
- Mukayle
- Ceel Warre
- Ceel Dhanyaweyne
- Ceel Biyo Neef / Biyoneef
- Buur Weyn
- Tardo
- Ceel Qoobaxas
- Gimbilei
- Dhejis
- Dabayoodle
- Yasooman
- Aborey
- Qorof
- Fodil,Hiran

== See also ==
- Abdi Mohamed Sheikh Hassan
- Abdikafi Salah Ibrahim
