= Lindy Elkins-Tanton =

American planetary scientist

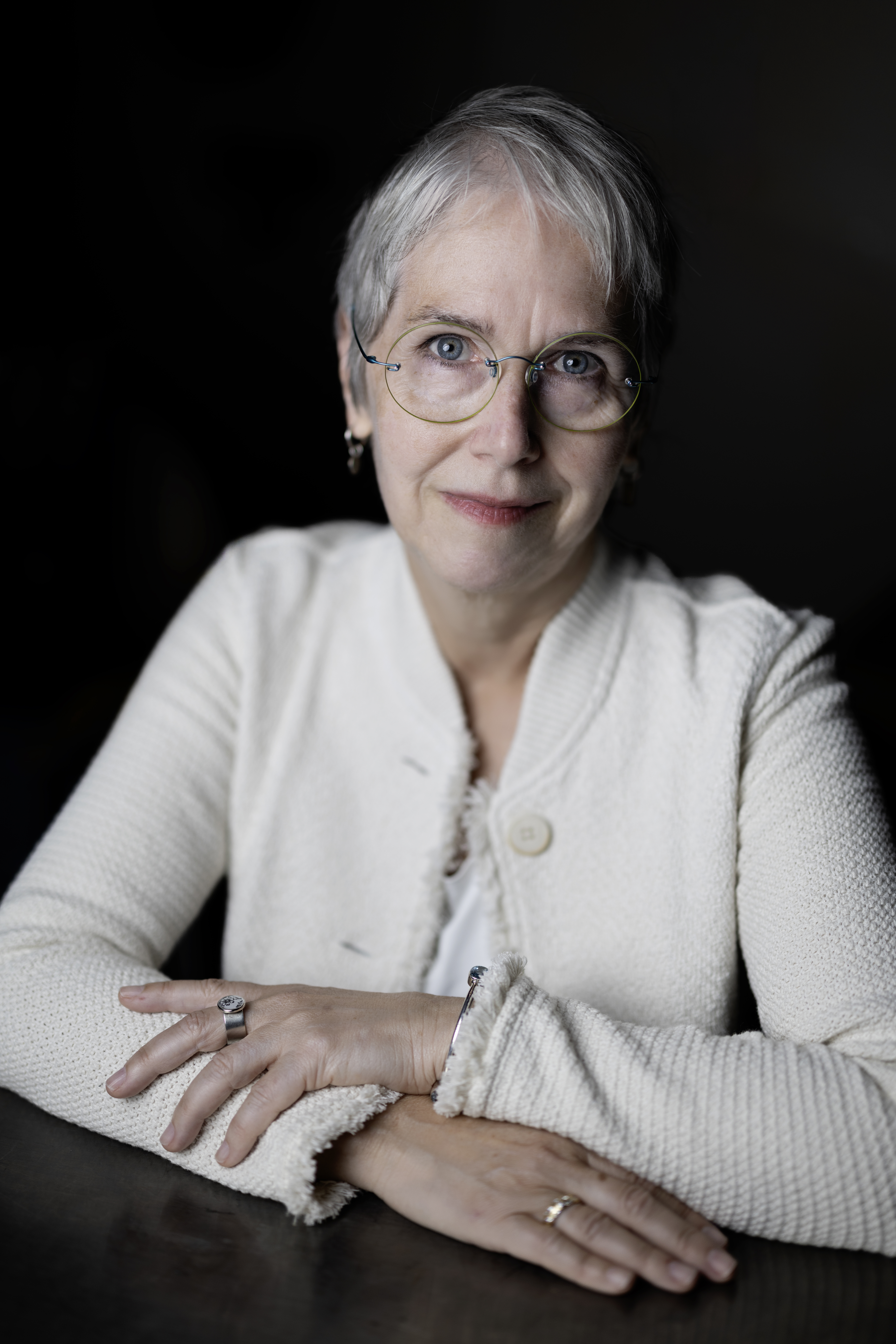
- Elkins-Tanton in 2026
- Education: Massachusetts Institute of Technology
- Known for: Psyche
- Spouse: James Tanton
- Scientific career
- Fields: Planetary Science
- Workplaces: School of Earth and Space Exploration, Arizona State University; Carnegie Institution for Science; Brown University; St. Mary's College of Maryland
- Doctoral advisors: Timothy L. Grove, Bradford H. Hager

Linda Tarbox Elkins-Tanton is an American planetary scientist and professor whose research concerns terrestrial planetary evolution. She is the Principal Investigator of NASA's Psyche mission to explore the metallic asteroid 16 Psyche, Director of the UC Berkeley Space Sciences Laboratory, and co-founder of Beagle Learning, a tech company training and measuring collaborative problem-solving and critical thinking. Much of her current work concerns supporting teams to excel both for their products and projects and for the individual team members; these ideas are laid out in her book on teams, Mission Ready: How to Build Teams that Perform under Pressure (Basic Venture, an imprint of Hachette, 2026).

== Career ==
Elkins-Tanton earned her B.S. in geology, M.S. in geochemistry, and Ph.D. in geology, all from the Massachusetts Institute of Technology (MIT) in Cambridge, Massachusetts. She was a professor at MIT, a research scientist at Brown University, and a lecturer at St. Mary's College of Maryland, and worked in the industry for a number of years. Within 10 years of completing her Ph.D. and serving as an associate professor in geology at MIT, she was recruited to the directorship position at the Carnegie Institution for Science's Department of Terrestrial Magnetism. She became the director of Arizona State University's School of Earth and Space Science on July 1, 2014 and went on to be Vice President for ASU's Interplanetary Initiative before departing for UC Berkeley in 2025. At UC Berkeley she serves as Director of the Space Sciences Laboratory, which was founded in 1959 and has led or participated in over 100 space missions to learn about our solar system, galaxy, and universe.

Elkins-Tanton leads NASA's Psyche mission to explore the metallic asteroid 16 Psyche. The mission launched successfully on October 13, 2023, and is operating as expected on its cruise to the asteroid. Elkins-Tanton is the second woman to win a competed NASA mission to a major Solar System body.

Elkins-Tanton is also a co-founder of and the Higher Education Lead for Beagle Learning, which provides software tools and coaching that make passion projects, project teams, and exploration-based learning techniques accessible.

Elkins-Tanton has led four field expeditions in Siberia for a broad study that demonstrated the chronology of extinction and eruption, quantified additions of sulphur and naturally-occurring halocarbons to the atmosphere, and provided the first ever direct evidence that extensive coal burning in Siberia is a cause of the Permo-Triassic Extinction. She is co-chair of the landmark NAS report A Science Strategy for the Human Exploration of Mars (2025), and has served on the Planetary Decadal Survey Mars panel, the Mars 2020 Rover Science Definition Team, and the Europa Clipper Standing Review Board.

== Awards and honors ==
Elkins-Tanton was twice named a National Academy of Sciences Kavli Frontiers of Science Fellow. She was awarded a five-year National Science Foundation CAREER award in 2008 and was named Outstanding MIT Faculty Undergraduate Research Mentor in 2009. In 2010, she was awarded the Explorers Club Lowell Thomas prize for Exploring Extinction. In 2013, she was named an Astor Fellow at the University of Oxford hosted by Tamsin Mather. In 2016 she was named a fellow of the American Geophysical Union. In 2020 she was awarded the Arthur L. Day Prize and Lectureship. Asteroid 8252 Elkins-Tanton is named after her. She is a member of the National Academy of Sciences and of the American Academy of Arts & Sciences, and in 2022 William Morrow published her memoir, A Portrait of the Scientist as a Young Woman. In 2025 she was awarded the NASA Outstanding Public Leadership Medal.

In 2022, a newly discovered mineral, elkinstantonite, found in the El Ali meteorite, was named after Elkins-Tanton by Drs. Chris Herd and Andrew Locock of the University of Alberta.

== Selected publications ==
- Elkins-Tanton, Lindy (2026) Mission Ready: How to Build Teams that Perform under Pressure, Basic Venture, an imprint of Hachette Publishing. p.296. ISBN 978-1-5417-0603-3
- Polanskey, C.A., L.T. Elkins-Tanton…et al. (2025) Psyche mission description and design rationale, Space Science Reviews, 221(95), p. 94.
- Elkins-Tanton, Linda (2022). A Portrait of the Scientist as a Young Woman: A Memoir. HarperCollins. p. 272. ISBN 978-0063086906.
- Elkins-Tanton, L.T., S.E. Grasby, B.A. Black, R.V. Veselovskiy, O.H. Ardakani, F. Goodarzi (2020) Field evidence for coal combustion links the 252 My-old Siberian Traps with global carbon disruption, Geology v48(1), v 48(10), 986–991.
- L.T. Elkins-Tanton and B. Weiss, editors. (2017) Planetesimals: Early Differentiation and Consequences for Planets, Cambridge University Press. ISBN 978-1-107-11848-5
- Elkins-Tanton, Linda; Schmidt, Anja; Fristad, Kirsten (2015). Volcanism and Global Environmental Change. Cambridge University Press. p. 310. ISBN 978-1107058378.
- Schmidt, Anja; Fristad, Kirsten; Elkins-Tanton, Linda; editors (2015). Volcanism and Global Environmental Change. Cambridge University Press. p. 310. ISBN 978-1-107-05837-8
- Elkins-Tanton, L.T., (2012) Magma oceans in the inner solar system, Annual Review of Earth and Planetary Sciences, 40, 113-139.
- Elkins-Tanton, L.T., B.P. Weiss, M.T. Zuber (2011) Chondrites as samples of differentiated planetesimals, Earth and Planetary Science Letters 305, 1-10, DOI: 10.1016/j.epsl.2011.03.010.
- Elkins-Tanton, Linda (2010). The Solar System Six-Volume Set. Facts on File. ISBN 978-0-8160-8347-3.
- Elkins-Tanton L.T. (2008) Linked magma ocean solidification and atmospheric growth for Earth and Mars, Earth and Planetary Science Letters 271, 181-191.

== See also ==
- List of women in leadership positions on astronomical instrumentation projects
