= Baar-Qulay =

Baar-Qulay is a locality in Hiiraan, Somalia. It is situated in the Beledweyne District, approximately 16 km southwest of Beledweyne, the regional capital. The locality is recorded in humanitarian geographic datasets under the settlement code J02-001.

Baar-Qulay is identified on humanitarian mapping of the Belet Weyne District and is shown on maps produced by the Food and Agriculture Organization's Somalia Water and Land Information Management project (FAO-SWALIM). Geographic datasets place the locality at approximately 4.62534°N, 45.08975°E, at an elevation of about 197 m above sea level.
