= Haraale =

Village in Somalia

Haraale is a village in Buloburde District, Hiiraan, Somalia. It is located at approximately 4.260225°N 45.271640°E. The settlement is documented in humanitarian and geographic sources, including the United Nations Office for the Coordination of Humanitarian Affairs (OCHA) Bulo Burto District reference map, published in 2012, which identifies Haraale with the settlement code T06-001. The map states that its settlement data were sourced from UNDP Somalia (1998), indicating that Haraale was included in the mapped settlement network by that period. Haraale was also listed in the 2007 Hiran Pastoral and Agro-Pastoral Nutrition Assessment, which classified it as a pastoral settlement and gave a maximum population estimate of 2,100 in the assessment's sampling frame.
