= Ceel Lafoole =

Village in Hiiraan, Somalia

- Village
- Location in Somalia
- Coordinates: 3°23′0″N 45°30′0″E
- Country: Somalia
- State: Hirshabelle
- Region: Hiiraan
- Time zone: UTC+3 (EAT)

Ceel Lafoole is a village in Jalalaqsi District Hiiraan, Somalia. It is located in the Jalalaqsi District area. The settlement is recorded in geographical-name data supplied by the National Geospatial-Intelligence Agency as a populated place at 3°23′00″N 45°30′00″E. Ceel Lafoole is also identified on the Somalia administrative atlas in the Jalalaqsi area.
