= Jalalaqsi District =

Jalalaqsi
- District
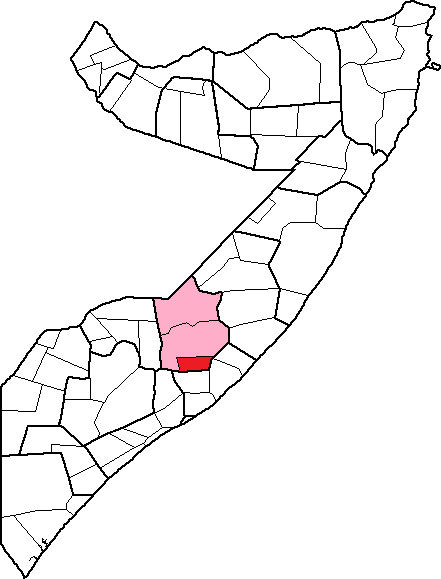
- Country: Somalia
- Region: Hiran
- Capital: Jalalaqsi
- Time zone: UTC+3 (EAT)

Jalalaqsi District (Somali: Degmada Jalalaqsi) is an administrative district in the central Hiran region of Somalia. It has its capital at Jalalaqsi.

== Settlements ==
- Bilaal
- Biyo Kulul
- Jalalaqsi
- Kurdaaley
- Ceel Lafoole
- Dheen
- War Gubey
- Gawey
- Damal,Somalia
