= Elaliite =

Mineral

General
- Category: Minerals
- Formula: Fe_{9}PO_{12}
- Crystal system: Orthorhombic
- Space group: Cmmm (no. 65)

Elaliite is a mineral with formula Fe_{9}PO_{12} (or Fe^{2+}_{8}Fe^{3+}(PO_{4})O_{8}) that was first synthesized in a laboratory in the 1980s and later identified in natural material in 2022 at which time the official mineral designation was given. The mineral is orthorhombic, with space group Cmmm (space group 65).

== History ==
Elaliite was first identified in nature by scientists from the University of Alberta who were given a 70 gram piece of the 15-ton El Ali meteorite that came to the attention of the scientific community in 2020. Elaliite was named after the El Ali district in Somalia where the meteorite was found.

The mineral was identified by Andrew Locock who is employed by the university as the head of its electron microprobe laboratory, and classified by geologist Chris Herd. Locock also identified the first natural specimen of elkinstantonite in the same sample.

Synthetic versions of elaliite were produced in a French laboratory in the 1980s but could not be categorised as a mineral until they were found in nature. The future of the meteorite is uncertain as it has been shipped to China presumably for sale.
