= Elkinstantonite =

Mineral

General
- Category: Minerals
- Formula: Fe_{4}(PO_{4})_{2}O
- Crystal system: Monoclinic
- Space group: P2_{1}/c (no. 14)

Elkinstantonite /ˌɛlkɪnzˈtæntənaɪt/ is a mineral with formula Fe_{4}(PO_{4})_{2}O that was first generated in a laboratory in the 1980s and first identified from natural origins in 2022, when the official mineral designation was also given. It is monoclinic, with space group P2_{1}/c (space group 14).

== History ==
Elkinstantonite was first identified in nature by scientists from the University of Alberta who were given a 70-gram piece of an ancient 15-ton El Ali meteorite that landed in Somalia and was first noticed by the international scientific community in 2020. Elkinstantonite was named after NASA scientist Lindy Elkins-Tanton.

The mineral was identified by Andrew Locock who is employed by the university as the head of its electron microprobe laboratory, and classified by geologist Chris Herd. Locock also identified the first natural specimen of elaliite in the same sample.

Synthetic versions of elkinstantonite were produced in a French laboratory in the 1980s, but could not be categorised as a mineral until they were found in nature.
