= Dirisame =

Somali clan

Dirisame (Italian: Dirisama) is a subdivision of the Gaalje'el (Gaaljecel) clan of Somalia. A 1931 Italian colonial population census recorded Dirisama as a subtribe within the Galgial population of the Upper Uebi Scebeli region. The census associated the Galgial population, including Dirisama, with a number of localities in the Belet Uein area, among them El Ali.
