= Guriel =

Town in Somalia

Guriel Guriceel جرعيل
- City
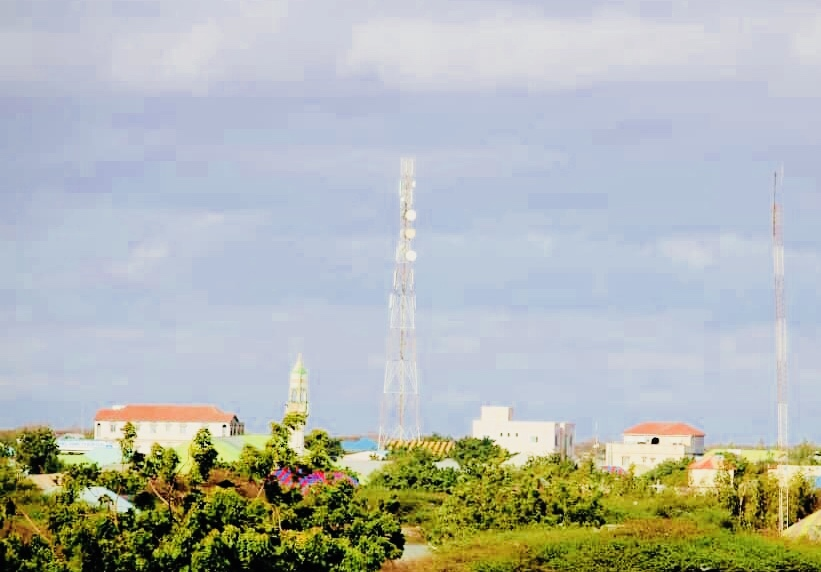

- Location in Somalia
- Coordinates: 5°18′32″N 45°52′55″E
- Country: Somalia
- State: Galmudug
- Region: Galguduud
- District: Guriel

Government
  - Type: Mayor-Council-Commission
- Time zone: UTC+3 (EAT)

Guriel (Somali: Guriceel, Arabic: جرعيل, جوري عيل ) is the second largest city in the central Galguduud region of Somalia located in Galmudug state. The city serves as the capital of the Guriel District.

== Conflict ==
This city has been in conflict since the fall of the former Somali government in 1991. In 2006, the Islamic Courts Union (ICU), a militant Islamic organization, took control of most of central Somalia. Transitional Federal Government of Somalia, supported by Ethiopia, defeated the ICU in late 2006.

In 2007, Al-Shabaab, another Islamic extremist group born in southern Somalia, attacked Guriel, but the local paramilitary group Ahlu Sunna Waljama'a (ASWJ), born in response, took control of Guriel in 2010.

However, the conflict between ASWJ and Al-Shabaab did not stop after that, and the Ethiopian army also intervened in the conflict. In addition to that, Galmudug, a regional government created in central Somalia, joined the conflict in the name of Somali government forces.

In October 2021, another battle broke out between ASWJ and Galmudug, displacing most of the inhabitants of Guriel (5,000 houses, 20,000 people). Both the main hospital and the community hospital were destroyed by fire and shelling.

By the end of the year, an estimated 120 people had died in this recent spate of fighting.
