= Magaaoole =

Magaaoole is a village in the Hiiraan region of Somalia, located at 3°25′41″N 45°03′25″E and approximately 192 metres above sea level. The settlement is recorded as Magaaoole (P02-001) on United Nations Office for the Coordination of Humanitarian Affairs maps of the Hiiraan region published in 2011 and the Bulo Burto district published in 2012.
