= Psyche (spacecraft) =

Reconnaissance NASA mission of the main belt asteroid 16 Psyche

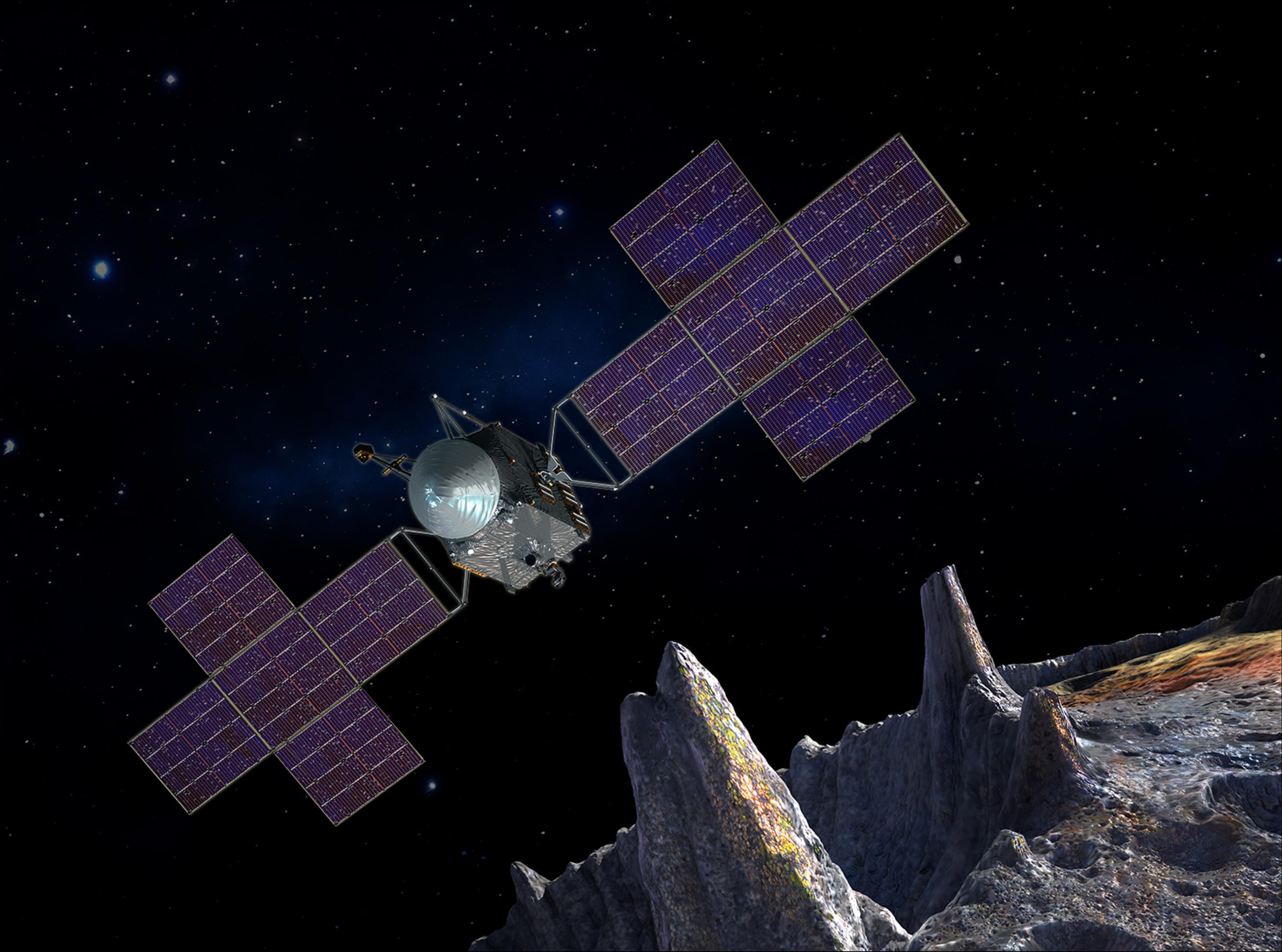
- An artist's concept illustration of the Psyche spacecraft as it orbits 16 Psyche
- Mission type: Asteroid orbiter
- Operator: NASA; ASU
- COSPAR ID: 2023-157A
- SATCAT no.: 58049
- Website: NASA: www.nasa.gov/psyche; ASU: psyche.ssl.berkeley.edu
- Mission duration: Cruise: 3 years, 1 month, 6 days (in progress); Science: 21 months in orbit

Spacecraft properties
- Spacecraft: Psyche
- Manufacturer: Maxar Technologies
- Launch mass: 2,608 kg (5,750 lb)
- Dry mass: 1,648 kg (3,633 lb)
- Payload mass: 30 kg (66 lb)
- Power: 4.5 kW

Start of mission
- Launch date: 13 October 2023, 14:19 UTC
- Rocket: Falcon Heavy
- Launch site: Kennedy Space Center, LC-39A
- Contractor: SpaceX

Flyby of Mars (gravity assist)
- Closest approach: 15 May 2026
- Distance: 4,500 km (2,800 mi)

16 Psyche orbiter
- Orbital insertion: August 2029
Instruments
- Psyche Multispectral Imager: Multispectral Imager
- Gamma Ray and Neutron Spectrometer: Gamma Ray and Neutron Spectrometer
- Magnetometer: Magnetometer
- Gravity Science: X-band Gravity Science Investigation
- Psyche mission patch Discovery Program

Psyche (/ˈsaɪki/ SY-kee) is a NASA Discovery Program space mission launched on October 13, 2023, to explore the origin of planetary cores by orbiting and studying the metallic asteroid 16 Psyche beginning in 2029. NASA's Jet Propulsion Laboratory (JPL) manages the project.

The spacecraft will orbit the asteroid from August 5, 2029, to October 31, 2031, spending 817 days in orbit. Psyche uses solar-powered Hall-effect thrusters for propulsion and orbital maneuvering, the first interplanetary spacecraft to use that technology. It is also the first mission to use laser optical communications beyond the Earth-Moon system.

== History ==
The proposal for the Psyche mission was submitted by Lindy Elkins-Tanton, a principal investigator at Arizona State University, as part of a call for proposals for NASA's Discovery Program missions 13 and 14 that closed in February 2015. It was shortlisted on September 30, 2015, as one of five finalists, and awarded US$3 million for further concept development.

On January 4, 2017, Psyche was selected for the 14th Discovery mission, with launch set for 2023. In May 2017, the launch date was moved up to target a more efficient trajectory, to July 2022 aboard a SpaceX Falcon Heavy launch vehicle with a January 31, 2026 arrival, following a Mars gravity assist on May 23, 2023.

In June 2022 NASA found that the late delivery of the testing equipment and Guidance, Navigation, and Control (GNC) flight software for the Psyche spacecraft did not give them enough time to complete the required testing, and decided to delay the launch, with future windows available in 2023 and 2024 to rendezvous with the asteroid in 2029 and 2030, respectively.

On October 28, 2022, NASA announced that Psyche was targeting a launch period opening on October 10, 2023, which would correspond with an arrival at the asteroid in August 2029.

An independent review of the delays at JPL reported in November 2022 found understaffing, insufficient planning, and communications issues among engineers and with management. The VERITAS Venus mission was delayed to free up staff to focus on Psyche.

On April 18, 2023, JPL's mission page for Psyche was updated to reflect a new launch date of October 5, 2023. On September 28, 2023, the launch was again delayed to no earlier than October 12, 2023, due to an unspecified issue with the spacecraft. After one additional delay due to bad weather, Psyche was launched successfully on October 13, 2023.

An update in May 2024 reported the spacecraft was in good health and on track to complete its mission on the planned timeline along with commencing fire of its xenon thrusters.

In April 2025, Psyche experienced an unexpected drop in the pressure of its xenon propulsion system. The spacecraft paused its thrusting while the problem was under investigation and its system engineers considered resorting to the spacecraft's backup redundancy fuel line in order to continue the probe's thrust operation. Following a switch to the backup fuel line in May, full thruster operation resumed on June 16, 2025.

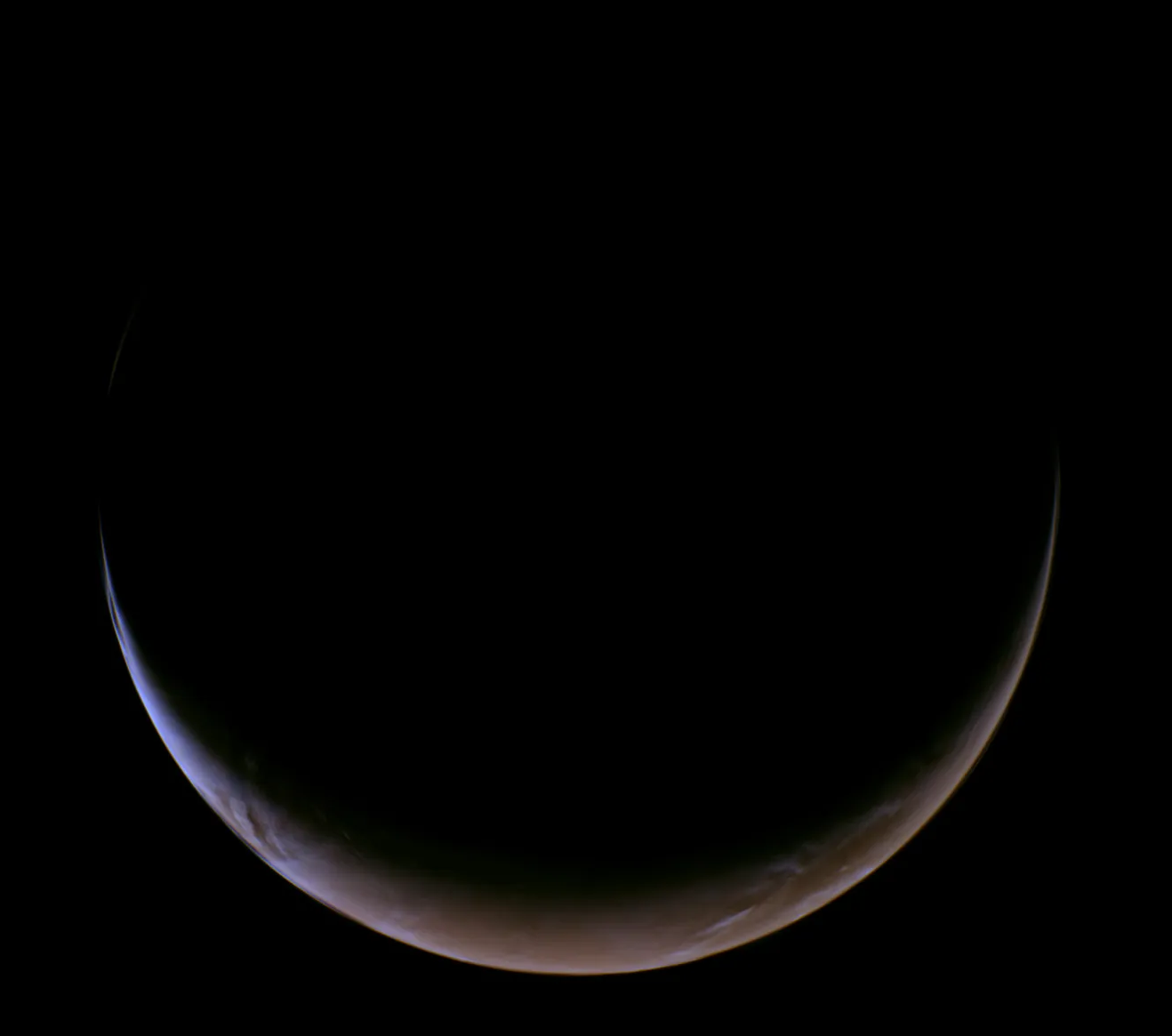
A color image of a crescent-shaped Mars, taken by the Psyche space probe as it approached in May 2026.

On May 15, 2026, Psyche successfully flew by Mars as part of a gravity-assist maneuver that adjusted its orbital tilt around the Sun, allowing the probe and its path to align with the orbital plane of asteroid Psyche. The probe flew as close as 4,500 km (2,800 mi) above the surface of the Red Planet. The probe used its multispectral imager instrument to image the planet. Because Psyche approached Mars at a high phase angle, the planet appeared as a thin crescent before the close flyby, illuminated by sunlight reflected from its surface. Images taken by the spacecraft’s multispectral cameras showed the crescent appearing brighter and stretching farther around Mars than expected because sunlight was strongly scattered by the planet’s dusty atmosphere.

== Target ==
16 Psyche is the heaviest known M-type asteroid with a mean diameter of 220 kilometres (140 mi), and may be an exposed iron core of a protoplanet, the remnant of a violent collision with another object that stripped off its mantle and crust.

Recent studies show that it is "a mixed metal and silicate world". Another study considers it to be either a metal core of a protoplanet or "a differentiated world with a regolith composition ... peppered with localized regions of high metal concentrations". Radar observations of the asteroid from Earth indicate an iron–nickel composition.

The historical asteroid symbol for Psyche, a butterfly's wing topped by a star, may have influenced the mission insignia.

== Mission overview ==
The Psyche spacecraft is designed with solar electric propulsion, and the scientific payload includes a multispectral imager, a magnetometer, and a gamma-ray spectrometer.

The mission is designed to perform 21 months of science. The spacecraft was built by NASA Jet Propulsion Laboratory (JPL) in collaboration with SSL (formerly Space Systems/Loral) and Arizona State University.

It was proposed that the rocket launch might be shared with a separate mission named Athena, that would perform a single flyby of asteroid 2 Pallas, the third-largest asteroid in the Solar System.

In May 2020, it was announced that the Falcon Heavy carrying Psyche would include two smallsat secondary payloads to study the Martian atmosphere and binary asteroids, named EscaPADE (Escape and Plasma Acceleration and Dynamics Explorers) and Janus respectively, but in September 2020, the EscaPADE Mars atmosphere probe was removed from the plan.

Janus was later removed from the Psyche mission as well on November 18, 2022, after an assessment determined that it would not be on the required trajectory to meet its science requirements as a result of Psyche's new launch period.

=== Science goals and objectives ===
Artist's illustration depicting the metal-rich asteroid Psyche.

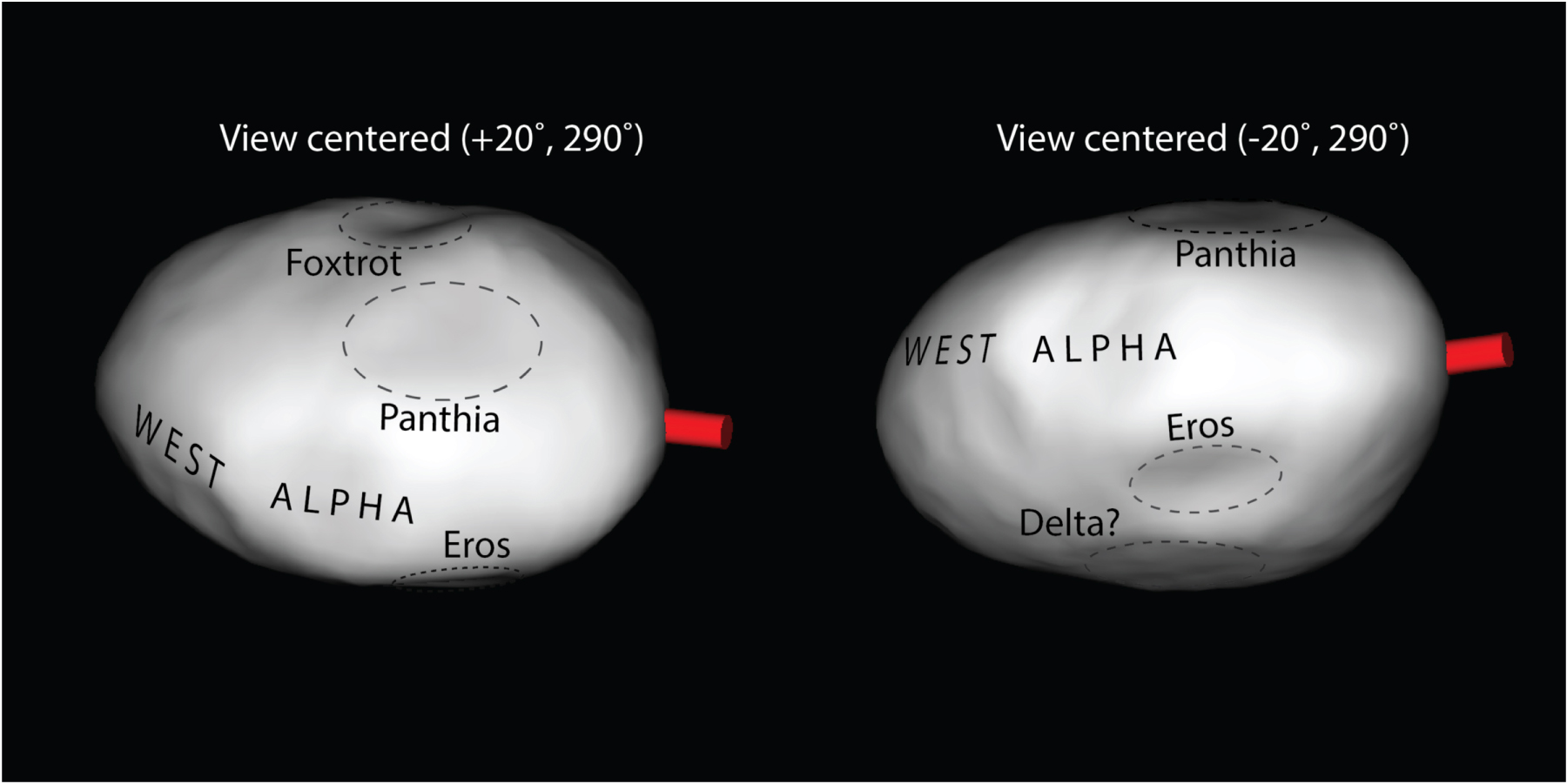
Shape model of asteroid Psyche, with some of the observed surface features indicated.

Differentiation is a fundamental process in shaping many asteroids and all terrestrial planets, and direct exploration of a core could greatly enhance understanding of this process. The Psyche mission aims to characterize 16 Psyche's geology, shape, elemental composition, magnetic field, and mass distribution. It is expected that this mission will increase the understanding of planetary formation and interiors.

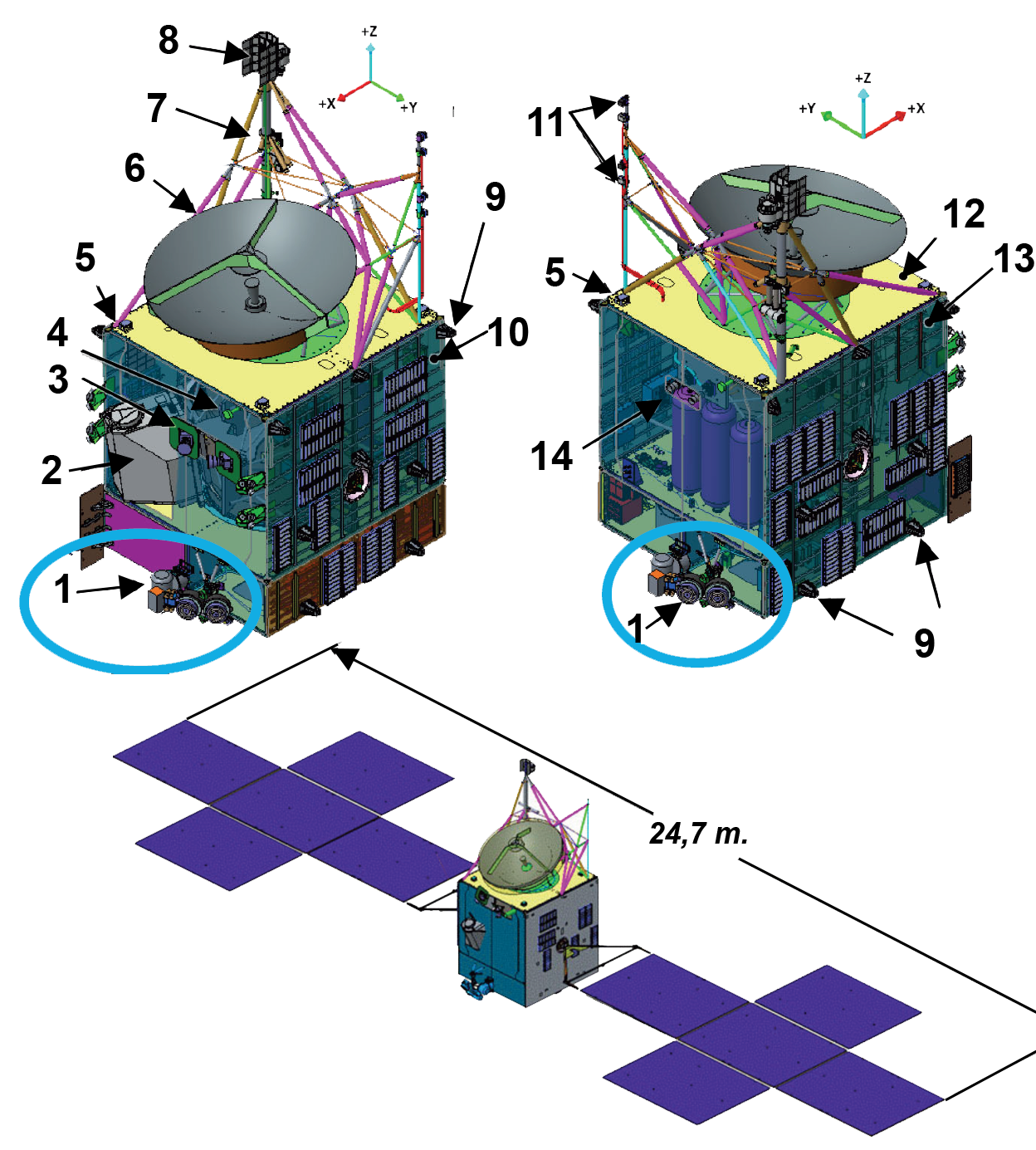
Instruments onboard of the spacecraft: 1. Hall-effect thrusters; 2. Optical telecommunications system; 3. Star trackers; 4. Low-gain antenna; 5. Sun sensor; 6. X-band High-gain antenna; 7. Neutron spectrometer; 8. Gamma-ray spectrometer; 9. Cold gas thrusters; 10. -Y Panel; 11. Magnetometer; 12. Top deck; 13. +Y Panel; 14. Multispectral imagers (x2)

Specifically, the science goals for the mission are:

- Understand a previously unexplored building block of planet formation: iron cores.
- Look inside terrestrial planets, including Earth, by directly examining the interior of a differentiated body, which otherwise could not be seen.
- Explore a new type of world, made of metal.

The science questions this mission aims to address are:

- Is 16 Psyche the stripped core of a differentiated planetesimal, or was it formed as an iron-rich body? What were the building blocks of planets? Did planetesimals that formed close to the Sun have very different bulk compositions?
- If 16 Psyche was stripped of its mantle, when and how did that occur?
- If 16 Psyche was once molten, did it solidify from the inside out, or the outside in?
- Did 16 Psyche produce a magnetic dynamo as it cooled?
- What are the major alloy elements that coexist in the iron metal of the core?
- What are the key characteristics of the geologic surface and global topography? Does 16 Psyche look radically different from known stony and icy bodies?
- How do craters on a metal body differ from those in rock or ice?

== Instruments ==
Payloads installed on Psyche are:

Instrument	Function	Team
The Psyche Multispectral Imager	It will provide high-resolution images using filters to discriminate between 16 Psyche's metallic and silicate constituents. The instrument consists of a pair of identical cameras designed to acquire geologic, compositional, and topographic data. The purpose of the second camera is to provide redundancy for mission-critical optical navigation.	Arizona State University
Psyche Gamma-ray and Neutron Spectrometer	It will detect, measure, and map 16 Psyche's elemental composition. The instrument is mounted on a 6-foot (1.8 m) boom to distance the sensors from background radiation created by energetic particles interacting with the spacecraft and to provide an unobstructed field of view.	Applied Physics Laboratory at Johns Hopkins University.
Psyche Magnetometer	The Psyche Magnetometer is designed to detect and measure the remanent magnetic field of the asteroid. It is composed of two identical high-sensitivity magnetic field sensors located at the middle and outer end of a 6-foot (1.8 m) boom.	Massachusetts Institute of Technology and Technical University of Denmark
Deep Space Optical Communications (DSOC)	The Psyche mission will test a sophisticated new laser communication technology that encodes data in infrared-photons (rather than radio waves) to communicate with a probe in deep space from Earth. Using shorter wavelengths allows the spacecraft to transmit more data in a given amount of time.	Jet Propulsion Laboratory

== Spacecraft ==
The spacecraft uses the Space Systems/Loral (SSL) 1300 bus platform. JPL added the command and data handling and telecom subsystems and all flight software.

=== Propulsion ===
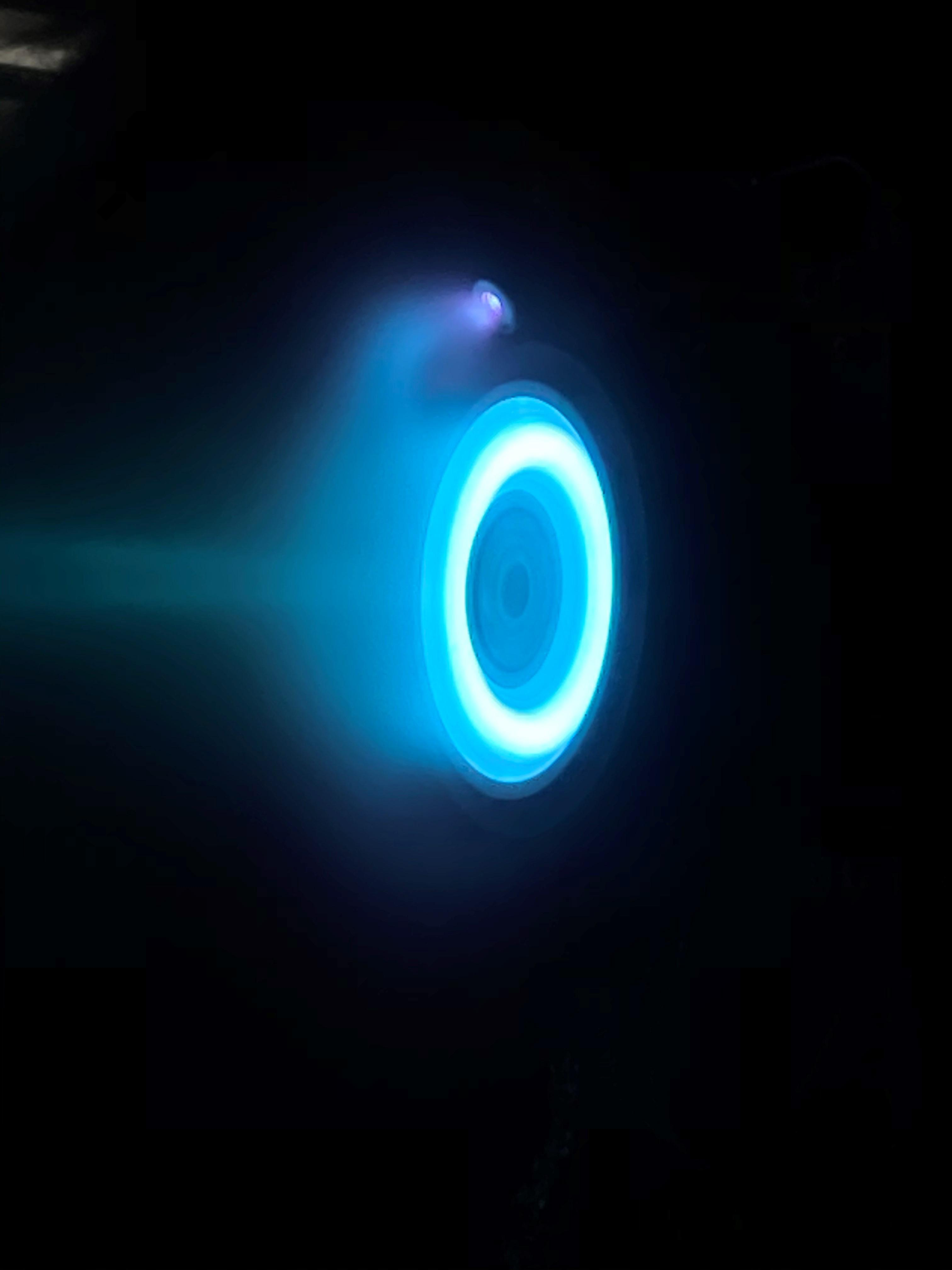
SPT-140 Hall-effect thrusters undergoing testing at NASA's Jet Propulsion Laboratory.

SPT-140	Parameter/units
Type	Hall-effect thruster
Power	Max: 4.5 kW; Min: 900 watts
Specific impulse (I_{sp})	1800 seconds
Thrust	280 mN
Thruster mass	8.5 kg
Propellant mass	922 kg of xenon
Total impulse	8.2 MN·s (for Psyche)

The spacecraft uses ion propulsion. It has four SPT-140 engines, which are Hall-effect thrusters using solar electric propulsion, where electricity generated from solar panels is transmitted to an electric, rather than chemically powered, rocket engine. The thruster is nominally rated at 4.5 kW operating power, but it will also operate for long durations at about 900 watts. Psyche is the first interplanetary mission to use Hall-effect thrusters, although not the first to use electric thrusters in general.

The SPT-140 (SPT stands for Stationary Plasma Thruster) is a production line commercial propulsion system that was invented in the USSR by OKB Fakel and developed by NASA's Glenn Research Center, Space Systems/Loral, and Pratt & Whitney since the late 1980s. The SPT-140 thruster was first tested in the US at the Plasmadynamics and Electric Propulsion Laboratory in 1997, and later as a 3.5 kW unit in 2002 as part of the Air Force Integrated High Payoff Rocket Propulsion Technology program.

Using solar electric thrusters will allow the spacecraft to arrive at 16 Psyche much faster, while consuming less than 10% of the propellant it would need using conventional chemical propulsion.

=== Power ===
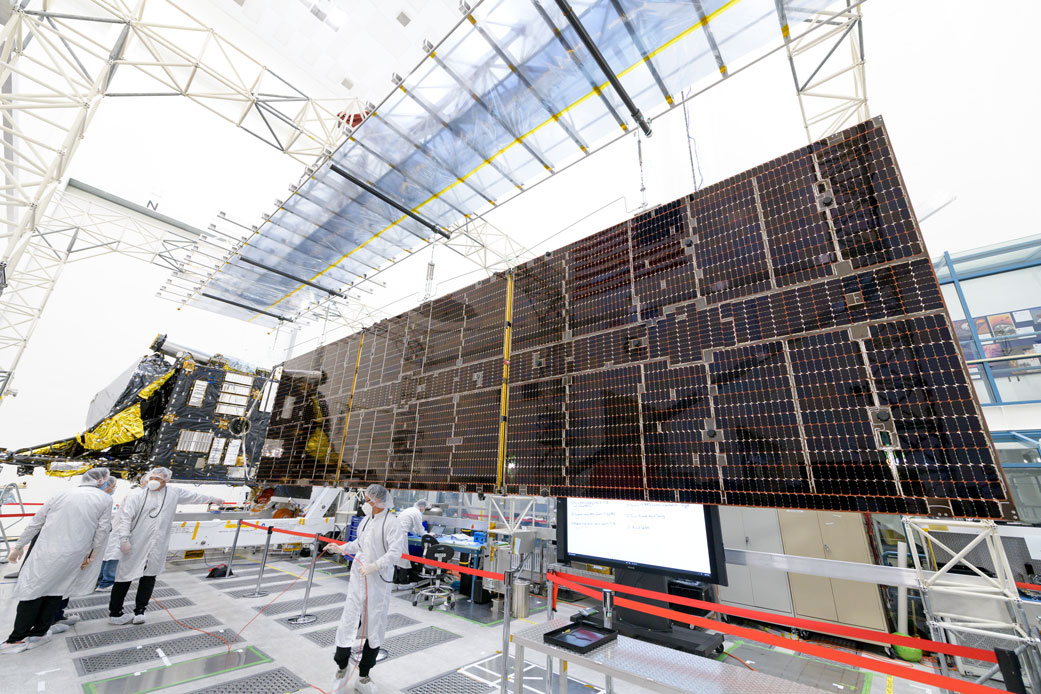
One of two solar arrays on the spacecraft partially deployed (only horizontally) in JPL's clean room.

Solar panels	Parameter/units
Type	Triple-Junction Solar Cells
Power	Solar array performance: At Earth: 20 kW; At 16 Psyche: 2.3 kW

Electricity will be generated by bilateral solar panels in an X-shaped configuration, with five panels on each side. Prior to the mission being moved forward with a new trajectory, the panels were to be arranged in straight lines, with only four panels on each side of the spacecraft.

=== Laser communications experiment ===
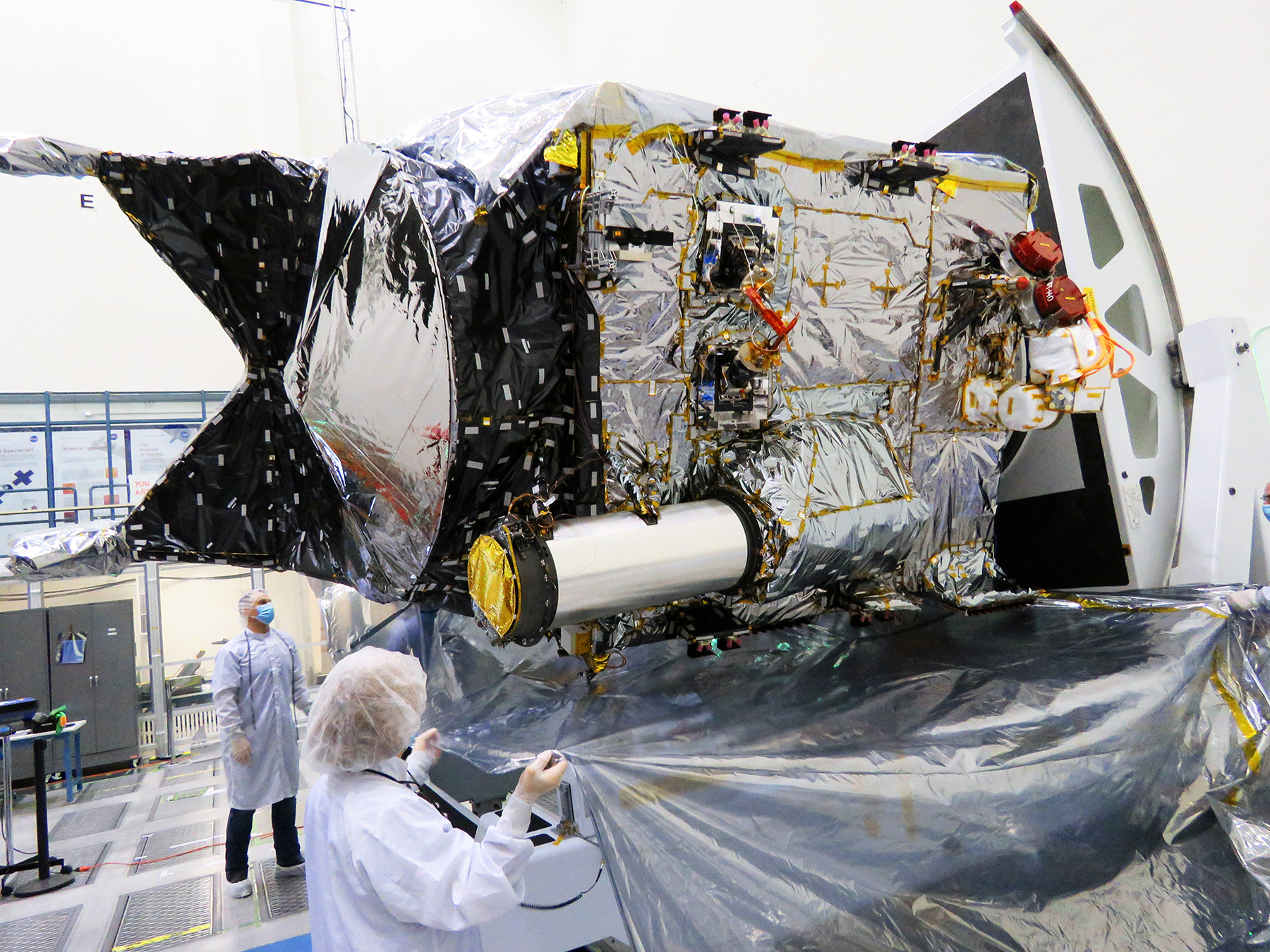
DSOC's flight transceiver can be identified by its large tube-like sunshade on the Psyche spacecraft, as seen here inside a clean room at JPL.

Stored onboard before launch, the short ultra-high definition video features an orange tabby cat named Taters, the pet of a JPL employee, chasing a laser pointer. Overlaid graphics illustrate several features from the tech demo, such as Psyche's orbital path, Palomar's telescope dome, and technical information about the laser and its data bit rate. Taters' heart rate, color, and breed are also on display.

The spacecraft is testing an experimental laser communication technology called Deep Space Optical Communications (DSOC). It is hoped that the device will increase spacecraft communications performance and efficiency by 10 to 100 times over conventional means. The DSOC experiment is NASA's first demonstration of optical communications beyond the Earth–Moon system. DSOC is a system that consists of a flight laser transceiver, a ground laser transmitter, and a ground laser receiver. New technologies have been implemented in each of these elements. The transceiver is mounted on the Psyche spacecraft. The DSOC technology demonstration began shortly after launch and continued as the spacecraft traveled from Earth to its gravity-assist flyby of Mars in 2026. DSOC has showcased its capabilities by sending data at up to 2 megabits per second, from distances beyond the orbit of Mars. DSOC operations proceeded for one year after launch, with extended-mission opportunities in 2025. Palomar Observatory's Hale Telescope received the high-rate data downlink from the DSOC flight transceiver.

The Discovery program solicitation offered mission projects an extra $30 M if they would host and test the 25 kilograms (55 lb) DSOC unit, which needs about 75 Watts. It is hoped to advance DSOC to technology readiness level 6. The test-runs of the laser equipment occurred over distances of 0.2 to 2.7 astronomical units (AU) on the outward-bound probe. The first successful test of the system occurred on December 11, 2023, when a cat video of an employee's cat playing with a laser pointer was streamed back to Earth from a distance of 31 million kilometers. The video signal took 101 seconds to reach Earth, sent at the system's maximum bit rate of 267 megabits per second (Mbps). On the night of December 4, the project demonstrated downlink bit rates of 62.5 Mbit/s, 100 Mbit/s, and 267 Mbit/s, which is comparable to broadband internet download speeds. The team was able to download a total of 1.3 terabits of data during that time. As a comparison, NASA's Magellan mission to Venus downlinked 1.2 terabits during its entire mission from 1990 to 1994. During a test on April 8, 2024, the spacecraft transmitted data at a maximum rate of 25 Mbit/s over a distance of 1.5 AU. This easily surpassed the project's goal of proving that at least 1 Mbit/s was possible at the distance of 226 million kilometres (1.51 AU).

Initial results and further plans have been published as of early 2025. Downlink was demonstrated up to 2.7 AU, with rates that depend on distance but exceed 6.25 Mbit/second. Uplink was demonstrated at a fixed rate of 1.8 kbit/s over distances of 0.2–3.3 AU.

==== Flight hardware ====
The DSOC flight laser transceiver features a near-infrared laser transmitter to send high-rate data to the ground system, and a sensitive photon-counting camera to receive a ground-transmitted laser. The transceiver's 8.6-inch (22-centimeter) aperture telescope is mounted on an assembly of struts and actuators that stabilizes the optics from spacecraft vibrations. The flight hardware is fitted with a sunshade and protrudes from the side of the spacecraft, making it one of Psyche's easily identifiable features.

==== Ground systems ====
A high-power near-infrared laser transmitter at JPL's Table Mountain facility near Wrightwood, California, acts as an uplink by transmitting a modulated laser beam to the flight transceiver to demonstrate the transmission of low-rate data. The uplink laser also acts as a beacon for the flight transceiver to lock onto. The downlink data sent back by the DSOC transceiver on Psyche is collected by the 200-inch (5.1-meter) Hale Telescope at Caltech's Palomar Observatory in San Diego County, California, using a sensitive superconducting nanowire photon-counting receiver to demonstrate high-rate data transfer.

JPL has also experimented with adding mirrors to some of its existing RF antennas of the NASA Deep Space Network. This can allow simultaneous radio and optical communication with a spacecraft. These experimental antennas have successfully received optical downlink signals from Psyche.

== Operations ==
=== Launch and trajectory ===
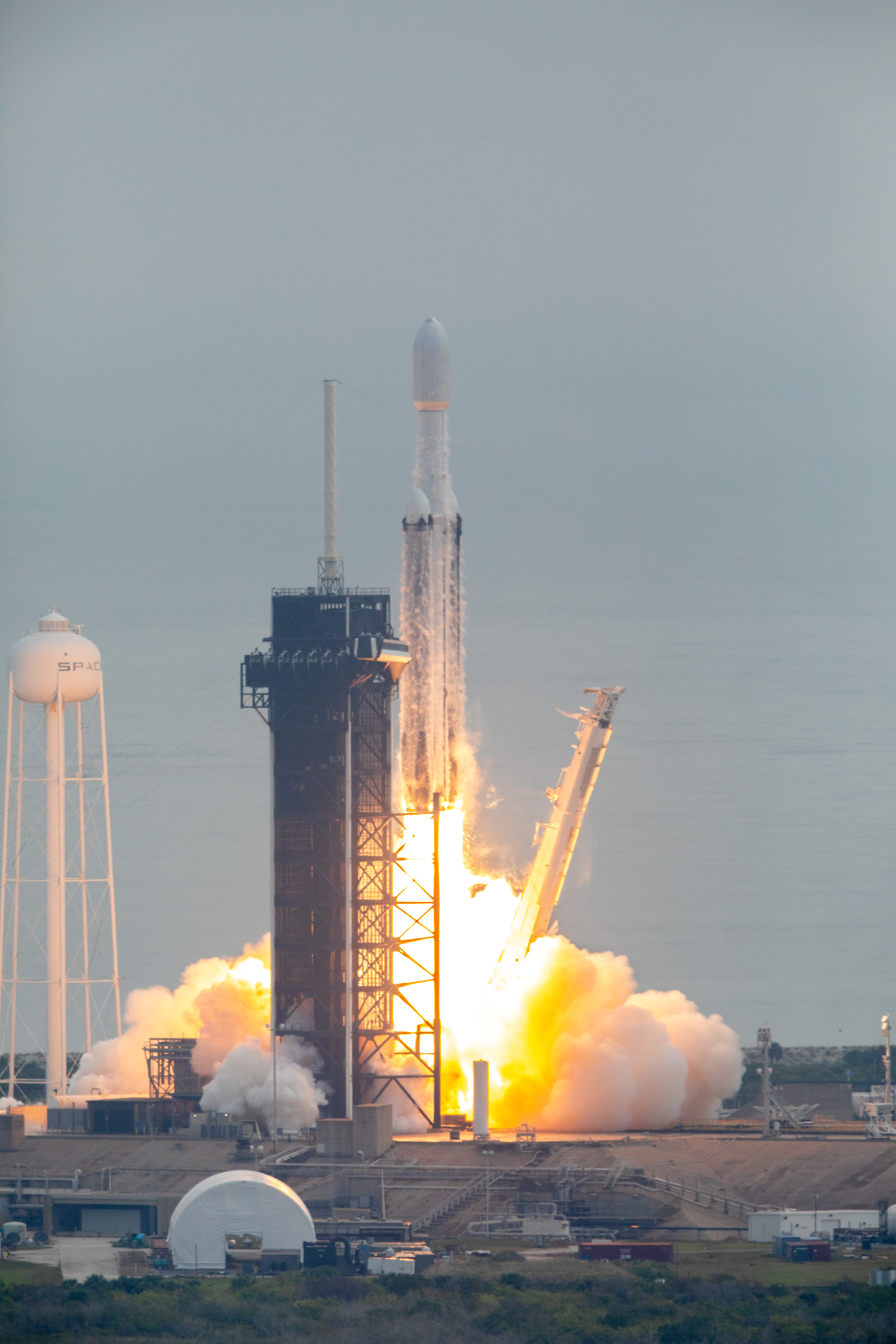
A Falcon Heavy launches Psyche at 14:19 UTC, Oct. 13, 2023

Psyche's launch period opened at October 5, 2023, with instantaneous launch windows every day until October 25. On 28 September, NASA announced that the launch would be delayed by a week due to issues found with the spacecraft's thrusters, moving the launch date from October 5 to October 12. The launch was delayed an additional day to October 13 due to bad weather.

Psyche launched on October 13, 2023, at 14:19 UTC, on a Falcon Heavy rocket from Launch Pad 39A at Kennedy Space Center. This was the eighth Falcon Heavy launch, and the first one for NASA. The two side boosters used in the mission made their fourth flight; they landed back at Cape Canaveral a few minutes after liftoff, to be reused on future flights, including the launch of Europa Clipper in 2024. The core stage of the rocket was expended. The Psyche spacecraft was released from the upper stage of the rocket about an hour after liftoff. A carrier wave signal from the spacecraft was received by ground controllers just after separation, providing information on spacecraft status prior to solar array deployment. Full communication with the spacecraft was established at 15:50 am UTC. The spacecraft then began a 100-day commissioning phase, during which all systems and instruments are tested and calibrated.

The cost of the launch was US$117 million.

=== Mars flyby ===
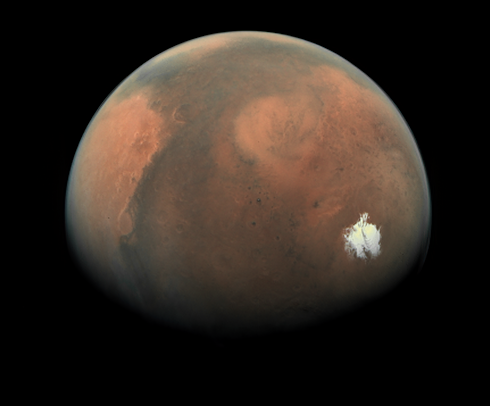
A gibbous image of Mars, photographed during the flyby on 15 May 2026

On May 15, 2026, Psyche successfully performed a gravity-assist maneuver at Mars, passing 4,609 km (2,864 mi) from the planet’s surface and positioning the spacecraft for its arrival at 16 Psyche in August 2029. The flyby shifted the spacecraft's orbital plane by about 1 degree relative to the Sun. During the flyby, instruments onboard Psyche were powered up for calibration, and took images of Mars from a high phase angle.

=== Orbit regimes ===
The approach sequence will begin in May 2029, when the first navigation images and measurements of 16 Psyche will be taken, the asteroid still just a few pixels wide. The spacecraft will then use its electric propulsion system to position itself to be captured by the asteroid's gravity, which is expected to occur in late July 2029. At this point, the first close-up images of 16 Psyche will be taken, with the asteroid appearing about 500 pixels across. Over the next 20 days the spacecraft will maneuver itself to enter the first of four science orbits.

Psyche is scheduled to enter orbit around 16 Psyche in August 2029. The spacecraft will orbit the asteroid at four different altitudes, which are named alphabetically from highest (A) to lowest (D). In the original mission plan, the spacecraft would progress through the orbits sequentially from highest to lowest. After the 2022 launch delay, the mission plan was updated to reflect the new 2029 arrival date, which meant the spacecraft would arrive at the asteroid at a different point in its orbit around the Sun. In the new mission plan, Psyche will initially enter Orbit A, then descend to Orbit B1, then Orbit D, back out to Orbit C, and finally it will move out to Orbit B2 (the second portion of Orbit B). This redesign ensures that the asteroid's surface is correctly illuminated by the Sun during Orbit B.

Its first regime, Orbit A, will see the spacecraft enter a 700 km (430 mi) orbit for magnetic field characterization and preliminary mapping for a duration of 56 days. It will then descend to Orbit B, set at 303 km (188 mi) altitude for 92 days, for topography and magnetic field characterization. It will then descend to Orbit D, which is the lowest orbit at 75 km (47 mi) and is also uniquely inclined to allow direct view of the asteroid's equator (compared to the other orbits that go around its poles), for 100 days to determine the chemical composition of the surface using its gamma-ray and neutron spectrometers. After that it will ascend to Orbit C at 190 km (120 mi) altitude for 100 days to perform gravity investigations and continue magnetic field observations. Finally, the orbiter will return to Orbit B for 100 days, to finish mapping the portion of the asteroid's surface that was under darkness during the first portion of Orbit B. It will also acquire continued imaging, gravity, and magnetic field mapping. In total, the prime mission is expected to last 26 months, ending in November 2031. At the end of the mission, the spacecraft will be left in orbit around the asteroid.

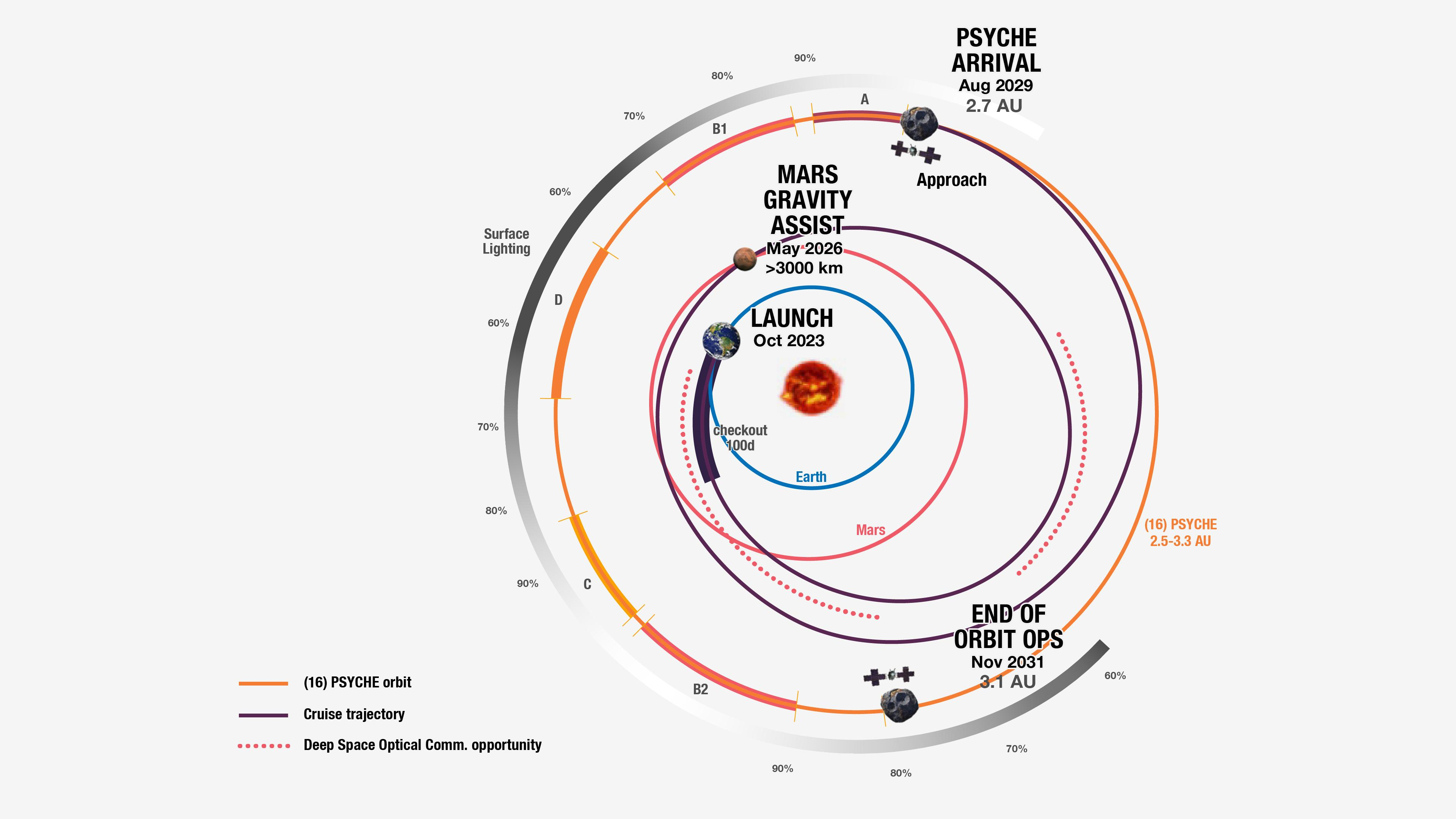
Mission plan of Psyche

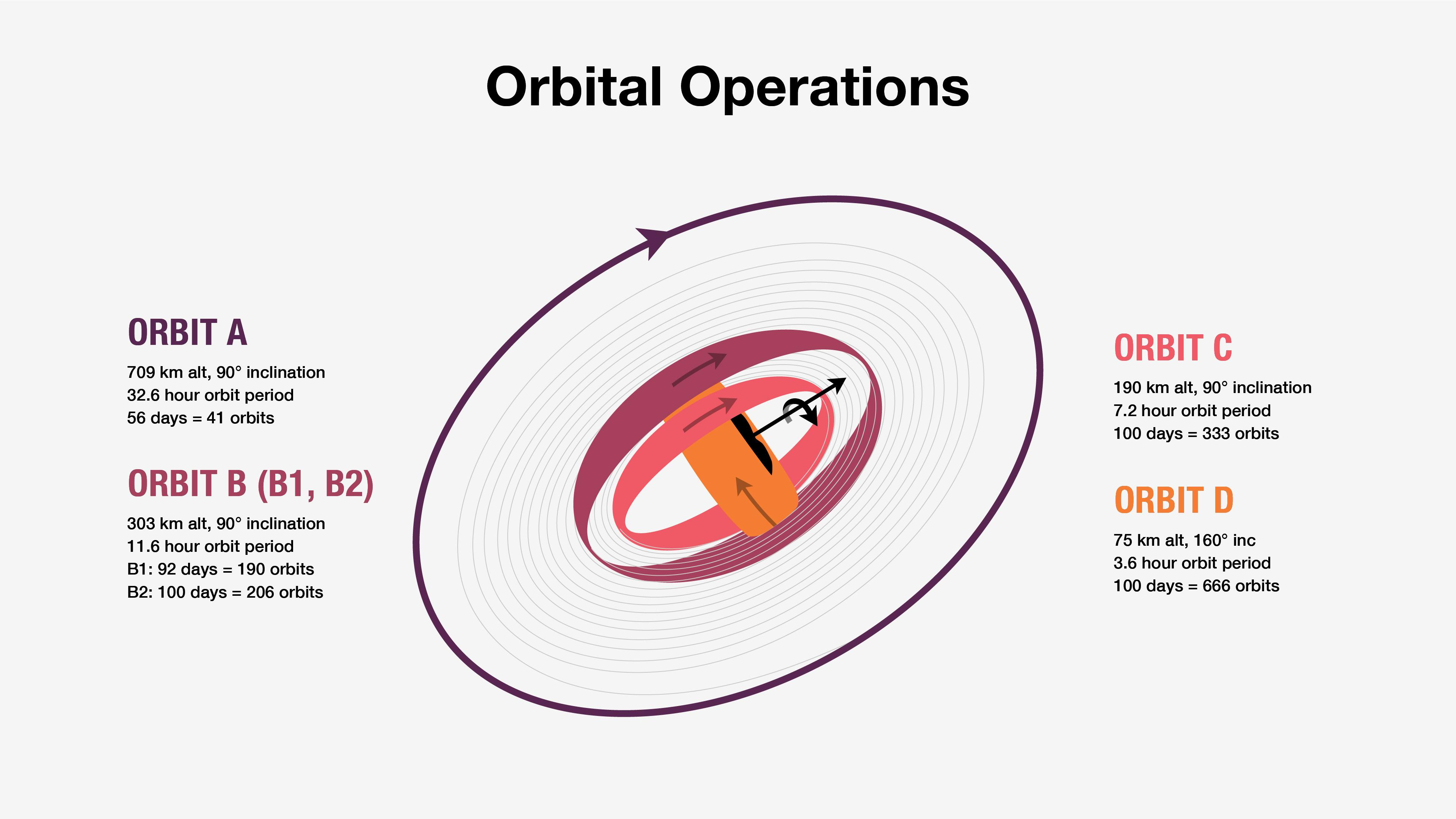
Orbital operations of Psyche

Orbit regimes
Orbit regime	Date (UTC)	Duration (day)	Orbital period (hour)	Altitude (km)	Inclination (degree)	Transfer to next orbit (day)	Mission
Orbit A	August 2029	56	32.8	700	90	17	Magnetic field characterization and preliminary mapping
Orbit B1	October 2029	92	11.6	303	90	98	Topography and magnetic field characterization
Orbit D	May 2030	100	3.6	75	160		Surface chemical composition determination
Orbit C	January 2031	100	7.2	190	90		Gravity investigations and Magnetic field observations
Orbit B2	May 2031	100	11.6	303	90		Topography and magnetic field characterization

Animation of Psyche's orbit

Around the Sun

Around 16 Psyche

Psyche · 16 Psyche · Earth · Mars · Sun

=== Ground stations for laser link ===
The laser beams from the spacecraft will be received by a ground telescope at Palomar Observatory in California. Laser beams to the spacecraft will be sent from a smaller telescope at JPL Table Mountain Facility.

== Construction and pre-launch testing ==
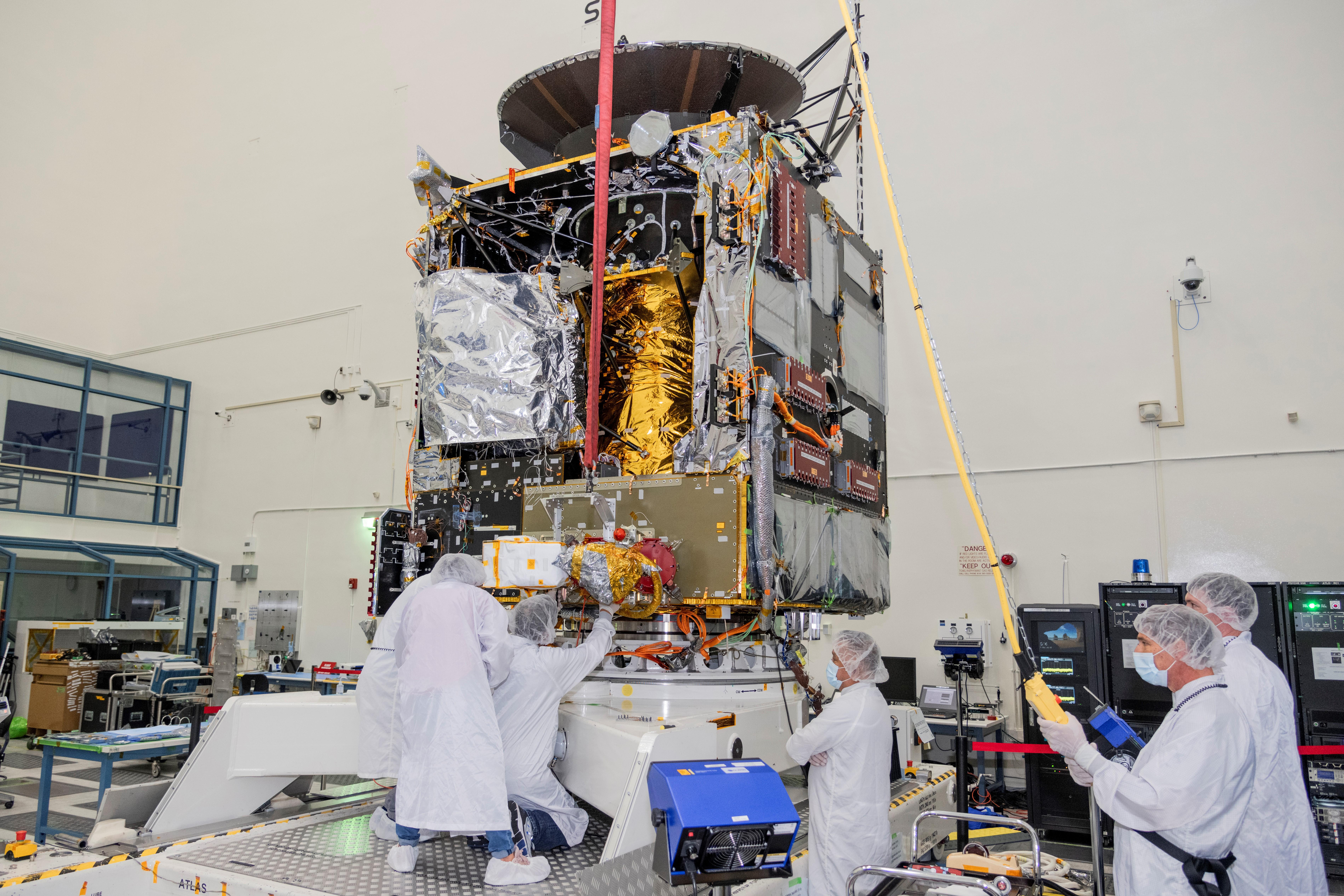
Psyche's thruster integration underway

Testing began on the spacecraft in December 2021. These tests included but were not limited to electromagnetic testing and TVAC, or thermal vacuum chamber testing. The electromagnetic testing was conducted to ensure that the electronics and magnetic components that make up the spacecraft will not interfere with each other while conducting the mission. The TVAC testing was conducted inside the 85- by 25-foot vacuum chamber at JPL's facility in Southern California, which replicates the lack of air in space. This allows for the engineers and scientist to observe the effects of the space environment on the orbiter. Inside the TVAC, the JPL employees can observe how well the spacecraft reacts to harsh conditions. Without air surrounding the spacecraft, the heating and cooling of the unit is affected. The spacecraft will be hot in the hours after launch, while it is still close to Earth and facing the Sun, especially with its electronics running, and later, when the spacecraft gets farther from the Sun, it faces intense cold, especially when flying in 16 Psyche's shadow. Vibration tests of the spacecraft by scientists and engineers ensure it can survive the extreme conditions of the rocket launch. They also performed shock testing to ensure the spacecraft could survive the shock of separation from the rocket's second stage. Finally, they performed acoustic testing on the craft. The sound of the launch can be so violent that it can damage the hardware, so intense acoustic testing was performed to ensure mission success.
