= Deep Space Optical Communications =

Spacecraft communication system using lasers

Deep Space Optical Communications Demonstration
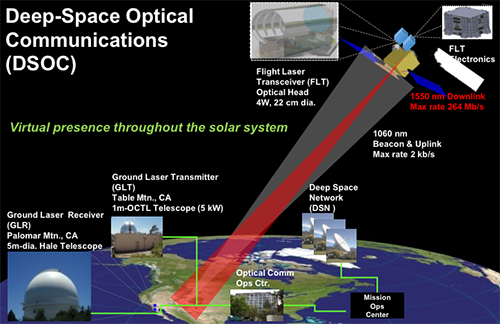
- Scheme of the architecture for the planned Deep Space Optical Communications (DSOC) prototype

Program overview
- Country: United States
- Organization: NASA
- Manager: Jet Propulsion Laboratory
- Purpose: Laser communication in space
- Status: Ongoing

Program history
- Duration: 2017; 9 years ago–present

Deep Space Optical Communications (DSOC) is a laser space communication system in operation that improved communications performance 10 to 100 times over radio frequency technology without incurring increases in mass, volume or power. DSOC is capable of providing high bandwidth downlinks from beyond cislunar space.

The project is led by NASA's Jet Propulsion Laboratory (JPL) in Pasadena, California. In April 2024, the system successfully communicated with the Psyche spacecraft at a distance of 140 million miles.

== Overview ==
Future human expeditions may require a steady stream of high-definition imagery, live video feeds, and real-time data transmission across deep space to enable timely guidance and updates during the long-distance journeys. Even at its maximum data rate of 5.2 megabits per second (Mb/s), the Mars Reconnaissance Orbiter (MRO) requires 7.5 hours to transmit all of its onboard recorder, and 1.5 hours to send a single HiRISE image to be processed back on Earth. New high-resolution hyperspectral imagers put further demands on their communications system, requiring even higher data rates.

The precursor technology demonstration for this optical transceiver was launched in 2023 on board NASA's robotic Psyche mission to study the giant metal asteroid known as 16 Psyche. The laser beams from the spacecraft will be received by the 200 inch (5 m) Hale Telescope at Palomar Observatory in California. Laser beams to the spacecraft will be sent from a smaller telescope at the Table Mountain Observatory in California.

First light was achieved on 14 November 2023.

The first video successfully beamed from space using the technology occurred on 11 December 2023 from a record-setting 19 million miles away (31 million kilometers, or about 80 times the Earth-Moon distance).

== Design ==
This new technology will employ advanced lasers in the near-infrared region (1.55 μm) of the electromagnetic spectrum. The architecture is based on transmitting a laser beacon from Earth to assist line-of-sight stabilization and pointing back of the downlink laser beam. In addition, efficient codes are used for error free communications. The system must correct for background noise (scattered light) from Earth's atmosphere and the Sun. Given the current hardware (1 m ground transmit, 5 m ground receive, 22 cm spacecraft telescope), the uplink is expected to reach 292 kbit/s at a distance of 0.4 astronomical units (60,000,000 km; 37,000,000 mi), with the downlink reaching 100 Mbit/s at the same distance. The transmitted beam-width is inversely proportional to the frequency used, so the shorter the wavelength used, the narrower and more focused a beam can be made. The downlink bandwidth will depend on the ground telescope diameter and will be less during daytime.

Three key DSOC technologies developed for the project include:

- a low-mass spacecraft disturbance isolation and pointing assembly for operating in the presence of spacecraft vibrational disturbance.
- a high-efficiency flight laser transmitter;
- a pair of high-efficiency photon counting detector arrays for the flight optical transceiver and the ground-based receiver (a telescope).

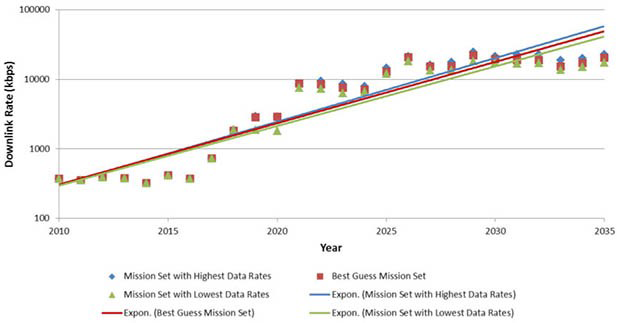
Data rates required for deep space missions in the coming decades

Flight laser transmitter	Ground systems
Laser: 4 W Wavelength: 1550 nm	Uplink: • Telescope (1 m) • 5 kW power • Wavelength 1064 nm
Telescope: 22 cm aperture Capable of pointing up to 3 degrees of Sun	Downlink: • 5 m telescope • Operates day or night • Can point within 12 degrees of Sun
Mass: <29 kg	
Power: <100 W	

== Psyche mission ==
A Deep Space Optical Communication demonstration is included with NASA's Psyche mission, launched on October 13, 2023. The Psyche spacecraft will explore the metal asteroid 16 Psyche, reaching the asteroid belt in 2029.

DSOC first light was achieved on November 14, 2023. The experiment successfully transmitted a 15-second ultra-high definition video on December 11 from a location 19 million miles away from Earth (31 million kilometers, or about 80 times the Earth-Moon distance). The pre-loaded video of a cat named Taters was sent at the system's maximum bit rate of 267 megabits per second (Mbps) and took 101 seconds to reach Earth. An additional test in July 2024 demonstrated communication over a distance of 467 million kilometers (290 million miles).

== See also ==
- Laser Communications Relay Demonstration – NASA payload launched in 2021
