= El Ali meteorite =

Somali meteorite

El Ali
- Type: Iron
- Group: IAB Complex
- Composition: 90% Fe, 9.52% Ni, 0.48% Co, 23 ppm Cr, 0.4 ppm Ir, 60.6 ppm Ga, 176 ppm Ge, 15.6 ppm As, 3.1 ppm Ru, 0.6 ppm W, 0.5 ppm Os, 2.5 ppm Pt, 302 ppm Cu, 1.4 ppm Au
- Country: Somalia
- Region: Hiran
- Coordinates: 4°17′17″N 44°53′54″E
- Observed fall: No
- Found date: in 2020 it was identified as a meteorite
- TKW: ~15,200 kilograms (16.8 short tons)
- Strewn field: No

The El Ali meteorite (Arabic) or Ceel Cali (Somali) (known traditionally by the locals as Shiid-Birood and recently by the finders as Nightfall), literally meaning, "Ali's Well," is a 15,150-kilogram (16.70-short-ton) meteorite that was known to the local population in Somalia for generations, but officially recognized as a meteorite only in 2020.

== Discovery and identification ==
El Ali was found in a limestone valley 15 kilometres north of El Ali at GPS location 4°17.281’N, 44°53.893’E in September 2020. Local pastoralists were aware of the rock for between five and seven generations, and it featured in songs, folklore, dances, and poems. The meteorite was brought to the attention of the international community by Kureym Mining and Rocks Company's staff who were prospecting for opals in the area. They identified the rock and started moving it to Mogadishu before the Somalia government intervened and released it back to the miners. The meteorite was then shipped to China where it was supposedly awaiting sale, as of November 2022.

It is an IAB meteorite.

== Mineral identification ==
In 2022, scientists from the University of Alberta identified two new minerals (elaliite and elkinstantonite) in a 70 gram piece of the meteorite. The minerals were identified by Andrew Locock, the head of the university's electron microprobe laboratory.

Synthetic versions of both minerals had previously been produced in a French laboratory in the 1980s, but International Mineralogical Association rules meant they could not be approved as an official mineral until they were found in a natural sample.

== Curation ==
The location of the main mass of the meteorite is uncertain; it was last recorded being shipped to China, presumably for sale. Small samples are held at the University of Arizona, the University of Alberta, and UC Los Angeles. The future of the meteorite is undecided.
