= Guriel District =

Guriel District Degmada Guriceel الثلاثاء
- District
- countryside of Guriel District
- Country: Somalia
- Regional State: Galmudug
- Capital: Guriel

Area
  - Total: 52 km^{2} (20 sq mi)

Population (2020)
  - Total: 102,000
- Time zone: UTC+3 (EAT)

Guriel District (Somali: Degmada Guriceel) is one of the districts in the central Galguduud region of Somalia. Its capital Guriel is the second largest city in the central Galguduud region.

== Villages, towns, and cities ==
Guriel district has 120 villages, towns and city.

List of villages, towns and the city of Guriel of Guriel district.

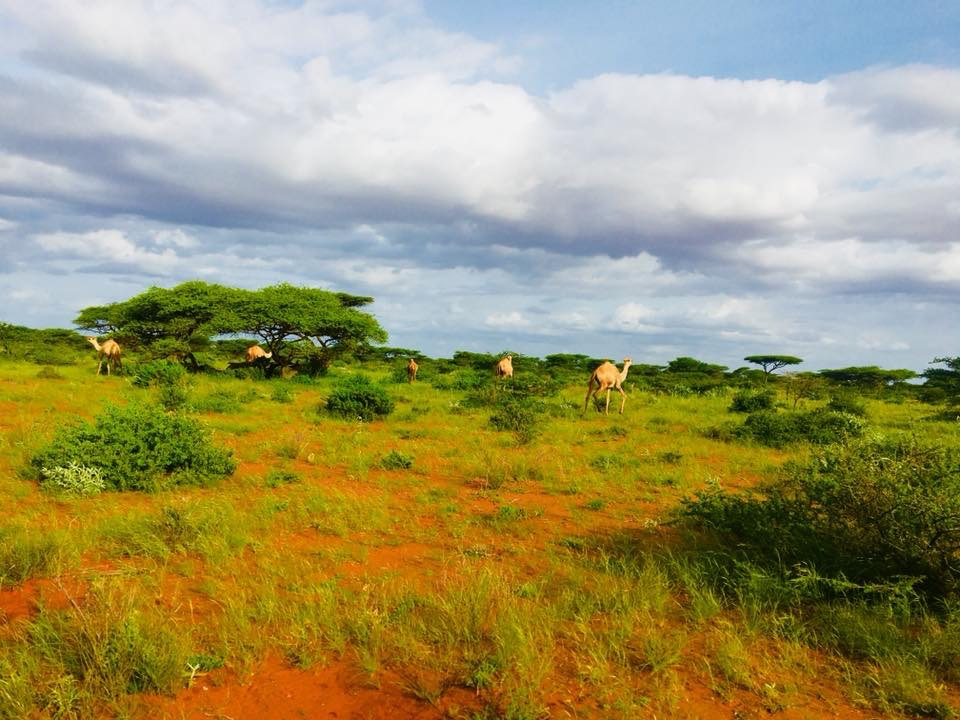
Outskirts of Guriel City.

- Guriel (Capital)
- Wara-Dhumale
- El Dhere
- Dhagahyale
- Diriye hasan
- Doyale
- Cali hasan
- Barlef
- Dabare
- Cali Jir
- Godwil
- Iluule
- Ramale
- El Baraf
- Gala-qoryale
- Bulbul
- Kora goys
- Habar-Cirir
- Ina Cabad
- Baa
- Guled bogcad
- Gofado
- Xajinle
- Dabayodley
- Lanle
- Marodile
- Labiley
- Yanyaley
- El-habred
- Benyaley
- Dhanforaris
- Qotalo
- Balihowd
- balidaqaf
- Xabadale
- Alalale
- Foley
- Marere
- Jicle
- Xersi lugey
- Dumaye
- Ilix
- Afcegag
- Bar Siyable
- Tosan Dher
- Sina Dhaqo
- Labi Dulle
- Isma Dhaqo
- lamo Fanax
- Tulo Cano
- Galqoryaale
- Yibirsuge
- Gabun
- Darood Ceynshe
- Qaydar
- Ribadle
- Lan Ijaabo
- Buhod
- Dabeyl
- Kadhakole
- Ariqarof
- Balli-Dhig
- Garasle
- Balli Sharaf
- Xodale
- Golangole
- Miiryahudle
- Idow
- Hertis
- Xulfadi axmed gurey
- Shed Gadud
- Cilmi Joowle
- Dudubley
- Labi Hiraan
- Dadale
- Odale
- Balicad
- Cilmi jowle
- Lamo
- Walomoge
- Jora Jowhar
- Salaxdhadhab
- Bobdhere
- Bole
- Dabare
- Bulo Shiikh
- Lebi Dulo
- Degayare
- Farmalagle
- Goragiahor

And many other villages, towns and cities.

== Gallery ==
Guriceel District Countryside

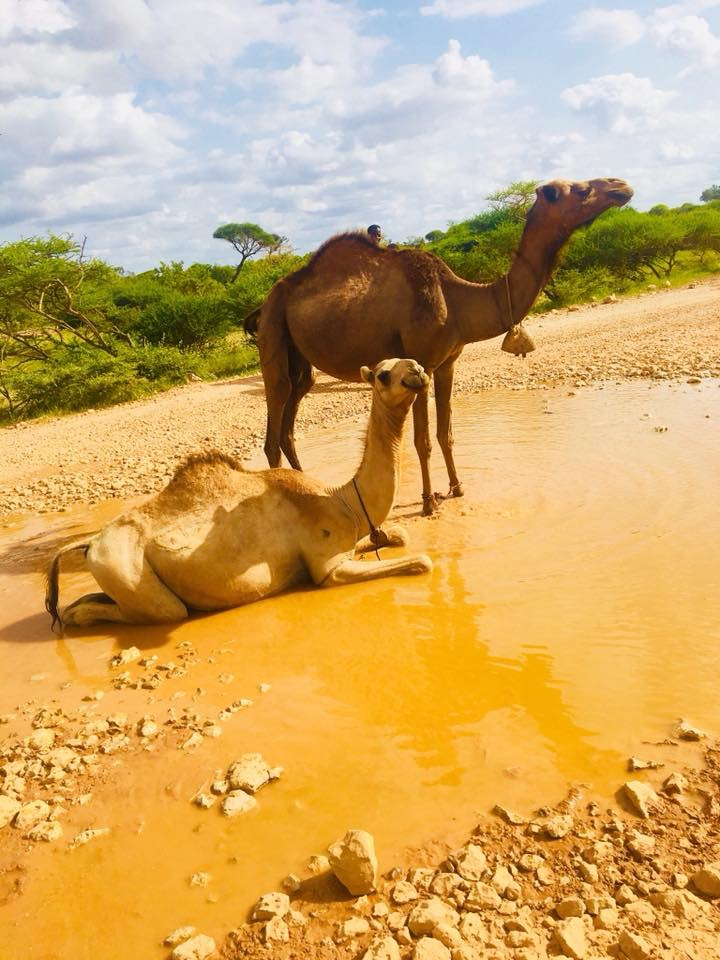

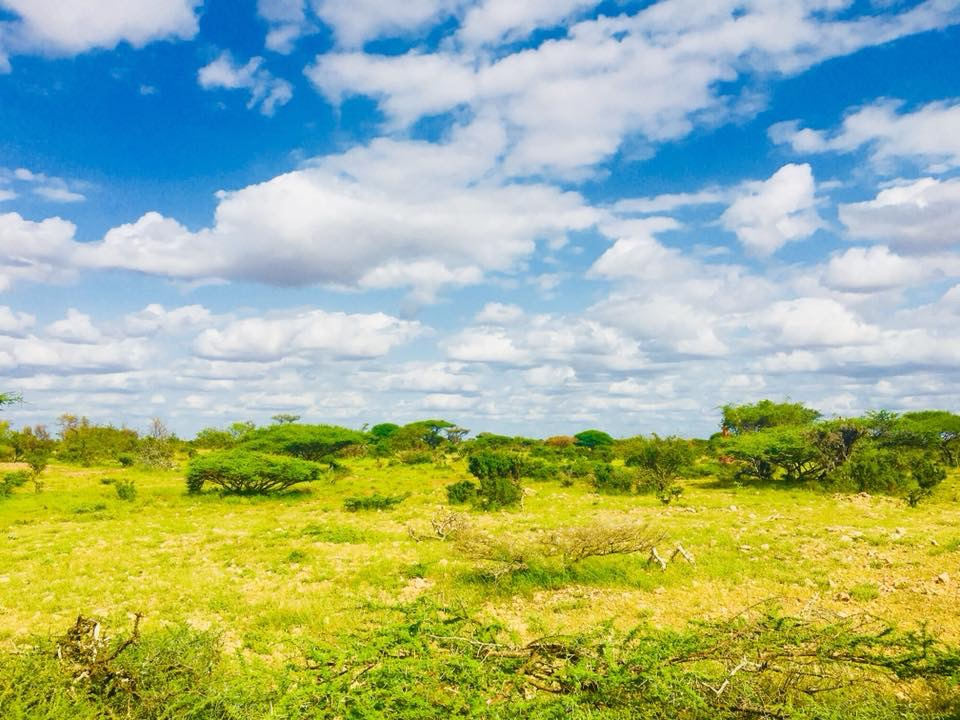

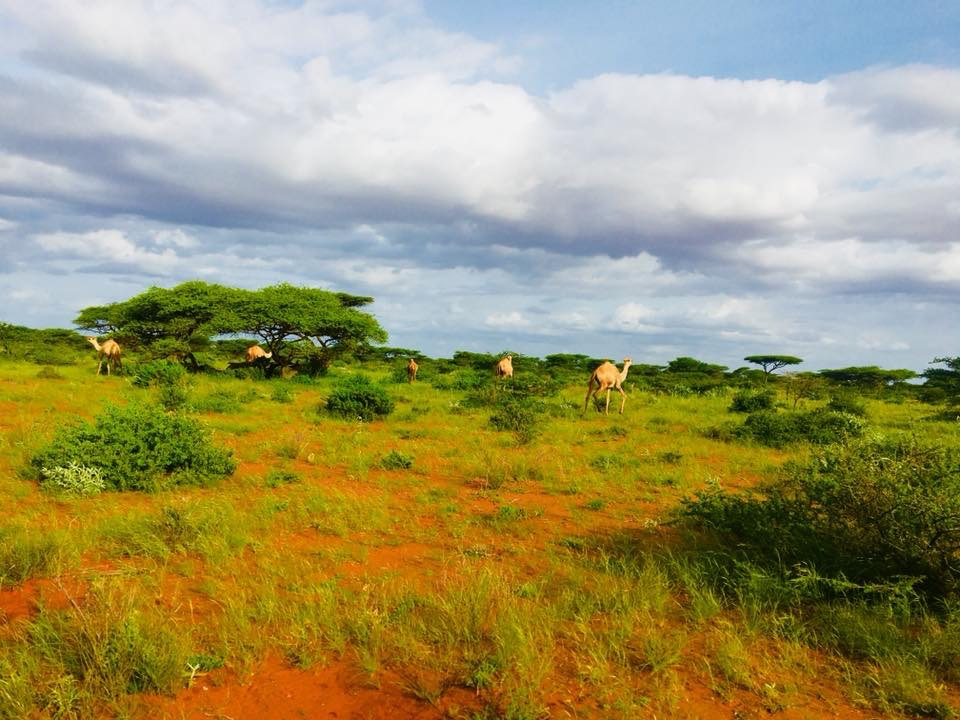

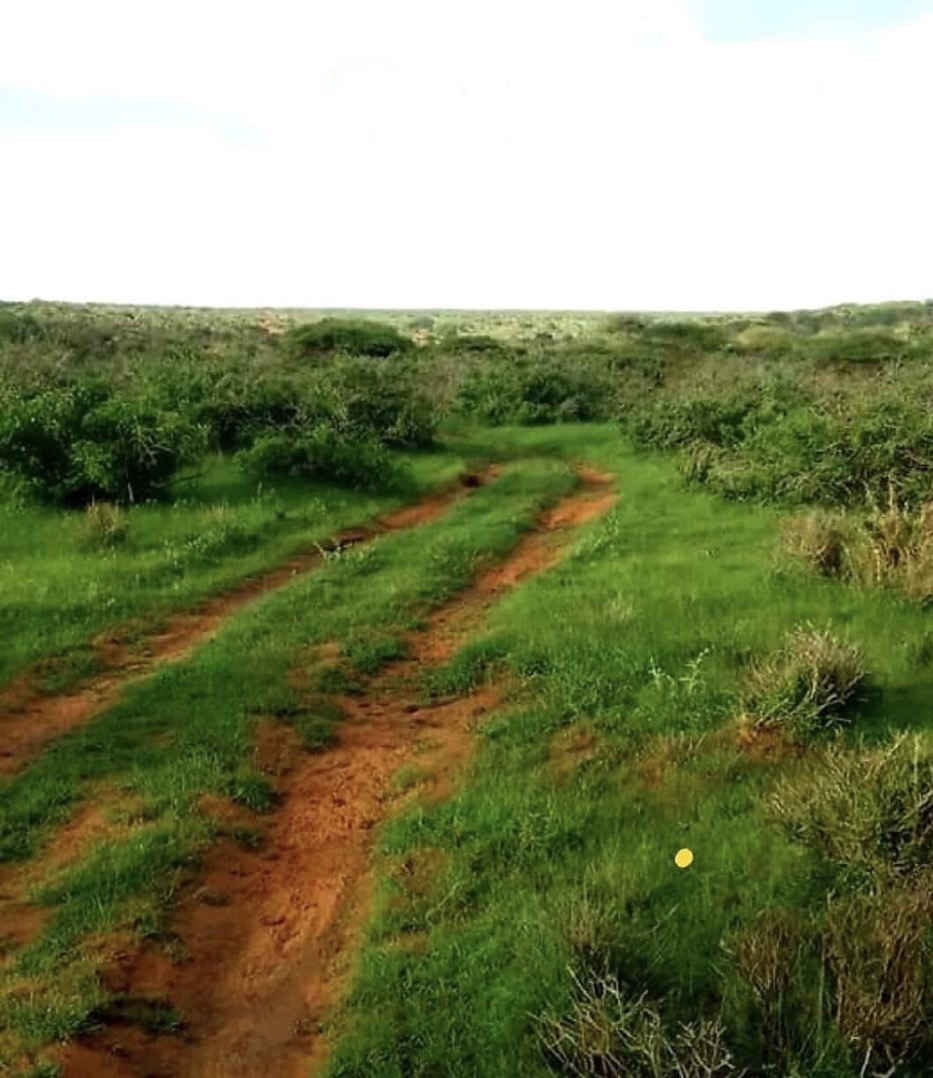

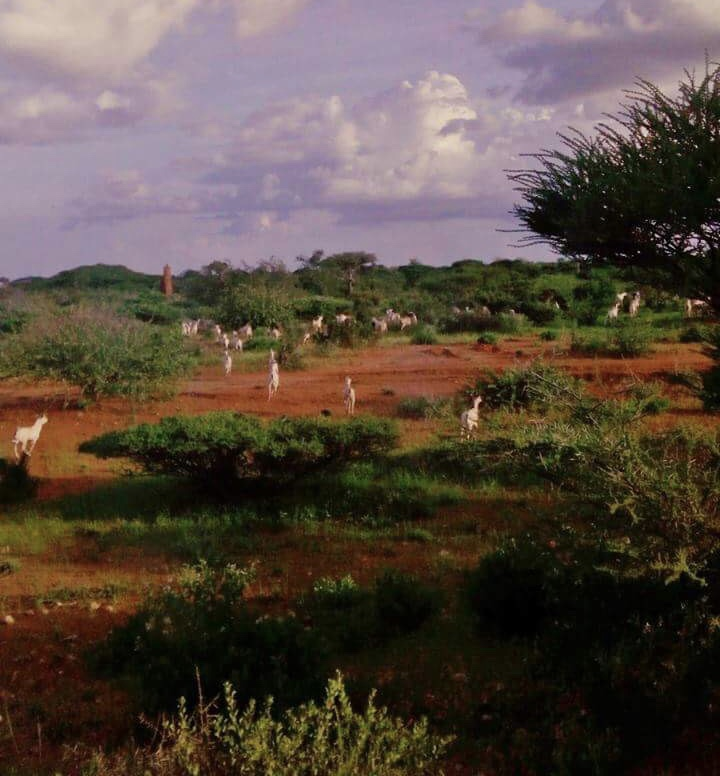
