= El Gambole =

Town in Middle Shabelle Region, Hirshabelle State, Somalia

Gambole
- Town
- Location in Somalia
- Coordinates: 3°4′32″N 45°10′55″E
- Country: Somalia
- State: Hirshabelle
- Region: Middle Shabelle
- District: El Gambole
- Founded: 1920

Government
  - Mayor: Muhammad Ali Abdullahi
- Elevation: 110 m (360 ft)

Population (2021)
  - Urban: 13,000
  - Rural: 25,000
- Time zone: UTC+3 (EAT)

El Gambole (Somali: Gamboole) is a town located in Middle Shabelle, Hirshabelle State in Somalia.

== History and Infrastructure ==
Gambole is historically notable for its traditional deep-water wells, which have historically served as critical water sources in the region. The engineering and construction of the water wells in Gambole, alongside neighboring regional wells such as Wambatta and Bardaale, are historically attributed to the technology of the Ajuran Sultanate (Ajuraan Empire). These water management systems remain essential to local pastoralist and agricultural livelihoods in the study area.

== Overview ==
Gambooletown is located 48 km (30 mi) North West of Jowhar and 112 km (70 mi) north of Mogadishu.
