= Dabbad =

Coordinates: 3°48′32″N 45°22′58″E

Dabadd, locally known Dabadeey, is a small settlement in the Buq Aqable District of the Hiiraan Region, in central Somalia. It is situated within the broader Shebelle River basin, an area characterized by a mixture of agricultural land, pastoral areas, and rural settlements.
