= Abtisame =

Somali clan

- Hawiye Somali Clan
- Minister of Defence of Somalia during UN Trust Territory of Somalia
- Ethnicity: (Somalia) Somali
- Location: Somalia
- Descended from: Gaaljecel
- Parent tribe: Doorwaaq
- Branches: Jid Farah; Haji Salah
- Language: (Somalia) Somali
- Religion: Sunni Islam

Abtisame Somali: (Abtisame) Italian: (Aptisane) is a Somali clan, a division of Gaalje'el clan, they live on Hiran and Middle region..

== Clan Tree ==
- Gaaljecel
  - Soranle
    - Arsandheli
      - Dorwaq
        - Abtisame
          - Jid Farah
            - Bayle
            - Citif
            - Warenyo
            - Diinlood
            - Shige
              - Cabdulle
              - Dhaayow
              - Maxamed
              - Dhuubane
              - Ciise
          - HajiSalah
            - Abki Caalin
            - Dumal Weyne
            - Irab Alla
            - Yibidhaal
