= Upper Shabelle =

Upper Shabelle (Italian: Alto Uebi Scebeli; also Alto Scebeli; English: Upper Webi Shebelle or Upper Shebelle) was a historical administrative area in Somalia during the Italian colonial and later United Nations trusteeship periods. The name referred to an area associated with the Shebelle River, and its boundaries and administrative organization changed over time.

During the Italian colonial period, Alto Uebi Scebeli was one of the eight regional commissariats of Italian Somaliland listed in the contemporary Enciclopedia Italiana.
