= Buq Aqable District =

- District
- Country: Somalia
- Region: Hiran
- Time zone: UTC+3 (EAT)

Buq Aqable District is a district in the central Hiran region of Somalia. Its capital is Buq Aqable.

== History ==
The Buq Aqable area was elevated to district level by the Hirshabelle cabinet on the 4th of June 2023.
