= Beledweyne District =

Beledweyne
- District
- Nickname: Green region
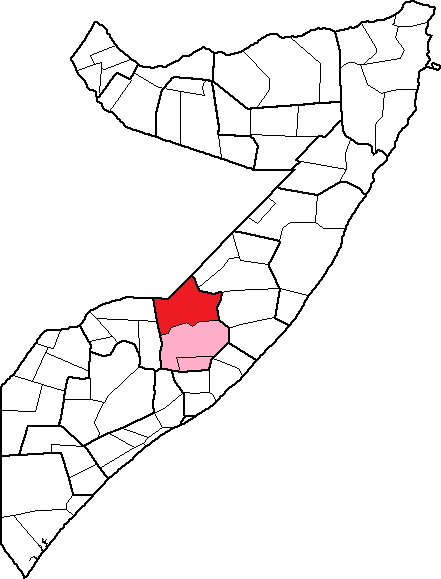
- Country: Somalia
- Region: Hiran
- Capital: Beledweyne

Government
  - Governor: Osman Dhubow
- Time zone: UTC+3 (EAT)

Beledweyne District (Somali: Degmada Beledweyne) is a district in the central Hiran region of Somalia. Its capital lies at Beledweyne. The district is mostly inhabited by the Hawadle.

== Settlements ==
Luuq Jeelow.Bar Medeghe.Raangaabo.Garas Abeer. Baar-Qulay.Jaadle. Ceelbaar. Caag Xoog
