= El Ali District =

City in Somalia

El Ali Degmada Ceel Cali
- District
- Location in Somalia.
- Coordinates: 4°12′0″N 44°59′0″E
- Country: Somalia
- Region: Hiran
- Time zone: UTC+3 (EAT)

El Ali (Somali: Degmada Ceel Cali) is a district in the central Hiran region of Somalia. El Ali has a population of around 230,000 inhabitants. The broader El Ali District has a total population of 543,345 residents. El Ali means (Ali's well). El-Ali's residents largely belong to the Galje'el (or Gaaljecel) sub-clan of Dirisame.

== History ==
The El Ali meteorite was identified by Kureym Mining and Rocks Company's staff in 2020 and trucked towards Mogadishu. Prior to that, the rock had been celebrated for between five and seven generations, featuring in songs, folklore, dances, and poems. In 2022, the mineral elaliite was named after El Ali after being identified in the meteorite by scientists at the University of Alberta.

== Location ==
It is situated 75 km south west of Beledweyne, the capital of the Hiiraan region.

== Demographics ==
El Ali is predominantly inhabited by people from the Somali ethnic group, with the Dirisame sub-clan of the main Gaaljecel clan especially well represented.
