= Mataban District =

Matabaan District Degmada Matabaan
- District
- Location in Somalia
- Coordinates: 5°12′N 45°32′E
- Country: Somalia
- State: Hirshabelle
- Region: Hiran

Government
  - Type: Mayor-Council-Commission

Area
  - Total: 9.7 sq mi (25 km^{2})
- Elevation: 330 ft (100 m)
- Time zone: UTC+3 (EAT)
- Area code: 252

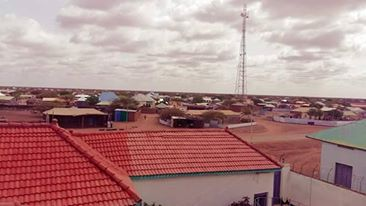
Mataban

Mataban District (Somali: Degmada Matabaan) is a district in the central Hiran (known as Lanqeyrta Mataban) is a region of Hirshabelle state of Somalia.

It is 75 km from Beledweyne, the capital of Hiran.
