= Mukayle =

Town in Hiran, Somalia

- Location in Somalia.
- Coordinates: 3°49′6″N 45°13′15″E
- Country: Somalia
- Region: Hiran
- Time zone: UTC+3 (EAT)

Mukayle is a town in the central Hiran region of Somalia.
