= Somalia Water and Land Information Management Project =

FAO-SWALIM (Somalia Water and Land Information Management) is a long running project implemented by the Food and Agriculture Organization of the United Nations (FAO) in Somalia. Established in 2002 in response to the near total collapse of Somalia's natural resource data systems during decades of civil conflict, SWALIM collects, manages, and disseminates critical information on water and land resources to support humanitarian response, disaster preparedness, and sustainable development planning. Through a network of monitoring systems, remote sensing, hydro-geological assessments, and early warning tools, SWALIM provides reliable data to Somali government institutions, UN agencies, NGOs, and development partners, helping communities better prepare for floods, droughts, and other climate-related shocks.
