= Jalalaqsi =

- Town
- Location in Somalia
- Coordinates: 3°24′0″N 45°35′0″E
- Country: Somalia
- State: Hirshabelle
- Region: Hiiraan

Area
  - Total: 30 km^{2} (12 sq mi)
- Time zone: UTC+3 (EAT)

Jalalaqsi (Jalalassi) is a town in the south-central Hiran province of Somalia.

== Demographics ==
Jalalaqsi has a population of around 60,800 inhabitants. The Xawaadle clan is the most populous in the region.

== History ==
In the mid-1988s there were four refugee camps with a population of around 85,000 Somalis in Jalalaqsi. At that time it was the third largest settlement in Somalia after Mogadishu and Hargeisa.

== Climate ==
Climate data for Jalalaqsi
Month	Jan	Feb	Mar	Apr	May	Jun	Jul	Aug	Sep	Oct	Nov	Dec	Year
Mean daily maximum °C (°F)	35.6 (96.1)	37.0 (98.6)	32.5 (90.5)	37.5 (99.5)	34.8 (94.6)	33.0 (91.4)	32.0 (89.6)	32.7 (90.9)	34.3 (93.7)	34.9 (94.8)	35.4 (95.7)	35.0 (95.0)	34.6 (94.2)
Mean daily minimum °C (°F)	22.0 (71.6)	21.9 (71.4)	23.2 (73.8)	23.7 (74.7)	23.2 (73.8)	22.3 (72.1)	21.8 (71.2)	21.6 (70.9)	22.3 (72.1)	22.7 (72.9)	22.5 (72.5)	22.1 (71.8)	22.4 (72.4)
Average precipitation mm (inches)	2 (0.1)	2 (0.1)	22 (0.9)	77 (3.0)	81 (3.2)	8 (0.3)	15 (0.6)	5 (0.2)	10 (0.4)	81 (3.2)	59 (2.3)	12 (0.5)	374 (14.8)
Source: Climate-Data.org

== Notable residents ==
- Hassan Sheikh Mohamoud, President of Somalia
- Farah Sh. Abdulkadir Mohamed, Minister for Education, Somalia
