= Buloburde =

- City
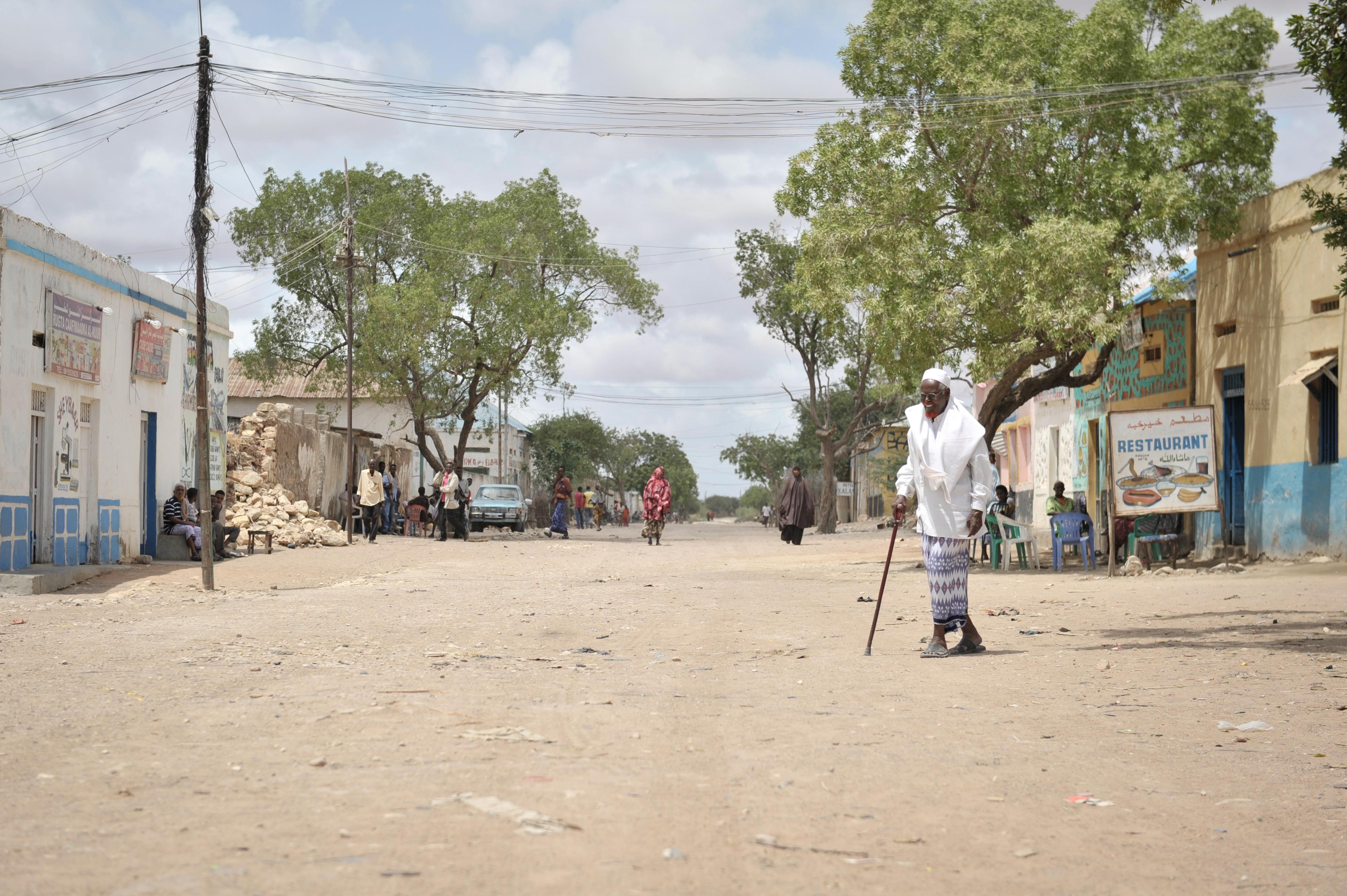
- Buloburde in 2014

- Location in Somalia
- Coordinates: 3°51′00″N 45°34′00″E
- Country: Somalia
- State: Hiraan State
- Region: Hiiraan

Area
  - Total: 40 km^{2} (15 sq mi)

Population
  - Total: 400,000
- Time zone: UTC+3 (EAT)

Buloburde, also spelled Buloburti or Bulobarde, is a city in Somalia's central Hiran region.

== Overview ==
Buloburde is situated along the Shabelle River. It is the center of the Buloburde District.

In March 2014, Somali Armed Forces, assisted by AMISOM troops, captured the town from Al-Shabaab. The offensive was part of an intensified military operation by the allied forces to remove the insurgent group from the remaining areas in southern Somalia under its control.

== Demographics ==
Buloburde has a population of around 20,500. The broader Buloburde District has a population of 210,120.
