= Hiran, Somalia =

Region of Somalia

Hiiraan Hiiraan هيران
- Region
- Location of Hiiraan State
- Coordinates: 4°47′N 45°27′E
- Country: Somalia
- State: Hirshabelle
- Capital: Beledweyne

Government
  - Type: Regional Government
  - Governor: Ali Jeyto Osman

Area
  - Total: 31,510 km^{2} (12,170 sq mi)

Population (2019)
  - Total: 2,566,400
  - Density: 81.45/km^{2} (210.9/sq mi)
- Time zone: UTC+3 (EAT)
- Area code: 252
- ISO 3166 code: SO-HI
- HDI (2021): 0.291 low · 16th of 18

Hiran (Somali: Hiiraan, Arabic: هيران) is an administrative region (gobol) in central Somalia and part of the Hirshabelle State.

== Overview ==
Hiran is bordered by the Somali Region of Ethiopia (or the 1908 Convention Line) to the northwest and the Somali provinces of Galgudud to the northeast, Middle Shebelle (Shabeellaha Dhexe) to the south, Lower Shebelle (Shabellaha Hoose) to the southwest, and Bay and Bakool to the west. It is approximately 31,510 km^{2}. The Shebelle River flows into Hiran from Ethiopia, coursing through the provincial capital of Beledweyne.

== Districts ==
Relation map.

According to the Somalia government's classification, Hiran Region consists of three districts:

1. Beledweyne District
2. Buloburde District
3. Jalalaqsi District

In May 2012, Governor Hiran appointed new governors for Mahas and Mataban Districts.

In August 2017, the Hirshabelle State, inaugurated the previous year, declared that where Hiran had previously had five districts, Beledweyne, Buloburde, Mahas, Jalalaqsi, and Mataban, it would have three new districts, Halgan, El Ali, Far-Libaax, bringing the number of districts to eight.

On 4 June 2023, the Hirshabelle State approved the elevation of six locations into the district level as part of efforts to expand local government administration. The new districts are Ali-Gadud Mosque, Raaga-Eelle, Burweyn, Buq Aqable, Hawadley and Moqokori, giving the following districts for Hiraan:

1. Ali-Gadud Mosque District
2. Beledweyne District
3. Buloburde District
4. Buq Aqable District
5. Burweyn District
6. El Ali District
7. Far-Libaax District
8. Halgan District
9. Hawadley District
10. Jalalaqsi District
11. Mahas District
12. Mataban District
13. Moqokori District
14. Raaga-Eelle District

== Universities ==
- Nile university
- Green-Hope University

== Governor ==
Name	Somali name	Term of office	
Name	Somali name	Took office	Left office
Hassan Abdulle Khalad	Xassan Cabdull Qalaad	1991	2003
Abdi Farah Laqanyo	Cabdi Faarax Laqanyo	2013?	Apr. 2014
Abdifatah Hassan Aflax	Cabdifataax Xasan Afrax	Apr. 2014	Dec. 2015
Yusuf Ahmed Hagar Dabageed	Yuusuf Axmed Xagar Dabageed	Dec. 2015	Oct. 2016
Omar Aden Ibrahim Badiyow	Cumar Aadan Ibraahim Baadiyoow	Oct. 2016	Sep. 2017
Ali Jeyte Osman	Cali Jeyte Cismaan	Sep. 2017	Apr. 2018
Abdulahi Ahmed Malin (Sufurow)	Cabdullaahi Axmed Maalin (Sufurow)	Apr. 2018	Sep. 2018
Yusuf Ahmed Hagar Dabageed	Yuusuf Axmed Xagar Dabageed	Sep. 2018	Jun. 2019
Ali Mohamed Arale		Jun. 2019	Mar. 2020
Ali Jeyte Osman		Mar. 2020	incumbent

== Traditional Elder ==
Nabadoon Dacar Xirsi Nuur

== Recent history ==
Somalia's civil war started around 1990. Since 1994, the Sharia law has been increasingly applied in Hiran.

In June 1995, Mohamed Farrah Aidid declared himself president of Somalia and attempted to rule Hiran, but was ousted by local clans in late 1995.

According to a 1998 report, Hiran is considered a relatively stable region within Somalia. However, banditry has flourished in the past. The governor lives in Beledweyne, and the use of militias has reduced the incidence of fighting, with the exception of Mataban District.

In June 1999, flooding in south-central Somalia caused extensive damage in Hiran.

In November 2001, the Quran School was attacked by an armed group, killing 18 students.

In August 2006, the Xawaadle and Murusade clans, who had been fighting in the Maxaas of Hiran, reconciled. However, the agreement was violated and the conflict resumed, so a peace conference was held again in October 2007.

In November 2007, militants attacked government forces near Beledweyne in Hiran. In January 2008, militants attacked an Ethiopian military base near Beledweyne.

In September 2010, the establishment of a local government called Dooxada Shabeelle was proclaimed in Kalabayr, Hiran, led by C/fataax Xasan Afrax.

In March 2011, a bombing by Al-Shabaab occurred in Beledweyne.

In December 2011, Ethiopian troops and Ahlu Sunna Waljama'a completely retook the city of Baladweyne from al-Shabaab.

In May 2013, Governor Hiran decided to send deserter soldiers from al-Shabaab who are hiding, and asked the local population for help in sending them to rehabilitation facilities.

In November 2013, a disease outbreak killed 40 people in Ceel-Cali, Hiran.

In March 2014, Hiran's executive government asked foreign charities for help, saying that healthcare was in crisis after the withdrawal of a Swiss hospital last year.

In October 2014, the AMISOM base in Hiran was attacked.

In May 2015, at a meeting in Beledweyne, a proposal was made to divide Hiran into two regions.

In December 2015, the Somali government replaced Governor Hiran for his involvement in the murders in Beledweyne. In the same month, the Somali President visits Beledweyne.

In January 2016, three people were killed in a clan war in Hiran.

In August 2016, Somalia's interior minister rejected a local request to divide Hiran into two regions.

In October 2016, Somali government and Ethiopian troops withdrew from the Halgan District of Hiran and were replaced by al-Shabaab. The withdrawal of Ethiopian troops is reportedly related to a state of emergency declaration issued in response to anti-government protests in Ethiopia.

In December 2016, Governor Hiran destroyed more than 50 charcoal burning facilities in Mataban District to prevent illegal logging and arrested more than 20 people.

In November 2017, the Hiran government declared a halt to the use of Somali shillings because villages controlled by al-Shabaab refused to accept high denomination 1,000 Somali shilling bills and because of the influx of counterfeit bills from Puntland, which caused massive inflation. United States dollars were to be used for transactions.

In October 2019, Beledweyne was severely damaged by the flooding of the Jubba and Shebelle Rivers. In November 2019, the African Union Commission assisted flooded Beledweyne with $87,000 worth of relief supplies.

In March 2020, President Mohamed Abdi Ware of Hirshabelle State dismisses Hiran Governor Ali Mohamed Arale and reappoints his predecessor Ali Jeyte Osman, but Arale refuses.

In June 2022, a clan attacked the al-Shabaab base in Booco.
