= List of terrorist incidents in 2025 =

The incidents listed here have been described by a consensus of reliable sources as "terrorism", including attacks by violent non-state actors for political motives. Terrorism related to drug wars and cartel violence is not included. Ongoing military conflicts are listed separately.

== Included incidents and casualty figures ==
- Incidents must be notable (have a stand-alone article) and described by a consensus of reliable sources as "terrorism".
- List entries must comply with the guidelines outlined in the manual of style under .
- Casualties given are the victims, with perpetrator casualties listed as a separate figure: x (+y) indicates that x victims and y perpetrators were killed/injured).
- Casualty totals may be underestimated or unavailable due to a lack of information. A figure followed by a plus (+) sign indicates that at least that many people have died or been injured (e.g. 10+ indicates that at least 10 people have died) – the actual toll could be considerably higher.
- Multiple attacks occurring in the same place on the same day are shown as a single incident.
- Casualty figures are the total casualties of the incident, including immediate and later casualties, such as people who succumbed to their wounds long after the attacks occurred.
- Casualty figures of 20 or more are shown in **bold**. Figures for casualties greater than 50 are also **underlined**.

0 people were killed/injured by the incident.
1–19 people were killed/injured by the incident.
20–49 people were killed/injured by the incident.
50–99 people were killed/injured by the incident.
100+ people were killed/injured by the incident.

== List ==
Total incidents: 85

Date	Type	Dead	Injured	Location	Article	Details	Perpetrator(s)	Part of
1 January	Vehicle-ramming attack, shootout	14 (+1)	57	New Orleans, Louisiana, United States	2025 New Orleans truck attack	A 42-year-old man, inspired by the Islamic State, drove a rented 2023 Ford F-150 Lightning into pedestrians celebrating New Year's Day, killing 14 people and injuring 57 others before being killed by police in a shootout.	Shamsud-Din Jabbar	Terrorism in the United States
1 January	Car bombing	0 (+1)	7	Paradise, Nevada, United States	2025 Las Vegas Cybertruck explosion	A 37-year-old man parked a rented Tesla Cybertruck loaded with fireworks outside the main entrance of the Trump International Hotel Las Vegas before shooting himself in the head and detonating them, killing himself and injuring seven others.	Matthew Livelsberger	Terrorism in the United States
6 January	Mass shooting	3	8	Al-Funduq, Israeli-occupied West Bank, Palestine	Al-Funduq shooting	Terrorists opened fire on a car and a bus on Highway 55 before escaping, killing three Israelis, including a police officer, and injuring eight others. Hamas's Al-Qassam Brigades claimed responsibility for the attack two days later.	Hamas	Gaza war
6 January	Roadside bombing	9	0	Bijapur district, Chhattisgarh, India	2025 Bijapur Naxal attack	An improvised explosive device detonated while a District Reserve Guard vehicle was going by, killing the driver and all eight security personnel inside.	Communist Party of India (Maoist)	Naxalite–Maoist insurgency
8 January	Mass shooting, car bombing	2 (+18)	5 (+6)	N'Djamena, Chad	2025 N'Djamena attack	24 armed men attacked the vicinity of the presidential palace, killing two security personnel and injuring five others. Eighteen attackers were also killed and six others were injured.	Boko Haram (alleged)	Boko Haram insurgency
8 January	Mass shooting, shootout, bombings	28-30	?	Alibori Department, Benin	2025 Point Triple attack	Armed gunmen attacked the Point Triple zone near the shared border with Benin, Niger and Burkina Faso, killing at least 28-30 soldiers.	Jama'at Nasr al-Islam wal-Muslimin	Insurgency in the Maghreb
11 January	Abduction/ Kidnapping	0	0	Niger and Mali	Abductions of Eva Gretzmacher and Claudia Abbt	Eva Gretzmacher, an Austrian development worker for the AMANAY Association, was abducted by armed men. On 13 April, Swiss community worker Claudia Abbt was also abducted by armed men. Both women were abducted at their homes in the city of Agadez by the Islamic State – Sahel Province.	Islamic State – Sahel Province	Islamist insurgency in the Sahel
18 January	Mass shooting, stabbing	2 (+1)	1	Tehran, Iran	Supreme Court of Iran shooting	A man armed with a handgun entered the Supreme Court of Iran and opened fire, killing judges Ali Razini and Mohammad Moghisseh and injuring another judge and a bodyguard before killing himself.	Farshad Asadi	Assassination and terrorism in Iran
4 February	Mass shooting, shootout	2 (+1)	8	Tayasir, Tubas Governorate, Palestine	Tayasir shooting	Muhammad Daraghma, the brother of Ahmed Daraghma, the founder and commander of the Tubas Brigade of the Palestinian Islamic Jihad, ambushed a military base armed with an M16 rifle, killing two soldiers and injuring eight others before being killed in a shootout.	Palestinian Islamic Jihad	Israeli–Palestinian conflict
7 February	Mass shooting	54 (+19)	34	Kobé, Gao Region, Mali	Kobé attack	Jihadists opened fire on a convoy of vehicles carrying mostly foreigners, killing at least 54 people, including 20 Malian soldiers, and injuring 34 others. 19 attackers were also killed.	Islamic State – Sahel Province	Mali War
9 February	Clash, explosions, mass shooting	2 (+31)	2	Indravati National Park, Bijapur district, Chhattisgarh, India	2025 Bijapur clash	A clash occurred at the Indravati National Park between Maoists and police with explosive devices, grenade launchers and AK-47s, killing two security forces and injuring two others. At least 31 Maoists were also killed during the clash.	Communist Party of India (Maoist)	Naxalite-Maoist insurgency
15 February	Mass stabbing	1	5	Villach, Austria	2025 Villach stabbing attack	A 23-year-old man linked to the Islamic State stabbed six pedestrians walking by him before being arrested by responding officers, killing a fourteen-year-old boy and injuring five others, including two seriously.	Islamic State	Terrorism in Austria, Islamic terrorism in Europe
20 February	Bombing	0	0	Bat Yam, Tel Aviv District, Israel	2025 Bat Yam bus bombings	Three bombs were detonated, probably earlier than when they were supposed to, in parked buses in the city of Bat Yam. Two other devices failed to explode.	Hamas (suspected)	Gaza war, Terrorism in Israel
21 February	Stabbing	0	1	Berlin, Germany	Berlin Holocaust memorial stabbing	A 19-year-old Syrian asylum seeker stabbed a 30-year-old Spanish tourist at the Memorial to the Murdered Jews of Europe, critically injuring him. The perpetrator planned the attack weeks before and expressed desire to kill Jewish people.	Wassim al M.	Antisemitism in Europe
22 February	Mass stabbing	1	7	Mulhouse, France	2025 Mulhouse stabbing attack	A 37-year-old Algerian man yelled "Allahu Akbar" several times before attacking multiple people at a protest, including police officers.	Brahim Abdessemed	Terrorism in France, Islamic terrorism in Europe
27 February	Explosions, gunfire	16	70+	Bukavu, South Kivu, Democratic Republic of Congo	2025 Bukavu M23 rally bombings	At least two people threw a grenade and opened fire at a public gathering organized by the March 23 Movement, killing at least 16 people and injuring 70 others.	Unknown	2025 Bukavu offensive, M23 campaign
27 February	Vehicle-ramming attack, attempted mass stabbing	1 (+1)	13	Karkur Junction, Highway 65, Pardes Hanna-Karkur, Israel	2025 Karkur junction ramming attack	A 53-year-old Palestinian man drove his car into a group of people at a bus stop, killing one person and injuring thirteen others, before being killed by police after he exited the vehicle and tried to stab officers with a screwdriver. Hamas praised the attack but did not claim responsibility for it.	Jamil Ziyud	Israeli–Palestinian conflict
28 February	Bombing	7 (+1)	20	Nowshera, Khyber Pakhtunkhwa, Pakistan	2025 Darul Uloom Haqqania bombing	A suicide bombing occurred at the Darul Uloom Haqqania. The attack took place during Friday prayers, resulting in the deaths eight individuals, including the perpetrator and the prominent cleric and head of the seminary, Hamid Ul Haq Haqqani.	Islamic State – Khorasan Province (Suspected)	Insurgency in Khyber Pakhtunkhwa
11 March	Mass shooting, bombings, hostage taking, derailment	26 (+33)	38	Sibi District, Balochistan, Pakistan	2025 Jaffar Express hijacking	BLA militants derailed the Jaffar Express train with explosives before opening fire and taking hostages, killing 8 passengers and 23 security personnel. 38 people, including at least 3 security personnel and the train driver, were injured during the attack. All 33 attackers were killed according to security officials. Mama Qadeer reported that all of the more than 200 security personnel were killed in the attack while the BLA claimed they killed 50 security personnel and 50 hostages.	Balochistan Liberation Army	Insurgency in Balochistan
11 March	Car bombing, mass shooting, siege	15 (+6)	5+	Beledweyne, Hiiraan, Somalia	2025 Beledweyne hotel attack	Six Al-Shabaab militants detonated explosives and opened fire after storming the Cairo Hotel, killing fifteen people, including clan elders and security guards, and injuring at least five others. Six militants were also killed in the attack.	Al-Shabaab	Somali Civil War, 2025 Shabelle offensive
18 March	Bombing	10	20	Hamar Jajab District, Mogadishu, Somalia	Attempted assassination of Hassan Sheikh Mohamud	A roadside bomb hidden beneath a building exploded near president Hassan Sheikh Mohamud's convoy near the Villa Somalia while he was travelling to Aden Adde International Airport, killing ten people and injuring twenty others.	Al-Shabaab	Somali Civil War
21 March	Assault, arson, massacre	44	13	Fambita, Kokorou, Tillabéri Region, Niger	Fambita mosque attack	At least 44 people were killed and 13 others were injured when Islamic State militants carried out an armed assault and set ablaze a mosque in Fambita.	Islamic State – Sahel Province	Jihadist insurgency in Niger
23 March	Assault, shooting, stabbing, ransacking, overrun	6 (+2)	5 (+4)	Fafi Constituency, Garissa, Kenya	2025 Garissa attack	At least six police officers were killed and five others were injured in an armed assault on a police reservists camp in Garissa. At least two militants were also killed and at least four were injured, weapons were stolen and others were kidnapped.	Al-Shabaab	Somali Civil War
24 March	Vehicle-ramming attack, shooting, stabbing	1 (+1)	2	Yokneam Illit, Northern District, Israel	Tishbi Junction attack	An Israeli-Arab ran over and stabbed a soldier at the Tishbi Junction before taking his weapon and shooting at a passing car, killing the elderly passenger and lightly injuring the driver. The attacker was fatally shot by security forces at the scene.	Karem Jabarin	Israeli–Palestinian conflict
27 March	Mass stabbing	0	5 (+1)	Amsterdam, The Netherlands	2025 Amsterdam stabbing attack	Five different nationality people were stabbed and injured in a knife attack in the Sint Nicolaasstraat area in central Amsterdam, Netherlands. The perpetrator was arrested by Dutch police with terrorism being suspected.	Roman D.	Terrorism in Europe
28 March	Looting, arson, mass shooting	60+	?	Diapaga, Est Region, Burkina Faso	2025 Diapaga attack	Jihadists from Jama'at Nasr al-Islam wal-Muslimin attacked Burkinabe forces at Diapaga, Est Region, Burkina Faso, killing at least sixty soldiers. The attack was revenge for the massacre of over 58 civilians at Solenzo on March 11.	Jama'at Nasr al-Islam wal-Muslimin	Islamist insurgency in Burkina Faso
1 April	Mass stabbing	0	3	Duhok, Kurdistan Region, Iraq	2025 Duhok axe attack	A Syrian national suspected to be linked to ISIS attacked three Assyrians at the Kha b-Nisan festival in Duhok, Kurdistan Region, Iraq.	Islamic State	Anti-Assyrian sentiment, Islamic State insurgency in Iraq
13 April	Arson	0	0	Pennsylvania Governor's Residence, Harrisburg, Pennsylvania, United States	2025 Pennsylvania Governor's Residence arson	A 38-year-old set governor Josh Shapiro's residence on fire with Molotov cocktails while he and his family slept inside. The perpetrator was charged with terrorism, attempted murder, aggravated arson, and aggravated assault after he turned himself into the police.	Cody Balmer	Terrorism in the United States
13 April - Present	Arson, shooting	0	0	France	2025 French prison attacks	The 2025 French prison attacks are a series of terrorist attacks that started on 13 April 2025, and spanned several days, targeting multiple prisons and penitentiary-related places and targets across France with arson attacks on vehicles and automatic weapon fire.	Unknown	Terrorism in Europe
15 April	Bombing	3	20	Pakistan	2025 Mastung bus bombing	The 2025 Mastung bombing was a terrorist attack that occurred on 15 April 2025 in the Mastung District of Balochistan, Pakistan. A bus carrying personnel from the Pakistani security forces was targeted with an improvised explosive device.	Islamic State – Khorsan Province (ISKP)	Terrorism in Pakistan, and Bolichistan Insurgency
17 April	Car bombing	2	31	La Plata, Huila Department, Colombia	Attack at the La Plata police station	A motorcycle carrying explosives exploded in front of a police station, killing two siblings and injuring at least 31 others, including several minors.	FARC dissidents	Colombian conflict
22 April	Mass shooting, massacre	26	20	Pahalgam, Anantnag district, Jammu and Kashmir, India	2025 Pahalgam attack	At least 26 people, including law enforcement members and mostly tourists, were killed and at least 20 others were injured when a group of militants opened fire on people eating and taking pony rides at a meadow.	The Resistance Front	Insurgency in Jammu and Kashmir
April 25-28	Clashes	0 (+71)	0	Hassan Khel, North Waziristan, Khyber Pakhtunkhwa, Pakistan	2025 North Waziristan border clashes	Between 25 and 28 April 2025, Pakistani Armed Forces engaged a large group of militants attempting infiltration along the Pakistan-Afghanistan border. In two days of clashes, 54 militants were killed, followed by a sanitization operation that eliminated 17 more, raising the total to 71. Weapons, ammunition, and explosives were recovered.	Tehrik-i-Taliban Pakistan	Insurgency in Khyber Pakhtunkhwa
May 5	Mass shooting	3 (+2)	7 (+1)	Makhachkala, Dagestan, Russia	2025 Makhachkala clash	A group of militants opened fire on police officers during a routine traffic stop, killing three officers and injuring seven others. Police returned fire on the militants, killing two and injuring one, while others managed to escape.	Unknown militants	Terrorism in Russia
May 14	Shooting	2	1	Brukhin, West Bank	Route 446 shooting	A man ambushed and shot at a vehicle, killing a pregnant woman and her baby, as well as injuring another person. The shooter fled the scene.	Nael Samara	Israeli–Palestinian conflict
May 17	Car bombing	0 (+1)	4	Palm Springs, California, United States	2025 Palm Springs fertility clinic bombing	A car bomb detonated at the entrance of a fertility clinic in Palm Springs, California, killing one person and injuring four others.	Guy Edward Bartkus (suspect)	Terrorism in the United States
May 18	Suicide bombing	20 (+1)	15	Hodan District, Mogadishu, Somalia	2025 Mogadishu military base bombing	An Al-Shabaab suicide bomber killed at least 20 people, 15 recruits and five civilians nearby, outside the gates of Damaanyo military base where hundreds of young men had been lined up to enlist in the Somali National Army in Hodan neighbourhood of Mogadishu. Another 15 others were seriously injured in the bombing, including some critically, and the death toll is expected to rise due to the severity of the injuries.	Al-Shabaab	Somali Civil War (2009–present)
May 18	Mass stabbing	0	5 (+1)	Bielefeld, North Rhine-Westphalia, Germany	2025 Bielefeld stabbing attack	A Syrian Islamist stabbed five people watching an association football match at a bar. Some guests tried to subdue the attacker, injuring him. The perpetrator fled on a train before later being arrested in a neighboring district. He resisted and sustained more injuries. He said he was a sympathized the Islamic State.	Mahmoud M.	Islamic terrorism in Europe
May 19	Drone strike	4	5	Hurmuz village, Mir Ali tehsil, North Waziristan, Pakistan	2025 Waziristan drone strike	A quadcopter drone dropped munitions on a civilian house in Hurmuz village, Mir Ali tehsil. The attack killed four children from the same family and injured five others, including a woman. Some of the injured were in critical condition and were taken to Mir Ali Hospital for treatment.	Tehreek-i-Taliban-e-Pakistan (TTP)	Insurgency in Khyber Pakhtunkhwa and Terrorism in Pakistan
May 21	Mass shooting	2	0	Washington, D.C., United States	2025 Capital Jewish Museum shooting	A gunman opened fire outside the Lillian & Albert Small Capital Jewish Museum, Washington DC, killing two staff members of the Israeli Embassy. The attacker was later apprehended.	Elias Rodriguez	Terrorism in the United States
May 21	Suicide bombing, improvised explosive device attack, vehicle-ramming attack	10 (+1)	53	Khuzdar, Balochistan, Pakistan	2025 Khuzdar school bus bombing	A suicide bomber drove an explosive-laden vehicle into a school bus transporting students of the Army Public School. The attack took place around 7:40 a.m. local time (2:40 GMT) and resulted in the deaths of eleven people, eight children, the bus driver, a security guard and the bomber. A total of 53 others were injured in the blast.	Balochistan Liberation Army (alleged)	Insurgency in Balochistan and Terrorism in Pakistan
May 22	Clash	1 (+27)	1	Abujhmarh, Chhattisgarh, India	2025 Abujhmarh clash	A clash occurred between Maoists and security forces in the Abujmarh forest area. 27 Maoists were killed, including a top leader, while one soldier was killed and another was injured.	Communist Party of India (Maoist)	Naxalite–Maoist insurgency
May 22 and May 28	Bombings	2	6	Al-Safa, Suwayda Governorate, Syria	2025 Southern Syria bombings	May 22: ISIS detonated a car bomb targeted a vehicle belonging to Syrian government forces in the Tulul al-Safa region of Suwayda Governorate—a remote desert area in southern Syria. The group claimed the bombing killed or wounded seven soldiers, however, the Britain-based Syrian Observatory for Human Rights said that the attack on government forces had only killed one civilian and wounded three soldiers. May 28: On May 28, 2025, ISIS carried out a bombing in the Tulul al-Safa region of Suwayda Governorate, targeting fighters from the U.S.-backed Syrian Free Army. The group used an improvised explosive device (IED) to strike an FSA vehicle, claiming to have killed one fighter and wounded three others.	Islamic State	Syrian Civil War
May 31 and June 1	Explosions, train derailments, bridge collapses	8	122	Bryansk Oblast and Kursk Oblast, Russia	2025 Russia bridge collapses	On May 31, a passenger train with hundreds of occupants was derailed by an explosion the bridge it was travelling on in Bryansk Oblast, causing a section to fall onto the train, killing seven people and injuring eighty-nine others. A day later, a track-measuring train with two cars reportedly derailed after three explosions on a bridge, the Unecha-Zhecha section, in Bryansk Oblast while it was going there. No casualties or damage were reported. Another train derailed and caught fire after an explosion on a bridge in Kursk Oblast, initially injuring three people, including the train's driver. One of the injured workers later succumbed to their injuries in hospital. The collapses are being probed as acts of terrorism.	Special forces of Ukraine	Terrorism in Russia
June 1	Firebombing	1	14 (+1)	Boulder, Colorado, United States	2025 Boulder fire attack	Mohamed Sabry Soliman, a male Egyptian living in Colorado, allegedly used a makeshift flamethrower and Molotov cocktails to attack a group participating in a solidarity walk for hostages taken from Israel during the October 7 attacks, leaving fifteen people injured, including the suspect. One other person was reported to be injured, but ended up dying from their injuries weeks later.	Mohamed Sabry Soliman	Violent incidents in reaction to the Gaza war
June 2	Car bombing, artillery attack	30-60+ (+6-14)	Unknown	Timbuktu, Mali	2025 Timbuktu attack	Jihadist militants attacked Timbuktu Airport and multiple military checkpoints around the city. The Malian Armed Forces reported to have repelled the attackers.	Jama'at Nusrat al-Islam wal-Muslimin	Mali War
June 4	Shooting, abduction	2	?	Ifelodun, Kwara State, Nigeria	2025 Oreke-Okeigbo attack	Unidentified gunmen attacked a marble stone mining site, killing two police officers and kidnapping two others.	Suspected bandits	Nigerian bandit conflict
June 19	Mass shooting, shootout, assault	71 (+≥24)	14	Banibangou, Tillabéri, Niger	2025 Banibangou attack	Over 200 gunmen on motorbikes and in eight vehicles stormed a Niger Armed Forces base and engaged in gunfire with soldiers, killing 71 soldiers and dozens of terrorists, while 14 others soldiers were injured. The Islamic State claimed responsibility for the assault in a statement released the following day.	Islamic State	Islamist insurgency in Niger
June 20	Ambush	71+)	20+	Manda, Niger	Manda massacre	Jihadist militants attacked the village while a night-time prayer was ongoing at the local mosque, massacring people who were attending it.	Islamic State – Sahel Province	Islamist insurgency in Niger
June 22	Suicide bombing, shooting	30 (+1)	54	Damascus, Syria	Mar Elias Church bombing	At least one attacker covering his face opened fire at a crowd of people inside the Mar Elias Church while 350 people were praying during mass before detonating his explosive vest after being charged at, killing at least 31 people, including himself, and injuring 54 others. Local media reported children were among the casualties. The Syrian Ministry of Interior said the Islamic State was responsible for the attack, while the Saraya Ansar al-Sunnah group claimed responsibility for the attack.	Saraya Ansar al-Sunnah	Syrian Civil War
June 28	Suicide bombing, car bombing, vehicle-ramming attack, mass murder	16 (+1)	29	Khadi, Mir Ali, North Waziristan District, Khyber Pakhtunkhwa, Pakistan	2025 Mir Ali attack	A Pakistani Taliban suicide bomber drove an explosive-laden vehicle into a Pakistan Armed Forces convoy before detonating the explosives, killing themself along with 16 soldiers and injuring 29 others, including six children and women.	Hafiz Gul Bahadur Group (Part of TTP)	Insurgency in Khyber Pakhtunkhwa and Terrorism in Pakistan
July 1	Mass Murder	15-17	Several	Kwallajiya, Sokoto State, Nigeria	2025 Kwallajiya attack	On 1 July 2025, militants believed to be members of the Lakurawa group launched a raid on Kwallajiya, a village in the Tangaza Local Government Area of Sokoto State, Nigeria. Many were preparing for afternoon prayers, with many victims working on their farms.	Lakurawa (faction of ISSP)	Nigerian Bandit Conflict and Terrorism in Nigeria
July 2	IED bombing	5	11	Nawagai Road, Khar Tehsil, Bajaur District, Khyber Pakhtunkhwa, Pakistan	2025 Bajaur bombing	An IED exploded under a government vehicle carrying senior administrative officers, resulting in multiple fatalities and injuries.	Islamic State	Insurgency in Khyber Pakhtunkhwa and Terrorism in Pakistan
July 9	Suicide bombing, gunfire	≥4 (+1)	Several	Jaalle Siyaad military academy, Mogadishu, Somalia	2025 Jaalle Siyaad military academy bombing	A suicide bomber blew themself up at a military academy followed by gunfire, reportedly killing at least four soldiers and injuring several others. Exact casualty figures are unknown, but officials said they will release confirmed casualty figures once the probe is complete.	Al-Shabaab	Somali Civil War (2009–present)
July 9	Animal-borne bombing, shooting	1	2	Valdivia, Antioquia Department, Colombia	Valdivia donkey bomb attack	An explosive device attached to a donkey detonated near Colombian National Army troops, killing it as well as a lieutenant. Two other soldiers were injured in the explosion. After the explosion, gunmen opened fire.	National Liberation Army	Colombian conflict
July 10	Shooting, stabbing	1 (+2)	0	Gush Etzion Junction, West Bank	July 2025 Gush Etzion Junction attack	Two Palestinian gunmen shot and killed a guard in the parking lot of the Harim Mall before being killed by security forces.	Mahmoud Yousef Abed and Malek Ibrahim Salem	Israeli–Palestinian conflict
July 27	Mass stabbing	0	11	Traverse City, Michigan, United States	2025 Traverse City stabbing attack	A 42-year-old man stabbed people inside a Walmart, injuring 11 people, before being arrested.	Bradford James Gille	Terrorism in the United States
July 27	Mass shooting, mass stabbing, arson, kidnapping	43-50	13	Komanda, Ituri Province, Democratic Republic of the Congo	Komanda massacre	Militants attacked a catholic church during a night vigil when around 100 people were present. Churchgoers were rounded up and executed with light firearms and machetes before rebels burned stores and houses. People were reported missing and several children were kidnapped.	Allied Democratic Forces	Allied Democratic Forces insurgency
July 28	Shooting	1	0	Umm al-Khair, Hebron, West Bank, Palestine	Killing of Awdah Hathaleen	Palestinian activist and consultant on the 2024 documentary No Other Land, Awdah Hathaleen, was shot and killed by an Israeli settler.	Yinon Levi	Israeli settler violence
August 19	Mass shooting, kidnapping	50	7+	Malumfashi, Katsina State, Nigeria	2025 Katsina mosque attack	Armed bandits attacked a mosque, killing 50 people and injuring multiple others. More than 60 people were also reportedly kidnapped.	Bandits	Nigerian bandit conflict
August 22	Stabbing	1	0	Charlotte, North Carolina, United States	Killing of Iryna Zarutska	A 23-year-old Ukrainian refugee was fatally stabbed multiple times on a Lynx Blue Line train by a schizophrenic man. He fled the scene before being arrested on a platform. He was charged with federal terrorism.	Decarlos Brown Jr.	Terrorism in the United States
August 24	Stabbing	1	0	Kampen, Oslo, Norway	Killing of Tamima Nibras Juhar	Tamima Nibras Juhar, a 34-year-old Muslim welfare worker, was fatally stabbed at work by an 18-year-old man. The suspect was later arrested and expressed far-right views. The suspect also had plans to attack mosques.	Djordje Wilms	Terrorism in Norway
August 26	Shooting, ambush	2	1	Porepunkah, Victoria, Australia	Porepunkah police shootings	A self-proclaimed sovereign citizen opened fire on police officers executing a warrant as part of a firearms prohibition order in relation to historical sex offences against the perpetrator, killing two and injuring one. The perpetrator fled the scene and was shot dead on the 30th of march 2026, 216 days after the shooting.	Dezi Freeman	Terrorism in Australia
August 27	Mass shooting	2 (+1)	30	Minneapolis, Minnesota, United States	Annunciation Catholic Church shooting	A 23-year-old, who may have identified as a transgender woman, shot up a Catholic church and school, killing two children injuring 21 others during a Catholic mass. Federal Bureau of Investigation director Kash Patel said the shooting is being investigated as a domestic terrorist attack and an anti-Catholic hate crime.	Robin Westman	Domestic terrorism in the United States
September 8	Mass shooting	6 (+2)	21	Ramot Junction, Jerusalem, Southern Levant	2025 Ramot Junction shooting	Six people were killed and 21 others were injured when two gunmen opened fire on a bus before being fatally shot by an Israel Defense Forces officer and an armed civilian.	Hamas	Israeli–Palestinian conflict
September 8	Mass shooting, shootout	3	4 (+1)	Balçova, İzmir, Turkey	2025 Balçova police station shooting	A 16-year-old opened fire at a police station, killing three police officers and injuring three others as well as a civilian, before being shot in the leg and subdued. A Twitter account allegedly belonging to the attacker contained a post stating "I will perform a suicide attack soon and become a martyr, Allah willing," along with posts related to the Islamic State, according to reports.	Islamic State (suspected)	Turkey–Islamic State conflict
September 8	Mass shooting, assault	60-71+	Unknown	Ntoyo, Democratic Republic of the Congo	Ntoyo massacre	Jihadist militants attacked a christian funeral wake in Ntoyo using firearms and machetes.	Allied Democratic Forces	Kivu conflict
September 18	Shooting	2 (+1)	0	Allenby Bridge	2025 Allenby Bridge shooting	A Jordanian truck driver delivering humanitarian aid to the Gaza Strip fatally shot two Israeli soldiers at the Allenby Bridge border crossing between Jordan and Israel before being killed.	Abdul Muttalib Al-Qaisi	Middle Eastern crisis
September 28	Mass shooting, arson	4 (+1)	8	The Church of Jesus Christ of Latter-day Saints, Grand Blanc Township, Michigan, United States.	Grand Blanc Township church attack	A man rammed a vehicle through the front doors of a Mormon church before exiting and opening fire, killing two people and injuring five others before setting the church on fire, killing an additional two.	Thomas Jacob Sanford	Domestic terrorism in the United States
September 30	Car bombing, shooting	10-13 (+4-6)	~32	Quetta, Balochistan, Pakistan	September 2025 Quetta bombing	At least 10-13 people were killed and around 32 others were injured in a suicide car bombing followed by gunfire outside the Frontier Corps headquarters. Four-six attackers were killed by security personnel.	Unknown	Insurgency in Balochistan
October 2	Stabbing, vehicle-ramming attack	2 (+1)	3	Heaton Park Hebrew Congregation, Manchester, United Kingdom	2025 Manchester synagogue attack	A man drove his car into people outside a synagogue before using a knife. Two people were killed three were injured. The attacker, who claimed to have bombs, was fatally shot by police. The Greater Manchester Police are investigating the attack as a terrorist attack.	Jihad al-Shamie	Antisemitism in the United Kingdom
October 4	Gunfire, explosions, car bombing	0 (+7)	~25	Mogadishu, Somalia	2025 Mogadishu prison attack	Militants attacked a high-security prison in an hours-long siege that resulted in no fatalities and about 25 injuries. All seven attackers were also killed.	Al-Shabaab	Somali Civil War
November 7	Grenade attack	0	96 (+1)	Kelapa Gading, Jakarta, Indonesia	Jakarta school bombing	An attacker hurled explosive devices at worshippers in a mosque during friday prayers, injuring at least 97 people, including himself. The attack is being investigated as possible terrorism as the attacker had names of far-right attackers and other phrases written on an airsoft gun.	Muhammad Nazriel Fadhel Hidayat	Terrorism in Indonesia
November 10	Car bombing	14 (+1)	20	New Delhi, India	2025 Delhi car explosion	A car bomb exploded near the Red Fort in New Delhi, India, killing at least 15 people and injuring more than 20 others.	Umar Mohammed	Terrorism in India
November 10	Vehicle-ramming attack, shootout, suicide bombing	0 (+5)	9	Wana, South Waziristan District, Khyber Pakhtunkhwa, Pakistan	Cadet College Wana attack	Afghan terrorists stormed a cadet college in a day long siege. Roofs of several houses collapsed, injuring nine people. All attackers were killed, including a suicide bomber that completely destroyed the entrance of the main gate, and no fatalities among cadets were reported.	Pakistani Taliban	Insurgency in Khyber Pakhtunkhwa
November 11	Suicide car bombing	12 (+1)	36+	Islamabad, Pakistan	2025 Islamabad suicide bombing	A suicide car bomber detonated outside of the district judicial complex in Islamabad, Pakistan, after he attempted to enter the building. It was the deadliest attack in Islamabad in nearly a decade.	Jamaat-ul-Ahrar	Terrorism in Pakistan
November 17	Arson, non-fatal immolation	0	1 (+1)	Chicago, Illinois, United States	2025 Chicago train attack	A man set a woman on fire on a Blue Line train at the Clark/Lake station, critically injuring her and injuring himself in the process. The man fled the scene and was arrested a day later. He was charged with federal terrorism.	Lawrence Reed	Terrorism in the United States
November 18	Mass stabbing, attempted vehicle-ramming attack	1 (+2)	3	Gush Etzion Junction, West Bank	2025 Gush Etzion Junction attack	Two Palestinians attempted to ram a vehicle into civilians at a hitchhiking post before getting out and stabbing people in the area, killing one and injuring two. An Israel Defense Forces soldier opened fire on the attackers, killing them, as well as injuring a civilian.	Palestinian Islamic Jihad	Israeli–Palestinian conflict
November 21	Kidnapping	0	0	Niger State, Nigeria	2025 Niger State school kidnapping	Gunmen abducted 303 students and 12 staff from a Catholic school at night before fleeing. Subsequently, 50 students escaped and returned to their families. No group has claimed responsibility for the attack yet.	Unknown	Kidnapping and religious violence in Nigeria
November 24	Suicide bombing, mass shooting, shootout	3 (+3)	11	Peshawar, Khyber Pakhtunkhwa, Pakistan	2025 Federal Constabulary headquarters attack	A suicide bomber and two gunmen attacked a Federal Constabulary headquarters, killing at least three and injuring 11, before the gunmen were fatally shot in a shootout.	Jamaat-ul-Ahrar	Insurgency in Khyber Pakhtunkhwa
December 13	Mass shooting, ambush	3 (+1)	5	Palmyra, Syria	2025 Palmyra ambush	An Islamic State linked gunman attacked US troops stationed in Palmyra. He was later killed in the shootout.	Terrorism in Syria	
December 14	Mass shooting	15 (+1)	42 (+1)	Bondi Beach, Sydney, Australia	2025 Bondi Beach shooting	Two Islamic State-linked gunmen opened fire on a popular beach during a Hanukkah celebration, killing 15 people and injuring dozens more. One attacker was killed at the scene, while the other was taken into custody in critical condition. Police later discovered and safely removed two suspected improvised explosive devices from a car near the scene linked to one of the shooters.	Naveed Akram, Sajid Akram	Terrorism in Australia
December 26	Vehicle-ramming attack, mass stabbing	2	2 (+1)	Harod Valley, Northern District, Israel	2025 Harod Valley attack	A Palestinian ran over and stabbed civilians on a bike lane, killing one person and injuring another. The attacker fled towards Ein Harod and rammed a car, injuring a woman, before getting out and fatally stabbing her. He fled again but was later shot and injured by an armed civilian.	Unidentified Palestinian	Israeli–Palestinian conflict
December 26	Bombing	8	18	Homs, Syria	Ali ibn Abi Talib Mosque bombing	A bomb exploded near an interior wall of a mosque during Friday prayers, killing eight people and injuring 18 others.	Saraya Ansar al-Sunnah	Syrian conflict
