= 2025 in Somalia =

- Decades: 2000s; 2010s; 2020s
- See also: History of Somalia; List of years in Somalia

Events in the year 2025 in Somalia.

== Incumbents ==
- President: Hassan Sheikh Mohamud.
- Prime Minister: Hamza Abdi Barre.
- Speaker of the House: Abdi Hashim Abdelahi.

== Events ==
=== Ongoing ===
- Somali Civil War (timeline)
- Constitutional crisis in Somalia
- Controversies of Hassan Sheikh Mohamud
- Jubaland crisis

=== January ===
- 1 January — African Union Support and Stabilization Mission in Somalia – The UN Security Council authorizes a new Somalia peacekeeping mission to replace a larger African Union Transition Mission in Somalia.
- 13 January – China announces the rescue of a Chinese fishing vessel carrying 18 crew members that was hijacked in December off the coast of Hafun District, Puntland.

=== February ===
- 1 February — The United States carries out airstrikes against a senior Islamic State figure and other members at the Golis Mountains in Puntland, killing several militants.
- 10 February — A Yemeni fishing vessel is hijacked by suspected pirates off the coast of Eyl. The ship and its 12 crew are rescued on 13 February with the help of EUNAVFOR Atalanta.
- 11 February — Islamic State militants attack a military base in Togga Jacel, Puntland, leaving 27 Puntland soldiers and more than 70 militants dead.
- 17 February — A second Yemeni fishing vessel is hijacked by suspected pirates off the coast of Eyl. The vessel is abandoned by the hijackers on 22 February, leaving its crew unharmed.
- 20 February — Al-Shabaab militants attack multiple villages in Middle Shabelle. The military says it and allied militias had killed more than 130 of the attackers.
- 25 February – The federal government and the African Union finalize the troop distribution for the new peacekeeping mission AUSSOM, resolving prior disputes with Ethiopia and later Burundi.
- 27 February:
  - Mogadishu enters a security lockdown after several mortars were fired toward Aden Adde International Airport during a visit from Ethiopian Prime Minister Abiy Ahmed.
  - Somali forces regain control of Balad after Al-Shabaab launches a coordinated attack, detonating roadside bombs and briefly seizing the town.
  - Villa Somalia security guards open fire on civilians at Lido Beach in Mogadishu while attempting to clear the beach ahead of a visit from Ethiopian Prime Minister Abiy Ahmed, killing a teenage boy and wounding several others.

=== March ===
- 11 March — 2025 Beledweyne hotel attack: Al-Shabaab launches a coordinated gunmen attack and car bombing on the Qahira Hotel in Beledweyne, killing more than 15 people and injuring at least 5 others.
- 12 March – President of Puntland Said Abdullahi Deni announces the establishment of an Anti-Money Laundering Agency to combat illegal financial activities.
- 13 March – The Nugaal regional first instance court convicts a security guard and sentences him to four years in prison and a $1,500 fine for assaulting an eight-year-old Yemeni refugee child in Garowe.
- 16 March:
  - A third Yemeni fishing vessel is hijacked by suspected pirates off the coast of Eyl.
  - President Hassan Sheikh Mohamud sends a letter to US President Donald Trump offering to take over the strategic air bases in Balidogle and Berbera along with the ports of Berbera and Bosaso.
- 18 March – Attempted assassination of Hassan Sheikh Mohamud: A bomb attack is made on President Mohamud's convoy near Villa Somalia, killing more than 10 people and injuring 20 others.
- 22 March – Five crew members are killed when a de Havilland Canada DHC-5 Buffalo cargo plane experiences a technical failure and crashes in Ceel Xabaaloow near Jasiira settlement in Mogadishu while en route from Dhobley Airport to Aden Adde International Airport.

=== April ===
- 16 April — Al-Shabaab claims to have taken the town of Adan Yabaal in Middle Shabelle.
- 24 April — Al-Shabaab claims to have taken the town of Wargaadhi in Middle Shabelle.
- 30 April — Somalia imposes an entry ban on Taiwanese nationals due to Taiwan opening "unauthorized offices", prompting a reciprocal response by Taiwan on Somali nationals.

=== May ===
- 9 May — At least seven people are killed in flooding caused by heavy rains in Mogadishu.
- 18 May — At least 13 people are killed in a suicide bombing targeting recruits at the Damanyo army base in Mogadishu.
- 27 May — As part of a FIFA-sponsored "peace tour" Samuel Eto'o, Emmanuel Adebayor, and Jay-Jay Okocha play an exhibition game in Somalia to improve the country's reputation.

=== June ===
- 4 June – US President Donald Trump issues a proclamation barring Somali nationals from entering the United States.
- 22 June – At least seven Ugandan Armed Forces personnel deployed as part of the African Union Support and Stabilization Mission in Somalia are confirmed killed by Al Shabaab following a three-day siege on Sabiidd-Anole in Lower Shabelle amid ongoing operations against the militant group.
- 23 June:
  - Al-Shabaab claims that it had overrun a military installation, killed several soldiers, and seized weapons and military equipment following clashes with the Somali National Army near Baidoa.
  - The United Nations formally removes Somalia from its annual register of nations that enlist and deploy child soldiers. The country had been included on the register since 2007, owing to consistent reports of child recruitment by Somali Armed Forces and associated militias.

=== July ===
- 2 July – A Ugandan Air Force helicopter being used by the African Union Support and Stabilization Mission in Somalia crashes during landing at Aden Adde International Airport in Mogadishu, killing five of the eight people on board.
- 7 July – At least 40 Somali National Army and Ma'awisley fighters are killed after al-Shabaab militants recapture Moqokori in Hiran region.
- 9 July – A suspected suicide bombing claimed by Al-Shabaab occurs at the Jaalle Siyaad Military Academy in Hodan District, Mogadishu.
- 13 July – al-Shabaab seizes the town of Tardo in Hiran region.
- 27 July – al-Shabaab seizes the town of Mahas in Hiran region.

=== August ===
- 1–8 August – U.S. forces conduct a series of five airstrikes against al-Shabab near Bariire, supporting Somali and African Union ground operations to recapture the town from the militants.
- 14 August – Ten cheetah cubs held by poachers to be traded illegally overseas are rescued in Salahlay District, Somaliland.
- 19 August – Former presidents Abdiqasim Salad Hassan, Sharif Sheikh Ahmed and Mohamed Abdullahi Mohamed issue a joint statement denouncing the administration of Hassan Sheikh Mohamud for its management of public land in Mogadishu, accusing it of violating constitutional safeguards and forcibly displacing impoverished families.

=== September ===
- 15 September – The federal government launches its first National Counter-IED Strategy.
- 16 September – Four TikTokers are arrested for insulting President Hassan Sheikh Mohamud in a dance video that altered lyrics of his 2022 campaign song.

=== October ===
- 4 October – Seven Al-Shabaab militants are killed during an attack on Godka Jilicow prison in Mogadishu.

=== November ===
- 3 November – Armed assailants attempt to attack the Cayman Islands-flagged chemical tanker Stolt Sagaland near the coast of Mogadishu. The crew and onboard security team repel the attack; no injuries or damages are reported.
- 6 November – The Maltese-flagged tanker Hellas Aphrodite is attacked by pirates off the Somali coast. Its 24 crew are rescued by the Spanish Navy operating under Operation Atalanta the next day after the pirates are driven off.
- 16 November – The Immigration and Citizenship Agency acknowledges a cyberattack on its electronic visa platform that results in the possible exposure of data belonging to at least 35,000 people.

=== December ===
- 25 December – Direct elections for local councils are held in Mogadishu, the first time since 1969 that direct elections have been conducted in Somalia.
- 26 December – Israel becomes the first country to formally recognize Somaliland as an independent nation.

== Holidays ==
- 1 January – New Year's Day
- 27 January – Isra' and Mi'raj
- 31 March – Eid al-Fitr
- 1 May – Labour Day
- 18 May – Somaliland Declaration of Independence
- 7 – 8 June – Eid al-Adha
- 27 June – Islamic New Year
- 1 July – Independence Day
- 7 July – Ashura
- 5 September – The Prophet's Birthday

== See also ==
- 2025 in Somaliland
