= 2025 Godka Jilaow prison attack =

2025 Mogadishu prison attack
- Part of the Somali Civil War
- Location: 2°02′21.8″N 45°20′21.7″E; Godka Jilaow prison, Bondhere, Mogadishu, Somalia
- Date: 4 October 2025; 12 months ago c.4:40 p.m. – (EAT)
- Target: NISA sector
- Attack type: Suicide bombing, clashes, gunfire, shootout, siege
- Weapons: Explosives, small arms, Toyota Hilux
- Deaths: 7 (all attackers)
- Injuries: c. 25
- Perpetrator: al-Shabaab
- No. of participants: 7

On 4 October 2025, seven attackers were killed and multiple others were injured, and several prisoners escaped following an attack on a National Intelligence and Security Agency (NISA) prison by the militant group al-Shabaab in Somalia. The militants stormed the high-security Godka Jilaow underground prison in the capital, Mogadishu.

== Background ==
Godka Jilaow, a prison located near the Villa Somalia presidential palace compound, houses several al-Shabaab fighters. Somali government forces engaged in fierce fighting with the attackers.

Al-Shabaab, formed in 2004, has waged an insurgency in southern Somalia since 2007 and made significant advances in the capital, Mogadishu, in 2025.

At least 12 people were killed at the gate of the prison by a car bomb attack by al-Shabaab militants in 2014.

== Attack ==
The attack occurred at around 4:40 p.m. Explosions followed by gunfire were reported at the prison. The attackers reportedly used explosives and small arms. Somalia's state media reported the heavily armed militants disguised as the intelligence unit's security forces. The Toyota Hilux used in the attack was stopped twice at the presidential palace gates before heading to the prison, preventing an attack. The vehicle passed through seven checkpoints in total without being searched. The attack ended after an hours-long siege that resulted in the seven militants being killed. The government said no civilian or security officers were killed and no prisoners were freed but almost 25 people were injured.

== Reactions ==
Al-Shabaab claimed responsibility for the attack, saying they "freed all Muslim prisoners" and targeted the underground cell guarded by security forces.

The federal government ordered crackdown on fake military vehicles after the attack, calling it a "cowardly terrorist attack".

The African Union Support and Stabilization Mission in Somalia (AUSSOM) said they strongly condemned the attack, calling it "cowardly" and saying the group disrupts peace and stability and disregards human life in Mogadishu.

The Intergovernmental Authority on Development (IGAD) strongly condemned the attack, commending security forces in a statement for their swift response to prevent a greater tragedy.

Several Somali politicians, including former prime minister Abdi Farah Shirdon and former president Sharif Sheikh Ahmed, denounced the attack and called for an investigation.

== See also ==
- 2025 timeline of the Somali Civil War
- 2025 Shabelle offensive
- 2025 Mogadishu military base bombing
- Attempted assassination of Hassan Sheikh Mohamud
- 2025 Beledweyne hotel attack
- 2025 Jaalle Siyaad military academy bombing
- 2025 Garissa attack
