= Gush Etzion attack =

Gush Etzion attacks may refer to:

- 2014 Alon Shvut stabbing attack, Gush Etzion
- 2014 kidnapping and murder of Israeli teenagers, Alon Shvut, Gush Etzion
- 2015 Gush Etzion Junction attack
- 2019 Gush Etzion ramming attack
- 2025 Gush Etzion attack
