= 2025 Karkur junction ramming attack =

2025 attack in Israel

- Part of Palestinian political violence
- Location: 32.465146°N 34.993923°E; Karkur junction, Israel
- Date: 27 February 2025 c.4:18 p.m.
- Target: Israeli civilians
- Attack type: vehicle-ramming attack
- Deaths: Yaheli Gur
- Injuries: 13
- Perpetrator: Jamil Zayoud
- Motive: Palestinian nationalism

The 2025 Karkur junction attack was a deadly vehicle-ramming attack that took place at a bus stop on 27 February 2025 in the Karkur junction. Seventeen year old Yaheli Gur was killed and 13 were injured. The perpetrator was shot and killed by police after the spree.

Vehicle ramming attacks targeting civilians have become an increasing weapon and security threat in Israel and Western countries.

== Attack ==
A Palestinian Arab man struck 14 pedestrians who were waiting at the bus stop, with his car at the Karkur junction. He continued driving for four kilometers. The assailant accelerated his car and rammed a police car. He then exited his vehicle, threatening the police with a screw driver. He was shot and killed by police. The attack was called in to Magen David Adom emergency services at 4:18 p.m.

== Victims ==
17-year-old Yaheli Gur, a student at nearby Harish high school, was killed by the ramming attack. Thirteen others were injured in varying degrees of severity. A 60-year-old man and a 19-year-old woman were both treated in serious condition. One police officer was injured during the arrest of the assailant.

The victims were treated at Hillel Yaffe Medical Center in Hadera.

== Perpetrator ==
The perpetrator was identified as a 53-year-old Palestinian man named Jamil Zayoud, who was originally from the Jenin area. Zayoud had been living illegally in nearby Ma'ale Iron with his Arab Israeli wife. In 2021 he was indicted for driving illegally, without a license, according to Ha'aretz newspaper.

== Aftermath ==
Hamas praised the attack, stating that it is a "natural, heroic response to the brutal aggression and ongoing crimes" committed by Israel.

== See also ==
- List of terrorist incidents in 2025
- 2025 Gush Etzion Junction attack
- 2025 Ramot Junction shooting
- 2025 Bat Yam bus bombings
- 2025 al-Funduq shooting
- 2025 northern Israel stabbing and ramming attack
- Karkur junction suicide bombing
