= 2025 timeline of the Somali Civil War =

African civil war timeline

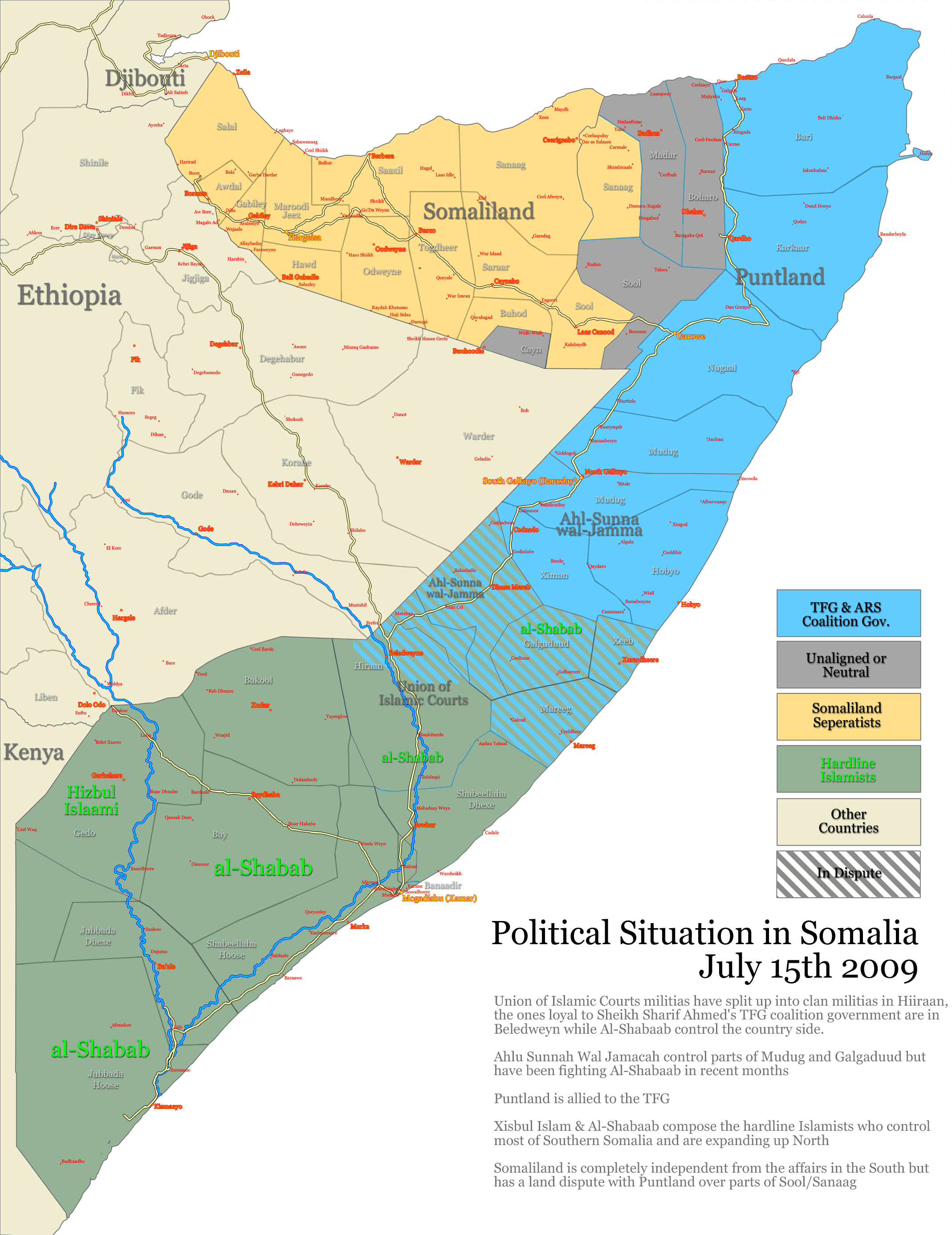

This is a 2025 timeline of events in the Somali Civil War (1991–present).

== January ==
- 5 January: At least 10 al-Shabaab militants were killed in an airstrike in Beerxaani area, northwest of Kismayo.
- 11 January: With the help of local militias, Somaliland forces captured Jiidali, a town east of Erigavo.
- 15 January: Several ISIS fighters were killed and five were captured—including foreign fighters—in an offensive by Puntland Security Forces in Cal Miskaad mountains in the Bari region. The operation also led to the destruction of 8 militant bases. 9 explosive drones were also shot down during the operation.
- 21 January: 13 soldiers of the Puntland Security Forces were killed in a roadside bomb explosion during a counter-terrorism operation in Habley area, Bari region.
- 23 January: Three al-Shabaab militants were killed and six wounded in an operation carried out by Somali National Army in Ceelgaras village, Galgaduud region.
- 24 January: The Puntland Security Forces liberated the towns of Turmasaale and Janno-Jiifta from ISIS militants.
- 25 January: An offensive carried out by Puntland Security Forces captured a major militant base and killed 13 ISIS militants in Cal Miskaad mountains in the Bari region. Since the start of the offensive the security forces have destroyed or captured more than 100 bases and liberated 260 km of territory.
- 28 January: With support from local forces, the Somali National Army captured Beera Yabaal area in the Hiiraan region from al-Shabaab militants.
- 31 January:
  - In an operation with support from local forces, the Somali National Army killed 40 al-Shabaab militants in Hiraan region. The Army also intensified operations in al-Shabaab strongholds in Wargolole, Hooyaley, and Abagbeday, areas located north of Hudur district in preparation for a major offensive.
  - President Hassan Sheikh Mohamud and Prime Minister Hamza Abdi Barre narrowly escaped after security forces shot down one of two drones hovering over Villa Somalia.

== February ==
- 1 February: With support from local forces, the Somali National Army liberated Jicibow area in the Hiiraan region.
- 2 February:
  - An US airstrike killed many ISIS militants, including senior leaders, in Golis mountains, Puntland.
  - At least 50 combatants were killed after clashes between al-Shabaab and the Somali National Army along with Ma'awisley militias. The clashes happened in the Hiiraan and Middle Shabelle regions of Hirshabelle state.
- 3 February: Two al-Shabaab militants were killed and two captured when Security Forces foiled an attack in Kismayo.
- 4 February: At least 15 foreign ISIS militants were killed in an airstrike in the Tog-Jaceel mountains, Puntland.
- 6 February: The Somali National Army liberated the villages of Halgan and Buuloburd Hiraan region from al-Shabaab militants.
- 13 February: Two airstrikes conducted by Puntland Security Forces killed 30 ISIS militants in the al-Miskad mountain range in the Bari region.
- 14 February: 11 al-Shabaab militants, including a senior leader, were killed in an operation by Somali National Army in the Jowle area of Mudug Region.
- 16 February: Two ISIS militants were killed in an US airstrike in al-Miskad mountain range in Bari region.
- 17 February: An US airstrike targeting ISIS hideouts killed 16 militants in Bari region.
- 18 February: Somali National Army along with Maawisley militia recaptured the villages of Kiliga Mohamed Diirshe, Raas Qaboobe, Jameeco, Shanlow, Dhagaxoow, Yaaqle, Farbarako and Damiley villages along the Shabelle River from al-Shabaab militants, also inflicting heavy casualties on the militants.
- 20 February: Al-Shabaab launched attacks on several villages and military bases in the Middle Shabelle and Hiran region, causing the deaths of 130 al-Shabaab militants and dozens of Somali soldiers.
- 25 February: The Somalian government and the African Union finalize the troop distribution for the new peacekeeping mission AUSSOM, resolving prior disputes with Ethiopia and later Burundi. The mission will deploy 11,900 personnel, including soldiers, police, and civilian staff. Under the agreement, Uganda will contribute 4,500 troops, followed by Ethiopia with 2,500, Djibouti with 1,520, Kenya with 1,410, and Egypt with 1,091.
- 27 February:
  - Mogadishu, the Somali capital city, entered a security lockdown after several mortars were fired toward Aden Adde International Airport during a visit from Ethiopian Prime Minister Abiy Ahmed.
  - Somali forces regained control of Balad after al-Shabaab launched a coordinated attack, detonating roadside bombs and briefly seizing the town.
  - Villa Somalia security guards open fire on civilians at Lido Beach in Mogadishu while attempting to clear the beach ahead of a visit from Ethiopian Prime Minister Abiy Ahmed, killing a teenage boy and wounding several others.

== March ==
- 5 March: In a series of airstrikes in Middle Shabelle region, numerous al-Shabaab bases and 3 armored vehicles were destroyed and many militants were killed.
- 11 March: More than 18 civilians were killed after al-Shabaab attackers rammed an explosives-laden vehicle and sieged a Cairo hotel in Beledweyne.
- 14 March: 12 al-Shabaab militants were killed in clashes with Somali forces the Ambaluul area of Lower Shabelle.
- 15 March: Al-Shabaab militants took control of the Sumadale area near the town of Adale, killing 2082 Somali soldiers and injuring 10 others after forces from Mogadishu attempted to take back the area. Another 7 Somali soldiers were killed in clashes in the clashes in the Laba Garas area. Al-Shabaab also captured the town of Awdheegle following clashes with Somali forces. At least 31 Somali Army soldiers were killed in the clashes.
- 18 March: Hassan Sheikh Mohamud, president of Somalia, was targeted by al-Shabaab in a roadside bombing assassination attempt using improvised explosive devices near Villa Somalia, while his entourage headed to Aden Adde International Airport in Mogadishu. He narrowly survived.
- 20 March:
  - Al-Shabaab militants stormed and seized the town of Sabiid and its SNA base in Lower Shabelle region, located 40 km (25 mi) southwest of Mogadishu., killing at least 26 Somali soldiers in the attack.
  - Somali forces along with local militias began Major offensive and recaptured many towns and villages from Al-Shabaab militants in Middle Shabelle region.
- 21 March – An Airstrike by Somali forces killed 82 Al-Shabaab militants including Senior commanders in Lower Shabelle region.
- 23 March:
  - Al-Shabaab leaders flee Jilib following airstrikes by Somali forces
  - Al-Shabaab militants attacked a Kenyan border post in Garissa county on the Somali-Kenyan border, killing 6 Kenyan reserve soldiers and stealing multiple weapons.
- 24 March:
  - Al-Shabaab fired up to 10 mortar rounds at two SNA military bases near Afgooye, killing 8 Somali soldiers and wounding 6, with Hussein Haji Mohamed (Aw Koombe), an army officer, among the dead.
  - An Al-Shabaab IED in the Taredisho area on the outskirts of Mogadishu struck Somali army vehicle, killing 4 Somali soldiers and wounding another 3.

== April ==
- 9 April – Clashes erupted in the Aburi area of Bulubardi district in Hiraan State between al-Shabaab forces and Somali forces which resulted in the killing of 53 Somali soldiers, including Asad Osman Afrah, the commander of the Danab Brigade, and the injuring of 807 Somali soldiers.
- 16 April –
  - Al-Shabab fighters attacked Adan Yabaal in central Somalia, claiming control after fierce fighting with Somali government forces.
  - A US-Somali airstrike targeted al-Shabab militants during heavy fighting for Adan Yabaal.

== May ==
- 2025 Mogadishu military base bombing– A bomb planted by Al-Shabaab targeted Damaanyo military base in Mogadishu, killing 20 people and injuring 15 others. Most of the casualties were recruits who came for the recruitment for joining Somali National Army.

== June ==
- June 2 – Al-Shabaab militants have reportedly taken control of Hawadley village, located 91 kilometers northeast of Mogadishu, after Burundian forces under the African Union Support and Stabilization Mission in Somalia (AUSSOM) withdrew from the strategic military base.
- June 7 – An operation executed by the SNA eliminated more than 40 Al-Shabaab militants including two Senior commanders. The Commanders were Abuu Anas, who was Al-Shabaab ’s chief logistics coordinator for combat units, and Mohamed Ahmed, a senior field commander.
- June 8 – Three Senior Field commanders of Al-Shabaab was killed in an operation by SNA in Central Hiraan region.
- June 11 – Kenyan Security Forces killed two Al-Shabaab militants while others fled with injuries. The clash occurred when militants were trying to set up an IED in a roadside in Mandera County, Kenya.
- June 12 –
  - An operation by SNA killed 13 Al-Shabaab militants in middle Shabelle region.
  - Al-Shabaab militants captured the town of El Hareeri in Hiraan region pushing out SNA and local militias from the area.

== August ==
- August 14 – At least three people were killed amid fierce clashes between security forces and local militants in Somalia's capital, Mogadishu, due to tensions over demolishes residential building evictions.
