= Jaalle Siyaad military academy bombing =

The Jaalle Siyaad military academy bombing may refer to:

- 2023 Jaalle Siyaad military academy bombing
- 2025 Jaalle Siyaad military academy bombing
