= 2025 Harod Valley attack =

2025 attack in Israel

2025 northern Israel stabbing and ramming attack
- Part of Palestinian political violence
- Location: Harod Valley, Northern District, Israel
- Date: 26 December 2025
- Target: Israeli civilians
- Attack type: vehicle-ramming attack and mass stabbing, Palestinian political violence
- Deaths: 2 Shimshon Mordecai, Aviv Maor
- Injuries: 3 (including the perpetrator)

On December 26, 2025, two civilians were killed and at least two others were injured in a combined vehicle-ramming and stabbing attack in Harod Valley, Northern District, Israel. The perpetrator was later shot and arrested. Israeli police stated they were investigating the incident as a terrorist attack.

== Attack ==
According to Israeli police and emergency services, the attacker first rammed a 16-year-old teenager with his car, injuring him, after which he exited the vehicle and attempted to stab the boy, who escaped. The perpetrator drove onto a path designated for cyclists, killing Shimshon Mordechai, a disabled civilian.

The attacker continued towards Ein Harod, ramming a car near Kibbutz Tel Yosef, injuring a woman. The assailant exited the vehicle, and stabbed the woman, Aviv Maor, while she attempted to escape, killing her.

The assailant fled the scene and was later shot by security forces and an armed civilian near the city of Afula.

== Victims ==
Two people were killed and two others were injured. The deceased victims were identified as 68-year-old Shimshon Mordechai and 18-year-old Aviv Maor. A 16-year-old boy was injured and was transported to Emek Medical Center in light condition. A 37-year-old man sustained a head injury and was taken to the Rambam Health Care Campus in Haifa.

== Suspect ==
The suspect was identified as Ahmed al-Rub, 37, of the village of Qabatiya in the West Bank who infiltrated Israel several days ago. Police said the motive was under investigation and had not been formally confirmed at the time, though the incident was being treated as a suspected terror attack. The day after the attack, al-Rub was discharged from the Emek Medical Center in Afula and was taken into custody. Police and the Shin Bet announced that they arrested two of his brothers during a nighttime raid on a building near Arraba.

== Investigation ==
Police launched a manhunt following the initial attacks and increased security presence in the area. Officials stated that the investigation was ongoing and that further details would be released as confirmed.

== Aftermath ==
Hamas praised the attack, calling it an "expression of the growing, popular anger" and a "result of the Zionist occupation’s daily crimes" but did not claim responsibility.

== See also ==
- List of terrorist incidents in 2025
- 2025 Gush Etzion Junction attack
- 2025 Ramot Junction shooting
- 2025 Bat Yam bus bombings
- 2025 al-Funduq shooting
- 2025 Karkur junction ramming attack
