= Adult Commercial Secondary School =

Secondary school in Somalia

- Hodan District, Mogadishu; Somalia

Information
- Type: Commercial Secondary School
- Established: November 2006; 20 years ago

The Adult Commercial Secondary School (ACSS) was established in November 2006 in Mogadishu, Somalia.

== History ==
Following the outbreak of the Somali Civil War in 1991, the task of running schools in Somalia was initially taken up by community education committees established in 94% of the local schools (Ihebuzor, Noel 2005). Numerous problems had arisen with regard to access to education in rural areas and along gender lines, quality of educational provisions, responsiveness of school curricula, educational standards and controls, management and planning capacity, and financing. To address these concerns, the intellectual people established schools and most of these schools follow the national educational policy for primary, intermediate and secondary schools.

However, Adult Commercial Secondary School was established in 2006 by a group of academicians in Hodan District, Mogadishu-Somalia. Currently, the school provides business and accounting subjects as well as the introductory of science subjects and computer fundamentals. The first batch graduated in the academic year of 2008–2009 with 51 students including male and female, and at the moment the school consists of two branches; one is located in Mogadishu, the capital of the state, and the other center in Middle Shabelle Region in central zones of Somalia.
