= 2025 Gush Etzion Junction attack =

2025 attack in the West Bank

2025 Gush Etzion Junction ramming and stabbing attack
- Part of Palestinian political violence during the Gaza war
- Location: Gush Etzion Junction, West Bank
- Date: 18 November 2025 c.2:00 p.m.
- Target: Israelis
- Attack type: Attempted vehicle-ramming attack and mass stabbing
- Deaths: 1 civilian (+ 2 perpetrators)
- Injuries: 3 (one by IDF collateral)
- Perpetrator: Palestinian Islamic Jihad
- Assailants: Walid Sabarneh, Amran al-Atrash
- Defender: Israel Defense Forces

On 18 November 2025, a vehicle-ramming attack and mass stabbing left at least three people killed, including both perpetrators, in the Gush Etzion Junction, West Bank. Three others were injured, including a child. Palestinian Islamic Jihad took credit for the attack.

== Attack ==
Two Palestinian men, identified as Walid Sabarneh of Beit Omar and Amran al-Atrash of Hebron, arrived by car at the Gush Etzion Junction at around 2 p.m.. They proceeded to turn right toward Jerusalem before accelerating toward the hitchhiking post and attempting to strike civilians. The attackers exited the vehicle and attempted to stab those in the area. A 60-year-old man was stabbed to death, and a man and child were both injured in the attacks.

The perpetrators were shot and killed by an IDF soldier.

== Aftermath ==
Palestinian Islamic Jihad took credit for the attack and congratulated the perpetrators, urging others to participate in similar attacks. Hamas said the attack was "a natural response to Israel’s attempts to eliminate the Palestinian cause and to the rampage of the occupation and the settlers in the West Bank".

== See also ==
- 2014 Alon Shvut stabbing attack
- 2015 Gush Etzion Junction attack
- 2019 Gush Etzion ramming attack
- 2025 al-Funduq shooting
- 2025 Ramot Junction shooting
- 2025 northern Israel stabbing and ramming attack
- 2025 Karkur junction ramming attack
