= 2023 Mogadishu attack =

2023 Mogadishu attack may refer to:

- 2023 Mogadishu hotel attack, in June
- Mogadishu military academy bombing, in July
- Mogadishu tea shop bombing, in September
