= 2013 Bat Yam bus bombing =

Terrorist attack in Israel

Coordinates: 32.0220°N 34.7545°E

- The attack site
- Location: Bat Yam, Israel
- Date: 22 December 2013; 12 years ago c. 2:30 pm
- Attack type: Bus bombing
- Weapon: Pressure cooker bomb
- Deaths: 0
- Injuries: 0
- No. of participants: 4

On 22 December 2013, at approximately 2:30 pm, a pressure cooker bomb exploded on a public bus in Bat Yam, Israel. All casualties were averted because a few minutes earlier, a passenger on the bus had examined the contents of an unattended bag, and saw what looked like a bomb inside, which led all passengers and the driver to exit the vehicle. The bombing shattered or blew out all windows on the bus, and significantly damaged the interior.

On 2 January 2014, the Shin Bet announced it had arrested four Palestinian Islamic Jihad operatives for the bombing, including one individual who was a Palestinian Authority police officer. The Islamic Jihad cell had reportedly been planning a larger bombing in Tel Aviv as well.

It was the first terrorist bombing in Israel since the 2012 Tel Aviv bus bombing in Tel Aviv.

== Bombing ==
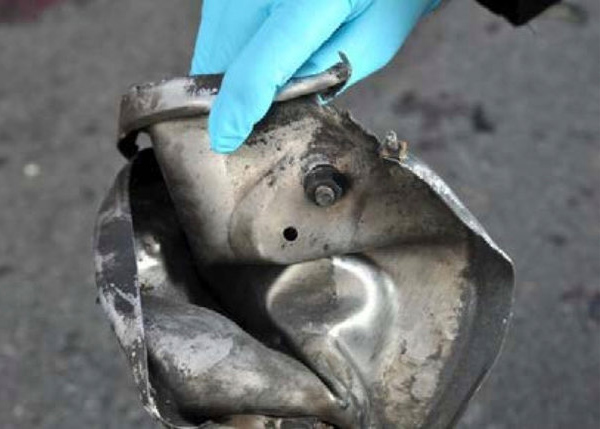
A pressure cooker bomb, similar in design to one used in the 2013 Boston Marathon bombings (fragment pictured), detonated on the bus in Bat Yam.

In the early afternoon of 22 December 2013, a young boy on public bus Dan No. 240 in Bat Yam remarked aloud that there was an unattended bag present near him. Passenger David Papo, who overheard the boy, alerted bus driver Michael Yoger, who asked the passengers whose bag it was, but received no affirmative answer. Papo then opened the large, black bag and found "what he said looked like a pressure cooker with a red wire coming out of it." He told people to get off the bus, and when the driver stopped the vehicle at the corner of Mivtza Sinai st. and Katznelson st. in Bat Yam, all the passengers and the driver exited.

The Israeli police received a call at 2:20 p.m. about a bomb on a bus in Bat Yam. The device then detonated, three minutes after the last passengers had been evacuated. All the windows on the bus "were either blown out or shattered" by the explosion and "seats were mangled." It was the first terrorist bombing in Israel since a November 21, 2012 bus bombing in Tel Aviv.

According to Israel's internal security service Shin Bet, the bomb "consisted of two kilograms of improvised explosives surrounded by nails and screws and stuffed into a pressure cooker."

The Jerusalem Post commented, "Like in many past bombings in Israel, tragedy was prevented by the actions of everyday citizens, who helped clear other passengers away from the blast."

== Capture of suspects ==
After a news blackout was lifted late on 2 January 2014, Israel's Shin Bet announced it had arrested "four Islamic Jihad operatives from Bethlehem and 10 other people," including a Bedouin citizen of Israel. The four operatives "were named as Yusef Salamah, 22, Shehada Ta’amri, 24, Hamdi Ta’amri, 21 and Sami Harimi, 20." Shehada and Hamdi are brothers. At the time of the bombing, Hamdi was serving as "a Palestinian Authority police officer" and "was in the middle of officer's candidate school in Jericho."

According to the Shin Bet, the bomb was built by Salamah and the two brothers. On the morning of 22 December, Harimi traveled south from Bethlehem, carrying the bomb in a black bag. In the southern Hebron hills, Harimi crossed into Israel through a hole in the Israeli West Bank barrier along with a group of Palestinian workers.

Once in Israel, Harimi received a ride to Jaffa from "a Bedouin citizen of Israel, who earned money transporting illegals into Israel to work." Before the bombing, Harimi had illegally worked at the Abulafia Bakery in Jaffa. Once in Jaffa, according to the Shin Bet, Harimi first prayed in a mosque and then boarded the 420 bus. He left the bag with the bomb in the center of the vehicle and then got off the bus. A few minutes later, around 2:30 p.m., Harimi called the cellular device attached to the bomb and it detonated.

According to The Times of Israel, the bomb design was similar to that used in the Boston Marathon bombings earlier that year.

During his interrogation, Harimi said that the cell was planning a larger bombing in Tel Aviv. 25 kilograms of explosive material were confiscated when the cell was arrested.

== Reaction ==
- Israel: Chief of the Israeli police Yohanan Danino said, "The incident in Bat Yam shows the threat of terror is always in the background, and in particular, in times like now, when there is an attempt to advance the peace process." In a statement, Prime Minister Benjamin Netanyahu said that the involvement of a Palestinian police officer in the bombing was "further proof of direct involvement of people in the Palestinian Authority in terror activity." President Shimon Peres phoned and thanked bus driver Michael Yoger and passenger David Papo for their actions that saved lives.
- Palestine: Hamas and Palestinian Islamic Jihad "welcomed" the attack, but neither claimed responsibility. In an official press release, Hamas spokesman Fawzi Barhoum said the bombing was a "response to the crimes of the occupation." In an interview with Hamas's Al Aqsa TV, senior Palestinian Islamic Jihad operative Ahmed Almadalel stated, "there are many operations such as this – carried out by lone individuals or organizations – and it only stresses the fact that the conflict with the Zionist enemy is far from over. I believe that the acts will continue and we would like to stress, as ever, that we are on the verge of a huge explosion in the face of our Zionist enemy for its crimes against our people."
- United States: The U.S. government condemned the bombing, stating "violent acts targeting civilians are deplorable."

== See also ==
- 2025 Bat Yam bus bombings
