= 2025 Mogadishu military base bombing =

Suicide bombing in Mogadishu, Somalia

- Part of the Somali Civil War
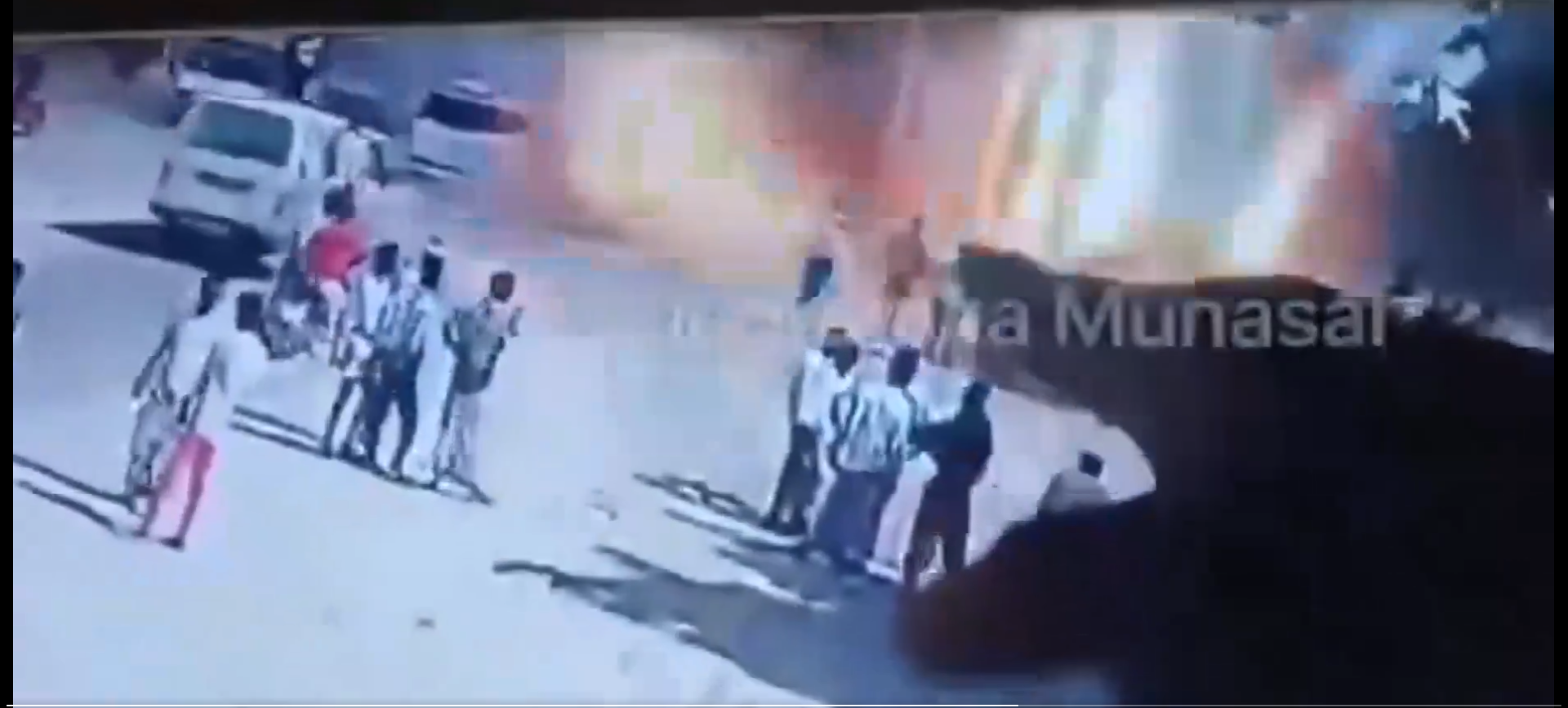
- A CCTV still of the explosion
- Location: Damaanyo military base, Hodan, Mogadishu, Somalia
- Date: 18 May 2025 c.9:20 a.m. (EAT)
- Target: Recruits
- Attack type: Suicide bombing
- Weapon: Bomb
- Deaths: 21 (including the perpetrator)
- Injuries: 15
- Perpetrator: Al-Shabaab
- No. of participants: 1
- Motive: Terrorism

On 18 May 2025, an Al-Shabaab suicide bomber killed at least 20 people, 15 recruits and five civilians nearby, outside the gates of Damaanyo military base where hundreds of young men had been lined up to enlist in the Somali National Army in Hodan neighbourhood of Mogadishu. Another 15 others were seriously injured in the bombing, including some critically, and the death toll is expected to rise due to the severity of the injuries.

== Background ==
Al-Shabaab, a fundamentalist militant group and ally of al-Qaeda, has waged an insurgency for more than a decade and continues to control parts of southern and central Somalia. The group failed to assassinate Somali president Hassan Sheikh Mohamud in a March 18, 2025 attack.

=== Major offensives in southern Somalia ===
On 20 February 2025, al-Shabaab started a new offensive in Hirshabelle State called "Operation Ramadan" against the Somali National Army, African Union Mission in Somalia forces, and allied Ma'awisley clan militias (Somali: Macawiisleey). The militant group's objective was to regain territory lost in the 2022 ground offensive led by the Federal Government and African Union, particularly strategic towns and supply routes, and to take control of Somalia's capital Mogadishu. Within the first day of the offensive, al-Shabaab took over more than 15 towns and villages in the regions of Middle Shabelle, Hiran, and Lower Shabelle.

=== Beledweyne hotel attack and siege ===
On 11 March 2025, six al-Shabaab attackers stormed the Cairo Hotel in Beledweyne, detonating a suicide car bomb and launching a 24-hour siege. The hotel was hosting clan elders and military officials coordinating Shabelle offensives. More than 21 people were killed, including all six attackers and two traditional elders, while dozens were injured.

The suicide bombing occurred on May 17, 2025, following the assassination of Colonel Abdirahman Hujaale, commander of Battalion 26, in the Hiiran region. This occurred in the context of local reports of the al-Shabaab armed group's infiltration into government and security forces.

=== Mogadishu military academy bombing ===
Similar military base bombing occurred in 2023 at the Jaalle Siyaad military academy bombing, which is across from the Damanyo facility, where a suicide bomber murdered twenty-five soldiers.

== Bombing ==
On Sunday morning around 9:20 a.m. of 18 May 2025, a suicide bomber attacked a military recruitment center in Mogadishu and caused many casualties. CCTV camera shows the bomber, intercepted near the entrance, detonating explosives before reaching the main crowd. The bomber was dressed in a military uniform detonated an explosive suicide vest, targeting hundreds of young men had lined up to enlist in the Somali National Army who were lining up after breakfast. According to security officials, who spoke to Hiiraan Online without identifying themselves, they believed at least 10 soldiers were killed instantly and more than 15 were injured.

The Al-Shabaab claimed responsibility for the attack and posted on Telegram that hundred soldiers were killed and others injured. Most of the soldiers targeted were young troops who want to join government war against al-shabaab in middle shabelle. Among those killed were 15 recruits and five civilians who were passing nearby. Medical personnel at nearby military hospitals said some of the wounded remain in critical condition, and the death toll could rise.

== Aftermath ==
On 20 May 2025, Al-Shabaab claimed responsibility for launching at least six rounds of mortar fire that caused damage to properties in the vicinity of Aden Adde International Airport in Somalia's capital, Mogadishu. The affected area includes the Halane base camp, which hosts United Nations offices, African Union personnel, and various diplomatic missions.

In a separate incident in Hirshabelle State, a militant mortar attack killed three Somali Armed Forces personnel at the Hiilweyne military barracks near Bal’ad town in the Middle Shabelle region.

== Reactions ==
=== Domestic ===
Former Somali President Sharif Sheikh Ahmed, condemned Al-Shabaab suicide attack and described the incident "Heinous attack" as he disregarded the group's for human life while falsely claiming Islamic motives. He also criticizes Hassan Sheikh Mohamud and Hamza Abdi Barre administration for failing to secure and protect the camp.

Former Somali Prime Minister, Mohamed Hussein Roble, posted a condolence on X following a suicide bombing and requested a government investigation and additional public vigilance.

Somali people expressed outrage in social media after a celebratory event was held in Mogadishu less than an hour after a violent incident. Critics condemned Prime Minister Hamza Abdi Barre's party for dancing at a festive gathering while a suicide bombing at the Damaanyo military camp, located just one kilometre away, while dozens of youths were killed others hospitalized.

=== International ===
Arab Parliament, Egypt, Jordan, Kuwait, Saudi Arabia, and United Arab Emirates, strongly condemned the suicide attack.
