= 2019 Gush Etzion ramming attack =

Terrorist incident in the West Bank

- Location: Gush Etzion
- Date: 16 August 2019
- Target: Israelis
- Attack type: Ramming
- Deaths: 1 (the perpetrator)
- Injuries: 2

In the afternoon of 16 August 2019, a Palestinian driver hit two Israelis, outside the Gush Etzion settlement of Elazar. An off duty policeman saw the attack and shot the assailant who later died in the hospital.

== Attack ==
The perpetrator was speeding on Route 60 which connects the West Bank and Gush Etzion. He swerved off the road near a bus station outside the settlement of Elazar and rammed his car into two people, crashing over the guard railing.

A Hebron police officer who was on his way home after completing a shift noticed the attack and shot the driver as he was getting out of the vehicle. He also recorded the terror attack on his dashcam.

== Victims ==
The victims, identified as Nahum and Noam Nevis, were both from Elazar.

== Perpetrator ==
The Palestinian driver, Ala' Khader al-Hreimi, 26, from Bethlehem, had spent time in prison between 2014 and 2015 for unspecified violent activities. He later died of gunshot wounds in hospital.

== See also ==
- 2025 Gush Etzion attack
- 2015 Gush Etzion Junction attack
- 2014 Alon Shvut stabbing attack
