= 2025 French prison attacks =

Terrorist attacks

- Location: French prisons and related sites
- Date: 13 April 2025 – present
- Target: French justice and penal system
- Attack type: Attacks on vehicles, shooting, arson, terrorist attack
- Deaths: 0

A series of terrorist attacks in France started on 13 April 2025, and spanned several days, targeting multiple prisons and penitentiary-related places and targets across France with arson attacks on vehicles and automatic weapon fire.

The locations targeted included the National School of Prison Administration, Toulon-La Farlède prison, Nanterre prison, Aix-Luynes prison, Valence prison, the South-Francilien prison, Tarascon prison, the home of a prison guard in Méaux and social housing occupied by prison guards in Marseille. In total, 24 vehicles were set on fire and around fifteen bullets were fired at the gate of Toulon-La Farlède prison.

== Background ==
France is one of the largest consumers of cannabis in Western Europe, and the global trend is leaning toward the legalization of its recreational use—with French public opinion generally favourable to such an initiative—French Interior Minister Gérald Darmanin, who was Justice Minister at the time, defended a highly punitive and repressive policy toward drug traffickers and users. He announced a project to place the two hundred individuals he considered the most dangerous drug traffickers in a new prison under a new solitary confinement regime. The plan was criticised by the general inspector of prisons, who saw it as potentially designed to drive inmates insane. Darmanin aimed to expand the measure to include 600 to 700 prisoners and to increase the number of such facilities to "four or five". On 14 April 2025, the same day the attacks began, the minister made public a plan to create new prisons built using prefabricated structures, which would allow the state to rapidly and cheaply construct additional prison spaces.

A few days before the attacks, a Telegram group called DDPF (''Défense des droits des prisonniers français'' "Defense of the Rights of French Prisoners") was created. In this channel, messages and threats were shared targeting prison guards and French prison authorities, including statements such as "Guards, resign while you still can if you care about your families and loved ones" and "Know that our movement is spreading throughout France". In this group, the militants stated that they intended to act in this way in response to prison overcrowding, because prisons have reached 131% occupancy, among other issues. They claimed not to be terrorists but to be acting in defence of human rights, which they said were under threat. In this channel, they sent messages saying, for example:

"For several years now, a majority of the guards have been humiliating, insulting, and physically abusing the detained individuals. When the prisoners file a complaint or appeal, they end up being transferred to the opposite end of France or subjected to repeated, degrading searches ordered by the hierarchy [...] They do not respect the law in any way, but when it suits them, they enforce it strictly."

== Events ==
=== 13–14 April ===
Map of prisons and sites related to the French prison system that were attacked

The attacks unfolded in two phases. First, during the night of 13 to 14 April 2025, seven vehicles were set on fire in the parking lot of the National School of Prison Administration in Agen. That same night, a guard's vehicle was torched at the prison centre in Réau.

=== 14–15 April ===
The following day, on 15 April 2025 around 1 A.M., several individuals opened fire at the facade of the Toulon-La Farlède prison. One of the weapons used was an AK-47 and fired about fifteen rounds into the front of the building. Several individuals were reportedly seen inside a vehicle during the attack. A large “DDPF” symbol was found spray-painted on the entrance used by prison transport vehicles.

The prisons of Nanterre in Hauts-de-Seine, Aix-Luynes, and Valence were targeted by vehicle arson attacks. Anarchist slogans were found at some of the sites. The inscription "DDPF", was spray-painted on cars in the parking lots of the Nîmes and Luynes prisons.

In Marseille, vehicles belonging to several prison guards were set on fire in the parking lot of the social housing where they lived. The full toll, in addition to the gunfire on the facade of Toulon-La Farlède prison, amounted to 21 vehicles burned.

=== 15–16 April ===
Three vehicles were set on fire in the parking lot of the Tarascon prison, in the Bouches-du-Rhône. In Villenoy, in Seine-et-Marne, a fire broke out in the stairwell of a building housing a prison officer. The inscription "DDPF" was also found on a wall of the building.

=== April 21 ===
Shortly before 3 a.m. on Monday, April 21, two homes were targeted by heavy gunfire and Molotov cocktails in Villefontaine, Isère. These homes are located in a residential area where several prison officers assigned to Corbas or Saint-Quentin-Fallavier live. However, investigators found that the two houses targeted were not inhabited by prison staff. One, in particular, was occupied by a couple in their sixties with no connection to the administration.

=== May 2 ===
Prosecutors said Saturday that 21 suspects in a series of coordinated attacks on French prisons had been charged, including two teenagers.

=== May 5–6 ===
For just over a minute, a group of four men, dressed in dark blue jumpsuits, hooded, and equipped with automatic weapons, film themselves in action using an on-board camera. The attack, although it caused no injuries, damaged three vehicles, the lobby of a building and the bay window of an apartment.

== Investigation ==
The Ministry of Justice referred to the attacks as “coordinated”. Justice Minister Gérald Darmanin stated on the social network X that the attacks showed that the “Republic [was] confronted with drug trafficking”.

The national anti-terrorist prosecutor’s office and the General Directorate for Internal Security (DGSI) took charge of the investigation. At the outset, the drug trafficking theory—put forward by Gérald Darmanin—was in opposition to the possibility of one or more anarchist groups being responsible, since the “DDPF” slogans appeared to reflect anti-prison anarchist ideology.

While the French authorities initially favored the idea of an anarchist group, this theory has become increasingly unlikely as the investigation has turned towards drug trafficking.

A first potential member—a former inmate on semi-release, suspected by French authorities of belonging to the group—was arrested on 16 April 2025, in Essonne.

The ministry said that its investigation into the group may involve charges like "attempted murder with a terrorist outfit committed against a person in a position of public authority".

== Aftermath ==
On 15 April 2025, Darmanin visited the Toulon prison, which had been targeted by gunfire, and declared that he would “not give in” stating that there were "clearly people trying to destabilize the state through intimidation". He expressed his desire for the acts to be classified as terrorism and voiced support for prison guards. A trade union leader from Force Ouvrière within the prison staff stated that the incident had left a mark on guards. He said, "It could have been much more tragic. The violence keeps escalating. I believe this is a declaration of war. And what we fear is that it will continue."

Another official complained that politicians and their superiors would not listen to them or grant their requests. On 16 April, the Paris police prefect requested reinforced police protection for penitentiary facilities.
