= Kobé attack =

2025 Islamist attack in Gao Region, Mali

- Part of Mali War
Date	February 7, 2025
Location	Near Kobé, Gao Region, Mali
Result	Indecisive

Belligerents
Mali; Wagner Group	Islamic State; Islamic State - Sahel Province

Casualties and losses
20+ killed or wounded	19 killed
- 34 civilians killed 34 civilians injured

On February 7, 2025, jihadists suspected to be from the Islamic State – Sahel Province (ISGS) attacked a civilian convoy being escorted by Malian and Wagner Group soldiers near Kobé, Mali, in between Gao and Ansongo. At least 20 Malian soldiers were killed or injured along with a similar number of militants, and 34 civilians were killed during the attack.

== Background ==
Southeastern Mali, particularly Ménaka Region and Gao Region along the Nigerien and Burkinabe borders, has been a hub of activity from the Islamic State since 2017. In 2022, the group launched an offensive targeting Malian and allied forces in the region, leading to ISGS seizing all of Menaka region except for the namesake capital city. Both Gao and Ansongo are located in Gao region just west of Menaka, and ISGS has tried to gain a foothold in the area in recent years. Malian and Wagner soldiers have engaged in battle with ISGS militants along the Gao-Ansongo highway before, with the militants often imposing taxes on travelers.

== Attack ==
On February 7, a convoy left the city of Gao and set off for Ansongo. According to Human Rights Watch, the convoy contained 19 civilian vehicles carrying more than a hundred civilians, escorted by five military vans and several motorcycles carrying Malian troops and allied Wagner Group forces. Both AFP and RFI reported that the convoy contained 22 minibuses, six large buses, and eight trucks escorted by ten military vehicles. The civilians were mostly gold miners of foreign nationalities, who were trying to reach a site near the Intahaka gold mine along the border with Niger.

Witnesses said that the gunshots from the attackers were sudden, and several survivors jumped off the caravan and played dead to survive. No group claimed responsibility for the attack, but ISGS is active in the area.

== Aftermath ==
The Malian government released a statement on February 8 stating only three vehicles were hit, causing the death of 25 civilians and injury of 13 others. Malian officials also stated "19 terrorist bodies" were found in the aftermath of the attack. On February 8 and 9, AFP and RFI reported that at least 30 people were killed in the attack. On February 24, RFI reported that at least 20 Malian soldiers had been killed or injured in the attack. Human Rights Watch reported that 34 civilians, including 13 Malians and 21 foreigners, were killed in the attack. 34 others were injured per HRW, including 20 Malians and 14 foreigners, mostly from Niger.

Following the attack, transporters in Gao region went on strike to demand an end to army escorts and an increase in army checkpoints along the Gao-Ansongo highway.
