= 2025 Katsina mosque attack =

Attack worshipers in Mantau community, Katsina state, Nigeria

- Location: Unguwan Mantau, Malumfashi, Katsina State, Nigeria,
- Date: 19 August 2025
- Deaths: 32-50
- Victims: 100 abducted
- Perpetrator: Armed bandits

The Katsina mosque attack occurred on 19 August 2025, when armed bandits stormed a mosque in Unguwan Mantau, Malumfashi local government area, Katsina State, Nigeria, during dawn (Fajr) prayer. The gunmen opened fire on worshippers, killing at least 17 people, according to the Katsina State Government. However, some local sources and international media reported that the death toll could be as high as 27.

== Background ==
Officials stated that the assault was a retaliation attack, following an earlier incident in which local vigilantes ambushed bandits, rescued abductees, and seized their weapons. The attack shows that the issue of banditry in the northwest continues to intensify.

== Aftermath ==
According to BBC Hausa, 28 people were killed, while attackers set women and children ablaze inside their homes and abducted nearly 100 people. The Katsina state government mobilized soldiers, police, and air force units to Unguwan Mantau to restore order. The violence also forced many residents to flee the community, leaving dozens displaced. Public figures, including former minister Isa Ali Pantami, condemned the killings he also called for improved security technology to track perpetrators. The death toll later rose to 32 following the mosque attack in Mantau village. The total number of fatalities in the attack exceeded 50.
