= 2025 Makhachkala clash =

Clash between Russian security forces and Dagestani militants in Makhachkala

Date	5 May 2025
Location	Makhachkala, Dagestan, Russia
Result	Indecisive

Belligerents
Russia	Dagestani militants

Units involved
Police of Russia	Dagestani militant cell

Casualties and losses
3 killed, 4+ wounded	2 killed, 1 injured
- 3 civilians injured

The 2025 Makhachkala clash was a spontaneous clash between Dagestani militants and the local police upon a routine stop conducted by traffic police, leaving several police officers and militants dead.

== Timeline ==
On the afternoon of 5 May, local traffic police conducted a stop of a vehicle driven by armed militants, who began firing at the officers. Over the course of an extended shootout, 3 officers and a militant were killed, and several more, including civilians, were injured. Some of the assailants are reported to have successfully fled by vehicle, prompting a manhunt, while 2 others were injured and detained thereafter.

In the aftermath of the shootout, 2 police officers, and 3 civilians, including a 17-year old girl were brought into a local hospital for treatment. The injured militants were also brought there, and one of them later succumbed to their injuries.

Due to no group claiming responsibility and the successful escape of several of the militants, it is yet to be known if the militants had any affiliations to active Islamist groups in the region or were acting on their own.

== See also ==
- 2024 Dagestan attacks
