= 2025 Federal Constabulary headquarters attack =

Bombing in Peshawar, Pakistan

- Part of Insurgency in Khyber Pakhtunkhwa
| Date | 24 November 2025 |
| Location | Peshawar, Pakistan |

Belligerents
| Pakistani Taliban | Pakistan |

Units involved
| Jamaat-ul-Ahrar | Unknown |

Strength
| 1 suicide bomber 2 armed militants | Unknown |

Casualties and losses
| 1 suicide bomber killed 2 armed militants killed | 3 killed 11 injured |

On the morning of November 24, 2025, a suicide bomber blew himself up outside the Federal Constabulary headquarters in Peshawar, Pakistan, killing three officers and wounding two more. Two armed men then attempted to enter the building and opened fire, wounding nine more people, before both were shot and killed. Jamaat-ul-Ahrar, a faction of the internationally designated terrorist group Tehrik-e-Taliban Pakistan, claimed responsibility for the attack.
