= 2023 Jaalle Siyaad military academy bombing =

Al-Shabaab attacked Jaalle Siad Military Academy

Jaalle Siyaad military academy bombing
- Native name: Weerarkii Kuliyadda Jaalle Siyaad
- Location: Mogadishu, Somalia
- Date: 24 July 2023
- Target: Jaalle Siad military academy
- Attack type: suicide bombing
- Deaths: 25 (Somali Government claim) 73 (Al-Shabaab claim)
- Injuries: 70 (Somali Government claim) 124 (Al-Shabaab claim)
- Victim: 14th October Brigade
- Perpetrator: Al-Shabaab
- No. of participants: 1 suicide bomber

Jaalle Siyaad military academy bombing occurred on 24 July 2023 after an al-Shabaab suicide bomber targeted 14th October Brigade of Somali armed forces, which is killed at least 25 and injured more than 70 soldiers at a Jaalle Siyaad military academy in Mogadishu, Somalia.

== Background ==
Jihadist militant group al-Shabaab began an insurgency in 2006, attempting to overthrow the internationally backed Somali government. Al-Shabaab controls parts of rural south and central Somalia and often attacks key places in Mogadishu. Its attacks include many against military, political and civilian targets, often in the country's capital city, Mogadishu.

Since August 2022, the Somali Armed Forces, alongside local fighters (Somali: Macawiisley) have been conducting operations against Al-Shabaab as part of a federal government offensive to reclaim areas under the group's control and halt the collection of illegal taxes.

These efforts aim to drive Al-Shabaab out of more territories. In response, the militant has carried out attacks on civilian buildings, including hotels and restaurants, as well as military and political targets. Somalia's army is preparing to take full responsibility for the country's security as African Union forces gradually withdraw. Countries like the United States, the European Union, and Turkey are also assisting in training Somali soldiers.

== Bombing ==
On Monday morning of July 23, 2023, a suicide bomber attacked Mogadishu’s Jaalle Siyaad Military Academy and caused many casualties.

The bomber was dressed in a military uniform detonated an explosive suicide vest, targeting soldiers who were lining up after breakfast. whereas, it is unclear how he accessed the tightly secured base.

According to two Somali military officers, who spoke to VOA without identifying themselves, they believed at least 25 soldiers were killed and more than 70 were injured. Among the injured, 24 are in serious condition.

The Al-Shabaab claimed responsibility for the attack and posted on Telegram that 73 soldiers were killed and 124 injured.

Most of the soldiers targeted were from the 14th October Brigade (Somali: Guutada 14 Oktoober), which was named to honor the victims of a 2017 terrorist attack at Mogadishu’s Zobe junction that killed more than 600 people.

== See also ==
- 2025 Mogadishu military base bombing
