= 2025 Garissa attack =

2025 attack in Garrisa, Kenya

2025 Garrisa attack
- Part of the Spillover of the Somali Civil War
- Date: March 23, 2025
- Time: 10:32 a.m (EAT)
- Type: Shooting, stabbing, kidnapping
- Perpetrator: al-Shabaab
- Deaths: 8
- Injuries: 9

On 23 March 2025, at least six police officers were killed and five others were injured in an Al-Shabaab attack on a police reservists camp in Fafi, Garissa, Kenya. Furthermore two other militants were also killed.

== Background ==
Kenyan police officer was killed while another injured in a clash with Somalia's intelligence agency. Weapons belonging to the deceased officer and a police reservist were missing, reportedly in the hands of Somali soldier.

The U.S. Embassy in Kenya issued a travel advisory on March 18, 2025, warning its citizens against visiting certain areas due to threats of crime, terrorism, banditry and kidnapping.

A day later, suspected Al-Shabaab militants abducted Mohamed Abdikadir near Modika, Garissa County. His travel companion, Fuad Ali, reported that their car was ambushed, and Abdikadir was taken while Ali was left behind. The advisory listed Garissa, Wajir, Mandera, Tana River, and parts of Malindi as high-risk areas, citing past terror attacks on government buildings, schools, places of worship, malls, and hotels.

== Attack ==
Around 5:30 a.m. (EAT) Al-Shabaab militants attacked a National Police Reservists (NPR) camp in northeastern Kenya, killing six people and injuring five. The heavily armed militants overran and ransacked the camp, prompting a security response to pursue them. They shot and stabbed officers and civilians, kidnapped people, stole weapons and commandeered a vehicle carrying mourners trying to escape the attack. Injured victims were treated at the IRC hospital, while the deceased were taken to Hagadera for burial. Two bodies of Al-Shabaab militants and six police officers were recovered while another police officer, four civilians and at least four militants were seriously injured. Other Kenyans were reported missing. The group has established bases and surveillance outposts in Fafi Sub-County. Meanwhile, the state-sponsored Ma'awisley vigilante group continues efforts to combat the Islamic terrorist group in the region.
