= Attempted assassination of Hassan Sheikh Mohamud =

2025 Al-Shabaab attempted assassination of Somalia's president

- Part of the Somali Civil War
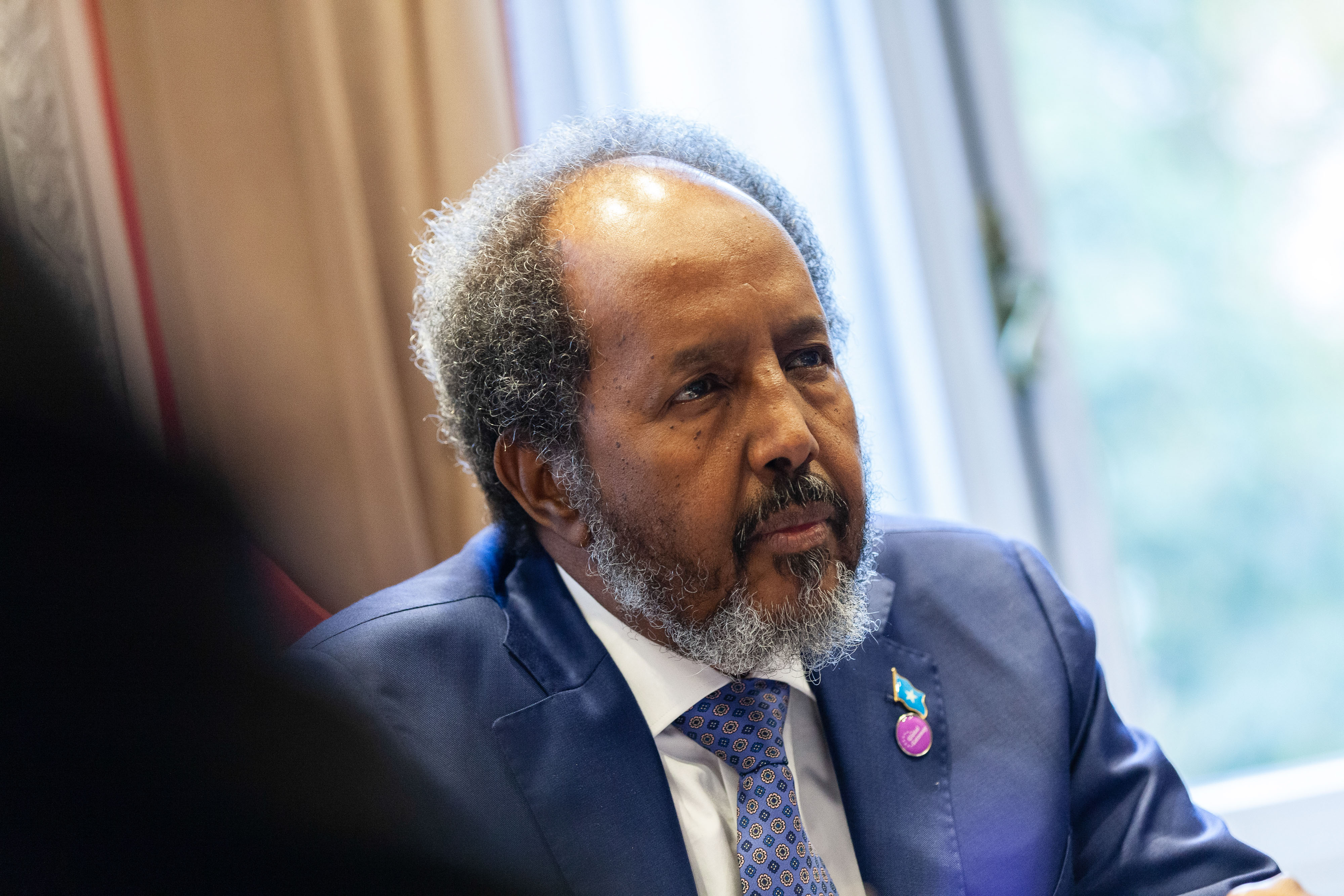
- Hassan in 2023
- Date: 18 March 2025; 17 months ago
- Time: c. 10:32 a.m. (EAT)
- Location: Hamar Jajab Neighbourhood, near Villa Somalia, Mogadishu, Somalia; 2°01′53″N 45°20′03″E
- Type: Assassination attempt
- Target: Hassan Sheikh Mohamud
- Perpetrator: Al-Shabaab
- Outcome: Failure to assassinate Hassan Sheikh
- Deaths: 10
- Injuries: 20

The attempted assassination of Hassan Sheikh Mohamud occurred on 18 March 2025, when al-Shabaab militants targeted the Somali president's convoy with a roadside bomb in Mogadishu, Somalia.

The attack took place near the Villa Somalia presidential palace as President Mohamud was en route to Aden Adde International Airport to oversee military operations against al-Shabaab in the Middle Shabelle region. The president was unharmed in the attack.

== Background ==
Al-Shabaab, an Islamist militant group and ally of al-Qaeda, has waged an insurgency for more than a decade and continues to control parts of southern and central Somalia. The group tried to assassinate him during the First HSM administration in 2012, 2013, and 2014.

=== Major offensives in southern Somalia ===
On 20 February 2025, al-Shabaab started a new offensive in Hirshabelle State called "Operation Ramadan" against the Somali National Army, African Union Mission in Somalia forces, and allied Ma'awisley clan militias (Somali: Macawiisleey). The militant group's objective was to regain territory lost in the 2022 ground offensive led by the Federal Government and African Union, particularly strategic towns and supply routes, and to take control of Somalia's capital Mogadishu.

Within the first day of the offensive, al-Shabaab took over more than 15 towns and villages in the regions of Middle Shabelle, Hiran, and Lower Shabelle. The state capital Jowhar was later surrounded by al-Shabaab fighters, and Hirshabelle president Ali Abdullahi Hussein fled the city. Opposition media compared the event to Afghan president Ashraf Ghani's escape from Kabul when it fell to the Taliban.

On 7 March 2025, the American Embassy in Mogadishu issued an alert cautioning of potential military operations by al-Shabaab, prompting several nations to cancel flights to Aden Adde International Airport. In a speech on 8 March 2025, Mohamud stated that America was disseminating "fake alerts", and such warnings were intended to destabilize his administration. Mohamud argued that these alerts undermined Somalia's sovereignty and urged the nation to focus on self-reliance rather than depending on foreign support.

=== Beledweyne hotel attack and siege ===
On 11 March 2025, six al-Shabaab attackers stormed the Cairo Hotel in Beledweyne, detonating a suicide car bomb and launching a 24-hour siege. The hotel was hosting clan elders and military officials coordinating Shabelle offensives. More than 21 people were killed, including all six attackers and two traditional elders, while dozens were injured.

== Attack ==
The bomb struck a vehicle as it passed a checkpoint near the president's at el-Gaabta intersection, a heavily fortified part of the security perimeter surrounding the presidential complex Villa Somalia in Somalia's capital, Mogadishu. President Mohamud's entourage was traveling to Aden Adde International Airport to join troops on the front lines in Hirshabelle. The bomb was planted on the roadside beneath a two-story building, causing severe damage, including to a neighboring security convoy's bulletproof vehicle.

Al-Shabaab militants claimed responsibility for the attack.

=== Victims ===
The blast killed at least 10 people, seven security personnel and three civilians, and injured 20 others. Among the victims was 31-year-old Somali Radio Risaala journalist Mohamed Abukar Dabaashe, who became the first journalist killed in Somalia in 2025. Other eyewitnesses only reported two or three deaths.

== Aftermath ==
Later, the state media SNTV published photos of him in the Adan Yabal district of Middle Shabelle region, where SNA and local forces are combating the ongoing al-Shabaab offensive.

Twenty-two journalists reporting the attack from the prominent radio station Risaala Media, which was briefly shutdown by the government, were detained by police.

On 19 March 2025, al-Shabaab launched multiple mortar attacks targeting Aden Adde International Airport and the Halane compound where several foreign entities, including the United Nations headquarters were located. In response to the attacks, the Somali National Army and the National Intelligence and Security Agency killed more than 6 al-Shabaab leaders during an assault operation in Lower Shabelle.

== Reactions ==
Presidential adviser Zakariye Hussein wrote in a post on X that Hassan was "good and well on his way to the front lines." The Ministry of Information of Somalia released a statement calling the attack a "cowardly act of desperation".

Former presidents Sharif Sheikh Ahmed and Mohamed Abdullahi Mohamed, former prime minister Abdi Farah Shirdon, MP Abdullahi Hashi Abib and Puntland minister of interior Abdi Farah Said Juha condemned the attack.

The Somali Journalists Syndicate (SJS) condemned the attempted killing, calling it a "cowardly attack" and extending condolences to Dabaashe's family and the broader media community.

Several different countries and organizations offered condolences and condemnation of the attack, including Algeria, Egypt, Jordan, Kuwait, Mauritania, Palestine, Qatar Saudi Arabia, Ukraine, the United Arab Emirates, the United Kingdom, and the United States.

Newly-elected Chairperson of the African Union Commission and Djiboutian foreign minister Mahamoud Ali Youssouf condemned the attack as did the Arab League, OIC secretary-general Hissein Brahim Taha and UN secretary-general António Guterres.
