= 2025 Ramot Junction shooting =

Mass shooting in Jerusalem

- Part of the Israeli–Palestinian conflict
- The location of the attack in Jerusalem.
- Native name: פיגוע הירי בצומת רמות
- Location: 31°48′32″N 35°12′15″E; Ramot Junction
- Date: 8 September 2025 c. 10:13 a.m. (IDT)
- Target: Israelis
- Attack type: Mass shooting
- Weapon: Carlo submachine guns
- Deaths: 8 (including both perpetrators)
- Injuries: 21
- Perpetrator: Hamas (claimed responsibility)
- No. of participants: 2
- Motive: Under investigation

On 8 September 2025, two Palestinian militants boarded a bus at the Ramot Junction in Jerusalem and opened fire killing six people and injuring 21. This junction is one of the busiest ones in the city.

The 6 victims were Levi Yitzhak Pash, aged 57, Yisrael Matzner, aged 28, Rabbi Yosef David, aged 43, Rabbi Mordechai Steintzeg, aged 79, Sarah Mendelson, aged 60, and Yaakov Pinto, a Spanish national, aged 25.

The attackers were shot and killed by an armed civilian and an off-duty soldier who responded immediately at the scene.

== Attack ==
Two gunmen arrived by vehicle to near the 62 bus line stop near Ramot Junction on Yigal Street. One of them was reportedly dressed as a ticket inspector. According to eyewitnesses, when the bus pulled into the stop, the doors did not initially open. The driver claimed that they had malfunctioned. When the doors opened, the militants immediately began shooting. Another witness described the shooting as happening immediately after the bus arrived at the stop. According to emergency services, the shooting began at approximately 10:13 IST, when reports of gunfire were received by Magen David Adom (MDA). Witnesses described gunfire directed at a bus and nearby people.

The attackers used an improvised "Carlo" submachine gun, a makeshift firearm commonly produced in Palestinian workshops in the West Bank that has been employed in a number of previous terror attacks. The attackers were killed by an officer from the IDF's Hashmonaim Brigade and by an ultra-Orthodox civilian armed with a licensed private handgun.

MDA paramedics reported finding several people unconscious on the ground near the bus stop, surrounded by shattered glass and debris. Paramedics provided treatment on site before evacuating the wounded to hospitals in Jerusalem.

The Israel Police announced that after both perpetrators had been "neutralized", major access roads to the junction were closed. Large police and security forces were deployed under the command of the district commander.

In response to the attack, Israel demolished homes in Qatanna and al-Qubeiba, the hometowns of the two attackers. It also cancelled work visas for 750 Palestinians from those areas, and sanctioned the families of the attackers. Bezalel Smotrich said that the assailants' villages should "become like Rafah and Beit Hanoun."

== Victims ==
Authorities reported that eight people were killed, including one person who died at Shaare Zedek Medical Center and the two perpetrators. The victims were reportedly identified as Levi Yitzhak Pash, 57, Yisrael Matzner, 28, Rabbi Yosef David, 43, Rabbi Mordechai Steintzeg, 79, Yaakov Pinto (a Spanish national), 25 and Sarah Mendelson, 60. The Shaare Zedek Medical Center opened a mental health emergency room following the attack. At least 26 people were treated at the scene for anxiety. At least 21 others were injured, including 10 people transported to Shaare Zedek, Hadassah–Ein Kerem, and Hadassah–Mount Scopus.

== Assailants ==
Hamas's al-Qassam Brigades claimed responsibility for the attack. The perpetrators were identified as Palestinians from the West Bank, reportedly originating from the towns of al-Qubeiba and Qatanna, situated near Ramallah and in proximity to the site of the attack. Arabic sources identified the perpetrators as Mohamed Bassam Taha and Muthanna Naji Amru.

A suspected accomplice was later arrested by the Shin Bet in East Jerusalem.

== Reactions ==
=== Domestic ===
Israeli prime minister Benjamin Netanyahu sent condolences to the families of the victims, and described the attack as part of the "intense war [that Israeli is fighting] on several fronts." Other Israeli ministers took this incident as proof that a "peaceful" Palestinian state is not at hand, and called on the international community not to recognize a Palestinian state. Israeli president Isaac Herzog called the attackers "vile and evil terrorists" while memorializing the victims and praising those that prevented even more victims.

The president of Palestine, Mahmoud Abbas, indirectly condemned the attack, saying that he continues to be "rejecting and condemning any harm to Palestinian and Israeli civilians, and rejects all forms of violence, regardless of their source."

Hamas praised the attackers, describing it as a "heroic operation." In a statement, the group called it "a natural response to the occupation's crimes and war of extermination" and urged West Bank Palestinians to "escalate the confrontation with the occupation and its settlers." Palestinian Islamic Jihad also praised the attack saying "a natural and legitimate response to the ongoing crimes of the Zionist enemy". Hamas later accepted responsibility for the shooting.

=== International ===
The foreign ministry of Argentina "energetically" condemned the attack, expressing condolences to the families of the victims, especially to the family of Sara Mendelson, who was an Argentine citizen by birth. The ministry further labelled the attack as "antisemitic" and conveyed the country's support for Israel in the fight against terrorism.

The United Arab Emirates condemned "in the strongest terms" what it called a "terrorist shooting incident" and expressed its condolences to the families of the victims and the state of Israel and its people.

The United States Department of State said that it was "closely monitoring the situation in Jerusalem following this morning's cruel terror attack at the Ramot Junction" and that it "condemns terrorism and stands alongside our friend Israel."

A European Union spokesperson condemned the attack, saying, "We condemn all loss of lives" as well as calling for de-escalation and a ceasefire.

French president Emmanuel Macron, British foreign secretary Yvette Cooper, and German foreign minister Johann Wadephul condemned the attack.

== Aftermath ==
On 9 September 2025, the day after the attack, Israel launched an airstrike on Doha, the capital of Qatar, with the aim of killing senior Hamas officials as retaliation. The Israeli strike killed 6 people, including a member of the Qatari security forces, but failed to kill any of its intended targets.

== See also ==
- Palestinian political violence
- 2023 Neve Yaakov shooting
- 2023 Ramot attack
- 2025 al-Funduq shooting
- 2025 northern Israel stabbing and ramming attack
