= 2025 Jaalle Siyaad military academy bombing =

2025 Al-Shabaab attacked Jaalle Siad Military Academy

- Part of the Somali Civil War
- Location: Jaalle Siyaad military academy, Hodan, Mogadishu, Somalia
- Date: 9 July 2025 c.11:20 a.m. (EAT)
- Target: Jaalle Siyaad military academy
- Attack type: Suicide bombing, gunfire
- Weapons: Suicide vest, firearms
- Deaths: ≥5 (including the perpetrator)
- Injuries: Several
- Perpetrator: Al-Shabaab
- No. of participants: ≥1

On 9 July 2025, at least one al-Shabaab suicide attacker attacked the 14th October Brigade of the Somali Armed Forces at the Jaalle Siad Military Academy in Hodan District of Mogadishu, Somalia. The attack killed at least five people, four Somali military officials and the perpetrator, and injured several others.

== Attack ==
Four senior officers of the Somali National Army were killed in a suicide bombing followed by gunfire that took place on Jaalle Siyaad Military Academy in Mogadishu, the headquarters of the Ground Forces Command. Among the killed officers were military officials involved in attendance and roll-call duties. The unit attacked, the 14th October Brigade, was established after the 14 October 2017 Mogadishu bombings, which killed over 600 and became the deadliest terrorist attack in Africa on record.

International partners assisting the federal government in rebuilding its national army were present at the academy during the attack.

The ministry of defence restricted the release of information regarding the incident. Six senior SNA officers, including those responsible for security, were detained for questioning about how the attacker managed to infiltrate the heavily fortified facility. This followed heightened security measures implemented after a previous attack on the brigade.
