= 2015 Gush Etzion Junction attack =

Terrorist incident in the West Bank

2015 Gush Etzion Junction shooting
- Native name: הפיגוע בכניסה לאלון שבות
- Location: Gush Etzion Junction
- Date: 19 November 2015; 10 years ago
- Target: Civilians
- Attack type: Shooting
- Weapon: Uzi submachine gun
- Deaths: 3 civilians
- Injuries: 5
- Assailant: Mohammed Abdel Basset al-Kharoub
- Defender: Yuval Lasri

On 19 November 2015, a Palestinian gunman opened fire on a line of traffic near Alon Shvut in the West Bank and continued to fire as he drove the car towards Gush Etzion Junction where he lost control of the vehicle, which then crashed into another vehicle. As a result, 3 civilians were killed and 5 were wounded.

The attack took place during the 2015–2016 wave of violence in Israeli-Palestinian conflict.

== Attack ==
The attack took place at around 4:35 pm. The gunman fired an Uzi submachine gun at cars stuck in traffic, and, when his car crashed, stepped out of the vehicle to continue shooting. The attacker was immobilized by a driver, Yuval Lasri, who told reporters that, "I didn’t shoot at him because I wasn’t sure that he was the terrorist, but then I saw the gun next to him and understood that he was.”

== Context ==
This attack shocked the nation coming, as it did, after a period of calm, free of terror attacks. Together with the stabbing at a synagogue in Tel Aviv that occurred only a few hours earlier, it was, "the bloodiest day in Israel since this latest round of Palestinian violence began back in September."

== Victims ==
- Ezra Schwartz (18), an American from Sharon, Massachusetts who was studying abroad. He had recently accepted admission into the Rutgers Business School and was taking a gap year in Israel. Rutgers University President, Robert L. Barchi, lowered the flags to half-staff on Monday, November 23. Schwartz was on his way to a park along with friends with whom he had been constructing, as a volunteer, a memorial park in honor of three Israeli boys who were kidnapped and murdered by Hamas in 2014. A false rumor that many news reports have echoed claimed that he planned to give food to soldiers. He has been buried in the Sharon Memorial Park.
- Shadi Arafeh (Arafa) (24), a Palestinian Arab from Hebron. A Palestinian Authority spokesman falsely claimed that Arafa, who was killed by the Palestinian terrorist, had been shot by Israeli security. Official Palestinian sources alleged that Arafa was slain by Israeli soldiers, despite the fact that the only shots fired during the incident where those fired by the Palestinian terrorist who shot at passenger cars, killing Arafa and 2 Jewish civilians.
- Yaakov Don (51), teacher, father of four from Alon Shvut. Don was taken to Hadassah Medical Center, where he died within hours of the attack.

Two Israeli women, one injured in the car crash, the other by gunfire, were taken to Shaare Zedek Medical Center.

== Perpetrator ==
The shooter was Mohammed Abdel Basset al-Kharoub (24), from Dir Smat near Hebron. He had procured over $10,000 in guns and ammunition and had been training for the attack for several months, assisted by several adults. He committed the murders to celebrate his birthday, the day of the attack. His mother later told reporters that she was proud of her son.

== Impact ==
Security measures in response to these murders include a temporary order to stop and search all Palestinian vehicles nearing the intersection, revocation of legal permits to work in Israel held by the extended family of the terrorist, and the planning of bypass roads to separate Israeli vehicles from Palestinian vehicles at this spot.

== Response ==
- The government of the United States regards the shooting as a terrorist attack.

== See also ==
- 2015 synagogue stabbing
