= 2025 Bat Yam bus bombings =

Bus bombing in Gush Dan, February 2025

- Location: Bat Yam, Israel
- Date: 20 February 2025; 20 months ago
- Attack type: Bus bombing
- Deaths: 0
- Injuries: 0

On 20 February 2025, three buses exploded from onboard bombs in the city of Bat Yam, Israel. Two other buses in nearby Holon were found with identical bombs and failed to explode. No people were injured in the attacks.

Following the explosions, all bus, train, and light rail transport in Israel was paused by order of the Transport Minister, Miri Regev. It was reported that one of the devices had the message "Revenge from Tulkarem" displayed on it. The message was a reference to an Israeli raid that had been carried out in the West Bank. Hamas and its Tulkarm Brigade denied responsibility or involvement in the attack.

== Bombings ==
The buses were parked in separate stations approximately 500 metres (1,600 ft) away from each other. The first two explosions occurred within minutes of each other, while the third happened 15 minutes later. The first bombing took place near the Bat Yam Municipal Stadium. It was reported by a security guard at 8:30 p.m. UTC+02:00. A second explosion occurred nearby, and a third took place near the Wolfson Medical Center in Holon. Three buses were destroyed in the explosions. One bus was evacuated after a passenger noticed a suspicious object, and exploded shortly after. Two other explosives that were found on buses in Bat Yam and Holon were taken to be defused by bomb squads. No passengers were aboard any of the targeted buses at the time of the explosions, which had been parked at bus depots after completing their routes.

All five bombs were identical and attached to timers. According to Tel Aviv Police District commander Haim Sargaoff, they weighed between four and five kilograms and were intended to detonate in the morning of 21 February, possibly killing hundreds. Israeli newspaper Maariv reported that the bombs were composed of non-explosive materials such as fertilizer and urea, and were intended to detonate at around 9:00 or 10:00 a.m., but were set up incorrectly.

== Responsibility ==
Israel's Police Spokesperson's Unit said that the bombs used in the attack resembled those seen in the West Bank. Following the bombings, Hamas's Tulkarm Battalion released a statement that read: "The revenge of the martyrs will not be forgotten so long as the occupier is present on our land... This is a jihad of either victory or martyrdom," without explicitly claiming the attack. The group eventually denied responsibility. A preliminary Israeli investigation found that the attack was conducted by Hamas from the West Bank with Iranian planning and funding. The Shin Bet arrested three suspects the following day, including two Jewish Israelis who were suspected of transporting the bombers.

== Aftermath ==
Israeli Prime Minister Benjamin Netanyahu ordered the Israel Defense Forces to conduct a major operation against militant sites in the West Bank. He also called for the Israel Police and Shin Bet to increase security measures against further attacks in Israeli cities.

The IDF increased activities in the Seam Zone, blocked specific checkpoints leading to the West Bank, and announced that it would deploy three battalions to the West Bank following the bombings.

== See also ==
- 2013 Bat Yam bus bombing
