= Villa Somalia =

Somalia's presidential residence and office

- Interactive map of the Villa Somalia area

General information
- Location: Mogadishu, Somalia
- Coordinates: 2.0408°N 45.3353°E
- Current tenants: Hassan Sheikh Mohamud, President of Somalia and the First Family
- Construction started: October 1, 1922; 103 years ago
- Completed: October 1, 1936; 89 years ago

Website
- villasomalia.gov.so

Villa Somalia (Somali: Madaxtooyada Soomaaliya, Arabic: فيلا الصومال) in Mogadishu, is the official palace and principal workplace of the president of Somalia. The current occupant is president Hassan Sheikh Mohamud of the Federal Government of Somalia (FGS).

== History ==
The edifice was built in the Art Deco style by the colonial authorities in Italian Somaliland, serving as a residence for the Governors.

Villa Somalia (originally called Villa del Viceré when inaugurated in October 1936) was on high ground that overlooked Italian Mogadishu on the Indian Ocean, with access to both the harbour and Petrella airport. It was originally a large, squarish stucco building with a tiled roof.

The edifice was built in the new section of the city (developed by the Italians in the late 1930s) and it was a famous symbol of modernist (art deco) architecture.

The story of Mogadishu’s Modernist buildings begins during the time of Italian colonial rule. Unlike Asmara in Eritrea and Tripoli in Libya, where the Italians built their colonial city alongside the native walled town, in Mogadishu the walls of the old medina were torn down and the occupiers’ buildings imposed in the city centre.....Another prominent building of the period is Villa Somalia, an Art Deco palace which served as the residence of the Italian governor.....it is still in good condition today, thanks to the fact that it remained the seat of whoever was internationally recognised as the leader of Somalia, with all the security that entailed.

— Rakesh Ramchum

Following independence in 1960, the building became the presidential palace of the president of the Somali Republic. After the start of the civil war and the overthrow of the Siad Barre administration in the early 1990s, various factions fought for control of and installed themselves in the residence. During the last stand of the regime in January 1991, the Villa was a final stronghold held by the security services in the capital. Mortars were fired from the palace into the city to attack insurgents - in particular Towfiq neighborhood where rebels had set up command posts.

During the early 2000's, Villa Somalia was under the control of the powerful Mogadishu warlord Hussein Farah Aidid of the Somali National Alliance (SNA) and Somalia Reconciliation and Restoration Council (SRRC). Aidid and the SRRC were opposed to the newly formed Transitional National Government (TNG) and used the Villa as a base to attack the TNG and forces loyal to it. Following a dispute between Aidids forces during June 2003, a heavy weapon was discharged on the Villa's grounds resulting in one of the largest explosions in the capital since 1991. In his role as Minister of the Interior of the Transitional Federal Government (TFG), Aidid made a public visit to the Villa in August 2005.

During summer of 2006 when the Islamic Courts Union (ICU) defeated the Somali Warlord Alliance, the Villa remained one of the last warlord holdouts in Mogadishu, then under the control of clan militia loyal to Hussein Aidid. Villa Somalia served as the headquarters of the ICU after it was seized from warlord control. In January 2007, following the start of the Ethiopian invasion and the fall of Mogadishu, which ended the Islamic Courts administration, Transitional Federal Government (TFG) president Abdullahi Yusuf arrived at Mogadishu airport and was escorted by Ethiopian troops to Villa Somalia. The TFG subsequently relocated its seat of government from Baidoa to Mogadishu. Soon after, the Ethiopian embassy was established within the Villa Somalia compound. Ethiopian National Defense Force (ENDF) Colonel Gabre Heard, who presided over military affairs in Somalia during the military occupation, directed his operations from Villa Somalia, which at the time also functioned as a makeshift ENDF base against insurgent groups.

Today, it is the office of President Hassan Sheikh Mohamud. It underwent comprehensive renovation and reconstruction under Mohamud, along with the addition of several buildings, and was reopened on October 1, 2025.

== Chief of Staff ==
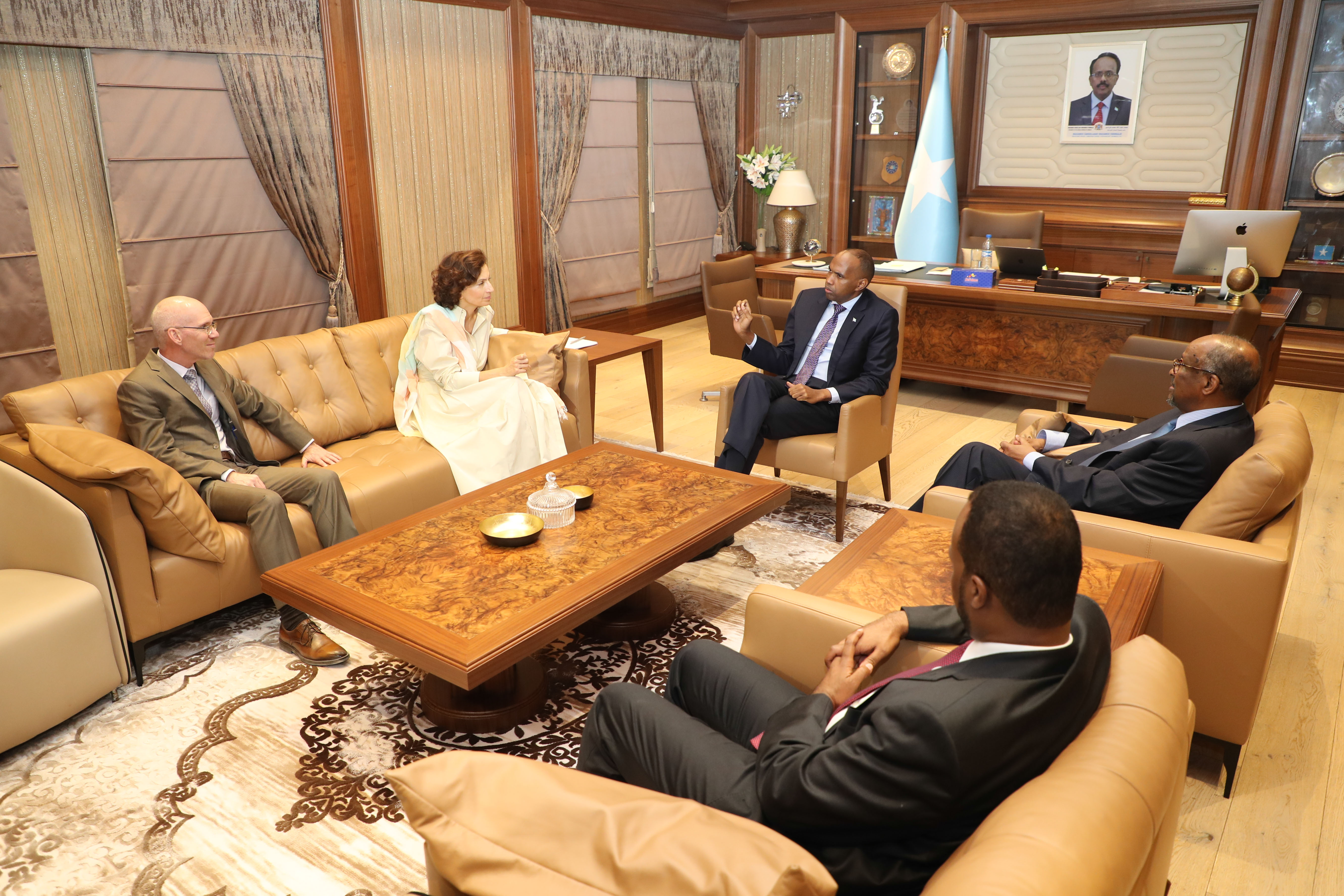
UNESCO Director-General Audrey Azoulay (second from left) and the UN Envoy to Somalia, James Swan (left), meet Somalia's former Prime Minister Hassan Ali Khaire at his office in Villa Somalia, in Mogadishu, on 11 February 2020

Mohamed Abdullahi Mohamed appointed Fahad Yasin to the position of Chief of Staff for Villa Somalia in April 2017.

On 8 September 2021 Mohamed Abdullahi Mohamed appointed Abdisaid Muse Ali as Chief of Staff for Villa Somalia, previously he was National Security Advisor to the President.

In June 2022 President Hassan Sheikh Mohamud announced the appointment of Hussein Sheikh Mohamud as the new Chief of Staff Villa Somalia. He made this important appointment after one month of assuming the office of President.

In August 2023 President Hassan Sheikh Mohamud officially announced the appointment of Abdihakim Mohamed Yusuf as the new Chief of Staff Villa Somalia; for the Office of the President.

Hussein Sheikh Mohamud, the prior chief of staff, resigned in May but only made his departure public this week.

== See also ==
- Governor's Palace of Mogadishu
