= 2025 al-Funduq shooting =

2025 attack in the West Bank

2025 Al-Funduq shooting
- Part of the Israeli incursions in the West Bank during the Gaza war
- Location: Al-Funduq, Israeli-occupied West Bank
- Date: 6 January 2025
- Target: Israelis
- Attack type: Mass shooting, terrorist attack
- Weapon: AK-style assault rifles
- Deaths: 3
- Injuries: 8
- Perpetrators: Hamas and PIJ: Al-Qassam Brigades members and a Al-Quds Brigades member in the Jenin Brigades
- No. of participants: 3

On 6 January 2025, three Palestinian gunmen carried out a shooting attack on a bus and two cars in al-Funduq, northern West Bank, killing three people and injuring eight others.

== Background ==
The attack is part of the fighting between Israeli forces and Palestinian militants throughout the West Bank, which has escalated since the start of the Gaza war.

At the time of the attack, the Jenin Brigades, the umbrella militant formation to which the gunmen belonged, was under attack by the Palestinian Authority (PA). The attack was meant to be a message to the PA– that their siege could not stifle militant reprisals against the Israeli occupation.

== Attack ==
Mohammed Zakarneh (a member of Palestinian Islamic Jihad), Qutaiba al-Shalabi, and Mohammed Nazal (members of Hamas) got out of a white sedan armed with assault rifles and opened fire at close range on a bus and two cars traveling along Highway 55 in Al-Funduq. Three people were killed and eight others were injured, including at least one seriously.

The attackers fled the scene after an armed civilian fired at them with a handgun. The Israel Defense Forces launched a manhunt to locate them using increased security and road blocks.

== Victims ==
The victims were identified as 35-year-old police officer Elad Yaakov Winkelstein, 73-year-old Aliza Rais and 70-year-old Rachel Cohen. Out of the eight injured people, the 63-year-old bus driver was transported to a hospital in serious condition.

== Perpetrators ==
The three Palestinian gunmen were from the Jenin area in the northern West Bank. Hamas's Al-Qassam Brigades claimed responsibility for the attack two days later.

== Aftermath ==
In response to the attack, Israeli Prime Minister Benjamin Netanyahu's office said that he approved operations for capturing attackers and a series of additional defensive and offensive operations in West Bank. Following the attack, multiple reports emerged of Israeli settler retaliatory attacks against Palestinians in parts of the occupied West Bank.

Qutaiba al-Shalabi and Mohammed Nazal were killed by Israeli forces near Jenin on 22 January. On 16 April 2025, Mohammed Zakarneh was killed.
