= 2025 Beledweyne hotel attack =

2025 hotel attack in Beledweyne, Somalia

- Part of 2025 Shabelle offensive during the Somali Civil War
- Location: 4°44′05″N 45°11′50″E; Beledweyne, Hiiraan, Somalia
- Date: 07:00, March 11, 2025 – March 12, 2025 (EAT)
- Target: Hotel Cairo
- Attack type: Suicide bombing; car bombing; mass shooting
- Weapons: Car bomb, suicide vests, firearms
- Deaths: 21+ (including 6 attackers)
- Injuries: 5+
- Perpetrator: Al Shabaab
- No. of participants: 6

On 11 March 2025, six al-Shabaab militants detonated a suicide car bomb at the Cairo Hotel in central Beledweyne, Hiran, Somalia. The assault began with an explosion, followed by intense gunfire as attackers stormed the hotel and clashed with security forces. More than 21 people were killed, including all attackers and two traditional elders, and dozens were injured. The death toll is expected to rise due to the severity of the incident. The hotel hosted traditional elders and military officers coordinating government reports.

== Background ==
Al-Shabaab, a Jihadist militant group and ally of al-Qaeda, has waged an insurgency for over a decade and continues to control parts of southern and central Somalia.

The Cairo Hotel is a prominent location in the city of Beledweyne that serves as a base for traditional elders and military officers who play a vital role in coordinating government offensives against al-Shabaab militants.

=== South and central Somalia offensives ===
On 20 February 2025, al-Shabaab started a new offensive called "Operation Ramadan", against the Somali National Army (SNA), African Union Stabilization Mission in Somalia (AUSSOM) forces, and allied Ma'awisley clan militias (Somali: Macawiisleey), in Hirshabelle State. The militant group's objective was to regain territory lost in the 2022 ground offensive led by the federal government and African Union, particularly strategic towns and supply routes, and to take control of Somalia's capital Mogadishu.

Al-Shabaab took over more than 15 towns and villages in the Middle Shabelle, Hiran, and Lower Shabelle regions within the first day of the offensive. The state capital Jowhar was later surrounded by al-Shabaab fighters, and Hirshabelle's president Ali Guudlaawe fled the city. Opposition media compared the event to Afghan president Ashraf Ghani's escape from Kabul when it fell to the Taliban.

On 4 March 2025, the U.S. Embassy in Mogadishu warned of imminent attack threats from al-Shabaab in Mogadishu, including at Aden Adde International Airport. Following this security warning, Turkish Airlines and Qatar Airways halted all flights to Mogadishu. Embassy personnel movements were suspended. The embassy also warned that militant groups continue to plan kidnappings, bombings, and other attacks across the country.

== Attack ==
On 11 March 2025, at around 7:00 a.m. (EAT), six militants from al-Shabaab launched an attack against the Cairo Hotel, where politicians, security officials and traditional elders were meeting to discuss plans for an offensive against al-Shabaab in southern central Somalia.

The attack began with the detonation of a car bomb, followed by gunmen storming the hotel. At least five people were initially killed and five others were injured. The death toll later increased to more than 15 civilians. According to al-Shabaab, 20 people were killed, including government officials and leaders of a pro-government clan militia.

Somali security forces, supported by Djiboutian and Ethiopian troops under the African Union Support and Stabilization Mission in Somalia, later surrounded the hotel. Later reports confirmed fifteen civilian deaths, with the toll expected to increase. After 24 hours, all six al-Shabaab attackers were killed. The hotel was significantly damaged by smoke and flames during the attack.

== Aftermath ==
In response to the attack, the Somali Army killed at least 50 al-Shabaab militants in airstrikes, including the senior leader in charge of the coordination of the group's combat vehicles, Mansoor Tima-Weeyne.

== Reactions ==
Former presidents Sharif Sheikh Ahmed and Mohamed Abdullahi Mohamed condemned the attacks on social media and expressed condolences to relatives of the victims, as did the minister of health, Ali Haji Adam.

Alper Aktaş, Turkish Ambassador to Somalia, expressed his sympathy and solidarity with victims.

More than 100 members of Somalia's Federal Parliament called on President Hassan Sheikh Mohamud to resign, accusing him of leadership failures as the country grapples with mounting security and governance challenges.
