= Hodan, Mogadishu =

Coordinates: 2.0436°N 45.3039°E

Hodan
- Neighbourhood
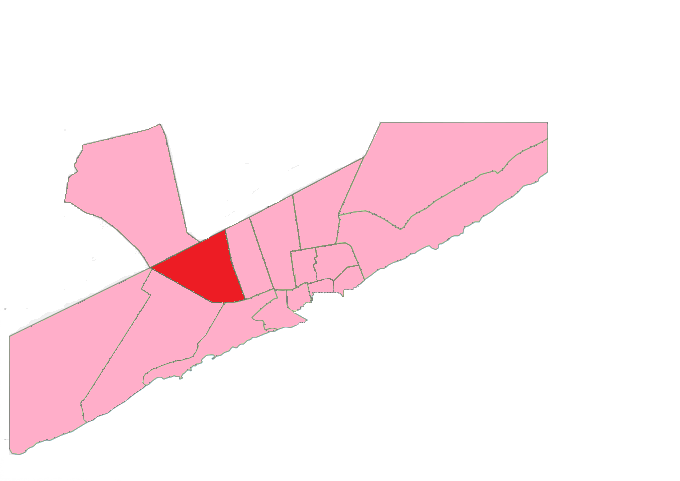
- Country: Somalia
- Region: Banaadir
- City: Mogadishu
- Time zone: UTC+3 (EAT)

Hodan Neighbourhood (Somali: Hodan ee Muqdisho, Arabic: حي هودن, romanized: Hay Hudun) is a neighbourhood in the southeastern Banaadir region of Somalia. It is a neighbourhood in the northwestern part of Mogadishu.

== Region ==
This neighbourhood as well as the bordering Deyniile neighbourhood are a part of the traditional Territory of the Murusade clan. The Hodan neighbourhood has a sub-neighbourhood called Taleh, that includes a taleh road and Taleh square; it was named after the city Taleh in modern Waqooyi Bari, that was formerly the capital of the Dervish State.

== Important ==
Hodan District is one of the most important districts in the Banadir region and hosts numerous businesses, including the southern section of Bakaara Market; the district is also home to Dahab Tower, the tallest building in Mogadishu.

== See also ==
- Abdiaziz, Mogadishu
