= African Union Support and Stabilization Mission in Somalia =

Peacekeeping operation since 2025

- Hawlgalka Taageerada iyo Xasilinta Midowga Afrika ee Soomaaliya
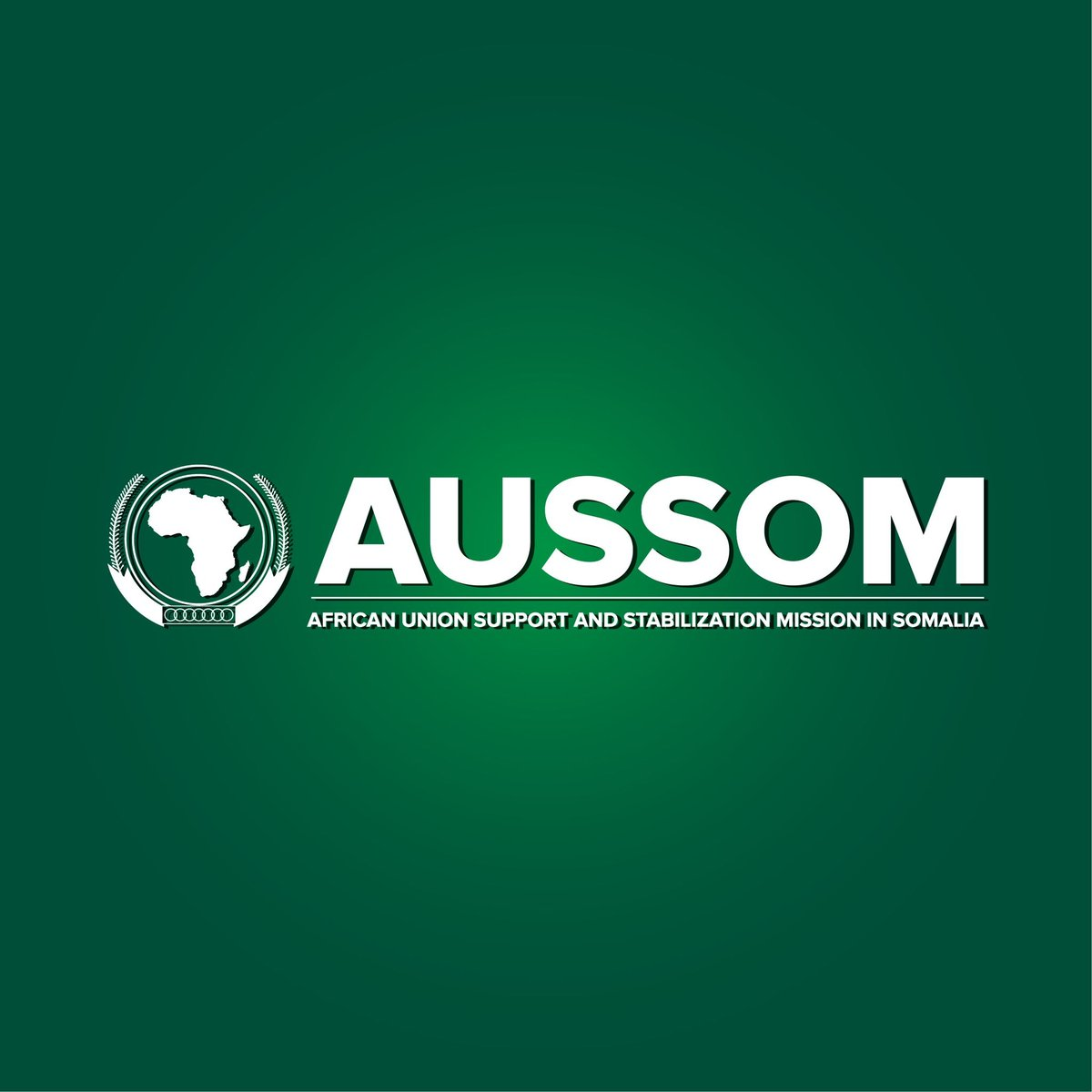
- Leader: Head of AUSSOM Ambassador Mohamed El-Amine Souef
- Dates active: 1 January 2025 – present
- Headquarters: Mogadishu
- Active regions: Central and southern Somalia
- Wars: Somali Civil War: Somali Civil War (2009–present)
- Website: au-ssom.org

The African Union Support and Stabilization Mission in Somalia (AUSSOM) is a peacekeeping operation which started in 2025 authorized by the African Union (AU) to replace the African Union Transition Mission in Somalia (ATMIS). The mission aims to support Somali security forces in stabilizing the country and combating Al-Shabaab, while facilitating a gradual handover of security responsibilities to the Somali government.

AUSSOM’s formation has been shaped by financial constraints and, political tensions, particularly concerning Ethiopia’s role. The mission is to consist of 11,900 personnel, including military, police, and civilian staff, contributed by Uganda, Ethiopia, Djibouti, Kenya, and Egypt. Concerns over human rights violations committed by the previous AU operations, including extrajudicial killings and sexual violence, have raised scrutiny over troop selection and oversight. AUSSOM has been criticized for the legal immunity AU personnel operate under, which has hindered accountability for crimes and abuses.

== Overview ==
=== AMISOM and ATMIS ===
In March 2007, the African Union Mission to Somalia (AMISOM) was deployed following an Ethiopian invasion aimed at toppling a nascent Islamic government and installing the Transitional Federal Government (TFG). The goal of the AU operation was to aid the Ethiopians in propping up TFG and while offering Ethiopian troops an exit strategy as their presence was inflaming a growing insurgency, which the militant group Al-Shabaab was becoming a major part of. 15 years after its deployment AMISOM shifted to the African Union Transition Mission in Somalia (ATMIS), with the goal of handing over complete security responsibility over to Somali government forces.

The African Union's Peace and Security Council approved the creation of AUSSOM on 1st August, 2024, with plans to start the mission in 2025, after ATMIS’ withdrawal on 31 December, 2024. Somali President Hassan Sheikh Mohamud has actively sought to rally support from former ATMIS contributors, encouraging them to participate in AUSSOM.

Public support, a crucial factor in counterinsurgency efforts against Al-Shabaab, has been undermined by the conduct of AU forces. According to Jethro Norman, a researcher at the Danish Institute for International Studies, abuses and war crimes committed by AU troops in Somalia "have fostered deep-seated resentment among much of the Somali population... A perceived lack of accountability has only worsened this distrust – reinforcing the belief that AU troops can act with impunity." Al-Shabaab has exploited widespread Somali anger over the impunity and misconduct of AU forces, using it to bolster recruitment and justify attacks.

=== Ethiopian–Somali conflict ===
Financial constraints and rising tensions between Somalia and Ethiopia following the signing of Ethiopia's Memorandum of Understanding with Somaliland will possibly delay the transition. The international community has been divided on financial support for the missions new structure.

On 27 December 2024, soon thereafter, the United Nations Security Council approves the Resolution 2767 deployment of this mission effective on 1 January 2025, replacing the current African Union Transition Mission in Somalia. It is currently unclear if Ethiopia will be allowed to participate in the operation, as Ethiopian troops were excluded from the new AUSSOM initiative due to repeated incidents in which their forces allegedly violated Somalia’s sovereignty. As of 2 January 2025, Somalia is considering reversing the decision to exclude the Ethiopian National Defense Force (ENDF) from AUSSOM. That same day the Ethiopian Minister of Defense traveled to Mogadishu for discussions on the AU mission. Somalia's Minister of State for Foreign Affairs, Ali Balcad, stated in an interview with Bloomberg News, “Given that the contentious issues between Somalia and Ethiopia have been resolved through the Ankara Declaration, Somalia is ready to reconsider the inclusion of the Ethiopian National Defense Force in the upcoming AUSSOM mission,”

=== African Unions troop allocation ===
On 25 February 2025, Somali federal government and the African Union have finalized the troop distribution for the new mission and resolving prior disputes between Ethiopian and Somalia and later Burundi and Somalia. The mission will deploy 11,900 personnel, including soldiers, police, and civilian staff. Under the agreement, Uganda will contribute 4,500 troops, followed by Ethiopia with 2,500, Djibouti with 1,520, Kenya with 1,410, and Egypt with 1,091.

=== Egyptian deployment to Somalia (2026) ===
In early 2026, Egypt deployed military personnel and equipment to Somalia as part of its contribution to AUSSOM. The deployment includes troops, attack and utility helicopters, and light fixed‑wing aircraft, and was coordinated with Somali authorities and the African Union Peace and Security Council.

== Responses ==
=== Former ATMIS/AMISOM members ===
- Ethiopia: Ethiopia expressed interest in joining the new mission despite Somalia's initial rejection due to Ethiopia's Memorandum of Understanding with Somaliland. Somalia's Ministry of Foreign Affairs criticized Ethiopia, citing increased Al-Shabaab activity linked to its presence. On 11 December 2024, with Turkey's mediation, Ethiopia and Somalia reached an agreement to ease tensions. During a press conference Somali President Hassan Sheikh praised Ethiopian contributions to AU operations in Somalia and stated "we will keep continue on that". Senior Somali government officials stated to journalists that the government was “ready to reconsider” Ethiopian involvement in AUSSOM following the Ankara dialogue. However, days later, Somalia accused Ethiopian troops of attacks on Somali army, police and intelligence bases which resulted in fatalities. This has left Ethiopia's participation in the mission uncertain. At a UN Security Council meeting on 27 December, the Somali government effectively barred Ethiopian participation by stating that its existing security agreements were sufficient, but the governments National Security Advisor later suggested a decision had still not been reached. Other Somali officials insist no final decision has been made regarding Ethiopia forces. Some observers believe Somalia is using AUSSOM as a bargaining chip until Ethiopia explicitly cancels the MoU with Somaliland.
- Djibouti: Djibouti has also offered to send peacekeeping troops to AUSSOM; this was welcomed by Somalia.
- Uganda: Uganda's foreign minister Henry Oryem Okello has opposed Egypt's troop deployment, saying that they might dominate AUSSOM. After that, Somali president Hassan Sheikh Mohamud went to Uganda to speak with Ugandan president Yoweri Kaguta Museveni, to persuade Uganda into supporting Egypt's help in the mission.
- Kenya: Kenya's president William Ruto met with Somali president Hassan Sheikh Mohamud to discuss AUSSOM, that ended with Kenya endorsing the new mission.
- Burundi: Burundi, another former ATMIS contributor, has also seen a visit from the Somali president that ended with the country's president Évariste Ndayishimiye welcoming the mission. Burundi later confirmed it would not be taking part in the operation due to a “lack of consensus” between Burundi and Somalia on the number of troops it can deploy for AUSSOM. Burundi officials claimed they had been disrespected by the Somali governments allocation of low troop numbers to the country, which they assert will leave Burundian forces open to attack.

=== Other States ===
- Egypt: Egypt has offered to send 10,000 troops to Somalia, 5,000 for AUSSOM and another 5,000 that will work independently in Somalia's Hiiraan region bordering Ethiopia. In response to Ethiopia's attempts to establish a naval base and recognize Somaliland, Somalia has increasingly turned to Egypt. In August 2024, the Somali government announced that in January 2025, the Egyptian Armed Forces would replace the Ethiopian troops deployed under ATMIS. Egyptian officials stated that they would send weapons including armored vehicles, artillery, radars, and drones to Somalia as part of the defense deal.
- The United States: The United States is also optimistic about the transition into AUSSOM from ATMIS.
- The United Kingdom: The UK submitted a draft resolution to the United Nations, welcoming the AU’s decision to create AUSSOM. After that, British UN Representative James Kariuki welcomed the creation of AUSSOM at the UN Security Council.
- France: France at the United Nations also welcomed AUSSOM’s creation.

== See also ==
- List of non-UN peacekeeping missions
