= 2025 Southern Somalia offensive =

Offensive by al-Shabaab in Somalia

- Part of Somali Civil War (2009–present)
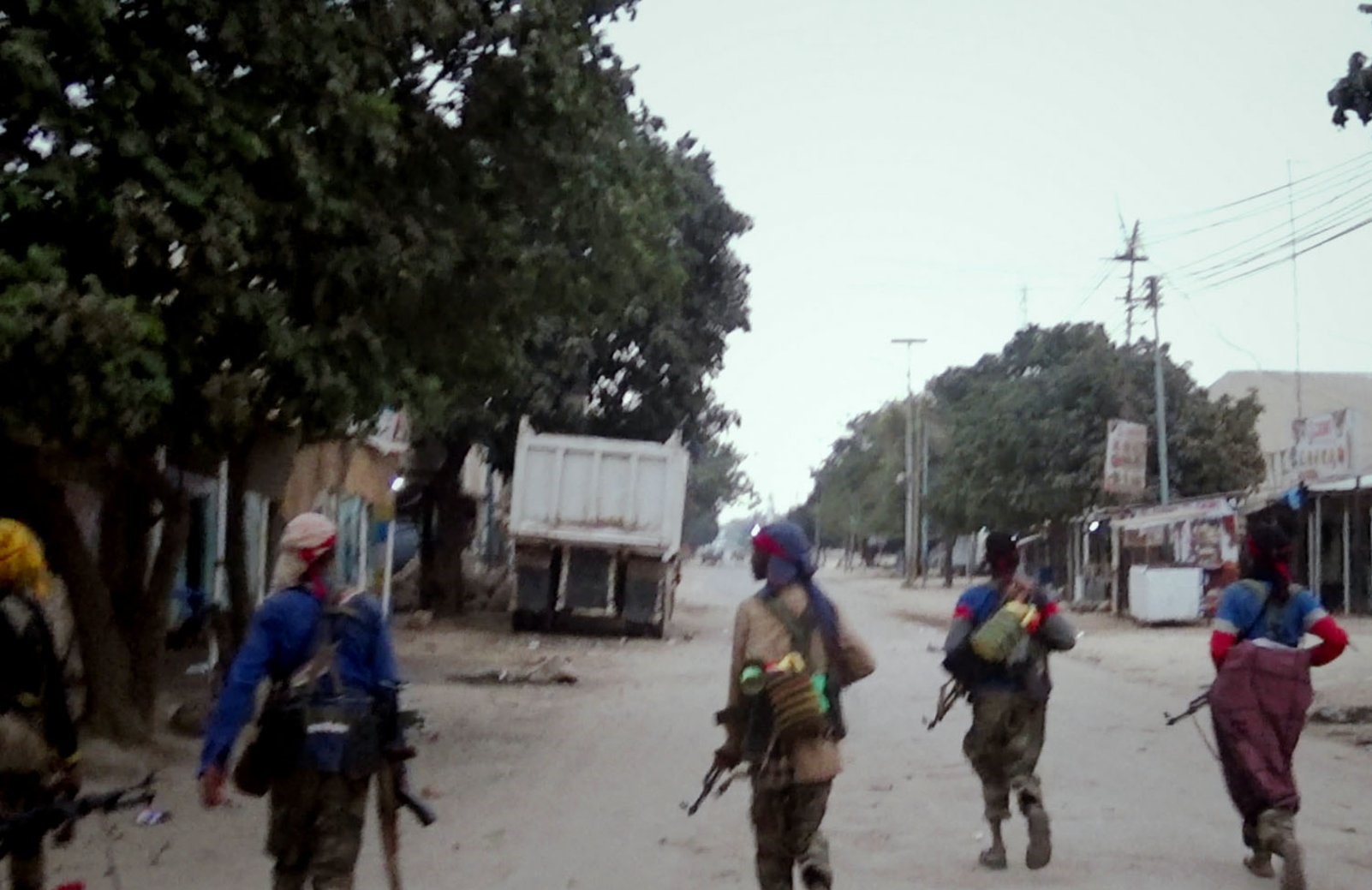
- Al-Shabaab fighters during the battle of Bal'ad, Somalia on February 27
Date	20 February – April−May 2025
Location	Central and south Somalia (Hiran, Middle Shabelle, Lower Shabelle, Banaadir, Bakool, Lower Juba, and Bay); Northeast Kenya (Mandera County)
Result	Inconclusive
Territorial changes	Al-Shabaab seizes multiple towns and villages in central Somalia, some later recaptured by the Somali National Army and allied forces

Belligerents
Somalia; Hirshabelle; Jubaland; Turkey; Kenya; Supported by: United Nations; United Arab Emirates; United States; Ethiopia; Uganda; Djibouti; Egypt; Qatar; Russia; United Kingdom; Italy; Burundi	al-Shabaab

Commanders and leaders
(Somalia) Odowa Yusuf Raage (Somalia) Sahal Abdullahi Omar (Somalia) Abukar Abdulle Garmaqate † (Somalia) Mohamed Nur Jareere † (Somalia) Haji Fareey † (Somalia) Hussein Haji Mohamed † (Somalia) Nur Mohamed Gabow † (Somalia) Asad Osman Afrah † (Somalia) Abdullahi Aden Hussein (WIA) (Somalia) Abdirahman Hujale † (Hirshabelle) Ali Abdullahi Hussein (Hirshabelle) Abdi Yusuf Salad † (United States) Michael Langley (Ethiopia) Berhanu Jula; Seif Salim Rashid; Joseph Musoke Ssemwanga; Zakaria Cheikh Ibrahim; Abdel Mageed Saqr; Recep Tayyip Erdoğan	Ahmed Diriye; Mahad Karate; Ali Mohamed Rage; Yusuf Dhegnaas †; Abukar Buulle (surrendered); Mansoor Timo-Weyne †; Mohamed Mire †; Abu Hanifa †; Nur Abdi Roble †; Abbas Hool †; Jaabir †; Ahmed Mohamed (Mas'ud) †; Abdullahi Abukar Ali †; Hussein Moallim Hassan (Magaalabeen) †

Units involved
Somali Armed Forces; Somali National Army; Danab Brigade; Gorgor Brigade; 17th Gorgor Brigade; 175th Battalion; 14th October Brigade; 146th Battalion; Somali Air Force; Somali Custodial Corps; Somali Police Force; NISA; Jubaland Dervish Force; Hirshabelle forces; Ma'awisley militias; United Arab Emirates Armed Forces; United Arab Emirates Air Force; AFRICOM; US Air Force; AUSSOM; Ethiopian National Defense Force; Ethiopian Army; Ethiopian Air Force; Kenya Army; Uganda People's Defence Force; Ugandan Land Forces; Ugandan Air Force; Djiboutian Army; Egyptian Army	Military of Al-Shabaab

Strength
Per UN: 11,900 personnel; 2,500 soldiers; 1,410 soldiers; 4,500 soldiers; 1,520 soldiers; 1,091 soldiers; 500 soldiers; SADAT 3,000 mercenaries	3,000 militants

Casualties and losses
550+ killed (Somali government claim); 700 killed (al-Shabaab claim); ~230 injured Several captured 145–600 MIA (Kenya) 7 police personnel killed; 4 injured (Uganda) 12 soldiers killed, 1 Mi-24 helicopter lost (Burundi) 1 Bell 412 helicopter shot down	At least 571 killed
- 50 civilians killed 210 injured

The 2025 Southern Somalia offensive (Somali: Weeraradii Shabeelle ee 2025ka), also known as Operation Ramadan (Somali: Hawlgalka Ramadaanka), was a military campaign in central Somalia, primarily in the Middle Shabelle, Lower Shabelle and Hiran regions, with periodic clashes in the Banaadir region. The offensive was launched by jihadist militant group al-Shabaab against the Somali National Army (SNA), African Union Support and Stabilization Mission in Somalia (AUSSOM) forces, and allied Ma'awisley clan militias. The group seeks to encircle the capital, Mogadishu, and regain territory lost in the 2022 Somali government / African Union offensive, particularly strategic towns and supply routes.

The offensive began on 20 February 2025, with attacks on multiple positions of the Somali Armed Forces (SAF), including car bombs. Al-Shabaab temporarily seized several towns before being repelled by AU, SAF, and allied militia forces. Subsequent attacks in late February targeted locations such as Bal'ad, a district capital near Mogadishu. Balad and other towns were quickly recaptured. In mid-March 2025, al-Shabaab attempted to assassinate the president of Somalia. Both the United States and Ethiopia have conducted airstrikes against al-Shabaab insurgents during the fighting.

The campaign is part of a broader escalation in Somalia insurgency, with al-Shabaab attempting to exploit security gaps created by the transition from ATMIS to AUSSOM. Thousands of Ethiopian National Defence Force (ENDF) troops are reportedly preparing to deploy in an attempt to bolster SNA/AUSSOM forces. Analysts suggest the timing of the offensive may be linked to Ramadan and seasonal factors affecting militant operations.

== Attacks ==
=== Initial attacks ===
On 20 February 2025, al-Shabaab militants attacked four villages in the Middle Shabelle region with vehicles laden with explosives, they captured two villages before the Somali National Army repelled the al-Shabaab militants from two villages in heavy fighting including the village of Ali Ahmed, where at least seven Somali National Army members were killed, twenty al-Shabaab militants, and one local clan fighter were killed. Al-Shabaab militants used VBIED attacks, mortars, and attacked villages from all directions. Unnamed commanders of al-Shabaab were killed in the village of Ceel Cali Axmed. Other villages like El Baraf were attacked, with fighting from pro-government Ma'awisley Abgal clan militia until they retreated and the village of El Baraf fell to al-Shabaab with at least 93 pro-Government deaths.

In total, 130 al-Shabaab militants were killed and the villages of El-Ali, Daaru Nicma, Ali Fooldheere, and Al Kawthar were taken from al-Shabaab after brief moments of capture. Weapons, vehicles, and other military equipment were taken from al-Shabaab militants after the confrontation though the exact amount of items were never specified.

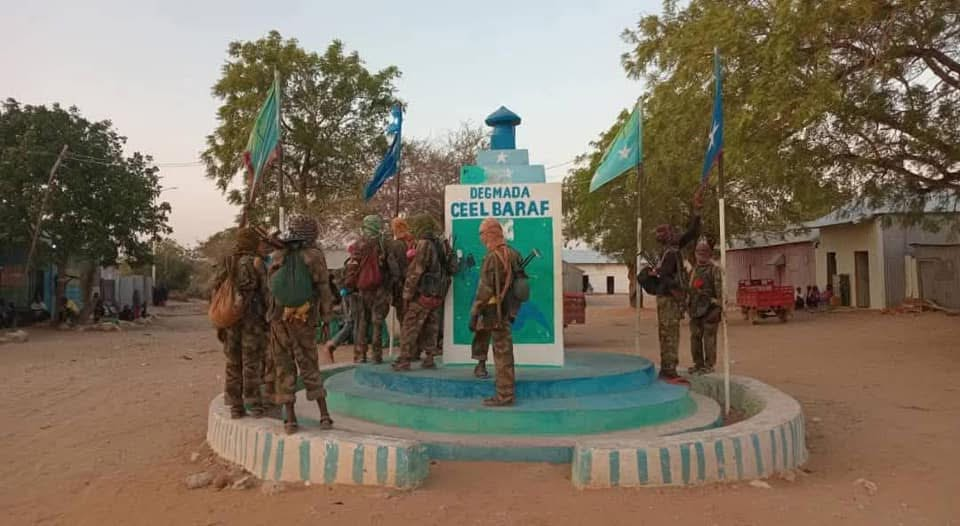
Al-Shabaab fighters in El Baraf, 21 February

According to General Ibrahim Mumin, the commander of the 3rd Brigade, 27th Division, Somali National Army, al-Shabaab failed at its attempt at capturing major villages the Middle Shabelle region. Al-Shabaab has claimed they took over four military bases in the Middle Shabelle area and Ali Ahmed, Daru Nicma, Kevser and Ali Fol Dheer settlements. Dozens of Mogadishu administration soldiers were killed and injured in the attacks with al-Shabaab releasing images of the attacks through their media outlet, al-Kataib Media Foundation, with some officers being recorded as captured by al-Shabaab.

=== Later attacks and offensive ===
==== February ====
On 25 February, a joint military operation by the Somali government and local forces in Hirshabelle state, south-central Somalia, resulted in the deaths of over 70 al-Shabaab members. Many of the al-Shabaab members were besieged and killed. On the same day, al-Shabaab claimed responsibility for attacks in the Hiiraan and Middle Shabelle regions of Somalia, seizing weapons and military vehicles. Militants launched a surprise attack on the Aboorey area in Hiiraan, targeting Macawisley militia members and claiming to have inflicted casualties and captured vehicles, though militia officials also reported inflicting losses on the attackers. Simultaneously, al-Shabaab assaulted multiple areas in Middle Shabelle, causing civilians to flee, and re-entered the El Ahmed and al-Kowthar areas, establishing a continued presence. Rising fear is reported in Aadan Yabaal, formerly held by government forces and the Ma'awisley militia. Through these attacks, al-Shabaab took two villages including Ali Ahmed.

On 26 February, al-Shabaab fighters attacked Balad district in the Middle Shabelle region early, entering the town from multiple directions and engaging Somali federal government forces in heavy fighting. While the extent of casualties remains unclear, government-run media reported that the attack was defeated. Al-Shabaab militants attacked military bases in the Balad district.

On 27 February, mortar shells were fired from the Middle Shabelle area at Mogadishu ahead of a planned visit by Ethiopian Prime Minister Abiy Ahmed. On the same day, fighting began in the town of Balad located 30 kilometers (18.6 miles) north of Mogadishu, with al-Shabaab militants capturing the town after storming a military base located near the town. The militants temporarily seized control of key government buildings and infrastructure, and also freed prisoners from the local prison before later withdrawing from the town.

==== March ====
On 1 March, heavy clashes ensued between Somali forces and al-Shabaab militants in Biyo Adde, a town in Middle Shabelle region, after al-Shabaab launched an assault against government checkpoints, with al-Shabaab publishing images of its fighters occupying the town. Al-Shabaab militants also attacked a house occupied by SNA commanders and soldiers in Kahda district, Mogadishu. Al-Shabaab militants also ambushed federal troops on the road between Mogadishu and Balcad, killing three and seizing weapons and motorcycles. Al-Shabaab also encircled the town of Jowhar, the administrative capital of the Hirshabelle state and located approximately 91 kilometers north of Mogadishu, the capital of Somalia.

On 2 March, the Somali National Army completed an operation that killed around 40 al-Shabaab members. Al-Shabaab also fired mortars at SNA positions in Adan Yabaal town.

On 3 March, the United States assisted with airstrikes against al-Shabaab during this operation near the El Baraf area in the Middle Shabelle region during clashes in Biyaadde according to an AFRICOM report, with Hirshabelle Vice President Yusuf Ahmed Hagar Dabageed saying "the fight will continue and will not stop until al-Shabaab is defeated." On the same day, al-Shabaab militants killed 60 Somali soldiers in coordinated attacks across several towns north of Mogadishu, though al-Shabaab claims they killed 100. These offensives have pushed closer to Mogadishu with these being the deadliest offensive by al-Shabaab in several years. On the same day as well, Somali government forces, backed by local clan militias known as Macwiisley, repelled an attack by al-Shabaab militants in the Boos-Hareeri area of the Adan Yabal district. Al-Shabaab recaptured Boos-Hareeri later that day, killing 20 SNA soldiers and wounding 13 others. Al-Shabaab also captured the town of El Ali Ahmed killing 18 SNA soldiers and wounding 36.

On 4 March, al-Shabaab militants captured the village of War Ciise, located 25 km from the provincial capital Jowhar, without a fight after Somali government forces fled, publishing images of militants patrolling the village.

On 5 March, al-Shabaab militants continued their advance towards Mogadishu through the Middle Shabelle, after the capturing of Balcad they continued south to Mogadishu. That same day the Ethiopian Air Force conducted multiple airstrikes on al-Shabaab targets in the Middle Shabelle region, marked Ethiopia's first known aerial operation in Somalia in nearly two decades since its 2006 intervention against the Islamic Courts Union. However, despite airstrikes al-Shabaab militants have largely retained their positions, with ground offensives by Somali forces and allied Ma'awisley militias yet to dislodge al-Shabaab from its newly captured territories. Al-Shabaab also launched an attack on federal positions in Yaqshid district.

On 6 March, the federal government deployed reinforcements to Middle Shabelle region to intensify its military operations in the area against al-Shabaab. Federal government officials also visit the town of Bal'ad to boost morale of federal troops.

On 7 March, al-Shabaab militants attacked and recaptured al-Kowthar in the Boos-Hareri area in the Aden Yabal district after battling Somali forces, killing several and injuring several, including Colonel Saney Abdulle. Several military vehicles were captured from the Somali soldiers by al-Shabaab including one with a Zu-23 anti-aircraft gun attached to it. The group also published images of its fighters in the town and the government militia base there. Al-Shabaab fighters also launched attacks on the Boos-Hareri village itself, with Harun Maruf reporting its re-capture. On the same day, the Somali Defense Minister Abdulkadir Mohamed Nuur confirmed Ethiopian airstrikes carried out against al-Shabaab militants in the Middle Shabelle with coordination from the Federal Government of Somalia. Former Prime Minister Mohamed Hussein Roble stated that the Federal Government is currently facing a difficult situation and needs to cooperate with the opposition and the conservatives, otherwise the country will be taken over by al-Shabaab. He also stated that apart from the Middle Shabelle region where heavy fighting is ongoing, there are fears that major battles will spread to other regions by al-Shabaab. The Somalian government also banned weapons and military vehicles from entering Aden Adde International Airport driven by security concerns raised by the Americans.

On 8 March, the Ethiopian Air Force continued its air strikes against al-Shabaab militants in the Middle Shabelle region in Somalia with cooperation from the Somali government. The Ethiopian government also deployed a large number of Ethiopian National Defense Forces (ENDF) near the border town of Ferfer in preparation for upcoming military operations targeting al-Shabaab militants in the Hiiraan and Middle Shabelle regions. Near the Boos-Hareri region, Somali soldiers conducted a military operation killing 20 al-Shabaab militants. Al-Shabaab killed, Abukar Abdulle 'Garmaqate', a senior police commander and 1st Brigade commander of the Police, and overran the villages of Bursha Sheekh, Ceel Xarar, Laba Garas and Xaruur, located near the strategic town of Adale, approximately 70 kilometers northeast of Mogadishu. The militant also released images of their fighters in Balad during their temporary occupation of the town on 28 February. Somalian officials also confirmed the death of Yusuf Dhegnaas, a senior al-Shabaab leader, in a targeted airstrike in the El Ba'ad area of the Middle Shabelle region on March 5.

On 9 March, Mukhtar Robow, Somalia's Minister of Endowments and Religious Affairs and himself a former deputy leader and former spokesman of al-Shabaab before defecting in 2017, dismissed fears that Mogadishu could fall to al-Shabaab militants in a statement, declaring that the group has lost its ability to mount a serious threat to the capital. He also rejected comparisons between al-Shabaab and extremist groups in Syria, insisting that Somalia is not on the brink of collapse stating "Mogadishu is neither Kabul nor Damascus, and Ahmed Diriye is no Ahmed al-Sharaa". Somalia's Deputy Minister of Defence, Omar Ali Abdi, also revealed that senior government officials within the administration have been sharing sensitive military intelligence directly with al-Shabaab militants. Al-Shabaab engaged in clashes with government forces killing multiple and injuring thirty six, capturing one as a prisoner of war and seizing a Bika machine gun and seven Kalashnikov rifles, in the village of Ali Ahmed, repelling five other attacks and reasserting control of the area. Al-Shabaab also attacked the town of Hareeri Caadley, killing its government-appointed mayor.

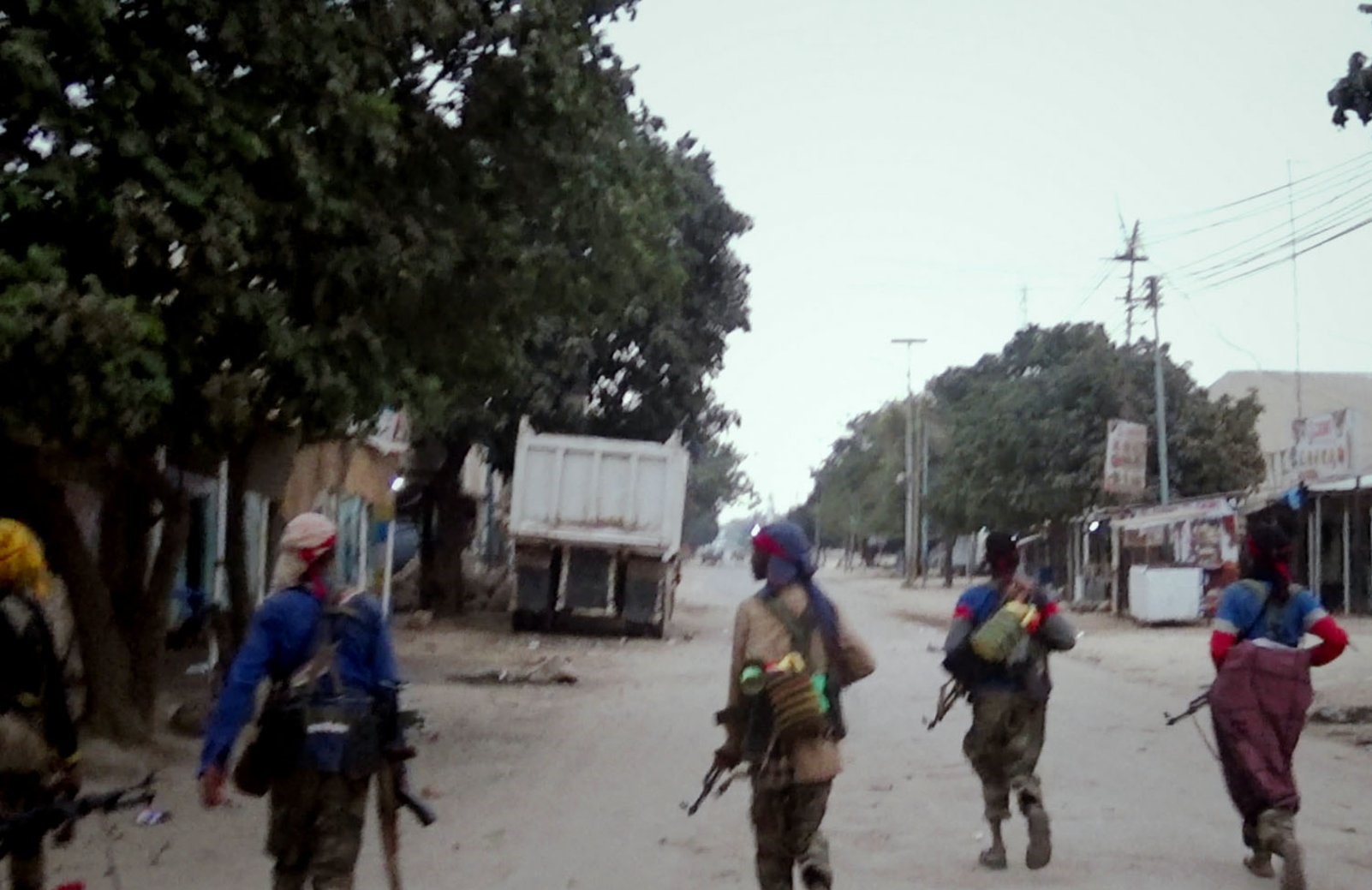
Al-Shabaab fighters in Balad, February 27

On 10 March, Somali National Army forces, including the 143rd Battalion of the 14th October Brigade were fighting in the Baladul Amin area, part of the Afgooye district. The SNA and international partners carried out an airstrike against al-Shabaab militants, killing an al-Shabaab leader that was later identified as Da'uud Mohamed Maleele, who is known as the emir of zakat tax collection of the Baladul Amin area in Afgooye district. On the same day, an airstrike coordinated by the Somali National Army targeted makeshift bridges by al-Shabaab which were used to connect regions together and make movements by al-Shabaab easier. Former deputy director of Somalia's National Intelligence and Security Agency (NISA), Abdisalam Guled, warned about al-Shabaab's growing threat, stating that al-Shabaab is shifting its methods, aiming to gain public trust while strengthening its territorial hold in central and southern Somalia, particularly in Hirshabelle. He also noted that al-Shabaab is using strategies similar to those seen with the Taliban in their takeover of Afghanistan and Hay'at Tahrir al-Sham in Syria's conflict, hoping to establish its own governing authority.

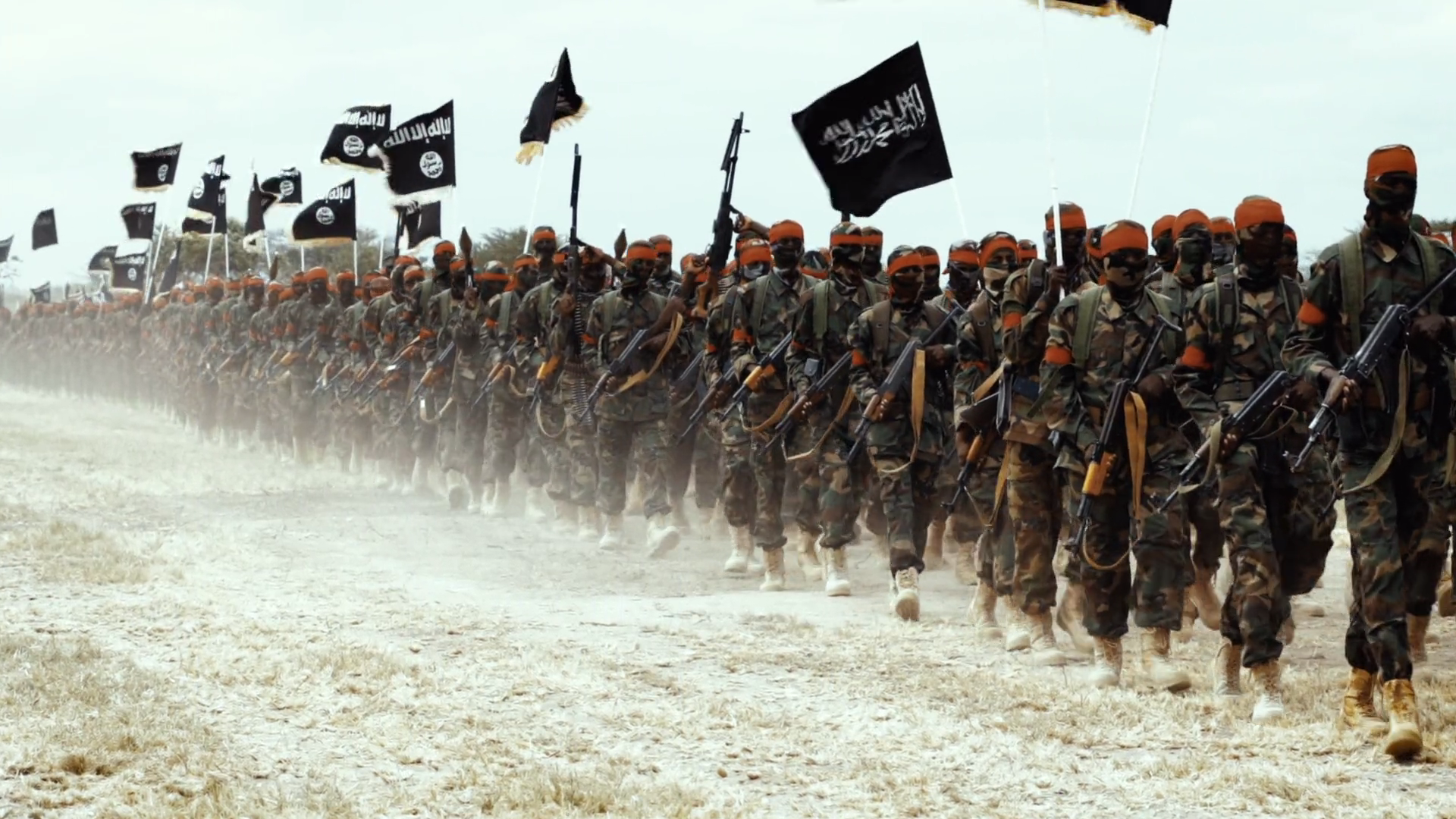
Al-Shabaab military parade, March 10

On 11 March, al-Shabaab militants bombed a hotel called the Cairo Hotel in Beledweyne, capital of the Hiiraan region in the morning time with a vehicle borne improvised explosive device, and launched an hours long inghimasi assault on the hotel. The hotel houses traditional elders and military officers involved in coordinating the government's offensive against the militant group. The bombing initially killed 4 people (including two well-known traditional elders), but the death toll increased to 10 civilians killed in the bombing. Al-Shabaab's military command also issued a statement claiming to have killed 20, including 4 military officers in the operation in Beledweyne, while also claiming to have killed 18 soldiers and wounded 30 others in clashes Bursha Sheekh near Adale. The military command also stated that the operation is ongoing.

On 12 March, Somalia's Minister of Defence, Abdulkadir Mohamed Nur, confirmed that the federal government of Somalia coordinated airstrike operations done by the United Arab Emirates and Ethiopia against al-Shabaab and Islamic State in Somalia militants in Puntland's Al Miskaad Mountains and southern Somalia. The Somali National Army claimed the killing of a senior leader and 50 al-Shabaab militants in the Damasha Shabeelow area of the Middle Shabelle region, killing Mansoor Timo-Weyne, who was the group's leader in charge of preparing and using combat vehicles who was also the target for the airstrike.

On 13 March, Somali forces and local security forces overran al-Shabaab militants targeting a heavily fortified militant base that was being used as a staging ground for attacks on civilian communities in a rural area near El Buur district in central Somalia's Galgaduud region seizing the base and killing several al-Shabaab militants.

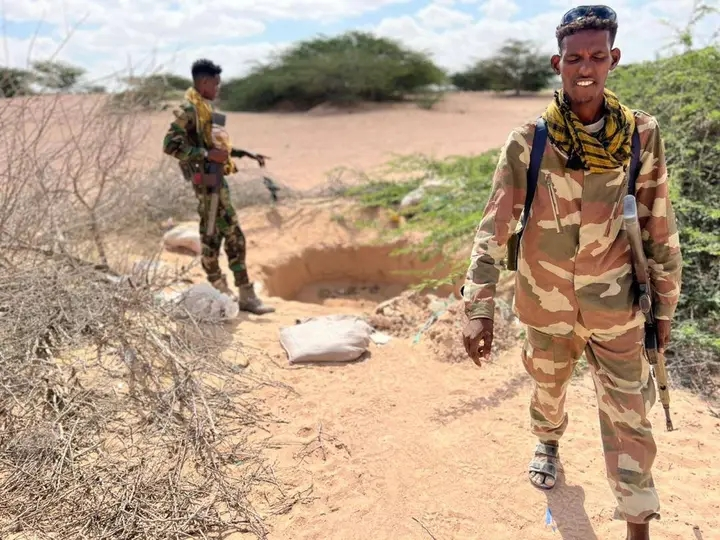
Somali National Army soldiers in South Galgaduud after an operation against al-Shabaab, March 13

On 14 March, a series of airstrikes conducted by Somali military forces in coordination with the National Intelligence and Security Agency killed 41 al-Shabaab members, including senior leaders, first in the Boos-Hareeri area of Middle Shabelle which killed 29 al-Shabaab members then the ambaluul area of Lower Shabelle which killed an additional 12 members. Al-Shabaab fired mortar shells at federal positions in Adan Yabal town.

On 15 March, al-Shabaab militants took control of the Sumadale area near the town of Adale, afterwards Al-Shabaab reported that 19 members of the Somali army were killed and 10 were injured after soldiers from Mogadishu attempted to target them. This figure later rose to 22 deaths (including 10 corpses left behind on the battlefield) and 43 wounded, with the wounded being transferred to the Haji Ali area 7 km away by the group. Another round of clashes in the Laba Garas area led to government forces suffering 7 deaths and 4 injuries, with the group capturing a government technical.

Al-Shabaab also captured Awdheegle and the district associated with it in the Lower Shabelle region including the district bridge, with several Somali soldiers being killed in the process, with 31 dead and 38 wounded. The militants overran government forces and captured key infrastructure including the town's main bridge and military barracks. The attacks targeted military installations used by the Somali National Army, with the first of the attacks starting before dawn against the Hawo Abdi area 20 kilometers (12 miles) from Mogadishu, which Somalia with the help from other foreign militaries liberated several towns in the area earlier. The militants also briefly seized the Lafoole neighbourhood of Afgooye and were also seen patrolling the Elasha Biyaha suburb of Mogadishu, both on what is called the "Afgooye corridor" marking the first time in 10 years that al-Shabaab is approaching Mogadishu. Over 150 government soldiers died or were wounded in these attacks. Later that night the Ethiopian air force launched airstrikes using barrel bombs filled with fuel, targeting the towns of El-Ba'ad and Jilib. The initial strike struck El Ba'ad, killing a mother and her two children, while the second air raid targeted Jilib, the de facto al-Shabaab capital. The strike focused on the town's bustling market, which engulfed in flames, and a university established by the militant group for Islamic sharia studies.

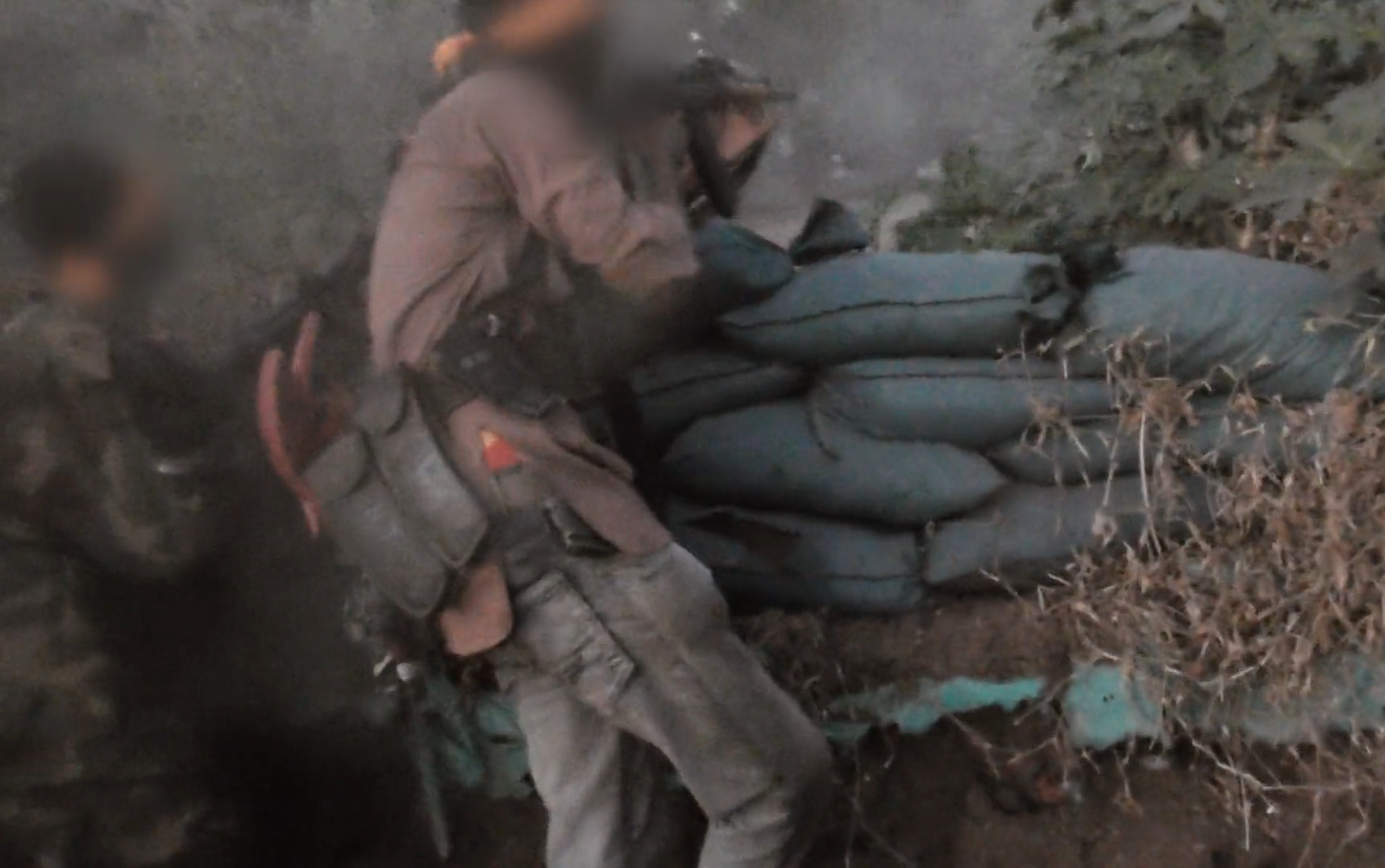
Al-Shabaab insurgent fires Ak-47 at federal government positions in Awdheegle, 15 March

On 16 March, heavily armed al-Shabaab militants were spotted patrolling the road linking Mogadishu and Afgoye for the second consecutive night on Saturday, manning security checkpoints and searching vehicles. Al-Shabaab militants seized Elasha Biyaha (Water Wells) area just outside Mogadishu, with federal troops, who offered no resistance, withdrawing and regrouping at the Siin-Dheer base, situated between the Water Wells and Tareedisho areas. The militants swiftly occupied key locations, cut power to main streets, and instructed residents to remain indoors. The group also publicly vowed to capture Mogadishu by the 17th of Ramadan Hijri (17 March). That same day al-Shabaab released a press statement revealing the civilian casualties of the Ethiopian air strikes of the night before. The federal government also mobilized and deployed a contingent of the Somali Custodial Corps, traditionally responsible for safeguarding prisoners and thus untrained for combat, to Lower Shabelle region to support the federal government's defense near Awdheegle. That same day al-Shabaab released a message from an SNA soldier who was captured by the group during their Cadaan Laxey attack. In the recording, the soldier states that his unit panicked, fled, and abandoned him during the assault, further highlighting the lack of coordination and morale within government forces.

On 17 March, the Somali Air Force conducted heavy airstrikes against al-Shabaab members in Jilib and around the Jilib District, where 20 senior and middle-ranking leaders and about 100 militia members were killed while they were holding a meeting. These airstrikes also destroyed six military bases in the area of Jilib. The Somali National Army repelled an attack against military positions in Awdheegle District of Lower Shabelle and the Buursha Sheekh area of Middle Shabelle, where the al-Shabaab militants suffered substantial losses. Al-Shabaab also launched an attack on federal forces in the village of Nuur-Gaab near Adale, killing three SNA soldiers and wounding another three.

On 18 March, the Federal Somali government issued a warning to all civilians in Jilib in the Middle Juba region to avoid targeted areas in the district and other areas controlled by al-Shabaab, this was given out through a press release that said "The attack in Jilib is part of the Federal Government of Somalia's operations targeting the remnants of terrorist groups hiding in limited areas of the country. As confirmed, no civilians were harmed in the Jilib attack. The people living in Jilib district and other areas where terrorists are taking refuge are once again called upon to stay away from enemy targets to prevent civilian casualties,". On the same day, Turkey delivered Baykar Bayraktar Akıncı to Somalia, which are capable of carrying out airstrikes, strengthening the country's operations against al-Shabaab, with the Qatari government selling planes to Somalia for a price of up to $8 million. In order to help with the fight against al-Shabaab, the Somali Government ordered hundreds of Somali police forces to the frontlines against the offensive, General Asad Osman Abdullahi, the chief of Somalia's Police Force, spearheading this operation as he created the send-off. Al-Shabaab started making incursions onto Balcad road, a long road that connecting Mogadishu to Balad, with heavy fighting breaking out on the road between al-Shabaab militants and Somali government forces, when al-Shabaab first arrived in the area known as Aargada Hareeri Aadle, between Balad and Mogadishu, where 20 Somali government forces from Aliyale attempted to push al-Shabaab back, al-Shabaab entered the Elasha Biyaha area on the night of March 17, making movements there, then retreating. They were also seen in the Lafoole and Xawo Abdi areas in the Afgooye corridor between Mogadishu and Afgooye. Al-Shabaab has also claimed responsibility for the bombing of the Somali President Hassan Sheikh Mohammed's convoy near Villa Somalia while he was travelling to Mogadishu in the town of Adan Yabal during the day after he left the presidential palace, narrowly surviving. Al-Shabaab clashed with Somali National Army soldiers after attempting to launch an assault against a government military base near Ceelbarwaaqo, located on the outskirts of the Middle Shabelle region where several al-Shabaab militants were killed. Al-Shabaab also overran the town of Warta Dibi Samatar and its military base, killing 30 as well as capturing soldiers and a large amount of equipment. Al-Shabaab militants also ambushed federal forces near Hareeri Caadle, killing 16 and wounding 12. Al-Shabaab forces also attacked federal troops near Nuur-Gaab village, killing four.

On 19 March, al-Shabaab militants launched mortars at the Halane military compound in Mogadishu near the Aden Adde International Airport, with some projectiles landing directly in and on the compound with other shells reportedly landing outside the compound's perimeter, the airport's alarm system was activated immediately following the attack, with heightening tensions in the vicinity. The Somali government also sacked Defence Minister Abdulkadir Mohamed Nur after the US insisted that if he "wasn't removed, they would reconsider their security cooperation with Mogadishu against al-Shabaab," due to his ties with Turkey. al-Shabaab militants also captured Gulane town, lifting a three-year-long siege on its strongholds in the central regions of Galgadud and Mudug.

On 20 March, al-Shabaab militants attempted to plant explosives on the outskirts of Daynile district in Mogadishu where al-Shabaab members illegally brought eight mines into the city, five of sticky bombs, and two F1 bombs, though the members were arrested by the National Intelligence and Security Agency which included Nuur Muxudiin Jibril, Maxamed Cabdiraxmaan Maxamed, and Cali Maxamed Cabdi. In the Middle Shabelle region, Somali Armed Forces conducted a special operation against al-Shabaab members two al-Shabaab members riding a Fekon motorcycle were killed in Galharuur area, under the Adan Yabal district of the Middle Shabelle region, after local forces blocked their path where the local police seized two AK-47 rifles from the slain men, the Fekon motorcycle, and other equipment, including bags used to hide from airstrikes. An al-Shabaab member attempted to throw a grenade at the Gaheyr University in Daynile where the locals captured him before he could do damage, where they beat and humiliated him in public, torturing him, before they handed him off to local police forces. Al-Shabaab militants stormed and seized the town of Sabiid and its SNA base in Lower Shabelle region, located 40 km southwest of Mogadishu. Al-Shabaab militants also targeted fleeing SNA soldiers with explosives, killing four. A total of 26 Somali soldiers died in the sweeping attack, with a number injured including Deputy Commander of the SNA General Abdullahi Aden Hussein (Cirro). A convoy of reinforcements on their way to Sabiid were also ambushed, with Mohamed Nur Jareere, a senior military officer and the commander of the Awdheegle-based 146th battalion of the SNA's 14 October division being killed by an IED in the village of Ala-Yasir near No. 50 area while en route to assist the SNA garrison in Sabiid that were under attack. Al-Shabaab also ambushed another reinforcement unit in Hawa Abdi and Elasha Biyaha between Afgooye and Mogadishu, wounding two. Al-Shabaab militants also set up roadblocks and checkpoints in Mogadishu's outskirts, on the road between Afgooye and Mogadishu. Al-Shabaab militants also attacked the town of Shalambood in the Lower Shabelle region, capturing weapons and killing Haji Fareey, an SNA commander. That night, al-Shabaab militants launched attacks on Somali military camps in Sabiid and Aanoole where the attacks were repelled by Somali National Army soldiers.

On 21 March, Somalia's National Intelligence and Security Agency announced that it, along with the Somali Air Force, carried out six airstrikes in the villages of Sabiid and Aanole, killing 82 Al Shabab fighters and injuring 19. Al-Shabaab fighters captured the town of Bariire, situated between Awdheegle and Afgooye in Lower Shabelle region, this was after the SNA fled the area after they were informed of a strong attack coming their way with a ground attack that took place the day before in the Sabiid area on the outskirts of Afgooye district, at least 26 soldiers from the SNA were killed in the attack and a large number of Somali soldiers were injured, which included the Deputy Commander of the Infantry Force, General Abdullahi Aden Hussein, and a planned operation in which a soldier from the SNA was killed took place on the outskirts of the Shalambood area, with another attack in Bay region, Al-Shabaab militants completed an attacked last night against Camp One, where Southwest State militias are stationed in the Diinsoor district. Somali National Army announced that they alongside local tribal militias launched a large-scale operation against al-Shabaab militants in the Middle Shabelle region. In the Baardale district, a man who claimed to be a member of al-Shabaab and threatened to murder everybody in the city was shot by security forces in the state of Gedo, this led to two civilians being injured.

On 22 March, Al-Shabaab's spokesperson Ali Dheere held an open press conference at a graduation ceremony of newly trained fighters from the Sheikh Abdullahi Ahmed Sahal Military Training Academy. Addressing the fighters, he highlighted the group's newly launched offensives reportedly aimed at seizing Mogadishu, stating: "The apostate forces trained in Turkey, those built up in Eritrea, those trained in Egypt, and those established by the United States—today, the apostates cannot even form a single organized unit for battle". The same day Al-Shabaab targeted Ex-Control Afgooye in Mogadishu, killing one and injuring three. Al-Shabaab also targeted an SNA post near the Coca-Cola company in Yaqshid district, injuring a soldier. By this date, Al-Shabaab briefly captured the villages of Xaawo Cabdi, Lafoole, and Ceelasha Biyaha near Afgooye.

On 23 March, Al-Shabaab fighters briefly enter the road connecting Mogadishu with Bal'ad, setting up checkpoints and searching vehicles. Senior commanders leading the fighters also addressed travelers using the road. Al-Shabaab militants also captured the village of Ilbaq, located between Bal'ad and Jowhar, as well as its military base. That same day Al-Shabaab militants ambushed an SNA convoy in the Hareri 'Aadle area, killing 16 and injuring 12. Al-Shabaab's Al-Kata'ib media also released video footage documenting the large ambush.

On 24 March, Al-Shabaab militants attacked and killed six Kenyan police officers during border clashes in the Fafi area, Garissa District. The al-Shabaab militants attacked a camp housing police reservists, with the attackers were using various weapons. An airstrike operation was conducted against officers and Al-Shabaab members where they specifically targeted a senior Al-Shabaab official named Ali Biyow Gaafow and his bodyguards, who were killed in the airstrike that took place last night in the Alkowsar area. The federal government deployed additional troops to the Mogadishu-Balcad highway after Al-Shabab fighters were sighted along the route the day before. Al-Shabaab also fired up to ten mortar rounds at two SNA military bases near Afgooye, reportedly killing eight Somali soldiers and wounding six, with Hussein Haji Mohamed (Aw Koombe), an army officer, among the dead. An Al-Shabaab IED in the Taredisho area on the outskirts of Mogadishu struck a vehicle carrying federal troops, killing four and wounding another three. Another IED in the village of Buurane in Middle Shabelle region killed two Burundian soldiers under AUSSOM, a contingent that is scheduled to leave. The Habar Gidir and Galje'el clans also donated camels to Al-Shabaab fighters on the frontline.

On 25 March, al-Shabaab relocated operations into the Bay and Bakool regions after certain defeats in the Middle Shabelle region with a statement from General Hassan Isaaq Omar, commonly known as Hassan Baidoa, the commander of the Somali National Army's (SNA) 60th Division, that security forces are outlooking and maintaining safety in the region to not allow further advances. Somali security forces revealed that they arrested Abdullahi Ahmed Mohamed, a key operative in al-Shabaab's media efforts, while on 22 March 2025, in Waajid, Bakool region, while filming a failed attack on a government military base. 30 Al-Shabaab militants raided the Kenyan village of Iresuki village, Mandera County, engaging gunfire with National Police Reservists, killing one, Abdikher Ibrahim. The Tunni clan in Kunyo Barrow donated 10 camels as well as dates to Al-Shabaab fighters fighting on the frontlines in Lower Shabelle region.

On 26 March, Al-Shabaab fighters recaptured the town of Masajid Ali Gaduud near Adale. The town was captured by Somali forces in 2022, but its recapture by al-Shabaab is considered a significant blow to Somali forces after heavy confrontation. The confrontation includes heavy bombing of a Somali military base located in Masjid Ali Gaduud, with both sides facing heavy loses, initial reports suggest that government forces managed to repel the first wave of the assault, but the town fell into al-Shabaab control. Somali forces fled to Gil Ghab, 10 kilometers from Haji Ali which Al-Shabaab militants also captured.

On 27 March, Somali forces and al-Shabaab forces clash in the Abagbeeday area, about 20 kilometers (12.5 miles) east of Hudur district in the Bakool region, according to Colonel Younis Adan Hassan, commander of the 9th Brigade, stated that the Somali National Army inflicted significant losses against al-Shabaab and seized weapons and military equipment during the operation. Somali forces claimed to have taken the town of Masajid Ali Guduud back from al-Shabaab militants with Somali Ministry of Defence spokesman Sheikh Abukar Mohamed holding a press conference and exclaimed that government and local forces repelled an attack by Al-Shabaab, and indicated that heavy losses were inflicted.

On 29 March, Al-Shabaab's Al-Kata’ib released footage documenting their earlier offensive to capture the Sabiid area near Afgooye in Lower Shabelle. They also released a video showing Al-Shabaab fighters in the Towfiiq district of the “Ali Guduud Mosque” in Middle Shabelle, featuring a speech by Abgaal clan leader Abdullahi Ali Caraaye. The Somali National Intelligence and Security Agency (NISA) announced that a joint air and ground operation in the Geelgub area of Middle Shabelle resulted in the death of 21 Al-Shabaab members, including senior leaders and fighters. The operation was conducted in coordination with local Ma’awisley militia and federal forces. NISA reiterated its warning to the public to avoid Al-Shabaab active areas, and stated that these areas remain legitimate targets. The operation is part of a broader campaign to dismantle Al-Shabaab's strongholds, although the group remains a significant threat, launching deadly attacks in rural regions. The Somali Ministry of Defense announced the results of recent operations against Al-Shabaab in the Shabelle regions. Government forces claim to have retaken Sabiib and Canoole in Lower Shabelle, inflicting heavy defeats on Al-Shabaab and conducting clearance operations, while Al-Shabaab stated that they had repelled the government offensive. Another operation in Ceelgub, Middle Shabelle, reportedly killed 30 militants, and a third operation in Buus Aduur resulted in two more Al-Shabaab deaths.

On 30 March, Somali commandos from the Danab Brigade and Jubaland Dervish Force conducted a joint operation in Lower Juba, targeting Al-Shabaab. The operation destroyed extortion centers and bases used by the group, including areas where civilians were forced to collect Zakatul Fitri. Military officials reported that the allied forces inflicted losses on Al-Shabaab during the operation. Al-Shabaab militants attacked Somali Federal Government soldiers operating near Dhusamareb in the Galgaduud region, resulting in the deaths of at least six soldiers. The militants also captured six rifles and ammunition from the killed soldiers. The Somali National Army, with the support of local forces and international partners, conducted an air and ground operation in the Masaajid Ali Gaduud forested area in Middle Shabelle, an area recently attacked by Al-Shabaab. The government reported the operation has caused significant losses for Al-Shabaab, who reportedly still maintain a presence in the strategic area.

On 31 March, Al-Shabaab cancelled its annual Eid military parade, a display of their military strength, reportedly due to the impact of ongoing airstrikes. No troops or officials were seen in parade grounds in Al-Shabaab controlled areas, and leaders only participated in Eid celebrations via voice messages, avoiding public appearances. This absence, coupled with the lack of any statement from Al-Shabaab in the conflict-ridden Middle Shabelle region, suggests that airstrikes have significantly impacted the group's power and movement, hindering their ability to operate publicly. One of these audio messages was by Sheikh Mahad Warsame Abu Abdirahman, one of the general leaders of Al-Shabaab.

==== April ====
On 1 April, the Somali National Army with cooperation of Jubaland conducted operations against al-Shabaab, with Somali forces destroying crucial checkpoints that were run by al-Shabaab in the Lower Juba to collect Zakatul Fitr for Ramadan. The Somali army killed around 70 al-Shabaab militants in the Shabelle region after the conducting of a separate operation. During the time of these operations, tensions have escalated in the Sabiid area near Afgooye in Lower Shabelle between Somali government forces and Al-Shabaab, causing residents to flee in fear of imminent conflict. Al-Shabaab, which took over Sabiid a week ago, has previously forced government forces to withdraw due to intense attacks. Escalating tensions are also causing displacement in nearby Awdheegle, where Somali forces have unsuccessfully tried to regain control. Al-Shabaab has intensified its operations during Ramadan, regaining control of several areas in Lower and Middle Shabelle, significantly undermining the Somali government's authority.

On 2 April, Al-Shabaab released footage showing its fighters still in control of Sabiid despite the federal government claiming to have recaptured the town.

On 4 April, Jubaland deployed a large force of elite Dervish troops to northern Lower Juba to intensify operations against Al-Shabaab. The move follows a successful joint assault by Somali Danab Commandos and Jubaland forces that destroyed a key militant base. State media showed troops joining Somali and international forces in the offensive. Jubaland leaders pledged to target Al-Shabaab strongholds across Lower and Middle Juba to reclaim the regions and restore civilian governance. The campaign follows a recent airstrike on Jilib, Al-Shabaab's southern stronghold, which reportedly disrupted the group's leadership. This marks an expanded effort to dismantle Al-Shabaab's grip on southern Somalia.

High rates of desertion among Somalia's security forces have drawn strong condemnation from government religious leaders and officials. On 5 April, senior government cleric Sheikh Ali Wajis publicly denounced soldiers who fled their posts following militant attacks, labeling them apostates and urging punitive actions such as arrest. His statements were supported by Custodial Corps commander who warned that deserters—and their families, including parents—could face arrest or execution. Analysts have cautioned that declining military resolve may have severe consequences and that disparaging statements from government officials are eroding Somali army morale.

On 5 April, Somali National Army commander Nur Farey of the 14 October Battalion was assassinated in Lower Shabelle. Farey had been taking lead in coordinating government operations in the region and had played a vital role in holding the line against the insurgent offensive. His death was consequently a significant blow to the morale of the army. That same day the heavily fortified presidential palace Villa Somalia was hit with a mortar barrage. The attack also targeted other federal government facilities. The mortar attack injured 6. The Somali Air Force alongside NISA executed air strikes in 6 different locations killing a total of 80 al-Shabaab militants, with the first operation taking place in the Sabiid and Canoole areas of the Lower Shabelle region, the bombings were accompanied by a direct operation carried out by NISA ground forces, and 21 Al-Shabaab were killed, the second operation took place at a meeting place of senior Al-Shabaab leaders in the Al-Kawthar district of Middle Shabelle region, and all the leaders present there were killed, according to NISA, the third operation took place in Bursha Sheikh area of Middle Shabelle region, and more than 19 members, including leaders and militia members belonging to Al-Shabaab, were killed, the fourth operation took place in the same Bursha Sheikh area of Middle Shabelle region, and 17 members of Al-Shabaab were killed, who were isolated in the area when they were targeted, some of whom had injuries from the previous attack, the fifth operation took place in Aw-baalle area of Middle Shabelle region, and a number of FEKON motorcycles loaded with mines were destroyed, while seven members were killed on the spot, according to the NISA press release, and the sixth operation took place near the Al-Kawthar district, when local defense forces attacked a location where militants were stationed. Following the attack, NISA carried out airstrikes in the same area, killing 13 Al-Shabaab members. Clashes took place on the outskirts of Masagaway in the Galgaduud region where one Somali soldier was killed and guns with ammunition were seized. Al-Shabaab attacked a military camp owned by the Somali forces in the Labagaras area of the Middle Shabelle region, killing several federal forces.

On 7 April, Somali government forces, supported by local militias, seized the Runirgod district from al-Shabaab militants in the Middle Shabelle region with government forces conducting security operations in the area to pursue fleeing militants and secure the region. During an al-Shabaab attack, three United Nations workers were killed with another three were injured on the Halane military base in the capital, Mogadishu, after being struck with mortar rounds.

On 8 April, the Somali National Army launched operations against al-Shabaab, advancing into the Ruun-Nirgood area, alongside local forces with several al-Shabaab positions being destroyed and Somali forces capturing the Aboorey area in Hiran and other important villages. The Somali Armed Forces and allied local forces, supported by United States air strikes against militants, carried out operations in Runirgud, Guulane, El Ali Ahmed in Middle Shabelle, and in Buloburde and Jalalaqsi in Hiran, in an attempt to expel the militants from these areas.

On 9 April, clashes erupted in the Aboorey area of Bulobarde district in Hiraan State between al-Shabaab forces and Somali forces which resulted in the killing of 53 Somali soldiers, including Asad Osman Afrah, the commander of the Danab Brigade, and the injuring of 87 Somali soldiers. Al-Shabaab's military leadership reported on recent clashes in central Somalia, Al-Shabaab fought against Somali forces and their allies in the Aboorey area of Bulobarde, Hiraan State, and other locations. Al-Shabaab also states they successfully repelled an attack to reclaim the Aboorey area and inflicted significant casualties on the opposing forces. Additionally, they reported fighting in Middle Shabelle State, claiming victories and inflicting further casualties, along with an artillery attack on enemy bases. Aboorey is vital for Al-Shabaab's movement between Hiiraan, Middle Shabelle, and Galmudug.

On 10 April, the federal government arrested members of the Custodial Corps who deserted frontline positions in ongoing operations against Al-Shabaab in the Middle and Lower Shabelle regions following reports that hundreds of police officers have gone missing after deployment to volatile frontline areas. Many are feared to have either melted into civilian populations or defected to Al-Shabaab. Mahad Abdirahman, the commander of the Somali Custodial Corps, earlier declared that soldiers who abandon their posts would face arrest or execution, along with potential punitive measures against their families.

On 11 April, Somali troops, supported by Ma'awisley forces, engaged in intense fighting with Al-Shabaab in the Aboorey settlement, which Al-Shabaab briefly controlled before being pushed back by the SNA. The Somali army has besieged Al-Shabab fighters in the settlement, blocking roads and cutting off reinforcements, aiming to force their surrender due to dwindling supplies and increasing casualties. Al-Shabaab fighters used trenches and a mosque for cover. The Somali army intended to continue the operation to restore security. Al-Shabaab's initial goal was to control the road connecting key settlements, and many of the Al-Shabaab fighters in Aboorey were reportedly of Oromo ethnicity. Al-Shabaab claimed to have killed 26 Somali soldiers (of which two bodies were left behind by the SNA) and injured 52 others in Aboorey.

On 12 April, Abdullahi Dheere, the Hirshabelle spokesperson for the Middle Shabelle region, resigned and accused the Hirshabelle administration led by Ali Guudlawe and the Federal Government of failure in the ongoing fighting in the Middle Shabelle region, also accusing the mayor of Bal'ad town (and the governor of the wider Bal'ad district) of "being a coward".

On 15 April, Al-Shabaab militants assassinated the deputy mayor of Sabiid town, Mohamed Hassan Jiir (nicknamed Maqas) in Elasha Biyaha in the outskirts of Mogadishu.

On 16 April, after over a week of heavy fighting the SNA withdrew from Aboorey, with Al-Shabaab capturing it as well as the villages of Mabah (blocking regrouping government forces in the area) and Yasooman. Al-Shabaab also overran and captured the strategic town of Adan Yabal and its ten SNA outposts in the Middle Shabelle region after heavy fighting, with 100 fighters routing 2,500-3,000 government troops and allied clan militias, forcing them to withdraw from the various locations. The SNA and allied Ma'awisley militias have been using Adan Yabal as an operating base for raids against al Shabaab. In a press release Al-Shabaab claimed to have killed 55 soldiers and injured 71 in Adan Yabal, with the figure increasing to 400 dead SNA soldiers. The Chief of Staff of the SNA, Odowaa Yusuf Rageh, as well as Hassan Ali Nur (Shuute), the chief of the Somali military courts in Mogadishu, allegedly fled the fighting.

On 17 April, Al-Shabaab fighters hit SNA positions in Arbacow, Lower Shabelle region, injuring five soldiers. As a response to recent Al-Shabaab gains, a US airstrike targeted militant base in Adan Yabal killing 12 Al-Shabaab militants and also destroyed a ship carrying weapons to the militant group. In another incident an Al-Shabaab attack in the military base in the southwestern city of Baidoa was repelled by SNA resulting in 35 militants killed.

On 18 April, In the early morning, an assault involving explosions and gunfire happened against a military base in Baay Burjeed resulting in, according to South West State officials, the killing of several Al-Shabaab militants and recovering their bodies. The local population and officials praised the troops' response.

On 19 April, al-Shabaab killed 8 civilians, including 5 women, in the Adan Yabaal region, who were owners of restaurants, military facilities, laundry facilities and garages. Al-Shabaab hit the Habar Khadijo NISA headquarters in Mogadishu with mortars. These mortars struck areas of Mogadishu which resulted in the deaths of two civilians and the injuring of five others. There were other attacks by al-Shabaab in the areas of Hamar Weyne, Hamar Jajab, and Waberi districts, where mortars and artillery shells struck both civilian homes and open areas which resulted in one civilian being killed and another injured.

On 20 April, reports were made stating that al-Shabaab is planning attacks in the Moqokori district of Hiran after Somali National Army soldiers withdrew from that district with only Ma’awisley forces in that area. Al-Shabaab militants have resurfaced in rural areas near Baidoa in Somalia's Bay region, with the Somali government warning farmers to stay away from their fields. Villages like Gasarta, Dambalka, and Baay-Burjeet have reported sightings. The threats come shortly after Somali forces claimed a victory over al-Shabaab in Deeynuunay, suggesting the group's actions may be retaliatory. Locals report that militants are moving in groups and verbally warning civilians. This has raised fears about food access and safety in the region. The Somali government has not yet responded to the situation. An airstrike in Adan Yabaal, a key al-Shabaab stronghold, killed 12 militants, including senior leaders, according to Somalia's information ministry. The town has been used by al-Shabaab for launching operations. While the Somali government says the group is weakened, al-Shabaab remains a serious threat, having recently claimed to recapture Adan Yabaal after an attack involving heavy explosives. No civilian casualties were reported in the airstrike, but control of the town remains uncertain. Al-Shabaab militants assassinated Farah Aydiid Jama, an Ethiopian consular working in Garoowe in the Nugal region as revealed by the Khatumo State Police on 23 April, with Jama working with Ethiopians in Puntland.

On 22 April, around 500 Turkish military personnel arrived in Mogadishu to aid the fight against al-Shabaab after talks between Somali President Hassan Sheikh Mohamud and Turkish President Recep Tayyip Erdoğan, reinforcing a broader defense pact. The United States Africa Command carried out airstrikes in Somali waters against illegal weapons smuggling on boats that were being taken to al-Shabaab, this operation destroyed two boats attempting to covertly smuggle weapons. The Danab Brigade and Jubaland commandos carried out an operation against al-Shabaab in the Lower Juba region, specifically in the western part of the region called Kaam-jaroon, where 9 members of al-Shabaab were killed, including leaders and militants from the group, and others were injured. Ma’awiisley militias in central Somalia launched a major assault against Al-Shabaab militants near Aadan Yabaal in the Middle Shabelle region, following Al-Shabaab's capture of the town. The offensive, targeting known militant hideouts, resulted in several Al-Shabaab fighters being killed. The goal is to prevent Al-Shabaab from regrouping and launching further attacks. Aadan Yabaal's strategic location makes it a frequent target. That same day the Dabarre clan donated 200 goats in a ceremony held in the Al-Shabaab stronghold of Bu'ale in Middle Juba region, intending to support Al-Shabaab fighters who are currently fighting in the front lines of the war.

On 23 April, Senior officials from the South West State of Somalia arrived at the frontlines near Deynuunay in the Bay region to oversee and support intensified operations against Al-Shabaab. The officials were there to assist in offensives, delivering supplies, and reinforcing troops.

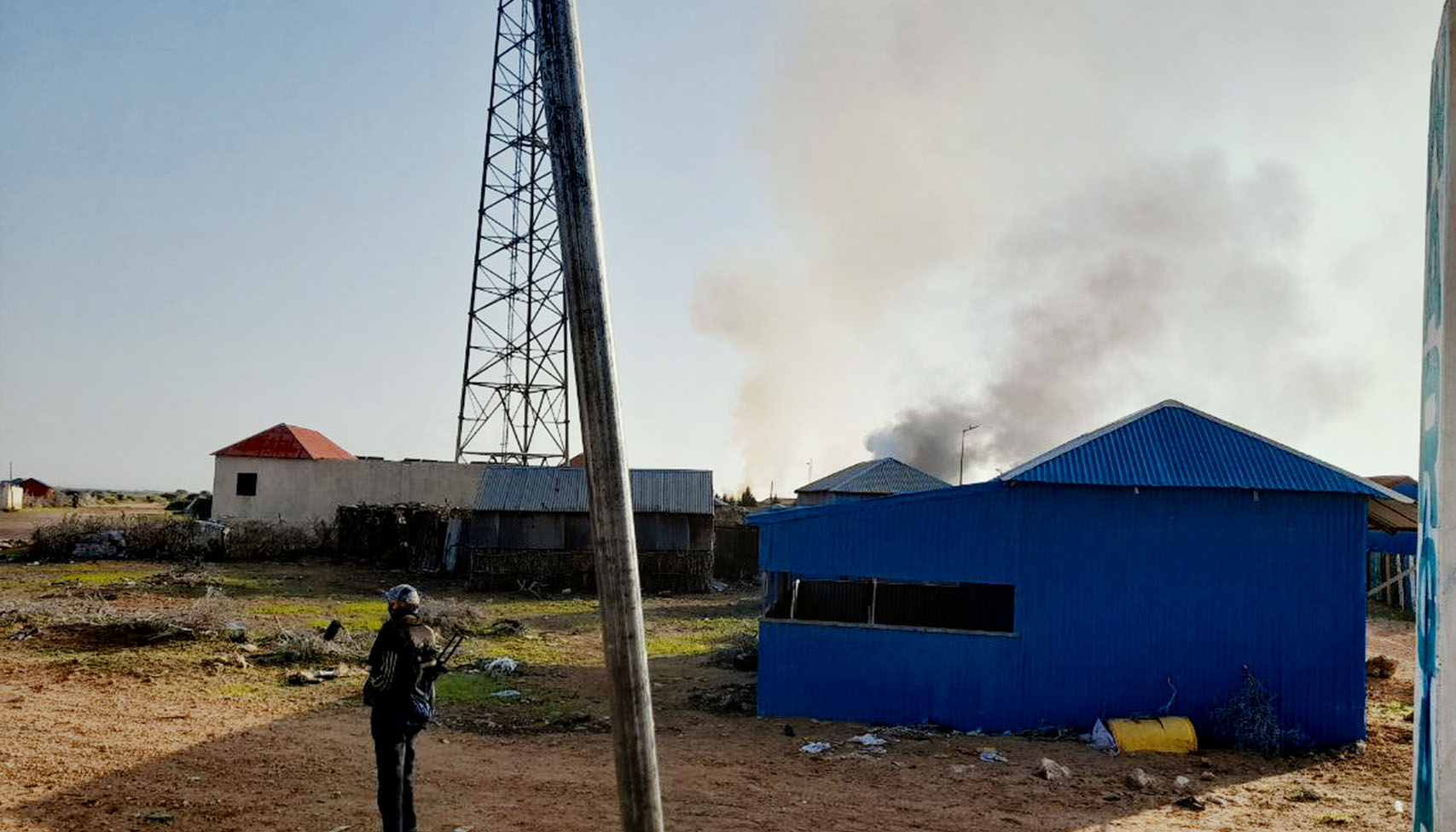
Al-Shabaab militants at the Wargaadhi military base, April 24, 2025

On 24 April, Al-Shabaab fighters battled Somali troops and allied forces for control of a strategic army base in Wargaadhi, Middle Shabelle, potentially severing a key road between Mogadishu and Galmudug State. Al-Shabaab claimed to have captured the base and town, a claim the government denied. The government stated over 40 jihadists were killed, while an army officer reported that al-Shabaab captured Wargaadhi after heavy fighting, resulting in casualties on both sides. Reinforcements were difficult to send due to Al Shabaab-controlled routes. Al-Shabaab stated that 60 federal troops have been killed and 21 have been injured.

On 25 April, Al-Shabaab fighters attacked federal troops stationed in the outskirts of the newly captured Yasooman village in Hiiraan, killing six federal soldiers including an intelligence officer named Abdullahi Nur Ahmed (Timajilac). Al-Shabaab claimed that three were wounded, while four fled the scene of the battle, leaving behind the bodies of the dead soldiers.

On 26 April, Al-Shabaab's Islamic Sharia court in Janaale District executed Abdullahi Abdirahman Ali, aged 27, after sentencing him to death for working with the federal government's intelligence service.

On 27 April, divisions of the Somali National Army including 26th unit, 6th division, and 60th division carried out a heavy operation against al-Shabaab targeting senior leaders in the Madulow area of the Lower Shabelle, this operation killed two leaders named Hassan Biid and Abdullahi Garweyne alongside several members of al-Shabaab, a base constructed by al-Shabaab was also destroyed.

On 28 April, Al-Shabaab mortar shelling targeting the heavily fortified Halane base camp near Mogadishu's Aden Adde Airport killed three Americans and wounded six, while critically wounding seven Italians. In a ceremony held in the Al-Shabaab stronghold of Bu'ale in Middle Juba region, the Ajuran clan donated 200 goats to Al-Shabaab fighters on the frontline.

On 30 April, In Kenya’s Mandera County, near the Somali border, suspected Al-Shabaab militants attacked a minibus carrying quarry workers, killing at least five and wounding two others. The attack occurred around 6:00 am near the village of Bor Abor.

==== May ====
On 3 May, Al-Shabaab launched an attack on a military base on the border of Hiran and Middle Shabelle regions, which was repelled by the Somali National Army and local militias. The Somali government claimed that 50 Al-Shabaab members were killed.

On 4 May, Five elite Special Operations Group (SOG) police officers were killed and five injured in an Al-Shabaab ambush in Boni Forest, Kenya, after pursuing suspected terrorists. The injured officers were flown to Nairobi for treatment. A multi-agency operation is underway to pursue the attackers. The attack highlights the ongoing threat from Al-Shabaab in areas bordering Somalia, particularly in Boni Forest. Interior Cabinet Secretary Kipchumba Murkomen condemned the attack, pledged to intensify counter-terror operations, and emphasized the need for better support for officers. Authorities have called on local residents for information.

On 5 May, the Somali Danab special forces, supported by Jubaland police, conducted a coordinated operation targeting Al-Shabaab in Lower Juba. The offensive aimed to dismantle Al-Shabaab infrastructure used for planning attacks. Several militant hideouts and operational centers were destroyed. The primary goal is to restore security in the region, especially around Kismayo. Officials urged local residents to support the security forces in rooting out the insurgents. A heavy explosion targeted Ethiopian troops traveling near Baidoa, Somalia, causing deaths, injuries, and significant vehicle damage. The Transitional Federal Government of South West Somalia and Ethiopian officials have not commented. Al-Shabaab has claimed responsibility, stating they inflicted heavy casualties on the Ethiopian forces in a planned operation.

On 17 May, Colonel Abdirahman Hujale, commander of the 26th Brigade of the 27th Division of the Somali National Army, was assassinated while commanding reinforcements near the Moqokori frontline in the Hiran region. Al-Shabaab claimed that 22 national army soldiers were killed in the fighting in Moqokori. The Somali Air Force's air strikes allegedly hit the positions of the Mawisley militia.

On 19 May, Somali National Army and local forces engaged in gun fight with Al-Shabaab militants and managed to kill 70 militants in border between Hiiraan and Middle Shabelle.

On 22 May, Security forces in the Juba region killed 48 Al-Shabaab militants and captured few alive and huge cache of weapons was also seized in the Operation.

On 29 May, the Somali National Army, with the support of local militias, launched a coordinated attack on al-Shabaab positions in the Aboorey area of Buula Burte County in the Hiiraan region. Abu Hanifa, the commander of al-Shabaab in the Aboorey area, was killed, and several other militants were killed.

==== June ====
On 2 June, Al-Shabaab militants have reportedly taken control of Hawadley village, located 91 kilometers northeast of Mogadishu, after Burundian forces under the African Union Support and Stabilization Mission in Somalia (AUSSOM) withdrew from the strategic military base. additionally the militant claims it shot down an African Union helicopter used by Burundian troops near Hawadley area in Middle Shabelle region. The Somali Defence minister rejected this claim saying Helicopter in fact suffered technical malfunctions but was retrieved soon after.

On 7 June, an operation executed by the SNA in the town of El Hareeri eliminated more than 40 Al-Shabaab militants including two senior commanders. The commanders were Abuu Anas, who was Al-Shabaab ’s chief logistics coordinator for combat units, and Mohamed Ahmed, a senior field commander. Al-Shabaab briefly captured the town of El Hareeri but was unable to hold it. Nur Abdi Roble, a mid-level leader of the al-Shabaab group, was also killed in the fighting.

Between 8 and 9 of June, 25 Al-Shabaab militants, including three senior field commanders were killed in an operation by SNA in Sabiid-Caanoole area in Lower Shabelle region. Another 5 Al-Shabaab militants, including three field commanders were killed in Hiiraan region.

On 11 June, Kenyan Security Forces killed two Al-Shabaab militants while others fled with injuries. The clash occurred when militants were trying to set up an IED in a roadside in Mandera County, Kenya. On the same day, Al-Shabaab militants captured the town of El Hareeri in Hiraan region pushing out SNA and local militias from the area.

On 12 June, an operation by SNA killed 13 Al-Shabaab militants in middle Shabelle region.

On 16 June, more than 150 Somali National Army soldiers and clan militias surrendered to the Al-Shabaab in Hawadley town in Middle Shabelle region. Most of the surrendered soldiers belonged to the Jareer Weyne clan.

On 18 June, Abbas Hool, a senior member of the al-Shabaab group and the chief planner of operations in the Banadir and Shabelle regions, died of his injuries after being attacked by the Somali military.

On 19 June, the Somali Air Force carried out an airstrike on the al-Shabaab stronghold of Maqooqaha, about 100 km (62 miles) northwest of Kismayo in Lower Juba region, claiming to have killed at least 25 militants.

On 21 June, the Somali National Army recaptured the towns of Sabiid and Canoole with the help of the Ugandan army.

On 22 June, Al-Shabaab claimed to have captured the town of El Qohle in Hiiraan region, killing 31 Somali soldiers.

On 23 June, seven Ugandan soldiers part of the AUSSOM and 30 Al-Shabaab militants, were killed in a three day offensive led by the AUSSOM and the SNA in the Sabiid-Canoole area, southwest of Mogadishu to retake a strategic town in Lower Shabelle from Al-Shabaab militants. On the same day, the Somali National Army, supported by local Macawisley militias, killed at least 20 Al-Shabaab militants during a joint offensive in the Mabaah and Gayacad areas of the Hiiraan region.

On 24 June, Somalia's National Intelligence and Security Agency in coordination with international partners, carried out an operation at Gaycad Junction in the Mahbah area of the Hiiraan region, killing 13 al-Shabaab militants.

On 26 June, an airstrike by Somali Forces killed 18 Al-Shabaab militants and destroyed two pickup trucks in Mabaah village in the Hiiraan region.

==== July ====
On 1 July, Danab commandos and Jubaland forces kill over 50 Al-Shabaab militants in Lower Juba region, the joint operations were carried out in Maqooqaha and surrounding villages, targeting areas where Al-Shabaab fighters had regrouped following recent offensives in June 2025.

On 2 July, the elite Danab commandos of the Somali National Army killed Jaabir, a senior commander of the Al-Shabaab, and eight of his bodyguards in a targeted operation in the Bariire area of the Lower Shabelle region.

On 3 July, a Ugandan Mi-24 attack helicopter deployed with the African Union peacekeeping mission in Somalia crashed at Mogadishu airport, killing five passengers.

On 4 July, four al-Shabaab members, including commanders Ali Abuukar Mohamed Saaqle and Mohamed Addow Isse, were killed by government forces in Guulane area of Middle Shabelle region.

On 5 July, the Somali National Army repelled an attack by Al-Shabaab on the town of Gumarre in the Hiiraan region, killing 10 Al-Shabaab militants.

On 7 July, Al-Shabaab militants recapture Moqokori, a town in the Hiiraan region of Somalia they lost in September 2022, following a local uprising led by Ma'awisley fighters. The heavy fighting resulted in the deaths of at least 40 Somali National Army and Ma’awisley fighters, who lost control of the town after a suicide bombing and an attack by the militants.

==== August ====
On 8 August 2025, the Somali National Army (SNA) in coordination with Ugandan troops under the African Union Support and Stabilization Mission in Somalia (AUSSOM), recaptured the strategic town of Bariire in Lower Shabelle following a week-long offensive. The Minister of Defence confirmed that the operation resulted in the deaths of more than 120 al-Shabaab militants, including several field commanders, while dozens more were wounded or taken prisoner.

The joint forces seized a large cache of rifles, machine guns, explosives, and other military equipment abandoned by the retreating fighters. Government and AUSSOM forces captured several militants alive and are conducting clearance operations in Bariire and its surroundings, seizing a significant cache of weapons and military supplies.

On 10 August 2025, the Somali National Army announced the killing of a senior al-Shabaab member who was accused of forcibly recruiting child soldiers. The individual had held multiple positions within the group and most recently served as its financial officer. The killing occurred during a military operation conducted by Somali government forces in the city of Hudur, located in the southwestern Bakool region. The operation reportedly disrupted an al-Shabaab network operating in the area.

== Timeline of captured locations ==
=== February ===
Date	Town	Region	Ref.
February 20	Al-Kowthar	Middle Shabelle	
February 21	Ceel Baraf (recaptured by SNA)	Middle Shabelle	
February 21	Miir Taqwa (recaptured by SNA)	Middle Shabelle	
February 22	Ali Fol Dheer	Middle Shabelle	
February 26	Daaru Nicma	Middle Shabelle	
February 28	Bal'Ad (Balcad) (recaptured by SNA)	Middle Shabelle	

=== March ===
Date	Town	Region	Ref.
March 6	Biyo Cadde	Middle Shabelle	
March 7	War Ciise	Middle Shabelle	
March 9	Boos Hareri	Middle Shabelle	
March 21	Guulane (recaptured by SNA)	Middle Shabelle	
March 24	Awdheegle	Lower Shabelle	
March 26	Masaajid Cali Guduud (recaptured by SNA)	Middle Shabelle	
March 30	Sabiid and Caanoole (recaptured by SNA)	Lower Shabelle	

=== April ===
Date	Town	Region	Ref.
April 5	Bariire (Recaptured by SNA)	Lower Shabelle	
April 16	Aboorey	Hiiraan	
April 16	Mabah	Hiiraan	
April 16	Yasooman	Hiiraan	
April 16	Adan Yabal	Middle Shabelle	
April 24	Wargaadhi (recaptured by SNA)	Middle Shabelle	

=== June ===
Date	Town	Region	Ref.
June 2	Hawadley	Middle Shabelle	
June 11	El Hareeri	Hiraan	
June 22	El Qohle	Hiraan	

=== July ===
Date	Town	Region	Ref.
July 7	Moqokori	Hiraan	
July 14	Tardo	Hiraan	
July 20	Sabiid	Hiraan	
July 20	Anole	Hiraan	
July 27	Mahas	Hiraan	

== Reactions ==
Due to the attacks, on 4 March 2025, the United Nations Security Council extended their sanctions against al-Shabaab focusing on illegal arms exports and charcoal exports. The sanctions will be in effect until 13 December 2025, with the renewal of a committee of experts that will monitor the sanctions on al-Shabaab until 13 January 2026.

Because of al-Shabaab's offensive, Puntland's Minister of Justice and Religious Affairs, Mohamed Abdiwahaab, accused the Federal Government of Somalia of not properly stopping attacks and not doing enough against al-Shabaab. Though, on 5 March 2025, Ahmed Mohamed Islam made a press release stating that they would fight alongside Somali government military forces and the Ma'awisley clan militias in Jubaland against al-Shabaab.

On 5 March 2025, former President of Somalia, Sharif Sheikh Ahmed, former Prime Minister, Hassan Ali Khaire, and member of the Somali parliament, Abdirahman Abdishakur Warsame issued a joint press statement supporting the brave forces fighting against al-Shabaab and the Islamic State. Though they said that the President of Somalia, Hassan Sheikh Mohamud, had engaged in political conflict with some of the states of Somalia, which had stalled the operations against al-Shabaab.

After the offensive expanded, the United States Embassy in Somalia warned of the possibility of terrorist attacks including the Aden Adde International Airport in the capital, Mogadishu calling on American citizens in Somalia to exercise caution and avoid gatherings and demonstrations. It also announced the cancellation of all movements of its employees until further notice, as part of precautionary measures to confront potential threats. The Somali government attempted to downplay the warning with the Somali Minister of Transport and Civil Aviation, Fardowsa Osman Egal, insisting there was no imminent threat that justified the flight cancellations. "There is no security situation that warrants the suspension of international flights to Mogadishu," Egal told Voice of America Somali. "We continue to receive complete intelligence briefings, and no direct threats have been relayed to us." The President of Somalia, Hassan Sheikh Mohamud, accused the United States of sending out these alerts to undermine and destabilize the Somali government and to cause mass paranoia and panic. Turkish Airlines as a result temporarily suspended all flights to Somalia's capital Mogadishu until March 12 following the US terror alert, while Qatar Airways suspended all flight to Mogadishu indefinitely.

On 6 March 2025, the Somalia's Council of Ministers expanded security in Mogadishu due to the advances by al-Shabaab and to fight against al-Shabaab.

On 15 March 2025, Puntland's Minister of Information, Mohamud Aidid Dirir, warned Somalia might undergo the same fate that happened with Afghanistan: "Most American diplomats have been evacuated. We fear Mogadishu could face the same fate as fall of Kabul."

On 17 March 2025, Ethiopia stated they would not move infantry from Bay and Bakool Regions, where they operate as part of the AU force, to Middle Shabelle. On the same day, the President of Hirshabelle State, Ali Abdullahi Hussein, who recently returned to his office for a brief period, held a virtual meeting with the United States Ambassador to Somalia, Mr. Richard H. Riley where they discussed the ongoing military operations against extremist groups in Hirshabelle including al-Shabaab and the Islamic State in Somalia.

On 21 March, Somali President Hassan Sheikh Mohamud with the governor of Middle Shabelle Region, the former governor of that region, the governor of Yaaqshiid district in Mogadishu, military officers, and other officials conducted a meeting in the Adale District about accelerating the ongoing operation in HirShabelle with plans to attempt to eliminate al-Shabaab from Middle Shabelle before Eid al-Fitr.

On 28 March, the director of the National Security and Intelligence Agency, Abdullahi Mohamed Ali Sambaloolshe, accompanied by Hirshabelle Vice President Yusuf Ahmed Hagar Dabageed, held a meeting in the Moqokori District with the traditional elders of that district, with the meeting focused on strengthening security and accelerating operations against Al-Shabaab, especially in the Middle Shabelle region where operations against Al-Shabaab are underway. This was proceeded by former intelligence chief Fahad Yasin urged President Hassan Sheikh Mohamud to unite opposition politicians and convene a national forum to develop a unified counter-terrorism strategy. He stated his readiness to set aside political differences, offer advice, and demonstrate solidarity to combat terrorism. Fahad Yasin requested an open and unconditional forum for all parties to contribute to the country's safety, emphasizing the need for unity and putting aside divisive issues. On the same day, the Commander of the Somali Police Force, Brigadier General Asad Osman Abdullahi, and his deputy chaired a meeting to discuss accelerating the fight against Al-Shabaab and improving national security. The meeting reviewed security reports from across the country, discussing the successes and challenges in combating Al-Shabaab. The Commander thanked the public for their support and urged officers to act quickly on public information to counter Al-Shabaab's attacks.

On 30 March, Somali President Hassan Sheikh Mohamud is calling for national unity among political leaders, including rivals, to strengthen the fight against Al-Shabaab and advance Somalia's federal system. He emphasized the need for broad political consensus and inclusion in security and state-building efforts. This appeal comes amid tensions with federal member states and former presidents who have criticized the current administration's handling of elections, constitutional principles, and the war on Al-Shabaab. The call for unity follows recent military successes against Al-Shabaab but acknowledges the group's continued threat and the need for a unified counterterrorism strategy to combat the long-standing insurgency.

On 18 April, Former Somali Prime Minister Ali Mohammed Ghedi criticized the recent recapture of towns in Middle Shabelle by Al-Shabaab, calling it a national disgrace in a statement titled "Shame and Humiliation." Referring to six towns Gedi questioned why areas liberated two years ago were lost again, raising concerns about political failure, lack of strategy, and military shortcomings. He urged the federal government and the HirShabelle administration to develop a unified political, military, and defensive strategy to permanently defeat Al-Shabaab. Gedi warned that the militant group's return threatens infrastructure and development projects like hospitals, schools, mosques, and security centers. He called on all Somali regions and citizens to unite in combating Al-Shabaab and ISIS to ensure lasting peace and stability in Somalia. Somalia's Foreign Minister Ahmed Moalim Fiqi has strongly condemned Ambassador Sivuyile Thandikhaya Bam, the Acting Head of the African Union Transition Mission in Somalia, accusing him of sympathizing with Al-Shabaab. Fiqi claims Bam submitted misleading reports to international bodies, portraying the terrorist group in a favorable light, as seeking statehood and minimizing civilian harm, which the Minister denounced as a distortion of reality. Fiqi stated that Bam's actions show clear bias and undermine Somalia's fight against terrorism. As a result, the Somali government is seriously considering expelling Bam for what it views as a betrayal of trust. This controversy signals rising tensions between Somalia and the African Union over the role and direction of ATMIS, which was established to support Somalia's transition to stable security.

On 20 April, Professor Mohamed Haji Ingariis projected that al-Shabaab would likely take over Mogadishu and the federal government building, stating in an essay, that Hassan Sheikh Mohamud was acting "irritational" about the situation and that their chances of taking Mogadishu has increased since the Al-Shabaab take over the Adan-Yabal district of the Middle Shabelle region. Somali militia leader Cali Jeyte Cismaan proposed relocating the wives and children of al-Shabaab militants to areas controlled by the group. He argued that it is unacceptable for their families to live peacefully in government-held cities while militants continue their attacks. Jeyte emphasized he wasn't calling for violence against children, but wanted families moved so al-Shabaab feels the burden of their actions. He also condemned the group as worse than past colonial powers, accusing them of unjustified violence. He urged the Somali public to unite in fighting against al-Shabaab.

=== Military reactions ===
On 19 April, Somali President Hasan Sheikh Mohamud had a meeting with General Yusuf Odowaa Rage, the commander of the Somali National Army, and other officers, at Villa Somalia in Mogadishu following Al-Shabaab's recapture of the strategic town of Adan Yabal in central Somalia where Mohamud instructed the senior military leadership to immediately launch new operations to reclaim the town and other areas recently captured by Al-Shabaab.

On 25 April, the Intergovernmental Authority on Development (IGAD) urgently called for the rapid deployment of 8,000 additional peacekeepers and international funding for Somalia's AUSSOM mission due to a surge in Al-Shabaab attacks that have reversed recent progress. AUSSOM faced a $96 million funding shortfall, impacting logistics and resupply. Al-Shabaab's offensive worsened humanitarian conditions, displacing millions and disrupting essential services. The Kampala summit produced recommendations including troop deployment, expanded air support, local force recruitment, and strengthened coordination. IGAD also urged for regional logistical support and a donor summit.

== See also ==
- Constitutional crisis in Somalia
