= Hilowle Gaab attack =

2023 terrorist incident in Somalia

- Part of Somali Civil War (2009–present)
Date	January 6, 2023
Location	Hilowle Gaab, Somalia
Result	al-Shabaab tactical victory Somali strategic victory

Belligerents
Somalia; Ma'awisley	al-Shabaab

Casualties and losses
7+ killed and injured (per Somalia); 31 killed (per al-Shabaab)	Unknown

On January 6, 2023, al-Shabaab militants attacked the town of Hilowle Gaab, which had recently been recaptured by Somali forces. Over 20 people were killed in the attack, including several Somali commanders.

== Prelude ==
Somali forces launched an offensive against al-Shabaab in late 2022, with the aid of the Ma'awisley militia. The offensive captured several key towns and villages in Hirshabelle State, including Hilowle Gaab, which had been under al-Shabaab control for years prior. In late 2022, the Somali military captured Runirgod, the last major al-Shabaab stronghold in the region. That same week, Hilowle Gaab was captured. A day prior to the attack on Hilowle Gaab, al-Shabaab attacked the city of Mahas, killing over 35 people.

== Attack ==
The attack began at 5 am, when civilians were beginning their morning prayers. A Ma'awisley spokesperson stated that three car bombs were set off by the militants, and a three hour long battle ensued between Somali forces and Ma'awisley fighters against al-Shabaab. Five Somali commanders were killed in the attack, along with several Ma'awisley fighters and civilians. Many other Somali soldiers were wounded. Somali government and military officials claimed to have pushed al-Shabaab back into the forests near Hilowle Gaab after the attack.

== Aftermath ==
al-Shabaab claimed to have killed 31 Somali and Ma'awisley soldiers in the attack, along with capturing a base and scores of equipment. The Somali government declined to give a number of killed or injured on either side, although seven people were confirmed dead.
