= El Baraf =

Ceel baraf (El baraf) Ceel baraf Ceel Baraf
- town and district
- Donkey in El Baraf, 2016
- Nickname: Degmada Ceel baraf
- Location in Somalia.
- Coordinates: 3°12′26.2″N 45°45′31.5″E
- Country: Somalia
- State: Hirshabelle
- Region: Middle Shabelle
- Control: al-Shabaab

Area
  - Land: 2,808 km^{2} (1,084 sq mi)

Population (July, 2021)
  - Total: 101,630
- Time zone: UTC+3 (EAT)

Ceel baraf (El baraf) is a town and district in the Middle Shabelle, Somalia. It is a transportation hub at the junction of roads and had been effectively controlled by the Hirshabele until the 2025 Shabelle offensive.

== Inhabitants ==
The inhabitants are predominantly Agoonyar Gaabane, a branch of the Abgaal, a branch of the Hawiye clan. They are in conflict with the Hawaadle, another branch of the Hawiye clan, who live in a neighboring village.

== History ==
In June 2002, the forces of Muhammad Umar Habeb of the Warsangali clan attacked El Baraf. El Baraf was controlled by the warlords of Dahir Dayah, then Minister of Interior of the Transitional National Government of Somalia.

In February 2008, a struggle between Hawaadle and Abgaal, a branch of the Hawiye clan, set the stage for fighting in Qoryale and El Baraf. The clashes displaced hundreds of families and thousands of people. The inhabitants of the Hawaadle clan took refuge in Jalalaqsi and those of the Abgaal clan in Mahaday.

=== Ruling by Al-Shabaab ===
In June 2009, there was fighting in El Baraf between forces supporting the TFG government and Al-Shabaab, displacing the residents. For the next seven years, El Baraf was controlled by Al-Shabaab.

In March 2011, the Hawiye clan declared the establishment of the "CAWL Autonomous Region" centered on Sheekh Ibraahim Taajir (Sheekh Ibraahim Yare), which was described as consisting of five towns: Galcad (Galgudud region), Masaga-waa (Galgudud region), Budbud (Mudug region) Cigo (Galgdud region), and El Baraf (Central Sheberi region).

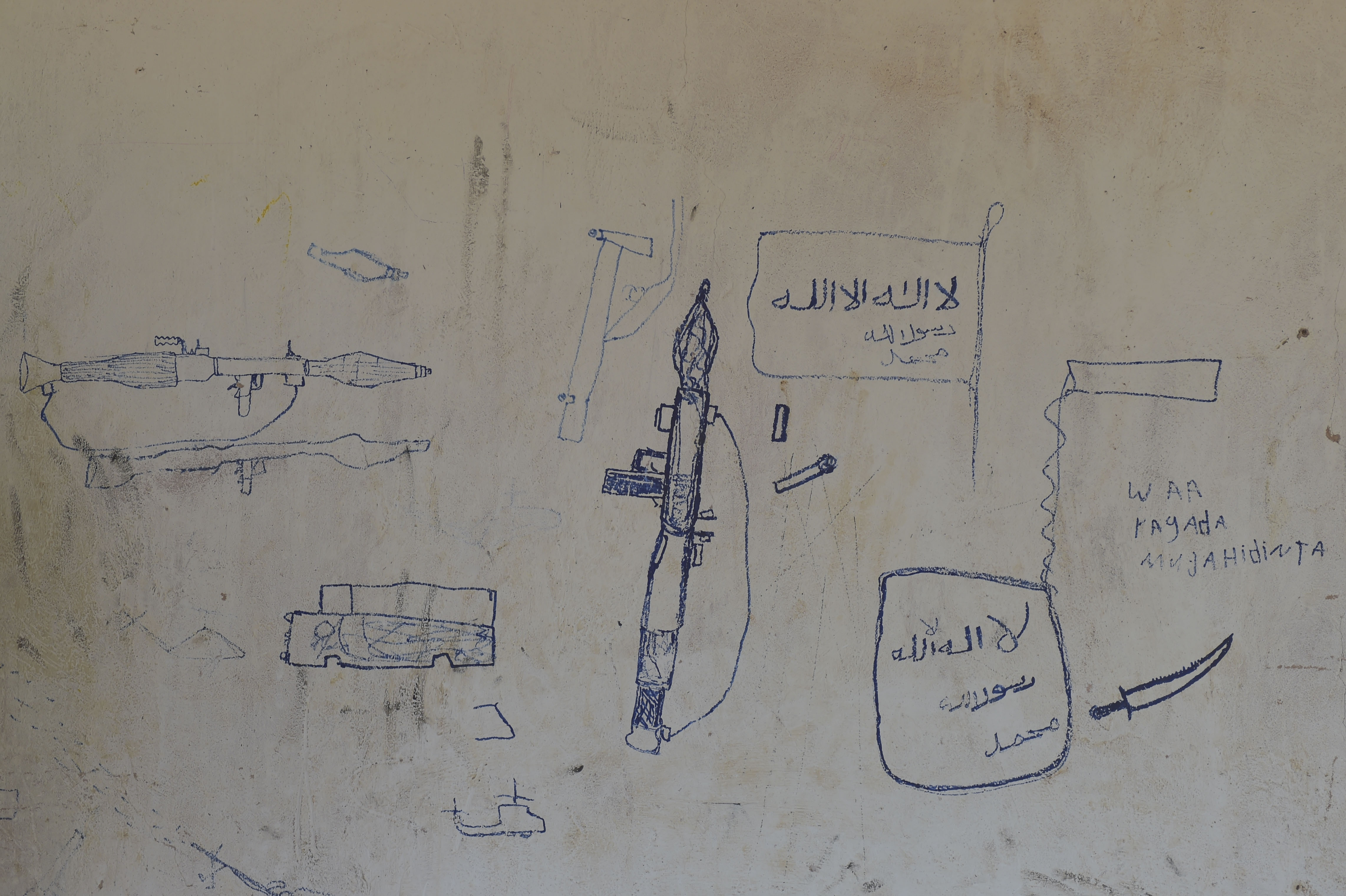
Drawings left by Al-Shabaab forces in a building in El-Baraf

In November 2011, al-Shabaab in El Buur fled and the Ethiopian army and moved in to El Baraf village and other areas.

=== Recapture by AMISOM ===
In February 2016, Somali government forces and AMISOM forces jointly took control of El Baraf village, which was previously controlled by al-Shabaab.

In October 2016, Al Shabaab destroyed El Baraf's wells. Many residents moved in search of water sources. Water shortages have triggered a decline in services such as healthcare and education, and AMISOM has requested international organizations and NGOs to provide clean water.

In November 2016, al-Shabaab attacked the AMISOM base in El Baraf.

In March 2017, Somali government forces arrested members of al-Shabaab in El Baraf.

In December 2018, more than 15 people died due to clan fighting. The struggle occurred between El Baraf and Jalalaqsi and is believed to have been caused by khat trading in Jowhar. The government of Hirshabelle State, a constituent of the Federal Republic of Somalia, held a meeting to mediate.

In September 2019, some 50 people from Alkowsar in the Adan Yabal district of the Middle Shabelle region returned to El Baraf as emissaries of al-Shabaab, where they were arrested and prohibited from contacting their relatives.

In October 2019, Somali government soldiers shot and killed a young man in El Baraf. The murdered man was the son of a well-known businessman. It was also reported that murders by Somali government soldiers are not uncommon.

In October 2020, three people, including a Somali military officer, were killed by a landmine near El Baraf.

In September 2021, al-Shabaab attacked the Burundi military base at El Baraf.

In May 2022, al-Shabaab attacked the Burundi military base at El Baraf. Al-Shabaab reportedly killed 170 AU soldiers, but the Burundi military reported 10 dead and 5 missing.

=== Recapture by al-Shabaab ===
On February 21, 2025, during the 2025 Shabelle offensive, al-Shabaab militants fought with Somali soldiers and the pro-government Ma’awisley Abgal clan militia killing 93 pro-government forces with the rest fleeing, leading El Baraf to ultimately fall to al-Shabaab.
