= Battle of Bal'ad (2025) =

Battle of the Shabelle offensive in Somalia

- Part of 2025 Shabelle offensive
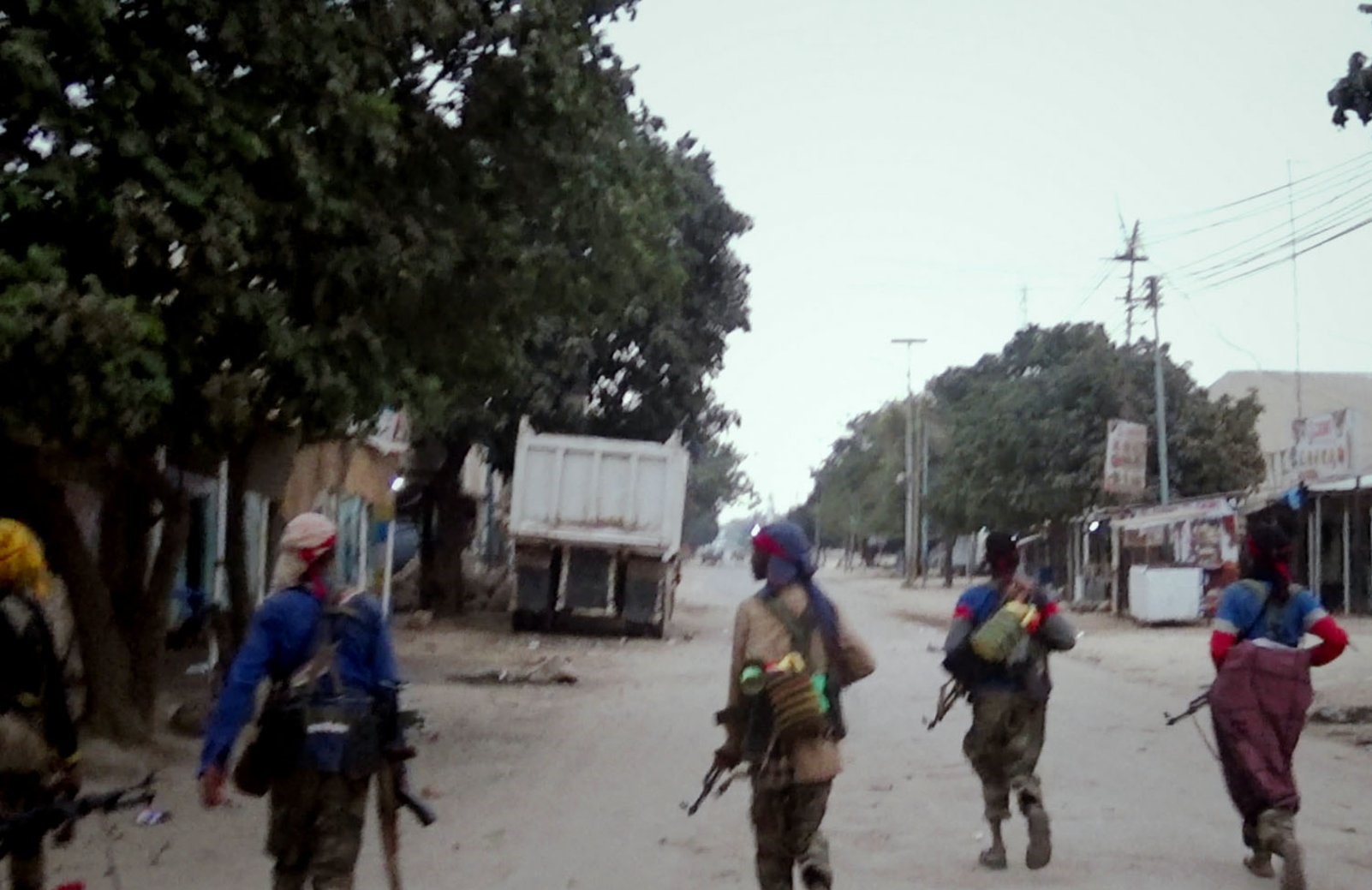
- Al-Shabaab fighters in Bal'ad, Somalia February 27
Date	February 27, 2025—February 28, 2025; 17 months ago
Location	Bal'ad, Somalia 2°21′30″N 45°23′11″E
Result	Al-Shabaab victory: Town falls under Al-Shabaab control

Belligerents
Somalia; Ma'awisley clans	Al-Qaeda; Al-Shabaab

Casualties and losses
~40 killed	Unknown

Battle of Bal'ad (Somali: Dagaalkii Balcad) was a battle during the 2025 Shabelle offensive in the Middle Shabelle between the Somali National Army and al-Shabaab.

== Battle ==
On February 26, al-Shabaab militants launched a coordinated assault on Bal'ad district, located in the Middle Shabelle region. The attackers entered the town from several different points. This led to intense combat between the al-Shabaab fighters and the Somali federal government’s security forces. Official government sources have claimed that they successfully repelled the attack; however, the exact number of deaths and injuries resulting from the fighting is still unknown. Al-Shabaab militants launched attacks targeting multiple military bases situated within the Bal'ad district. These attacks likely involved armed combat and aimed to inflict casualties, seize resources, or disrupt military operations in the area.

By February 27, Somali government forces retook control of Bal'ad after repelling the attack by Al-Shabaab militants who used roadside bombs and launched a full-scale assault, briefly seizing some areas. The government claims to have inflicted heavy casualties on the militants, with witness reports indicating dozens killed. The attack, part of the recent surge in Al-Shabaab activity in Middle Shabelle, underscores the group’s ongoing insurgency against the Somali government despite continued military offensives.

On February 28, Al-Shabaab launched another attack on Bal'ad, storming a Somali military base and briefly seizing control. The Somali government claims to have recaptured the town again and inflicted heavy losses on the militants, while Al-Shabaab claims to have killed 23 soldiers and seized military vehicles. Eyewitnesses reported seeing Al-Shabaab fighters patrolling Bal'ad, causing many residents to flee in fear. Though, later reports shown that al-Shabaab completely took over the town after the attacks.

== Aftermath ==
After successfully seizing control of the town from Somali government forces, al-Shabaab militants proceeded to release a significant number of prisoners incarcerated within the local prison system. This action likely served multiple purposes for the group, such as bolstering their ranks with new recruits, undermining the authority of the government, and creating an atmosphere of chaos and instability in the newly captured territory. The released prisoners, potentially including both petty criminals and individuals sympathetic to al-Shabaab’s cause, were then free to rejoin society or contribute to the group’s activities.
