= Jilyaale District =

Jilyaale District (Somali: Degmada Jiliyaale), also known as Jameeca Jilyaale, is an administrative district in the Middle Shabelle region of Hirshabelle, Somalia. It is named after Jilyaale, its administrative centre. The locality lies west of Jowhar in the Shabelle River valley.

On 4 November 2023, the Hirshabelle Council of Ministers approved the recognition of Jiliyaale as a district, following a proposal presented by the Ministry of Interior and Local Government. Jiliyaale was one of six localities included in the proposal, which stated that the areas had fulfilled the requirements for district status. The council approved the proposal by majority vote.
