= Awdheegle and Bariire attacks =

Somali civil war battle on 2 April 2021

- Part of Somali Civil War (2009–present)
Date	2 April 2021
Location	Awdheegle and Bariire, Lower Shabelle, Somalia
Result	Somali victory: Al-Shabaab briefly captures Bariire

Belligerents
Somalia	al-Shabaab

Casualties and losses
48 (per al-Shabaab and US); 14 killed (per Somalia)	76 killed, 10 captured (per Somalia)

On 2 April 2021, Al-Shabaab militants simultaneously attacked Somali National Army bases in Awdheegle and Bariire, Lower Shabelle, killing forty-eight soldiers and dozens of al-Shabaab fighters. Somali forces were able to repulse both attacks.

== Background ==
The Somali National Army (SNA) bases in Awdheegle and Bariire were built to protect several bridges that transported supplies to and from those cities and Mogadishu. The guards at the bases were also tasked with preventing suicide bombings. Awdheegle is a city on the outskirts of Mogadishu, and Bariire is in Lower Shabelle. While both cities are controlled by the SNA, much of the rural land surrounding the area is controlled or heavily under the influence of al-Shabaab.

== Attacks ==
The attacks began at 4 a.m. local time and occurred simultaneously in Awdheegle and Bariire. al-Shabaab drove suicide car bombs into the bases before launching infantry attacks on them. Lower Shabelle governor Abdulkadir Mohamed Nur Siidi stated that al-Shabaab began firing mortars on the villages of Saniid and Anole near Bariire, along with shelling the outskirts of Janaale. Sabiid, Anole, and Janaale were all under SNA control at the time of the attacks.

Somali soldiers were able to defend Awdheegle from the jihadists, but fighting in Bariire expanded into the town. Al-Shabaab claimed to have captured Bariire and the military base, although a Somali official stated that Bariire came under more pressure after al-Shabaab's loss at Awdheegle. Somali National Television claimed that the attacks on both Awdheegle and Bariire were repulsed, although Somali security forces later stated that the base at Bariire was recaptured later. Somali general Mohamed Tahlil Bihi stated that nine soldiers were killed and eleven injured although by April 6, military spokesman Odowaa Yusuf Rageh stated 14 Somali soldiers were killed.

Bihi stated that 76 al-Shabaab fighters were killed and ten others had been captured, and al-Shabaab spokesman Sheikh Abdulaziz al-Musab stated that 47 Somali soldiers were killed. al-Musab did not give a death toll for al-Shabaab fighters. The United States Department of State later stated at least 48 Somali soldiers had been killed.

== Aftermath ==
Somali Prime Minister Mohamed Hussein Roble visited wounded soldiers from the Awdheegle and Bariire attacks on April 6 at a military hospital in Mogadishu. He congratulated the soldiers for their bravery. Somali state media also said that operations were underway that same day to chase remaining al-Shabaab militants from the areas around Awdheegle, and that the Somali military was currently looking for the perpetrators of the Bariire attack.
