= Battle of Runirgod =

2022 battle of the Somali Civil War

- Part of Somali Civil War (2009–present)
Date	December 12–22, 2022
Location	Runirgod District, Middle Shabelle, Somalia
Result	Somali National Army victory

Belligerents
Somali Army: Macawisley	al-Shabaab

Casualties and losses
4+ (per al-Shabaab)	150 killed (per Somali Army)

The battle of Runirgod took place between December 12 and December 22, 2022, with Somali forces launching an offensive against al-Shabaab in the Runirgod District of Middle Shabelle, the group's last stronghold in the state.

== Prelude ==
In late 2022, the Somali Army began a series of campaigns against Al-Shabaab, a jihadist militant group that has led an insurgency in the country since the formation of a functioning Somali government in 2009. The offensives began as a result of newly elected Somali president Hassan Sheikh Mohamud's crackdown on the group, and increasingly deadly attacks on civilian and military centers. The main area of operations for these offensives was Hirshabelle and Middle Shabelle states, north of the capital Mogadishu. Runirgod, also called Ruunnirgood, was a major al-Shabaab hub in Middle Shabelle state, having been controlled by the group since 2016.

== Battle ==
The battle for Runirgod, and its surrounding district, began on December 12, when Somali troops liberated the village of al-Kowthar, just north of Runirgod district. From there, Somali forces and an allied militia, the Macawisley, penetrated southwards into Runirgod district, capturing the town of Daarunimoo. By the morning of December 18, Somali forces had captured the hamlets of Harerigi Ali Ahmed, Lebi Ad, and El-Bad. The following morning, clashes broke out again in Daarunimoo, as al-Shabaab fighters attempted to recapture the town. al-Shabaab also captured el-Bad later on December 18. On December 19, al-Shabaab forces retreated to rural areas of Galgaduud region and the eastern parts of Runirgod district.

Somali forces claimed on December 22 that they captured the town of Runirgod, the capital of Runirgod district, around 6am. Army spokesman claimed they killed 150 al-Shabaab fighters in the operation, five of whom were foreign. While al-Shabaab did not claim to have retreated, they did claim the deaths of four Somali soldiers in a bomb attack in the district. Following the liberation of Runirgod, all major towns in Middle Shabelle state were under the control of the Somali Army.

== Aftermath ==
On December 24, Somali troops attacked El-Bad again, which was still under the control of al-Shabaab. An unnamed Somali military official claimed Somali forces took casualties, although captured the town.
