= Hassan Mohamed Ali Wariiri =

Somali judge

Hassan Mohamed Ali (Wariiri)حسن محمد علي

Benadir Regional Court President of Appeal Court

Personal details
- Born: 1 July 1943 (age 83) Mogadishu, British-occupied Somaliland
- Party: Independent
- Education: Somali National University

Hassan Mohamed Ali Wariiri (Somali: Xasan Maxamed Cali Wariiri, Arabic: حسن محمد علي) (born July 1, 1943, in Mogadishu, Somalia) is a judge, currently a judge of the Appeal Court.

== Background ==
Wariiri was born in 1943 in Mogadishu, Somalia. He is from Balad District (now part of the Middle Shabelle Region).

Wariiri is multilingual, speaking Somali, Arabic, Italian and English.
