= Masaajid Cali Guduud =

Masaajid Cali Guduud is a district in the Middle Shabelle region of Somalia. The district is home to many villages including Darasalaam, Tawakal, Towfiq, Geedi-xeyr, Hassan-geedi, Qahira, Maxa-siid, Xagarey, Faqayale, Al-Furqaan, Ceel-barwaqo and many others.

== History ==
During the Somali civil war, Al-Shabaab has attacked the district multiple times. The district was under control of al-Shabaab in 2022 until Somali Federal Government Military Forces and local forces known as the Mawisleyda took the area back. On March 26, 2025, the district came under the control of al-Shabaab during the 2025 Shabelle offensive.
