= Mahaday Attack =

The Mahaday Attack began on April 1 until April 6, 1924, near Mahaday, Italian Somaliland. This episode, known as the Mahaddei Attack, was part of the anti-colonial struggles of the Italian-Somali territories during this period.

== Another event ==
As part of hit and run strategy to liberate Mahaday from Italy, on March 12, 1912, three natives of the Gaalje'el saw an isolated askari (soldier) in the vicinity of Mahaddei, they began to discuss among themselves the possibility of attacking the askari, and decision was made. they approached him, wounding him with two stab wounds and robbing him of his rifle, and flee the area.
