= Hilowle Gaab =

Village in Somalia

- Location in Somalia.
- Coordinates: 3°39′5″N 46°51′35″E
- Country: Somalia
- Regional State: Hirshabelle State
- Region: Middle Shabelle
- District: Runirgod District
- Elevation: 76 m (249 ft)

Hilowle Gaab is a village in the north of Runirgod District, Hirshabelle State, Somalia. It is located on a road that connects Hamar and Ceeldher. The town is close to the dunes of Geesocawlo and Buuraha Hiyilka.

== History ==
The village had come under al-Shabaab control sometime before 2023. In January 2023, the Somali government recaptured the village from al-Shabaab, leading the group to retaliate in an attack that killed six Somali soldiers and militiamen. Both al-Shabaab and the Somali government claimed control of the village after the attack. al-Shabaab recaptured Hilowle Gaab in August 2023.
