= Gulane =

Gulane Guulane
- Town
- Location in Somalia
- Coordinates: 3°18′N 46°14′E
- Country: Somalia
- Region: Middle Shabelle

Government
  - Control: Al-Shabaab
- Time zone: UTC+3 (EAT)

Gulane (Somali: Guulane) is a town in the southeastern Middle Shabelle (Shabeellaha Dhexe) region of Somalia. It is the town where many Macawisley, a name for local volunteers for war against Shabab call home, including one of the most famous leaders of this volunteer group called Hibad Ali Dasar, who died while fighting against Shabab in Middle Shabelle.

== Somali Civil War ==
On 19 March 2025 Al-Shabaab captured Gulane town, lifting a three-year-long siege on its strongholds in the central regions of Galgadud and Mudug.
