= Ibrahim Sheikh Muhyadin Addow =

Somali military general

Major General Ibrahim Sheikh Muhyadin Addow
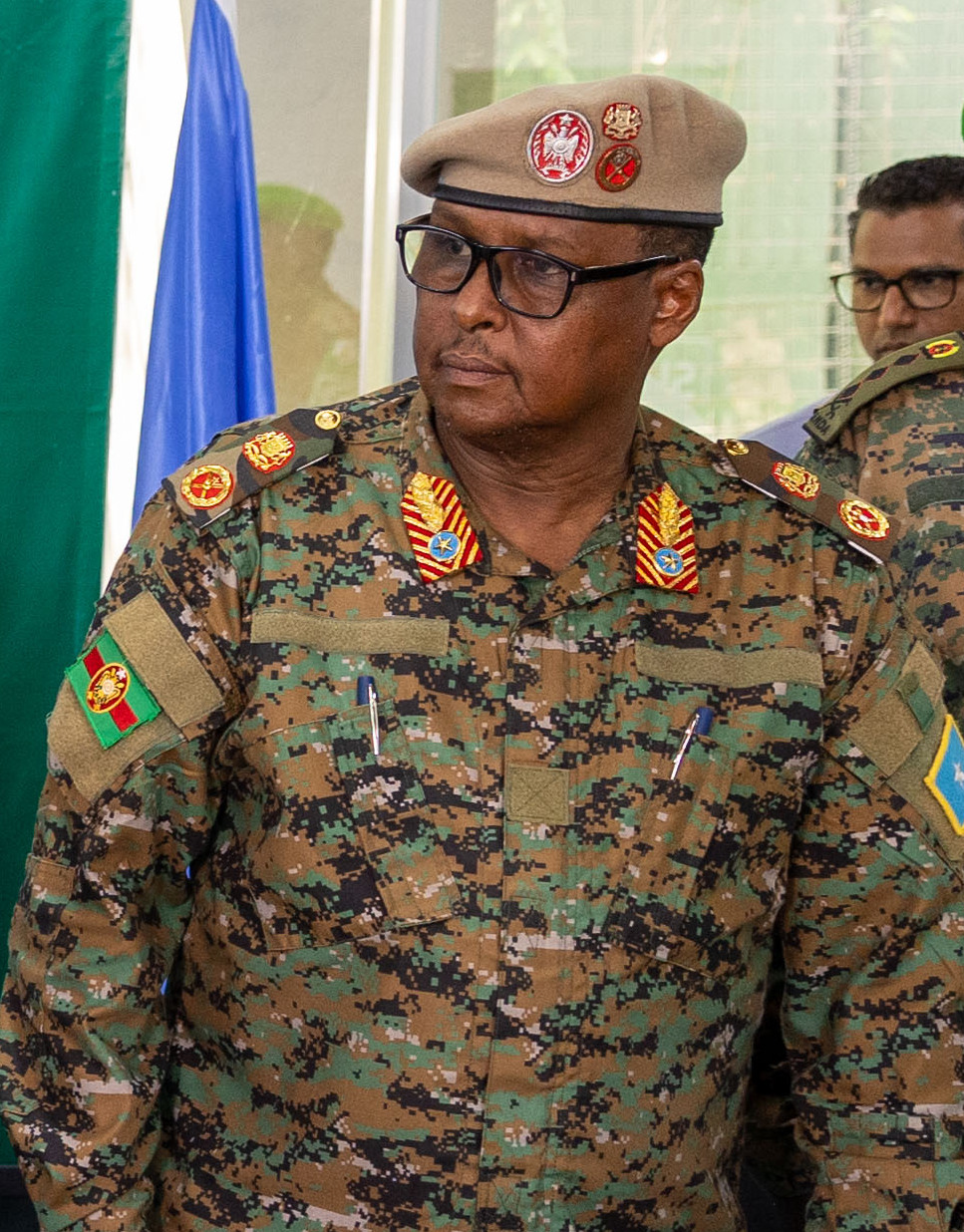
- Addow in 2024

Chief of Defence Force
- In office 19 June 2023 – 9 November 2024
- Preceded by: Odowaa Yusuf Rageh
- Succeeded by: Odowaa Yusuf Rageh

Personal details
- Born: 1960 (age 65–66) Mogadishu, Somalia

Military service
- Allegiance: Somalia
- Branch/service: Somali National Army
- Years of service: 1984–present
- Rank: Major general

Major General Ibrahim Sheikh Muhyadin Addow (born in 1960 Mogadishu, Somalia) is a Somali military general and former Chief of Defence Force Somali Armed Forces.

== Personal life ==
Major General Ibrahim Sheikh Muhyadin Addow was born in Mogadishu in 1960. He received his primary and secondary education at Hamar Jadid Primary and Secondary School in Mogadishu in 1977.

In 1981, he received his high school certificate from Wajir High School in Mogadishu.

In the same year, 1981, he joined the training of officers at the Somali National Army Academy in Mogadishu and received his commission as Second Lieutenant in 1982.

In 1984, he graduated from Academy and received the rank of First Lieutenant.

In 1986, he received junior staff college leadership training at the Somali National Army Academy and was promoted to the rank of Captain.

In 1990, he took advanced training and was promoted to the rank of Major.

In the same year 1990, he graduated from the Language Institute of the Somali National Army.

== Career ==
During the collapse and the Somali Civil War 1987-c2000, he worked as a commissioned officer in various sections of the Somali National Army, eventually reaching the rank of major.

He was also one of the athletes on the Wagad team.

In 2001, he worked as security advisor with the Transitional Government and was promoted to lieutenant colonel.

In 2008, he was promoted as colonel and became the chairman of the committee for the security of the regional council of the Benadir region.

In 2012–2014, he was the head of protocol for the President of Somalia, Hassan Sheikh Mohamud.

In 2014, he was promoted to the rank of Brigadier General and became the Commander of the Presidential Battalion, Battalion 60.

In 2023, he was promoted to the rank of Major general and appointed Chief of Defence Force of the Somali National Army. On 9 November 2024 he was replaced with his predecessor Odowaa Yusuf Rageh.

== Promotions ==
Rank with Insignia in English and Somali	Year of Promotion	Notes
Second Lieutenant (Xaddigle)	1982	
First Lieutenant (laba-Xiddigle)	1984	
Captain (Dhamme)	1986	
Major (Gashaanle)	1990	
Lieutenant Colonel (Gashaanle sare)	2001	
Colonel (Gashaanle Dhexe)	2008	
Brigadier General (Sareeye Guuto)	2014	
Major General (Sareeye Gaas)	2019	
