= Mahaday District =

Mahaday
- District
- Country: Somalia
- Region: Middle Shebelle
- Capital: Mahaday
- Time zone: UTC+3 (EAT)

Mahaday District is a district of the Middle Shebelle region of Somalia. Its capital lies at Mahaday.
