= Elasha Biyaha =

Mogadishu suburb

Elasha Biyaha Ceelasha Biyaha
- Town
- Location within Somalia
- Coordinates: 2°04′56.4″N 45°12′36.7″E
- Country: Somalia
- State: South West
- Region: Lower Shabelle
- District: Afgooye
- Control: (Al-Shabaab (militant group)) South West

Population (2007)
  - Total: 24,500
- Time zone: UTC+3 (EAT)

Elasha Biyaha (Somali: Ceelasha Biyaha) is a suburb located in the Lower Shabelle region of Somalia, approximately 16 kilometers northwest of Mogadishu.

== Overview ==
Elasha Biyaha is situated on the northwestern outskirts of Mogadishu, nestled between Afgooye and the capital city. The area is 10 km from Mogadishu, measuring from Ex-Control Afgooye. The name Ceelasha Biyaha literally means "The Water Wells" in Somali, which encapsulates the area's significance, intimately linked to a primary well that sustained the settlers with its water source. The area holds importance due to its proximity to major urban centers.

The area was uninhabited before the Somali Civil War, only consisting of the Somali Water Agency, built by the German government in 1978. After the Ethiopian invasion of Somalia in 2006 the area became heavily populated as waves of people fleeing urban fighting fled to Elasha Biyaha establishing a refugee camp there.

Elasha Biyaha has two large markets; the "second" Bakara market and the Safa and Marwa market. The first was established in 2007 as people from Mogadishu fled the Ethiopian war, while the other was established after the area became a formal settlement. Approximately 90% of the vegetables and other fresh produce supplied to Mogadishu come from Afgooye and Lower Shabelle, passing through Elasha Biyaha.

The suburb is home to two of the largest military bases in Somalia; Siinka-Dheer base, one of the main headquarters of the Somali National Army (SNA), responsible for securing Mogadishu.and Arbacow base, originally established by ATMIS but later handed over to Somalia's Gorgor unit.

On March 18, 2025, al-Shabaab captured the suburb during the Shabelle offensive.

== Demographics ==
According to the UNHCR, in 2007 Elasha Biyaha had an estimated population of 24,500, comprising 20 percent men, 35 percent women, and 45 percent children.
