= Moqokori =

Moqokori District Muuqa Dhaayaha Maqal Koris
- Town
- Nickname: Muuqa Dhaayaha
- Interactive map of Moqokori District
- Country: Somalia (De jure) (Al-Shabaab (militant group)) Islamic Emirate of Somalia (De facto)
- State: Hirshabelle
- Region: Hiiraan
- District: Moqokori

Government
  - Control: al-Shabaab
- Time zone: UTC+3 (EAT)

Moqokori is a town in Hiiraan, Somalia and capital of the Moqokori District.

The town is located approximately 80 kilometers southeast of Bulo Burte.

== History ==
On July 7, 2025, Al-Shabaab militants recaptured the town after losing it in September 2022, following a local uprising led by Ma'awisley fighters. After heavy fighting Somali National Army and Ma’awisley fighters lost control over the town with Al-Shabaab claiming that they killed at least 40 soldiers.

== Notable people ==
- Abdullahi Mohamed Ali, politician
- Yusuf Ahmed Hagar Dabageed, politician
- Ali Ibrahim Abdi [cali jilibey] Businessman
- Xuseen Maalin weeliye (xuseen kumande)a traditional elder
