= Odowaa Yusuf Rageh =

Somali military general (born 1987)

Major General Odowa Yussuf Raage
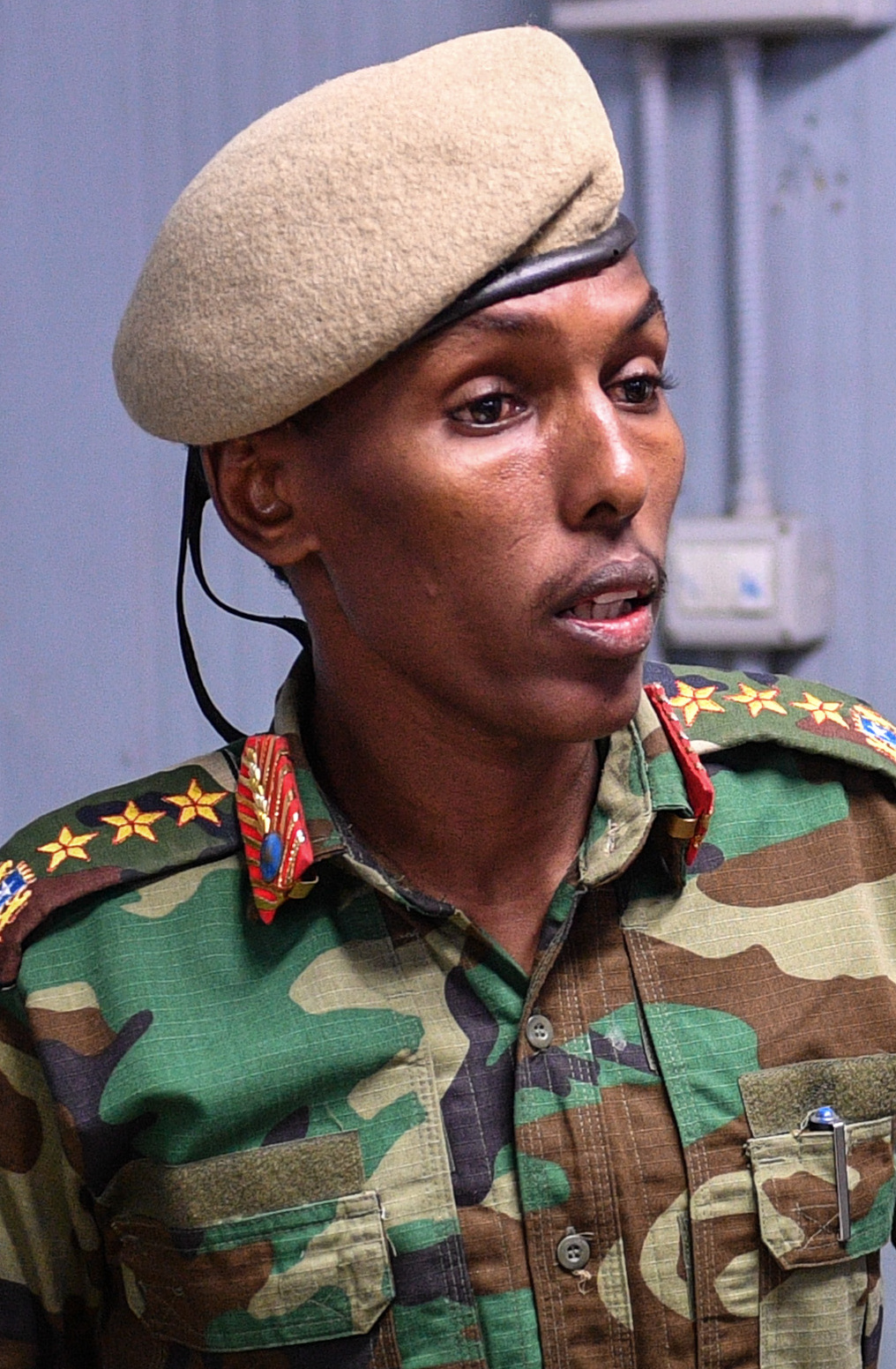

22nd & 24th Chief of Defence Force
- In office 9 November 2024 – 29 January 2026
- President: Hassan Sheikh Mohamud
- Preceded by: Ibrahim Sheikh Muhyadin Addow
- Succeeded by: Ibrahim Mohamed Mohamud
- In office 27 August 2020 – 19 June 2023
- President: Mohamed Abdullahi Farmajo (2020–2022); Hassan Sheikh Mohamud (2022–2023)
- Preceded by: Dahir Adan Elmi
- Succeeded by: Ibrahim Sheikh Muhyadin Addow

Personal details
- Born: 14 April 1987 (age 39) Mahaday, Middle Shabelle, Somalia

Military service
- Allegiance: Somalia
- Branch/service: Somali National Army
- Years of service: 2007–present
- Rank: Major General
- Commands: Chief of Defence Force
- Battles/wars: War in Somalia (2006–2009); Somali Civil War (2009–present)

Odowa Yussuf Raage (born 14 April 1987) is a Somali military officer who has served as the Chief of Defence Force of Somalia from November 2024 to January 2026. He previously served in the same position from August 2020 to June 2023.

== Career ==
After finishing his secondary school education in 2000, Raage enlisted in the Somali Army under the Transitional Federal Government. Shortly after enlisting Rageh was sent to Uganda for military training specifically VIP Protection. Once he was back in the country, he went on to provide basic training for new recruits.

In the year 2009, Raage was sent to Sudan for Officer training and came back in 2010 to be promoted as a First lieutenant. Upon commission, he became one of the Officers in charge of Villa Somalia Protection.

In 2013, Raage was sent to Turkey for special training that involved infantry commanding, foreign languages, and logistics of the Army. Shortly after coming back, He was then again sent back to Army War Institute in Turkey in the end of 2014 where he spent the next two years learning and understanding the core principles of leading a modern army. Before he was sent to Turkey, Raage was given the rank of Major.

Upon successfully completing his course at the Turkish Army War College, Raage was appointed as head of 60th Platoon which was part of the Villa Somalia Protection.

August 2018, he was appointed to be the deputy commander of the Somali National Army and was promoted to the rank of Brigadier general, in 2020, he became Commander in Chief of the Somali National Army.

Rageh survived an assassination attempt in July 2020. By the first quarter of 2023, Raage was promoted to the rank of Major General.

During June 2023, Rageh was replaced as commander in chief of the Somali National Army by Major General Ibrahim Sheikh Muhyadin Addow. In November 2024, Raage was reinstated as commander in chief of the Somali National Army.

== Promotions ==
Rank with Insignia in English and Somali	Year of Promotion	Notes
Second Lieutenant (Xiddigle)	2007	
First Lieutenant (Laba Xiddigle)	2010	
Captain (Dhamme)	2012	
Major (Gaashaanle)	2014	
Lieutenant Colonel (Gaashaanle Dhexe)	2016	
Colonel (Gaashaanle Sare)	2018	
Brigadier General (Sareeye Guuto)	2020	
Major General (Sareeye Gaas)	2023	

== Chief of Army ==
On 27 August 2020, Brigadier General Odowa Yussuf Raage was appointed as the Commander in Chief of the Somali National Army

On 19 June 2023, Odowa Yussuf Raage was replaced by the Somali cabinet and Major General Ibrahim Sheikh Muhyadin Addow was selected as new Chief of the Somali National Army.

On 9 November 2024, He was once again appointed as the Commander in Chief of the Somali National Army. On 29 January 2026, Rageh was removed from the position by the Somali Cabinet and was succeeded by Brigadier General Ibrahim Mohamed Mohamud.
