= Moqokori District =

- District
- Country: Somalia
- Region: Hiiraan
- Capital: Moqokori

Area
  - Total: 2.3 sq mi (6 km^{2})

Population
  - Total: 10,000
- Time zone: UTC+3 (EAT)

Moqokori District is a district of Hiiraan, Somalia. Its capital is Moqokori.

== History ==
The Moqokori area was elevated to district level by the Hirshabelle cabinet on the 4th of June 2023.
