= Awdheegle =

Awdheegle Awdheegle
- District
- Location in Somalia.
- Coordinates: 01°58′N 044°50′E
- Country: Somalia
- Region: Lower Shabelle

Government
  - Control: al-Shabaab

Population (2020)
  - Total: 119,000
- Time zone: UTC+3 (EAT)

Awdheegle (also Awdhegle) is a district in the Lower Shabelle region in southern Somalia.

== Demographics ==
Awdheegle is an agricultural district located west of Mogadishu on the Shebelle River.

Awdheegle is predominantly inhabited by the Begedi clan sub-division of the wider (Digil) family, who are native to South West.

== Somali Civil War ==
On 15 March 2025, as part of the Shabelle offensive, Al-Shabaab captured the town, killing 31 Somali Army soldiers.
