= Runirgod District =

Ruunnirgood
- District
- Location in Somalia.
- Coordinates: 3°33′35″N 46°46′33″E
- Country: Somalia
- State: Hirshabelle
- Region: Middle Shabelle

Government
- Time zone: UTC+3 (EAT)

Ruunnirgood is a district in the Northeastern Middle Shabelle (Shabeellaha Dhexe) region of Somalia. The district is about 220 km (136.70 mi) from Mogadishu. It is the eastern most district of the region bordering the El Dher District of Galguduud in the east, Adale District in the southeast, Adan Yabal District in the west and the Indian Ocean in the east. Its economy is largely based on animal husbandry and farming.
