= Ma'awisley =

Pro-government clan-based militias in central Somalia

- Macawisley
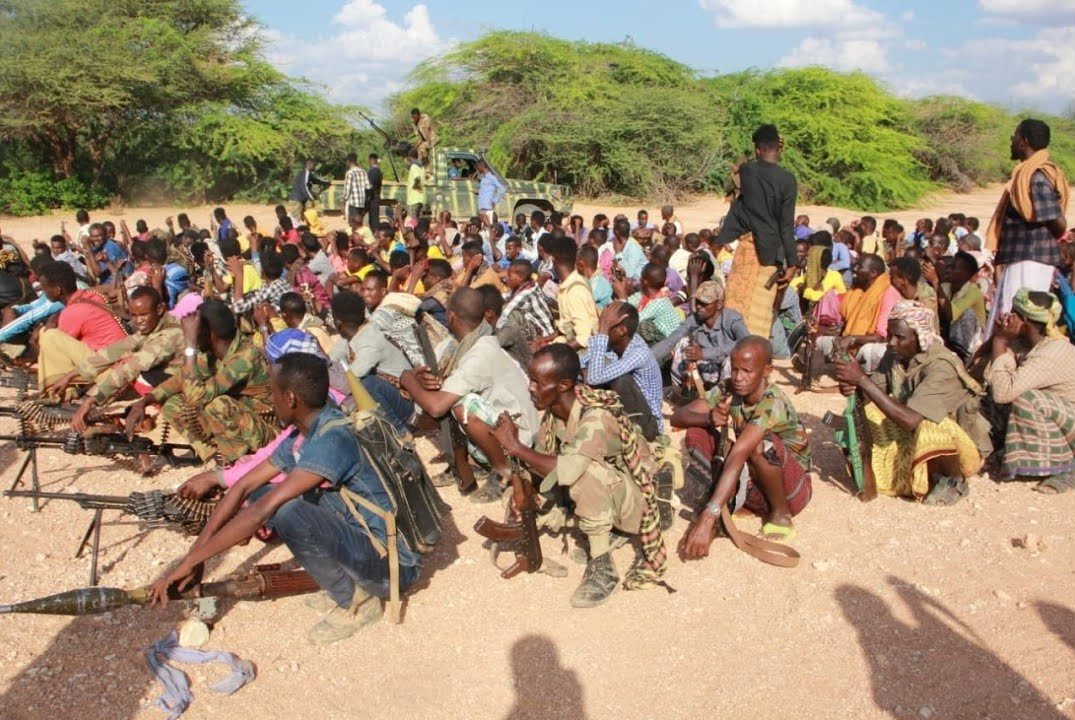
- Hawadle Ma'awisley in Beer-Haane, Hiran
- Leader: Ali Jeyte
- Dates active: 2014–present
- Groups: Mainly Hawadle; Also Abgaal, Gaalje'el, Habar Gidir, Murusade, Surre
- Headquarters: Central Somalia
- Active regions: Hirshabelle, Galmudug
- Size: 8,000–10,000

Ma'awisley (Somali: Macawiisleey) are a collection of clan-based militias based in central Somalia, primarily active in the states of Hirshabelle and Galmudug. Formed as a grassroots response to the militant group al-Shabaab, they have emerged as a critical, albeit controversial, force in Somalia’s counter-insurgency efforts. Their role has expanded significantly since 2022, with the Somali government increasingly relying on them to reclaim territories under al-Shabaab control.

== Overview ==
Named after sarongs (ma'awis) that the militia fighters wear, the Ma'awisley (lit. "The Wearers of Ma'awis") originated as loosely organized community defense groups in rural central Somalia, spontaneously mobilizing organically to resist al-Shabaab’s excessive demands for taxation and recruits. The Ma'awisley are primarily made up of farmers and herders, with most of them having no prior formal military training, and number about 8,000-10,000 fighters. Their efforts gained structure through government support, including funding and coordination with official forces. The militias are predominantly composed of members from local clans, including the Hawadle, Abgal, Gaalje'el Habar Gidir, Murusade and Surre. The Ma’awisley reportedly received weapons from the Ethiopian and the Somali federal government.

Ma'awisley groups first appeared in Jubaland and Hiran region in 2014 and have waxed and waned. However, a significant formation occurred in 2018 in central Somalia, led by Hibaad Ali Dasar from Gulane in Middle Shabelle, who organized about 60 men to fight al-Shabab after refusing taxes. Despite initial clashes from May to August 2018, they were defeated by October, with Dasar killed in an ambush. Ma'awisley militias also clashed with Al-Shabaab militants in the Adan Yabaal district of Middle Shabelle region in June 2019. Their resistance inspired further mobilizations, notably in Hiran and Galmudug, with a successful defense in Bahdo in June 2022, killing up to 70 al-Shabab fighters, with Hawadle Ma'awisley units liberating all Hawadle clan territory in Hiran from al-Shabaab.

In 2022 the Somali government started arming Ma'awisley militias to fight Al-Shabaab, specifically militias from Hassan Sheikh Mohamud’s clan and others close to him. It also encouraged other clans in central Somalia to mobilise volunteer fighters. The Somali government has designated the Ma'awisley as a primary force in its offensive against al-Shabaab, particularly in Phase One operations east of the Shabelle River in Hirshabelle and Galmudug, with their local knowledge and agility enabling tactical successes, such as the February 2025 offensive in El Buur, where they disrupted al-Shabaab strongholds. The government shifted its strategy to prioritize Ma'awisley-led operations over conventional military approaches. The government has also played a coordinating role, with Somalian president Hassan Sheikh Mohamud establishing Dhusamareb as an interim command center in August 2023 and engaging with local clans.

This engagement has however led to divisions, such as within the Hawadle clan, where there was increasing concern that key federal government figures were exploiting the offensive for political gain (which led the governor of Hiran region, Ali Jayte, to challenge pro-government actors) and the Murusade clan split over government involvement, with some opposing due to blocked supplies in February 2024. In north Galmudug, the Somali National Army (SNA) secured the villages to support the Ma'awisley clan militia present. But when Ma'awisley withdrew following a land dispute between their leadership and Somali president Hassan Sheikh Mohamud, the SNA was too weak to remain on its own and was forced to withdraw as well. In May 2024, Ma'awisley forces clashed with US-trained Danab units in El Baraf, Middle Shabelle, after Danab allegedly attempted to disarm local Ma'awisley forces in the town. In February 2024, Ma'awisley militias in Diinlaawe executed three brothers, accusing them of spying for Al-Shabaab. On 28 January the chief of Somalia's military court, Hassan Ali Nur (Shuute), revealed that human rights abuses committed by the Ma'awisley militias surged by 11%, including attacks on government security forces. The militias have also been accused of terrorising civilians in liberated areas, settling old scores linked to territorial disputes and control over grazing land, as well as illegal roadblocks for extortion.

Whereas Ahlu Sunnah wal-Jama'ah, a similar allied paramilitary group, was integrated into Galmudug State's police force, the various Ma'awisley units are not integrated and operate independently. On 7 February 2025 however, Somalia's Minister of Defence Omar Ali Abdi announced that the official integration of Ma'awisley militia forces into the Somali National Army (SNA) is underway, with the registration and training of volunteer fighters already in progress.

== See also ==
- Sahwa, similar phenomenon in Iraq during the 2006-2008 Iraqi Civil War.
