= Jilyaale =

Somalian District

Coordinates: 2°47′39″N 45°37′44″E

Jilyaale (Arabic: جليالي) is a district located west of Jowhar in the administrative region of Shabeellaha Hoose of Somalia.

It was founded by the Somali cleric Sheikh Hassan Barsane, who led a revolt against fascist Italian forces in Somalia, and the city was also his largest stronghold.
