= Adale District =

Adale
- District
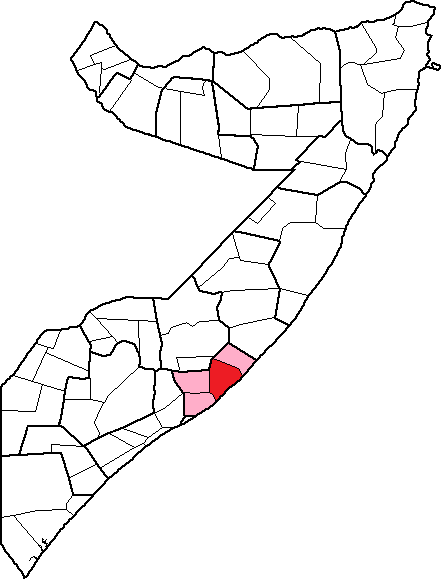
- Country: Somalia
- Region: Middle Shabelle
- Capital: Adale
- Time zone: UTC+3 (EAT)

Adale District (Somali: Degmada Cadale) is a district in the southeastern Middle Shabelle (Shabeellaha Dhexe) region of Somalia. Its capital lies at Adale.
