= Mahaday =

- Town
- Location in Somalia
- Coordinates: 02°58′13.6″N 45°31′49.3″E
- Country: Somalia
- Region: Middle Shabelle
- District: Mahaday

Population
  - Total: 209.381
- Time zone: UTC+3 (EAT)

Mahaday (Somali: Mahadaay) is a town in the southwestern Middle Shabelle (Shabeellaha Dhexe) region of Somalia.

== Overview ==
Mahaday is located about 118 km north of Mogadishu, the nation's capital.

It is located along the Shebelle River.

== Demographics ==
Mahaday has a population of around 35,000 inhabitants.
