= Balad District, Somalia =

Balcad
- Town
- Nickname: Taytayley
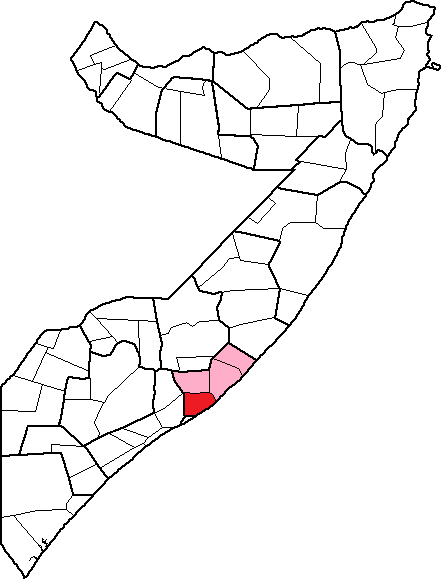

- Location in Somalia
- Coordinates: 2°39′N 45°3′E
- Country: Somalia, Hirshabeelle State
- Region: Middle Shabelle
- District: Balcad

Government
  - Mayor: Qaasim Furdug

Population (2021)
  - Total: 1,000,000
- Time zone: UTC+3 (EAT)
- Daadir, 10 October 2008

Bal'ad District (Somali: Degmada Balcad) is one of the districts of Middle Shabelle region of Somalia. It is located about 36 kilometers northeast of the capital city of Mogadishu. The district is an area of 4,400 square kilometres (1,700 sq miles) with an estimated population of 643,000 and 82 villages.

The district passes one of the Somalia's permanent rivers (Shabelle) which passes through the city of Bal-ad, nevertheless neighbours the Indian Ocean and has a long coast of about 70 km. The district is famous for agriculture, livestock and marine resources.

== Nature Reserve ==
Bal'ad has one of the many nature reserves of the country which is located on the eastern bank of the Shabelle River, immediately south of the town. It has been established by the Somali Ecological Society in 1985, at which that time covered an area of 42 ha and later extended to 190 ha in 1987. The site consists of one of the few patches of riverine forest remaining on the Shabelle River and the surrounding scrub savannah.

The principal trees of the riverine forest include Acacia elatior, Ficus sycamorus, Garcinia livingstonei, Mimusops fruticosa and Tamarindus indica, while the surrounding scrub consists of more stunted Acacia nilotica with a dense undergrowth of herbs and tall grasses.

The reserve included a field-centre which, from 1985 to 1990, burning, cutting and grazing within the site was controlled and there were some signs of recovery of the forest and an increase in wildlife populations.

== Ports ==
The natural ports of Ceel Macaan and Ceel Cadde which located in the district were the main gates for the incoming and out going goods of Somalia, likewise Cisiley airport during the decade and half, when Mogadishu air and seaport were closed.

== Industry ==
The Somalitex factory, whose 154 automated looms work 14 hours a day, turning out nearly 14 million meters (about 15 million yards) of cloth annually the Factory employed three thousand workers. The Somalitex futas vary in thickness, colour, and design and most shops in the marketplace stock them as well as the imported polyesters. The latter, although impractical in the tropical heat, easily torn and expensive, seem to have captured the taste of Somali women by their bright patterns and varied textures.

Given the ideal climate for cotton plantation in Balcad, The state-owned textile plants at Balcad could supply the local market (now not operating). Textiles are produced at the SOMALTEX plant in Balcad which supplies virtually the entire domestic market. Balcad Textile Factory was later upgraded and funded by West Germany. SOMALITEX facilities were greatly expanded. It is considered among the best equipped textile plant in Africa. The investment in cotton showed fewer long-term results than the investment in bananas.

The Administration of Balcad District of the Middle Shabelle Region supported by the Somali Federal Government encourage the local and foreign investment in the Region.
