= Adan Yabal District =

Adan Yabal mejegin Adebal
- ceel dheere Ceel muluq District
- Nickname: guulane
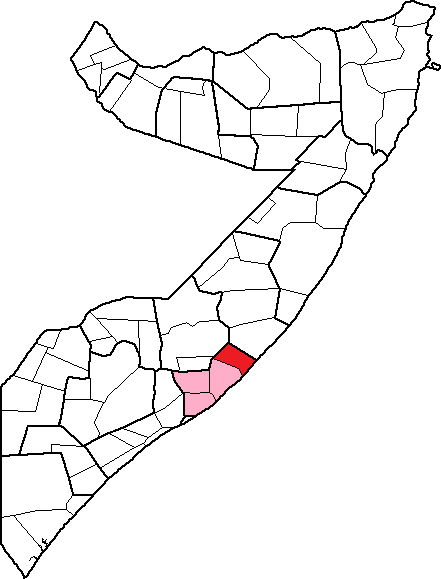
- Coordinates: 3.778543°N 46.246055°E
- Country: Somalia
- Region: Middle Shabelle

Government
  - Control: al-Shabaab
- Time zone: UTC+3 (EAT)

Adan Yabal District (Somali: Degmada Aadan Yabaal) is a district in the southeastern Middle Shabelle (Shabeellaha Dhexe) region of Somalia. Adan Yabaal was established in 1942.

== History ==
SNA forces and Ma'awisley militia captured Adan Yabal from Al-Shabaab in 2022. On 16 April 2025, Al-Shabaab seized the town from the government forces.
