= Middle Shabelle =

Region of Somalia

Middle Shabelle Shabeellaha Dhexe Medio Scebeli
- Region
- Nickname: Shabellaha Dhexe
- Location in Southern Somalia.
- Coordinates: 6°6′47″N 47°59′17″E
- Country: Somalia
- State: Hirshabelle
- Established on: 10/10/2016
- Capital: Jowhar

Government
  - Type: Regional Government
  - Governor: Ahmed Meyere Makaran

Area
  - Total: 22,663 km^{2} (8,750 sq mi)

Population (2019)
  - Total: 622,700
  - Density: 27.48/km^{2} (71.16/sq mi)
- Time zone: UTC+3 (EAT)
- ISO 3166 code: SO-SD
- HDI (2021): 0.315 low · 12th of 18

Middle Shabelle (Somali: Shabeellaha Dhexe, Arabic: شبيلي الوسطى, Italian: Medio Scebeli) is an administrative region (gobol) in southern Somalia.

It is bordered by Hiran to the north, Galgaduud to the east, the Indian Ocean to the south and the region of Lower Shabelle and the capital Mogadishu to the west. The Shabelle River also passes through this region.

The region of Middle Shabelle formed the Hirshabelle State by 2016, which considers itself an autonomous state within the larger Federal Republic of Somalia, as defined by the Provisional Constitution of the Federal Republic of Somalia.

== Overview ==
As part of the former Benadir region, Middle Shabelle's capital was Mogadishu up until the mid-1980s, when the town of Jowhar became the capital. It is named after the Shebelle River that passes through this region.

The region is regarded as one of the most fertile regions in Somalia and was the first region to have multiple factories opened up in it, such as a sugar and clothes factory. It was also the main source of local grown food before the civil war.

Today, the region supports livestock production, rain-fed and irrigated agriculture and fisheries, with an annual rainfall between 150 and 500 millimeters. Covering an area of approximately 60,000 square kilometres, the region has a 400 kilometre coastline on the Indian Ocean. The Shabelle river runs for 150 kilometres through the region.

== Demographics ==
A pre-war census estimated the population at 2 million and today the Regional Council claims that the region's population is around 1.5 million. It is also estimated that 60% of the regions population are nomads or farmers.

However, the FSNAU population estimate survey in 2022 estimated the population as being 1,618,324, which is highly disputed.

The majority clans in the region Are the Abgaal and Galjecel. Other clans that live in the region include other Mudulood clans.

== Districts ==
Middle Shabelle Region consists of 11 districts:

- Jowhar District
- Jilyaale
- Balcad District
- Adale District
- Adan Yabaal District
- Warsheikh District
- Ruun-Nirgood District
- Mahadaay District
- Raagaceelle District
- El Gambole
- Ceel Baraf District
- Jameeca Jilyaale District
- Cali Guduud District
