= Mogadishu =

Capital and largest city of Somalia

Mogadishu Muqdisho (Somali) مقديشو (Arabic) Xamar (Somali) حمر (Arabic) Mogadiscio (Italian)
- Capital city
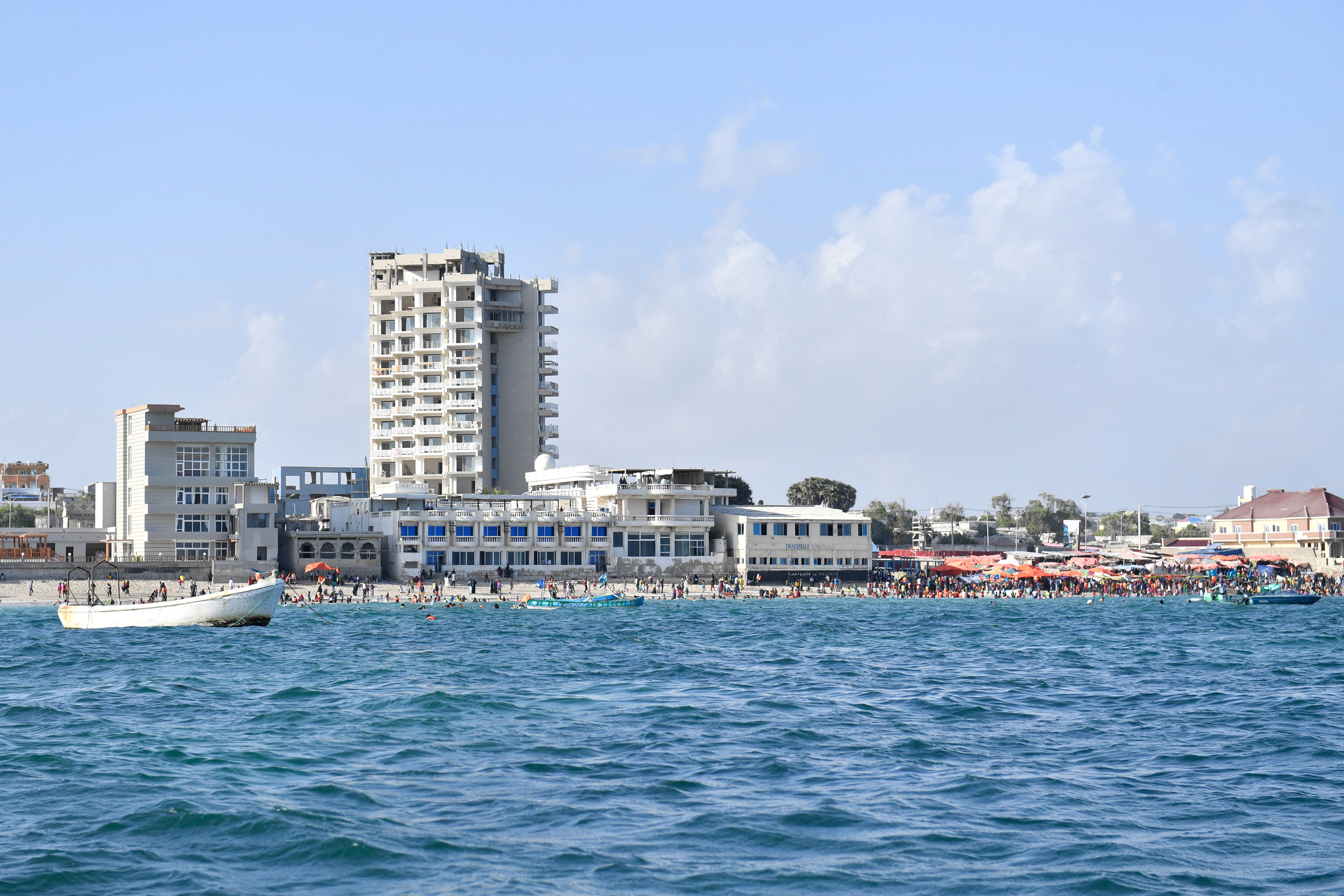
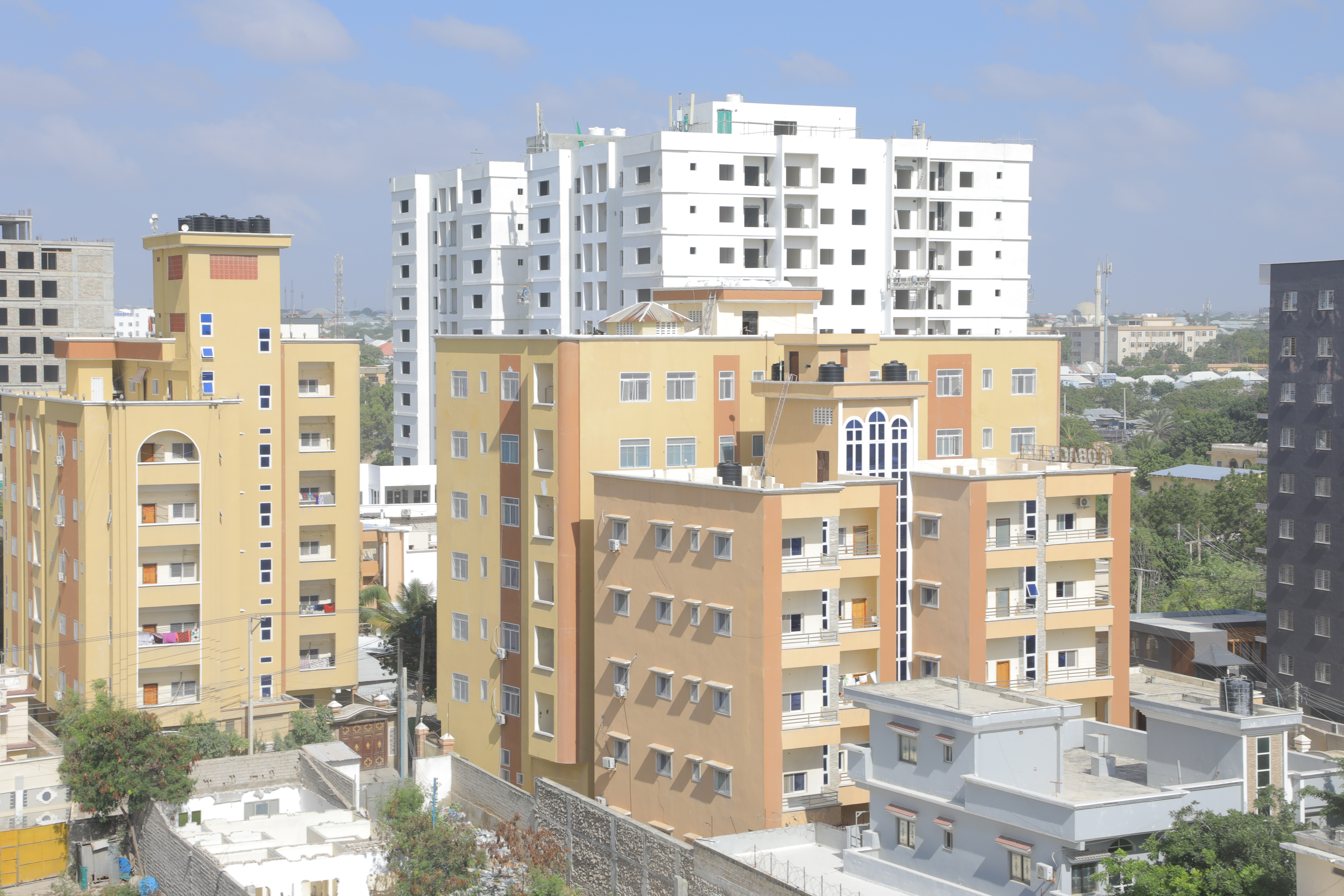
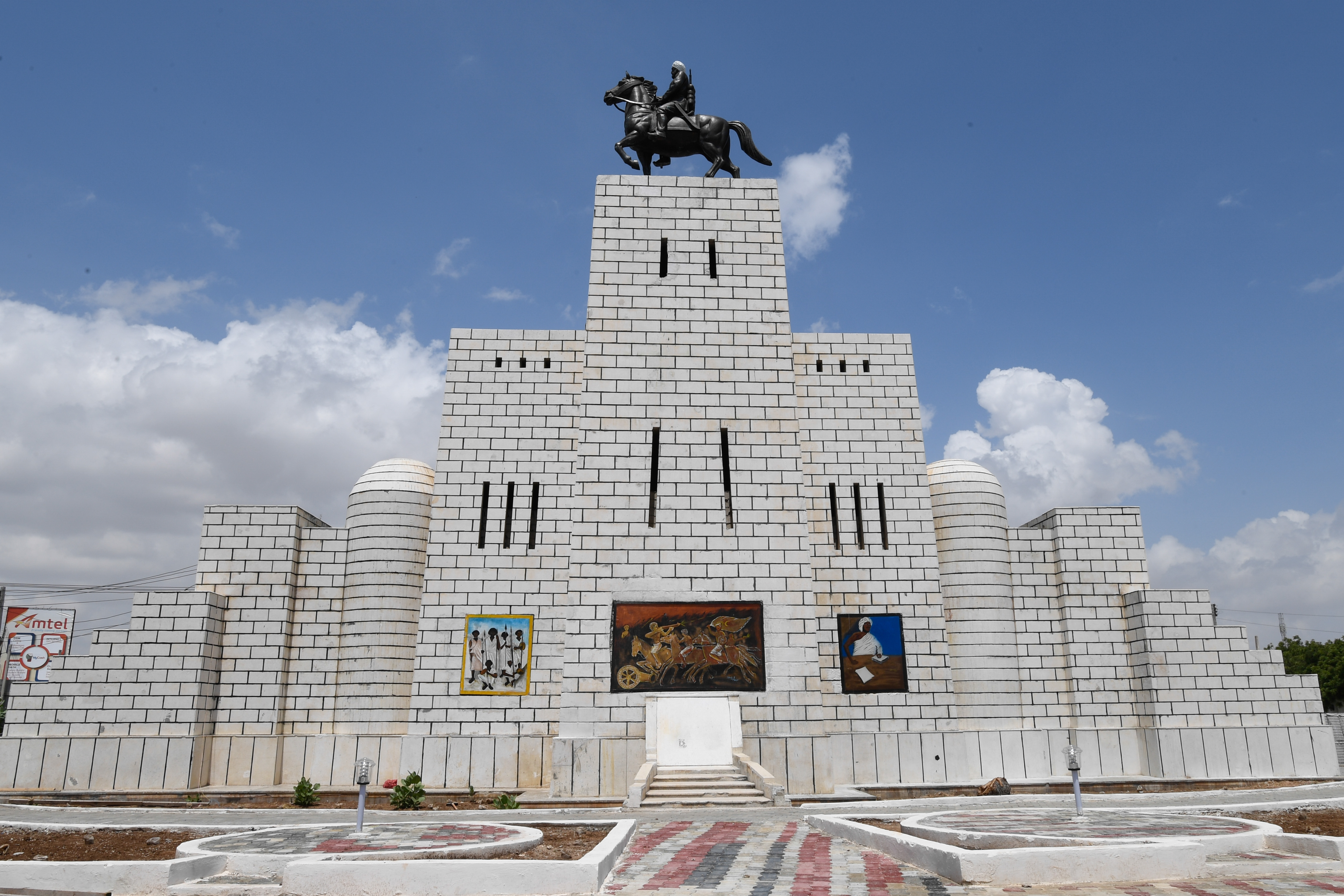
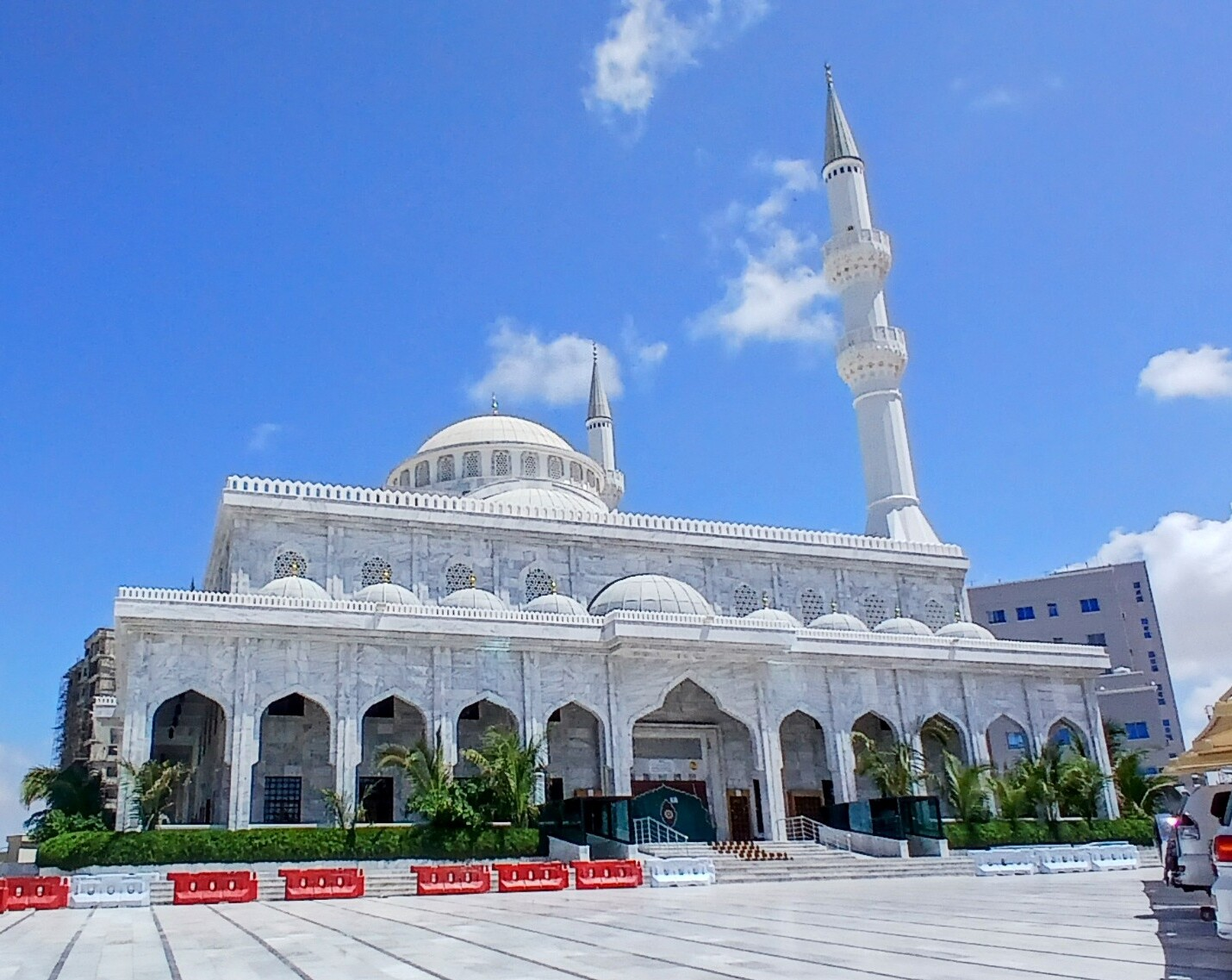
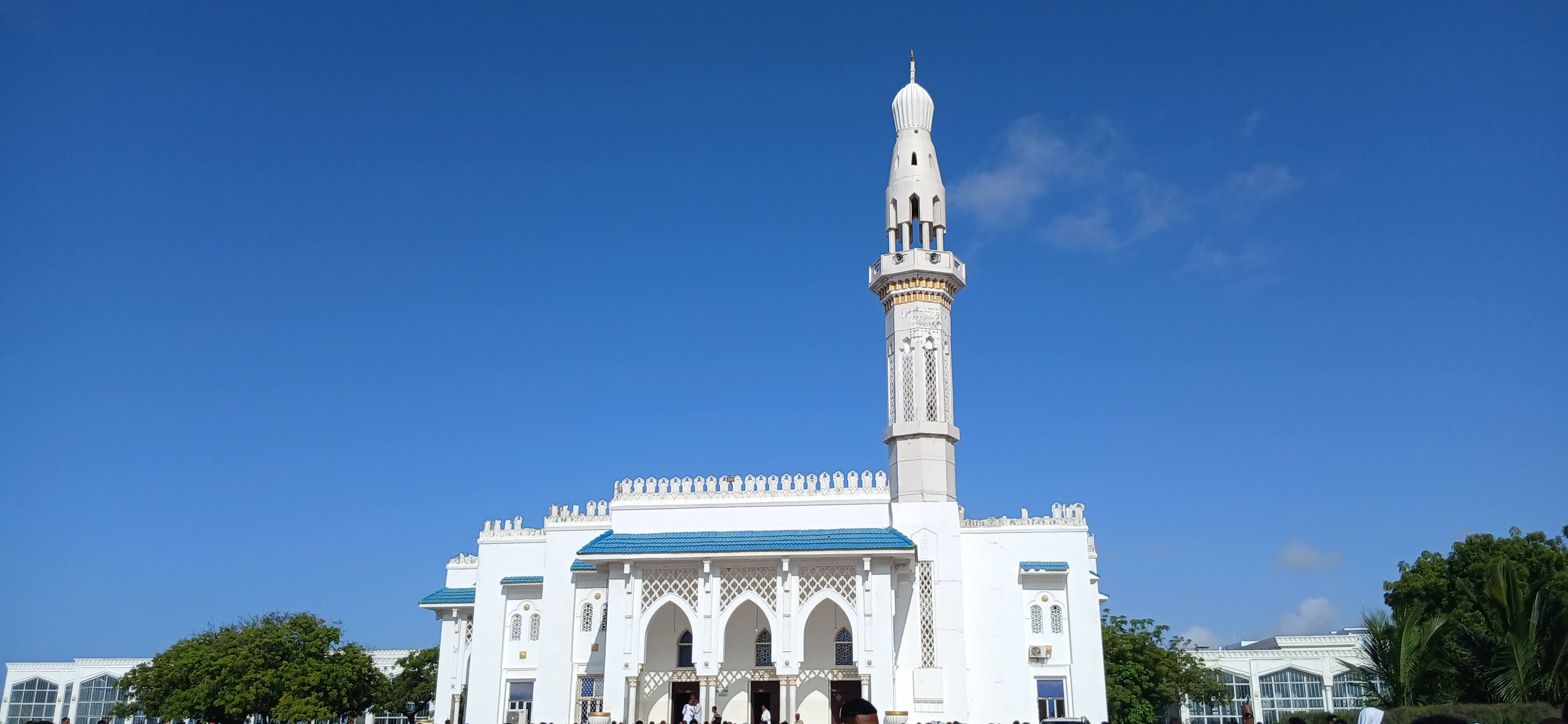
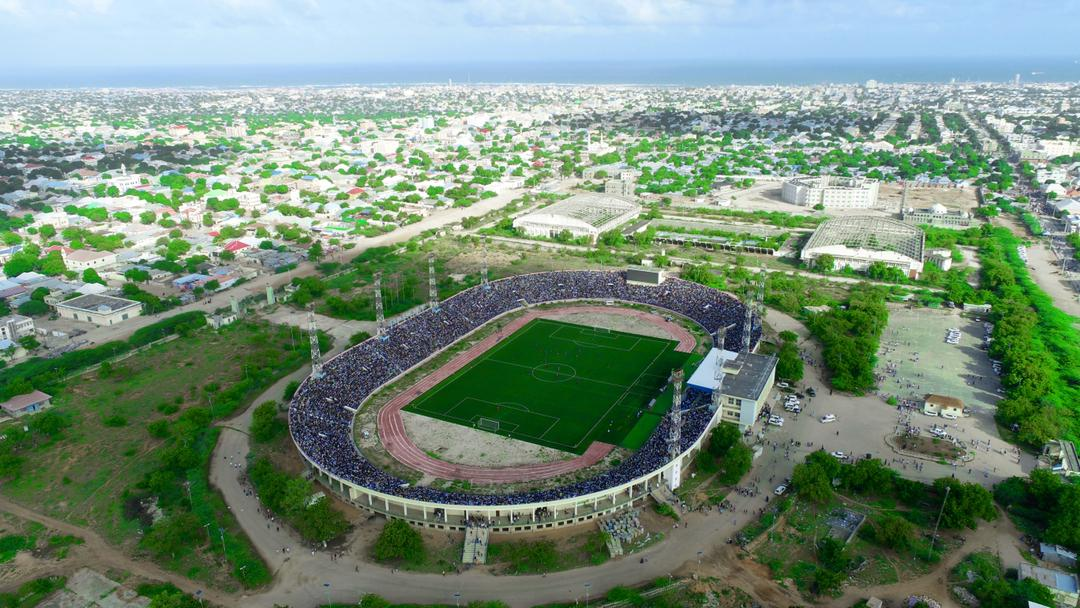
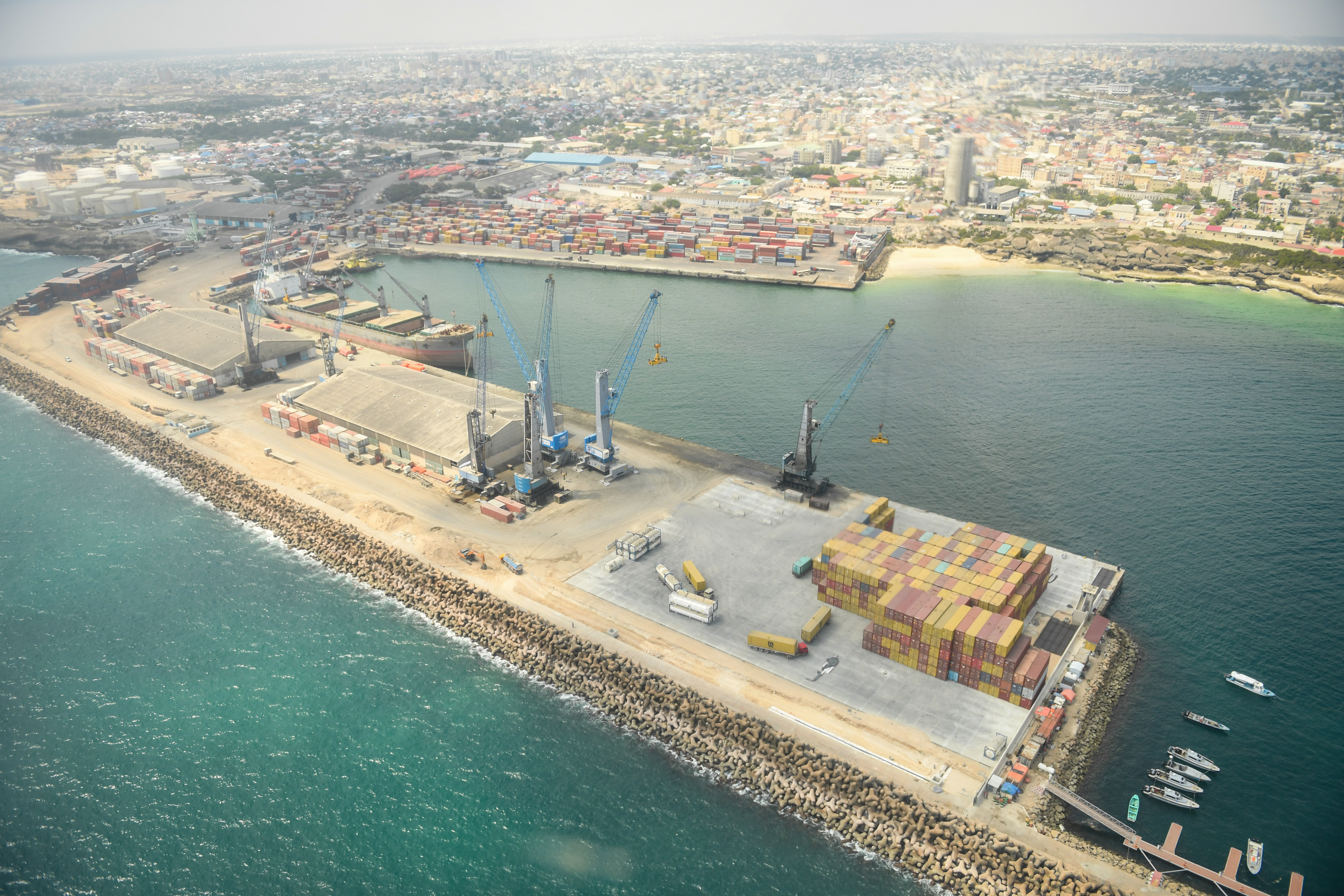
- Lido beach Hodan District Sayyidka monument Ali Jimale Mosque Isbahaysiga Mosque Mogadishu Stadium Port of Mogadishu

- Flag Coat of arms
- Interactive map of Mogadishu; Muqdisho (Somali)
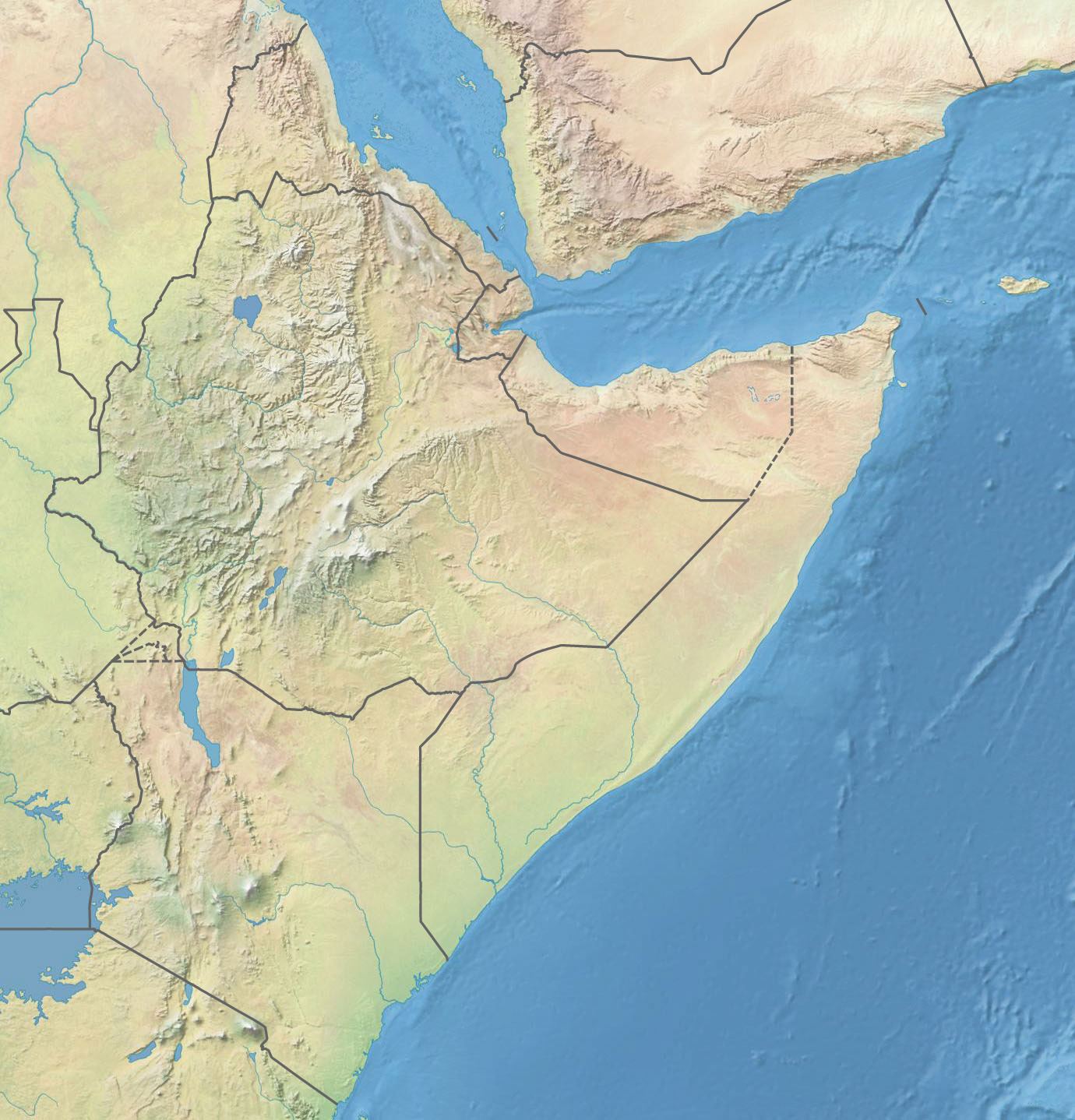
- Location within Somalia Location within the Horn of Africa Location within Africa
- Coordinates: 02°02′21″N 45°20′31″E
- Country: Somalia
- Region: Banaadir
- Founded: 720 CE

Government
  - Mayor: Hassan Mohamed Hussein

Area
  - Land: 370 km^{2} (140 sq mi)

Population (2025)
  - Total: 3,262,129
  - Density: 8,600/km^{2} (22,000/sq mi)
  - Rank: 1st
- Demonym(s): Mogadishan; Maqdishawi
- Time zone: UTC+03:00 (EAT)
- Climate: BSh
- HDI (2021): 0.459 low 1st
- Website: bra.gov.so

Mogadishu, (Note: /ˌmɒɡəˈdiːʃuː, -ˈdɪʃ-/, also US: /ˌmoʊɡ-, ˌmɔːɡ-/; Somali: Muqdisho, Wadaad: مُقْدِشو [muq'diʃo] or Xamar, Wadaad: حَمَرْ [ħamar]; Arabic: مقديشو, romanized: Maqadishu, Italian: Mogadiscio) locally known as Xamar or Hamar, is the capital and most populous city of Somalia. The city has served as an important port connecting traders across the Indian Ocean for millennia and has an estimated urban population of 4,126,815.

Mogadishu is located in the coastal Banaadir region on the Indian Ocean, which, unlike other Somali regions, is considered a municipality rather than a maamul goboleed (federal state).

Mogadishu has a long history, which ranges from the ancient period up until the present, serving as the capital of the Sultanate of Mogadishu in the 9th–13th century, which for many centuries controlled the Indian Ocean gold trade and eventually came under the Ajuran Sultanate in the 13th century which was an important player in the medieval Silk Road maritime trade. Mogadishu enjoyed the height of its prosperity during the 14th and 15th centuries and was, during the early modern period, considered the wealthiest city on the East African coast, as well as the center of a thriving textile industry. In the 17th century, Mogadishu and parts of southern Somalia fell under the Hiraab Imamate. In the 19th century, it came under the sphere of influence of the Sultanate of the Geledi.

In 1894, the Somali chief signed a treaty of peace, friendship, and protection with Filonardi of the Commercial Company of Benadir. The onset of Italian colonial rule occurred in stages, with treaties signed in the 1880s followed by economic engagement between Somali clans and the Commercial Company of Benadir, and then direct governance by the Italian Empire after 1906, British Military Administration of Somalia after World War II and the Trust Territory of Somaliland administered by Italy in the 1950s.

This was followed by independence in 1960, the Somali Democratic Republic era during Siad Barre's presidency (1969–1991). The three-decade long Somali Civil War afterwards devastated the city. In the late 2010s and 2020s, a period of major reconstruction commenced.

== Etymology ==
The origin of the name Mogadishu (Muqdisho) is thought to possibly be derived from the Somali words Muuq and Disho, which together mean "sight killer" or "blinder", possibly referring to the city's blinding beauty. The 16th century Andalusi explorer Leo Africanus knew the city as Magadazo (alt. Magadoxo) and described it as a "beautiful, rich place". Another theory is that the name consists of two Somali words, Maqal and Disho, meaning "the place where sheep are slaughtered".

The city nickname used by the locals is Xamar (Ḥamar), which may refer to the color red. This could be in reference to the reddish environment and hills, meaning a city that was built on red sand. The old neighborhood of Hamar Weyne combines two words, ḥamar (red) and weyn (big). It is also a Somali word for tamarind as well as for a chestnut-colored horse.

In Abyssinia, the city of Mogadishu and its surrounding area were known as Machidas. A thriving and powerful kingdom, with which the Abyssinians were frequently at war. Described as a fine city built at a short distance from the seashore. Machidas featured a king's palace, several mosques and houses of stone painted in fresco with terraced flat roofs. The name Machidas also appears on maps from the 18th and 19th centuries.

Medieval and early modern Arabic sources record Mogadishu as Maqdīshū (مقديشو). The book An Azanian Trio suggests a link to the Hebrew MQDSH (מקדש), meaning "holy place". The book further ties it to chronicles of two rabbis in Mogadishu's early history.

== History ==
=== Antiquity ===
View of Mogadishu, Somalia, by Capt: D. Crichton, 1751 - 25 July 1774, Dalrymple's charts, 1771-1806

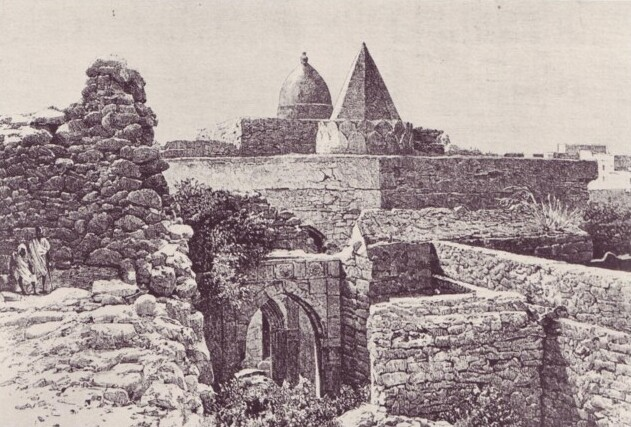
19th century engraving of the 13th century Fakr ad-Din Mosque built by Fakr ad-Din, the first Sultan of the Sultanate of Mogadishu

==== Sarapion ====
The ancient city of Sarapion is believed to have been the predecessor state of Mogadishu. It is mentioned in the Periplus of the Erythraean Sea, a Greek travel document dating from the first century AD, as one of a series of commercial ports on the Somali littoral. According to the Periplus, maritime trade already connected peoples in the Mogadishu area with other communities along the Indian Ocean.

During ancient times, Mogadishu was part of the Somali city-states that engaged in a lucrative trade network connecting Somali merchants with Phoenicia, Ptolemic Egypt, Greece, Parthian Persia, Sabaeans, Nabataea and the Roman Empire. Somali sailors used the ancient Somali maritime vessel known as the beden to transport their cargo.

=== Foundation and origins ===
The founding ethnicity of Mogadishu and its subsequent sultanate has been a topic of intrigue in Somali studies. Ioan Lewis and Enrico Cerulli believed that the city was founded and ruled by a council of Arab and Persian families. However, the reference I.M. Lewis and Cerulli received traces back to one 19th-century text called the Kitab Al-Zunuj, which has been discredited by modern scholars as unreliable and unhistorical. More importantly, it contradicts ancient oral and written sources, as well as archaeological evidence on the pre-existing civilizations and communities that flourished on the Somali coast, which were the forefathers of Mogadishu and other coastal cities. Thus, the Persian and Arab founding "myths" are regarded as an outdated, false colonialist reflection on Somalis' ability to create their own sophisticated states. It has now been widely accepted that there were already communities on the Somali coast with ethnic Somali leadership, of whom the Arab and Persian families had to ask for permission to settle in their cities. It also seems the local Somalis retained their political and numerical superiority on the coast, while the Muslim immigrants would go through an assimilation process by adopting the local language and culture.

Mogadishu, along with Zeila and other Somali coastal cities, was founded upon an indigenous network involving hinterland trade, and that happened even before significant Arab migrations or trade with the Somali coast. That goes back approximately four thousand years and is supported by archaeological and textual evidence.

This is corroborated by the first-century CE Greek document, the Periplus of the Erythraean Sea, detailing multiple prosperous port cities in ancient Somalia, as well as the identification of ancient Sarapion with the city that would later be known as Mogadishu. When Ibn Battuta visited the Sultanate in the 14th century, he identified the Sultan as being of Barbara origin, an ancient term to describe the ancestors of the Somali people. According to Ross E. Dunn, neither Mogadishu nor any other city on the coast could be considered alien enclaves of Arabs or Persians, but were, in fact, Somali towns.

Yaqut al-Hamawi, a Muslim medieval geographer in the year 1220, describes Mogadishu as the most prominent town on the coast. Yaqut also mentioned Mogadishu as being a town inhabited by Berbers, described as "dark-skinned" and considered ancestors of modern Somalis. By the thirteenth century, Ibn Sa'id described Mogadishu, Merca and Barawa located on the Benadir coast had become Islamic and commercial centers in the Indian Ocean. He said the local people in the Benadir coast and the interior were predominantly inhabited by Somalis, with a minority of Arab, Persian and Indian merchants living in the coastal towns. Ibn al-Mujawir mentions the Banu Majid, who fled the Mundhiriya region in Yemen in the year 1159 and settled in Mogadishu and also traders from the port towns of Abyan and Haram.

Mogadishu is traditionally inhabited by four clans. These are the Moorshe, Iskashato, DhabarWeyne, and the Bandawow. Moorshe is regarded as the oldest group in Mogadishu and is considered to be a sub-clan of Ajuran who established one of the most powerful medieval kingdoms in Africa, the Ajuran Sultanate. The Gibil Madow (Dark Skins) faction of the Benadiri are said to hail from the Somali clan groups from inland which make up the majority of Benadiris with a small minority being Gibil Cads (Light Skins) which descend from Muslim immigrants.

=== Medieval Period ===
==== Mogadishu Sultanate ====
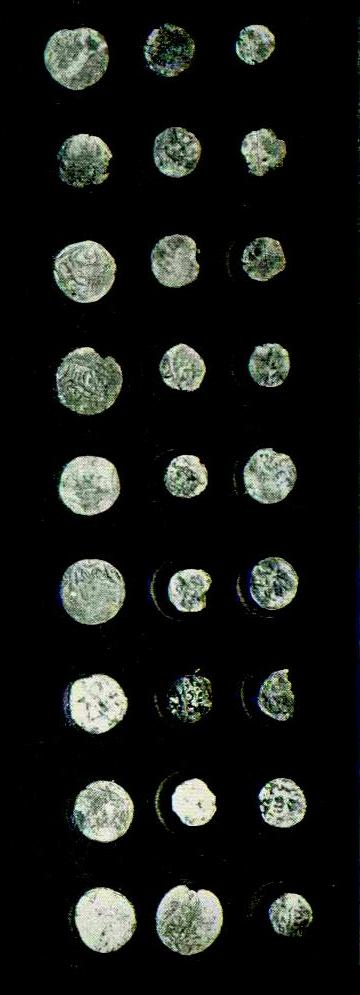
Mogadishan currency

The Mogadishu Sultanate was a medieval Somali sultanate centered in southern Somalia. It rose as one of the pre-eminent powers in the Horn of Africa under the rule of Fakhr ad-Din before becoming part of the expanding Ajuran Empire in the 13th century. The Mogadishu Sultanate maintained a vast trading network, dominated the regional gold trade, minted its own currency, and left an extensive architectural legacy in present-day southern Somalia. A local city-state with much influence over the hinterland neighbouring coastal towns. Commerce relationships also existed with inland towns such as Harar.

For many years Mogadishu functioned as the pre-eminent city in the بلد البربر (Bilad al Barbar – "Land of the Berbers"), as medieval Arabic-speakers named the Somali coast. Following his visit to the city, the 12th-century Syrian historian Yaqut al-Hamawi (a former slave of Greek origin) wrote a global history of many places he visited Mogadishu and called it the richest and most powerful city in the region and was an Islamic center across the Indian Ocean.

==== Medieval Mogadishu ====
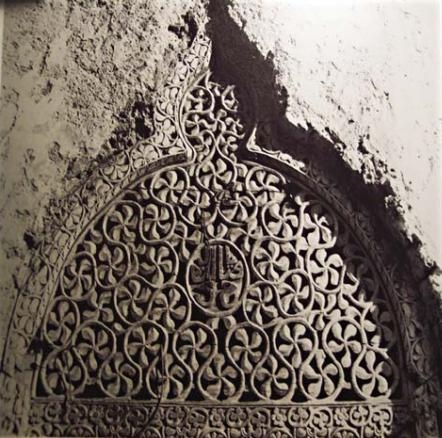
Entrance of a coral stone house in Mogadishu

During his travels, ibn Sa'id al-Maghribi (1213–1286) noted that Mogadishu city had already become the leading Islamic centre in the region. By the time of the Tangier born traveller ibn Battuta's appearance on the coastline of Somalia in 1331, the city was at the zenith of its prosperity. He described Mogadishu as "an exceedingly large city" with many rich merchants, which was famous for its high quality fabric that it exported to Mamluk Sultanate-ruled Egypt, among other places. He also describes the hospitality of the people of Mogadishu and how locals would put travellers up in their home to help the local economy. Battuta added that the city was ruled by a Somali sultan, Abu Bakr ibn Shaikh 'Umar, He noted that Sultan Abu Bakr had dark skin complexion and spoke in his native tongue (Somali) but was also fluent in Arabic. The Sultan also had a retinue of viziers, legal experts, commanders, royal eunuchs, and other officials at his beck and call. Ibn Khaldun (1332 to 1406) noted in his book that Mogadishu was a massive metropolis. He also claimed that the city was very populous with many wealthy merchants.

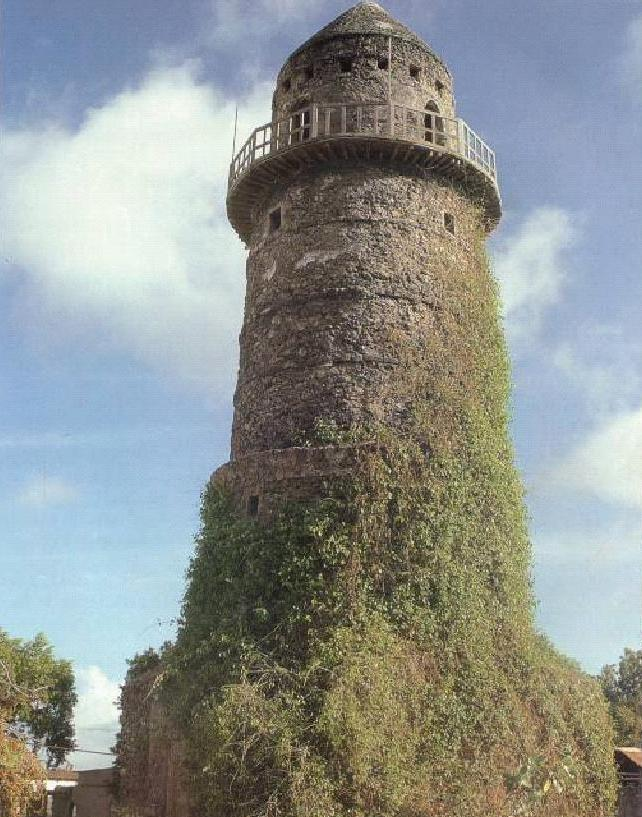
Almnara Tower, Mogadishu

This period gave birth to notable figures like Abd al-Aziz of Mogadishu who was described as the governor and island chief of Maldives by ibn Battuta. After him is named the Abdul-Aziz Mosque of Mogadishu, which survived for centuries.

The island's appellation "Madagascar" is not of local origin but rather was popularized in the Middle Ages by Europeans. The name Madageiscar was first recorded in the memoirs of 13th-century Venetian explorer Marco Polo as a corrupted transliteration of the name Mogadishu, the famous port with which Polo had confused the island.

Vasco da Gama, who passed by Mogadishu in the 15th century, noted that it was a large city with houses of four or five stories high and large palaces in its centre and many mosques with cylindrical minarets. In the 16th century, Duarte Barbosa noted that many ships from the Kingdom of Cambaya sailed to Mogadishu with cloths and spices for which they in return received gold, wax and ivory. Barbosa also highlighted the abundance of meat, wheat, barley, horses, and fruit on the coastal markets, which generated enormous wealth for the merchants. Mogadishu, the center of a thriving weaving industry known as toob benadir (specialized for the markets in Egypt and Syria), together with Merca and Barawa also served as transit stops for Swahili merchants from Mombasa and Malindi and for the gold trade from Kilwa. Jewish merchants from Ormus also brought their Indian textile and fruit to the Somali coast in exchange for grain and wood.

Duarte Barbosa, the famous Portuguese traveller, wrote about Mogadishu (c 1517–1518):

It has a king over it, and is a place of great trade in merchandise. Ships come there from the kingdom of Cambay (India) and from Aden with stuffs of all kinds, and with spices. And they carry away from there much gold, ivory, beeswax, and other things upon which they make a profit. In this town there is plenty of meat, wheat, barley, and horses, and much fruit: it is a very rich place.

In 1542, the Portuguese commander João de Sepúvelda led a small fleet on an expedition to the Somali coast. During this expedition, he briefly attacked Mogadishu, capturing an Ottoman ship and firing upon the city, which compelled the sultan of Mogadishu to sign a peace treaty with the Portuguese.

Flag of the Mogadishu area according to a 1576 map by Fernão Vaz Dourado

According to the 16th-century explorer, Leo Africanus indicates that the native inhabitants of the Mogadishu polity were of the same origins as the denizens of the northern people of Zeila region. They were generally tall with an olive skin complexion, some darker. They would wear traditional rich white silk wrapped around their bodies and have Islamic turbans, and coastal people only wore sarongs and wrote in Arabic as a lingua franca. Their weaponry consisted of traditional Somali weapons such as swords, daggers, spears, battle axe, and bow and arrows. However, they received assistance from its close ally, the Ottoman Empire, and with the import of firearms such as muskets and cannons. Most were Muslims, although a few adhered to pre-Islamic beliefs; there were also some Orthodox Tewahedo Christians further inland. Mogadishu itself was a wealthy, and well-built city-state, which maintained commercial trade with kingdoms across the world. The metropolis city was surrounded by walled stone fortifications.

The Ajuran Sultanate collapsed in the 17th century due to heavy taxation against their subjects, which started a rebellion. The ex-subjects became a new wave of Somali migrants, the Abgaal, moved both into the Shebelle River basin and Mogadishu. A new political elite led by Abgaal Yaquub imams, with ties to the new leaders in the interior, moved into the Shangani District of the city. Remnants of the Ajuran lived in the other key-quarters of Hamar Weyne District. Ajuran merchants began to look for new linkages and regional trade opportunities since the Abgaal had commandeered the existing trading networks.

=== Early Modern period (1700s–1900s) ===
==== Hiraab Imamate ====
By the 17th century, the Hiraab Imamate was a powerful kingdom that ruled large parts of southern and central Somalia. It successfully revolted against the Ajuran Sultanate and established an independent rule for at least two centuries from the seventeen hundreds and onwards. The Hiraab Imamate also exerted a centralized authority during its existence and possessed some of the organs and trappings of a traditional integrated state: a functioning bureaucracy, a state flag, regular correspondence with neighbouring civilizations in written Arabic, taxation in the form of livestock and cash crops including a third of the Mogadishu emporium port's revenue as well as a professional army.

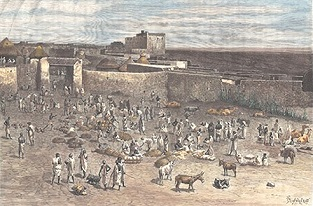
During the decline of the Hiraab, major cities, especially Mogadishu shrank in size this worsened with the Hiraab Civil War

By the late 19th century, the Imamate began to decline due to internal problems, whereas it also faced challenges from Imperialist kingdoms, the Zanzibari Sultan from the coast and Sultanate of the Geledi, and Sultanate of Hobyo from the interior from both directions.

==== Geledi Sultanate ====
The Sultanate of Geledi and the Omani Empire vied over who would be the superior power on the Benadir Coast, with Sultan Yusuf Mahamud ultimately being the dominant force with the Omanis having a nominal presence and Said bin Sultan even paying tribute to him to keep Omani representatives in Mogadishu. Mogadishu under Abgaal control had been in a period of decline and disarray near the end of the Hiraab Imamate. Following a struggle between the two leading figures of each respective quarter (Shingani and Hamarweyn) Sultan Yusuf marched into the city with an 8,000 strong army and ruled in favour of the Shingani leader, with the loser fleeing the city. Yusuf would nominate a relative of the deposed chief to lead the Hamarweyn quarter ending the dispute. Sultan Yusuf is even referred to as the governor of Mogadishu in some sources, highlighting the power he exerted over the city.

Despite the Somali political decline, trade with Geledi Sultanate flourished during Geledi Sultan Ahmed Yusuf's reign. British explorer John Kirk visited the region in 1873 and noted a variety of things. Roughly 20 large dhows were docked in both Mogadishu and Merka filled with grain produced from the farms of the Geledi in the interior. Kirk met the Imam Mahmood who reigned over Mogadishu. The Shebelle River itself was referred to as the 'Geledi river' by Kirk, perhaps in respect of the volume of produce that the Sultanate output. In Barawa there was little grain instead a large quantity of ivory and skins which had already been loaded onto ships destined for Zanzibar.

The Geledi Sultans were at the height of their power. They dominated the East African ivory trade, and also held sway over the Jubba and Shebelle valleys in the hinterland. The Omani Sultans' authority in Mogadishu, however, was largely nominal (existing by name only). When Imam Azzan bin Qais of Oman sought to build a fort in the city, he was thus obligated to request permission from Sultan Ahmed Yusuf the real power broker who in turn convinced the Hiraab Imam to acquiesce to the decision. Omani and later Zanzibari officials were mere representatives of the Sultan to collect customs and needed the fort for their own security rather than control of the city. The Fort of Garessa was eventually constructed in 1870. The Sultan of Zanzibar later leased and then sold the infrastructure that he had built to the Italians, but not the land itself, which was Somali owned. In the late 1800s, the Khedivate of Egypt temporarily occupied Mogadishu without facing any local opposition. However, due to logistical challenges and the deployment of warships by Britain, they were forced to retreat.

=== Italian Somaliland (late 1800s–1960) ===
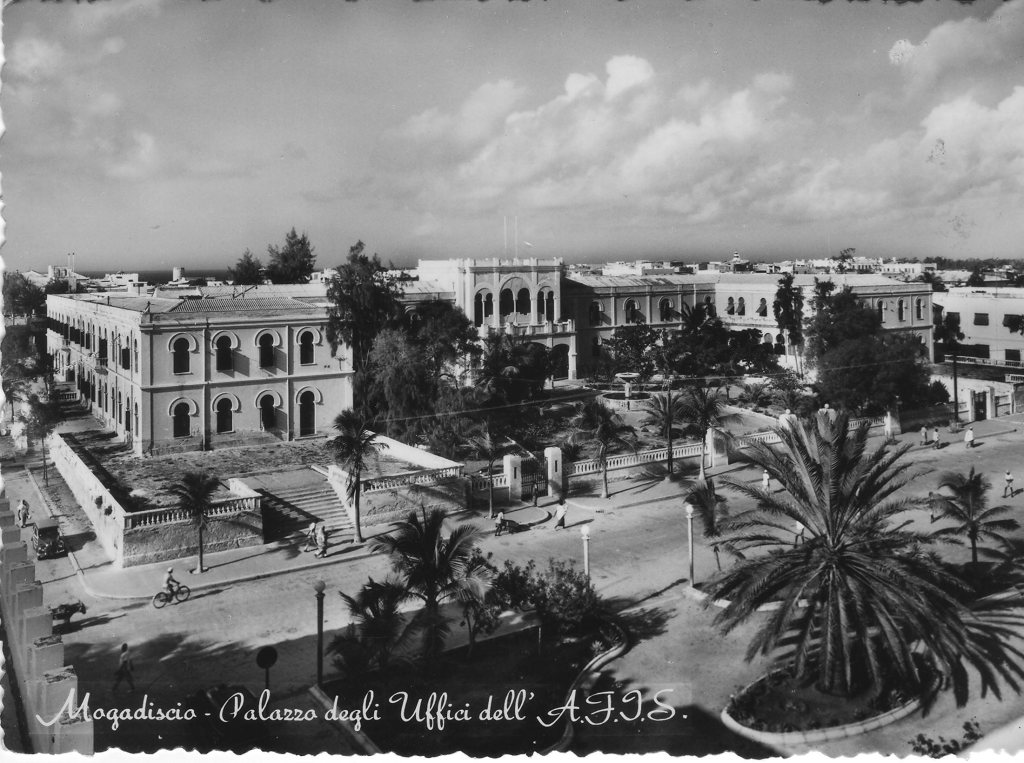
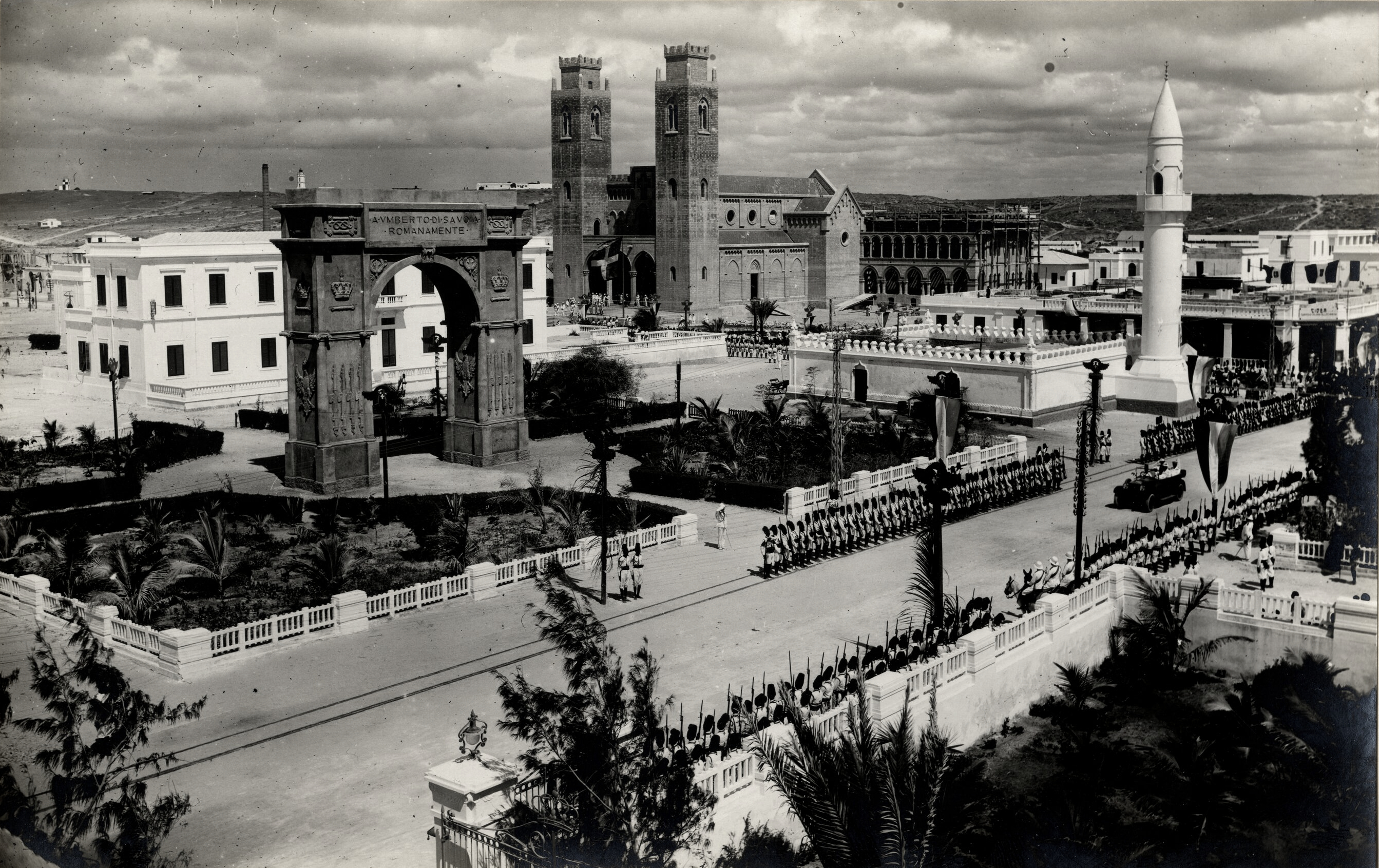
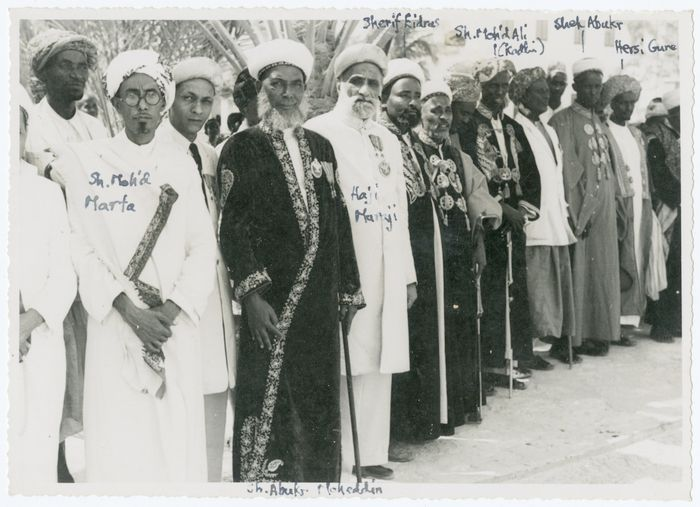
Mogadishu during the period of Italian colonial period. Clockwise from upper left: Main street view of Arba'a Rukun Mosque (1920), The city skyline (1923), general views of the capital (1928), and senior Somali officials returning from Italy (1939).

In 1905, Italy made Mogadishu the capital of the newly established Italian Somaliland. The Italians subsequently spelled the name of the city as Mogadiscio. After World War I, the surrounding territory came under Italian control with some resistance.

Thousands of Italians and other people from the Italian empire began to settle in Mogadishu and founded small manufacturing companies across Somalia. They also developed some agricultural areas in the south near the capital, such as Janale and the Villaggio duca degli Abruzzi (present-day Jowhar). In the 1930s, new buildings and avenues were built. A 114 km (71 mi) narrow-gauge railway was laid from Mogadishu to Jowhar. An asphalt road, the Strada Imperiale, was also constructed and intended to link Mogadishu to Addis Ababa.

In 1940, the Italo-Somali population numbered 22,000, accounting for over 44% of the city's population of 50,000 residents. Mogadishu remained the capital of Italian Somaliland throughout the latter polity's existence. In World War II it was captured by British forces in February 1941.

After World War II Mogadishu was made the capital of the Trust Territory of Somaliland, an Italian administered fiduciary political entity under the UN mandate, for ten years (1950–1960).

=== Somali Republic (1960–1991) ===
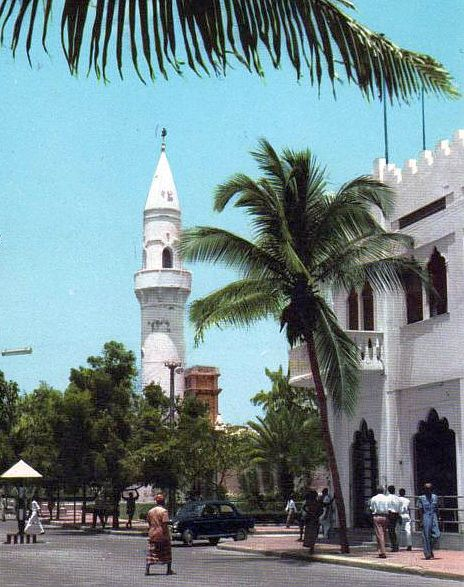
Mogadishu Avenue, 1963

British Somaliland became independent on 26 June 1960 as the State of Somaliland, and the Trust Territory of Somalia (the former Italian Somaliland) followed suit five days later. On 1 July 1960, the two territories united to form the Somali Republic, with Mogadishu serving as the nation's capital. A government was formed by Abdullahi Issa and other members of the trusteeship and protectorate governments, with Haji Bashir Ismail Yusuf as President of the Somali National Assembly, Aden Abdullah Osman Daar as President of the Somali Republic, and Abdirashid Ali Shermarke as Prime Minister (later to become president from 1967 to 1969). On 20 July 1961 and through a popular referendum, the people of Somalia ratified a new constitution, which was first drafted in 1960. In 1967, Muhammad Haji Ibrahim Egal became Prime Minister, a position to which he was appointed by Shermarke.

On 15 October 1969, while paying a visit to the northern town of Las Anod, Somalia's then President Abdirashid Ali Shermarke was assassinated by one of his own bodyguards. His assassination was quickly followed by a military coup d'état on 21 October 1969 (the day after his funeral), in which the Somali Army seized power without encountering armed opposition, essentially a bloodless takeover. The putsch was spearheaded by Major General Mohamed Siad Barre, who at the time commanded the army.

Street scene in Mogadishu, 1966

Alongside Barre, the Supreme Revolutionary Council (SRC) that assumed power after President Sharmarke's assassination was led by Lieutenant Colonel Salaad Gabeyre Kediye and Chief of Police Jama Ali Korshel. Kediye officially held the title of "Father of the Revolution," and Barre shortly afterwards became the head of the SRC. The SRC subsequently renamed the country the Somali Democratic Republic, arrested members of the former civilian government, banned political parties, dissolved the parliament and the Supreme Court, and suspended the constitution.

The revolutionary army established large-scale public works programmes, including the Mogadishu Stadium. In addition to a nationalization programme of industry and land, the Mogadishu-based new regime's foreign policy placed an emphasis on Somalia's traditional and religious links with the Arab world, eventually joining the Arab League in 1974.

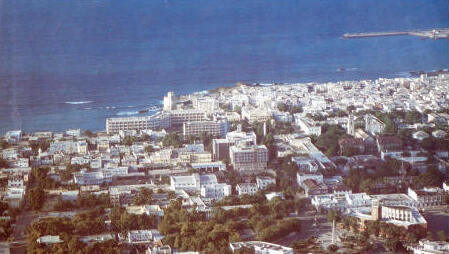
Metropolitan Mogadishu in the 1980s

After fallout from the unsuccessful Ogaden campaign of the late 1970s, the Barre administration began arresting government and military officials under suspicion of participation in the 1978 coup d'état attempt. Most of the people who had allegedly helped plot the putsch were summarily executed. However, several officials escaped abroad and started to form dissident groups dedicated to ousting Barre's regime by force.

=== Civil war ===
By the late 1980s, Barre's regime had become increasingly unpopular. The authorities became ever more totalitarian, and resistance movements, encouraged by Ethiopia's communist Derg administration, sprang up across the country. Mogadishu saw its first major outbreak of violence during the 14 July 1989 riots, during the crackdown Barres forces killed approximately 400 civilians. The July 1989 riots resulted in a large exodus of foreigners from the city and intensification of opposition towards the regime. This incident and other events over the following months led to the toppling of Barre's government, and the final splintering and disappearance of the Somali Armed Forces. Many of the opposition groups began competing for influence in the power vacuum that followed the ouster of Barre's regime. Armed factions led by United Somali Congress commanders General Mohamed Farah Aidid and Ali Mahdi Mohamed, in particular, clashed as each sought to exert authority over the capital.

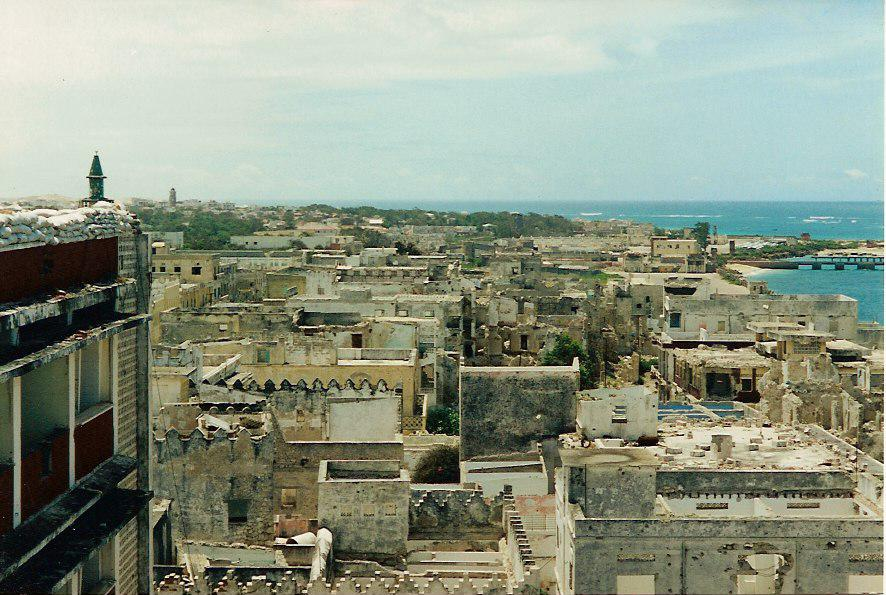
A view over destroyed Mogadishu coast during the civil war

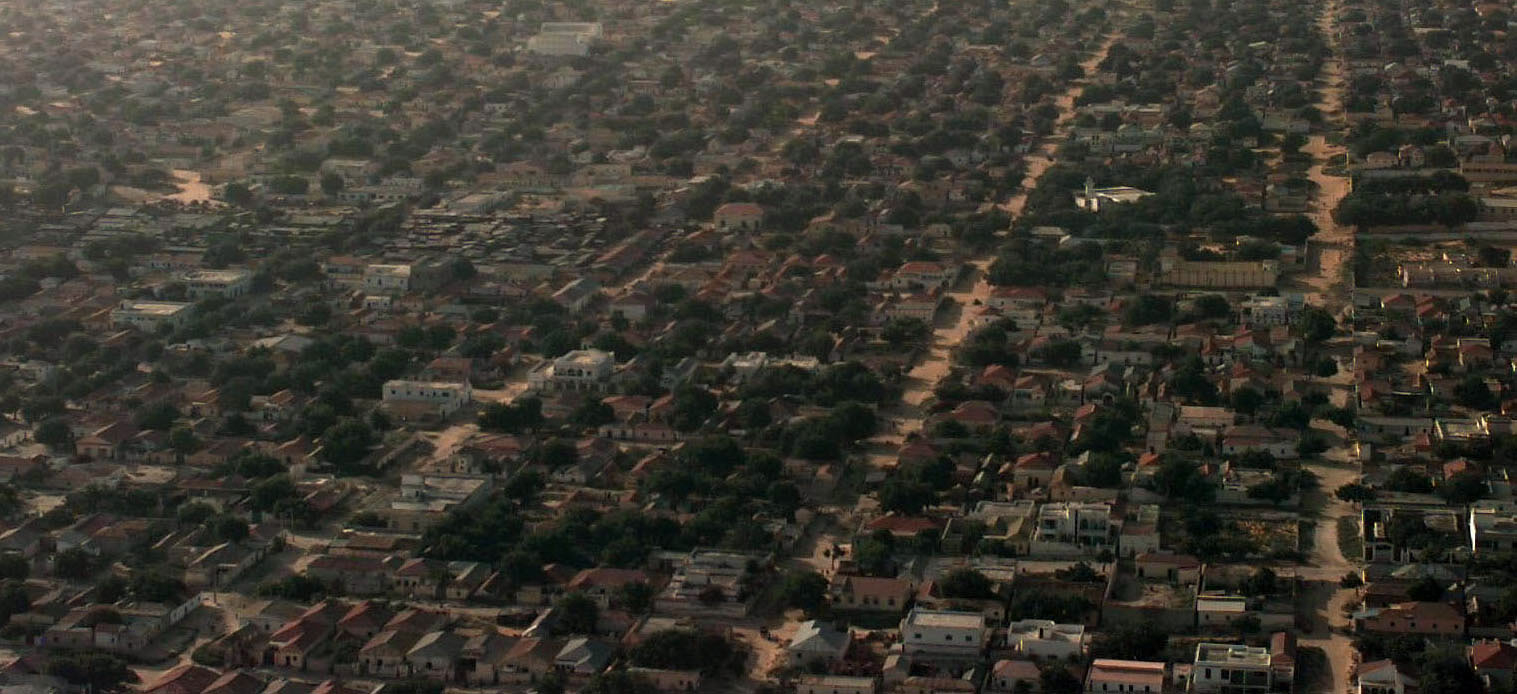
Aerial view of a residential area in Mogadishu (1992)

During the United Nations Operation in Somalia II several gun battles took place in Mogadishu between Somali factions, volunteers and peacekeepers. Among these was the Battle of Mogadishu of 1993, a US apprehension of two high-ranking lieutenants of the Somali National Alliance. The UN soldiers withdrew altogether from the country on 3 March 1995, having incurred more significant casualties.

In 2006, the Islamic Courts Union (ICU), an Islamist organization, assumed control of much of the southern part of the country and imposed sharia law. The new Transitional Federal Government (TFG), established two years earlier, sought to establish its authority. With the assistance of Ethiopian troops, AMISOM peacekeepers and air support by the United States, it drove out the rival ICU and solidified its rule. On 8 January 2007, as the Battle of Ras Kamboni raged, TFG President and founder Abdullahi Yusuf Ahmed, a former colonel in the Somali Army, entered Mogadishu for the first time since being elected to office. The government then relocated to Villa Somalia in Mogadishu from its interim location in Baidoa, marking the first time since the fall of the Barre regime in 1991 that the federal government controlled most of the country.

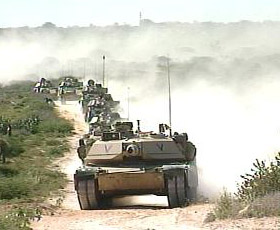
An armoured column of M1A1 Abrams Tanks and M2 Bradley IFVs of 1–64th Armor move down a dirt road outside the city of Mogadishu

Following this defeat, the Islamic Courts Union splintered into factions. Some of the more radical elements, including a youth militia within the Courts' military wing known as al-Shabaab, regrouped to continue their insurgency against the TFG and oppose the Ethiopian military's presence in Somalia. Throughout 2007 and 2008 al-Shabaab scored military victories by seizing control of key towns and ports in both central and southern Somalia. At the end of 2008, the group had captured Baidoa but not Mogadishu. By January 2009, al-Shabaab and other militias had managed to force the Ethiopian troops to retreat and leave behind an under-equipped African Union peacekeeping force to assist the Transitional Federal Government's troops.

Between 31 May and 9 June 2008, representatives of Somalia's federal government and the moderate Alliance for the Re-liberation of Somalia (ARS) group of Islamist rebels participated in peace talks in Djibouti brokered by the UN. The conference ended with a signed agreement calling for the withdrawal of Ethiopian troops in exchange for the cessation of armed conflict. Parliament was subsequently expanded to 550 seats to accommodate ARS members, which then elected a new president. With the help of a small team of African Union troops, the coalition government also began a counteroffensive in February 2009 to retake control of the southern half of the country. To solidify its control of southern Somalia, the TFG formed an alliance with the Islamic Courts Union, other members of the Alliance for the Re-liberation of Somalia, and Ahlu Sunna Waljama'a, a moderate Sufi militia.

In November 2010, a new technocratic government was elected to office, which enacted numerous reforms, especially in the security sector. By August 2011, the new administration and its AMISOM allies had managed to capture all of Mogadishu from the Al-Shabaab militants. Mogadishu has subsequently experienced a period of intense reconstruction spearheaded by the Somali diaspora, the municipal authorities, and Turkey, a historic ally of Somalia.

In October 2017, over 500 people were killed by a truck bombing.

In March 2022, al-Shabaab killed over 60 people in a series of attacks.

In October 2022, an al-Shabaab double car bombing killed over 120 people. On 14 March, militants attacked and sieged the SYL Hotel in Mogadishu.

In July 2024, at least eight people were killed and twenty-one others injured in a shootout between security forces and inmates in a Mogadishu prison during an escape attempt. The prisoners who attempted to escape were members of Al-Shabaab. On 14 July, 10 people were injured in a café due to a car bombing done by Al-Shabaab.

In August 2024, 37 people were killed by an Al-Shabaab suicide bomber at Lido Beach.

=== Reconstruction ===
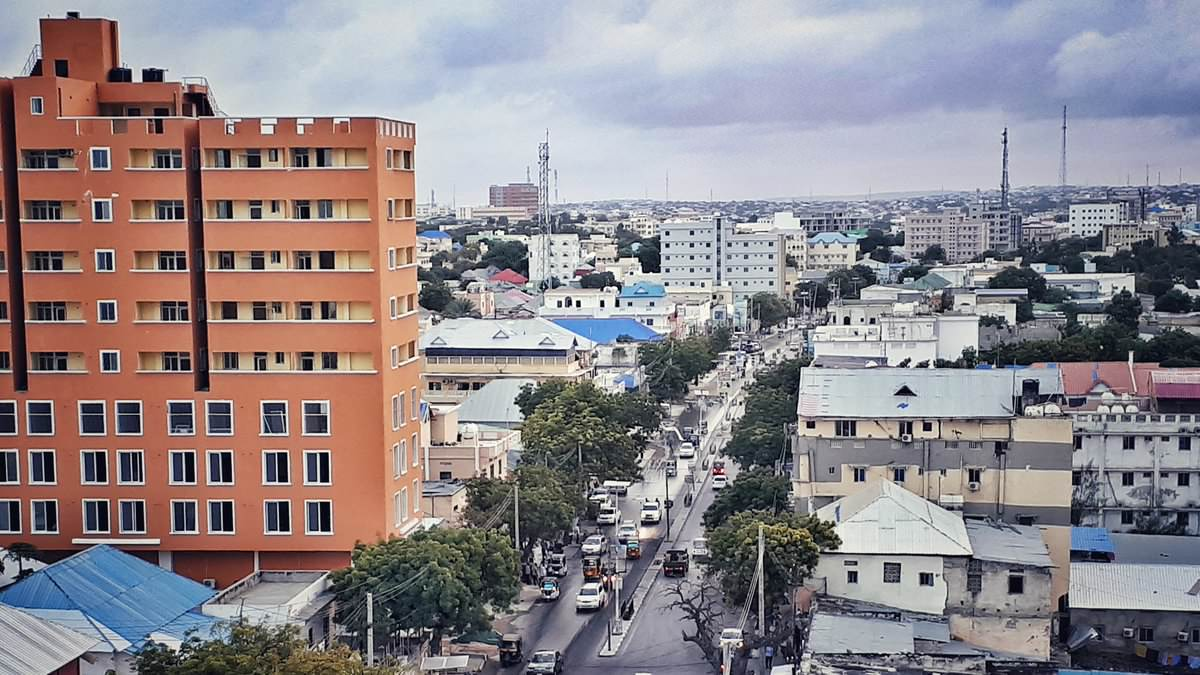
Mogadishu Overview, 2017

In August 2011, militant group al Shabaab made a strategic withdrawal from Mogadishu to return to hit-and-run tactics. Mayor Mohamed Nur recognized the opportunity as critical to stabilizing and rebuilding the city. Working closely with the UN, USAID, and DRC, Nur's administration started large-scale rehabilitation of roads and general infrastructure, with residents cooperating with the civil and police authorities to tighten up on security. Nur recognized the opportunity to transform Mogadishu although resources were limited. Working with urban strategist Mitchell Sipus, the Benadir government sought to design and deploy a data-driven approach to post-war reconstruction.

With the passing of a new Constitution in 2012 and the subsequent election of an inaugural President in the new Federal Government, the mayorship continued to oversee Mogadishu's ongoing post-conflict reconstruction. Building off the initial pilot, the Benadir administration launched a citywide street naming, house numbering and postal codes project. Officially called the House Numbering and Post Code System, it is a joint initiative of the municipal authorities and Somali business community representatives. According to Nur, the initiative also aims to help the authorities firm up on security and resolve housing ownership disputes. As of 2016, there are postal codes for 156 localities and sub-localities, including the Mogadishu metropolitan area.

The post-conflict reconstruction of Mogadishu in the 2010s and 2020s has led to a construction and housing boom, giving Somalia one of the fastest urbanisation rates in the world. According to the office of the mayor of Mogadishu, over 6,000 new buildings were constructed in the city between 2020 and 2025.

== Government ==
=== Federal ===
The Government of Somalia has its seat in Mogadishu, the nation's capital. The Transitional Federal Government (TFG) was the internationally recognized central government of Somalia between 2004 and 2012. Based in Mogadishu, it constituted the executive branch of government.

The Federal Government of Somalia was established on 20 August 2012 at the end of the TFG's interim mandate. It represented the first permanent central government in the country since the start of the civil war. The Federal Parliament of Somalia serves as the government's legislative branch.

=== Municipal ===
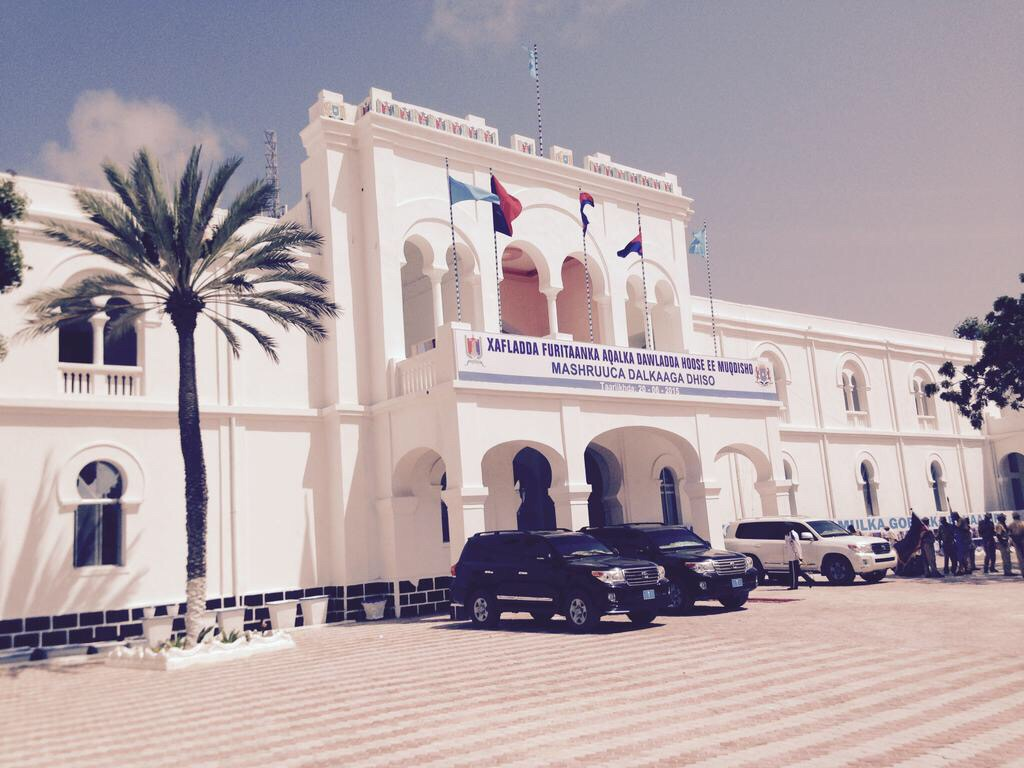
The Mogadishu municipality headquarters

Mogadishu's municipal government is led by Omar Mohamud Mohamed (Finnish), who succeeded the late mayor Abdirahman Omar Osman (Yariisow) in August 2019 after Osman was killed in a suicide bomb attack that targeted his office.

Among the administration's development initiatives are a US$100 million urban renewal project, the creation of garbage disposal and incineration plants, the launch of a citywide cleanup project, the creation of asphalt and cement plants, rehabilitation of the Town Hall and parliament buildings, reconstruction of the former Defence Ministry offices, reconstruction of correctional facilities, rehabilitation and construction of health facilities, establishment of a Police Training Center and a permanent base in Jasiira for the new Somali Armed Forces, rebuilding of the Somali Postal Service headquarters, and rehabilitation of public playgrounds in several districts. In January 2014, the Benadir administration launched the House Numbering and Post Code System. It also began distributing national identity cards in March of the same year. In addition, the municipal authorities started renovating important local government centers in September 2014, including the capital's former Fisho Guverno compound. In January 2015, the Benadir administration also opened a new Health & Safety Office to supervise health and safety practices in the city, and launched a municipal beautification campaign ahead of various international conferences that are slated to be held there.

In March 2015, the Benadir administration completed the Sustainable Employment Creation and Improved Livelihoods for Vulnerable Urban Communities (SECIL) project in conjunction with the EU and UN–Habitat. The 3.5 million EUR initiative lasted three and a half years, and saw the establishment in Mogadishu of a sustainable waste collection system, a technical training centre, water quality testing laboratories, better access to clean drinking water, improved employment and livelihood opportunities in the low-cost fuel production sector, strengthened skills training and regulation in the construction sector, and laboratories for the testing of construction material quality.

=== Diplomatic missions ===
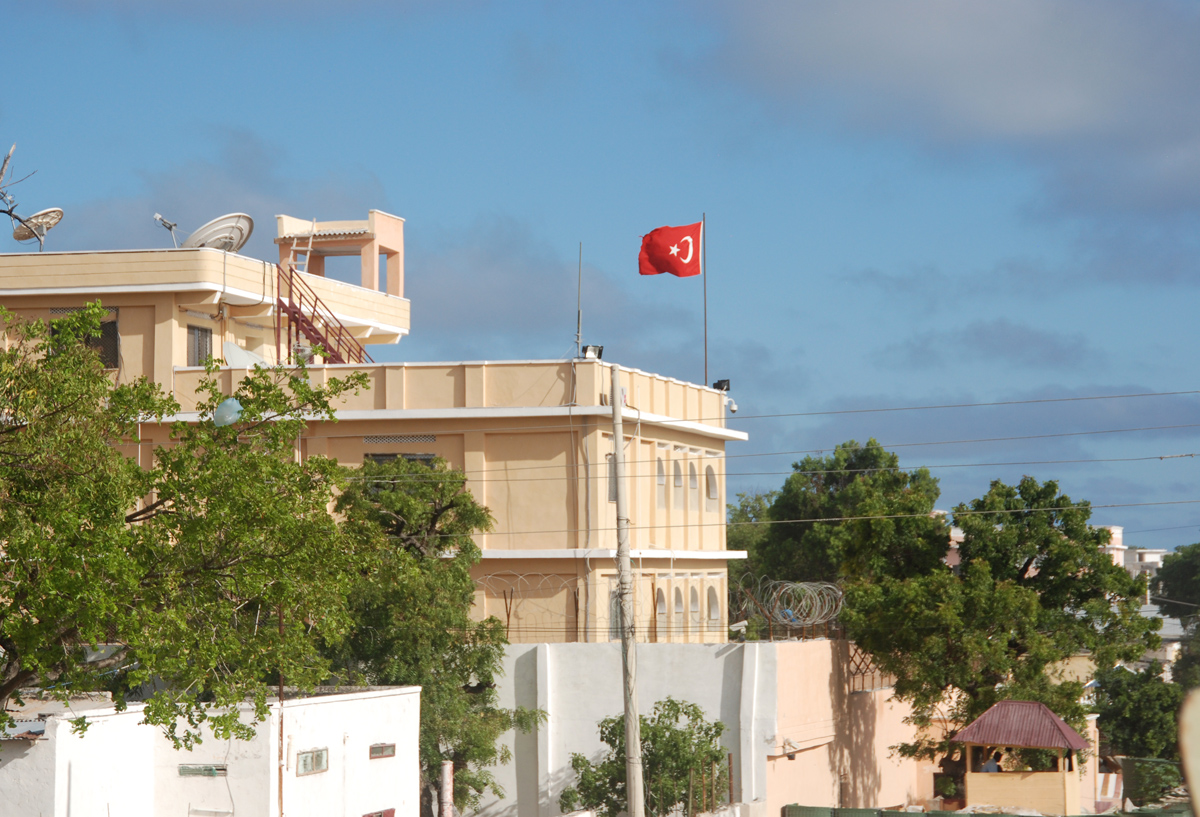
Turkey's embassy in Mogadishu

A number of countries maintain foreign embassies and consulates in Mogadishu. As of January 2014, these diplomatic missions include the embassies of Djibouti, Ethiopia, Sudan, Libya, Yemen, Saudi Arabia, Turkey, Iran, Uganda, Nigeria, the United Kingdom, Japan, China, and Qatar. Embassies that are scheduled to reopen in the city include those of Egypt, the United Arab Emirates, Italy and South Korea.

In May 2015, in recognition of the sociopolitical progress made in Somalia and its return to effective governance, US Secretary of State John Kerry announced a preliminary plan to reestablish the US embassy in Mogadishu. He indicated that although there was no set timetable for the premises' relaunch, the US government had immediately begun upgrading its diplomatic representation in the country. President of Somalia Hassan Sheikh Mohamud and Prime Minister Omar Abdirashid Ali Sharmarke also presented to Kerry the real estate deed for land reserved for the new US embassy compound. Mohamud concurrently signed an Establishment Agreement with the EU Head of Delegation in Somalia Michele Cervone d’Urso, which facilitates the opening of more embassies in Mogadishu by European Union member states. The EU also announced that it had opened a new EU Delegation office in the city.

In February 2014, Somalia's Minister of Foreign Affairs and International Cooperation Abdirahman Duale Beyle announced that the federal government was slated to reopen the former Institute of Diplomacy in Mogadishu. The centre historically served as one of the most important national institutions for diplomacy and international relations. Beyle also pledged to reestablish the institute's diplomacy department, its information and broadcasting department, as well as its library.

== Economy ==
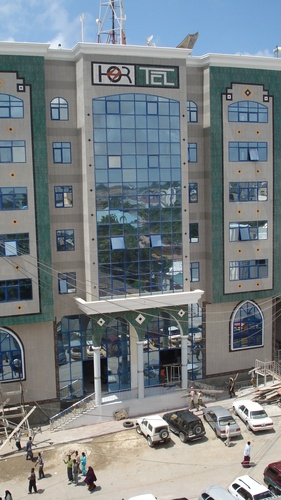
Hormuud Telecom is one of many firms with headquarters in Mogadishu

Mogadishu traditionally served as a commercial and financial centre. Before the importation of mass-produced cloth from Europe and America, the city's textiles were forwarded throughout the interior of the continent, as well as to the Arabian Peninsula and as far as the Persian coast.

Mogadishu's economy has grown rapidly since the city's pacification in mid-2011. The SomalFruit processing factory was reopened once again, as well as the local Coca-Cola factory, which was also refurbished. In May 2012, the First Somali Bank was established in the capital, representing the first commercial bank to open in southern Somalia since 1991. The Somali civil engineer and entrepreneur Nasra Agil opened the city's first Dollar store. The Historic Central Bank was regenerated, with the Moumin Business Centre likewise under construction.

The galvanization of Mogadishu's real estate sector was in part facilitated by the establishment of a local construction yard in November 2012 by the Municipality of Istanbul and the Turkish Red Crescent. 50 construction trucks and machines were imported from Turkey. The yard produces concrete, asphalt and paving stones for building projects and entrepreneurs. The Istanbul Municipality was also scheduled to bring in 100 specialists to accelerate the construction initiative which ultimately aims to modernize the capital's infrastructure.

In mid-2012, Mogadishu held its first ever Technology, Entertainment, Design (TEDx) conference. The event was organized by the FirstSomali Bank to showcase improvements in business, development and security to potential Somali and international investors. A second consecutive TEDx entrepreneurial conference was held the following year in the capital, highlighting new enterprises and commercial opportunities, including the establishment of the city's first dry cleaning business in several years. A number of large firms have their headquarters in Mogadishu. Among these is the Trans-National Industrial Electricity and Gas Company, an energy conglomerate founded in 2010 that unites five major Somali companies from the trade, finance, security and telecommunications sectors. Other firms based in the city include Hormuud Telecom, the largest telecommunications company in southern and central Somalia. Telcom is another telecommunications service provider that is centered in the capital. The local Somali Energy Company specializes in the generation, transmission and distribution of electric power to residents and businesses within its service area in Banaadir. Villa and Mansion Architects, an international architectural firm founded by the Somali-British architect Alexander Yusuf has its regional offices in Mogadishu. The International Bank of Somalia, which opened downtown in 2014, offers Islamic finance and international banking services via a swift code system. The Islamic Insurance Company (First Takaful and Re-Takaful Insurance Company) is the city's first full service insurance firm in many years. The Central Bank of Somalia, the national monetary authority, also has its headquarters in Mogadishu.

In June 2013, former Prime Minister Abdi Farah Shirdon signed a new foreign investment law. The draft bill was prepared by the Ministry of Commerce and Industry in conjunction with government attorneys. Approved by the Cabinet, it establishes a secure legal framework for foreign investment in Mogadishu and elsewhere in the country.

In October 2014, Tawakal Money Express (Tawakal) began construction of the seven-storey Tawakal Plaza Mogadishu. The new high rise is slated to be completed by the end of 2015, and will feature a Tawakal Global Bank customer and financial services center, a large, 338 square meter supermarket, a 46-room luxury hotel, restaurant and coffee shop facilities, and conference and event halls. In addition, the Nabaad Supermarket provides major retail service to local shoppers. Open daily until 10 pm, the convenience chain imports most of its products from the United Arab Emirates and China. The Al Buruuj firm also launched a major real estate project in January 2015, Daru-Salam City. Financed by the Salaam Somali Bank, the new urban complex includes town houses, apartment flats, a mosque, recreational areas, playgrounds, a supermarket and roads. It is slated to be erected just outside the northern part of the capital, within a 7 km (4.3 mi) radius of the Industrial Road.

== Landmarks ==
=== Places of worship ===
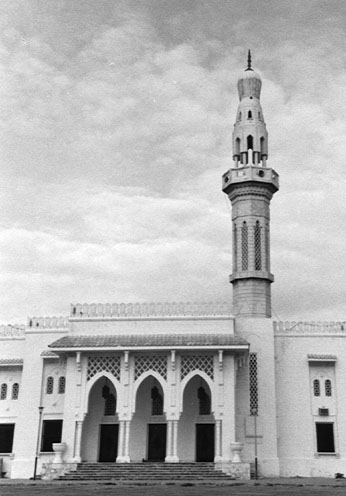
The Mosque of Islamic Solidarity is the largest masjid in the Horn of Africa

Among the places of worship, they are predominantly Muslim mosques.

Arba'a Rukun Mosque is one of the oldest Islamic places of worship in the capital. It was built circa 667 (1268–9 AD) along with the Fakr ad-Din Mosque. Arba'a Rukun's mihrab contains an inscription dated from the same year, which commemorates the masjid's late founder, Khusra ibn Mubarak al-Shirazi (Khusrau ibn Muhammed).

The Mosque of Islamic Solidarity was constructed in 1987 with financial support from the Saudi Fahd bin Abdul Aziz Al Saud Foundation. It is the main mosque in the city, and an iconic building in Somali society. With a capacity of up to 10,000 worshippers, it is the single largest masjid in the Horn region. In 2015, the federal authorities completed formal refurbishments on the mosque's infrastructure. The upgrades are part of a larger governmental renovation campaign aimed at all of the masjids in Mogadishu. To this end, the municipal authority is refurbishing the historic Central Mosque, situated downtown.

The Mogadishu Cathedral was built in 1928 by the colonial authorities in Italian Somaliland. Known as the "Cattedrale di Mogadiscio", it was constructed in a Norman Gothic style, based on the Cefalù Cathedral in Cefalù, Sicily. The church served as the traditional seat of the Roman Catholic Diocese of Mogadiscio. It later incurred significant damage during the civil war. In April 2013, after a visit to the site to inspect its condition, the Diocese of Mogadiscio announced plans to refurbish the building.

=== Palaces ===
Villa Somalia is the official residential palace and principal workplace of the President of Somalia, Hassan Sheikh Mohamud. It sits on high ground that overlooks the city on the Indian Ocean, with access to both the harbour and airport.

The Governor's Palace of Mogadishu was the seat of the governor of Italian Somaliland, and then the administrator of the Trust Territory of Somalia.

=== Museums, libraries and theatres ===
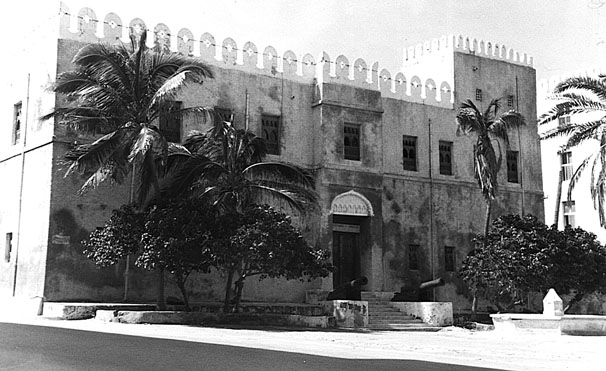
Old fort used as National Museum of Somalia

The National Museum of Somalia was established after independence in 1960, when the old Garesa Museum was turned into a National Museum. The National Museum was later moved in 1985, renamed to the Garesa Museum, and converted to a regional museum. After shutting down, the National Museum later reopened. As of January 2014, it holds many culturally important artefacts, including old coins, bartering tools, traditional artwork, ancient weaponry and pottery items.

The National Library of Somalia was established in 1975, and came under the responsibility of the Ministry of Education, Culture and Higher Education. In 1983, it held approximately 7,000 books, little in the way of historical and cultural archival material, and was open to the general public. The National Library later closed down in the 1990s. In June 2013, the Heritage Institute for Policy Studies organized a shipment of 22,000 books from the United States to Somalia as part of an initiative to restock the library. In December of the year, the Somali authorities officially launched a major project to rebuild the National Library. With Zainab Hassan serving as Director, the $1 million federal government-funded initiative will see a new library complex built in the capital within six months. In preparation for the relaunch, 60,000 additional books from other Arab League states are expected to arrive.

The National Theatre of Somalia opened in 1967 as an important cultural landmark in the national capital. It closed down after the start of the civil war in the early 1990s but reopened in March 2012 after reconstruction. In September 2013, the Somali federal government and its Chinese counterpart signed an official cooperation agreement in Mogadishu as part of a five-year national recovery plan in Somalia. The pact will see the Chinese authorities reconstruct the National Theatre of Somalia in addition to several other major infrastructural landmarks. A large part of Somalia's rich history remains at risk of disappearance with the lack of proper storage and archival system. At Radio Mogadishu, for example, over 200,000 tapes of records are dumped in a storeroom. If these analogue tapes are not digitized, they could be damaged to the point when it is impossible to recover them.

=== Markets ===
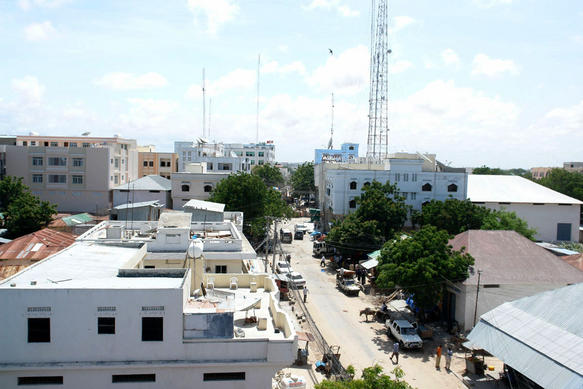
Bakaara Market in the heart of Mogadishu

Bakaara Market was created in late 1972 by the Barre administration. It served as an open market for the sale of goods and services, including produce and clothing. After the start of the civil war, the market was controlled by militant groups, who used it as a base for their operations. Following Mogadishu's pacification in 2011, renovations resumed at the market. Shops were rehabilitated, selling everything from fruit and garments to building materials. As in the rest of the city, Barkaara Market's real estate values have also risen considerably. As of 2013, the local Tabaarak firm was renting out a newly constructed warehouse at the market for $2,000 per month.

In February 2014, the Benadir administration began renovations at the Ansaloti Market in the Hamar Jajab district. It was one of the largest markets in the city before closing down operations in the early 1990s. In September 2014, the municipal authorities reopened the Ansaloti to the public, with officials supervising all parts of the market. According to the Benadir Political Affairs vice-chairman Mohamed Adan "Anagel", the facility is now open for business and will compete with other regional markets.

=== Institutes ===
The Regional Somali Language Academy is an intergovernmental regulating body for the Somali language in the Horn region. In January 2015, President of Somalia Hassan Sheikh Mohamud announced that the institute was slated to be finalized in conjunction with the governments of Djibouti and Ethiopia. Among the scheduled projects was the construction of a new headquarters for the academy in Mogadishu, in recognition of Somalia's traditional position as the centre for the development and promotion of the Somali language. In February 2015, the foundation stone for the new Regional Somali Language Academy was officially laid at an inauguration ceremony in the city.

=== Hotels ===
Mogadishu has a number of hotels, most of which were recently constructed. The city's many returning expatriates, investors and foreign workers are among these establishments' main customers. To meet the growing demand, hotel representatives have also begun participating in international industry conferences, such as the Africa Hotel Investment Forum.

Among the new hotels is the six-floor Jazeera Palace Hotel. It was built in 2010 and opened in 2012. Situated within 300m of the Aden Adde International Airport, it has a 70-room capacity with a 70% occupancy rate. The hotel expects to host over 1,000 visitors by 2015, for which it plans to construct a larger overall building and conference facilities. A new landslide hotel within the airport itself is also slated to be completed by the end of the year.

Other hotels in the city include the Lafweyn Palace Hotel, Amira Castle Hotel, Sahafi Hotel, Hotel Nasa-Hablod, Oriental Hotel, Hotel Guuleed, Hotel Shamo, Peace Hotel, Aran Guest House, Muna Hotel, Hotel Taleex, Hotel Towfiq, Benadir Hotel, Ambassador Hotel, Kuwait Plaza Hotel, Safari Hotel Diplomat, Dayax Hotel, Safari Guesthouse and Bin Ali Hotel. The Posh Hotel was mostly destroyed by a suicide bomber in June 2017.

== Geography ==
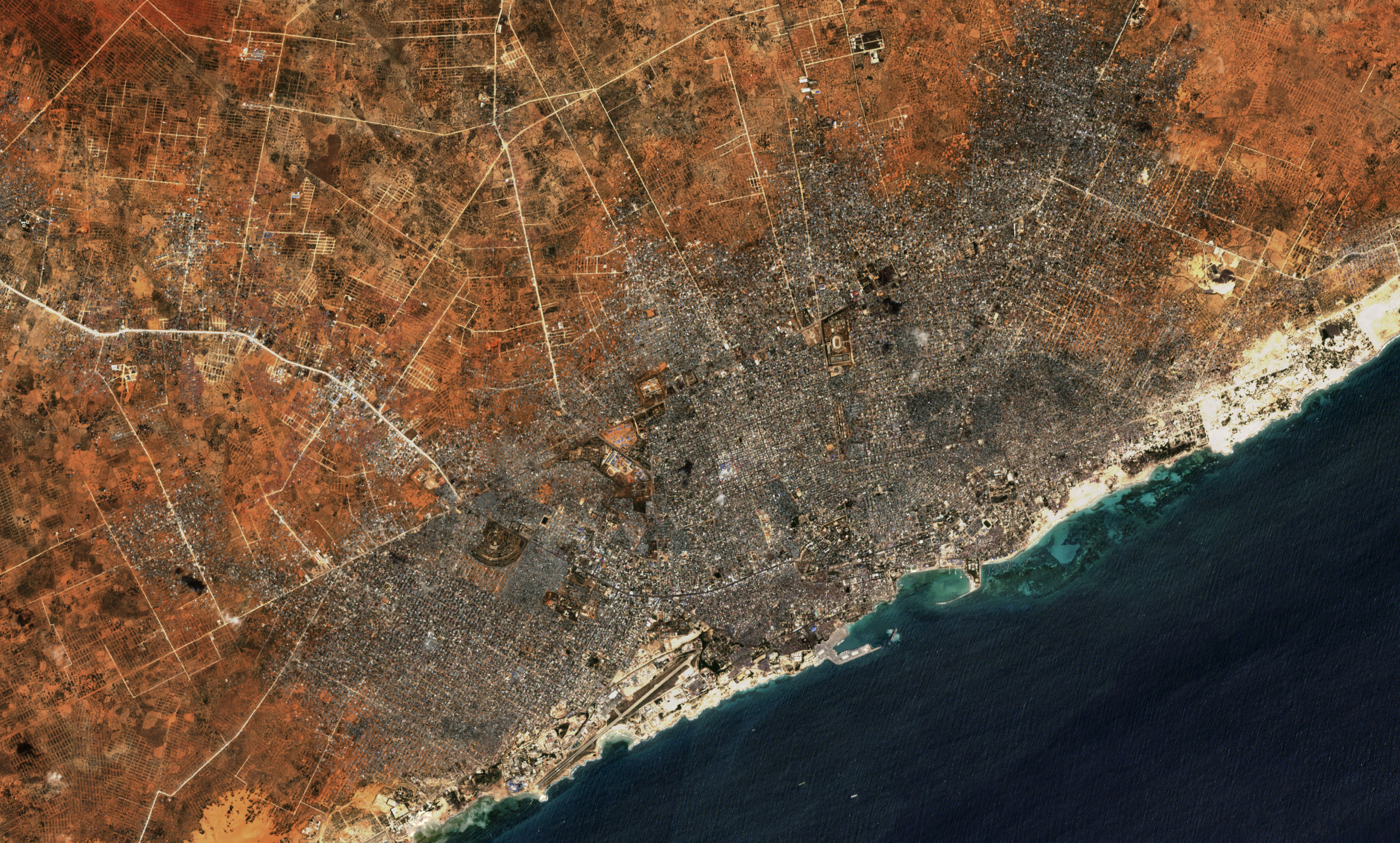
Mogadishu seen from space, 2020

Mogadishu is situated on the Indian Ocean coast of the Horn of Africa of Northeast Africa, in the Banaadir administrative region (gobol) in southeastern Somalia. The region itself is coextensive with the city and is much smaller than the historical province of Benadir. The city is administratively divided into eighteen districts of Abdiaziz, Bondhere, Daynile, Dharkenley, Hamar-Jajab, Hamar-Weyne, Heliwa, Hodan, Howl-Wadag, Karan, Shangani, Shibis, Waberi, Wadajir, Wardhigley and Yaqshid. Features of the city include the Hamarwein old town, the Bakaara Market, and Gezira Beach. The sandy beaches of Mogadishu have vibrant coral reefs, and are prime real estate for the first tourist resorts in many years.

The Shebelle River (Webiga Shabelle) rises in central Ethiopia and comes within 30 km (19 mi) of the Indian Ocean near Mogadishu before turning southwestward. Usually dry during February and March, the river provides water essential for the cultivation of sugarcane, cotton, and bananas.

=== Climate ===
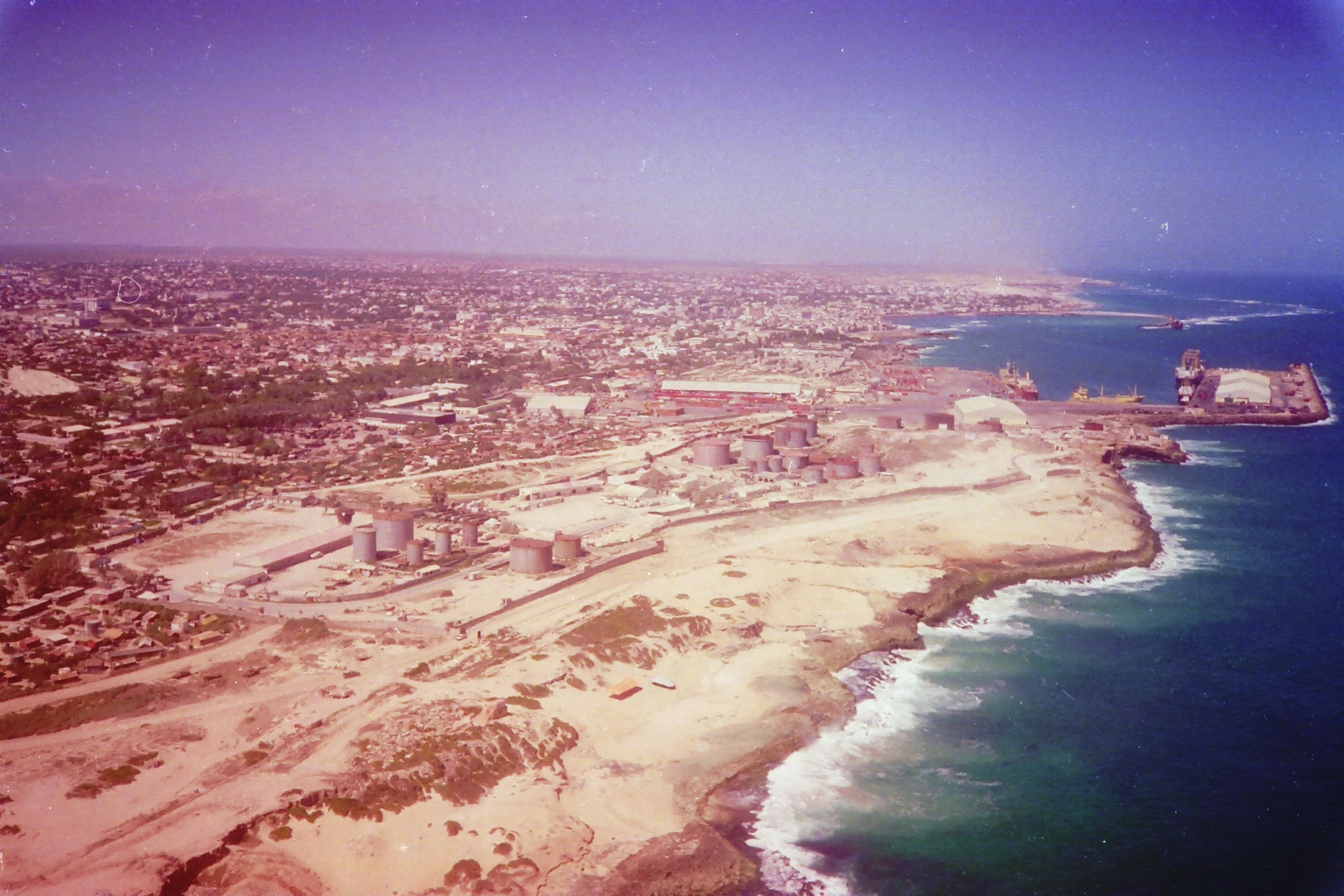
The Mogadishu beachfront

For a city situated so near the equator, Mogadishu has a dry climate. It is classified as hot and dry winter (winter is hotter than summer) semi-arid (Köppen climate classification (BSh), as with much of southeastern Somalia. Summer (Jun–Aug) is the coldest and rainiest season. By contrast, towns in northern Somalia generally have a hot arid climate (Köppen BWh). While the city is relatively dry, due to its coastal location, relative humidity is rather high, averaging 79% for the year.

Mogadishu is located in or near the tropical thorn woodland biome of the Holdridge global bioclimatic scheme. The mean temperature in the city year-round is 27 °C (81 °F), with an average maximum of 30 °C (86 °F) and an average minimum of 24 °C (75 °F). Mean temperature readings per month vary by 3 °C (5.4 °F), corresponding with a hyperoceanic and subtype truly hyperoceanic continentality type. Precipitation per year averages 429.2 mm (16.9 in). There are 47 wet days annually, which are associated with a 12% annual daily probability of rainfall. The city has an average of 3,066 hours of sunshine per year, with 8.4 hours of sunlight per day. Mean daylight hours and minutes per day are 8 hours and 24 minutes. The percentage of possible sunshine is 70%. Average sun altitude at solar noon on the 21st day of the month is 75%.

Climate data for Mogadishu
Month	Jan	Feb	Mar	Apr	May	Jun	Jul	Aug	Sep	Oct	Nov	Dec	Year
Record high °C (°F)	39.5 (103.1)	39.5 (103.1)	37.3 (99.1)	39.8 (103.6)	34.9 (94.8)	33.0 (91.4)	34.3 (93.7)	36.0 (96.8)	36.0 (96.8)	37.0 (98.6)	39.0 (102.2)	37.3 (99.1)	39.8 (103.6)
Mean daily maximum °C (°F)	30.2 (86.4)	30.2 (86.4)	30.9 (87.6)	32.2 (90.0)	31.2 (88.2)	29.6 (85.3)	28.6 (83.5)	28.6 (83.5)	29.4 (84.9)	30.2 (86.4)	30.6 (87.1)	30.8 (87.4)	30.2 (86.4)
Daily mean °C (°F)	26.6 (79.9)	26.9 (80.4)	28.0 (82.4)	28.9 (84.0)	28.2 (82.8)	26.7 (80.1)	25.4 (77.7)	25.9 (78.6)	26.5 (79.7)	27.3 (81.1)	27.5 (81.5)	26.9 (80.4)	27.1 (80.8)
Mean daily minimum °C (°F)	23.0 (73.4)	23.4 (74.1)	24.9 (76.8)	25.6 (78.1)	24.9 (76.8)	23.7 (74.7)	23.1 (73.6)	23.0 (73.4)	23.4 (74.1)	24.3 (75.7)	24.2 (75.6)	23.5 (74.3)	23.9 (75.0)
Record low °C (°F)	19.0 (66.2)	19.2 (66.6)	19.4 (66.9)	18.0 (64.4)	18.4 (65.1)	18.0 (64.4)	16.8 (62.2)	18.0 (64.4)	18.0 (64.4)	17.5 (63.5)	16.2 (61.2)	16.5 (61.7)	16.2 (61.2)
Average precipitation mm (inches)	0 (0)	0 (0)	8 (0.3)	61 (2.4)	61 (2.4)	82 (3.2)	64 (2.5)	44 (1.7)	25 (1.0)	32 (1.3)	43 (1.7)	9 (0.4)	428 (16.9)
Average precipitation days (≥ 0.1 mm)	0.3	0.1	0.6	4.8	6.7	12.7	13.3	10.2	4.9	3.9	4.1	1.5	63.0
Average relative humidity (%)	78	78	77	77	80	80	81	81	81	80	79	79	79
Mean monthly sunshine hours	266.6	251.4	282.1	261.0	272.8	219.0	226.3	254.2	264.0	266.6	261.0	257.3	3,082.3
Mean daily sunshine hours	8.6	8.9	9.1	8.7	8.8	7.3	7.3	8.2	8.8	8.6	8.7	8.3	8.4
Percentage possible sunshine	72	74	73	71	72	59	59	67	72	72	72	70	69
Source 1: Deutscher Wetterdienst
Source 2: Food and Agriculture Organization: Somalia Water and Land Management (percent sunshine)

== Demographics ==
Historical population
Year	Pop.	±%
1936	50,000	—
1941	72,000	+44.0%
1944	72,000	+0.0%
1947	73,000	+1.4%
1950	55,000	−24.7%
1953	63,000	+14.5%
1956	75,000	+19.0%
1959	104,332	+39.1%
1962	116,222	+11.4%
1965	171,312	+47.4%
1968	172,700	+0.8%
1972	230,000	+33.2%
1982	500,000	+117.4%
1984	570,000	+14.0%
1991	1,100,000	+93.0%
2017	2,425,000	+120.5%
Sources: Italian Somaliland, British Military Administration, United Nations and Mogadishu municipal estimates and censuses; Population size may be affected by changes on administrative divisions.

Mogadishu is inhabited by All Somali clan-families, with the most dominated being the Abgaal and Murusade clans. Apart from the Somalis that have inhabited the city since the beginning, several minorities have also historically lived in the city. With the beginning of Islam, Arab and Persian migrants began to settle during the medieval period. Centuries of intermarriage between the various ethnic groups, which also include Bantus, produced a minority people called Benadiris, or ‘Ad’ad (Somali: Cadcad), who mainly inhabit the oldest districts of Mogadishu. In the colonial period, European expatriates, primarily Italians, would also contribute to the city's cosmopolitan populace.

Following a greatly improved security situation in the city in 2012, Somali expatriates and many of the diaspora began returning to Mogadishu for investment opportunities and to take part in the post-conflict reconstruction. Through both private efforts and public initiatives like the Somali Diaspora Corps, they have participated in the renovation of schools, hospitals, banks and other infrastructure. They have also helped to propel the local real estate market. Since 2015, Mogadishu and many parts of the north of the country have seen a rise in refugees and migrants mainly those who are returning from Yemen or are from war torn Arab countries particularly those who are Yemenis and Syrians who are fleeing conflict.

According to Demographia, Mogadishu has a population of around 2,425,000 residents as of April 2017. It is the 210th largest city in the world by population size. The urban area occupies 91 km^{2} (35 sq mi), with a population density of around 26,800/km^{2} (69,000/sq mi). The UNFPA assisted the Ministry in the project, which is slated to be finalized ahead of the planned plebiscite and local and national elections in 2016.

== Education ==
Mogadishu is home to a number of scholastic institutions. As part of the government's urban renewal program, 100 schools across the country are scheduled to be refurbished and reopened. Compulsory education lasts 15 years, Primary and middle school is financed by the state and free of charge in public schools, between the ages of 7 and 19, and by 2015 enrollment of children in this age range was nearly 55%. Secondary or high school education is not mandatory but required to then progress to universities.

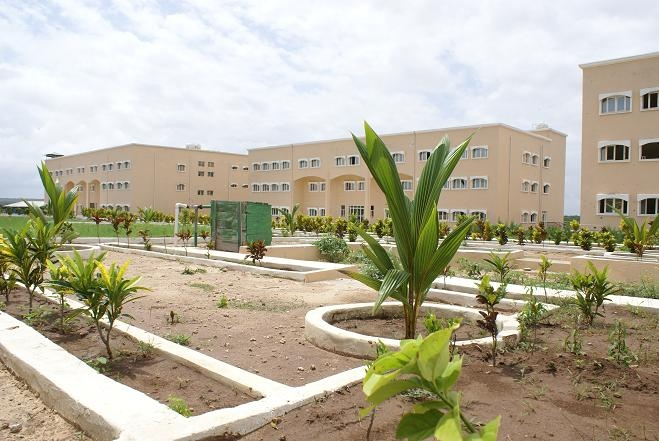
The Mogadishu University main campus

The Somali National University (SNU) was established in the 1950s, during the trusteeship period. In 1973, its programmes and facilities were expanded. The SNU developed over the next 20 years into an expansive institution of higher learning, with 13 departments, 700 staff and over 15,000 students. On 14 November 2013, the Cabinet unanimously approved a federal government plan to reopen the Somali National University, which had been closed down in the early 1990s. The refurbishing initiative cost US$3.6 million, and was completed in August 2014.

Mogadishu University (MU) is a non-governmental university that is governed by a board of trustees and a University Council. It is the brainchild of a number of professors from the Somali National University as well as other Somali intellectuals. Financed by the Islamic Development Bank in Jeddah, Saudi Arabia, as well as other donor institutions, the university counts hundreds of graduates from its seven faculties, some of whom continue on to pursue Master's degrees abroad thanks to a scholarship programme. Mogadishu University has established multiple partnerships with several other academic institutions, including the University of Aalborg in Denmark, three universities in Egypt, seven universities in Sudan, the University of Djibouti, and two universities in Yemen. As of 2012, MU also has accreditation with the Board of the Intergovernmental Organization EDU.

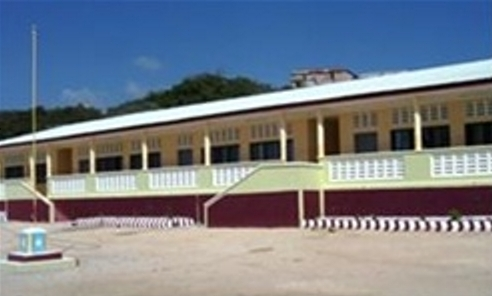
The Hamar Jajab School in Mogadishu

In 1999, the Somali Institute of Management and Administration (SIMAD) was co-established in Mogadishu by incumbent president of Somalia Hassan Sheikh Mohamud. The institution subsequently grew into the SIMAD University, with Mohamud acting as dean until 2010. It offers a range of undergraduate courses in various fields, including economics, statistics, business, accountancy, technology, computer science, health sciences, education, law and public administration.

Benadir University was established in 2002 with the intention of training doctors. It has since expanded into other fields. Another tertiary institution in the city is the Zamzam University of Science and Technology and Jamhuriya University of Science and Technology . The Turkish Boarding School was also established, with the Mogadishu Polytechnic Institute and Shabelle University campus likewise undergoing renovations. Additionally, a New Islamic University campus is being built. In April 2014, Prime Minister Abdiweli Sheikh Ahmed also laid the foundation stone for the reconstruction of the former meteorological school in Mogadishu. A new national Aviation Training Academy is likewise being built at the Aden Adde International Airport. This is the first of its kind.

City University was established in 2012 with the aim of providing instruction and research. The college is staffed by an accredited Master's-level faculty, and governed by a board of trustees consisting of academics and prominent entrepreneurs. City University's syllabus features a curriculum and foundation programs in English. Its campus includes physical and digital libraries, as well as IT and scientific laboratories. The university is a member of the Somali Research and Educational Network, and is authorized as a degree-granting institution by the national Ministry of Education Directorate of Higher Education and Culture. Other tertiary institutions in the capital include Zamzam University of Science and Technology. In 2012, Zamzam foundation started agricultural training school declared its purpose to be "rebuilding food production system of the country and accelerate its yield, while promoting income generation for low-income families". The School conducted 22 training programs during that period. in 2013 the Agricultural training school became Zamzam University of Science & Technology (ZUST). the first classes for the bachelor's degree September 2014, followed by the faculty of Medicine in 2015. Currently the ZUST has six faculties and centre for graduate studies. The permanent campus of the university is located in the KM11 Weydoow Mogadishu.

== Culture ==
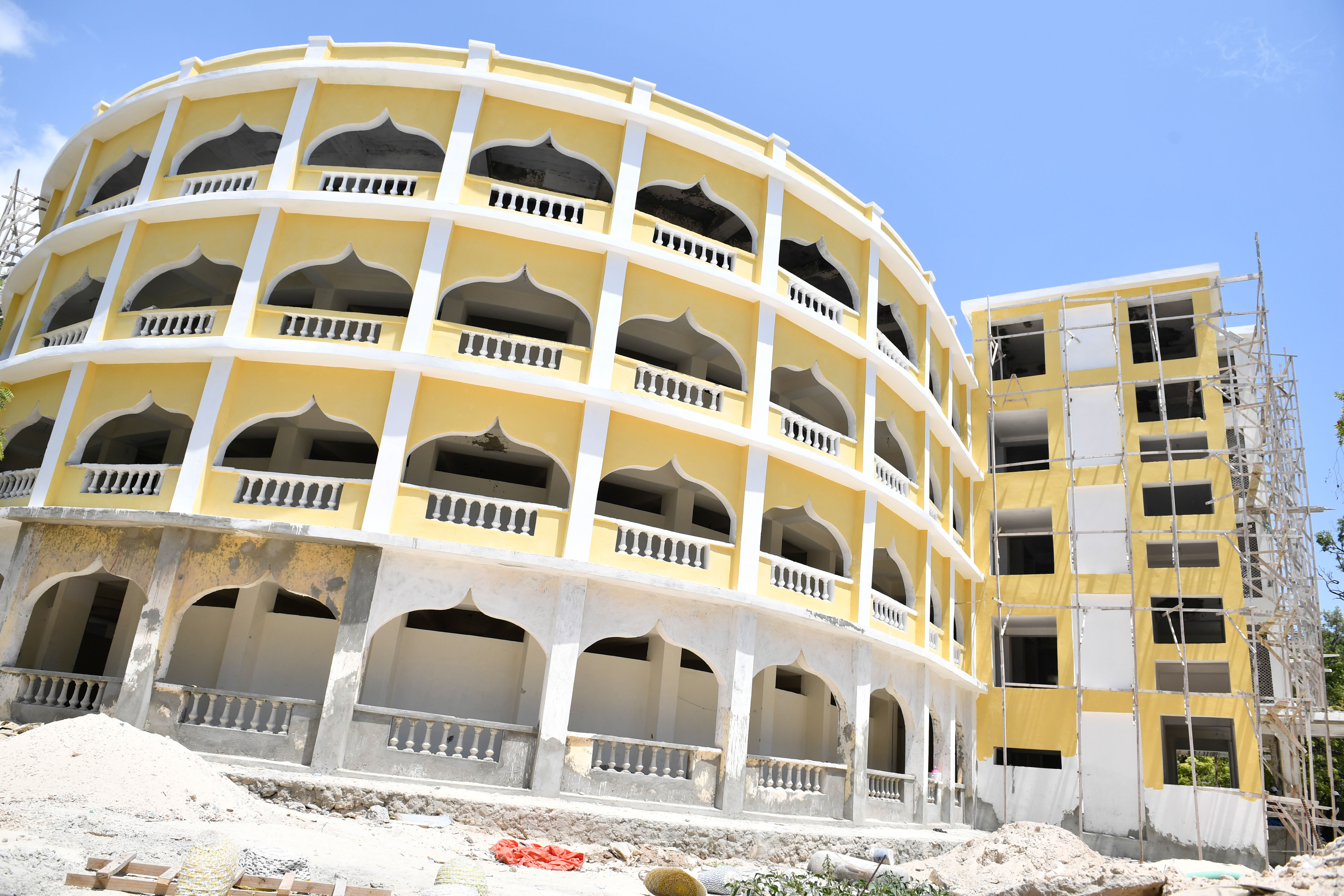
Somalia National Museum under renovation, February 2020

Mogadishu is the cultural heart of Somalia, hosting numerous important national institutions, landmarks, and scholastic centers.

=== Landmarks and institutions ===
The city is home to significant historical and cultural landmarks. The Arba'a Rukun Mosque, built circa AH 667 (1268–69 CE), is one of the oldest Islamic places of worship in the capital. The Mosque of Islamic Solidarity, built with funds from the Saudi government, is the largest masjid in the Horn region. The Mogadishu Cathedral was built in 1928 by the colonial authorities in Italian Somaliland in a Norman Gothic style; it was severely damaged during the civil war but remains an important landmark.

Key cultural institutions are also based in the city. The National Museum of Somalia, originally established in 1933, was rebuilt and officially reopened in 2020 after being destroyed in the civil war. The nearby National Library of Somalia has also undergone extensive renovation with the aim of preserving the nation's literary and historical records.

=== Sport ===
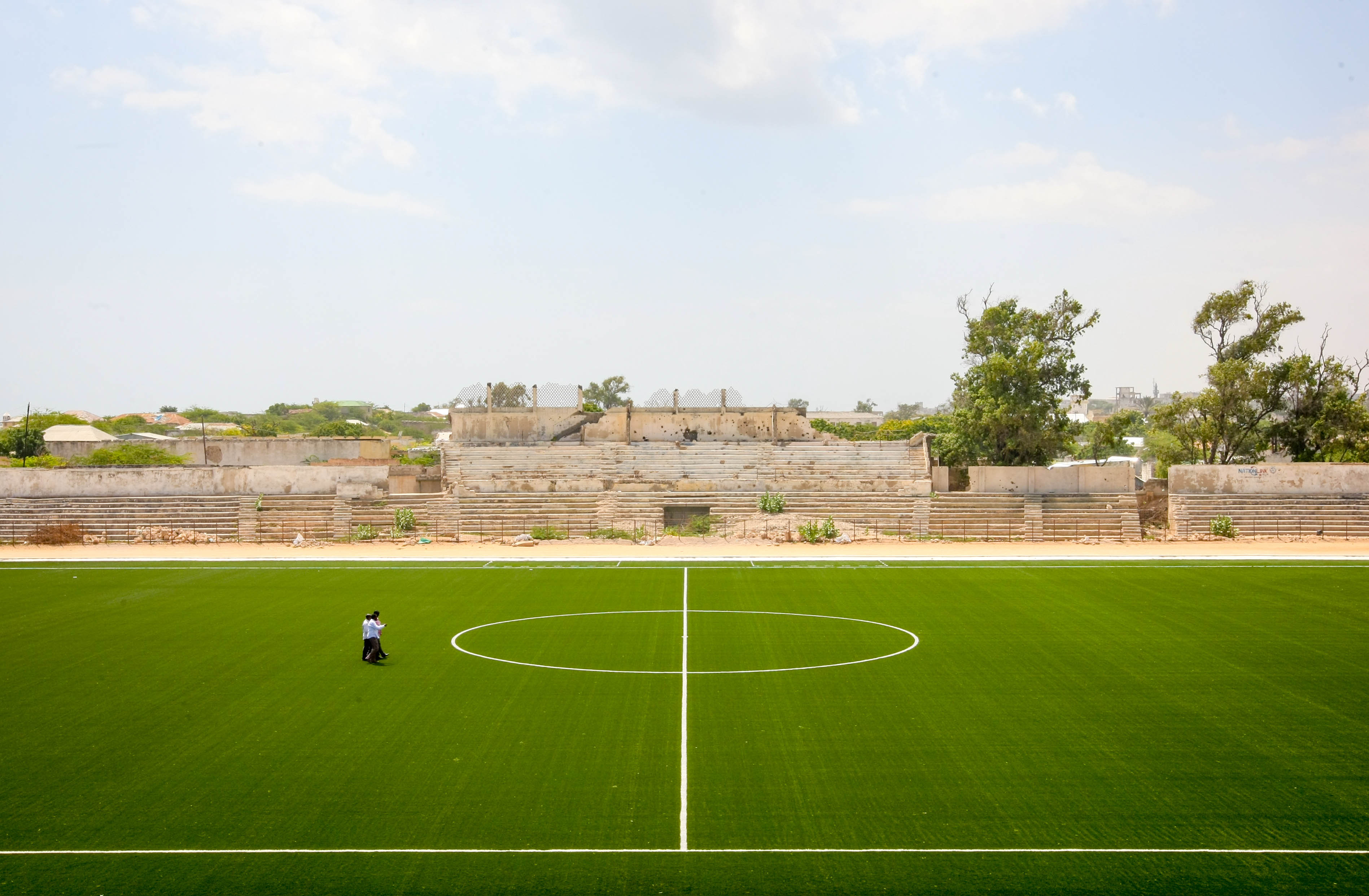
The Banadir Stadium being renovated

Mogadishu Stadium was constructed in 1978 during the Barre administration, with the assistance of Chinese engineers. The facility was mainly used for hosting sporting activities, such as the Somalia Cup and for football matches with teams from the Somalia League. Presidential addresses and political rallies, among other events, were also held there. In September 2013, the Somali federal government and its Chinese counterpart signed an official cooperation agreement in Mogadishu as part of a five-year national recovery plan in Somalia. The pact will see the Chinese authorities reconstruct several major infrastructural landmarks, including the Mogadishu Stadium.

The Banadir Stadium and Konis Stadium are two other major sporting facilities in the capital. In 2013, the Somali Football Federation launched a renovation project at the Konis facility, during which artificial football turf contributed by FIFA was installed at the stadium. The Ex-Lujino basketball stadium in the Abdulaziz District also underwent a $10,000 rehabilitation, with funding provided by the local Hormuud Telecom firm. Additionally, the municipal authority oversaw the reconstruction of the Banadir Stadium.

National sporting bodies have their headquarters in Mogadishu. Among these are the Somali Football Federation, Somali Olympic Committee and Somali Basketball Federation. The Somali Karate and Taekwondo Federation is likewise centered in the city, and manages the national Taekwondo team.

== Transportation ==
=== Road ===
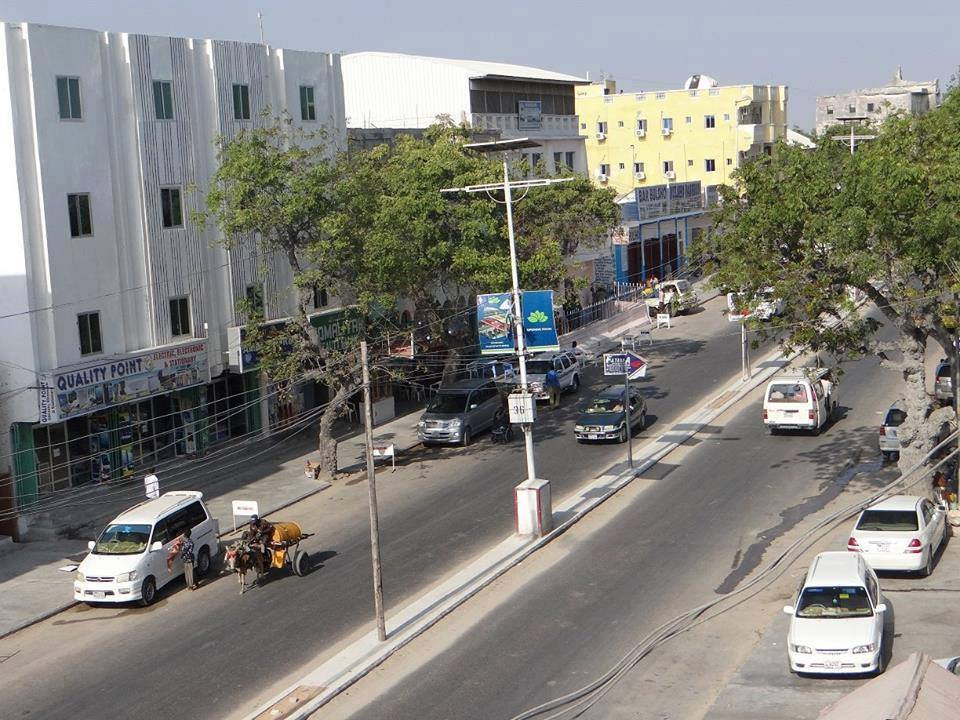
Newly constructed roads and buildings in Mogadishu (2015)

Roads leading out of Mogadishu connect the city to other localities in Somalia as well as to neighbouring countries. The capital itself is cut into several grid layouts by an extensive road network. In October 2013, major construction began on the 23-kilometer road leading to the airport. Overseen by Somali and Turkish engineers, the upgrade was completed in November and included lane demarcation. The road construction initiative was part of a larger agreement signed by the Somali and Turkish governments to establish Mogadishu and Istanbul as sister cities, and in the process bring all of Mogadishu's roads up to modern standards. Following the treaty, the Turkish International Cooperation and Development Agency (TIKA) launched a citywide cleaning project in conjunction with the municipal cleaning department. The initiative saw around 100 rubbish collection vehicles and other equipment operated by TIKA clean the city's roads, with the Benadir municipality taking over operation of the cleaning project in March 2015.

In 2012–2013, Mogadishu's municipal authority in conjunction with the British and Norwegian governments began a project to install solar-powered street lights on all of the capital's major roads. With equipment imported from Norway, the initiative cost around $140,000 and lasted several months. The solar panels have helped to improve night-time visibility and enhance the city's overall aesthetic appeal.

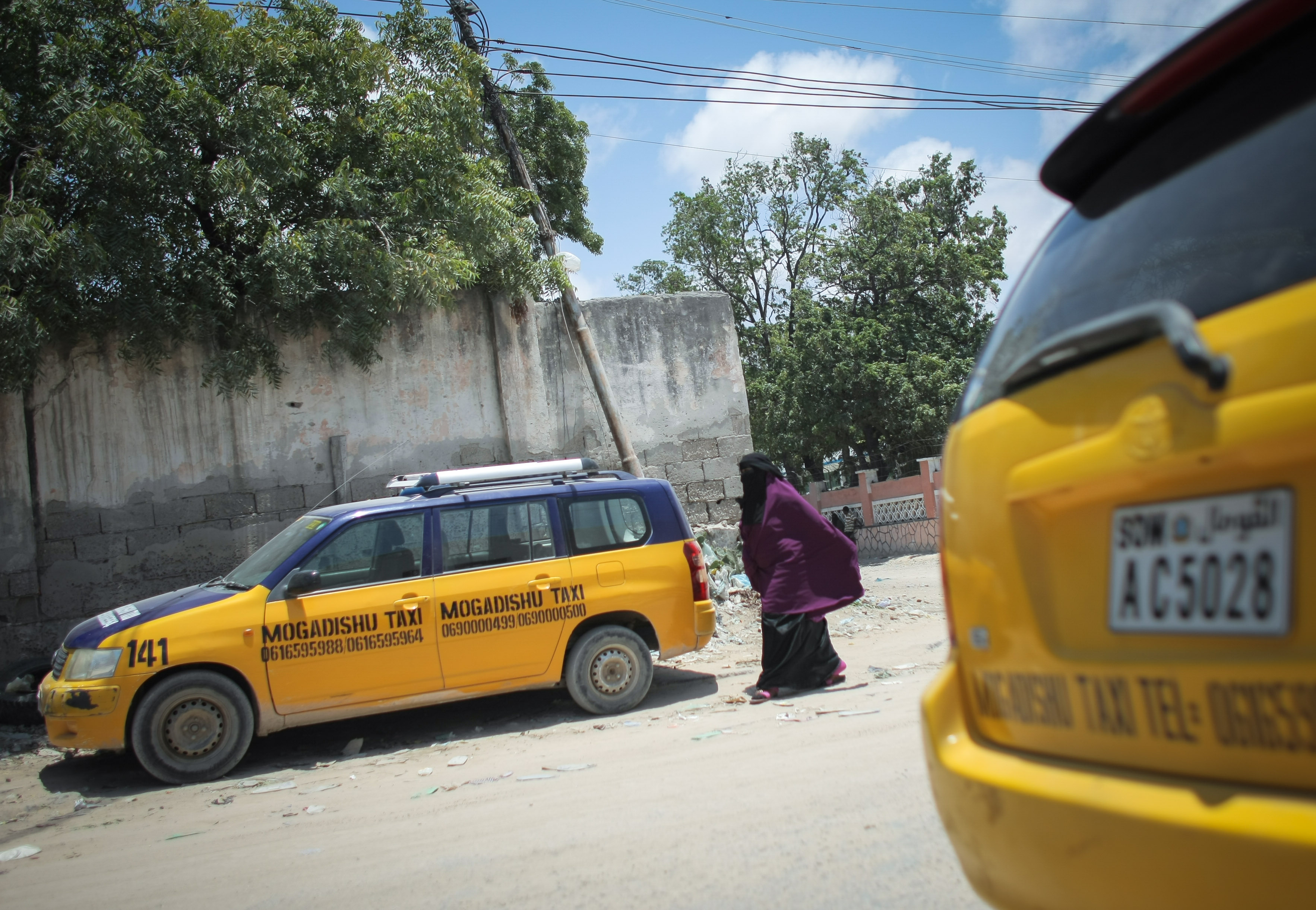
Mogadishu taxis

Minibuses are the most common type of public transportation in Mogadishu. The next most frequently used public vehicles in the city are auto rickshaws (bajaj). They number around 3,000 units and come in various designs. The auto-rickshaws represent a lower cost alternative to taxis and minibuses, typically charging half the price for the same distance, with flexible rates. Due to their affordability, capacity to negotiate narrow lanes and low fuel consumption, the three-wheeled vehicles are often appealing investment opportunities for small-scale entrepreneurs. They are generally preferred for shorter commutes. In June 2013, two new taxi companies also started offering road transportation to residents. Part of a fleet of over 100 vehicles, Mogadishu Taxi's trademark yellow cabs offer rides throughout the city at flat rates of $5. City Taxi, the firm's nearest competitor, charges the same flat rate, with plans to add new cabs to its fleet.

In January 2014, the Benadir administration launched a citywide street naming, house numbering and postal codes project. Officially called the House Numbering and Post Code System, it is a joint initiative of the municipal authorities and Somali business community representatives. According to former Mayor Mohamed Ahmed Nur, the initiative also aims to help the authorities firm up on security and resolve housing ownership disputes. In March 2015, the Benadir administration likewise launched a renovation project on the Hawo Asir-Fagah major road in Mogadishu. The government-public partnership aims to facilitate vehicle access in the area. According to Karaan district commissioner Ahmed Hassan Yalah'ow, the reconstruction initiative will also make the road all-weather resistant and is slated to be completed shortly.

=== Air ===
During the post-independence period, Mogadishu International Airport offered flights to numerous global destinations. In the mid-1960s, the airport was enlarged to accommodate more international carriers, with the state-owned Somali Airlines providing regular trips to many major cities. By 1969, the airport's many landing grounds could also host small jets and DC 6B-type aircraft.

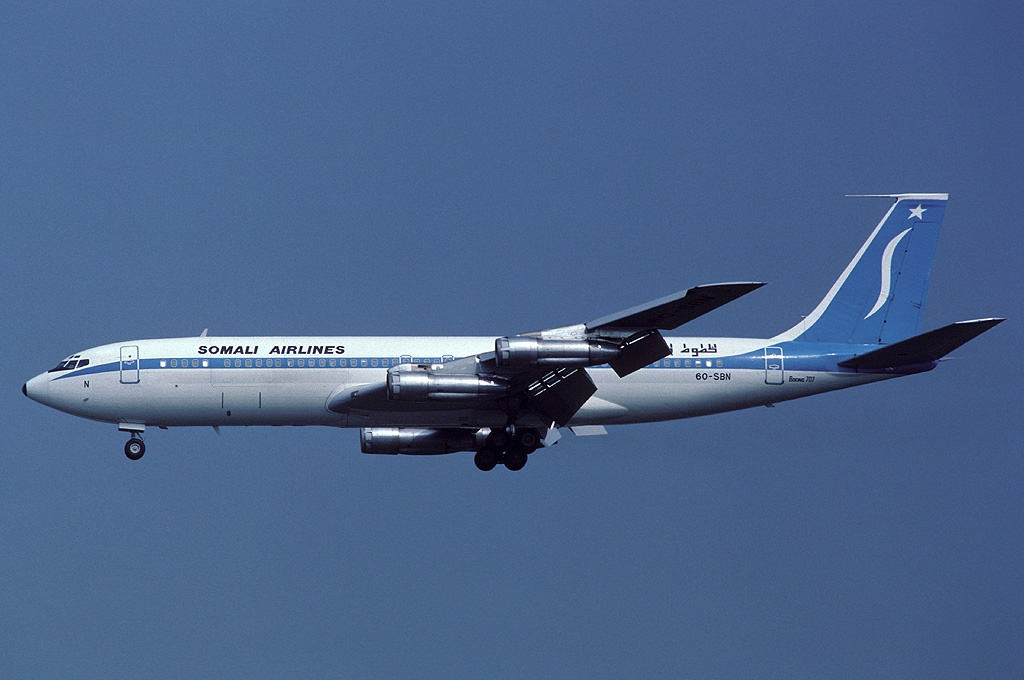
A Somali Airlines Boeing 707-338C in flight (1984). The Mogadishu-based national carrier was relaunched in late 2013.

The facility grew considerably in size in the post-independence period after successive renovation projects. With the outbreak of the civil war in the early 1990s, Mogadishu International Airport's flight services experienced routine disruptions and its grounds and equipment were largely destroyed. In the late 2000s, the K50 Airport, situated 50 kilometers to the south, served as the capital's main airport while Mogadishu International Airport, now renamed Aden Adde International Airport, briefly shut down. However, in late 2010, the security situation in Mogadishu had significantly improved, with the federal government eventually managing to assume full control of the city by August 2011.

In May 2011, the Ministry of Transport announced that SKA-Somalia had been contracted to manage operations at the re-opened Aden Adde International Airport over a period of ten years. Among its first initiatives, worth an estimated $6 million, SKA invested in new airport equipment and expanded support services by hiring, training and equipping 200 local workers to meet international airport standards. The company also assisted in comprehensive infrastructure renovations, restored a dependable supply of electricity, revamped the baggage handling facilities as well as the arrival and departure lounges, put into place electronic check-in systems, and firmed up on security and work-flow. Additionally, SKA connected the grounds' Somali Civil Aviation and Meteorological Agency (SCAMA) and immigration, customs, commercial airlines and Somali Police Force officials to the internet. By January 2013, the firm had introduced shuttle buses to ferry travelers to and from the passenger terminal.

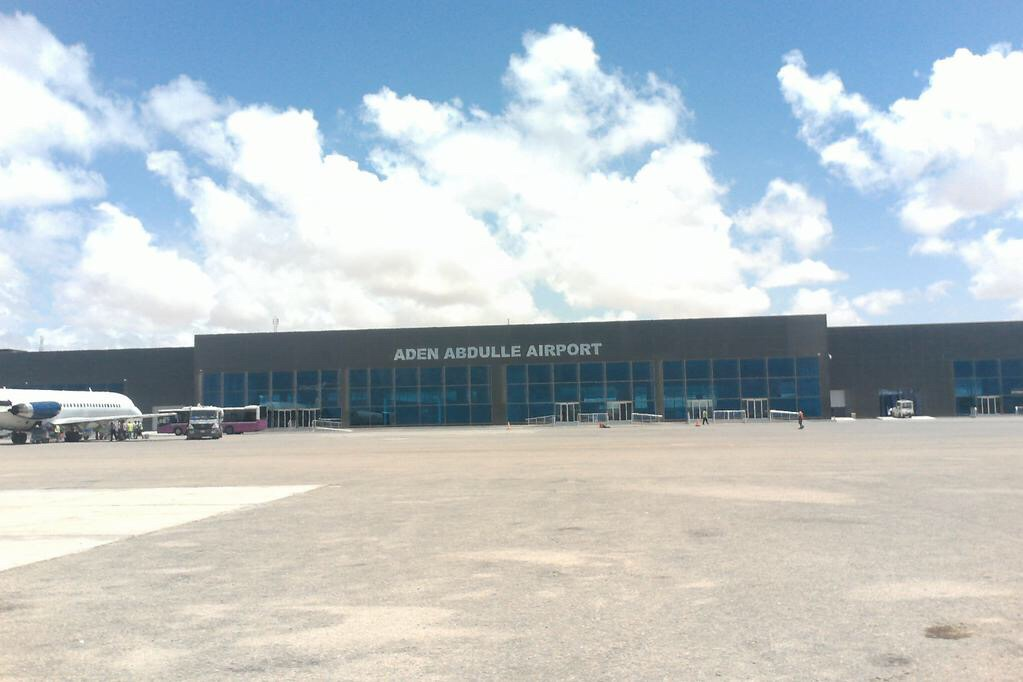
The Aden Adde International Airport

In December 2011, the Turkish government unveiled plans to further modernize the airport as part of Turkey's broader engagement in the local post-conflict reconstruction process. Among the scheduled renovations were new systems and infrastructure, including a modern control tower to monitor the airspace. In September 2013, the Turkish company Favori LLC began operations at the airport. The firm announced plans to renovate the aviation building and construct a new one, as well as upgrade other modern service structures. A$10 million project, it will increase the airport's existing 15 aircraft capacity to 60. In January 2015, a new, state-of-the-art terminal was opened at the airport. Featuring modern passenger facilities and a glass façade, it will enable the airport to double its number of daily commercial flights to 60, with a throughput of around 1,000 passengers per hour.

As of January 2015, the largest airline services using Aden Adde International Airport include the Somali-owned private carriers Jubba Airways, Daallo Airlines, and African Express Airways, in addition to UN charter planes, Turkish Airlines, The airport also offers flights to other cities in Somalia, such as Galkayo, Berbera and Hargeisa, as well as to international destinations like Djibouti, Jeddah, and Istanbul.

In July 2012, Mohammed Osman Ali (Dhagah-tur), the General Director of the Ministry of Aviation and Transport, also announced that the Somali government had begun preparations to revive the Mogadishu-based national carrier, Somali Airlines. The first new aircraft were scheduled for delivery in December 2013.

There is another international airport under construction, New Mogadishu International Airport.

=== Sea ===
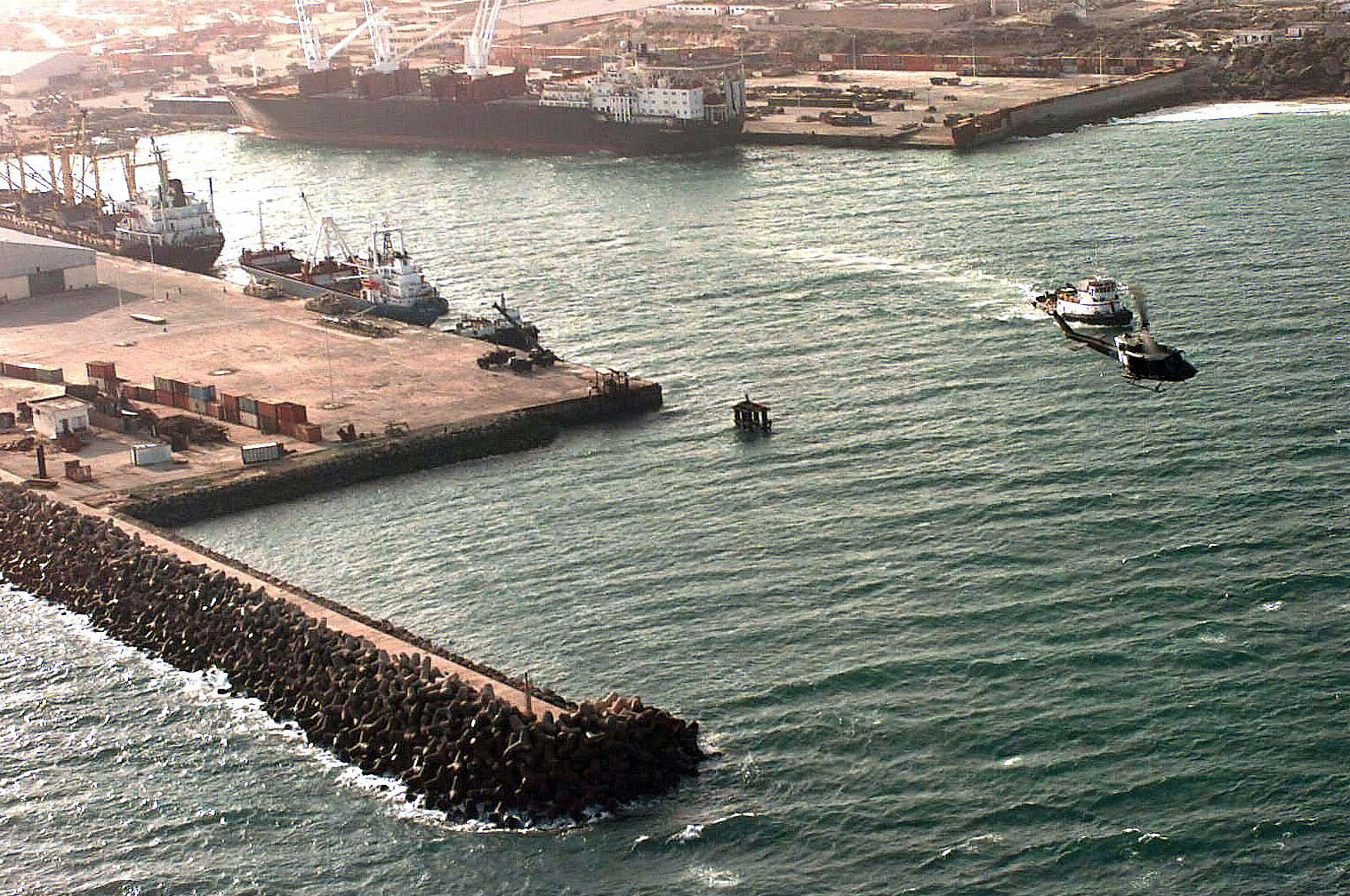
The Port of Mogadishu serves as a major national seaport.

The Port of Mogadishu, also known as the Mogadishu International Port, is the official seaport of Mogadishu. Classified as a major class port, it is the largest harbour in the country.

After incurring some damage during the civil war, the federal government launched the Mogadishu Port Rehabilitation Project, an initiative to rebuild, develop and modernize the port. The renovations included the installation of Alpha Logistics technology. A joint international delegation consisting of the Director of the Port of Djibouti and Chinese officials specializing in infrastructure reconstruction visited the facility in June 2013. According to Mogadishu Port manager Abdullahi Ali Nur, the delegates along with local Somali officials received reports on the port's functions as part of the rebuilding project's planning stages.

In 2013, the Port of Mogadishu's management reportedly reached an agreement with representatives of the Iranian company Simatech Shipping LLC to handle vital operations at the seaport. Under the name Mogadishu Port Container Terminal, the firm is slated to handle all of the port's technical and operational functions.

In October 2013, the federal Cabinet endorsed an agreement with the Turkish firm Al-Bayrak to manage the Port of Mogadishu for a 20-year period. The deal was secured by the Ministry of Ports and Public Works, and also assigns Al-Bayrak responsibility for rebuilding and modernizing the seaport. In September 2014, the federal government officially delegated management of the Mogadishu Port to Al-Bayrak. The firm's modernization project will cost $80 million.

=== Railway ===
There were projects during the 1980s to reactivate the 114 km (71 mi) railway between Mogadishu and Jowhar, built by the Italians in 1926 but dismantled in World War II by British troops. It was originally intended that this railway would reach Addis Ababa. Only a few remaining tracks inside Mogadishu's harbour area are still used.

== Media ==
Mogadishu has historically served as a media hub. In 1975, the Somali Film Agency (SFA), the nation's film regulatory body, was established in Mogadishu. The SFA also organized the annual Mogadishu Pan-African and Arab Film Symposium (Mogpaafis), which brought together an array of filmmakers and movie experts from across the globe, including other parts of Northeast Africa and the Arab world, as well as Asia and Europe.

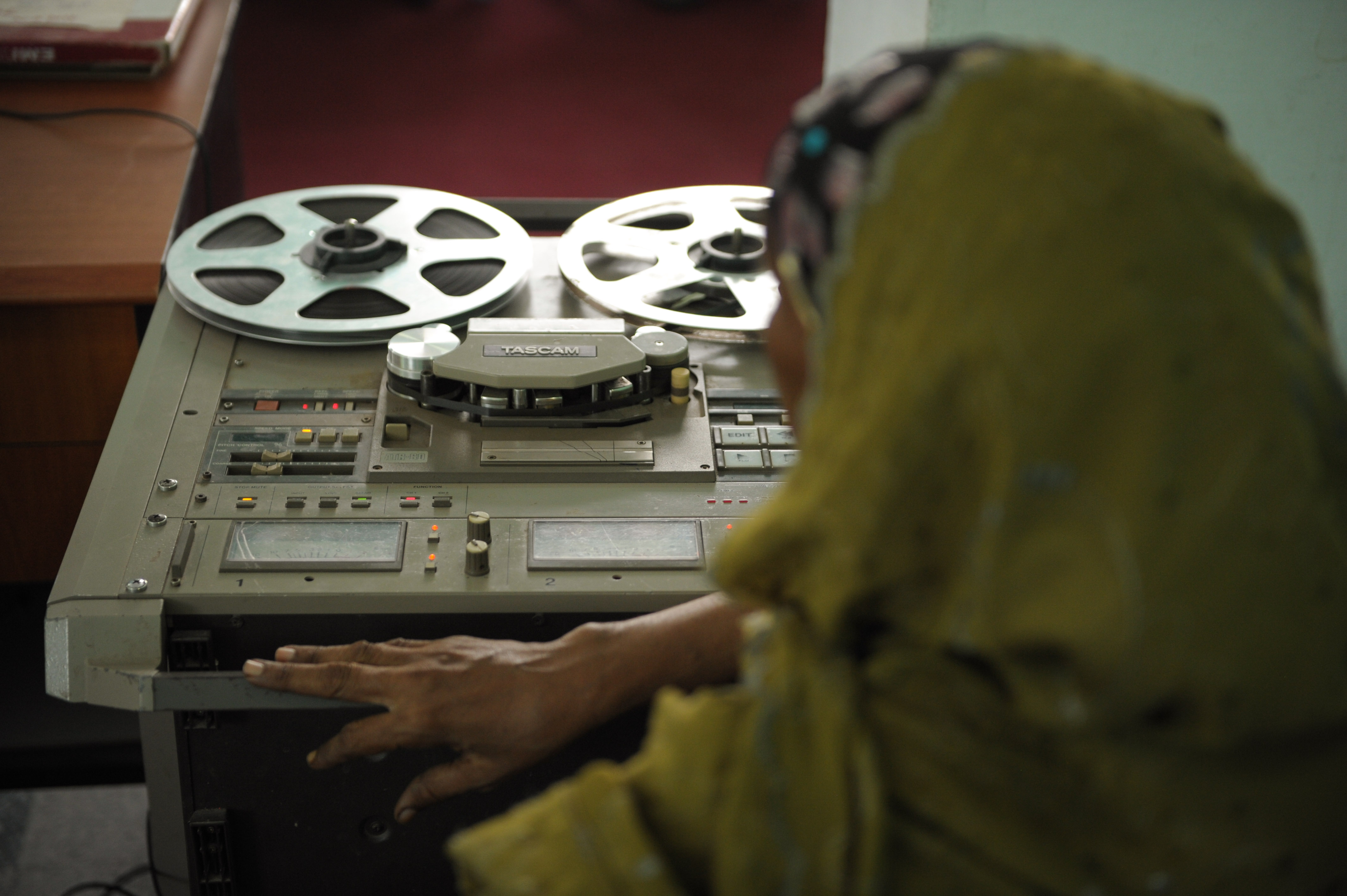
Radio Mogadishu analog-to-digital machine

In addition, there are a number of radio news agencies based in Mogadishu. Radio Mogadishu is the federal government-run public broadcaster. Established in 1951 in Italian Somaliland, it initially aired news items in both Somali and Italian. The station was modernized with Russian assistance following independence in 1960, and began offering home service in Somali, Amharic and Oromo. After closing down operations in the early 1990s due to the civil war, the broadcaster was officially re-opened in the early 2000s by the Transitional National Government. Other radio stations headquartered in the city include Mustaqbal Radio, Radio Shabelle, Radio Bar-Kulan, Radio Kulmiye, Radio Dannan, Radio Dalsan, Radio Banadir, Radio Maanta, Gool FM, Radio Xurmo, and Radio Xamar, also known as Voice of Democracy.

The Mogadishu-based Somali National Television (SNTV) is the central government-owned broadcaster. On 4 April 2011, the Ministry of Information of the Transitional Federal Government officially re-launched the station as part of an initiative to develop the national telecommunications sector. SNTV broadcasts 24 hours a day, and can be viewed both within Somalia and abroad via terrestrial and satellite platforms.

Somali popular music enjoys a large audience in Mogadishu, and was widely sold prior to the civil war. With the government managing to secure the city in mid-2011, radios once again play music. On 19 March 2012, an open concert was held in the city, which was broadcast live on local television. In April 2013, the Waayaha Cusub ensemble also organized the Reconciliation Music Festival, the first international music festival to be held in Mogadishu in two decades. Mogadiscio also includes the headquarters of Bilan Media, a Somali newspaper composed exclusively of women, founded in 2020 with the support of the United Nations Development Programme.

== Notable people ==
- Hassan Sheikh Mohamud, President of Somalia
- Sharif 'Aydarus Sharif Ali Al-Nudari, famous scholar of Islamic and Somali history and pan-Islamic leader
- Shaykh Sufi, 19th-century scholar, poet, reformist, astrologist
- Hawa Abdi, physician, social activist
- Yasmine Allas, actress, writer
- Faisal Jeylani Aweys, taekwondo practitioner
- Ayub Daud, footballer
- Cristina Ali Farah, author, intellectual
- Hassan Abshir Farah, MP, former Prime Minister of Somalia, former Mayor of Mogadishu
- Ali Mohammed Ghedi, former Prime Minister of Somalia
- Iman, model, actress, entrepreneur
- K'naan, musician
- Rageh Omaar, journalist
- Diriye Osman, writer, visual artist
- Fatima Siad, model
- Ladan Osman, poet
- Sa'id of Mogadishu, 14th-century Islamic scholar, traveler
- Mohamed Abdullahi Mohamed, former Prime Minister, President of Somalia
- Mustafa Mohamed, Swedish long-distance runner
- Mohamed Nur, former Mayor of Mogadishu
- Musse Olol, engineer, social activist
- Omar Abdirashid Ali Sharmarke, former Prime Minister of Somalia
- Samia Yusuf Omar, athlete who died while trying to cross the Mediterranean sea as a migrant to attend the 2012 Summer Olympics.
- Yasmin Warsame, model
- Omar Abdirashid Ali Sharmarke Former Somali Prime Minister
- Said Abdullahi Deni President of Puntland State of Somalia
- Abdulqawi Ahmed Yusuf Former President of International Court of Justice
- Ayaan Hirsi Ali, Dutch citizen. Former politician and member of the Dutch parliament, activist
- Saba Anglana, Italian citizen. Singer, actress
- Zahra Bani, Italian citizen. Javelin thrower
- Elisa Kadigia Bove, Italian citizen. Actress, activist
- Mo Farah, English citizen. Distance runner
- Abdi Nageeye, Dutch citizen. Long-distance runner
- Ilhan Omar, American citizen. U.S. Representative for Minnesota's 5th congressional district
- Linda Suleiman, orthopaedic surgeon
- Sadia Moalim Ali, human rights activist
