= Constitutional crisis in Somalia =

2024 constitutional crisis involving FGS and FMS

- Part of the Somali Civil War (2009–present)
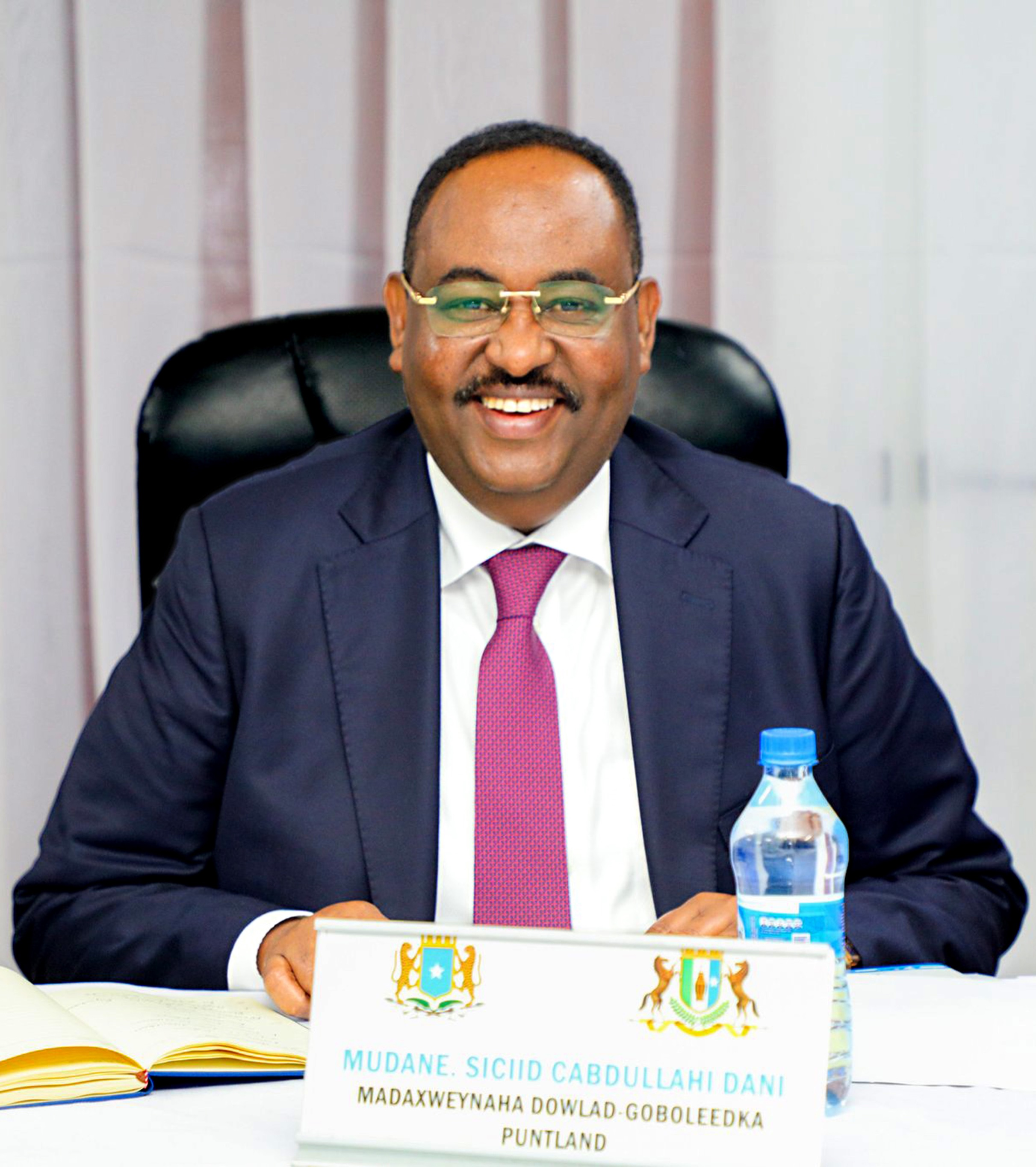
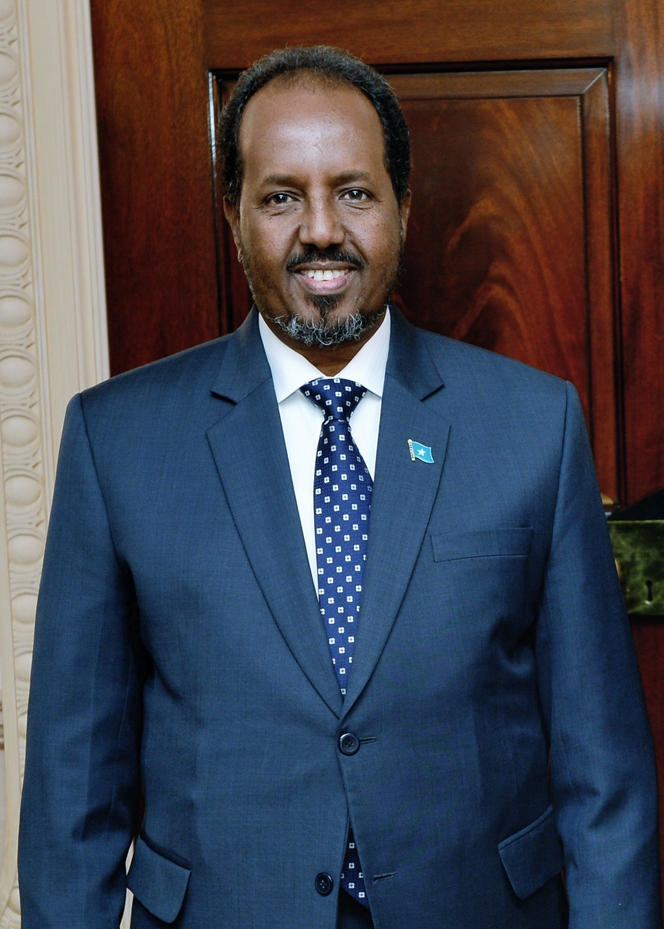
- Said Abdullahi Deni (President of Puntland) Hassan Sheikh Mohamud (disputed President of Somalia) (Note: The presidency has been disputed since 15 May 2026. Hassan Sheikh Mohamud has asserted that the constitutional amendments passed on 30 March 2024 mean that he continues to be the legitimate president until 15 May 2027. The opposition dispute the constitutional amendments as being invalid, stating that the constitutional term of Mohamud expired on 15 May 2026 in accordance with the provisional constitution of Somalia.)
- Date: 30 March 2024 – present (2 years, 7 months, 1 week and 2 days) (UTC+3)
- Location: Somalia
- Status: Ongoing: Puntland declares de facto independence and pulls recognition of the Federal Government of Somalia (FGS); Jubaland crisis; clashes break out throughout Jubaland after regional administration ends recognition of FGS; FGS establishes pro-government adminisration in Gedo District, while Jubaland forces capture southern districts; South West State ends recognition of FGS; clashes break out after FGS supports pro-government militias in Bakool; 2026 Mogadishu clashes

Parties
Somali Future Council; Puntland; Government of Puntland; Ministry of Security; Puntland Security Force; Puntland Dervish Force; Jubaland; Jubaland Dervish Force; Raskamboni Movement; (South West State of Somalia) South West State (March 2026); South West Liberation Front; (South West State of Somalia) Abdiaziz Laftagareen-loyalists	Federal Republic of Somalia; Federal Government of Somalia; Somali Armed Forces; Somali National Army; Banaadir; Galmudug; Galmudug security forces; Hirshabelle; (Khatumo) North Eastern State; North Eastern State security forces; (South West State of Somalia) South West State (until March 2026, 2026–present)

Lead figures
(Puntland) Said Deni; (Jubaland) Ahmed Madobe; (South West State of Somalia) Abdiaziz Laftagareen (From March 2026 on); (Somalia) Mohamed Abdullahi Mohamed; (Somalia) Sharif Sheikh Ahmed	(Somalia) Hassan Sheikh Mohamud; Yusuf Hussein Jimaale succeeded by Hassan Mohamed Hussein (2024): (South West State of Somalia) Ahmed Mohamed Husein; (South West State of Somalia) Jibril Abdirashid Haji Abdi

Casualties and losses
Puntland: 126–235 killed, 520+ injured Jubaland: 515 killed, 750+ injured (South West State of Somalia) : 981+ killed, 1,000+ injured	Somalia: more than 8,000 SNA officials, Police officers and Presidential guard killed since 2022 (Note: Since President Hassan Sheikh Mohamud took office in May 2022, ACLED reported more than 15,000 conflict-related constitutional crisis in Somalia. This total excludes thousands of civilians killed the war between Al-Shabaab insurgents and Somali National Army among Ma'awisley militia fighters)
- 15,000 civilians killed and more than 3.5 million displaced including forced eviction in Mogadishu

A constitutional crisis emerged in Somalia on 30 March 2024, when the Federal Parliament of Somalia approved a series of constitutional amendments aimed at establishing a more "stable political system". These changes included a return to universal suffrage, replacing the decades-old clan-based electoral system, and granting the president authority to appoint the prime minister without requiring parliamentary approval. Critics argued that the reforms significantly expanded executive power. In response, the semi-autonomous state of Puntland Government announced the following day that it was withdrawing its recognition and confidence in the Federal Government of Somalia. Puntland called for a "mutually accepted Somali constitution that is subject to a public referendum" and declared that, until such a constitution is in place, it would operate independently.

On 28 November 2024, the semi-autonomous government of Jubaland suspended relations and cooperation with the federal government after the latter issued an arrest warrant for Jubaland President Ahmed Madobe, accusing him of treason and revealing classified information to foreign entities.

By mid-2025, planned district-level elections had been postponed, with pilot direct elections rescheduled for Mogadishu in October 2025. State-level elections originally expected in 2025 were also delayed, also national parliamentary and presidential elections term expired without planning upcoming elections for 2026.

Executive President Hassan Sheikh Mohamud, both legislative chambers, and regional governments like Galmudug, Hirshabelle, and South West State were all given unconstitutional extensions of their terms.

== Background ==
The Provisional Constitution of the Federal Republic of Somalia, adopted in 2012, established a federal system of government consisting of two levels: the Federal Government of Somalia (FGS) and the semi-autonomous Federal Member States (FMS). Intended to prevent the reemergence of an authoritarian central government, such as that under former President Siad Barre, and to address historical grievances by devolving powers to member states, the provisional constitution provides limited provisions for implementing federalism, forcing the FGS to negotiate with the FMS. Coupled with the ambiguity of the document and disputes over power and resources, has led to competing interpretations of federal governance. Some state governments favor greater autonomy, even asserting control of powers designated for the FGS, while others support a stronger central government. These disagreements have contributed to recurring tensions between the federal and state governments over the past two decades.

=== Amendments ===
On 28 May 2023, following a four-day conference held in Mogadishu, the National Consultative Council (NCC) proposed replacing the decades-old clan-based electoral system with universal suffrage by 2024. The proposal also recommended limiting elections to two main political parties, extending presidential terms from four to five years, and abolishing the position of prime minister in favor of a deputy president. The recommendations faced criticism from several political figures, including former prime ministers and former president Sharif Sheikh Ahmed, who viewed the plan as a premature and power-driven initiative, calling for broader consultations. Puntland President Said Abdullahi Deni, who failed to attend the meeting, opposed the electoral change as he considered it to be impossible due to the current situation. According to The Africa Report, most Somalis expressed support for the shift, welcoming the prospect of gaining the right to vote for the first time in 53 years.

On 19 March 2024, more than 70 members from both chambers of the Federal Parliament of Somalia announced their opposition to President Hassan Sheikh Mohamud's constitutional reform plans, following a meeting held the previous evening. They argued that the current process resembled drafting an entirely new constitution rather than amending the existing provisional one.

On 29 March 2024, Human Rights Watch urged the parliament to reject any constitutional amendments that could weaken protections for children's rights, including a proposed amendment that would redefine a child as "to a person under the age of 15 years of maturity while the age of responsibility is 18 years, as defined in the law of the Federal Republic of Somalia," warning that it would contravene the Convention on the Rights of the Child.

On 27 November 2023, a group of parliamentarians announced the formation of the National Correction Caucus, aimed at safeguarding Somalia's constitutional framework. Complaints included the proposed shift to a two-party system instead of a multiparty system and the potential increase in executive powers.

On 30 March 2024, the federal parliament approved a series of constitutional amendments aimed at establishing a more "stable political system". These changes were a return to universal suffrage, the extension of federal terms from four to five years, the introduction of a three-party limit, and granting the president the authority to appoint a prime minister without parliamentary approval. Critics argued that the reforms significantly expanded executive power. In response, Puntland announced the following day that it was withdrawing its recognition and confidence in the Federal Government of Somalia. It called for a "mutually accepted Somali constitution that is subject to a public referendum" and declared that, until such a constitution is in place, it would operate independently.

== Events ==
Amid rising tensions with the FGS, Puntland signed a new cooperation agreement with Ethiopia on 3 April 2024. The following day, the FGS expelled the Ethiopian ambassador in Mogadishu and ordered the closure of two Ethiopian consulates, the one in Puntland and the one in Somaliland, accusing Ethiopia of "repeatedly violating Somalia's national, territorial independence". In response, Puntland declared that "Mogadishu has failed to eradicate terrorist groups and spread governance across the country and now it is trying to impose its decisions on a peaceful region that does not run with its orders. It cannot close a consulate in Puntland."

=== Puntland ===
Puntland Press Release

In October, the National Consultative Council (NCC) convened federal and state officials to discuss democratisation and security. During the meeting, the federal government reaffirmed its commitment to advancing electoral reforms. The NCC proposed a one-year extension of the terms of all state presidents until the universal suffrage system could be implemented, which was accepted by the leaders of Hirshabelle, Galmudug, and South West states. The proposal and constitutional amendments were rejected by Jubaland President Ahmed Mohamed Islam, known as Ahmed Madobe, who believed they would undermine regional autonomy.

=== Jubaland ===
On 10 November, Jubaland suspended cooperation with the federal government, citing constitutional violations. Defying the federal government, Jubaland amended its own constitution to override the two-term limit set by the FGS, extended presidential terms from four to five years, and proceeded with the presidential election on 25 November 2024, in which Madobe won a third term. On 27 November, the Banadir Regional Court in Mogadishu issued an arrest warrant for Madobe, accusing him of treason, violating the constitutional framework, leaking classified information to foreign actors, and undermining national unity.

The following day, the government of Jubaland suspended relations with the federal government. Furthermore, a court in Kismayo, the regional capital of Jubaland, announced a $100,000 reward for the arrest of Somali President Hassan Sheikh Mohamud, accusing him of treason, undermining national unity, and conspiring with Al-Shabaab militia.

==== Clashes ====
Approximate map of the current phase of the Somali Civil War (Updated June 2025) Somalia: Under control of the Federal Government of Somalia, the African Union Support and Stabilization Mission in Somalia, and the United States Under Control of Puntland Under Control of Jubaland Jihadist insurgent groups: Under presence/control of al-Qaeda-backed al-Shabaab and allies Under control of Islamic State-backed Somalia Wilayah Somaliland: Under control of the self-declared state of Somaliland (For a more detailed map of the current military situation, see here.)

On 11 December 2024, Somali forces launched a failed attack on Jubaland regional forces in the Marnani area near Ras Kamboni, havingbeen deployed by the federal government from Mogadishu's Banadir region to Lower Juba region in an attempt to throw out President Ahmed Madobe. At the end of the battle, Jubaland captured hundreds of Somali soldiers and took back Ras Kamboni, Lower Juba.

=== South West State crisis ===
During increased tensions, a rebel group known as the South West Liberation Front claimed to have captured Qansahdhere on 14 March. On 17 March 2026, the South West State severed ties with the federal government over issues related to Somalia's ongoing constitutional changes after allegations by State President Abdiaziz Laftagareen of an attempted coup against him by federal forces. The South West State accused the government of an "invasion" after clashes broke out in several towns between South Western forces and pro-government militias. While government forces captured the de jure state capital of Baraawe, the South West State retained control over the de facto capital Baidoa.

On 28 March 2026, Abdulaziz Laftagreen was re-elected hours after lawmakers chose Ali Said Fiqi as speaker, in a process the Federal Government of Somalia dismissed as an illegal self-appointment that defies constitutional agreements. Tensions stem from South West State's suspension of ties with Mogadishu over disputes on mandate extensions and election methods, with regional states preferring clan-based systems. Laftagareen pledged to focus on development and unity, as opposition leaders offered congratulations and the UN called for dialogue to prevent violence. On 30 March, the Somali National Army took control of Baidoa, with South West President Laftagareen announcing his resignation, and Ahmed Mohamed Hussein being announced as the head of the new transitional government.

=== 2026 term extension ===
The term of the Federal Parliament expired on 14 April, and the federal government has failed to ensure its timely succession. The delay causes a lot of tension because there is no clear plan for the upcoming elections, which come after a string of problems in the legislature.

On 14 May, heavy fighting erupted in Baidoa between Somali federal government forces and troops loyal to former South West State president Abdiaziz Laftagareen, following disputes over regional elections and the end of president Hassan Sheikh Mohamud's term on 15 May. Multiple sources confirm two senior Somali military officers from the 60th Division have been killed in a roadside ambush. later day International representatives, excluding those from the United Kingdom and the United States, meet in Mogadishu and deem the administration of Hassan Sheikh Mohamud as the de facto Somali government. Operational Policy 7.30, a framework typically applied to countries that have lost statehood or where a government assumes power outside the country’s constitutional framework, will be utilized. Opposition coalition Somali Future Council said the disputed president Hassan Sheikh Mohamud can no longer perform key presidential functions, including military oversight or dismissing government officials. They propose that parliamentary speaker Aden Madobe serve as acting president until elections scheduled for 30 June. The president has lost full executive authority following the expiry of his mandate on 15 May.

On 3 June, at least 13 people were killed and 189 others injured, following heavy fighting in Mogadishu near Dabka Junction, which spread to populated neighbourhoods including Howlwadaag, Abdiaziz, Hodan, Warta Nabadda, and parts of Kaaraan. Leaders of the opposition Somali Future Council reported being attacked by forces loyal to disputed president Hassan Sheikh Mohamud ahead of planned anti-government protests.

On 17 August, multiple combatants were killed after Somali federal forces and South West Liberation Front clashed in South West State. Two civilians were also killed. Following militias loyal to former state president Abdiaziz Laftagareen entered the regional capital, Baidoa, challenging two battalions of the Somali National Army loyal to Somali President Hassan Sheikh Mohamud.

On 5 November 2026, Somalia's Supreme Court ruled that disputed President Hassan Sheikh Mohamud’s official term expired on 15 May, invalidating subsequent term extensions and ordering political stakeholders to announce new elections within 90 days. The five-member Constitutional Division of the Supreme Court's landmark decision has set off a serious institutional showdown between the presidential palace and the judiciary system.

== Reactions ==
On 20 November 2024, the international community expressed concern over the escalating tensions between the FGS and the Jubaland administration, urging both sides to engage in inclusive dialogue to resolve ongoing electoral disputes and calling on Jubaland to restore relations with the central government to prevent further escalation.

The breakaway state of Somaliland distanced itself from the controversy as it does not consider itself a part of Somalia.

== List ==
=== Governing ===
Portrait	Name	Term of Office		Political Party
Ruling Party of Somalia
	Hassan Sheikh Mohamud	2023	Incumbent	UPD
	Salah Jama	2023	Incumbent	UPD
	Hamza Abdi Barre	2023	2025	UPD
	Aden Madobe	2023	Incumbent	UPD
	Yusuf Hussein Jimaale	2023–2024	—	UPD
	Ali Abdullahi Hussein	2023	Incumbent	UPD
	Ahmed Abdi Karie	2023	Incumbent	UPD

=== Opposition: Somali Future Council ===
Portrait	Name	Term of Office		Political Party
Chairman of Somali
	Said Abdullahi Deni	2023	Incumbent	Kaah Political Association
	Ahmed Mohamed Islam	2023	Incumbent	Raskamboni Movement
	Sharif Sheikh Ahmed	2023	Incumbent	Himilo Qaran
	Abdiaziz Laftagareen	2026	incumbent	Tayo Political Party
	Mohamed Abdullahi Farmajo	2023	Incumbent	Tayo Political Party
	Hassan Ali Khaire	2023	Incumbent	Tayo Political Party
	Abdirahman Abdishakur Warsame	2023	Incumbent	Wadajir Party
	Abdiweli Gaas	2023	Incumbent	UDAD
	Omar Sharmarke	2023	Incumbent	Independent
	Mohamed Hussein Roble	2023	Incumbent	Independent

== See also ==
- 2021–2022 Somali political crisis
- Las Anod conflict
- Puntland–Somaliland dispute
- Somali Civil War (2009–present)
- Somali Civil War
