= List of massacres in Somalia =

The following is a list of massacres that have occurred in Somalia (numbers may be approximate):

Name	Date	Perpretrator	Location	Deaths including perpetrators	Notes
Isaaq genocide	1987 to 1989	Somali Democratic Republic	Somali Democratic Republic	50,000–200,000	
Mogadishu riots of July 1989	July 14, 1989	Somali Democratic Republic	Mogadishu	400	
Jazeera Beach Massacre	July 15, 1989	Somali Democratic Republic	Jazeera Beach, 20 miles south of Mogadishu	47	
Bloody Monday raid	July 12, 1993	United States	Mogadishu	UNOSOM II claim - 7 to 20 killed (All male combatants) Red Cross claim - 215 casualties, including 54 killed Habar Gidir and SNA claim - 273 casualties, including 73 killed (women and children among deceased) Foreign journalists - 4 killed by mob after the raid	
Al-Hidaya Mosque massacre	April 19, 2008	Ethiopian National Defense Force	Huriwa District, Mogadishu	21	
2009 Beledweyne bombing	June 18, 2009	Al-Shabaab	Beledweyne, Hiiraan	57	
2009 Hotel Shamo bombing	December 3, 2009	Unknown	Mogadishu	25	
May 2010 Mogadishu bombings	May 1, 2010	Unknown	Mogadishu	39	
Muna Hotel attack	August 24. 2010	Al-Shabaab	Mogadishu	32	
2011 Mogadishu bombing	October 4, 2011	Al-Shabaab	Mogadishu	100	
2013 United Nations compound attack in Mogadishu	June 19, 2013	Al-Shabaab	Mogadishu	22	
Baidoa suicide bombing	February 28, 2016	Al-Shabaab	Baidoa	30	
Awdiinle massacre	July 17, 2016	Ethiopian National Defense Force	Awdiinle, 30 km west of Baidoa	13	
2024 Lido Beach attack	August 2, 2024	Al-Shabaab	Lido Beach, Mogadishu	56+	
2024 Mogadishu tea shop bombing	August 17, 2024	Al-Shabaab	Daynile, Mogadishu	21+	
