= 2026 Mogadishu clashes =

Clashes in Mogadishu, Somalia

- Part of Somali Civil War, Constitutional crisis in Somalia and Controversies of Hassan Sheikh Mohamud
- Date: June 3–5, 2026
- Location: Mogadishu

Casualties
- Deaths: 13
- Injuries: 189

On 3 June 2026, fighting erupted in the Howlwadaag district of Mogadishu, ahead of planned protests against the extension of disputed president Hassan Sheikh Mohamud's term. Shooting took place near the homes of former prime minister Hassan Khaire and former president Sharif Sheikh Ahmed, both opposition leaders involved in planning the protests. Khaire stated that government forces attempted to kill him, while police labeled the event as a "large-scale security operation", blaming armed militias for starting the hostilities. Fighting later spread to the districts of Abdiaziz, Hodan, Warta Nabadda, and Kaaraan. The UNHCR estimated that the clashes were responsible for 13 deaths, 189 injuries and 12,500 displaced households.

Fighting renewed in the morning of 4 June. An agreement to end the fighting in Howlwadaag was reached in the afternoon, following talks between Hassan Khaire and the director of the National Intelligence and Security Agency. Clashes continued near Sharif Sheikh Ahmed's residence in the Abdiaziz district, ending the next day through mediation by clan elders.

== Reactions ==
United Nations General Secretary António Guterres condemned the violence, calling all parties to exercise restraint and protect civilians. The United States diplomatic mission in Mogadishu called the violence "reckless", requesting peaceful dialogue between the parties.
