= Bondhere, Mogadishu =

Bondhere Degmada Boondheere
- Neighbourhood
- Motto: Beledkeena Waa Boondheerow-Libaax
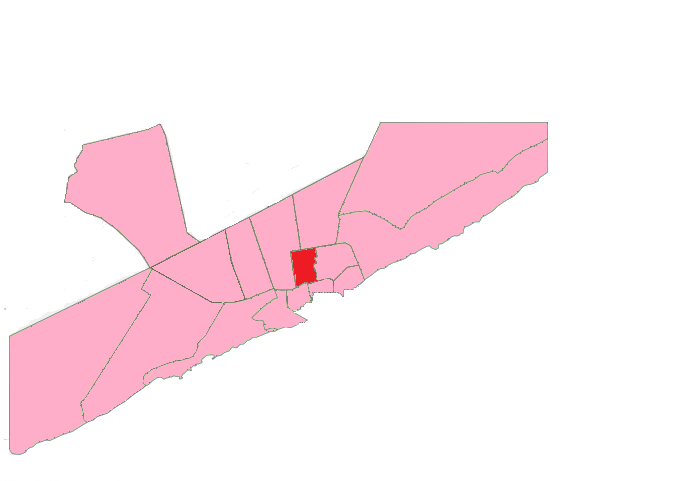
- Coordinates: 2.0333°N 45.3500°E
- Country: Somalia
- Region: Banaadir
- City: Mogadishu

Government
  - Type: Neighbourhood Governor
  - Governor: Vacant
- Time zone: UTC+3 (EAT)
- Area code: +252

Bondhere Neighbourhood (Somali: Boondheere) was a historical settlement and now a neighbourhood of Banadir region in Somalia. This neighbourhood is crossed by the following roads: General Daoud Road that passes through Bondhere from Wardhiigley Neighbourhood, and Upper Jubadan Road that passes through Shibis Neighbourhood. Ummada Road or as it is called "Wadnaha", which passes through Yaqshid Neighbourhood. Lower Juba road that passes through Shingani Neighbourhood. Nasib Bundo Road, which divides Bondhere Neighbourhood and Shabelle Road which borders Bondhere and Hamarweyne Neighbourhoods.

== Suburbs ==
1. Shanta-Geed.
2. Nasiib-Buundo.
3. Al-Ahraam.
4. Wiil-Waal.
5. Busleeyda.
6. Buur-Bishaaro.
7. Ceel Aw-Muude.
8. Ceel-Macalin.
9. Buulo-Maqaarey.
10. Buulo-Ukun.
11. Ceel-Xaaji Haruur.
12. Yusuf Al-Kowneyn.
13. Daljirka Dahsoon.
14. Forno.
15. Nalka Hoose.
16. Nalka Kore.
17. Siinaay.
18. Nabada.
19. Aku doto.
20. Maxmabaare.

== Government facilities ==
- Ministry of Interior and Federal Affairs.
- Ministry of Information, Posts and Telecommunication.
- Ministry of Education, Culture and Higher Education.
- Ministry of Industry and Trade.
- Ministry of Health.

== Schools ==
- Yassin Osman Primary School.
- 12 October Primary School.
- Kacaanka Primary School (ex Boondhere School).
- Wiilwaal Primary School.
- Sh. Hassan Barsame High School.
- Sh. Yusuf Al-Kowneyn High School.
- Saacid High School.
- Al Siraaj Primary and Secondary School.
- Mujamac umulqura.

== Mosques ==
- Mowlaca Sh. Hussain Ade Mosque.
- Buurfuule Mosque.
- Sh. Osman Mocow Mosque.
- Suuqa Af-Leershe Mosque.
- Al-Raxma (Sh. Abukar Macalim) Mosque.
- Xaaji Isse Mosque.
- Xaaji Yabaroow Mosque.
- Mowlaca Sh. Ali Cambar Mosque.
- Cadaawe Mosque.
- Sh. Muhammad Faqi Yusuf Mosque.
- Reer Sh. Ahmed Jimale Mosque.
- Sh. Mohamed Faqi Abore Mosque.
- Mowlaca Sh. Adde Cili Mosque
- Mowlaca Dhagey Mosque.
