= 2026 in Somalia =

- Decades: 2000s; 2010s; 2020s
- See also: History of Somalia; List of years in Somalia

Events in the year 2026 in Somalia.

== Incumbents ==
- President: Hassan Sheikh Mohamud (term ended, disputed: until 15 May), Aden Madobe (Acting president: since 15 May)
- Prime Minister: Hamza Abdi Barre.
- Speaker of the House: Abdi Hashim Abdelahi.

== Events ==
=== Ongoing ===
- Somali Civil War (2009–present)
- Constitutional crisis in Somalia
- Controversies of Hassan Sheikh Mohamud

=== January ===
- 6 January – Israeli foreign minister Gideon Sa'ar visits Somaliland following Israel's decision to recognize the territory as an independent state.
- 7 January – The United States suspends all assistance to the Somali federal government following allegations of theft of food aid by local authorities.
- 12 January – Somalia revokes all bilateral agreements with the United Arab Emirates, citing violations of its sovereignty.

=== February ===
- 9 February – Somalia and Saudi Arabia sign a military cooperation agreement.
- 10 February – A Fokker 50 operated by Starsky Aviation makes a water-landing off the coast of Mogadishu after overshooting the runway at Aden Adde International Airport during an emergency landing shortly after takeoff on its way to Puntland. All 55 on board survive.

=== March ===
- 4 March – The Federal Parliament votes in favor of a proposed new constitution allowing for the direct election of MPs.
- 17 March – The South West State of Somalia announces a suspension of all cooperation and relations with the Federal Government, citing interference in regional leadership and the backing of militias.
- 30 March – The Somali Armed Forces take control of Baidoa, South West State, two weeks after regional president Abdiaziz Laftagareen resigns his administration's ties with the federal government.

=== April ===
- 2 April – The Ministry of Ports and Maritime Transport announces the registration of the ship Guney (IMO 8230417) under the Somali flag, the country's first national-flagged vessel since 1991.
- 14 April – Twenty-seven al-Shabaab militants are killed by security forces in a large-scale defence ministry operation in Jubaland.
- 22 April – An oil tanker sailing from Berbera to Mogadishu is hijacked by pirates off Puntland.
- 27 April – A Saint Kitts and Nevis-flagged cargo vessel is hijacked by pirates off Garacad, Puntland.

=== May ===
- 10 May – One person is shot dead after security forces open fire on demonstrators in Mogadishu protesting against government‑ordered evictions.
- 15 May – A third day of talks mediated by the UK and US between the Somali federal government and the opposition Somali Future Council collapses over their legal future and the electoral process after Hassan Sheikh Mohamud broke his constitutional presidential term limit. His four-year constitutional term formally expired on 15 May, but it ended with no plan for an upcoming election.
- 20 May – Puntland president Said Deni and Vice president Ilyas Osman Lugator host a high-level US delegation in the presidential palace in Garoowe following the expiration of the mandate of Somalia’s federal government, where U.S. representatives sought to strengthen economic opportunities in Puntland’s oil exploration, fisheries, and mineral development sectors.
- 21 May – The Government of Puntland states that federal executive and legislative mandates under the Somali provisional constitution have ended, as federal institutions enter a transitional phase with unclear mandates.

=== June ===
- 10 June – Omar Abdulkadir Artan, who was to have been the first Somali to become a referee at the FIFA World Cup, is denied entry to the United States for the 2026 FIFA World Cup.
- 23 June – The Government of National Stability in eastern Libya bans the entry of nationals from Sudan, Eritrea, Ethiopia, and Somalia, citing a reorganization of foreign nationals' entry procedures.
- 26 June – Somali intelligence officers working with the FBI arrest Abdikerm Eidleh in Mogadishu, alleging him as a senior suspect in the “Feeding Our Future” fraud case in Minnesota.

=== August ===
- 5 August – Puntland forces seize a federal-government-held military camp near Abdullahi Yusuf Airport following more than an hour of fighting, forcing all federal-aligned troops to withdraw to southern Galkayo.
- 22 August – An oil tanker is hijacked by Somali pirates roughly 136 nautical miles east of Mukalla and is taken towards the Puntland coast.

=== October ===
- 29 October – Somali pirates hijack an Iranian fishing boat carrying 20 crew members between Bayla and Hafun. They are later rescued by the Indian navy in the Arabian Sea, over 3,000 kilometers (1,865 miles) from Mumbai.

=== November ===
- 19 November – Somalia expels the UAE ambassador, accusing the UAE of supporting armed forces outside of federal jurisdiction and undermining its unity.

== Holidays ==
- 1 January – New Year's Day
- 16 January – Isra' and Mi'raj
- 20 – 21 March – Eid al-Fitr
- 1 May – Labour Day
- 18 May – Somaliland Declaration of Independence
- 27 – 28 May – Eid al-Adha
- 17 June – Islamic New Year
- 26 June – Ashura
- 1 July – Independence Day
- 26 August – The Prophet's Birthday

== Deaths ==
- 18 November – Mohamud Abdi Gaab, 76, governor of Hiran (2011–2014)

== See also ==
- 2026 in Somaliland
