= Karan, Mogadishu =

Kaaraan
- Neighbourhood
- Nickname: Kaamba Lojo
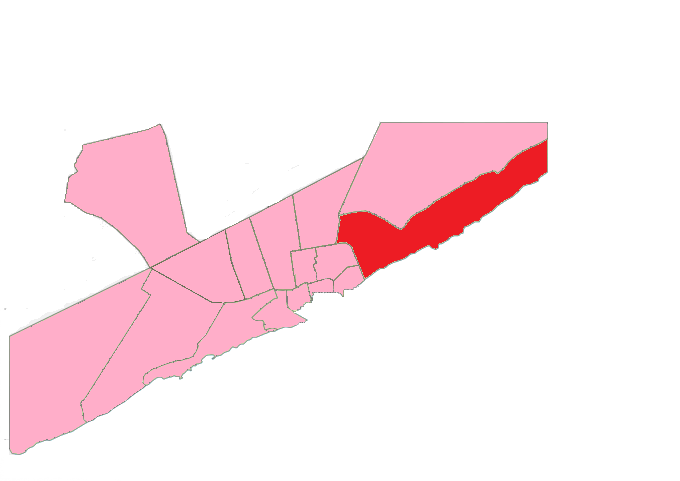
- Coordinates: 2.0333°N 45.3500°E
- Country: Somalia
- Region: Banaadir
- City: Mogadishu
- Time zone: UTC+3 (EAT)

Kaaraan Neighbourhood (Somali: Kaaraan, Muqdisho) is a neighbourhood in the southeastern Banaadir region of Somalia. One of the oldest settlements in Mogadishu, it is bordered by Shibis, Yaqshid, Abdiaziz, Huriwa and the Indian Ocean.

Kaaraan is subdivided into six sub-divisions: Jabuuti, Wajeer, Faanoole, Nageyle, Jamhuuriya and Arjantiin.

The Karan Neighbourhood local authority offices were rehabilitated in 2013, after they had been destroyed in fighting between AMISOM troops and Al-Shabaab, a militant was designated as extreminst terrorist group.
