= Sadia Moalim Ali =

Somali human rights activist (born 1998)

- Sacdiyo Macallin Cali
- Born: c. 1998
- Other name: Sadia Bajaaj
- Occupation: Human rights activist
- Children: 1

Sadia Moalim Ali (Somali: Sacdiyo Macallin Cali; born c. 1998), also known as Sadia Bajaaj (Sacdiyo Bajaaj), is a Somali human rights activist. Known for her campaigning on social media, in 2026 Ali was arrested, charged, and convicted on charges of insulting government officials. The conviction was criticised as being politically motivated by human rights organisations, and was later quashed on appeal.

== Personal life ==
Ali studied nursing, and worked as a tuktuk driver in Mogadishu at the time of her arrest. She has one daughter.

== Activism ==
In 2026, Ali became known for her activism on social media. She often commented on issues facing young Somalis, including youth unemployment, high fuel prices, government corruption and nepotism, and forced evictions. On 12 March, Ali was arrested for the first time after taking part in a protest against an increase in fuel prices. After four days of detention, she was released following a court hearing.

== 2026 arrest and imprisonment ==
On 12 April 2026, Ali was arrested for a second time in the Hodan neighbourhood of Mogadishu by officers from the National Intelligence and Security Agency; the reason for her arrest was not initially disclosed to Ali or her family. After being detained for two days at a police station in Hamar Jajab, on 14 April she was transferred to Mogadishu Central Prison, where she was remanded in pre-trial detention. Local press reported that the Banadir Regional Court had granted an order to NISA officers permitting Ali to be detained for up to 90 days while they continued their investigation. The charges against Ali were reported to be insulting government institutions, and inciting others to commit a crime, based on posts she had made on social media.

In a May 2026 interview with the British newspaper The Guardian, Ali stated she had been tortured at Mogadishu Central Prison, including being forced to lie on the ground, having water poured over here, and being kicked by guards; she also stated she had been kept in solitary confinement for two days, during which time she was prevented from accessing food and a toilet.

Ali's trial began on 1 June 2026 at the Banadir Regional Court. The evidence used against her included social media posts in which she alleged that positions within Banadir Regional Council were being distributed to members of certain clans; as well as others where she arranged public gatherings. Ali's legal team argued that the information in the posts did not constitute a criminal offence. During her testimony, Ali reported that she had been threatened with rape while in prison.

On 25 June 2026, Ali was sentenced to three years imprisonment for insulting government institutions; she was not found guilty of incitement to commit crime. Mohamed Sheikh Osman, one of Ali's lawyers, announced that she rejected the ruling and would appeal the decision.

Ali's appeal began on 2 August 2026 at the Banadir Regional Court of Appeal. On 12 August, her sentence was quashed, with the court finding that there was insufficient evidence to prove that she had defamed officials. Ali was subsequently released from Mogadishu Central Prison that same day.

== Reactions ==
Ali's arrest and imprisonment were criticised by human rights groups within Somalia and internationally. The former president of Somalia, Sharif Sheikh Ahmed, condemned her sentence, as did former prime minister Hassan Ali Khaire, who described it as "deeply troubling and fundamentally unjust". The Coalition of Somali Human Rights Defenders, as well as a coalition of 15 Somali women's groups, had publicly called for her release following her arrest, describing her as being arbitrarily detained. Amnesty International stated she had been targeted and prosecuted in response to "speaking out and participating in peaceful protest".
