= Madiina, Mogadishu =

Madiina
- Interactive map of Madiina
- Country: Somalia
- Region: Banaadir
- District: Dharkenley

Madiina is a suburb located in south Mogadishu, Somalia. It is a part of the Dharkanley district of Banadir region. It has Madina Police Hospital, which serves the police personnel and the community.
