= Ali Sheegow =

Somali politician

Ali Sheegow was was a Somali politician. He served as the first Somali governor of Benadir and the first Somali mayor of Mogadishu from 1958 until 1960. From 1956 until 1958 he served as the governor of the province of Majertenia. From 1960 to 1961 he was the Minister of Foreign Affairs in the first Government of Somalia.
