= Freedom of the press in Somalia =

Freedom of press in Somalia is guaranteed under the provisional constitution established when the Federal Government was established in 2012. More than 50 Somali journalists have been killed since 1992. Due to the danger of being exposed to sanctions from both the government and al-Shabaab, Somali journalists and publishers conduct self-censorship on certain controversial issues concerning security and corruption.

== Somali Republic (1960-1969) ==
During the Somali Republic, freedom of the press was widely recognized as stemming from the traditional right of every individual to be heard, reflecting both Somali customary practices and modern democratic principles, political life was considered open to all male members of society, rather than being confined to a particular profession, clan, or social class. Politics was highly popular and radios were highly prized among nomadic communities, valued for access to news and political information. Political engagement during this period often exceeded levels observed in many developed Western democracies.

== Somali Democratic Republic (1969-1991) ==
After the military coup in 1969, the media was entirely controlled by the state. Media outlets, especially the main broadcast outlets such as Radio Mogadishu and state television were used to communicate government messages and propaganda rather than independent reporting. Independent or opposition press was effectively nonexistent. The regime established regulations and created committees responsible for controlling and censoring scripts, films, literary works, and the free expression of opinion.

The Censorship Board was formed in 1970. The board comprised members from the Ministries of Interior, Justice, Religion, Education, Information and National Guidance, as well as police and security services. The information and national guidance ministry was particularly tasked to keep on eye over what the international press would write about the regime. It charged with screening all literary productions. Even ordinary correspondence between friends and relatives was sometimes subject to review by the Censorship Board.

In January 1971, the Censorship Committee, more draconian than the existing Censorship Board (also known as the Central Censorship Board) was established. Any fiction and non-fiction books had to go through an arduous process of censorship. A new law was passed on 2 January 1971 ensuring strict censorship. Under the Law, theatrical performances and cinema shows should not be circulated without a prior authorisation of the censorship committee, headed by Ismail Ali Obokor, the Minister of Information. Another law passed on 19 August 1974 decreed that the censorship board was to be directed from the Presidential Palace. The Censorship Board made censorship a normalised element within the state. The board was notoriously known for its asinine deliberations over projects under its attention.

A 1988 Human rights report stated :

"The Government owns and operates the radio and television as well as the country's six newspapers. The Central Censorship Board retains control over all media (foreign and local), including publications circulated within the country such as films, plays, concerts, lectures, and videotapes, whether imported or produced in Somalia, One editor was reportedly detained in 1988 after he reprinted an article that was no longer consistent with government policies. The Government frequently denies visas to foreign journalists and strictly controls the movements of journalists who are permitted to enter Somalia."

Throughout the regime's rule, possession of пewspapers and journals unauthorized by the Censorship Board had brought prison sentences of 5 to 15 years.

== Civil war (1990s) ==
The fall of Siad Barre's dictatorship in 1991 ended the state's monopoly on the media in Somalia. A free press was born in the ruins of Mogadishu. Media in Somalia became unregulated and journalists had unrestricted freedom to write and publish stories without editorial oversight, and many took an active role in the conflict's propaganda battle. Private and independent radio stations, newspapers, and other media proliferated in the 1990s. This reflected a sudden shift from the strictly controlled media under Siad Barre to a chaotic but pluralistic environment during the civil war era. However many new media organisations were founded by warlords and used as propaganda platforms for their interests, rather than as independent news sources.

In 1999, three Somali friends from Canada came back to Mogadishu to establish HornAfrik, the first independent radio network to have its headquarters in the city.

== Transitional National Government (2000-2004) ==
The National Union of Somali Journalists was formed in 2002, in response to an attempt by the Transitional National Government to re-establish regulation over the industry through what NUSOJ characterized as a "repressive" media law. The Transitional Charter and regional constitutions technically allowed press freedom. However, in practice the right was sharply restricted due to political instability and the TNG's weak control over territory and security forces. Journalists continued to face harassment, arbitrary arrest, and detention, and many were forced into exile, independent media outlets continued to proliferate during the early 2000s despite these constraints.

== Islamic Courts Union (2004-2006) ==
In September 2006, the Islamic Courts Union shut down Radio Jowhar for two days after it broadcast music and “love songs” which officials said were un-Islamic. The station was allowed to reopen only after agreeing to limitations on music.

== Transitional Federal Government (2004-2012) ==
During the Transitional Federal Government period, violence and insecurity made reporting dangerous. Journalists faced threats, harassment, and murder from multiple actors, including militia groups, insurgent factions, and sometimes government security forces, severely limiting independent journalism. Kate Peyton of the BBC, one of several foreign reporters who entered the country to cover the peace process in early 2005, was killed in Mogadishu shocking the international journalist community. Peyton was shot from a passing car outside a well-guarded Hotel where other foreign journalists were also staying. Local sources said Peyton may have been targeted to discourage foreigners and maintain a climate of insecurity. Several "veteran" Somali journalists were murdered, imprisoned or harassed by the TFG and local militias in 2005.

In 2006, the Committee to Protect Journalists (CPJ) expressed its concern over the rising attacks on journalists as conflict intensified. By 2007, Human Rights Watch had reported that independent media growth was severely damaged, and journalists suffered killings and arbitrary arrests without effective protection or accountability. In 2008, Amnesty International and other human rights organisations documented systematic attacks on journalists, including threats and death threats attributed to both government security agencies and armed groups, which severely impeded independent reporting.

In 2009, at least nine journalists were killed in direct relation to their work making Somalia one of the world's deadliest countries for the press. HornAfrik director Said Tahlil Ahmed and Radio Shabelle director Mukhtar Mohamed Hirabe were among those murdered, and media outlets were repeatedly threatened and forced off the air. A suicide bombing in Mogadishu killed three journalists at a graduation ceremony, highlighting extreme risks to media workers.

In 2010, Somalia remained Africa's most dangerous country for journalism. Two journalists were killed and many others fled the country due to violence, threats, severe censorship, and detention by insurgent groups. Journalists practiced extreme self‑censorship to survive the combination of armed conflict and government limitations.

In 2011, press freedom violations persisted with continued killings and attacks on journalists. Al‑Shabaab and other armed actors intensified threats against media personnel. Journalists continued fleeing the country or facing deadly violence, including AU soldiers implicated in a shooting incident, reflecting the extreme dangers journalists encountered even outside direct combat zones.

== Deadliest Year (2012) ==
In 2012, due to frustration at the increasing number of expatriate journalists returning to the capital after the relative improvement in security, al-Shabaab intensified their anti-media campaign, 4 journalists were killed in 24 hours.

2012 was the deadliest year ever recorded for journalists in Somalia, with at least 12 journalists killed in direct relation to their work. Most deaths occurred in the capital and a few elsewhere such as Galkayo. Journalists fled abroad in record numbers due to insecurity and threats, with Somalia ranking near the top of global exiles for journalists. Reporters Without Borders cited 2012's death toll as the main reason behind its placement of Somalia at 175 in its 2013 Press Freedom Index of 179 countries, an eleven-point drop in ranking from 2011.

== Federal Government of Somalia (2012-present) ==
The Federal Government of Somalia was established in August 2012, representing the first permanent central government in the country since the start of the civil war. A federal parliament was formed and a new provisional constitution was adopted. Government courts were set up for the first time in many years.

=== 2013 ===
In January 2013, senior Radio Dalsan reporter Abdiaziz Abdinur Ibrahim was detained in the capital after interviewing an alleged victim of sexual assault, and tried on charges of insulting state institutions and coaxing false testimony out of the interviewee. The two were convicted by a local court in early February, with both their cases later the same month overturned by an appeals tribunal and the apex court due to lack of evidence. Media outlets were suspended temporarily during political disputes and criticism of security forces could still draw retaliation.

In 2013 there were efforts to improve press mobility and security by Somali government forces who were assisted by AMISOM soldiers. They concurrently conducted several large sweeps in Mogadishu, seizing weapons and arresting 1,700 and 730 suspected Al-Shabaab associates during two separate operations. According to the CPJ, the number of slain journalists had dropped significantly by the end of 2013, with only four reporters killed during the year. For the first time, the federal authorities also established a task force to investigate allegations of journalist harassment, and facilitated talks between domestic and international media representatives for the drafting of a new Somali media law.

=== 2014 ===
In 2014, deadly violence against journalists continued in Somalia, with multiple media workers targeted by non‑state actors and militia groups. In several regions, journalists were shot, attacked, or faced assassination attempts while reporting, reflecting the ongoing threat from armed groups and insecurity. Veteran journalist Yusuf Ahmed Abukar was killed on 21 June 2014 in Mogadishu, freelance journalist Abdirisak Ali Abdi was killed by gunmen in Galkayo on 18 November 2014. Several other journalists survived targeted shooting attacks in the capital and elsewhere throughout the year.

=== 2015 ===
In 2015, journalists in Somalia continued to face targeted violence, including deaths and attacks while reporting in conflict zones. According to Human Rights Watch, freelance journalist Mustaf Abdi Nor was killed on 1 November 2015 while covering the aftermath of an Al‑Shabab attack in Mogadishu. Photographer Feisal Omar Hashi was also injured in the same attack. Throughout the year, 6 journalists were murdered and 25 were arrested, many detained without charge. Some journalists appeared in court and were convicted or fined on spurious charges relating to their professional work. Despite intense danger, harassment, and legal threats, Somali journalists remained steadfast in their work

=== 2016 ===
Somalia remained one of the world's most dangerous countries for journalists in 2016. On 5 June 2016, Somali journalist Sagal Salad Osman was shot dead by unidentified gunmen in Mogadishu. The killing drew condemnation from international organisations as an attack on press freedom. In July 2016, security forces in Jowhar shut down City FM and arrested two journalists. In October 2016, Somalia's National Intelligence and Security Agency (NISA) raided Xog Ogaal newspaper's offices in Mogadishu and arrested its editor, Abdi Aden Guled, effectively silencing one of the country's oldest independent newspapers. Also in October, an Al‑Jazeera journalist and his crew were detained by Somali authorities for about 48 hours, drawing international criticism from press freedom organisations.

Government agencies, especially NISA, used national security justifications to arrest journalists, close outlets, and restrict reporting on sensitive topics, particularly coverage that touched on Al‑Shabaab or political controversy. At the same time, al‑Shabaab continued to threaten and target journalists. Somalia was ranked 167th out of 180 countries on the World Press Freedom Index in 2016, reflecting one of the weakest environments for independent media globally.

=== 2017 ===
Somali broadcast journalist Abdullahi Osman Moalim died on 14 September 2017 from injuries sustained in a suicide bombing at a café in Beledweyne frequented by media personnel. Another two journalists were wounded in the same attack. Abdullahi Osman Farah, a reporter for Maandeeq FM, was killed in the 14 October 2017 truck bombing in Mogadishu, one of the deadliest blasts in Somalia's history that also affected many civilians and press workers.

=== 2018 ===
On 26 July 2018, journalist Abdirisak Qasim Iman was shot dead in Mogadishu while travelling to his radio station. On 18 September 2018, journalist Abdirizak Saed Osman, who worked for Radio Codka Nabada in Galkayo, was killed by unknown assailants. On 22 September 2018, authorities in Galmudug detained journalist Mohamed Abdiwali Tohow after he reported that al-Shabaab was regrouping in parts of the state. He was accused of spreading false news. On 27 October 2018, radio journalist Abdullahi Mire Hashi was shot dead by unidentified gunmen in Elasha Biyaha near Mogadishu.

=== 2019 ===
On 12 July 2019, journalists Hodan Nalayeh (founder of Integration TV) and Mohamed Omar Sahal (SBC TV correspondent) were killed during an al-Shabaab attack on the Asasey Hotel in Kismayo, which killed at least 26 people. Another media worker, cameraman Abdinasir Abdulle Ga’al, also died in a bombing targeting a military base in southwestern Mogadishu.

According to the Somali Journalists Syndicate (SJS), 38 journalists were arrested by government forces in 2019, the highest number recorded in a single year in Somalia. The same report documented 37 cases in which journalists were beaten, shot at, or threatened at gunpoint, often while covering bombings or corruption scandals.

On 2 November 2019, the Secretary General of Federation of Somali Journalists (FESOJ) Mohamed Ibrahim said :

“The high level of violence and threats against journalists in Somalia is deeply worrying. Freedom of expression is a fundamental right of the Somali people and a cornerstone for a democracy. It must be respected by all parties. I call on the Government of Somalia to follow up thoroughly on each case of violence against journalists and ensure that the perpetrators are brought to justice. There cannot be impunity. A safe working environment for all those working in the media must be ensured.”

=== 2020 ===
Between 2010 and 2020, 57 journalists were killed in Somalia with only 4 perpetrators facing justice.

On 16 February 2020, freelance journalist Abdullahi Ali Hassan was shot dead by armed assailants in Afgoye, about 30 km from Mogadishu. Journalist Abdiaziz Ahmed Gurbiye of Goobjoog Media was arrested in April 2020 after publishing an article accusing the president of taking a ventilator donated to a hospital, he was later fined and released. Journalist Mohamed Abduwahab was detained for five months and brought before a military court on treason and terrorism charges after writing criticism of security forces, the charges were later dismissed. On 4 May 2020, journalist Said Yusuf Ali, a reporter for Kalsan TV, was fatally stabbed by an attacker in Mogadishu, on the same day, police beat and injured a television reporter and cameraman covering a demonstration in Mogadishu. By September 2020, approximately 32 journalists had been arbitrarily arrested across Somalia, most of them briefly detained and released without charge. At least five media outlets were raided or temporarily closed during the year.

Amnesty International produced a report in February 2020 titled "We live in perpetual fear" which focuses on deterioration of press freedom in the country since President Mohamed Abdullahi Mohamed took office in February 2017. In April 2020, prominent VOA journalist Harun Maruf was allegedly harassed and threatened by NISA under charges of undermining unity and having connections with al-Shabaab. The US Embassy in Somalia subsequently defended his journalism, citing NISA actions as attacking press freedom.

In April 2020, Laetitia Bader, the Horn of Africa director for Human Rights Watch, appealed to the Somali authorities to stop jailing and harassing journalists, highlighting the fact that it is a particularly crucial time for accurate news dissemination to the public due to the upcoming elections as well as COVID-19. In May 2020 the International Press Institute wrote an open letter to President Mohamed expressing concern at harassment, intimidation and arrest of independent journalists and media outlets.

Somalia remained one of the most dangerous countries in the world for journalists, with widespread impunity for crimes against media workers and threats from both al-Shabaab and the government.

=== 2021 ===
In February 2021, there were arbitrary arrest of journalists following protests in Mogadishu over delays in elections. Journalist were threatened and intimidated at gunpoint, denied access and their equipment was confiscated by government forces.

In March 2021, Amnesty International called on the Somali authorities to bring an end to the arbitrary arrest and persecution of journalists in Puntland, prior to the presidential and parliamentary elections :

"The spike in arrests of journalists in Puntland shows an escalating crackdown on media freedom. These arrests will have a chilling effect on the work of journalists before, during and after the election. Authorities must bring this practice to an end, and respect, protect, promote and fulfil the human rights of everyone and media freedom."

In the same month, Puntland president Said Abdullahi Deni issued a pardon to journalist Kilwe Adan Farah who had been sentenced to three years, having spent 90 days in prison. The National Union of Somali Journalists (NUSOJ) welcomed his release stating :

"Kilwe Adan Farah should never have been detained, let alone convicted of any crime. He continues to be innocent and was merely targeted for doing journalism."

In March of that same year, freelance journalist Jamal Farah Adan was shot dead by gunmen in Galkayo (Puntland) after previously receiving death threats related to his reporting. On 20 November 2021, prominent journalist and director of Radio Mogadishu Abdiaziz Mohamud Guled was killed in an al-Shabaab suicide bombing in the capital. Star Media Network journalist Mohamud Mohamed Sheikh was arrested in July 2021 in Gedo after criticising the federal government.

=== 2022 ===
On 30 September 2022, journalist and cameraman Ahmed Mohamed Shukur of Somali National Television (SNTV) was killed by an improvised explosive device while covering a military operation against al-Shabaab near Mogadishu. According to the Somali Journalists Syndicate, 84 journalists were arrested during the year, 10 were injured, 2 were killed, and 7 media stations were raided or temporarily shut down. Other media monitoring groups recorded around 95 attacks against journalists and media outlets in 2022, including arrests, threats, torture, equipment confiscation, and travel restrictions.

=== 2023 ===
On 16 April 2023, four journalists were arrested in Mogadishu while attempting to report on an explosion in the capital. They were also released after brief detention. On 16 October 2023, journalist Abdifatah Moalim Nur (Qeys), the director of Somali Cable TV, was killed in a suicide bombing in Mogadishu.

Monitoring groups reported numerous violations against journalists during 2023, including arrests, harassment, and threats while covering protests, corruption investigations, and security incidents. Between June 2022 and June 2023, press freedom monitors documented four journalists killed, 63 journalists arrested or detained, eight injured, and 25 tortured.

=== 2024 ===
The NUSOJ documented 52 attacks against journalists in 2024, including arbitrary arrests, physical assaults, harassment, and threats against media workers and outlets. Journalists were targeted by state security forces, regional authorities, and al-Shabaab. Ali Nur Salad, a journalist with Dawan Media, was arrested in July 2024 after reporting on drug use (khat) among Somali security forces.

The SJS reported at least one journalist killed in Somalia in 2024. Amun Abdullahi Mohamed, 49 years old, was murdered by al-Shabaab militants on 18 October 2024, she was shot dead at an unknown location near Afgoye, local police expressed fear and admitted their unwillingness to visit the site of the killing.

=== 2025 ===
On 18 March 2025, journalist Mohamed Abukar Dabaashe, a reporter for Radio Risaala, was killed in a roadside bomb attack in Mogadishu that targeted the convoy of President Hassan Sheikh Mohamud. Dabaashe was the only journalist killed in 2025. Press freedom organisations reported a surge in attacks on journalists in early 2025, with at least 41 journalists arrested, assaulted, or harassed by security personnel in only 2 months.

From January to December 2025, 148 cases of media freedom violations were documented during the year, marking a significant rise compared to the previous years. Out of these, 148 journalists were arrested or arbitrarily detained. Mogadishu recorded the highest number, with 118 cases of violations, mainly carried out by the police followed by the National Intelligence and Security Agency (NISA). In Mogadishu, the police chief Mahdi Omar Mumin (Moalim Mahdi) and district police commanders are repeatedly implicated in orchestrating, ordering, and, in some cases, directly carrying out unlawful arrests, detentions, and the confiscation of journalists equipment. Nearly 90% of those arrested were never brought before a court and were released without charge after spending hours or days in detention. Additionally, over 10% of the violations affected women journalists.

Somalia continues to be considered one of the most dangerous countries for journalists. However, its ranking on the World Press Freedom Index improved from 172nd out of 180 countries in 2015 (higher than China) to 136th out of 180 in 2025.

=== 2026 ===
On 4 February 2026, Voice of America reported that at least 7 Somali media outlets had received phone calls from a person identifying himself as Abdikadir Hussein Wehliye from the presidential office, instructing them to submit content for review before broadcasting. Somali officials denied that anyone by that name worked in the president's communications office or had authority to issue such instructions. Journalists said the calls came amid earlier government guidance on reporting about al‑Shabaab, which some reporters said could restrict press freedom. The Associated Press also reported that police in Hirshabelle state detained four media workers over coverage of al-Shabaab attacks.

On 2 March 2026, broadcast journalist Abshir Khalif Shide Omar was shot dead in Kismayo in the Jubaland region. A police officer was arrested following the shooting after an altercation between the officer and the journalist. Press freedom organisations reported that this was the first killing of a journalist in Somalia in 2026 and called for a credible investigation into the incident.

On 18 March 2026, two women journalists in Mogadishu were violently arrested by armed police officers and had their equipment confiscated. The officers beat them before forcing them into a police vehicle. Both journalists were taken to Dayniile police station, where they were detained before being released later in the afternoon.

== Somaliland ==
Journalists in Somaliland have found themselves targeted in a pattern of increased intimidation and harassment by the authorities.

=== 2015 ===
In 2015, Somaliland closed down a leading independent newspaper and maintained the shutdown of another independent newspaper.

=== 2016 ===
With no functioning media law to lend protection, journalists in Somaliland remain wary of state harassment. Security forces have arrested journalists and closed down media station station in 2016. In April 2016, three journalists in Somaliland faced possible jail sentences over reporting on the privatization of a government-owned company.

=== 2017 ===
In February 2017, Somaliland security forces arrested several journalists over their reporting and political commentary. On 20 February, Mohamed Baashe Hassan of Star TV was detained in Hargeisa after criticizing the UAE's approval to build a military base in Somaliland. Earlier that week, Ahmed Abubakar, director of Universal TV, and Abdimalik Muse Coldoon, a journalist and blogger, were also detained at Hargeisa airport. Abubakar was released the following day, while Coldoon remained in custody. In December 2017, Somaliland authorities arrested journalists Ahmed Saed (Saab TV) and Abdirahman Mohamed Ege (Eryal TV) on allegations of publishing false news about the mayor of Berbera, including reports alleging misuse of public property. Their arrests followed the detention of another journalist, Abdirisak Dayib Alil, earlier that month. In July 2017, Omar Ali Hassan, a journalist for Goobjoog Media, was detained without charge by Somaliland authorities at Hargeisa Egal International Airport while traveling from Mogadishu. The International Federation of Journalists (IFJ) and the National Union of Somali Journalists (NUSOJ) condemned the arrest and called for his immediate release, describing it as part of a broader campaign to intimidate journalists working with media outlets linked to the Somali central government.

=== 2018 ===
In February 2018, Mohamed Aabi Digaale, bureau chief for Universal TV, was arrested by Somaliland authorities and held without charge. He was remanded to the Counter Terrorism Unit for seven days before being relocated to Hargeisa's central police station. The arrest was reportedly linked to a Universal TV report on conflict in the Sanaag region, though authorities cited security reasons. The CPJ and the Somaliland Journalists Association (SOLJA) condemned the detention. In June 2018, Somaliland authorities arrested Mukhtar Abdi Jama, a reporter for SomNews TV in Las Anod for covering armed confrontations between Somaliland and Puntland forces in Tukaraq. He was detained at the local police station, with no access for visitors.

=== 2019 ===
On 30 July 2019, Somaliland police arrested four journalists from Eryal TV while they were conducting interviews about a government employment program in Hargeisa. The journalists were held without charge at a police station. On 30 July 2019, police in Somaliland arrested four journalists from Eryal TV while filming students at Hargeisa University who were complaining about corruption in the National Service job-creation program. Police reportedly forced the journalists to delete their footage and warned them against reporting similar stories. Earlier in June, Somaliland authorities had suspended Eryal TV and Horyal TV on national security grounds, but the bans were lifted on 30 June.

=== 2020 ===
In June 2020, Jabir Said Duale, also known as Bulshawi, a journalist for Horyaal 24 TV, was arrested twice in Erigavo for filming a protest about the exclusion of civil society representatives from peace talks between Somalia and Somaliland. He was held for seven days before being released under a presidential pardon.

=== 2021-2022 ===
On 13 April 2021, Somaliland authorities arrested 14 journalists covering a prison riot in Hargeisa including staff from the BBC and other major Somali media outlets. Two women were released shortly after, while the others remained in detention. Reporters Without Borders (RSF) labeled Somaliland as the most repressive state against Somali journalists in 2021, 12 journalists had been arrested there out of a total of 34 in the region. 2 journalists that reported on the 2021 prison riots were still jailed in 2022.

=== 2023 ===
On 15 May 2023, Bushaaro Ali Mohamed, a journalist reporting on Somaliland politics, was arrested by police. She was reportedly assaulted during the arrest and detained in poor conditions, including solitary confinement and restricted access to family and legal counsel. Authorities accused her of disseminating propaganda and undermining national security, but no formal charges were filed. The Committee to Protect Journalists (CPJ) called for her unconditional release and criticized the Somaliland authorities for suppressing journalists expressing dissenting or critical opinions.

=== 2024 ===
On 6 January 2024, authorities in Somaliland raided the offices of MM Somali TV in Hargeisa during a live debate about a port deal between Ethiopia and Somaliland. The agents arrested the station's chair, Mohamed Abdi Sheikh along with a technician, a reporter, and a waiter mistakenly identified as staff. All except Mohamed Abdi Sheikh were released on 9 January without charge. Sheikh was remanded indefinitely by a military court but has not been formally charged. According to the US department of State 2024 country reports on human rights practices, journalists in Somaliland were intimidated and imprisoned for conducting investigations into corruption or topics deemed sensitive.

=== 2025 ===
In September 2025, Somaliland authorities arrested 10 journalists in three weeks. On 29 May 2025, Somaliland police arrested journalist Warsame Kaafi in Erigavo for a post on his Facebook page that interviewed a woman who alleged she had been physically assaulted by the chairman of the local Appeals Court. Warsame reported that the woman was the second to accuse the Appeals Court chairman of assault, following a similar allegation made by another woman earlier in January. Police arrested Kaafi and detained him for four days before releasing him without charge or explanation. Somaliland had the second-highest number of press freedom violations documented by the International Press Institute (IPI) during the second quarter of 2025. Similar to Ethiopia, the majority of cases recorded during this period were linked to arbitrary arrests and detentions of journalists. On 5 August 2025, independent journalist Ahmed Mohamoud Dool was arrested in Hargeisa, Somaliland. He was detained without formal charges and remanded three times without evidence or a court appearance. Dool was held for 28 days and released on 3 September 2025.

From January to December 2025, 36 journalists were detained, particularly in regions such as Erigabo, Sanaag, and Awdal, where inter-clan tensions were high. At least five cases involved kidnappings.

=== 2026 ===
On 6 March 2026, the Committee to Protect Journalists (CPJ) called for the release of Ahmed-Zaki Ibrahim Mohamud, founder of the online outlet Warrame Media who had been detained without formal charges since 22 February in Madhera Prison, Somaliland. Authorities denied his family and lawyer access and he was remanded multiple times by the regional court. His arrest followed the publication of interviews with critics of Somaliland's president and his ties to the state of Israel.
