= Awdiinle =

Awdiinle Awdiinle
- Town
- Awdiinle
- Location in Somalia
- Coordinates: 03°10′15.7″N 43°24′35.5″E
- Country: Somalia
- Region: Bay Region
- District: Baidoa
- Elevation: 460 m (1,510 ft)
- Time zone: UTC+3 (EAT)

Awdiinle (also: Audinle, Aw Dhiinle, Aw Dīnle) is a town in the Baidoa District, Bay Region, Somalia. It is situated 30km west of Baidoa on the main road from Baidoa to Luuq in the Gedo Region.

In 2016 a massacre occurred in Awdiinle.
