= National Intelligence and Security Agency (Somalia) =

Somalia's national intelligence agency

- Hay'adda Sirdoonka iyo Nabadsugidda Qaranka وكالة المخابرات والأمن الوطنية
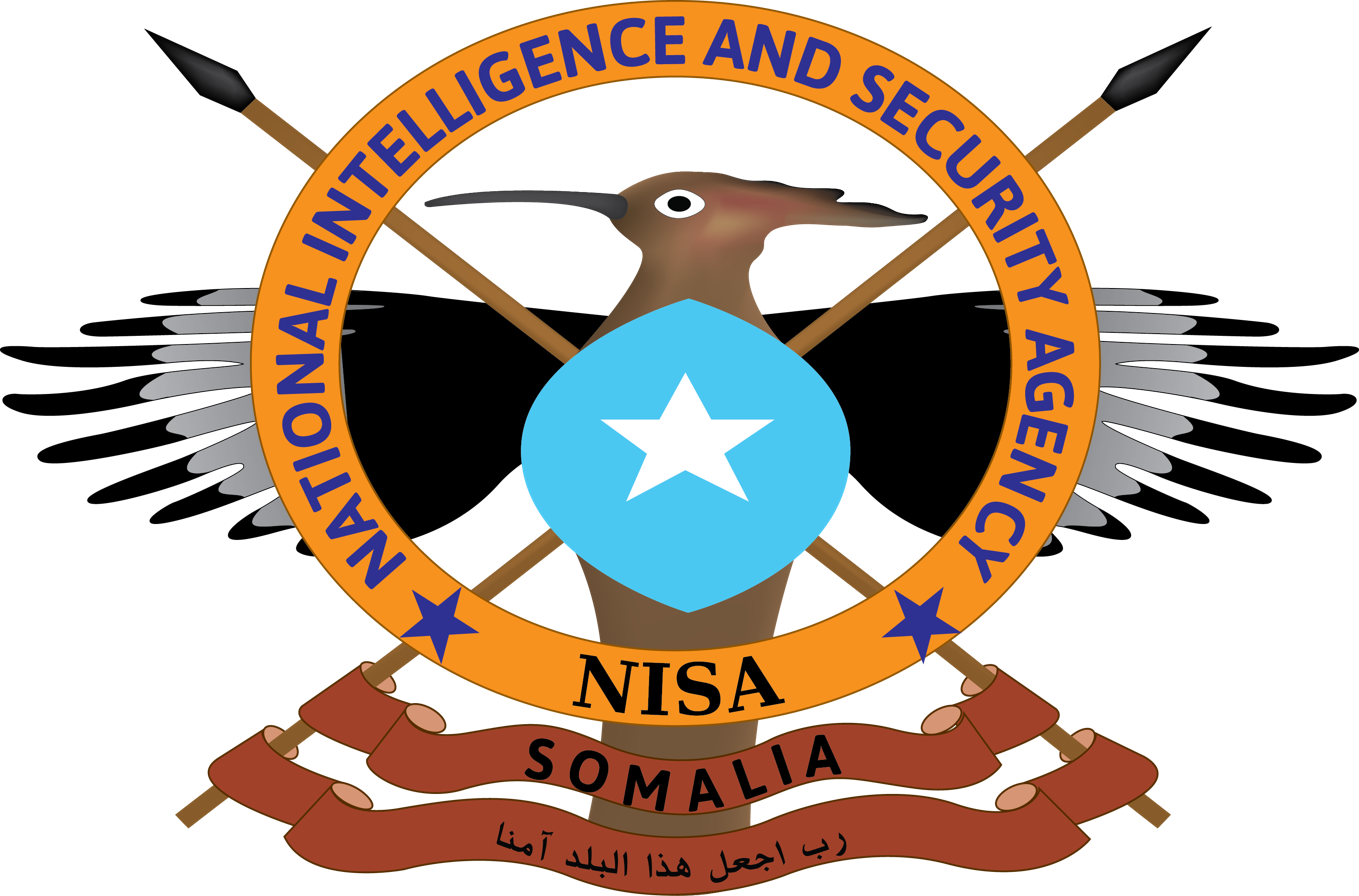
- Seal of the National Intelligence and Security Agency

Intelligence agency and Security agency overview
- Formed: 10 January 2013
- Preceding Intelligence agency and Security agency: National Security Service (1970 - c.1990)
- Jurisdiction: Somalia
- Headquarters: Mogadishu, Somalia
- Employees: Classified
- Annual budget: Classified
- Minister responsible: Abdulahi Sheik Ismael Fara-Tag
- Intelligence agency and Security agency executive: Mahad Mohamed Salad, Director
- Parent department: Ministry of Internal Security (Somalia)

The National Intelligence and Security Agency (NISA) (Somali: Hay'adda Sirdoonka iyo Nabadsugidda Qaranka, Arabic: وكالة المخابرات والأمن الوطنية, romanized: Wakālat al-Mukhābarāt wa-al-Amn al-Waṭanīyah, HSNQ) is the national intelligence agency and security agency of the Somalia. It is headquartered in Mogadishu. The NISA is also closely intertwined with the Somali Armed Forces and regularly cooperates with them.

The agency is assisted by the African Union Mission in Somalia. According to the former Minister of State for the Presidency Abdulkadir Moallin Noor, the U.S.Central Intelligence Agency (CIA) also provided training to NISA officials during the latter agency's formative stages.

NISA personnel have conducted counterintelligence, counterterrorism, and internal security operations against Al-Shabaab elements in the capital.

== History ==
The agency was established in January 2013 by the new Federal Government of Somalia (FGS) in place of the defunct National Security Service.

== Organization ==
=== Counterterrorism and paramilitary forces ===
In April 2014, the United Arab Emirates donated several battle wagons and other equipment to NISA. By July 2014, the Gaashaan ("Shield") unit was being reported as part of the National Intelligence and Security Agency. It is a commando forces trained by the United States. NISA associates indicate that Gaashaan consists of two units totaling 120 men.

Alpha Group is Gaashan's first component, and includes around 40 soldiers and 3 officers who were chosen from amongst 190 special Somali National Army troops. According to Somali defense officials, this unit received training in the United States Army Special Forces (Green Berets) between late 2009 and early 2010. Derek Gannon said that the Alpha Group's training regimen includes anti-irregular forces, commando style raids, counterinsurgency, counterterrorism and hostage rescue crisis management, operating in difficult to access terrain, providing security in areas at risk of attack or terrorism, reconnaissance, and VIPs protections, with an emphasis on quick reaction in an urban environment. The soldiers are also equipped with guns with night vision scopes.

Gaashaan's second counterterrorism and hostage rescue unit is the Bravo Group. It received training at the Aden Adde International Airport (Mogadishu Airport) in 2011.

Abdullah Mohamed Ali "Sanbaloolshe" an elected MP of the national lower house of parliament, the House of the People, was on April 6, 2017, reappointed to the position of NISA Director General.

In May 2018 it was reported that the NISA has grown to 700 personnel, with the Waran having 300 personnel and Gaashaan roughly 400.

=== Equipment ===
	Origin	Notes
Toyota Hilux	Japan	All NISA personnel Hiluxes are black with "NISA" written on the hood in white stencil, also the standard infantry transport vehicle
Casspir	South Africa	NISA Casspirs have black "NISA" lettering.

	Origin	Type	Notes
Makarov pistol	Soviet Union	Pistol	
AK-47	Soviet Union	Assault Rifle	Standard issue rifle of the Somali Armed Forces along with other AK-47 Variants. ACOG scopes and Picatinny rails, laser sights.
AKM	Soviet Union	Assault Rifle	
Rocket Propelled Grenade	Ethiopia	shoulder-fired missile	Locally manufactured and used by the Ethiopian National Defense Forces and widely exported to neighboring countries to Djibouti, Eritrea, South Sudan, Sudan and Yemen (to both warring groups).
AK74	Soviet Union	Assault Rifle	Used by NISA special forces units Gaashaan and Waran. and DANAB commandos. AKS-74 variant. ACOG scopes and picanilly rails, laser sights.
vz. 58	Czech Republic	Assault Rifle	
M4 carbine	United States	Assault Rifle	
Type 56 assault rifle	China	Assault Rifle	Secondary Service Rifle in the SNA, ACOG scopes and picatinny rails, laser sights and foregrips.
Dragunov sniper rifle	Soviet Union	Marksman Rifle	PSO-1 scope.
MPT-76	Turkey	Assault Rifle	450 Delivered

== Criticisms ==
In January 2020, Dr Mohamed Haji Ingiriis, Research Fellow at the African Leadership Centre, King's College London, wrote in African Affairs that NISA 'normalize[s] extrajudicial activities to serve the agenda of political authorities and to suppress their critics.' In an article published by African Security Review in July 2020, he blamed 'an externally-imposed security architecture' for NISA's failure to counter Al Shabaab. According to Ali, since Yasin was appointed to head NISA operations have focussed on silencing political opposition and criticism rather than overcoming Al Shabaab.

=== Harassment of women in Gedo ===
There have been allegations by women from the Gedo region, of arbitrary detention, torture and rape, against NISA officers from the regional office in Gedo, Jubaland, which was commanded by Abdullahi Aadam (Kulane Jiis) at the time.

=== Sacking of top officials ===
In July 2021 Prime Minister Mohammed Hussein Roble dismissed head of NISA at Mogadishu's Aden Abdulle Airport Abdiwahab Sheikh Ali and NISA Chief of staff, Abdullahi Kulane after they refused to allow a group of passengers to fly from Mogadishu airport. { This move was widely agreed to be unconstitutional. Stated in the " Powers of the President" section of the constitution.}

=== Abduction of Ikran Tahlil Farah ===
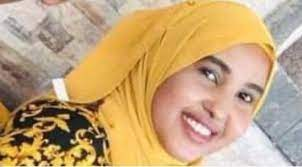
Ikran Tahlil Farah

On 26 June 2021, NISA employee Ikran Tahlil Farah was abducted close to her home in Abdulaziz district of Mogadishu. NISA published a statement on 2 September 2021 claiming that Ikran had been handed to Al Shabaab, who it claimed had then killed her, but Al Shabaab denied any involvement. Prime Minister Roble asked Director General of NISA, Fahad Yasin to submit a report on Ikran's death. Roble suspended Yasin due to his failure to submit the report, replacing him with Lt.Gen. Bashir Mohamed Jama, but the decision was overturned by President Mohamed on the grounds of it being unconstitutional. Roble accused Mohamed of "obstructing effective investigation of Ikran's case". Somalia's international partners called for a 'credible investigation of Ikran's disappearance'. Ikran's mother, Qali Mohamud Gahaad filed charges at the military court, against Fahad Yasin, Abdullahi Kulane, Abdikani Wadna-Qabad and Yasin Faray in relation to the disappearance of her daughter.

On 8 September 2021, Villa Somalia announced that Fahad Yasin had resigned as head of NISA, however subsequently Mohamed appointed him as his National Security Advisor appointing Yasin Abdullahi as head of NISA. However, Roble had re-appointed Bashir Mohamed Jama to the position.

In 2022, NISA officials had repeatedly threatened journalists investigating on the Ikran Tahlil case.

=== Media censorship ===
In July 2023, NISA was accused of bribing or coercing local media to suppress coverage of an Al-Shabaab suicide attack on Jaalle Siyaad Military Academy. Reports emerged that NISA leaders allocated funds to media houses to ensure a blackout of the incident.

In December 2023, Somalia's National Communication Authority (NCA) in collaboration with NISA were accused of suppressing critical voices among journalists and independent content creators on Facebook with the use of denial-of-service attacks. Journalists and media stations critical of the Hassan Sheikh Mohamud administration have faced widespread censorship through Facebook, experiencing warnings of page restrictions, suspension or content removal, often branded as "dangerous organizations and individuals" or "content that goes against community standards."

Mustafa Yasin, the director of the NCA, openly acknowledged his involvement in what he referred to as ‘cybersecurity measures' in 2023. The Secretary-General of the Somali Journalists Syndicate (SJS), Abdalle Mumin, a vocal critic of NISA's human rights violations, also faced content removal and reporting, suggesting collaboration between NCA and NISA.

Journalists have also reported that mass reporting has led to the removal of news reports that alleged police commanders and NISA officers of wrongdoings including sexual violence against women and other abuses.

In April 2020 NISA was accused of intimidation and harassment of Harun Maruf, a journalist who works with Voice of America, through Twitter.

On 18 October 2020, heavily armed NISA officers raided journalist Addow's house in Mogadishu around 11:30pm local time on Saturday leaving the family terrified and subsequently detained him and held at undisclosed location. The raid follows three days after the journalist's interview with a businessman who allegedly criticised the Somali authorities.

On 23 February 2021, news reporter Abdirahman Mohamed Abdi and cameraman Abdirisak Abdullah Fagas were stopped by NISA officers at Daljirka Dahson in Mogadishu where they were filming shortly after the Presidential Opposition Candidates announced to hold a protest scheduled for 26 February. The NISA officers confiscated the camera and deleted their footage. However, the two journalists were not arrested and were allowed to go after the footage was deleted.

On 16 May 2021, NISA officers attacked a group of journalists who were covering the protest by parents of "allegedly missing" young men recruited by the Somali government and sent to Eritrea. Mogadishu based female journalist Fardowso Mohamoud Sahal was beaten and thrown to the ground by Major Sharma'arke and his officers before confiscating her voice recorder and her phone. A live-streamed video on her Facebook showed officers approaching before her phone was snatched amidst live interviews with protesters.

On 11 June 2021, NISA officers accompanied by police officers entered Star FM radio studio in Guriel town, Galmudug State and detained its journalist, Ubeyd Hassan Mohamud, following his report on the unsuccessful efforts to end inter-clan conflict in the region. According to Ubeyd, he was held at a private house owned by the commander of NISA in Guriel for four days.

On 3 July 2021, NISA had illegally arrested a Kenyan journalist in Gedo on the orders of Beledhawo District Commissioner.

On 24 December 2022, NISA agents led by Mahad Carab Dhiblawe stopped and later detained human rights and information secretary, Mohamed Ibrahim Bulbul, SJS training secretary Hanad Ali Guled and SJS lawyer Abdirahman Hassan Omar while they were preparing to board a flight early morning to attend journalists training in Hiiraan region. They were held and interrogated at NISA office within the airport for two hours when they were all released but have missed their flight.

On 5 June 2023, armed NISA agents in Mogadishu detained freelance journalist Abdirahman Ahmed Aden, who contributes for The New Humanitarian. The journalist stated that young NISA officers stopped him on the road on his way to home. They blindfolded him, assaulted him with their pistol during the interrogation, and revealed their intentions to target journalists affiliated with international media, including him, and at one point threatening to kill him. He was held at the Wadajir police station for eight hours that day as confirmed by Abdirahman and a family member who visited him at the police station. Following the terrifying ordeal, the journalist was released without charges, but not before being cautioned that his journalistic activities would be closely monitored.

On January 20, 2024, in the midst of a human rights-focused training session for women journalists, three NISA officers, led by Mohamed Fooxle and Hassan Dahir from the surveillance unit, unexpectedly arrived at Hotel Sahafi in Mogadishu where the training was held. Engaging in disruptive behavior, they harassed hotel staff, trainers, and participants, insisting on obtaining the list of participants, training content, and other related documents. Despite efforts by SJS and hotel management to explain the nature of the training, while emphasizing the need to protect the privacy of participants. The NISA officers ordered an abrupt halt to the day's session, concluding it an hour earlier than scheduled.

On 31 October 2024, Himilo Somali TV editor Nur Abdirahman Nur reported on the closure of business premises in the Somali capital, Mogadishu, documenting a wave of assassinations targeting members of the local business community. These attacks, attributed to al-Shabaab, are allegedly in response to business owners complying with a government order to install CCTV cameras on their premises. Following the report, NISA agents raided Himilo Somali TV's Mogadishu office in search of the journalist, who was not present at the time, according to the station's founder and staff. NISA officials had phoned them that day, demanding the report's deletion under threat of severe consequences. Under these threats, Himilo Somali TV editors complied by removing the news report.

On 25 January 2025, freelance journalist Sharif Abdi was kidnapped from Mogadishu's city center at night by armed NISA officers who tracked his phone, just hours after his home in Waberi district was raided. For 10 days, Sharif was confined in a narrow, dark, and hot cell with 20 other inmates, including Al-Shabaab suspects. His repeated interrogations focused on his critical reporting on Facebook, particularly posts criticizing NISA chief Abdullahi Mohamed Ali. He was released on 9 February 2025, NISA officers told him his detention was meant to "discipline him."

On 5 May 2025, NISA agents raided a residential home and media studio in Mogadishu's Shibis district belonging to journalists Bashir Ali Shire and Mohamed Omar Baakaay. The journalists had previously spoken out about the abduction of "vulnerable women and youth" and their forced registration as voters.

On 6 May 2025, NISA raided a residential house and media studio belonging to journalists Bashir Ali Shire and Mohamed Omar Baakaay in the Shibis district of Mogadishu because of a report by the journalists claiming that "vulnerable women were being exploited for media publicity" during voter registration campaigns in Mogadishu, and that Mogadishu district commissioners "were under pressure to forcibly register people for disputed electoral purposes" in Mogadishu. Two days prior, Commissioner Adani urged government supporters to "take machetes and sticks," declaring they were authorized to "break the journalists bones and enter their house." He went further to label the journalists as "drug addicst and worse than the terrorists" and challenged his supporters to bring them in handcuffs.

On 24 May 2025, NISA agents briefly detained four journalists in Mogadishu: Abdinasir Abduqadir Salah and Abdinasir Sayid Ali from Shabelle TV, and Abdirahman Abdulle Rooble and Hassan Ahmed Takow from SYL TV. The journalists were collecting vox-pop interviews from the public on Maka Al-Mukarama Street, asking for opinions on the coalition of opposition politicians who had held an event in Mogadishu the previous day.

On 5 July 2025, a Mogadishu-based woman journalist named Shukri Caabi Abdi was forcefully detained by NISA and her Journalist ID as well as her mobile phone were confiscated. Shukri was also brutally assaulted by NISA in December 2024 when she was reporting a public protest. Shukri stated that she was dragged, her headscarf stripped off, kicked, and beaten with verbal threats in the middle of the street before a group of local women intervened to rescue her.

On 15 August 2025, armed NISA and police officers were deployed on the roads leading to the Jazeera Hotel in Mogadishu, blocking a dozen of local journalists who were on their way to cover an opposition meeting at the hotel. Some journalists stated that the NISA officers were aggressive and threatened them with physical harm if they attempted to proceed to the meeting. As a result, some journalists returned without covering the event, while others later managed to sneak in.

On 19 August 2025, NISA officers stopped a tuktuk taxi in which journalist Omar Guux was travelling at a security checkpoint in the Walaalaha area of Dharkeenley district and demanded his identification. After he presented his journalist ID, the officers detained him and subjected him to verbal threats and harassment, allegedly because of his covering of forced evictions by the President. Himilo Somali TV has previously been subjected to repeated threats from NISA because of its critical reporting on security issues, forced evictions, and abductions.

On 28 August 2025, armed plainclothes NISA) officers unlawfully detained Feysal Abdi Farah, a reporter for Kalsan TV, and Hassan Mohamed Hashi, a cameraman, while they were covering the rising fish prices at Mogadishu's fish market in Hamarweyne district. The journalists were held in an open area of the market for nearly two hours, during which their equipment was confiscated and their recorded content deleted, before they were eventually released.

=== Mohamed Omar Nastaro incident ===
On 12 September 2025, NISA officers assaulted Somali MP and State Minister for Family Affairs and Human Rights, Mohamed Omar Nastaro at Aden Adde International Airport. Witnesses said the incident began when officers tried to forcefully take a small bag from the lawmaker. Nastaro resisted and was beaten, leaving him with injuries.

== See also ==
- Danab Brigade, commando formation of the Somali National Army
