= Dolow District =

Dolow
- District
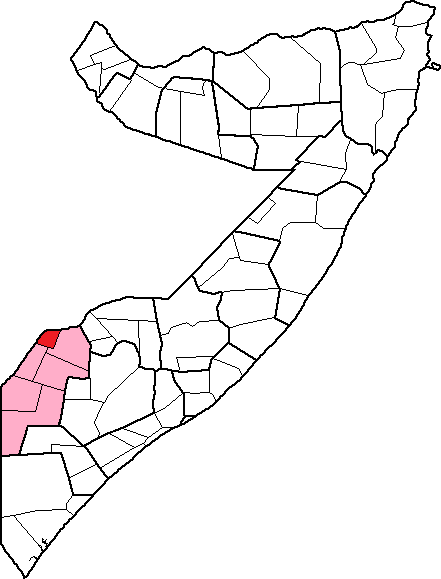
- Dolow District
- Country: Somalia
- Region: Gedo
- Capital: Dolow

Population (2009)
  - Total: 101,782
- Time zone: UTC+3 (EAT)

Dolow District (Somali: Degmada Doolow) is a district in the southwestern Gedo region of Somalia. Its capital is Dolow. Dolow Somalia is bordered west by Dolow Ado district of Ethiopia. Between the two district river dawa halves.

Administration System

The administrative system in dolow town is basically under the Gedo region authority and Somali Nation Armay control as most of the central government offices are yet to be fully opened in Gedo region but obey direct order from the Government money,
