= List of regions of Somalia by Human Development Index =

This is a list of regions of Somalia by the Human Development Index, as of 2023. The data is based on the Subnational Human Development Index version 10.2 of Global Data Lab.

Rank	Region	HDI (2023)
Low Human Development
1	Nugal	0.442
1	Sahil	0.442
2	Awdal	0.430
3	Banadir (Mogadishu)	0.428
4	Woqooyi Galbeed	0.425
5	Hiran	0.424
6	Bari	0.422
7	Mudug	0.418
8	Sanaag	0.417
9	Galguduud	0.409
–	Somalia	0.404
10	Sool	0.399
11	Lower Juba	0.396
12	Gedo	0.387
13	Bay	0.381
14	Middle Shabelle	0.380
15	Bakool	0.371
16	Togdheer	0.365
17	Lower Shabelle	0.288
18	Middle Juba	0.193

== See also ==
- List of countries by Human Development Index
