= Waberi, Mogadishu =

Waberi
- Neighbourhood
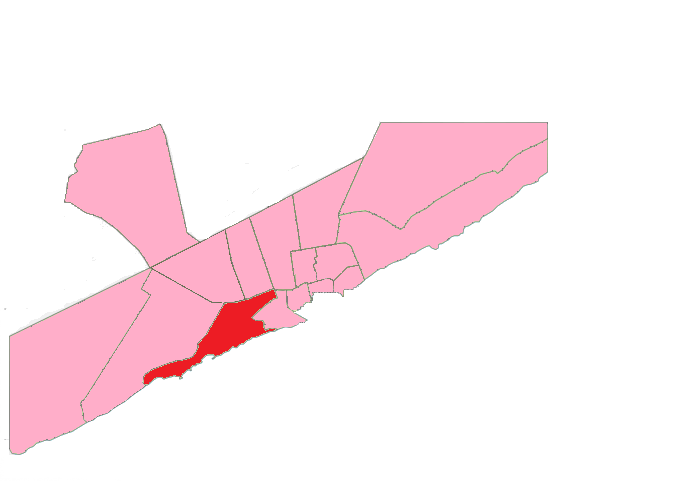
- Country: Somalia
- Region: Banadir
- City: Mogadishu

Government
  - Neighbourhood commissioner: Deeq Aw Xirsi Xuseen
- Time zone: UTC+3 (EAT)

Waberi Neighbourhood (Somali: Waaberi, Buula Eeelay) is a neighbourhood in the southeastern Banaadir region of Somalia. A neighborhood in southwestern Mogadishu, it flanks the Somali Sea.

The Aden Adde International Airport is located in this neighbourhood.
