= Kurtunwarey District =

Kurtuwaarey
- District
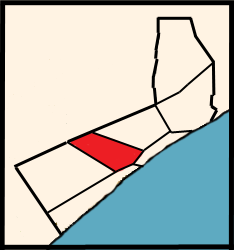
- Country: Somalia (de iure); Islamic Wilayaat of Somalia (de facto)
- Region: Lower Shabelle
- Time zone: UTC+3 (EAT)

Kurtunwarey District (Somali: Degmada Kurtunwarey) is a district of the southeastern Lower Shabelle (Shabeellaha Hoose) region in Somalia. It is primarily inhabited by the Rahanweyn Tribe.
