= Al-Hidaya Mosque massacre =

2008 massacre in Somalia by Ethiopian armed forces

al-Hidaya Mosque massacre
- Part of the Battle of Mogadishu (2008) and Ethiopian occupation of Somalia
- Location: 2.0333°N 45.3500°E; Huriwa District, Mogadishu
- Date: 19 April 2008
- Deaths: 21 killed
- Victims: Islamic scholars and students
- Perpetrator: Ethiopian National Defense Force

The al-Hidaya Mosque massacre occurred on Saturday 19 April 2008 during the Ethiopian occupation of Somalia, when Ethiopian National Defence Force (ENDF) soldiers killed 21 worshippers, including an Imam and several Islamic scholars, at a mosque in Mogadishu, Somalia. During the attack, 41 school children at the mosque were abducted and detained for several days at ENDF bases. The massacre inflamed the rising Islamic insurgency.

== Background ==
Al-Hidaya is one of the biggest mosques in the Somali capital and is situated in the Huriwa District. In the years before the Ethiopian invasion it became a place of worship for adherents to the Hanafi school, in particular the Tablighi Jamaat. The Tablighis were not involved in the largely Islamic insurgency that coalesced in early 2007, and at the time mosque also operated as a religious madrasa for children.

During the April 2008 Battle of Mogadishu, the most fierce clashes since the start of the year was raging between the Somali fighters and ENDF troops. Huriwa and neighboring districts were a focal point of the battles. As fierce fighting was underway in Huriwa during the 19th and 20 April, al-Hidaya came under deliberate artillery fire from Ethiopian forces.

== Massacre ==
According to numerous witnesses, on Sunday April 20, Ethiopian troops stormed into the al-Hidaya mosque where there were more than 100 people present including many school children. Sheikh Hussein Ali, one of the clerics present, told BBC Somali that the Ethiopian army had fired at al-Hidaya with a barrage of mortars and then advanced on the mosque with tanks. The masjid's Imam and most senior leader, Shaykh Sa'id Yahya, opened the mosques door in response to the soldiers knocking, and was killed by the Ethiopians.

The Ethiopians surrounded al-Hidaya Mosque on Sunday and killed [the] mullahs mercilessly, including Sheikh Sa'id, the chief of the group in southern Somalia

— Tablighi official Shiekh Abdi-kheyr Isse, 21 April 2008

Some worshippers were killed by shooting, while others had their throats cut. A total of seven people were reported to have had their throats slit by the Ethiopians. The soldiers left several bodies with their arms bound and throats cut lying outside the mosque. Some of the clerics had been beheaded. Residents who buried the victims reported that several of those killed had their hands cut off and backs broken. A total of 21 people were killed during the massacre, with 11 being murdered inside the mosque and others just outside. Some of those not killed by Ethiopian troops were detained and released the next day, under orders not to return to the mosque. Ethiopian soldiers claimed that 'training' was undergoing at the building.

=== Abduction of school children ===
41 children, ranging from ages 9 to 14 years old, were in classes at the mosque during the killing and were detained by ENDF forces for days after at a military base in north Mogadishu. The Ethiopian troops said they would only release the children, 'if they were not terrorists' and said they suspected the children of being trained for the insurgency at al-Hidaya. On 25 April 2008, the children were released.

== Aftermath and response ==
Several days after the massacre Amnesty International issued a statement condemning the ENDF for the massacre at al-Hidaya. The Ethiopian government denied being involved and accused Amnesty International of "publicizing deliberately invented stories about the activities of Ethiopian troops.” The Ethiopian backed Transitional Federal Government (TFG) initially denied the incident took place, with the Minister of Foreign Affairs Ali Jangali calling reports of a massacre a "baseless lie". President of the TFG, Abdullahi Yusuf, accused Islamic insurgents of dressing up in Ethiopian uniforms and committing the massacre.

Insurgent factions such as Al-Shabaab, the Alliance for the Re-Liberation of Somalia (ARS) and the Islamic Courts Union (ICU) publicly condemned the massacre. Spokesman for the ICU, Sheikh Mohamud Ibrahim Suley, issued a statement condemning both the Ethiopian army and the TFG for defending ENDF actions. Al-Shabaab declared it would avenge those killed. The ARS announced that it had suspended peace talks with the TFG. Several days earlier, head of the ARS Sharif Sheikh Ahmed, publicly announced:

"The Ethiopian forces backing the transitional government mercilessly killed many innocent people, including the people slaughtered at the al-Hidaya mosque...I am clearly stating that we will rethink about attending the expected talks in Djibouti."

Human rights organizations warned that the murders by Ethiopian soldiers would 'dramatically strengthen' the groups fighting against the Ethiopian army. Mogadishu residents reported the massacre had convinced many people to join the anti-Ethiopian insurgency.

== See also ==
- Awdiinle massacre
- Bloody Monday raid
- June 1993 UN killings of Somali protestors

== Bibliography ==
- Barise, Hassan (21 April 2008). "Xaaladda magaalada Muqdisho" [The situation in Mogadishu]. BBC Somali.
- Ryu, Alisha (2008-04-22). "Mogadishu residents express outrage after Ethiopian troops attack mosque". reliefweb.int. Voice of America.
- Adow, Mohamed Amiin (21 April 2008). "Somalia clashes 'the worst since 1991'". CNN.
