= Wadajir, Mogadishu =

Wadajir
- neighbourhood
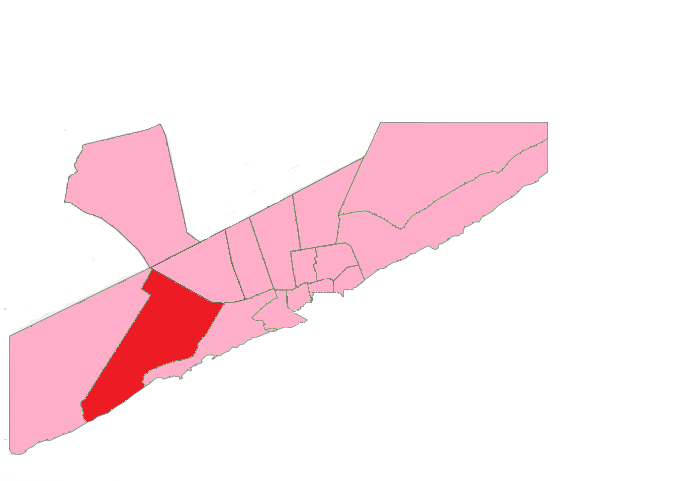
- Coordinates: 2°01′N 45°17′E
- Country: Somalia
- Region: Banaadir
- City: Mogadishu

Government
  - Neighbourhood Commissioner: Ahmed Abdulle Afrah
- Time zone: UTC+3 (EAT)

Wadajir Neighbourhood (Somali: Wadajir, Muqdisho), also called Medina or Madina Neighbourhood is a neighbourhood in the south-central Banaadir region of Somalia. A few southwestern neighborhoods of Mogadishu are located in this neighbourhood, as well as the Somali National University. Also the former US Embassy, now a refugee camp called Siliga Amerikanka (translated American fence/enclosure), and the former Jaalle Siyaad military academy, former used by the AMISOM sector of Brundian Military Contingent is situated in the neighbourhood.

Ahmed Abdulle Afrah succeeded Ahmed Hassan Daaci as neighbourhood commissioner on 25 April 2014; Daaci had served for eight years. Wadajir means together in Somali language.
