= Starsky Aviation =

Somali regional airline

| IATA | ICAO | Call sign |
|---|---|---|
| — | — | Starsky Aviation |
- Founded: 2013
- Hubs: Mogadishu International Airport
- Headquarters: Mogadishu, Somalia

Starsky Aviation is a Somali regional airline and aviation company (sometimes called Starsky Airlines), based mainly in Mogadishu, Somalia. It operates passenger flights, charter services, cargo transport and related aviation services within Somalia and East Africa, using turboprop aircraft like the Fokker 50.

== Incidents ==
On 10 February 2026, a 36 year old Fokker 50 (registration: 60-YAS) aircraft operated by Starsky Aviation was involved in an unusual incident near Mogadishu’s Aden Adde International Airport: after a reported technical issue shortly after takeoff, the plane returned but overran the runway and came to rest near the shoreline, with all passengers and crew surviving uninjured.
