= Baidoa suicide bombing =

Suicide bombing in Somalia on 28 February 2016

- Part of Somali Civil War (2009–present)
- Location: Baidoa, Somalia
- Date: 28 February 2016
- Attack type: Suicide bombing
- Deaths: 30
- Injuries: 40
- Perpetrator: Al-Shabaab

Two suicide bombers attacked a busy junction and a restaurant in the Somali town Baidoa. 30 people, mostly civilians, were killed and another 40 were injured. Al-Shabaab claimed responsibility, saying they targeted government officials and security forces.
