= Dharkenley, Mogadishu =

Dharkenley
- Neighbourhood
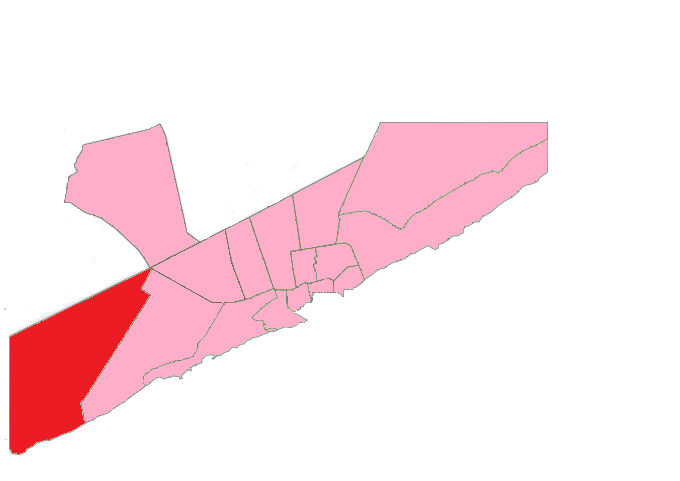
- Country: Somalia
- Region: Banaadir
- City: Mogadishu
- Time zone: UTC+3 (EAT)

Dharkenley Neighbourhood (Somali: Dharkenley) is a neighbourhood in the southeastern Banaadir region of Somalia. It includes the westernmost neighborhoods of the national capital, Mogadishu.

== See also ==
- Madiina
