= Hamar Jajab, Mogadishu =

Hamar Jajab
- Neighbourhood
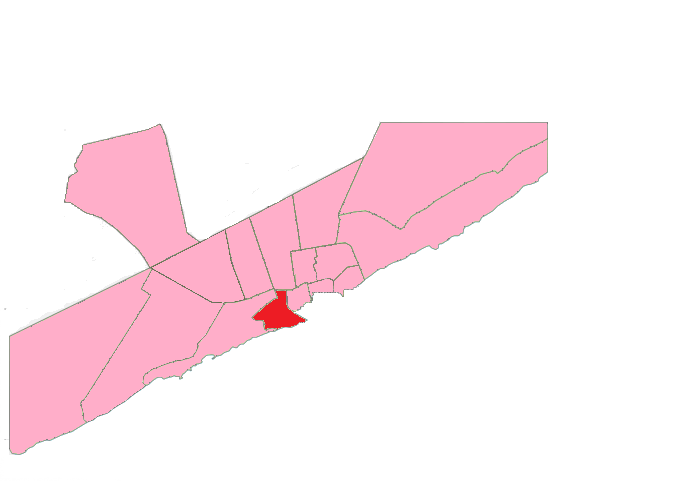
- Country: Somalia
- Region: Banaadir
- City: Mogadishu
- Time zone: UTC+3 (EAT)

Hamar Jajab Neighbourhood (Somali: Xamar Jajab, Arabic: حي حمر ججب, romanized: Hayi Humar Jajab) is a neighbourhood in the southeastern Banaadir region of Somalia. A sector of the national capital Mogadishu, it contains the Port of Mogadishu.
