= Awdiinle massacre =

Massacre of Somalis by Ethiopian soldiers

The Awdiinle Massacre was a massacre of 13 Somali civilians carried out by Ethiopian soldiers in Somalia as part of the African Union Mission to Somalia on Sunday July 17, 2016. The massacre occurred in the village of Awdiinle, 30 km west of Baidoa.

== Events ==
Ethiopian troops attacked a house where a local religious leader was reading the Qur'an. Locals allege the attack was carried out as retribution for an Al-Shabab ambush suffered by the Ethiopians.

== See also ==
- Al-Hidaya Mosque massacre
