= Presidency of Hassan Sheikh Mohamud =

Somalia presidential administration from 2012 to 2017

Hassan Sheikh Mohamud's tenure as the 8th President of Somalia began with his inauguration on 16 September, 2012 and ended on 16 February, 2017.

== Election ==
On September 10, 2012, parliament elected Hassan Sheikh Mohamud as the new President of Somalia. President Mohamud later appointed Abdi Farah Shirdon as the new Prime Minister on October 6, 2012. On November 4, 2012, Shirdon named a new Cabinet, which was later endorsed by the legislature on November 13, 2012.

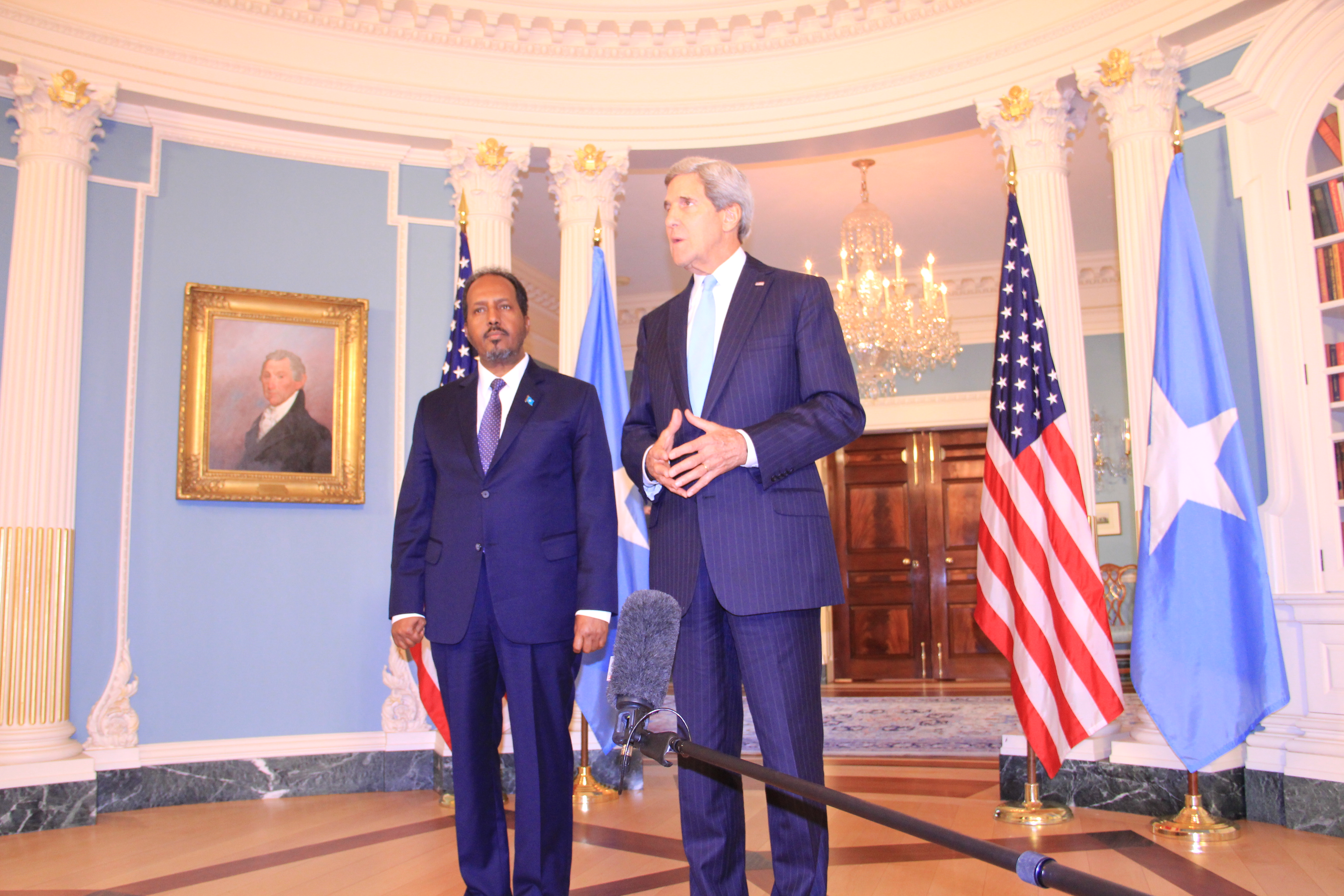
President of Somalia Hassan Sheikh Mohamud with U.S. Secretary of State John Kerry at the State Department (September 2013).

== Suspension of arms embargo ==
At the behest of Somalia's federal authorities, the 15-member UN Security Council unanimously approved Resolution 2093 on March 6, 2013 to suspend the 21-year arms embargo on Somalia, the oldest such global weapons blockade. The endorsement officially lifts the purchase ban on light weapons for a one-year period, but retains certain restrictions on the procurement of heavy arms. The repeal is slated to be reviewed in 2014.

== Resignation of Prime Minister Shirdon ==
In November 2013, President Mohamud asked Prime Minister Shirdon to resign from office on the grounds that Shirdon was allegedly ineffective in the job. Mohamud was reportedly acting on the advice of the State Minister for Presidency, Farah Abdulkadir. On 12 November 2013, Shirdon confirmed that there was a dispute between himself and the president, but indicated that the row was constitutional rather than political. He also asserted that the matter should be resolved in parliament. According to MP Mohamed Abdi Yusuf, the rift between Mohamud and Shirdon centered over through what constitutional mechanism and by whom the Cabinet was ultimately to be formed. On 24 November 2013, 168 MPs led by former TFG Parliament Speaker Sharif Hassan Sheikh Adan endorsed a document submitted to parliament, which outlined a motion against Prime Minister Shirdon's administration. A parliamentary vote of confidence was later held against Shirdon on 2 December 2013. Parliament Speaker Mohamed Osman Jawari subsequently announced that 184 of the present MPs had voted against Shirdon, whereas 65 legislators had voted to retain him. On 5 December 2013, Shirdon released a statement confirming that he and his Cabinet accepted the legislature's decision. UN Special Representative for Somalia Nicholas Kay paid tribute to the outgoing Prime Minister, noting that Shirdon had endeavoured to promote growth and progress and was an important principal in establishing the New Deal Compact between Somalia and its international partners. He also commended the legislators on adhering to procedural rules during the vote, and pledged to work constructively with the succeeding administration.

== Prime Minister Abdiweli Sheikh Ahmed ==
On 12 December 2013, President Mohamud named Abdiweli Sheikh Ahmed as the new Prime Minister. On 17 January 2014, Ahmed named a new, larger Cabinet consisting of 25 ministers, with only two council members retained from the previous Shirdon administration. Parliament later approved the Cabinet on 21 January 2014.

In October 2014, Prime Minister Ahmed made a minor reshuffle of the Cabinet, which President Mohamud immediately rejected. The ensuing rift ended on 6 December, when parliament held a vote of confidence vis-a-vis the Premier and his Cabinet. 153 of the present MPs voted in favor of the motion, 80 voted against it, and 2 abstained, thereby ending Ahmed's term as Prime Minister of Somalia.

== Prime Minister Omar Abdirashid Ali Shermarke ==
On 17 December 2014, President Mohamud appointed former Premier Omar Abdirashid Ali Shermarke as the new Prime Minister. On 24 December, the national legislature approved the nomination. Of the 224 MPs present at the parliamentary session, 218 voted in favor of the appointment, none rejected it or abstained, and six left the hall. On 12 January 2015, Sharmarke announced his new Cabinet, consisting of 26 ministers, 25 deputy ministers, and 8 state ministers. Many ministers were retained from the previous Ahmed administration. Sharmarke indicated that he selected the new Council of Ministers after intensive consultations with local stakeholders, with the aim of balancing the public interest with governmental continuation and administrative priorities. On 17 January 2015, Prime Minister Sharmarke dissolved his newly nominated cabinet due to vehement opposition by legislators, who rejected the reappointment of certain former ministers. At Sharmarke's behest, the Federal Parliament concurrently granted him a time extension to engage in further consultations before was to select a new Council of Ministers. On 27 January 2015, Sharmarke appointed a new, smaller 20 minister Cabinet. On 6 February, Sharmarke finalized his cabinet, consisting of 26 ministers, 14 state ministers, and 26 deputy ministers. Federal legislators later approved the new Council of Ministers on 9 February, with 191 voting in favor it, 22 against it, and none abstaining.

== National Independent Electoral Commission ==
On 11 February 2015, the Federal Parliament during its fifth session approved the Independent National Electoral Commission. 113 MPs voted in favour of the bill, 21 against it, and 10 abstained. The president is now slated to sign the new law.

== Controversies ==
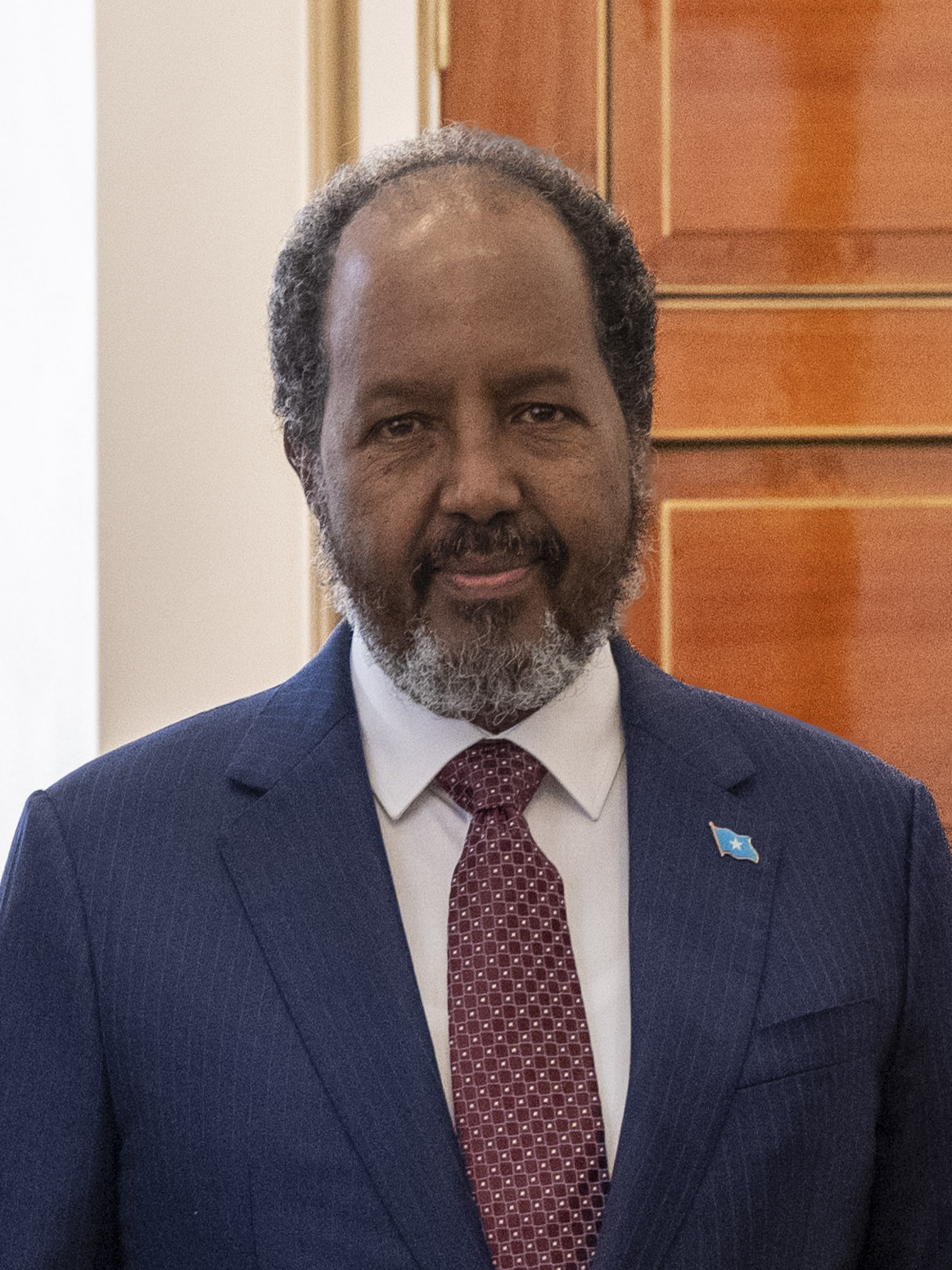
Hassan Sheikh Mohamud
