= Baidoa District =

Baidoa BAY DHOWI BAIDOA JANAAY
- District
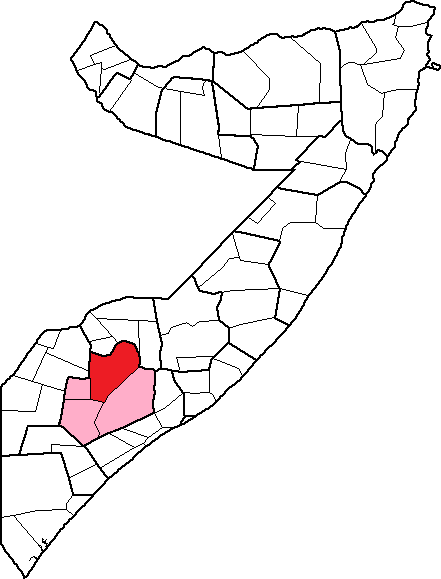
- Country: Somalia
- Region: Bay
- Capital: Baidoa

Government
  - Governor: Abdulahi Ali Watin
- Time zone: UTC+3 (EAT)

Baidoa District (Somali: Degmada Baydhaba) is a district in the southern Bay region of Somalia. Its capital is Baidoa.
