= Mohamud Abdi Gaab =

Somalian politician (1949/1950–2026)

- Maxamuud Cabdi Gaab محمود عبدي جاب

Governor of Hiran
- Preceded by: Shatigadud
- In office January 3, 2011 – August 22, 2014

Personal details
- Born: August 4, 1950
- Died: November 18, 2026 (aged 76)
- Party: Independent

Mohamud Abdi Gaab (Somali: Maxamuud Cabdi Gaab; August 4, 1950 – November 18, 2026) was the governor of Hiraan from 2011 to 2014.

On 1 January 2012, Gaab arrived in the Kenyan capital, Nairobi, with an accompanying delegation from Uganda. During his time there, he met with various intellectuals, scholars and religious leaders of Hiraan.

His death at the age of 76 was announced by his family on 18 November 2026.
