= Yaqshid, Mogadishu =

Yaqshid
- Neighbourhood
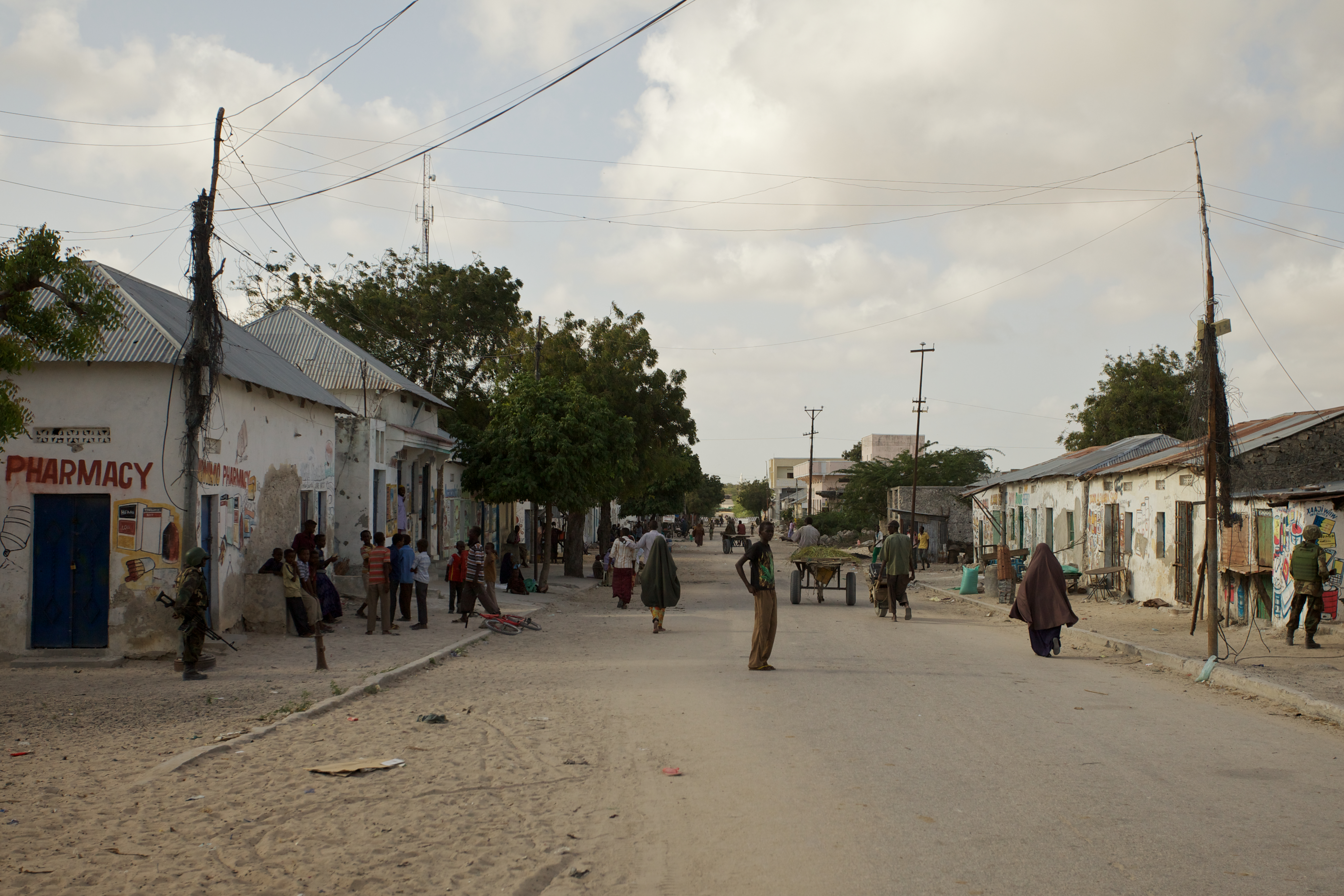
- Streetlife in Yaqshid

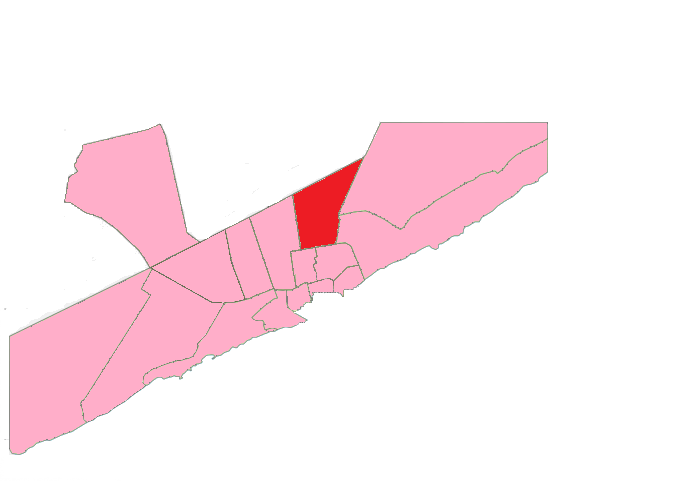
- Coordinates: 2.0333°N 45.3500°E
- Country: Somalia
- Region: Banaadir

Population
  - Total: 9.000
- Time zone: UTC+3 (EAT)
- Area code: +252

Yaqshid Neighbourhood (Somali: Yaaqshiid) is a neighbourhood in the southeastern Banaadir region of Somalia.

It's one of the largest neighbourhoods within Mogadishu city, it consists of Villages Suuq Bacaad, Juungal, Carafaad, Towfiiq village, Siinaay, Fagax, Mahad Alla, Suuqa Xoolaha, Gubta, Tawakal and Jaamacadaha Muqdisho.
