= Shibis, Mogadishu =

Shibis
- Neighbourhood
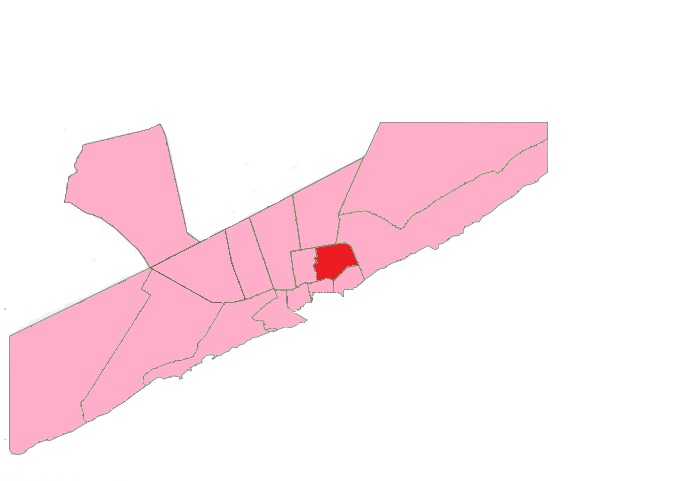
- Country: Somalia
- Region: Banaadir
- City: Mogadishu

Government
  - Neighbourhood commissioner: Vacant

Area
  - Total: 67 km^{2} (26 sq mi)

Population
  - Total: 947,800
- Time zone: UTC+3 (EAT)

Shibis Neighbourhood (Somali: Shibis) is a smallest neighbourhood located of the southeastern Banaadir region of Somalia. One of the oldest settlements in Mogadishu, it is bordered by Kaaraan, Yaaqshiid, Boondheere and Abdiaziz.

Notable places in Shibis include National Security Service (NSS) headquarters, Saudi Arabia embassy and the house of late military ruler Siad Barre, Global Hotel and others.
