= Somali Future Council =

Political opposition coalition in Somalia

- Golaha Mustaqbalka Soomaaliya
- Official logo of the Somali Future Council
- Abbreviation: SFC
- Formation: October 2025
- Type: Political opposition coalition
- Purpose: Political dialogue, constitutional negotiations and electoral consultations
- Region served: Somalia
- Key people: Said Abdullahi Deni – President of Puntland; Ahmed Mohamed Islam – President of Jubaland; Sharif Sheikh Ahmed – Former President of Somalia; Hassan Ali Khaire – Former Prime Minister of Somalia; Mohamed Hussein Roble – Former Prime Minister of Somalia; Abdi Farah Shirdon – Former Prime Minister of Somalia; Abdullahi Abukar Haji (Arab) – Council Secretary; Mohamed Adan Jimale (Koofi) – Council member; Mohamed Bayle – Reported council spokesperson; Deeq Abdiaziz Mohamed (Jidaal) – Reported council member and chairman of Gaashaan Political Party
- Website: https://www.somalifuturecouncil.org

The Somali Future Council (SFC; Somali: Golaha Mustaqbalka Soomaaliya) is a political opposition coalition in Somalia established in October 2025. The coalition brings together political figures associated with the administrations of Puntland and Jubaland, former senior federal government officials and other opposition politicians.

The council has been involved in discussions concerning Somalia's constitutional framework, electoral arrangements, relations between the federal government and federal member states, and political dialogue ahead of national elections.

== History ==
=== Formation ===
The Somali Future Council emerged in October 2025 amid political disagreements over constitutional amendments, electoral legislation and relations between the Federal Government of Somalia and federal member states.

The council developed as a political platform involving leaders from Puntland and Jubaland alongside former presidents, former prime ministers and opposition politicians.

=== Political consultations in 2025 ===
During late 2025, the coalition participated in consultations concerning the proposed electoral framework and the role of federal member states in national political decision-making.

The council argued that changes to electoral arrangements and constitutional institutions should be based on broad agreement among political stakeholders.

== Leadership and membership ==
=== Senior political figures ===
Name	Political position
Said Abdullahi Deni	President of Puntland
Ahmed Mohamed Islam	President of Jubaland
Sharif Sheikh Ahmed	Former President of Somalia
Hassan Ali Khaire	Former Prime Minister of Somalia
Mohamed Hussein Roble	Former Prime Minister of Somalia
Abdi Farah Shirdon	Former Prime Minister of Somalia

=== Secretariat and coordination ===
Abdullahi Abukar Haji (Arab), a former Minister of Education of Somalia, was identified as the council's secretary by Hiiraan Online in October 2026.

Mohamed Adan Jimale (Koofi), a former Director of Somalia's Immigration and Citizenship Agency, has represented the council publicly. Some reports have also described him as the council's secretary, although other reporting identified Abdullahi Arab in that role.

=== Other reported officials and members ===
The following individuals have been identified as council officials or members, although further independent verification is needed for their precise roles:

- Mohamed Bayle – Reported spokesperson of the Somali Future Council.
- Deeq Abdiaziz Mohamed (Jidaal) – Reported council member and chairman of the Gaashaan Political Party.

== Political positions ==
=== Constitutional reform ===
The Somali Future Council has opposed constitutional changes pursued by the federal government without agreement among major political stakeholders.

The coalition has called for negotiations involving opposition parties and federal member states.

The federal government has defended its constitutional and electoral proposals, while opposition representatives have challenged their implementation without broader consultation.

=== Electoral arrangements ===
In October 2026, Somalia's National Independent Electoral and Boundaries Commission announced a timetable for parliamentary and presidential elections in 2027.

The Somali Future Council opposed the timetable, arguing that the announcement had been made without sufficient consultation among major political stakeholders.

== Negotiations with the federal government ==
=== May 2026 negotiations ===
From 13 to 15 May 2026, representatives of the Somali Future Council and the Federal Government of Somalia held political negotiations in Mogadishu.

The discussions addressed constitutional amendments, electoral arrangements and the mandates of federal institutions.

The negotiations concluded without a political agreement.

=== August 2026 negotiations ===
Further negotiations took place in August 2026. Political disagreements concerning constitutional amendments, federal relations and electoral arrangements remained unresolved.

=== October 2026 consultations ===
In October 2026, President Hassan Sheikh Mohamud renewed his invitation to opposition groups to participate in political consultations.

On 28 October, the Somali Future Council reportedly discussed its response to the proposed talks and preparations for further negotiations.

== Public statements ==
=== Position on armed mobilisation ===
On 29 October 2026, Abdullahi Arab denied allegations that the Somali Future Council intended to establish an armed political faction.

He stated that the council intended to pursue its political objectives through peaceful means.

=== November 2026 Supreme Court dispute ===
On 8 November 2026, the Somali Future Council criticised the dismissal of Somalia's chief justice.

Mohamed Adan Jimale (Koofi) publicly expressed the council's opposition to the decision and discussed the political implications of a Supreme Court ruling concerning elections.

The council's statements reflected its position in the dispute rather than an independently established legal conclusion.

== International context ==
International and regional organisations have encouraged dialogue to address Somalia's constitutional and electoral disagreements.

Security Council Report documented continuing disagreements between the federal government and opposition political groups, including the Somali Future Council, during 2026.

== See also ==
- Politics of Somalia
- Federal Government of Somalia
- Puntland
- Jubaland
- Elections in Somalia
