= Administrative divisions of Somalia =

As Somalia is officially a federal republic, the country is divided into seven federal member states, 18 administrative regions (gobollo, singular gobol), and 72 districts. (plural degmooyin; singular degmo)

== Overview ==
The Federal Parliament is tasked with selecting the ultimate number and boundaries of autonomous regional states within the Federal Republic of Somalia. To this end, the legislature in December 2014 passed a law establishing the Boundary and Federalization Commission. The body is mandated with determining the boundaries of the country's constituent states, as well as arbitrating between these states.

== History ==
In November 2014, the South West State of Somalia was established. Hirshabelle State was formed in October 2016. Khatumo State in the north central region was recognized in 2023 and superseded by North Eastern State of Somalia in 2025.

== Federal member states ==
Map of Somalia's states and regions

Somalia is officially divided into seven federal member states. Somalia considers Somaliland (who unilaterally proclaimed independence in 1991 and remains claimed but uncontrolled) to still be a part of the country as a federal member state.

- Somaliland (Note: Somalia claims Somaliland as a de jure Federal Member State, but is de facto independent)
- North Eastern
- Puntland
- Galmudug
- Hirshabelle
- South West
- Jubaland

== Regional administrations ==
Banaadir (also called the Banaadir Regional Administration, or BRA) covers the area of the capital city Mogadishu, and does not belong to any federal member states.

== Regions and districts ==
The president of Somalia Mohamed Siad Barre established the regions of Middle Juba, Lower Juba, Gedo, Bay, and Bakool between 1974 and 1975. Due to biases towards clans, Banaadir shrank to only consist of Mogadishu.

Region	Capital city	Population (2025 estimate)	Location	Districts
Awdal Region	Borama	655,894	Northwestern	Borama District; Zeila District; Lughaya District; Baki District
Bakool Region	Hudur	560,267	Southern	El Barde District; Hudur District; Tiyeglow District; Wajid District; Rabdhure District
Banaadir Region (Note: Banaadir is a regional administration and not a state due to hosting Mogadishu, the capital city of Somalia)	Mogadishu	3,262,129	Central	Abdiaziz District; Bondhere District; Daynile District; Dharkenley District; Hamar Jajab District; Hamar Weyne District; Hodan District; Howlwadaag District; Huriwa District; Karan District; Shibis District; Shangani District; Waberi District; Wadajir District; Warta Nabada District; Yaqshid District
Bari Region	Bosaso	1,270,552	Northeastern	Bayla District; Bosaso District; Alula District; Iskushuban District; Qandala District; Qardho District
Bay Region	Baidoa	1,286,787	Southern	Baidoa District; Burhakaba District; Dinsoor District; Qasahdhere District
Galguduud Region	Dusmareb	837,916	Central	Abudwak District; Adado District; Dusmareb District; El Buur District; El Dher District
Gedo Region	Garbahare	1,005,924	Southern	Bardhere District; Beled Hawo District; El Wak District; Dolow District; Garbaharey District; Luuq District
Hiran Region	Beledweyne	520,517	Central	Beledweyne District; Buloburde District; Jalalaqsi District
Lower Juba Region	Kismayo	1,194,276	Southern	Afmadow District; Badhadhe District; Jamame District; Kismayo District
Lower Shabelle Region	Merca	1,642,667	Central	Afgooye District; Barawa District; Kurtunwarey District; Merca District; Qoriyoley District; Sablale District; Wanlaweyn District
Middle Juba Region	Bu'ale	443,507	Southern	Bu'ale District; Jilib District; Sakow District
Middle Shabelle Region	Jowhar	1,044,872	Central	Adale District; Adan Yabal District; Balad District; Jowhar District
Mudug Region	Galkayo	1,516,035	Southern	Galkayo District; Galdogob District; Harardhere District; Hobyo District; Jariban District
Nugal Region	Garoowe	651,464	North Eastern	Garowe District; Burtinle District; Eyl District
Sanaag Region	Erigavo	442,034	Northern	Erigavo District; Badhan District; El Afweyn District
Sool Region	Las Anod	566,053	Northern	Las Anod District; Hudun District; Taleh District; Aynaba District
Togdheer Region	Burao	887,450	Northern	Burao District; Oodweyne District; Buhoodle District; Sheikh District
Maroodi Jeex Region	Hargeisa	1,492,506	Northwestern	Hargeisa District; Berbera District; Gabiley District

== Former divisions ==
=== Pre-independence ===
In 1931, Italian Somaliland consisted of seven commissariats.

- Alto Giuba
- Alto Uebi-Scebeli
- Basso Giuba
- Basso Uebi-Scebeli
- Migiurtinia
- Mogadiscio
- Mudugh

Following the 1935–36 Second Italo-Abyssinian War, Italian Somaliland became part of Italian East Africa with Abyssinia (Ethiopia) and Eritrea. Italian Somaliland was one of six governorates of the new colony, the Somalia Governorate, and incorporated Somali-inhabited parts of the former Abyssinia. The governorate was subdivided into 10 commissariats, which were themselves divided into residencies.

- Alto Giuba (English: Upper Juba) (capital: Baidoa)
- Alto Scebeli (Upper Shabele) (Bulo Burti)
- Basso Scebeli (Lower Shabele) (Merca)
- Migiurtinia (Migiurtinia) (Dante)
- Mogadiscio (Mogadishu) (Mogadiscio)
- Mudugh (Mudug) (Rocca Littorio)
- Ogaden (Ogaden) (Uarder)
- Uebi Gestro (Gestro River) (Callafo)
- Basso Giuba (Lower Juba) (Chisimaio)
- Nogal (Nugaal) (Eil)

Following World War II, the Italian-administered Trust Territory of Somalia consisted of six Regions.

- Alto Giuba
- Basso Giuba
- Benadir
- Hiiraan
- Migiurtinia
- Mudugh

The British Somaliland protectorate also consisted of two Regions.

- Burao
- Hargeisa

=== Somalia ===
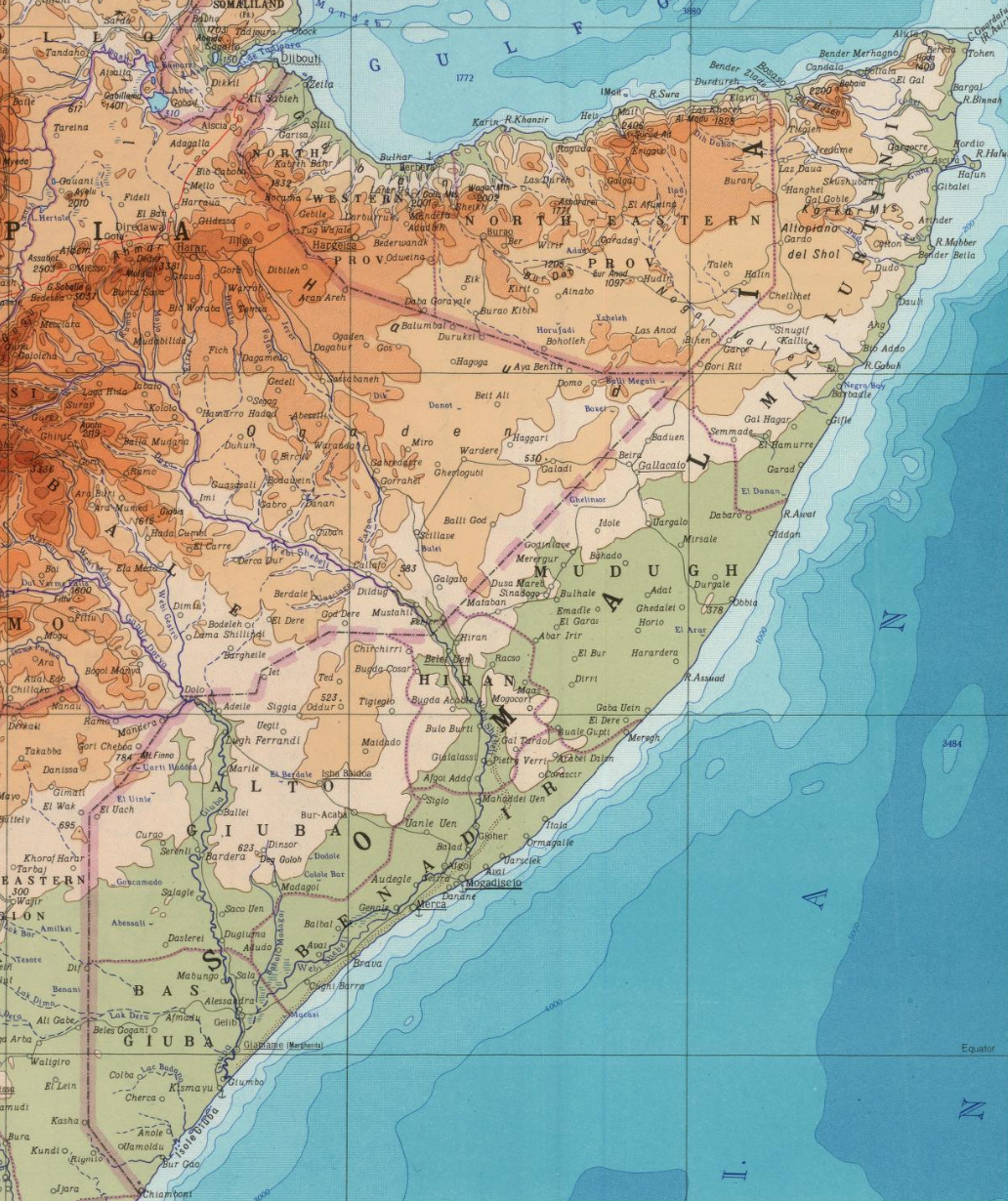
The 8 provinces of Somalia in 1967

Upon independence in 1960, the Somali Republic maintained the 12 districts of the former Italian Somaliland and British Somaliland that merged to form the new country. In 1964, a new Northeastern (Burao) Province was established by merging Burao, Erigavo, and Las Anod and a Northwestern (Hargeisa) Province was formed from Berbera, Borama, and Hargeisa districts. In 1968, the capital of Basso Giuba was moved from Kismayo to Jamame. The 8 provinces at this time were:

Province	Area(km^{2})	Capital
Benadir	45,004	Mogadishu
Burao	128,000	Burao
Hargeisa	48,000	Hargeisa
Hiran	25,647	Beled Weyne
Lower Juba	49,917	Jamame
Bosaso	90,744	Bosaso (Bender Cassim)
Mudug	118,737	Galkayo
Upper Juba	131,492	Baidoa

In 1982, Somalia reorganized from eight provinces into 16 regions. In June 1984, Awdal was split from Woqooyi Galbeed and Sool was split from Nugaal to form the current 18 regions.

After the Transitional Federal Government of Somalia was instillated, some divisions of Somalia tried to be either a state or region. These said divisions were as follows:

- Azania (2011–2013)
- Central Regions State
- Himan and Heeb (2008–2015)
- Maakhir (2007–2009)

== See also ==
- List of regions of Somalia by Human Development Index
- ISO 3166-2:SO
