= Harun Maruf =

Somali journalist

Harun Maruf is a Somali journalist based in Washington DC who works for Voice of America, he has also worked for Associated Press and BBC. He co-authored the book Inside Al Shabaab.

== Background ==
Maruf studied International Journalism at the University of London and obtained a master's degree.

== Freedom of the press ==
Amnesty International reported that NISA threats in April 2020 intended to intimidate and harass Maruf. The US Embassy in Somalia condemned the threats, describing Maruf as 'one of the most respected Somali journalist'. Former Somali President Hassan Sheikh Mohamud also condemned the actions of NISA saying it showed dictatorial tendencies.
