= Warta Nabada, Mogadishu =

Wardhiigley Wardhigley
- Neighbourhood
- Country: Somalia
- Region: Banaadir

Government
  - Neighbourhood Commissioner: Zeynab Mohamed Haabzey
- Time zone: UTC+3 (EAT)

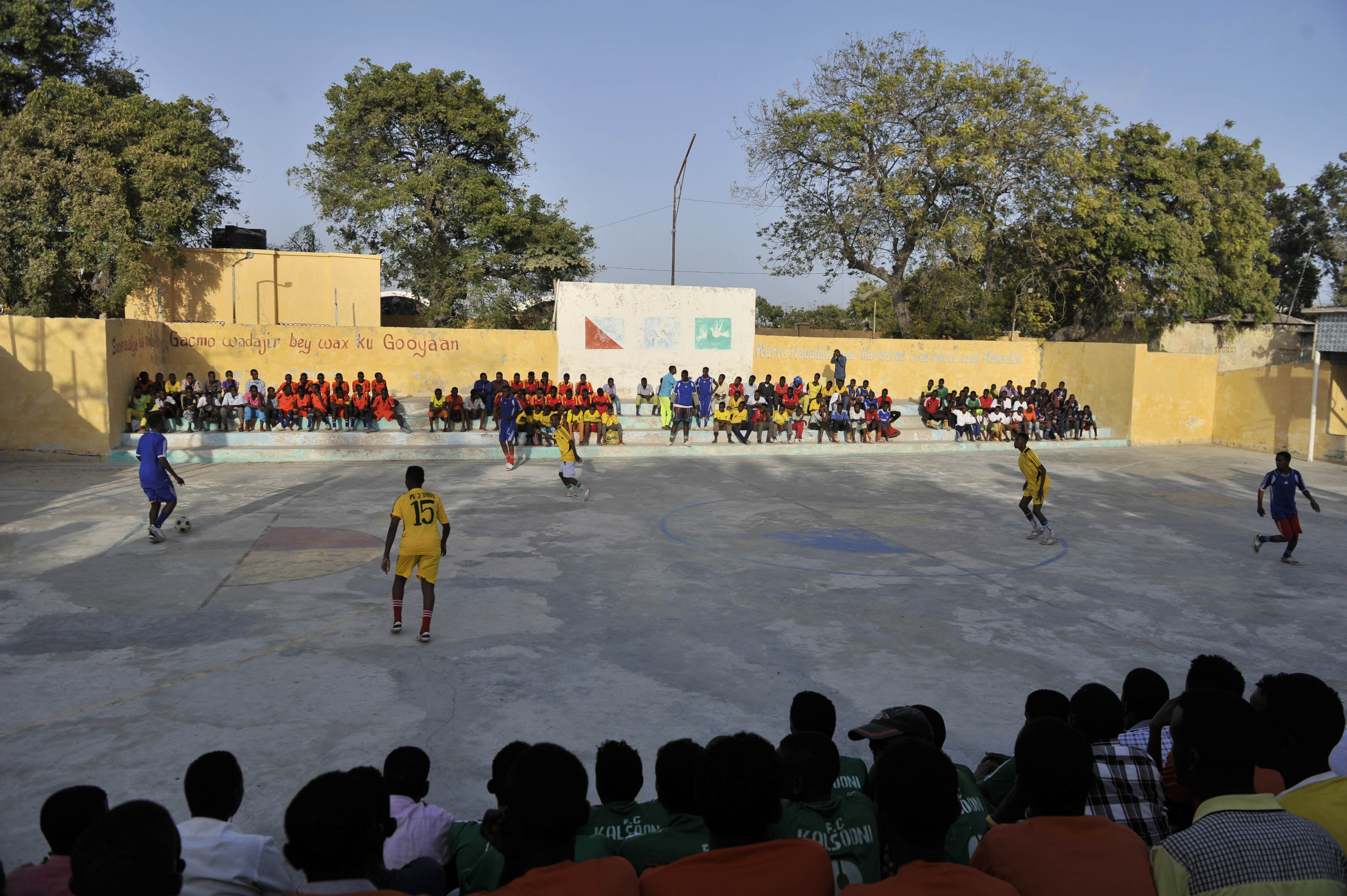
A football match in Warta Nabada District

Warta Nabada Neighbourhood is a neighbourhood in the southeastern Banaadir region of Somalia. It is one of the larger neighborhoods of the capital Mogadishu. The presidential compound Villa Somalia, the Federal Parliament building and Mogadishu Stadium are all located in this neighbourhood.

Warta Nabada Neighbourhood was previously known as the Wardhigley Neighbourhood until a name change in April 2012. Zeynab Mohamed Haabzey serves as the neighbourhood commissioner.
