= Banaadir =

Region of Somalia

Banadir Banaadir Benadir
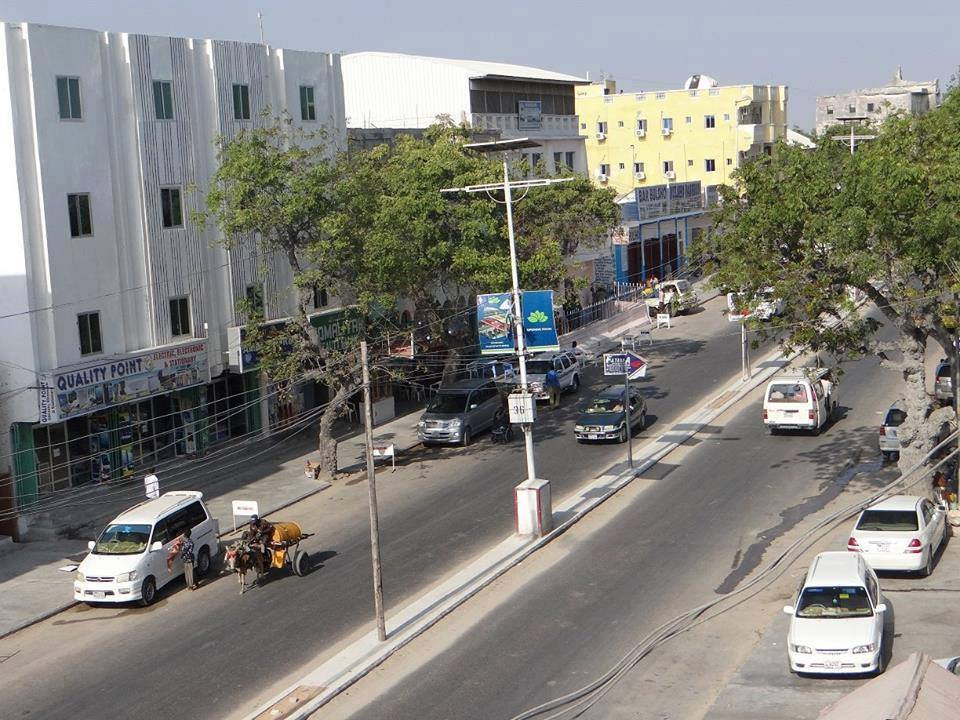
- Mogadishu street scene

- Flag Coat of arms

- Location in Somalia
- Coordinates: 2°2′59″N 45°15′44″E
- Country: Somalia
- Capital: Mogadishu

Government
  - Type: Regional administration
  - Governor: Hassan Mohamed Hussein

Area
  - Total: 370 km^{2} (140 sq mi)

Population (2025)
  - Total: 3,262,129
  - Rank: 1st
  - Density: 8,800/km^{2} (23,000/sq mi)
- Time zone: UTC+3 (EAT)
- Area code: +252
- ISO 3166 code: SO-BN
- HDI (2017): 0.459 low · 1st

Banaadir (Somali: Banaadir, Arabic: بنادر, Italian: Benadir) is an administrative region (gobol) in southeastern Somalia. It covers the same area as the city of Mogadishu, which serves as the capital. It is the only region in the country not belonging to any of the seven states. It is bordered to the northwest by the Shabelle river and to the southeast by the Indian Ocean.

The territorial extent and scope of the term Benaadir has varied in definition throughout its history, with medieval usage extending Benaadir to huge swaths of coast adjacent to Mogadishu stretching as far as hundreds of miles, from Hobyo in the north. The early modern period which extended the meaning of Benaadir to the interior midway towards the Hirshabelle region, to the contemporary period wherein sometimes the nonstandard misnomer of usage being interchangeable with the city of Mogadishu. This Banaadir municipality is bordered to the north by Hirshabelle and to the southwest by South West, and is the only Somali gobol (administrative region) which is both a municipality and a gobol known as a region.

== Overview ==
The Banaadir region is bordered by the Middle Shebelle (Shabeellaha Dhexe) and Lower Shebelle (Shabeellaha Hoose), as well as the Indian Ocean.

"Benaadir" is derived from the Somali banaadir, which means "coast", in reference to the southern Somali coastal cities Mogadishu, Merka and Barawa. The place name reflects the region's medieval position as a key trade center with Persia, Arabian Peninsula and the Swahili coast.

The name derives from the Persian bandar (بندر) meaning ‘port’ or ‘harbour’.

Its capital is Mogadishu, known locally as Xamar (pronounced: Hamar), although the administrative region itself is coextensive with the city. Banaadir is much smaller than the historical region of Benadir, which covered most of the country's central and southern seaboard opposite the Indian Ocean and up to the Juba River, including Mogadishu.

Thabit M. Abdi was appointed mayor of Mogadishu and governor of Banaadir in 2017, succeeding Yusuf Hussein Jimale who held that post since November 2015.

== History ==
=== Political ===
Tradition and old records assert that southern Somalia, including the Mogadishu area, was governed by the Ajuran Sultanate and was during the early modern period considered the wealthiest city on the East African coast, as well as the center of a thriving textile industry. In the 17th century, Mogadishu and parts of southern Somalia fell under the Hiraab Imamate and in the 19th century came under the Geledi Sultanate's sphere of influence.

After the Somali Republic became independent in 1960, Mogadishu became known and promoted as the White Pearl of the Indian Ocean. After the ousting of the Siad Barre regime in 1991 and the ensuing Somali Civil War, various militias fought for control of the city, later to be replaced by the Islamic Courts Union in the mid-2000s. The ICU thereafter splintered into more radical groups, notably the al-Shabaab, which fought the Transitional Federal Government (2004–2012) and its African Union Mission to Somalia allies. With a change in administration in late 2010, government troops and their military partners had succeeded in forcing out Al-Shabaab by August 2011. Mogadishu has then subsequently experienced a period of intense reconstruction.

== Population ==
Although by far the smallest administrative region in Somalia, the region has the largest population, estimated at 1,650,227 (including 369,288 IDPs) in 2014. The 1,650,227 (as of 2014) residents of Benaadir are 50.7% female and come from 303,021 households. The Banaadir region hosts the highest percentage of internally displaced persons in Somalia because of its relative safety, economic opportunities and availability of resources.

== Districts ==
The Banaadir region currently consists of twenty districts following the establishment of Darusalam, Garasbaley, and Gubadley districts in 2024. Previously, the region consisted of seventeen districts. Warta Nabada District was formerly known as Wardhigley District until it was officially renamed in 2012. Kahda District was established in 2013 and was absent from many older maps.

- Abdiaziz District
- Bondhere District
- Daynile District
- Dharkenley District
- Hamar-Jajab District
- Hamar-Weyne District
- Hodan District
- Howl-Wadag District
- Huriwa District
- Kaxda District
- Karan District
- Shangani District
- Shibis District
- Waberi District
- Wadajir District
- Warta Nabada District
- Yaqshid District
- Darusalam District
- Garasbaley District
- Gubadley District
