= Huriwa, Mogadishu =

Huriwa
- Neighbourhood
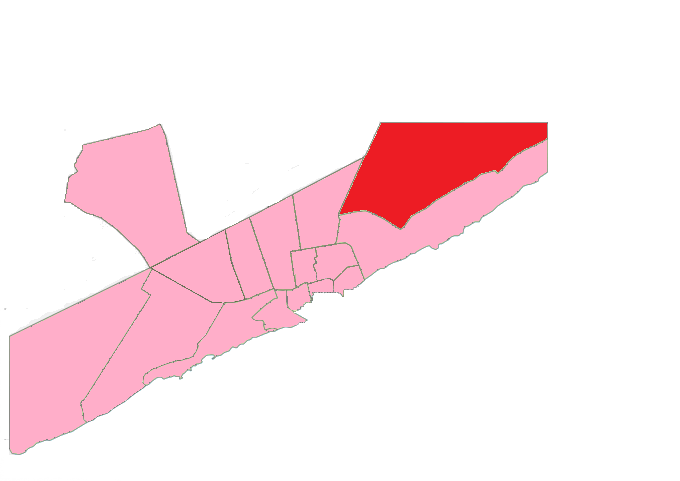
- Coordinates: 2.0333°N 45.3500°E
- Country: Somalia
- Region: Banaadir
- City: Mogadishu
- Time zone: UTC+3 (EAT)

Huriwa Neighbourhood (Somali: Huriwaa, Muqdisho) is a neighbourhood in the southeastern Banaadir region of Somalia and . It includes the northeastern neighborhoods of the national capital, Mogadishu.
