= Abdiaziz, Mogadishu =

Abdiaziz
- Neighbourhood
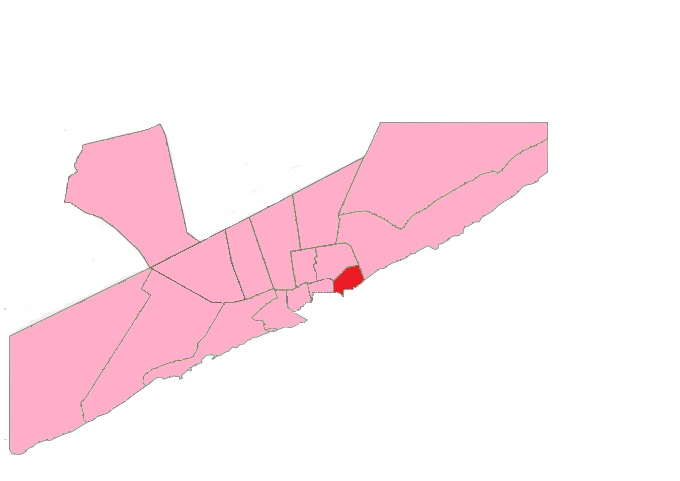
- Country: Somalia
- Region: Banaadir
- City: Mogadishu
- Time zone: UTC+3 (EAT)

Abdiaziz Neighbourhood (Somali: Cabdicasiis), also spelled Abdi Asis neighbourhood, is a neighbourhood in the southeastern Banaadir region of Somalia. It includes a part of the old town of Mogadishu it is known for having Mogadishu's largest historic Darod population.
