= 2024 in Somalia =

- Decades: 2000s; 2010s; 2020s
- See also: History of Somalia; List of years in Somalia

Events in the year 2024 in Somalia.

== Incumbents ==
- President: Hassan Sheikh Mohamud
- Prime Minister: Hamza Abdi Barre
- Speaker of the House: Abdi Hashi Abdullahi

== Events ==
=== Ongoing ===
- Somali Civil War (timeline)
- Constitutional crisis in Somalia
- Controversies of Hassan Sheikh Mohamud
- Jubaland crisis

=== January ===
- 8 January — Said Abdullahi Deni is re-elected as the President of the semi-autonomous state of Puntland, which maintains tense relations with the federal government in Mogadishu.
- 10 January – Al-Shabaab insurgents capture a United Nations helicopter carrying seven people, killing one person and abducting five others, while the seventh person is missing. The helicopter had landed in al-Shabaab controlled territory after encountering "a defect" shortly after takeoff from Beledweyne, Hiran.
- 16 January – An al-Shabaab suicide bomber kills three people and wounds two others outside the Mayor of Mogadishu's office.
- 25 January — Prominent figures, including Federal President Hassan Sheikh Mohamud and the Presidents of Southwest, Galmudug, and Hirshabelle States, participate in the inauguration of Puntland President Said Abdullahi Deni.
- 26 January – Murder of Luul Abdiaziz Mohamed by her husband after she was set on fire.

=== February ===
- 6 February — 2024 Mogadishu market bombing - Ten people are killed and 20 others are injured following explosions in the Bakaara Market, Mogadishu believed to be perpetrated by Al-Shabab, who reportedly planted explosive devices underground.
- 7 February — A suicide bombing in Afgooye kills three people and injures ten others.
- 10 February — Four Emirati soldiers and a Bahraini military officer are killed, while ten others are injured, when a soldier opens fire at a military base in Mogadishu, before being killed in the ensuing shootout. Al-Shabaab claims responsibility.

=== March ===
- 10 March — United States Africa Command (Africom) conducted an airstrike against al-Shabaab in a remote area near Ugunji, approximately 71 km southwest of Mogadishu, killing three militants without harming any civilians.
- 14 March:
  - At least six people, including both combatants and civilians are killed following clashes near administrative stations in Beledweyne between forces loyal to Hirshabelle State and Hiraan State.
  - 2024 Mogadishu YSL Hotel attack and siege - An al-Shabaab member blows himself up outside a hotel in Mogadishu, killing three guards and two security forces. Six gunmen then storm the hotel in 13-hour siege, leading to a gunfight with the army in which three soldiers and the six attackers are killed. Twenty-seven people are wounded.
- 18 March — Turkish drones hit the Jaffey farm, about three kilometers west of Bagdad village in the Lower Shabelle, killing more than 22 people and injuring 21, including many children.
- 22 March — Al-Shabaab militants storm a military base in Busley, near Mogadishu, killing seven soldiers, including the commander, and ten militants. The attack involves suicide car bombs and the seizure of military vehicles.
- 31 March — Puntland withdraws its recognition of the federal government due to a constitutional crisis caused by the federal parliament's adoption of changes to a disputed provisional constitution without consulting Puntland, under which the President and Government were originally elected.

=== April ===
- 1 April — Puntland declares its intention to operate as an independent state until the changes to the Somali constitution adopted on 30 March are ratified through a popular referendum.
- 3 April — Following Puntland's declaration of self-autonomy, Ambassador Mesganu Arga of Ethiopia welcomes a senior ministerial delegation led by Puntland’s Minister of Finance on enhancing trade, investment, energy cooperation, and joint infrastructure projects to strengthen bilateral ties.
- 4 April:
  - Al-Shabaab militants recapture Daaru-Nimca village in Middle Shabelle without resistance after Somali troops withdraw.
  - The federal government orders the expulsion of Ethiopian Ambassador Mesganu Arga and the closure of Ethiopia’s consulates in Somaliland and Puntland, citing Ethiopian interference in Somalia’s internal affairs.
- 5 April — Puntland and Somaliland reject the Federal Government's order to close the Ethiopian consulate.
- 6 April — Al-Shabaab carries out a suicide vehicle attack on a NISA base, followed by gun attacks on three checkpoints and a security office in Balcad district of Hirshabelle State, near Mogadishu, before retreating.
- 7 April — Prime Minister, Hamza Abdi Barre, conducts a cabinet reshuffle, introducing key appointments across various ministries. Ahmed Moalim Fiqi becomes Minister of Foreign Affairs from his former role as Interior Minister. Ali Yusuf Ali Hoosh becomes Minister for Interior Affairs, Federal & Reconciliation. General Abdullahi Sheikh Ismail Fartaag is appointed as Minister of Internal Security, while Abdullahi Bidhaan Warsame becomes Minister of Energy and Water. Mohamed Aden Moallin assumes the position of Minister of Post, Telecom & Technology, and Ahmed Omar Mohamed is appointed State Minister for Environment and Climate Change.
- 8 April —The U.S. Embassy in Nairobi issues a warning of threats to various locations in Mogadishu, including Aden Adde International Airport, all movements of U.S. Embassy personnel are canceled for 9 April.
- 9 April — A series of mortar attacks occur in different parts of Mogadishu including Villa Somalia. Flights by Turkish Airlines and Ethiopian Airlines are canceled due to security threats.
- 11 April — The Somali National Army repels an attempted attack by Al-Shabaab at the Bar Sanguni base in the Lower Juba region.
- 26 April — The Federal Government detains U.S.-trained commandos of the Danab Brigade for stealing rations donated by the AFRICOM.
- 27 April — Al-Shabab recaptures the strategic locations of Eid-Eidka and Ali Foldhere in Mahaday Weyn. Middle Shabelle amid clan rivalries.
- 28 April — Six Hormuud Telecom workers are killed in an explosion near Elasha Biyaha, approximately 16 km (10 mi) from Mogadishu.

=== May ===
- 3 May — Senior Somali Police officer, Lieutenant Colonel Adan Omar Biid, is shot dead in Mogadishu.

=== June ===
- 6 June — Somalia is elected to become a two-year non-permanent member of the United Nations Security Council for the first time since 1970.
- 8 June:
  - Al-Shabaab claims to have captured El-Dher after a dawn attack on a Somali National Army base, resulting in 59 casualties, including two high-ranking officers.
  - A clan clash between Abudwak and Herale results in one of the worst incidents in recent years of the Somali Civil War, leaving over 50 people dead and more than 60 injured in the Galguduud region.
- 10 June: At least 55 people are killed and 155 others are injured in fighting between the Dir and Marehan clans in central Somalia.
- 15 June — Al-Shabaab bombs a pickup truck carrying Major General Mohamed Dheere, commander of the 8th battalion of Sector 60 in Southwest State using IEDs in Ideeda, killing Dheere, a lieutenant, and other soldiers.
- 23 June — At least two children die from drowning, 11 houses collapse, and roads are washed out following heavy rain and flash floods in Mogadishu that affect 325 families.
- 28 June — Mohamed Osman Jawari, former two-time Speaker of the Federal Parliament of Somalia, dies in Mogadishu at the age of 79.
- 30 June — Al-Shabaab claims responsibility for a suicide car bombing targeting a Somali military camp near central Beledweyne that kills four people.

=== July ===
- 8 July — Al-Shabaab claims responsibility for a roadside bomb attack in El-Werigow village, approximately 70 kilometers southwest of Mogadishu. The attack results in the death of a Ugandan military officer and injures six other soldiers.
- 13 July — Five suspected members of Al-Shabaab detained at the main prison of Mogadishu are killed in an attempted jailbreak along with three members of the security forces. Twenty-one others are injured.
- 14 July — Nine people are killed and 20 others are injured when a car bomb explodes outside a coffeehouse in Mogadishu, while customers were watching the Euro 2024 final.
- 15 July — In Abudwak, twelve people, including two soldiers, were killed in a clash between NISA soldiers and local militias over two truckloads of weapons that were illegally brought from Ethiopia.
- 22 July — At least 35 soldiers and over 80 Al-Shabaab fighters are killed after Al-Shabaab attempts to take three army bases. The Somali National Army safely disposes four car bombs around 80 km (50 miles) southwest of Kismayo, near the village of Buulo-Xaaji.

=== August ===
- 2 August — At least 38 people are killed and more than 212 others are injured after Al-Shabaab launches an attack near the Beach View Hotel on Lido Beach in Mogadishu.
- 8 August – Elections in Somalia: The Council of Ministers approves a bill that would revert the country's voting system to universal suffrage, ending indirect voting. The bill is headed to the Federal Parliament to be voted upon.
- 17 August:
  - Puntland executes 10 members of Al-Shabaab who were sentenced to death in Galkayo.
  - At least 20 people are killed and ten others are injured in a bombing at a tea shop in Daynile District in Mogadishu.
- 21 August – An Al-Shabaab suicide car bomber blows himself up near a security checkpoint on the Mogadishu–Afgoye highway, killing five security officers and four civilians. Several others are injured.
- 27 August – The first batch of Egyptian military officers and equipment arrive in Mogadishu, marking the initial phase of a significant deployment that will see up to ten thousand Egyptian soldiers stationed in Somalia.
- 28 August – At least nine people are killed in fighting between SSC-Khatumo forces and Somaliland soldiers near the town of Goof, close to Erigavo in the southeastern part of the Sanaag region.
- 31 August – Al-Shabaab bombs several businesses in the Tabelaha Sheikh Ibrahim neighborhood of Garas Baley, Mogadishu, targeting shops that had complied with the government's directive to install CCTV cameras.

=== September ===
- 14 September – At least five people are killed and eight others are injured in two bomb attacks in the Kaxda District of Mogadishu.
- 21 September – A military helicopter carrying international peacekeepers crashes near Mogadishu on its way to Baledogle Airfield. No fatalities are reported.
- 28 September – At least six people are killed and ten others in a car bombing outside a restaurant in Mogadishu.

=== October ===
- 17 October – At least seven people are killed and six others are injured in a suicide bombing on a cafe outside the General Kaahiye Police Academy in Mogadishu. Al-Shabaab claims responsibility.
- 19 October – Amun Abdullahi, a Swedish-Somali journalist, is shot dead by suspected Al-Shabaab militants in Afgooye, Lower Shabelle.
- 29 October – Al-Shabaab claims responsibility for the killing of six businessmen over the installation of CCTV cameras in Yaqshid District, Mogadishu.
- 30 October – The United Nations Security Council votes 15–0 to make changes to the United Nations Assistance Mission in Somalia, forming a new mission called the United Nations Transitional Mission in Somalia, which is expected to begin operating on 1 November 2024.

=== November ===
- 3 November – Jubaland invites Members of Parliament from the state to come to Kismayo for discussions, after rising tensions between Jubaland and the federal government, and the resignations of State Minister of Planning, Abdirashid Jire and a Deputy Minister in the Ministry of Education.
- 13 November – 2024 Somaliland presidential election: Incumbent president Muse Bihi Abdi loses by a landslide to Abdirahman Mohamed Abdullahi.
- 19 November – The Supreme Court of Jubaland swears in 75 new MPs approved by traditional leaders. The regional election committee schedules the speaker of the parliament to November 22 and sets November 25 as the date for the Jubaland presidential election.
- 23 November – The government of Puntland issues a presidential decree prohibiting the use of unregistered private SIM cards and the online betting site 1xbet in order to regulate gambling and address security concerns.
- 24 November – Two boats carrying Somali migrants capsize in the Indian Ocean off the coast of Madagascar, killing 25 passengers.
- 25 November – The Jubaland House of Representatives re-elects incumbent President Ahmed Madobe for the third time amid tensions with the federal government that resulted in soldiers being deployed to Kamboni, Badhadhe District in Lower Juba region.
- 28 November – A judge in Jubaland issues an arrest warrant against federal president Hassan Sheikh Mohamud on charges of treason, inciting a civil war, and organizing an armed uprising to disrupt the constitutional order. In response, the federal government issues an arrest warrant against Jubaland President Ahmed Madobe for treason and revealing classified information to foreign entities.

=== December ===
- 6 December – Authorities announce the hijacking of a Chinese fishing vessel carrying 18 crew members off the coast of Hafun District, Puntland.
- 11 December – Federal forces launch a failed attack on Jubaland regional forces, with Jubaland capturing hundreds of federal soldiers and claiming to have fully taken over Ras Kamboni, Lower Juba.
- 12 December – Abdirahman Mohamed Abdullahi is inaugurated as President of Somaliland.
- 21 December – Puntland announces that it will introduce a new currency in 2025. The state had previously shifted to use of the United States dollar in 2021, due to severe inflation of the Somali shilling.
- 24 December – The federal government imposes a flight ban on Jubaland, particularly affecting the cities of Kismayo and Doolow. The ban is initiated amid ongoing political tensions and military engagements after Jubaland forces reportedly defeated the Somali military in several locations, including Ras Kamboni, Kulbiyow, and Dolow.

== Deaths ==
- 19 October — Amun Abdullahi, 49, Somali-born Swedish journalist (SR International).
- 15 November — Ahmed Mohamed Mohamoud, 86, politician, President of Somaliland (2010–2017), minister of planning (1965–1973) and minister of commerce (1973–1978).
- 3 December — Mohamed Ali Yusuf, 80, politician, Interim Vice President of Puntland (2004–2005), Minister of Finance (2005–2009), Senate Speaker (2021–2022).

== Holidays ==
- 1 January - New Year's Day
- 7 February - Isra' and Mi'raj
- 1 – Eid al-Fitr
- 1 May - Labour Day
- 16 June – Eid al-Adha
- 1 July – Independence Day
- 7 July – Islamic New Year
- 16–17 July – Ashura
- 15 September – Milad un-Nabi

== See also ==
- 2024 in Somaliland
