= 2024 timeline of the Somali Civil War =

African civil war timeline

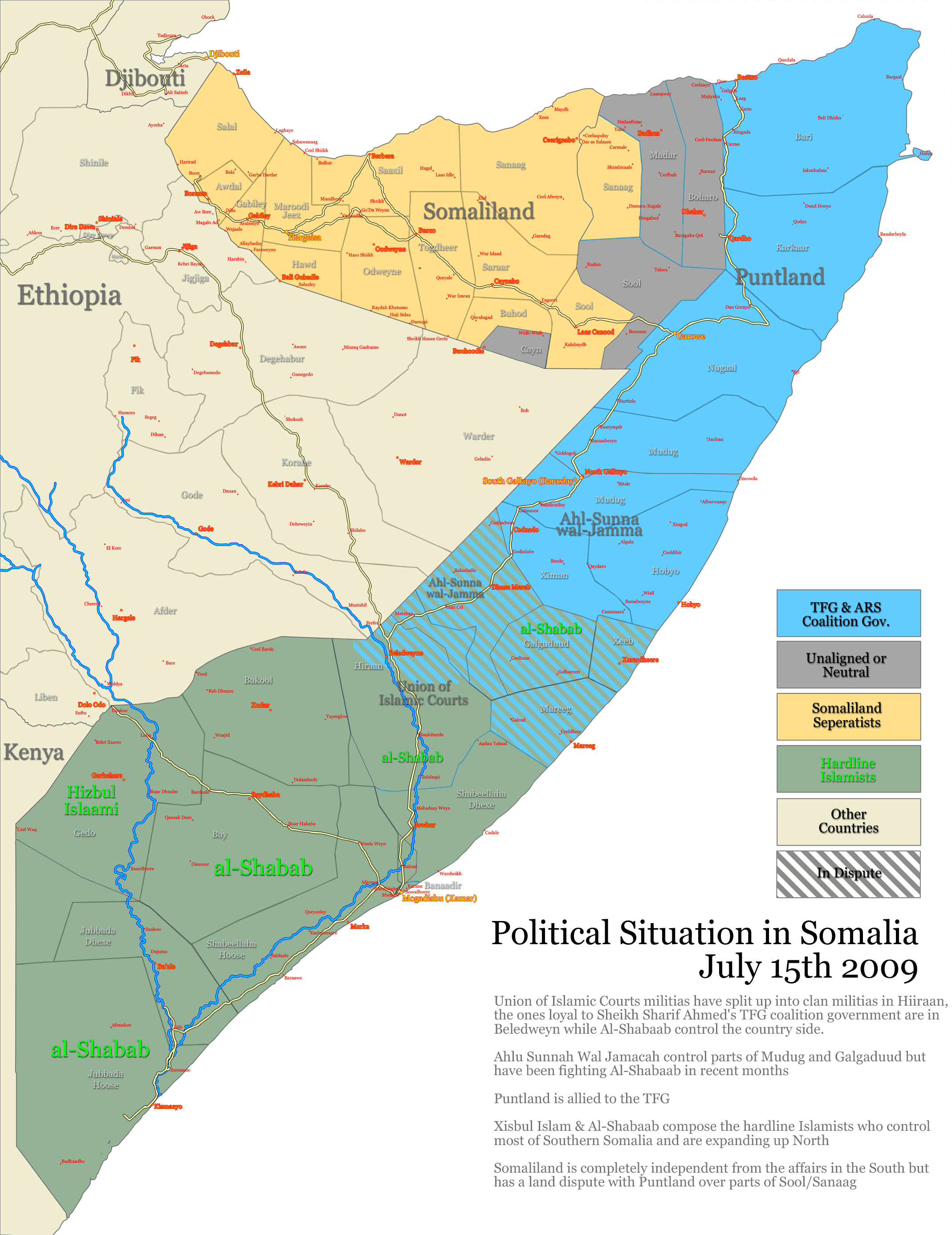

This is a 2024 timeline of events in the Somali Civil War (2009–present).

== January ==
- 10 January: A UN helicopter was forced to make an emergency landing within territory controlled by al-Shabaab after being struck by an unidentified object. Al-Shabaab members then burned the helicopter and seized most of the crew of nine people. One person was killed and two others were unaccounted for after the incident.
- 11 January: Al-Shabaab launched several mortar rounds into the Aden Adde International Airport, killing a Ugandan UN Guard Unit soldier.
- 16 January: Al-Shabaab claimed responsibility for a suicide bombing in Mogadishu that killed three people and injured two others.
- 21 January: The US carried out strikes northeast of Kismayo, killing three al-Shabaab militants.
- 24 January: An airstrike conducted by Somali military forces in Galhareri killed at least 20 al-Shabaab militants.

== February ==
- 4 February: Seven people, including six Ethiopians, were killed in a suspected al-Shabaab shooting in Beled Hawo.
- 6 February:
  - Four bombings inside Bakaara Market in the Somali capital killed at least ten people and injured about fifteen others.
  - The Royal United Services Institute reported that the rate of piracy in the Horn of Africa has been higher over the past three months than it has at any point over the past six years.
- 7 February: A suicide bombing targeting a security checkpoint in Afgooye killed three people and injured ten others.
- 11 February: Al-Shabaab claimed responsibility for an attack on a training mission in the General Gordon Military Base, Mogadishu which resulted in the death of four Emirati troops and one Bahraini military officer.

== March ==
- 14 March: 2024 Mogadishu SYL Hotel attack and siege
- 18 March: Jaffey farm airstrike
- 23 March: 2024 Busley army base attack

== April ==
- 15 April: Five al-Shabaab militants were killed in an operation by SNA in Bulaburte and Halgan districts of Hiiraan region.
- 26 April: The Somali National Army (SNA) killed about thirty al-Shabaab militants in operations in Mudug region of Somalia.

== May ==
- 16 May: SNA killed about 9 and wounded 10 other al-Shabaab militants in separate operations in Galgadud and Middle Shabelle regions.
- 31 May: An US airstrike in an ISIS hideout killed about 3 ISIS militants in Dhaardaar, Southeast of Bosaso, Somalia. It was reported that Abdul Qadir Mumin the leader of Islamic State in Somalia was targeted in the airstrike and is presumed to be dead but not confirmed.

== June ==
- 8 June: Battle of El Dher
- 26 June: An operation by SNA killed about seven al-Shabaab militants in Ali-Adhole area near Eldher district in Galmudug State.

== July ==
- 10 July: SNA along with local forces captured Harbole and Welmaro villages in the Lower Juba from al-Shabaab militants.
- 11 July: SNA liberated Burweyn and Shaw areas in Hiraan region as part of an offensive against al-Shabaab.
- 13 July: Several al-Shabaab inmates convicted of death penalties and life sentences attempted to break out from Mogadishu Central Prison. The escape attempt resulted in the deaths of five prisoners and three soldiers, while twenty-one detainees were wounded.
- 14 July: Al-Shabaab suicide bomber parked a car filled with explosives outside the Top Coffee Coffeehouse where people were watching the Euro 2024 final football match near Daljirka Daahsoon in Boondheere, Mogadishu. The explosion resulted in the deaths of over nine people and left 20 others injured.
- 15 July: Twelve people, including two soldiers, were killed in a fight in Shiilamadaw village near the Ethiopia–Somalia border 20 kilometers northwest of Abudwak District. The fight was between NISA soldiers from Galmudug and local militias over two truckloads of weapons illegally brought from Ethiopia.
- 22 July: The SNA repelled an attack on four army bases in Jubbaland state, killing 35–80 al-Shabaab militants.

== August ==
- 2 August: At least 37 civilians, a soldier and six attackers, including a suicide bomber, were killed after an al-Shabaab suicide bomber detonated an explosive on Lido Beach, Mogadishu. After the bombing, al-Shabaab militants stormed a hotel and carried out a mass shooting.
- 3 August: A roadside bomb exploded in Galooley, Middle Shabelle. The explosion happened on a road between Jowhar and Mogadishu. The bomb hit a civilian car, killing three people and injuring three others. The car was traveling from Jowhar to Mogadishu at the time of the attack.
- 16 August: At least 12 people were killed and nine were injured after a roadside explosion targeted a pickup truck used by security forces in Sariitow village, near Awdiinle town, west of Baidoa in South West State.
- 17 August:
  - Puntland executed 10 al-Shabaab militants in Galkayo, after a court sentenced them to Death penalty.
  - 2024 Mogadishu tea shop bombing: At least 20 people are killed and ten others are injured in a bombing at a tea shop in Daynile District in Mogadishu.
  - A bomb explosion killed at least four people and injured several others after two grenades were thrown at a khat market in the city center of Afgooye, Lower Shabelle. The attack happened as traders gathered on the busy streets.
- 21 August: Al-Shabaab claimed responsibility for a suicide car bombing that killed 10 people and injured several others, including seven NISA security officers and two civilians. The explosion occurred near a security checkpoint on the busy Mogadishu-Afgoye highway.
- 28 August: At least 9 people were killed when fighting started between SSC-Khatumo forces and Somaliland soldiers near the town of Goof, close to Erigavo in the southeastern part of the Sanaag region in northern Somalia.
- 31 August: Al-Shabaab bombs several businesses in the Tabelaha Sheikh Ibrahim neighborhood of Garas Baley, Mogadishu, targeting shops that had complied with the government's directive to install CCTV cameras.

== September ==
- 5 September: Several people were injured after six rounds of mortars fell into Aden Adde Airport and Halane Camp the residences of the ATMIS and foreign embassies.
- 14 September: At least five people were killed and eight others were injured in a series of roadside explosions in Kahda District, Mogadishu. The local government blames the al-Shabaab due to its frequent targeting of civilians.
- 18 September: SNA along with the help of local militias captured an al-Shabaab stronghold in Mudug region.
- 25 September: At least 10 al-Shabaab militants were killed in an operation by Security forces in Janaay Abdalla village near Kismayo.
- 28 September:
  - At least six people are killed and ten others are injured when a car bomb explodes outside a restaurant in Mogadishu.
  - One person was killed and three other civilians were injured after An IED bomb was planted in a livestock market in Jowhar town of Middle Shabelle region.

== October ==
- 5 October: More than 50 al-Shabaab militants were killed in an operation by SNA with the help of International coalition in El Dher District of Galguduud region.
- 13 October: Al-Shabaab has claimed responsibility for killing four businessmen in Mogadishu. The businessmen were targeted for installing closed-circuit television (CCTV) cameras, which had been mandated by the Federal government. Three of the men were killed in Daynile District, and one was killed in Yaqshid District.
- 8 October: At least 59 al-Shabaab militants and four SNA soldiers were killed in clashes in Galgaduud and Middle Shabelle regions.
- 16 October: Al-Shabaab has claimed responsibility for the killing of three businessmen and another was injured in the Hodan district of Mogadishu.
- 17 October: Al-Shabaab claims responsibility for the attack after a suicide bomber killed at least seven people at a restaurant in Hodan District of Mogadishu. Six others were injured in the attack.
- 19 October:
  - Somalia's spy agency NISA reported that they killed 40 al-Shabaab members and injured many others.
  - Amun Abdullahi 49, a Swedish-Somali journalist, was shot dead by an unidentified masked group of men who were believed to be al-Shabaab while staying at her farmhouse near Afgooye in the Lower Shabelle region. The assassins escaped after the murder.
- 26 October: An IED planted by al-Shabaab in a restaurant in Karan district, Mogadishu, kills at least five people and injures at least five others.
- 29 October: Al-Shabaab claims responsibility for the killing of six businessmen over the installation of CCTV cameras in Yaaqshiid District, Mogadishu.
- 30 October: The United Nations Security Council votes 15–0 to make changes to the United Nations Assistance Mission in Somalia, forming a new mission called the United Nations Transitional Mission in Somalia, which is expected to begin operating on 1 November 2024.

== November ==
- 2 November: At least two people are killed and five others are injured in fights between two Somali security factions in Hodan District of Mogadishu.
- 3 November: Three people are killed and several others are injured when al-Shabaab fires several mortar shells into the Halane base camp in Mogadishu.
- 7 November: Eleven Somali Army soldiers were killed in an al-Shabaab attack near Wayaanta near Kismayo in southern Somalia.
- 13 November: Three SNA soldiers have been killed and three others wounded in anShabab improvised explosive device (IED) attack on a military vehicle in Mogadishu's Daynile district.
- 18 November: Three people are killed and another is injured when a land mine, believed to have been planted by al-Shabaab, explodes on a highway between Afgooye and Wanlaweyn in Lower Shabele.
- 26 November: A deadly clash broke out between Somaliland Forces and civilians which resulted in nine deaths and many injuries in Erigavo of Sanaag region.
- 28 November: The federal government of Somalia issued a warrant of arrest for the President of Jubaland state Ahmed Mohamed Islam Madobe in a reciprocal action after Jubaland had earlier issued the same warrant for Somalia President Hassan Sheikh Mohamud.

== December ==
- 4 December: Al-Shabaab launched a suicide attack, that included a suicide vehicle-borne improvised explosive device "SVBIED" assault on two military bases outside and a person-borne IED (PBIED) outside Afgoye in Lower Shabelle.
- 11 December: Somali forces launch a failed attack on Jubaland Dervish Force, with Jubaland capturing hundreds of Somali soldiers and claiming to have fully taken over Ras Kamboni, Lower Juba.
- 23 December:
  - Violent clashes occur between the Ethiopia-backed Jubaland forces and the Somali Armed Forces in Dolow, Gedo Region, Somalia, with Jubaland forces later taking control of the town.
  - The mayor of Badhadhe District, Lower Juba, Hassan Nuur Cabdi, survives an ambush attack which killed at least five of his security personnel.
- 24 December: A US drone strike killed Mohammed mire, al-Shabaab confirms the death of Mohamed Mire Jama, a senior leader of the group, who had been designated as a terrorist by the United States, outskirt of Kunyo Baroow, Lower Shabelle in Hirshabelle State.
- 25 December: The federal government of Somalia imposes a flight ban on Jubaland, including all flights to and from Jubaland, particularly affecting the cities of Kismayo and Doolow. The flight ban was initiated amid ongoing political tensions and military engagements after Jubaland forces reportedly defeated Somali Armed Forces in several locations, including Ras Kamboni, Kulbiyow, and Dolow.
- 26 December: The United States Air Force claimed the AFRICOM drone carried out an air attack in of Lower Shabelle of southern Somalia and killed two members of the al-Shabaab which later confirmed the death of Mohamed Mire Jama a senior leader. The drone attack was undertaken in coordination with Somalia's federal government and targeted an area of Kunyo Barrow in the Southwest state.
- 27 December: Six SNA soldiers were killed in an ambush by gunmen near El Baraf.
- 29 December: At least 10 al-Shabaab commanders were killed in an Airstrike while trying to plan an attack in Lower Shabelle region.
- 31 December: Ten Islamic State militants are killed by Puntland forces in an attempted attack involving suicide bombers on a military base in Dharjaale, Bari region of Puntland. This comes after the semi-autonomous state of Puntland announced a military offensive against the Islamic State and al-Shabaab.
