= Jubaland crisis =

Ongoing conflict in Somalia

- Part of the Somali Civil War and constitutional crisis in Somalia
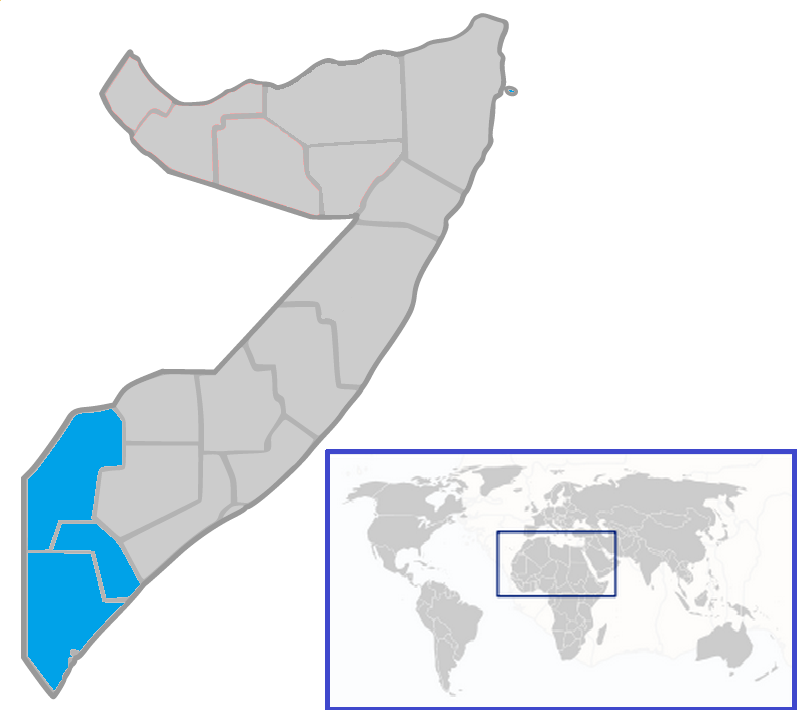
- Location of Jubaland
Date	11 December 2024 – present (1 year, 10 months, 2 weeks and 6 days)
Location	Jubaland regions of Gedo, Lower Juba and Middle Juba, Somalia
Status	Ongoing
Territorial changes	Jubaland retains control of Ras Kamboni; Ahmed Madobe remains in power; Significant Jubaland regional forces defections to SNA.; An estimated 600 Somali Armed Forces soldiers retreated into Kenya and were hosted at a Kenya Defense Forces military base before being disarmed.; Over 250 reportedly Somali Armed Forces soldiers surrender to the Jubaland Dervish Force; Unspecified casualties were reported on both sides

Belligerents
Jubaland	Somalia

Commanders and leaders
(Jubaland) Ahmed Madobe; (Jubaland) Mohamud Sayid Aden; (Jubaland) Adan Ahmed Haji	(Somalia) Hassan Sheikh Mohamud; (Somalia) Hamza Abdi Barre; Abdulkadir Mohamed Nur

Units involved
Jubaland Dervish Force; Birjeex; Hanqadh; Abris; Jubaland presidential guard; Supported by: Ethiopian National Defense Force	Somali Armed Forces; Somali National Army; Gor Gor Brigade; Gorgor; Haramacad; Villa Somalia guard unit; Koofiyad Cas

The Jubaland crisis is an ongoing armed conflict in southern Somalia, stemming from a constitutional dispute between the Somali Federal Government (led by President, Hassan Sheikh Mohamud and Prime Minister, Hamza Abdi Barre) and the semi-autonomous state of Jubaland, following Ahmed Madobe's re-election to serve for a third term as Jubaland's president.

== Background ==
Provisional Constitution of the Federal Republic of Somalia, adopted in 2012, established a federal system of government consisting of two levels: the Federal Government of Somalia (FGS) and the semi-autonomous Federal Member States (FMS). The provisional constitution sought to prevent the reemergence of an authoritarian central government, such as that under former President Siad Barre, and to address historical grievances by devolving powers to member states. The provisions delineating the Somali federal system are limited, and the federal government must negotiate with member states over its role and authority.

The ambiguity has led to competing interpretations of federal governance. Some state governments favor greater autonomy, even asserting control of powers designated for the FGS, while others support a stronger central government. These disagreements have contributed to recurring tensions between the federal and state governments over the past two decades.

A constitutional crisis began on 30 March 2024, when the Federal Parliament of Somalia approved a series of constitutional amendments aimed at establishing a more "stable political system". These changes included a return to universal suffrage, replacing the decades old clan-based electoral system, and granting the president authority to appoint the prime minister without requiring parliamentary approval. Critics argued that the reforms significantly expanded executive power. In response, the semi-autonomous state of Puntland announced the following day that it was withdrawing its recognition and confidence in the Federal Government of Somalia. It called for a "mutually accepted Somali constitution that is subject to a public referendum" and declared that, until such a constitution is in place, it would operate independently.

In October, the National Consultative Council (NCC) convened federal and state officials to discuss democratisation and security. During the meeting, the federal government reaffirmed its commitment to advancing electoral reforms, but proposed a one-year extension of the terms of all state presidents until the universal suffrage system could be implemented.

The leaders of Hirshabelle, Galmudug, and South West states accepted the proposal, but Jubaland President Ahmed Mohamed Islam, also known as Ahmed Madobe, rejected it. Negotiations on the reform continued in Kenya in early November, as Jubaland officials insisted on complete independence from the federal government in election administration. In any case, negotiations were overtaken by the expiration of Madobe's term of office.

== Controversial election ==
Defying the federal government, Jubaland amended its own constitution to override the federal two-term limit. It also extended presidential terms from four to five years. Local authorities prepared for a presidential election on 25 November 2024, while rival candidates backed by the federal government announced a parallel election.

On 23 November, the conflict turned violent in Kismayo, Jubaland's capital. A gunfight between Jubaland police and the federal candidates' security guards killed one security officer and injured two others.

On 25 November, Madobe won a third term.

== Post-election violence ==
Approximate map of the current phase of the Somali Civil War (Updated June 2025) Somalia: Under control of the Federal Government of Somalia, the African Union Support and Stabilization Mission in Somalia, and the United States Under Control of Puntland Under Control of Jubaland Jihadist insurgent groups: Under presence/control of al-Qaeda-backed al-Shabaab and allies Under control of Islamic State-backed Somalia Wilayah Somaliland: Under control of the self-declared state of Somaliland (For a more detailed map of the current military situation, see here.)

Two days after the election, the Banadir Regional Court in Mogadishu issued an arrest warrant for Madobe, accusing him of treason, violating the constitutional framework, leaking classified information to foreign actors, and undermining national unity. The following day, Jubaland state suspended relations and cooperation with the federal government. A court in Kismayo announced a $100,000 reward for the arrest of Somali President Hassan Sheikh Mohamud, accusing him of treason, undermining national unity, and conspiring with Al-Shabaab.

A month later, large-scale violence began. On 23 December, Jubaland forces and their Ethiopian backers defeated the Somali Armed Forces in a battle for control of Dolow, Gedo region. Other defeats occurred at Ras Kamboni and Kulbiyow. The same day, Hassan Nuur Cabdi, the mayor of Badhadhe District, Lower Juba, survived an ambush attack which killed at least five of his security personnel. The federal government retaliated with a flight ban on Jubaland, particularly affecting the cities of Kismayo and Doolow. They also halted work on local economic development projects.

The Jubaland State Cabinet later accused Somalia’s federal government of weaponizing international humanitarian aid. The Somali federal government had earlier announced the delivery of 700 tons of food aid from the United Arab Emirates, They said Jubaland received 300 tons, and Puntland received 200 tons. However, both Jubaland and Puntland denied receiving the aid.

On 4-5 February, Jubaland forces regained control of Bardhere District, Gedo region. Federal forces reportedly withdrew after units stationed at headquarters for several months disbanded. The battle also killed Mohamed Ilyas Caagane, the federal government's appointed commissioner for Bardhere District.

On 2 July, heavy fighting between Jubaland forces and the Somali National Army killed at least ten people in Beled Hawo, near the Somalia–Kenya border. Both sides claimed victory: Jubaland forces claimed to have taken over the district headquarters and the entire city, while the FGS claimed that its troops had successfully repelled the attack. In August, federal forces launched an offensive around the village of Tuulo Aamin against Jubbaland fighters who had assembled nearby. Residents reported sustained gunfire and explosions during the engagement, which involved the use of both heavy and light weapons. The fighting occurred shortly after federal troops solidified their hold on the Balad Hawo district. No casualty figures or official statements were released by either side.
