= Battle of Ras Kamboni (2024) =

2024 battle between SNA and Jubaland forces

- Part of Jubaland crisis and Constitutional crisis in Somalia
Date	11 December 2024
Location	Ras Kamboni, Somalia
Result	Jubaland victory; Ahmed Madobe remains in power; Significant Jubaland regional forces defections to SNA; An estimated 600 Somali Armed Forces soldiers retreated into Kenya and were hosted at a Kenya Defense Forces military base before being disarmed; Jubaland claims unverified surrender of 250 federal troops; Unspecified casualties were reported on both sides
Territorial changes	Jubaland retains control of Ras Kamboni

Belligerents
Jubaland	Somalia

Commanders and leaders
(Jubaland) Ahmed Madobe; Adan Ahmed Haji	(Somalia) Hassan Sheikh Mohamud; Hassan Iraqi (surrendered)

Units involved
Jubaland Dervish Force; Birjeex; Hanqadh; Abris; Jubaland Presidential Unit	Somali Armed Forces; Somali National Army; Gorgor

Ras Kamboni battle was the first battle of Jubaland crisis after Somali forces reportedly launched an attack that was repelled on Jubaland regional forces in the Marnani area near Ras Kamboni on 11 December 2024. Prior to the battle, the federal government had deployed Somali troops from Mogadishu, Banadir region to Lower Juba region in an attempt to remove President Ahmed Madobe from power. At the end of the battle, Jubaland claimed to have captured hundreds of Somali soldiers and took back Ras Kamboni, Lower Juba.

Federal forces were reportedly repelled by Jubaland forces, leading to a withdrawal from the area.

Following the defeat by Jubaland forces, Kenya plans to allow 600 disarmed Somali National Army soldiers to return to Mogadishu who crossed the ishiakani border in Lamu County. Over 250 Somali Armed Forces soldiers surrender to the Jubaland Dervish Force. Survivors and wounded fighters returned to Mogadishu, and eventually Jubaland regained Ras Kamboni control.

== Background ==
A constitutional crisis took shape in Somalia when the Somali President, Hassan Sheikh Mohamud, changed the Constitution of Somalia on March 30, 2024. The change was opposed by the President of Puntland Said Abdullahi Deni. As a result, Puntland withdrew its recognition of the Federal Government of Somalia and declared itself an independent state citing Article 4 of the Puntland Constitution.

On March 31, 2024, Puntland announced its withdrawal from the federal system, Puntland cabinets in their emergency meeting stated their intention to govern independently until constitutional amendments proposed by the central government are ratified through a nationwide referendum.

=== Jubaland election ===
On 3 November, Jubaland invited their Members of Federal Parliament from the state to come to Kismayo for discussions, after rising tensions between Jubaland and the federal government, and the resignations of the State Minister of Planning, Abdirashid Jire and a deputy minister in the Ministry of Education, the following day Jubaland cut ties to Federal Government of Somalia.

2024 Jubaland presidential election were held in Jubaland on 25 November. The incumbent president Ahmed Mohamed Islam was re-elected by members of the House of Representatives as the President of Jubaland for a third term. It was the third election since the state's formation in 2012. Prior to the elections, the Parliament Speaker and other Deputy Speakers were elected on 21 November, by the House of Representatives of Jubaland amid tensions with the federal government that resulted in Somali National Army being deployed to Kamboni, Badhadhe District in Lower Juba region.

On November 27, 2024, The Banadir Regional Court in Mogadishu, Somalia, issues an arrest warrant for Jubaland President Ahmed Madobe, accusing Madobe of treason and violating the constitution. In response, the regional court in Kismayo, Jubaland, announces a $100,000 reward for the arrest of Somali President Hassan Sheikh Mohamud, accusing Hassan of treason, undermining national unity, and conspiring with Al-Shabaab militia.

== Clash ==
On December 11, 2024, heavy fighting broke out early in the morning between Jubaland Dervish forces and (Somali: Gor-Gor) of Somali National Army in Manaraani, north of Ras Kamboni.

The dawn battle erupted over vital Oodow Well, the only water source for Ras Kamboni, located 6 kilometers from the town. Gor-Gor reportedly launched the attack, fearing Jubaland Dervish forces had positioned themselves in Burgabo, near Ras Kamboni.

== Timeline ==
- On 4 November, a delegation of mediators from Kenya was led by the former IGAD Executive Secretary, Mahboub Maalim, the former IGAD Special Representative for Somalia, Mohamed Abdi Affey, and the former senator for Wajir County, Abdirahman Ali Hassan arrived in Kismayo to meet president Ahmed Madobe, after President of Somalia, Hassan Sheikh Mohamud, requested from the Kenyan government to work towards finding a solution to the tension between Jubaland and Federal Government of Somalia.
- On 18 November, Somali Prime Minister Hamza Abdi Barre said Ahmed Madobe could not run for office again because his term had ended. Abdifatah Mohamed Mukhtar, the Jubaland Minister of Information, disagreed. He told BBC Somali, "The Prime Minister should remember that he once said Jubaland had its own independent elections. Now he is saying those elections are not valid."
- On 19 November, Mursal Siad Mohamed, the chairman of the Jubaland Electoral Commission, chaired a meeting with the traditional elders of Jubaland's tribes as they submitted the list of new members for the Third Jubaland House of Representatives. The commission also announced the new Members of Parliament and confirmed that the election for the Speaker of the Jubaland Parliament is scheduled to take place on 21 November. The Supreme Court of Jubaland takes an oath in the 75 newly Representatives MP's approved by the Traditional Leaders.
- On 21 November, Abdi Mohamed Abdirahman was re-elected as Speaker for a third term and secured 65 votes. His opponent, Ismail Abdi Keerow, got 7 votes. Hirad Ismail Mohamed was elected as the First Deputy Speaker with 56 votes, while Mahad Mohamed Ahmed received 18 votes. Abdi Baley Hussein became the Second Deputy Speaker after getting 51 votes. His opponent, Abdirashid Ali Mohamud received 22 votes.
- On 23 November at least one security officer was killed and two others were injured in a gunfight between Jubaland police and security guards in Kismayo, After rival candidates backed by the federal government announced a parallel election amid a disagreement on the electoral procedure for the presidential election.
- Jubaland authorities said they concerned about interference from Somalia's Federal Government during its elections were highlighted by the Ministry of Interior on 23 November. It accuses the Office of the Prime Minister of misusing UN and ATMIS resources for political purposes that were undermining neutrality and stability. Jubaland describes these actions as unconstitutional and calls on international partners to respect Somalia’s federal system and support fair and peaceful governance.

== Aftermath ==
=== Result ===
Jubaland's Deputy Security Minister, Adan Ahmed Haji, stated during a press conference in Kismayo that federal forces from Mogadishu used Turkish-supplied Bayraktar TB2 drones to attack Jubaland forces. He criticized the Somali government for using military resources intended to combat external threats like Al-Shabaab against Jubaland, which he described as "peaceful." Additionally, he mentioned that 42 Turkish-trained Gorgor soldiers surrendered shortly after the battle.

After six hours of intense fighting, Jubaland forces took control of Ras Kamboni and defeated Somali National Army division Gor Gor brigade. The Somali Armed Forces failed to overthrow Ahmed Madobe, and 600 soldiers cross over into Kenya and are disarmed by the Kenya Defense Forces and over 250 Somali Armed Forces soldiers surrender to the Jubaland Dervish Force. Remained Federal troops and injured soldiers redeployed to Mogadishu after Defeat.

On Thursday, Jubaland authorities confirmed the capture from the battle of Lieutenant Colonel Hassan Adan Mohamed 'Iraqi', the commander of the Gor Gor unit's 18th Battalion.

=== Local ===
- Puntland’s Interior Minister, Abdi Farah Said Juha, criticized Somali President Hassan Sheikh Mohamud and accused him of waging war against his own people. He highlighted reports of federal government drone strikes targeting Jubaland troops instead of Al-Shabaab and called for reconsidering the lifting of the arms embargo.
- Former president Sharif Sheikh Ahmed and former prime ministers Hassan Ali Khaire and Abdirahman Abdishakur Warsame raised concerns over the conflict and it to end.

=== International ===
United Kingdom: The British Embassy in Mogadishu condemned the “unacceptable loss of life” and urged all parties to resume dialogue and to establish a "pathway to reconciliation".
