= Battle of Ras Kamboni =

Battle of Ras Kamboni may refer to:

- Battle of Ras Kamboni (2007), a battle between the transitional federal government of Somalia and the Islamic Courts Union.
- Battle of Ras Kamboni (2024), a battle between the federal government of Somalia and Jubaland regional forces.
