= Jubaland Dervish Force =

State paramilitary unit in Somalia

Jubaland Darawiish Force
- Ciidanka Daraawiishta Jubbaland
- Founder: Ahmed Madobe
- Leader: Mahad Islaam
- Country: Somalia
- Allegiance: Jubaland
- Groups: Ogaden; Marehan
- Headquarters: Kismayo, Somalia
- Ideology: Federalism
- Wars: Somali Civil War: Somali Civil War (2009–present); Jubaland crisis; 2024 Battle of Ras Kamboni

The Jubaland Darawiish Force (Somali: Ciidamadda Daraawiishta Jubaland) is a paramilitary force that forms the security unit of Jubaland, an autonomous federated state in southern Somalia. The Jubaland Darawiish started operating under the administration of Ahmed Madobe. Headquartered in Kismayo, one of its primary bases is located in Afmadow. Jubaland president Madobe has said that the force aims to focus on counter-terrorism and provocative actors within the state of Jubaland. The unit is commanded by Lt. Col Mahad Islaam.

== Conflict with the Somali National Army ==
Following the 2024 Jubaland presidential election, the Somali federal government refused to recognise the newly elected president Ahmed Madobe citing the lack of universal suffrage since the election was held based on the old indirect clan system where the electorate consisted of 75 individuals from prominent clans in the region. The federal government had requested the election be delayed until 2025 when plans for universal suffrage would be implemented. Madobe ignored this request and both the federal responded by stationing more troops in the region. On November 27, 2024, a gunfight broke out in the town of Raskamboni in the Badhadhe District near the border with Kenya between the Darawiish and Somali National Army. That day, the federal government announced an arrest warrant for Darawiish leader, chairman of the Raskamboni Movement and Jubaland president Ahmed Madobe accusing him of high treason, sharing classified information with a foreign power, and undermining Somalia's constitutional framework.

== See also ==
- Puntland Security Force
- Dervish movement (Somali)
