= Somali Custodial Corps =

Somali Custodial Corps Ciidanka Asluubta Soomaaliyeed مصلحة السجون الصومالية
- Logo of the Somali Custodial Corps
- Abbreviation: CAS
- Motto: Kahortag iyo u Adeegid (English: Protect and Serve)

Agency overview
- Formed: 22 February 1970; 56 years ago

Jurisdictional structure
- National agency (Operations jurisdiction): SOM
- Operations jurisdiction: SOM
- Legal jurisdiction: Somalia
- Primary governing body: Federal Government of Somalia
- Secondary governing body: Ministry of Justice
- General nature: Military provost

Operational structure
- Headquarters: Mogadishu, Somalia
- Elected officer responsible: Hassan Moalim, Ministry of Justice
- Agency executive: Brigadier General Mahad Abdirahman Aden, Chief of Custodial Corps

Website
- moj.gov.so

The Somali Custodial Corps (Somali: Ciidanka Asluubta Soomaaliyeed; Arabic: فيلق حراسة الصومال) is the section of the Somali law enforcement in Somalia that is responsible for the maintenance and guarding of prisons and is a military provost due to the Corps investigating crimes within the Somali Armed Forces and bringing individuals before the Military Courts. Although the Custodial Corps is part of the Police, they have these powers as the Police was integrated into the military from 1960 to the turn of the 21st century. The Somali Custodial Corps were separated from the police in 1970. Since then, the government has separated the military from the Police, but the Corps still retains the same powers and responsibilities it had since 1970. Its function is quite similar to that of the Italian Arma dei Carabinieri, but the Custodial Corps fall under the Ministry of Justice. The founding commander was Ismail Ahmed Ismail.

== History ==
In 1884 the British formed an armed constabulary to police the Somaliland coast. In 1910 the British created the Somaliland Coastal Police, and in 1912 they established the Somaliland Camel Corps to police the interior.

In 1926 the colonial authorities formed the Somaliland Police Force. Commanded by British officers, the force included Somalis in its lower ranks. Armed rural constabulary supported this force by bringing offenders to court, guarding prisoners, patrolling townships, and accompanying nomadic tribesmen over grazing areas.

In 1960, the British Somaliland Somaliland Scouts joined with the (Police Corps of Somalia) (1910–1960) to form a new Somali Custodial Corps, which consisted of about a few hundred men. The authorities also organized approximately 1,000 of the force as the Daraawishta Booliska, a mobile group used to keep peace between warring clans in the interior.

In 1970, the then military government created the Somali Custodial Corps as a separate entity from the existing police structures. As the Police Force acted as a civil police force, the Custodial Corps fulfilled roles that would be more in-line with military police forces. The government considered the Custodial Corps a part of the armed forces until 1991, after which the Asluubta would be put under the Ministry of Justice instead of the Armed Forces.

== Mission and Duties ==
- Operating Prisons
- Transferring suspects
- Conducting investigations of military crimes
- Policing the Armed Forces
- Public Safety

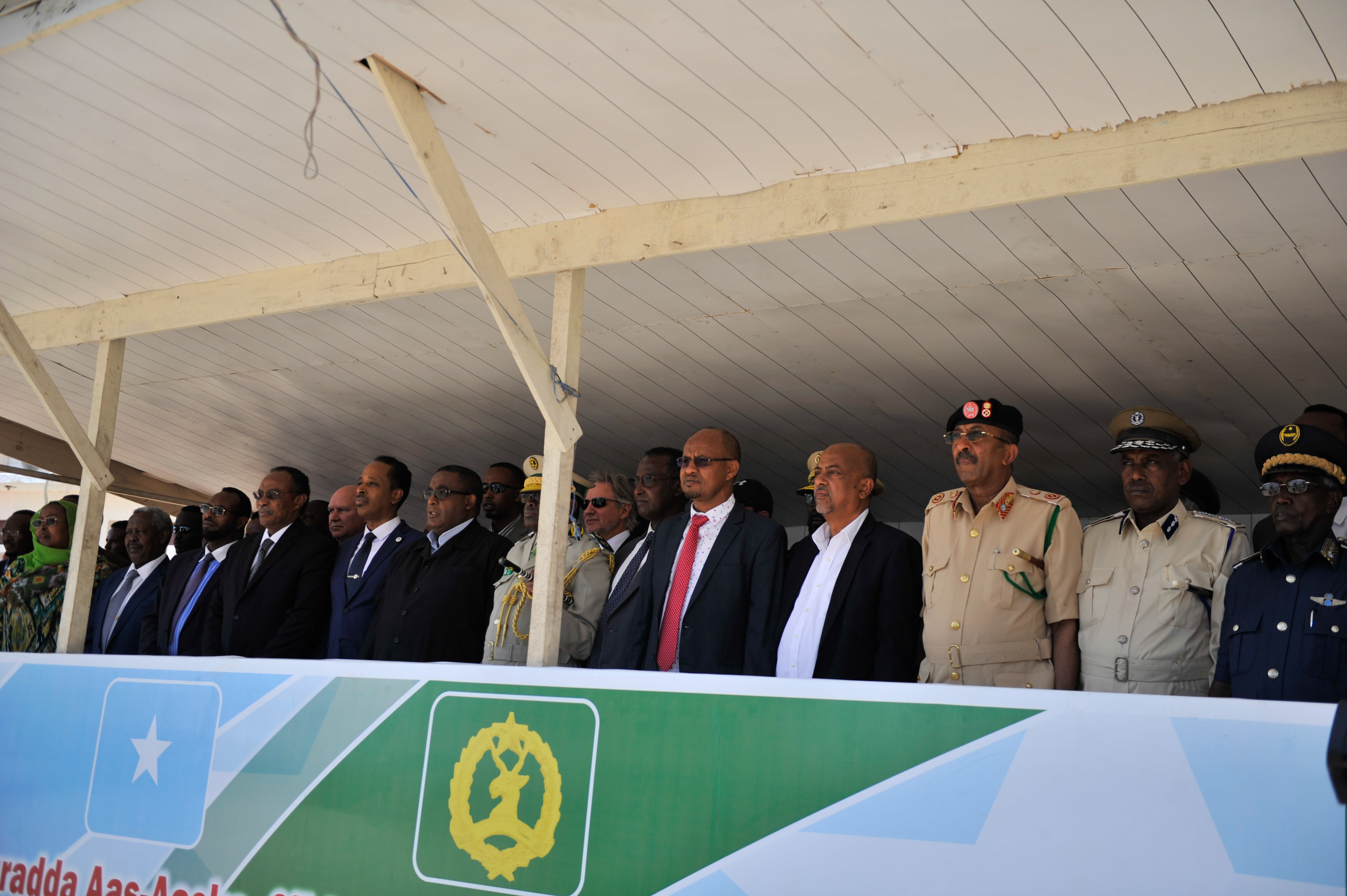
Senior political and military officials at the opening of a new prison, 2016.

== Equipment ==
The Corps's uniform appears more similar to that of the military due to its khaki colour, but the Corps uses green berets, ties and accent on rank insignia (the Army uses red accents), the Corps also utilises dark green fatigues in the south of the country, the Corps's inventory is similar to that of the military due to the embargo preventing the government from obtaining more arms.

	Origin	Type	Notes
TT pistol	Soviet Union	Pistol	
Makarov pistol	Soviet Union	Pistol	
Sterling submachine gun	United Kingdom	Submachine gun	
AK-47	Soviet Union	Assault Rifle	
AKM	Soviet Union	Assault Rifle	
AK74	Soviet Union	Assault Rifle	
vz. 58	Czech Republic	Assault Rifle	

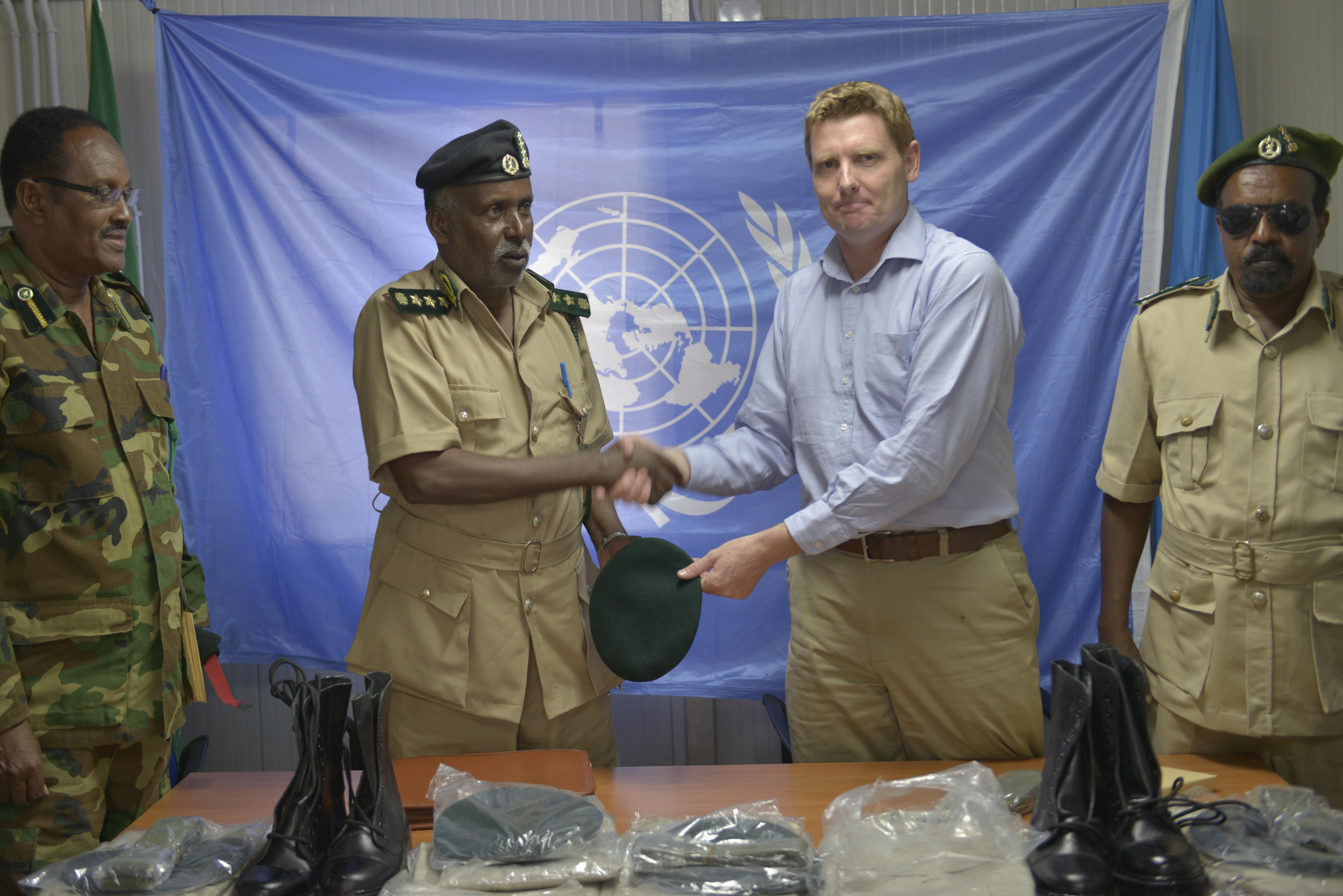
Senior Custodial Corps officers in 2014
