= Top Coffee bombing =

2024 suicide car bomb and explosion in Mogadishu, Somalia

- Part of Somali Civil War and Somali civil war (2009–present)
- Location: Bondhere District, Mogadishu
- Date: 14 July 2024; 2 years ago 10:28 pm (UTC+3)
- Target: Top Coffee (Coffeehouse)
- Attack type: suicide bombing
- Deaths: 10, including the bomber
- Injuries: 20
- Perpetrator: Al-Shabaab
- Motive: Terrorism in Somalia; Anti-imperialism; Westernophobia

On 14 July 2024, a car bomb exploded near Daljirka Daahsoon in Boondheere, Mogadishu. The explosion happened at 10:28 p.m. local time. The target was Top Coffee, a coffeehouse where people were watching the Euro 2024 final football match between England and Spain.

A suicide bomber had parked a car filled with explosives outside the café. The explosion killed more than nine people and injured 20 others. Al-Shabaab was responsible for the attack.

== Background ==
Al-Shabaab is a militant group that has attacked public places where people watch football matches.

On 11 July 2010, they bombed two places in Kampala, Uganda, during the World Cup final match. These explosions killed 74 people and injured 85 others.

On 15 June 2014, they attacked the town of Mpeketoni in Kenya. Many people were watching World Cup matches in public places. These attacks resulted in the deaths of at least 60 people.

=== Target ===
Top Coffee, located near Daljirka Daahsoon in the Boondheere neighborhood, is less than 500 meters from Villa Somalia. On the night of the Euro 2024 final football match between England and Spain, many people gathered at the cafe to watch the game.

== Attack ==
A suicide bomber from Al-Shabaab parked a car loaded with explosives outside the café. The car bomb detonated at 10:28 p.m. local time. Most of the victims were people on the street and spectators watching the football match.

== Aftermath ==
The explosion killed more than nine people and injured 20 others. Al-Shabaab claimed responsibility for the attack.

=== Reactions ===
- Former President of Somalia, Sharif Sheikh Ahmed tweeted;

Sharif Sheikh Ahmed
(@HESharifShAhmed)
tweeted:

I strongly condemn the heinous attack on the young people who were watching games at the Top Coffee in Mogadishu tonight.

July 15, 2024

- Former Somali Minister of Planning and International Cooperation, Abdirahman Abdishakur Warsame posted picture on X and said;

Abdirahman Abdishakur
(@AAbdishakur)
tweeted:

May God have mercy on the people who lost their lives tonight in the explosion carried out by AS terrorists at the Top Coffee restaurant while they were watching the final game of the European Cup. The pictures shown here depict how AS terrorists are enemies of peace and our way of life. We must unite against this ruthless enemy that poses a threat to both the state and its people.

July 14, 2024
