= 2024 Jubaland presidential election =

Somalian state election

- 25 November 2024

75 MPs 38 votes needed to win
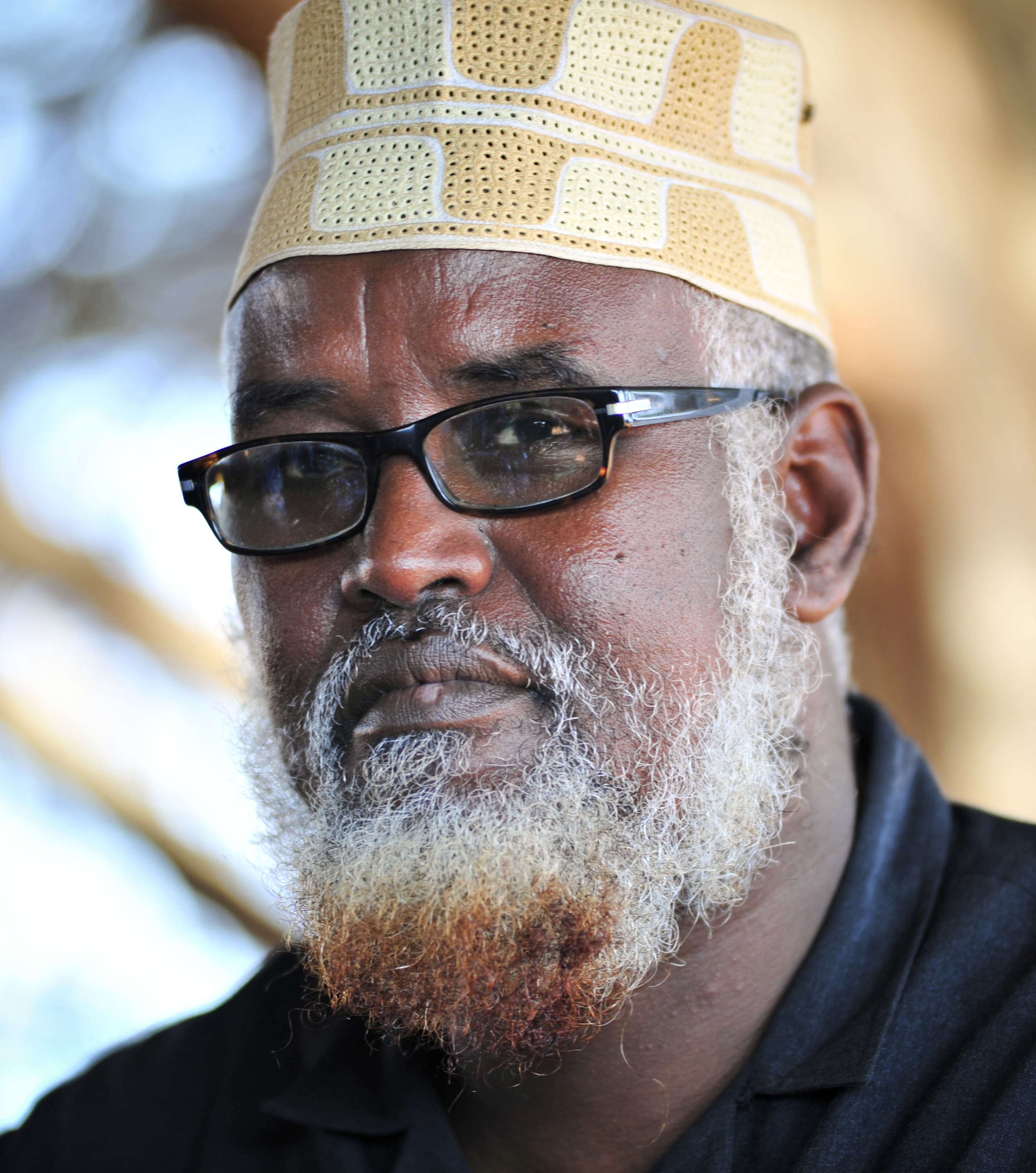
Candidate	Ahmed Mohamed Islam	Abubakar Omar Ali
Electoral vote	55	16
President before election
Ahmed Mohamed Islam
Elected President
Ahmed Mohamed Islam

Indirect presidential elections were held in Jubaland, Somalia, on 25 November 2024. The incumbent president Ahmed Mohamed Islam was re-elected by members of the House of Representatives as the President of Jubaland for a third term. It was the third election since the state's formation in 2012. Prior to the elections, the Parliament Speaker and other Deputy Speakers were elected on 21 November, by the House of Representatives of Jubaland.

== Background ==
On 31 March, Puntland withdrew its recognition of the federal government due to a constitutional crisis caused by the federal parliament's adoption of changes to a disputed provisional constitution without consulting Puntland, under which the president and government were originally elected.

On 3 November, Jubaland invited their Members of Federal Parliament from the state to come to Kismayo for discussions, after rising tensions between Jubaland and the federal government, and the resignations of the State Minister of Planning, Abdirashid Jire and a deputy minister in the Ministry of Education, the following day Jubaland cut ties to Federal Government of Somalia.

=== Formation of Jubaland Electoral Commission for Presidential Election ===
On 8 November, Jubaland's President Ahmed Madobe announced the creation of a new electoral commission to prepare for the regional presidential election.

The seven-member commission will oversee the election process. In a letter dated 9 November, President Madobe referred to the Jubaland constitution, which gives the regional state the right to create its own electoral body and hold elections without interference from the Somali federal government.

The letter pointed out Jubaland's commitment to protecting its autonomy despite pressure from the federal government. Jubaland started an independent election process, resisting attempts to use a federally appointed commission after Madobe opposed a proposed one-year extension of his term.

== Candidates ==
- Ahmed Mohamed Islam, incumbent president
- Mohamed Abdullahi Salad, former Somali minister of ports.
- Abdi Ali Rage, former minister

== Reactions ==
=== Jubaland House of Representatives Welcomed by Somali Leaders ===
Sharif Sheikh Ahmed, the former president of Somalia and leader of the Himilo Qaran party, has welcomed the newly elected Jubaland House of Representatives. In a press release, his party stated that the legislative and executive branches of Somalia's federal member states should be governed by their own regional constitutions, as outlined in Article 120 of the Provisional Federal Charter. He urged Somalia's federal leaders to respect the country's Constitution.

Former prime minister Hassan Ali Khaire also congratulated the new members of Jubaland’s parliament. On X, he called on them to perform their duties efficiently, improve Jubaland's laws and institutions, and focus on public interests, peace, and unity within the state.

Puntland Parliament, the 6th Puntland House of Representatives announced their willingness to collaborate with the new members of Jubaland’s parliament.

== Results ==
The incumbent president Ahmed Mohamed Islam re-elected by members of the House of Representatives as the President of Jubaland for a third term as he was winning 55 out of 75 votes cast by the Jubaland. For second place, Abubakar Omar Ali received 16 votes, while Faysal Mukhtar got 4 votes.

Candidate	Votes	%
Ahmed Mohamed Islam	55	73.33
Abubakar Omar Ali	16	21.33
Faysal Mukhtar	4	5.33
Total	75	100.00
Source: Horseed, Idil News Garowe Online

== Incidents ==
- On 4 November, a delegation of mediators from Kenya was led by the former IGAD Executive Secretary, Mahboub Maalim, the former IGAD Special Representative for Somalia, Mohamed Abdi Affey, and the former senator for Wajir County, Abdirahman Ali Hassan arrived in Kismayo to meet president Ahmed Madobe, after President of Somalia, Hassan Sheikh Mohamud, requested from the Kenyan government to work towards finding a solution to the tension between Jubaland and Federal Government of Somalia.
- On 18 November, Somali Prime Minister Hamza Abdi Barre said Ahmed Madobe could not run for office again because his term had ended. Abdifatah Mohamed Mukhtar, the Jubaland Minister of Information, disagreed. He told BBC Somali, "The Prime Minister should remember that he once said Jubaland had its own independent elections. Now he is saying those elections are not valid."
- On 19 November, Mursal Siad Mohamed, the chairman of the Jubaland Electoral Commission, chaired a meeting with the traditional elders of Jubaland's tribes as they submitted the list of new members for the Third Jubaland House of Representatives. The commission also announced the new Members of Parliament and confirmed that the election for the Speaker of the Jubaland Parliament is scheduled to take place on 21 November. The Supreme Court of Jubaland takes an oath in the 75 newly Representatives MP's approved by the Traditional Leaders.
- On 21 November, Abdi Mohamed Abdirahman was re-elected as Speaker for a third term and secured 65 votes. His opponent, Ismail Abdi Keerow, got 7 votes. Hirad Ismail Mohamed was elected as the First Deputy Speaker with 56 votes, while Mahad Mohamed Ahmed received 18 votes. Abdi Baley Hussein became the Second Deputy Speaker after getting 51 votes. His opponent, Abdirashid Ali Mohamud received 22 votes.
- On 23 November at least one security officer was killed and two others were injured in a gunfight between Jubaland police and security guards in Kismayo, After rival candidates backed by the federal government announced a parallel election amid a disagreement on the electoral procedure for the presidential election.
- Concerns about interference from Somalia's Federal Government during its elections were highlighted by the Ministry of Interior on 23 November. It accuses the Office of the Prime Minister of misusing UN and ATMIS resources for political purposes that were undermining neutrality and stability. Jubaland describes these actions as unconstitutional and calls on international partners to respect Somalia’s federal system and support fair and peaceful governance.
