= 2024 Mogadishu prison attack =

2024 prison attack in Mogadishu, Somalia

2024 Mogadishu prison escape attempt
- Part of Somali Civil War and Somali civil war (2009–present)
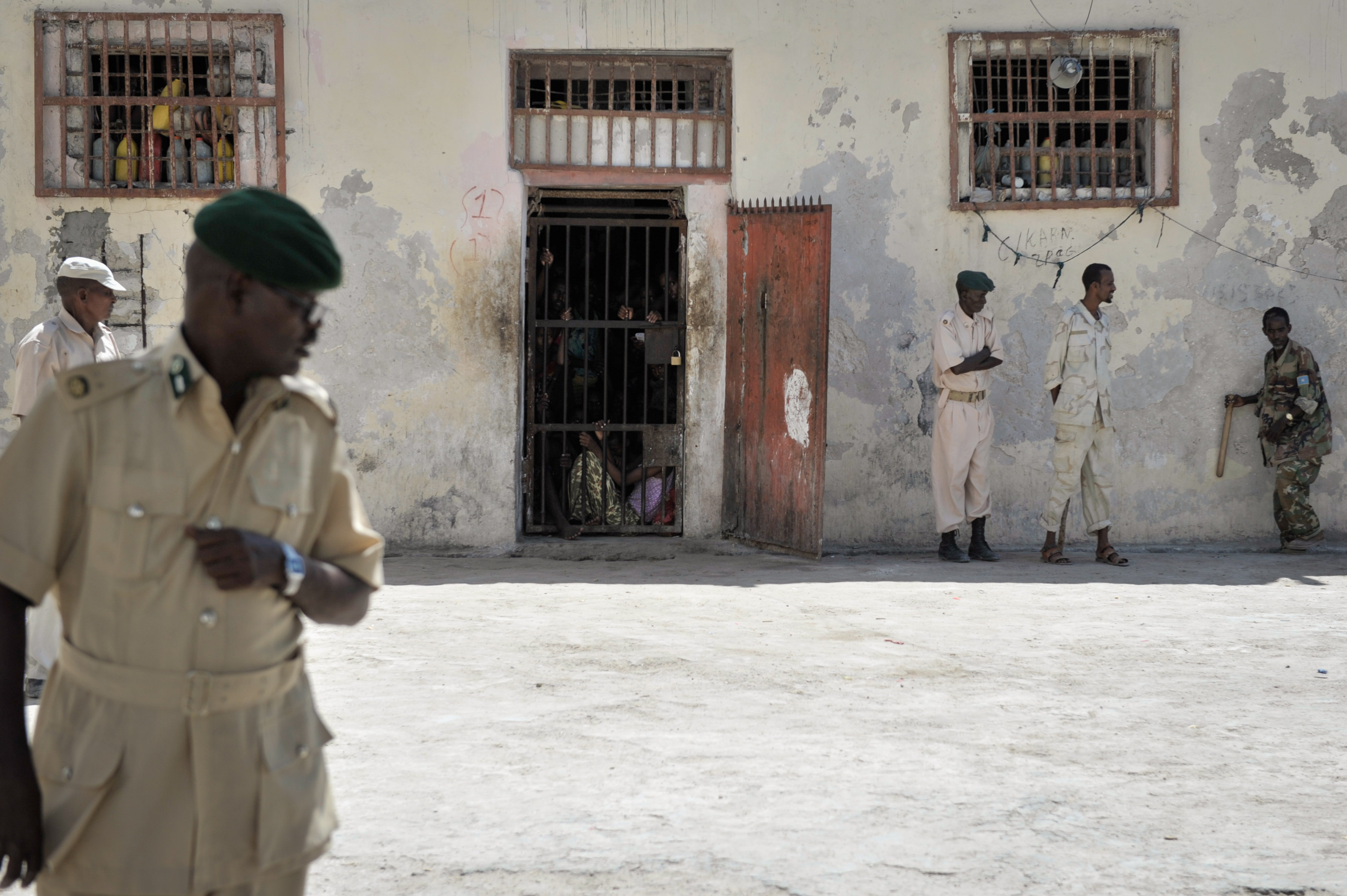
- Mogadishu Central Prison (2013)
Date	13 July 2024; 2 years ago 09:00 am (EAT)
Location	Mogadishu Central Prison 2°2′25″N 45°21′49″E
Result	Escape attempt foiled (claimed by the Federal Government of Somalia; Al-Shabaab claimed 500 inmates were freed). See § Result.

Belligerents
Al-Shabaab	Federal Government of Somalia

Commanders and leaders
Unknown	Brigadier General Dahir Abdulle Rageh

Units involved
Unknown	Somali Armed Forces: Somali Custodial Corps

Casualties and losses
Unknown	3 soldiers killed
- 5 prisoners killed and twenty-one wounded

On July 13, 2024, several armed Al-Shabaab inmates serving death penalties and life sentences at Mogadishu Central Prison in Somalia attempted an escape, leading to a fierce shootout with Somali Custodial Corps soldiers serving as prison guards.

The confrontation resulted in the deaths of five prisoners and three soldiers, with twenty-one prisoners injured. The Federal Government of Somalia said the escape attempt had been foiled, while Al-Shabaab claimed to have successfully freed 500 prisoners.

== Background ==
Al-Shabab has been fighting the Federal Government of Somalia for more than 17 years. They have carried out many bombings and other attacks in the capital, Mogadishu, and other parts of Somalia. In 2020, there was an attempted jailbreak at this same prison, resulting in the deaths of nine people as inmates clashed with security guards while trying to escape.

== Attack ==
On Thursday 13 June 2024, around 9 am (EAT) residents of Mogadishu heard gunfire and explosions. The confrontation happened at the Mogadishu Central Prison when armed inmates tried to escape. The inmates, who were members of Al-Shabaab had been sentenced to death and to life imprisonment, used small arms and hand grenades and exchanged fire with the prison guards.

== Aftermath ==
=== Result ===
The attempted jailbreak involved prisoners who were confirmed members of al-Shabaab. They had been convicted of serious crimes and were trying to break out of prison. The situation was eventually controlled by the prison guards.

=== Investigation ===
Brigadier General Dahir Abdulle Rageh, the prison chief, has been suspended while an investigation takes place.

General Mahad Abdirahmana Aden, the commander of Somali Custodial Corps, dismissed Brigadier General Rageh. General Mohamed Hussein Ahmed has been appointed as the acting commander of the central prison and will lead an eight-member committee to investigate the incident.

The incident resulted in the deaths of five prisoners and three soldiers, and twenty-one detainees were wounded during the escape attempt. The Federal Government claimed they foiled the escape attempt. A spokesperson for the Somali custodial corps said, "No prisoners escaped. The situation is under control, and we are conducting a national investigation."

Universal TV interviewed the sister of one of the victims. She questioned, "How did Al-Shabab easily obtain guns and grenades inside Mogadishu Central Prison, while the security guard has three security checkpoints for inspecting us? They even check tiny fish cans. We seek justice for those killed in the incident."

=== Al-Shabab ===
Al-Shabab claimed they freed 500 prisoners during the attempted jailbreak.
