= Mahboub Maalim =

Kenyan diplomat

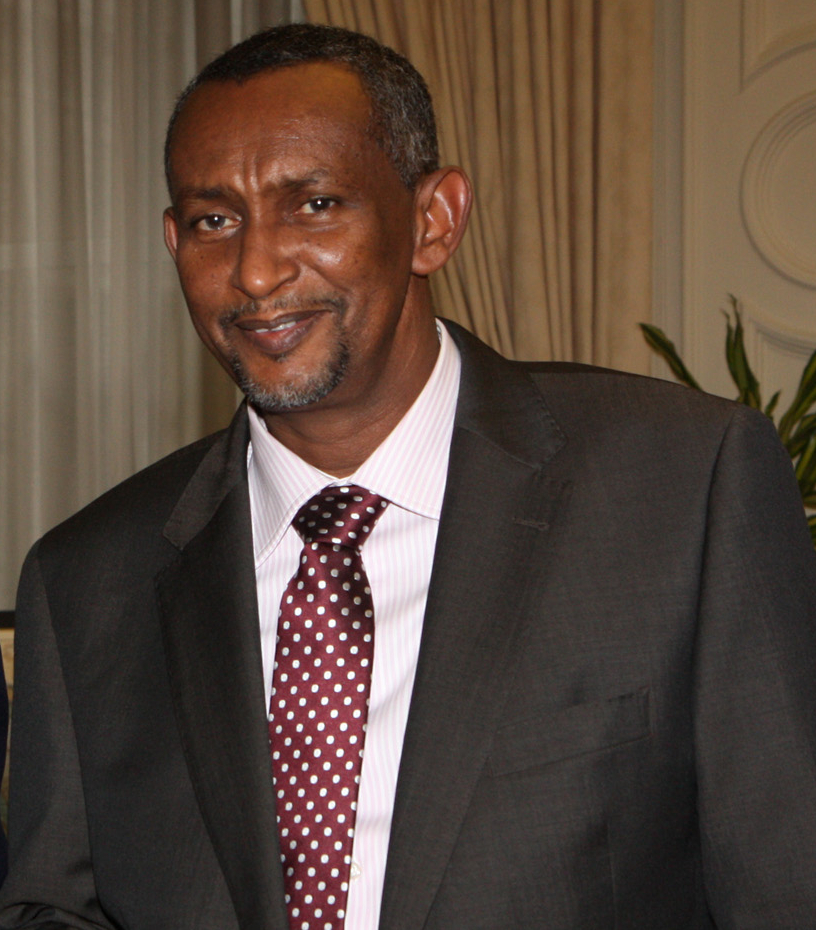

Mahboub Maalim (Somali: Maxbuub Macalin, Arabic: محبوب معلم; born 1958) is a Kenyan diplomat. He was the executive secretary of the Intergovernmental Authority on Development (2008-2019). He was appointed by the 12th Summit of IGAD Heads of State and Government that was held on 14 June 2008 in Addis Ababa, Ethiopia. He was reappointed for a second term on 11 July 2012.

A civil engineer by profession and a veteran rural development expert, he previously served as Permanent Secretary of the Ministry of Water and Irrigation in Kenya. He had also served as Permanent Secretary of the Ministry of State for Special Programs in the Office of the President.

== IGAD Executive Secretary (2008 - 2019) ==
Maalim's appointment came at a time when IGAD was gaining visibility as a lead Regional Economic Community (REC) on peace, security and development agenda. IGAD was granted an observer status in the UN General Assembly in 2011 and subsequently at the World Trade Organisation's Committee for Technical Barriers to Trade (TBT) in 2015.

In 2012, he led the launch of the IGAD Drought Resilience and Sustainability Initiative (IDDRSI) which provides a regional platform for a coordinated response to drought and other national emergencies with an emphasis on improving resilience of citizens inhabiting the region's vast arid and semi arid areas. IDDRSI encapsulates IGAD's earlier mission of combating drought and food insecurity when it was initially founded as the Intergovernmental Authority on Drought and Development (IGADD) in 1986.

From 2013 to 2015, he oversaw the IGAD Mediation process for South Sudan that culminated with the signing of the Agreement on the Resolution of the Conflict in South Sudan (ARCSS) in August 2015. However, the mediation process and subsequent efforts of IGAD alongside the African Union, UN and global partners are yet to achieve lasting peace in South Sudan.

Following years of IGAD's involvement in stabilization efforts in Somalia, Maalim also led the establishment of a Special Envoy's office to Somalia in 2017.

IGAD has gone through a noticeable institutional expansion during Maalim's tenure with the establishment of numerous IGAD specialized institutions including:

- IGAD Security Sector Program (ISSP), set up on 6 October 2011 to support IGAD Member State security institutions to combat terrorism, transnational organized crime and regional maritime security concerns;
- IGAD Center for Pastoral Areas and Livestock Development (ICPALD), set up in 2015 as a dedicated center for regional livestock and pastoral development;
- IGAD Centre of Excellence for Preventing and Countering Violent Extremism (ICEPCVE), set up in 2018 to combat concerns related to rising violent extremism in the region; and
- IGAD Sheikh Technical Veterinary School (ISTVS), adopted as an IGAD Specialized agency in 2011. It was formerly under the African Union Inter-African Bureau for Animal Resources (AU IBAR).

== Education and career ==
Mahboub Maalim is a registered Civil Engineer with the Kenya Engineers’ Board and a member of the Institute of Engineers of Kenya (IEK). He earned a BSc. in Civil Engineering from the Texas Agricultural and Mechanical University College, Texas and subsequently an MSc in Civil Engineering in 1992 from the same university.

His early career included serving as an inspector and district water engineer with Ministry of Water and Irrigation. Between 1994 and 1996, he coordinated several multi-national projects under the office of the President, including the World Bank Financed Drought Recovery Project in the Arid Lands of Kenya.

He is a recipient of a number of awards and honours including the Order of Grand Warrior of Kenya (OGW) and Chief of Burning Spear of Kenya (CBS).

Maalim was appointed as Chairman of the Board of Directors of Kenya Power in on 9 January 2018.

In November 2019 he was replaced as executive director by Workneh Gebeyehu.

He is fluent in English, Kswahili and Somali.
