= Murder of Luul Abdiaziz Mohamed =

Somali civil servant (1994–2024)

Luul Sheikh Abdiaziz
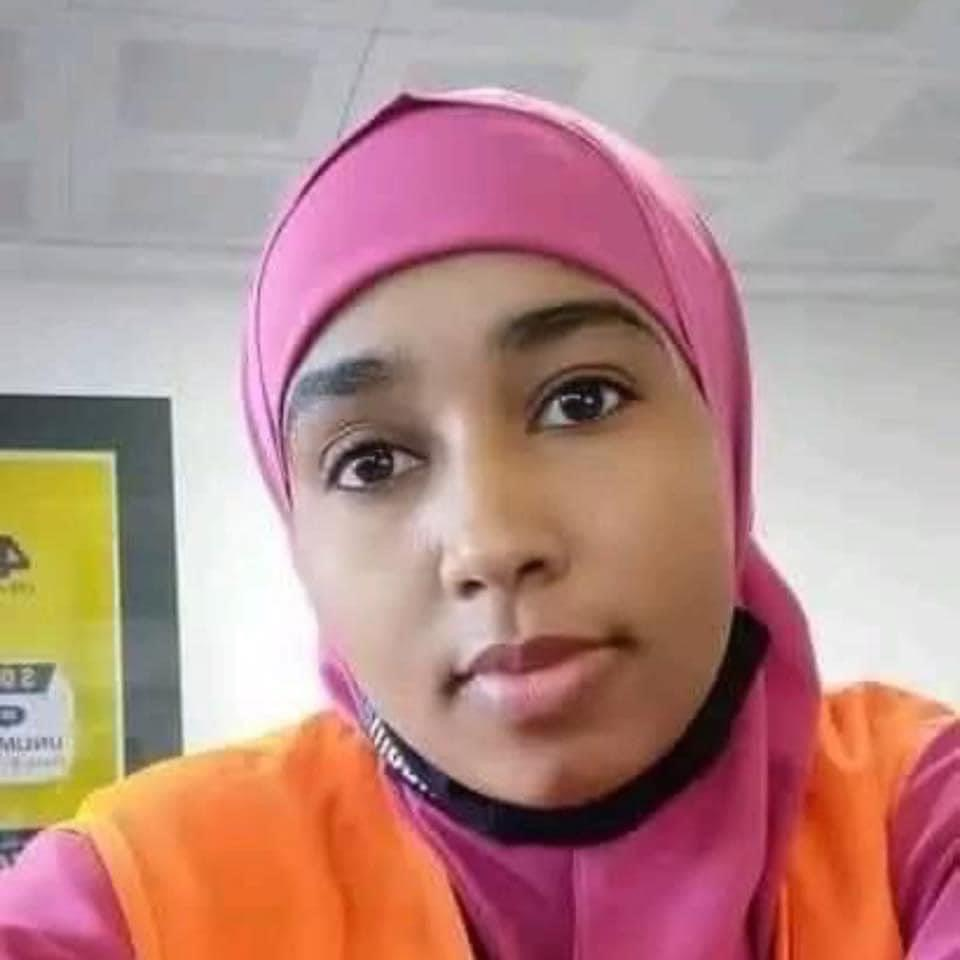
- Luul Sheikh Abdiaziz
- Born: 19 May 1994; Somalia
- Died: 26 January 2024 (aged 29); Dharkiinley district, Mogadishu, Somalia
- Cause of death: Burned
- Occupation: Civil servant

Luul Abdiaziz Mohamed (Somali: Luul Cabdicasiis Maxamed, Arabic: لول عبد العزيز محمد) also known as Luul Sheikh Abdiaziz, was a Somali civil servant working at Mogadishu's airport and the mother of six children, who was set on fire by her husband on the night of 26 January 2024 in Dharkiinley district, Mogadishu. Luul was pregnant and she died from her severe wounds at Digfeer hospital on 2 February 2024. Her family refused to bury until justice is served for the slain mother, the corpse was kept in mortuary refrigerator at Digfeer hospital for 36 days. On 8 March 2024 Luul was buried in Aljazeera village on the outskirts of Mogadishu.

== Death and aftermath ==
The suspect Sayid Ali Ma'alin escaped from the scene and travelled to the Galgaduud region two days later. The police declared him wanted for burning a citizen. On 5 February he was captured and airlifted to Mogadishu. After two court hearings, on 6 March 2024, Banadir regional court sentenced him to capital punishment. The case was closely monitored by the general public and the decision was widely welcomed.

Following the court's verdict, the Luul family announced that the corpse will be buried.

Speaking at the funeral, Luul's father said the family declined a burial in an attempt to promote and protect the prestige and rights of Somali women.

On 15 May 2024, following an appeal by the defendant, the appeal court upheld the Banadir regional court's decision.

On 15 September 2024, the supreme court denied the suspect’s appeal to the supreme court, upheld the appeal court verdict.

== Background ==
Luul was born in Mogadishu on 19 May 1994. She was a mother of six and had memorized the Koran.
