= Mohamud Sayid Aden =

Somali politician

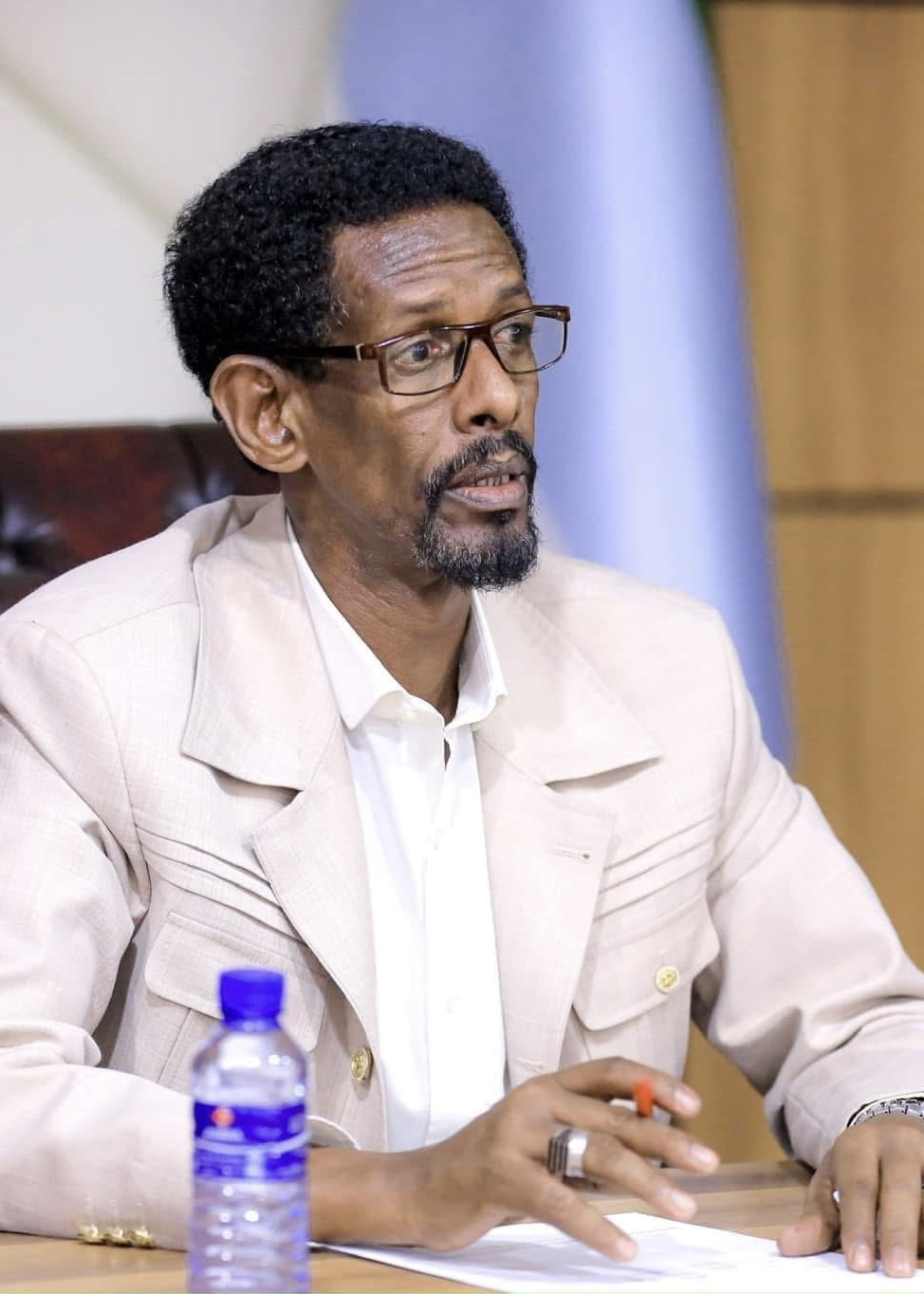

First Vice President of Jubaland
- Incumbent
- Assumed office May 2016
- President: Ahmed Mohamed Islam
- Preceded by: Abdulahi Sheik Ismael Fara-Tag

Personal details
- Occupation: politician

Mohamud Sayid Aden is a Somali politician. He is the First Vice President of Jubaland under President Ahmed Mohamed Islam, also known as Ahmed Madobe, since May 2016.
