= ICEPCVE =

Regional platform

The IGAD Center of Excellence for Preventing and Countering Violent Extremism (ICEPCVE) is a regional platform for training, coordination and connectivity, knowledge sharing, community & civil society organization engagement, strategic communication and research on preventing/countering violent extremism for government and civil society actors in the Eastern and Horn of Africa region.

== Formation ==
ICEPCVE was established in 2016 and officially inaugurated in May 2018.

== Mandate ==
ICEPCVE's mandate as a regional coordinating body on P/CVE includes expediting partnerships between governments, non-governmental organizations and sub-national actors as well as capturing numerous locally led efforts to build community resilience against violent extremism in the Horn of Africa and the East African region.
