= Daljirka Dahsoon =

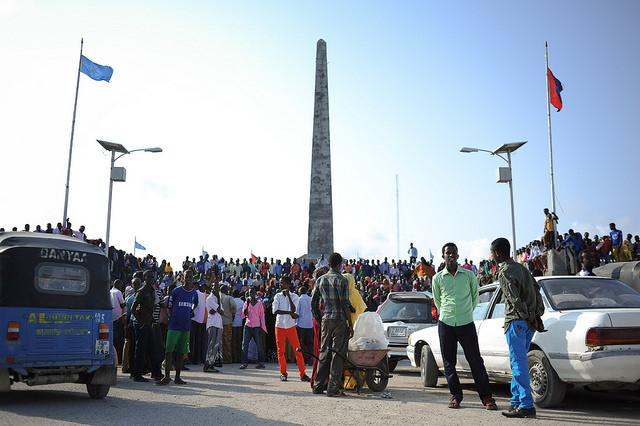
Daljirka Dahsoon, located in Mogadishu.

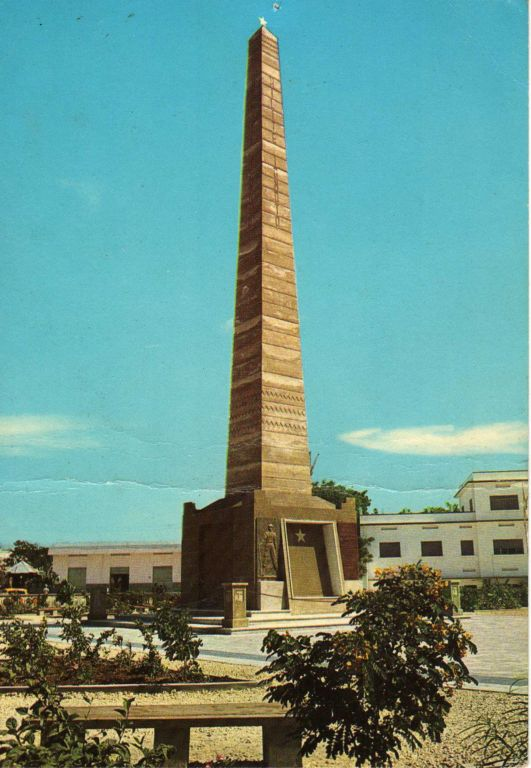
Image of the monument when it was new, before the Somali Civil War.

Daljirka Dahsoon is a Tomb of the Unknown Soldier memorial located in Mogadishu, Somalia. The monument was erected in honour of the Somali men and women who died in defense of the Somali Republic. It is an important landmark in Mogadishu. In July 2017, president of Somalia, Farmaajo laid flowers on its steps in commemoration of those who have given their life for the freedom of Somalis.
