= Mohamed Abdi Affey =

Kenyan politician

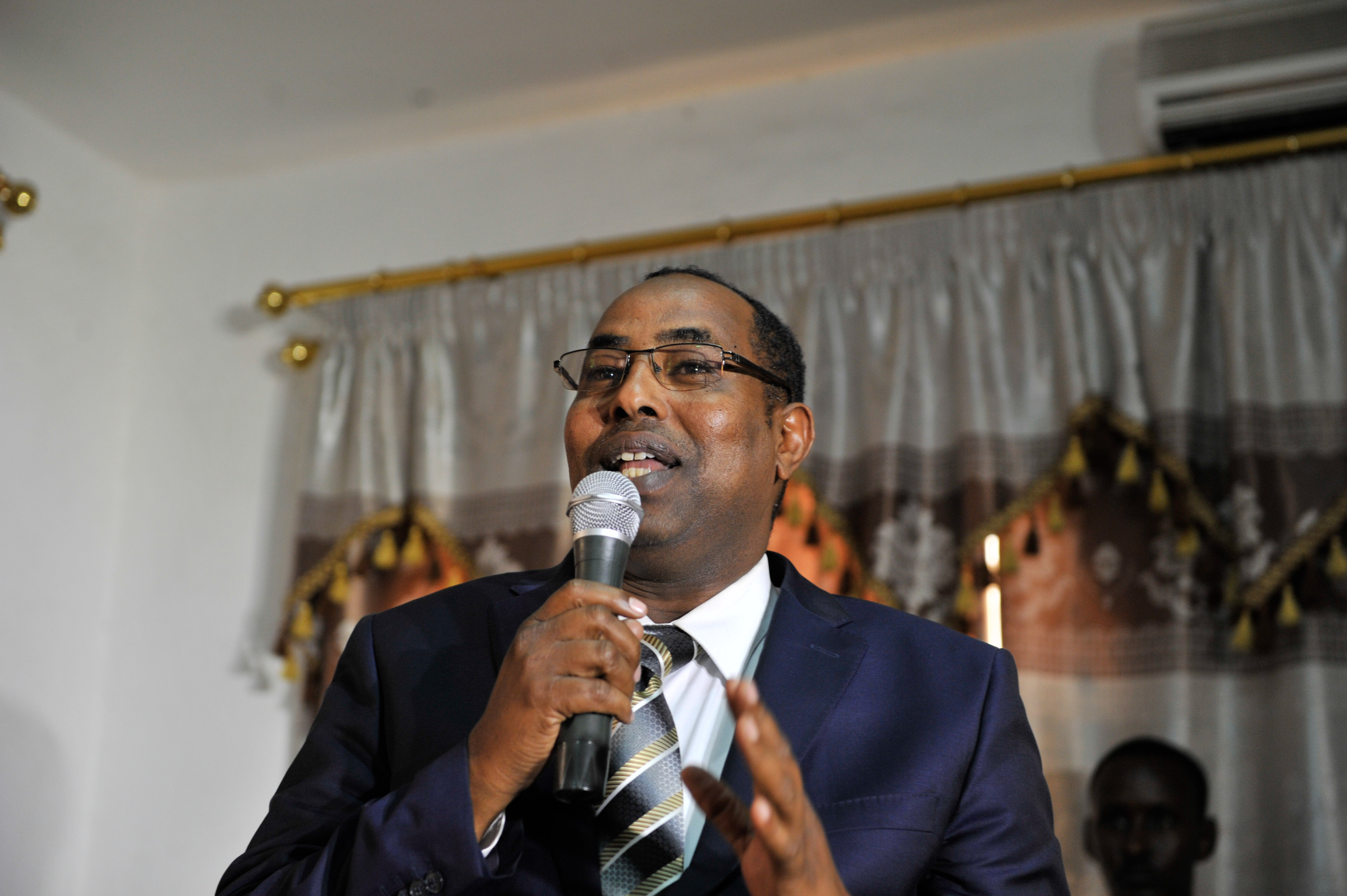
- Mohamed Abdi Afey at the signing ceremony for the formation of Somalia's Federal State of Hiran and Middle Shabelle in Mogadishu, Somalia, on August 8, 2015

Personal details
- Born: 1968 (age 57–58) Wajir County, Kenya
- Party: Kenya African National Union
- Education: University of Nairobi
- Occupation: Diplomat

Amb. Mohamed Abdi Affey (born 1968) is a Kenyan politician who is currently serving as the United Nations High Commissioner for Refugees (UNHCR) Special Envoy for the Horn of Africa and former UNHCR Special Envoy to the Somalia Refugee situation. Before joining UNHCR, Affey was the IGAD'S Special Envoy to Somalia and a member of Parliament for Wajir South Constituency (1997-2002). He also served as a nominated member of parliament (2008-2013) for ODM-Kenya, Kenya's Ambassador to Somalia (2003-2007) and Deputy Minister of the Ministry of Foreign Affairs of Kenya (1997-2002).

== Education ==
Affey holds a master's degree in International Conflict Management from the University of Nairobi and a bachelor's degree in Sociology and Political Science from Kenyatta University. He fluently speaks Somali, English and Kiswahili.

== Political life ==
At 27 years old, Affey was one of the youngest politicians in Kenya's history to be elected to Parliament, representing Wajir South constituency on a KANU Party ticket. He served a stint in the Ministry of Foreign Affairs as Deputy Minister from 1997 to 2002. In 2002, Affey tried to defend his nominated parliamentary seat on a KANU ticket, but lost in the primaries.

In July 2003, President Mwai Kibaki appointed him as Kenya's Ambassador to Somalia, a position he held until May 2007 before he resigned and served as a nominated member of parliament for ODM-Kenya until 2013. He then vied for the Senator of Wajir County on a WIPER Party ticket which he lost. He was thereafter appointed as the IGAD's Special Envoy to Somalia and served for three years.

In 2016, Affey was appointed by the High Commissioner for Refugees, Filippo Grandi, to become the UNHCR Special Envoy to the Somalia Refugee situation, one of the most protracted refugee situations in the world. During his mandate, he actively participated in the development and implementation of the IGAD Nairobi Declaration for Refugees, aiming to deliver durable solutions for more than 900,000 Somali refugees as well as over a million displaced persons within Somalia.

In 2018, he was appointed as the first UNHCR Special Envoy for the Horn of Africa, covering the eight IGAD countries. His mandate consists mainly in political advocacy to find durable solutions for the displaced population in the Horn of Africa, and is also extended to parliamentary engagement, resource mobilization and stakeholder engagement (including the private sector, diaspora and celebrities).

The UNHCR Special Envoy for the Horn of Africa is currently based in Nairobi but often travels in the region and worldwide to perform his mandate.
