= El Dher District =

El Dher District Eldher
- District
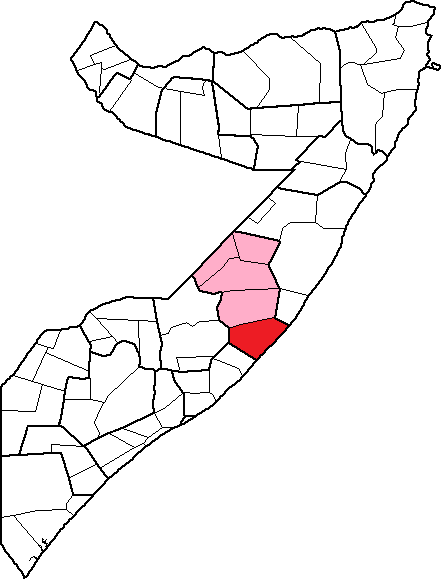
- Location of El Dher District within the Galguduud region.
- Coordinates: 4°5′19″N 47°5′9″E
- Country: Somalia
- Region: Galguduud
- Regional State: Galmudug
- Time zone: UTC+3 (EAT)

El Dher District (Somali: Degmada Ceel Dheer, Arabic:عيل طير) is a district in the south east Galguduud region of Somalia.

== Demographics ==
El Dher is primarily inhabited by the Weceysle sub-clan of the Hawiye, with the Sabti sub-clan forming the majority with the H.idinle sub-clan of the Gumcadle.

== See also ==
- Battle of El Dher
