= Kaxda, Mogadishu =

kax-Sheekhaal
- Neighbourhood
- Country: Somalia
- Region: Banaadir
- City: Mogadishu

Population
  - Total: 92,000
- Time zone: UTC+3 (EAT)

Kaxda Neighbourhood (Somali: Kax Shiiqaaleed) also spelled Kahda is a neighbourhood in the southeastern Banaadir region of Somalia. It includes the northeastern neighborhoods of the national capital, Mogadishu.
