= 2024 El Dher attack =

Battle in the Al-Shabaab attack on El Dher Town (2024)

Battle of El Dher
- Part of Somali Civil War and Somali civil war (2009–present)
Date	8 June 2024; 2 years ago 04:00—09:11
Location	El Dher District 4°05′19″N 47°05′09″E
Result	Al-Shabaab initial success; FGS secured the town post victory – see § Result

Belligerents
Al-Shabaab	Somalia; Galmudug ATMIS

Commanders and leaders
Unknown	Lt. Col. Yonis Hassan Sabriye †; Lt. Col. Abdulle Mohamud Abdi †

Units involved
Al-Shabaab: Unknown	Somali Armed Forces: Somali National Army; Galmudug Security Force; Ma'awisley militia; US AFRICOM

Casualties and losses
60+ militants killed (Somali Government claim)	59+ SNA killed (Al-Shabaab claim); 5 killed (Somali Government claim)
- 20+ civilians killed

On June 8, 2024, Al-Shabaab militants attacked four military bases and overran the town of El Dher for several hours, killing many soldiers of the Somali National Force. The militants were eventually defeated by a U.S.-assisted airstrike. This was the deadliest terrorist attack since the Aws Wayne debacle.

== Background ==
For months, security observers believed Al-Shabaab was going to attack El-Dher and Harardhere as both towns host forward operating bases. President Hassan Sheikh Mohamud visited both towns in early April to show solidarity with the forces. Al-Shabaab had previously attacked Harardhere in late April, but government troops repulsed that attack and inflicted losses on Al-Shabaab.

== Attack ==
The attack on El Dher began at pre-dawn around 4 am local time on Saturday with Al-Shabaab employing three suicide vehicle-borne improvised explosive devices (SVBIEDs) to breach the defenses of the Somali National Army bases. The initial assault caused confusion and panic both SNA and (Somali: Macawisley) forces, leading some to flee their positions. The militants detonated explosives on at least two camps, followed by an infantry attack.

Government forces reportedly launched a counterattack with the support of airstrikes, attempting to regain control of the situation. The fighting lasted for hours, and reinforcement forces from Masagaway town ambushed Al-Shabaab, inflicting losses on the militant fighters.

== Aftermath ==
=== Result ===
In the aftermath of the battle, conflicting claims emerged from both sides. The Somali government claimed to have killed 47 Al-Shabaab fighters, although no bodies were presented as evidence. They reported that 9 militants were killed in the first phase of the attack outside El-Dheer, followed by an ambush near Ali Yabaal village where 18 militants were killed. An airstrike targeted the remaining Al-Shabaab fighters in Ali Yabaal village, killing at least 20 fighters.

On the other hand, Al-Shabaab claimed to have killed dozens of SNA soldiers and Macawisley militia members, including two colonels, which was partially confirmed by Facebook obituaries. Al-Shabaab also claimed to have killed 59 soldiers and fighters and published purported pictures of their fighters in at least one camp they claimed to have overrun.

Two military officers, Colonel Yonis Hassan Sabriye and Colonel Abdulle Mohamud Abdi, were confirmed killed in the attack. Communication in the town has been restored, and Somali officials stated that the militants suffered heavy losses.

=== Reactions ===
Former President Sharif Sheikh Ahmed condemned the attack and suggested three measures the government could take to prevent Al-Shabaab ambushes.

Turkish Ministry of Foreign Affairs released statement regarding the terrorist attack in Somalia.

We are deeply saddened by the loss of lives and injuries caused by the terrorist attack in El Dheer, Somalia, on June 8.

We strongly condemn this heinous act and wish Allah's mercy upon those who lost their lives. We offer our condolences to their families, and to the people and Government of Somalia, and we wish a speedy recovery to the wounded.

Türkiye will continue to stand by Somalia in its fight against terrorism.

== See also ==
- List of terrorist incidents in 2024
