= Jaffey farm airstrike =

2024 Turkish drone TB2 airstrike on a farm in Lower Shabelle, Somalia

- Part of Somali Civil War and the Somali civil war (2009–present)
- Type: Airstrike
- Location: 1°46′6″N 44°23′24″E
- Date: 18 March 2024; 2 years ago
- Executed by: Somali Armed Forces operations supported by Turkish Bayraktar TB2 drones
- Casualties: 23 civilians (according to Amnesty), over 30 Al-Shabaab militants (according to FGS) killed 17 civilians (according to Amnesty), zero (according to FGS) injured

On 18 March 2024, Turkish Bayraktar TB2 drone strikes hit the Jaffey farm (Somali: Beerta Jaffey), about three kilometers west of Bagdad village in the Lower Shabelle region of Somalia, between 8 pm and 8:30 pm, during Somali military operations against Al-Shabaab.

Amnesty International reported that the strikes killed 23 civilians, including 14 children, five women, and four men. Another 17 civilians were injured: 11 children, two women, and four men. All victims were from the Gorgaarte clan.

The Somali Ministry of Information stated that Somali forces, in coordination with international partners, claimed to have killed over 30 Al-Shabaab militants in the villages of Bagdad and Baldooska. It added that 15 Al-Shabaab members were killed in an airstrike in Bagdad. Amnesty International sent letters to the Somali government asking for details about the operation, but did not receive a response.

Al-Shabaab issued a statement condemning the attack, publishing the names of twenty victims, and reiterated that none of their members were present in the area at the time of the attacks.

Amnesty International has stated that the strikes may amount to war crimes and called for them to be investigated as such. (Note: This article draws on Amnesty International’s investigation and the Somali government’s official statements.)

The victims and other residents confirmed the drone strikes followed heavy ground fighting that started earlier that day between the armed group Al-Shabaab and Somali Armed Forces close to the villages of Jambalul and Bagdad.

== Background ==
The Federal Government of Somalia has been conducting a major military offensive against the al-Qaeda-affiliated jihadist group Al-Shabaab, which controls significant territory in southern and central Somalia. The offensive is aimed at eliminating the terrorist threat, protecting Somali civilians, and restoring state authority. It is led by the Danab Brigade (trained by the United States) and receives air support from both U.S. and Turkish forces.

The conflict has caused severe harm to civilians. Amnesty International has documented violations of international humanitarian law by both Somali government forces and Al-Shabaab.

== The strikes ==
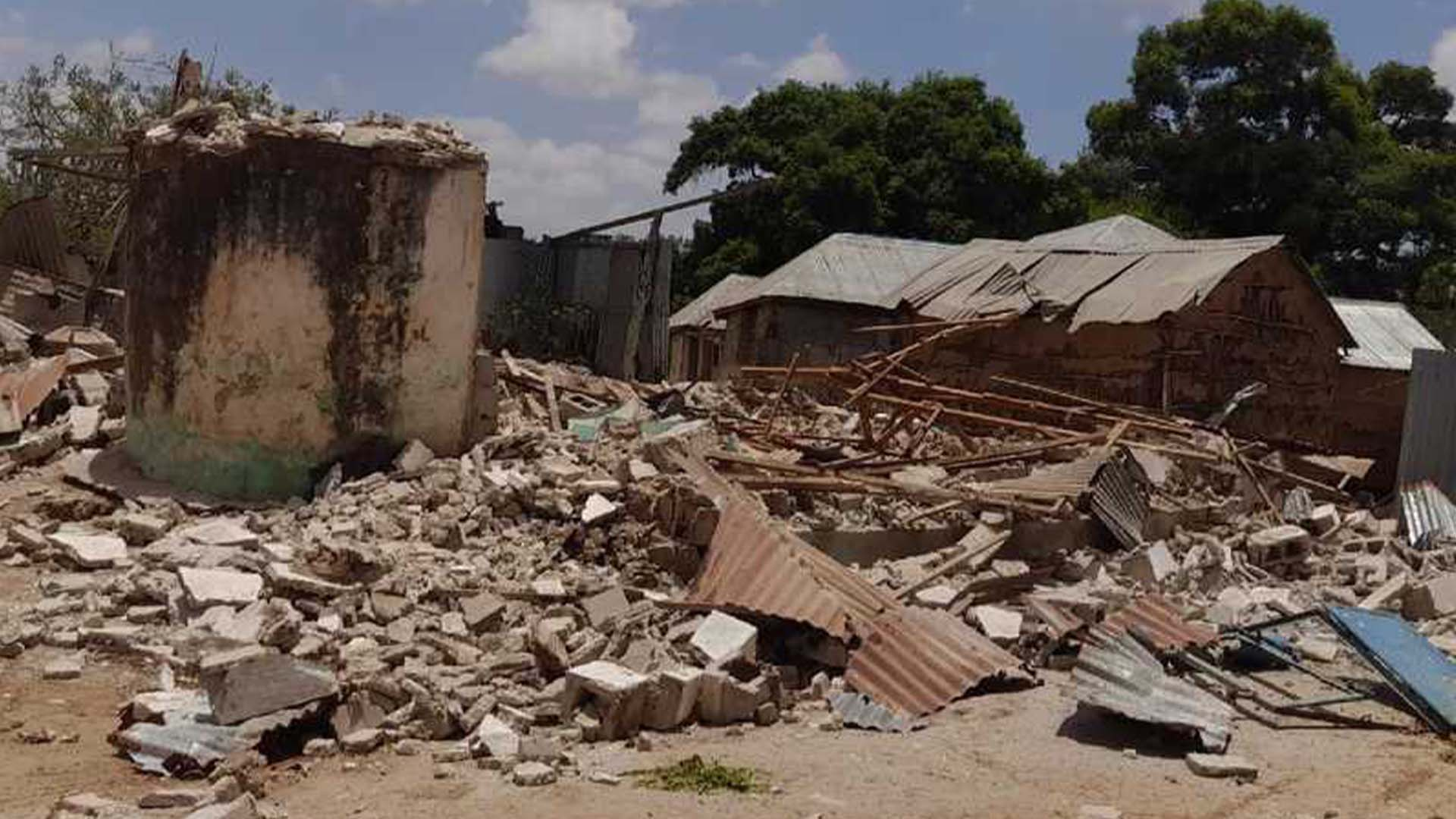
Aftermath of the strike, which killed at least 23 civilians

On 19 March 2024, Somalia’s Ministry of Information issued a statement stating that Somali forces had killed over 30 Al-Shabaab militants in the villages of Bagdad and Baldooska in coordination with “international partners.” The statement said the operation responded to intelligence that Al-Shabaab fighters were gathering and planning an assault against the Somali people, with 15 militants reportedly killed in an airstrike in Bagdad.

According to Amnesty International’s investigation, which included interviews with eyewitnesses, heavy ground fighting occurred earlier on 18 March between Al-Shabaab and Somali security forces near Jambaluul and Bagdad. An initial drone strike reportedly hit a mosque on the eastern side of Bagdad around 7:30 pm. Many civilians then sought refuge at the Jaffey farm. A first strike on the farm caused casualties; approximately 30 minutes later a second strike hit the farm and nearby areas, killing and injuring more people, including civilians from Alifow and Gaalgube who had come to help survivors.

It remains unclear whether Turkish or Somali personnel were operating the TB2 at the time of the Jaffey farm strikes. A Somali government source has said National Intelligence and Security Agency personnel fly the TB2s in operations against Al-Shabaab. Turkey has stated that it operates the drones itself in the fight against terrorism and has not transferred them in violation of the UN arms embargo. In 2022 the UN Panel of Experts reported concerns about Turkish drone supplies; Turkey rejected the violation claim. Somali and Turkish officials have cooperated closely on counter-terrorism, including training of Somali units and a 2024 Defense and Economic Cooperation Framework Agreement.

== Casualties ==
Amnesty International reported that the strikes killed 23 civilians (14 children, 5 women, 4 men) and injured 17 others (11 children, 2 women, 4 men), all from the Gorgaarte clan. These occurred after heavy ground fighting between Al-Shabaab and Somali forces near Jambaluul and Bagdad.

== Aftermath ==
Amnesty International wrote to the Somali and Turkish governments and to AFRICOM on 5 April 2024 requesting information about the operation and which forces were controlling the drone. None had responded by the time of Amnesty’s report.
