= Amun Abdullahi =

Swedish-Somali journalist (1974–2024)

- Amuun Cabdulaahi Koraaye
- Born: 23 October 1974; Mogadishu, Somalia
- Died: 19 October 2024 (aged 49); Lower Shabelle, Afgoye, Somalia
- Cause of death: Gunshot wound
- Citizenship: Somali and Swedish
- Occupations: Journalism; Agriculture
- Years active: 1991–2024
- Employer(s): SR International and Sveriges Radio
- Organization(s): Somali Youth Center, Rinkeby
- Awards: 2010: Swedish Publicists' Association Freedom of Speech prize in memory of Anna Politkovskaya

Amun Abdullahi Mohammed (Somali: Amuun Cabdulaahi Maxamed Koraaye, Arabic: أمون عبدالله ; 23 October 1974 – 19 October 2024) was a Somali-Swedish journalist and founder of a girls' school in Mogadishu, Somalia. She was murdered by an unidentified group of masked men who were believed to be members of Al-Shabaab in the Shabelle region capital city of Afgooye.

== Biography ==
Amun Abdullahi grew up in Somalia and came in the 1990s to Sweden as a refugee. In Sweden, she lived first in Umeå, then Stockholm's Rinkeby district, and finally Kista, before moving back to Mogadishu.

In Stockholm, she worked for SR International, and made several high-profile reports broadcast on Sveriges Radio. Among other things, she revealed in 2009 that a leader of a youth center in Rinkeby recruited young people to the Somali Islamist militia al-Shabab.

She had been both physically and intellectually attacked and repeatedly threatened due to her work. She claimed that Sweden is "more dangerous than Mogadishu" for a journalist who wants to tell the truth.

== Death ==
On 19 October 2024, at the age of 49, Amun Abdullahi was assassinated by an unidentified masked group of men who were believed to be Al-Shabaab while staying at her farmhouse near Afgooye in the Lower Shabelle region. The perpetrators escaped after the killing.

== Awards ==
- 2010: Swedish Publicists' Association Freedom of Speech prize in memory of Anna Politkovskaya.
