= Ras Kamboni =

Ras Kamboni رأس كامبوني
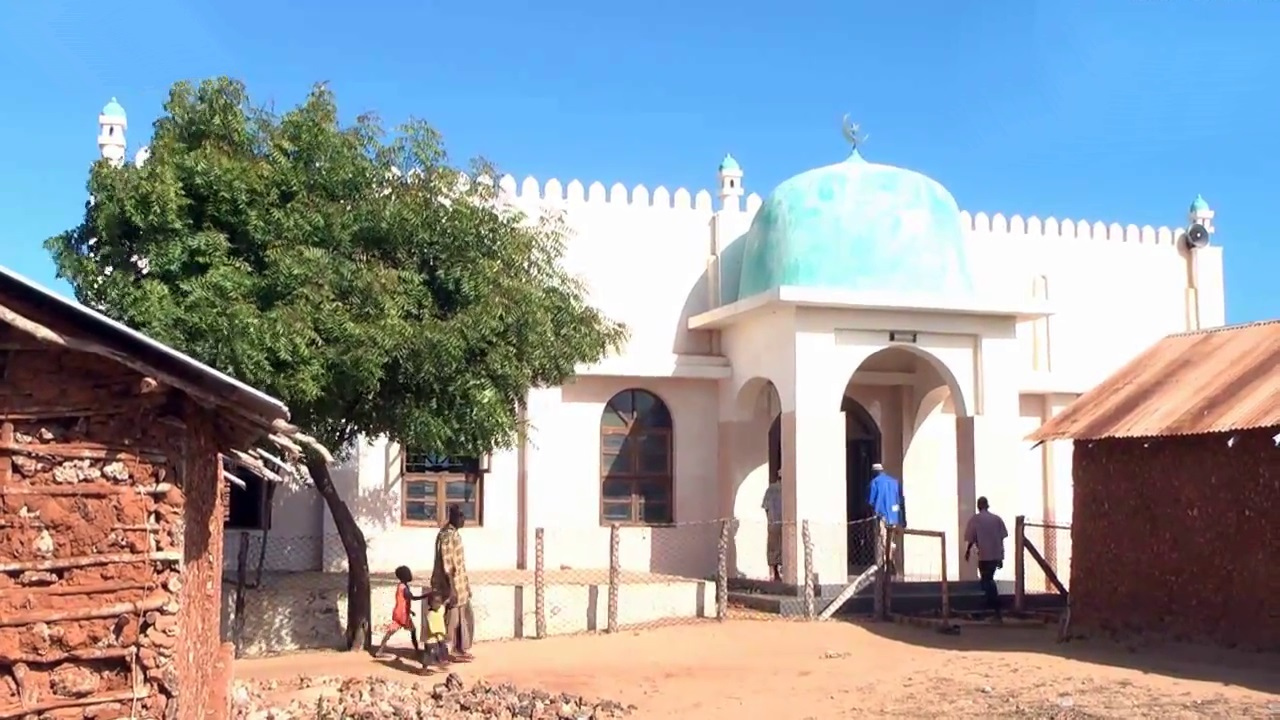

- Location in Somalia
- Coordinates: 1°38′S 41°35′E
- Country: Somalia
- State: Jubaland
- Region: Jubbada Hoose
- District: Ras Kamboni District
- Time zone: UTC+3 (EAT)

Kamboni (Arabic: رأس كامبوني; Somali: Raas Kambooni) is a district of Lower Juba region, Somalia, which lies on a peninsula near the border with Kenya. It is the southernmost town in Somalia. The tip of that peninsula is called Ras Kamboni (Cape Kamboni). The town is located 274 kilometers south of Kismayo. The Town population is 79,000. American officials have said that it has served as a training camp for extremists with connections to Al-Qaeda; al-Sharq al-Awsat reported in May 1999 that al-Qaeda was installing sophisticated communications equipment in the camp.

US security concerns in the Horn of Africa, particularly at Kamboni, heightened after the attacks on 9/11. On December 16, 2001, Paul Wolfowitz said the US was meeting with various Somali and Ethiopian contacts to "observe, survey possible escape routes, possible sanctuaries" for Al Qaeda operatives. On March 2, 2002 a briefing was held in the Pentagon discussing the possible use of Kamboni by Islamic terrorist groups, including al-Ittihaad al-Islamiya (AIAI) and Al Qaeda. In December 2002, the US established the Combined Joint Task Force - Horn of Africa (CJTF-HOA) to monitor developments in the region and to train local militaries on counterterrorism.

American officials believe that several terrorist attacks were orchestrated by Kamboni, including the 1998 United States embassy bombings and the 2002 Mombasa hotel bombing.

== Battle of Ras Kamboni ==
In the 2006 war in Somalia, Islamic Courts Union fighters fled Ethiopian troops to Kamboni, to make a last stand on the country's southernmost tip.

On January 8, 2007, during the battle, it was reported an AC-130 gunship belonging to the United States military had attacked suspected Al-Qaeda operatives in southern Somalia. It was also reported that the aircraft carrier USS Dwight D. Eisenhower had been moved into striking distance. The aircraft flew out of its base in Djibouti. Many bodies were spotted on the ground, but the identity of the dead or wounded was not yet established. The aid organization, Oxfam, reported at least 70 nomads were killed. The targeted leaders were tracked by the use of unmanned aerial vehicles (UAVs) as they headed south from Mogadishu starting on December 28.

=== Further developments ===
Al-Shabaab took control of Kamboni after the Ethiopian withdrawal. However, on October 20, 2011, Somali Transitional Federal Government forces seized control of the town in what a military spokesman characterised as a bloodless takeover.

=== 2024 battle ===
The Somali army launched an attack on the town of Ras Kamboni on December 11, 2024, to try and capture the town from Jubaland and overthrow the president of Jubaland, Ahmed Madobe. The Attack was repelled with at least 10 people being killed in fighting.
