= List of presidents of Jubaland =

Governor State of the Jubaland
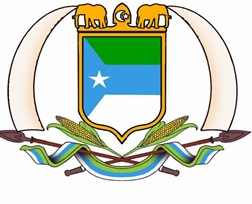
- Coat of arms

- Flag of Jubaland

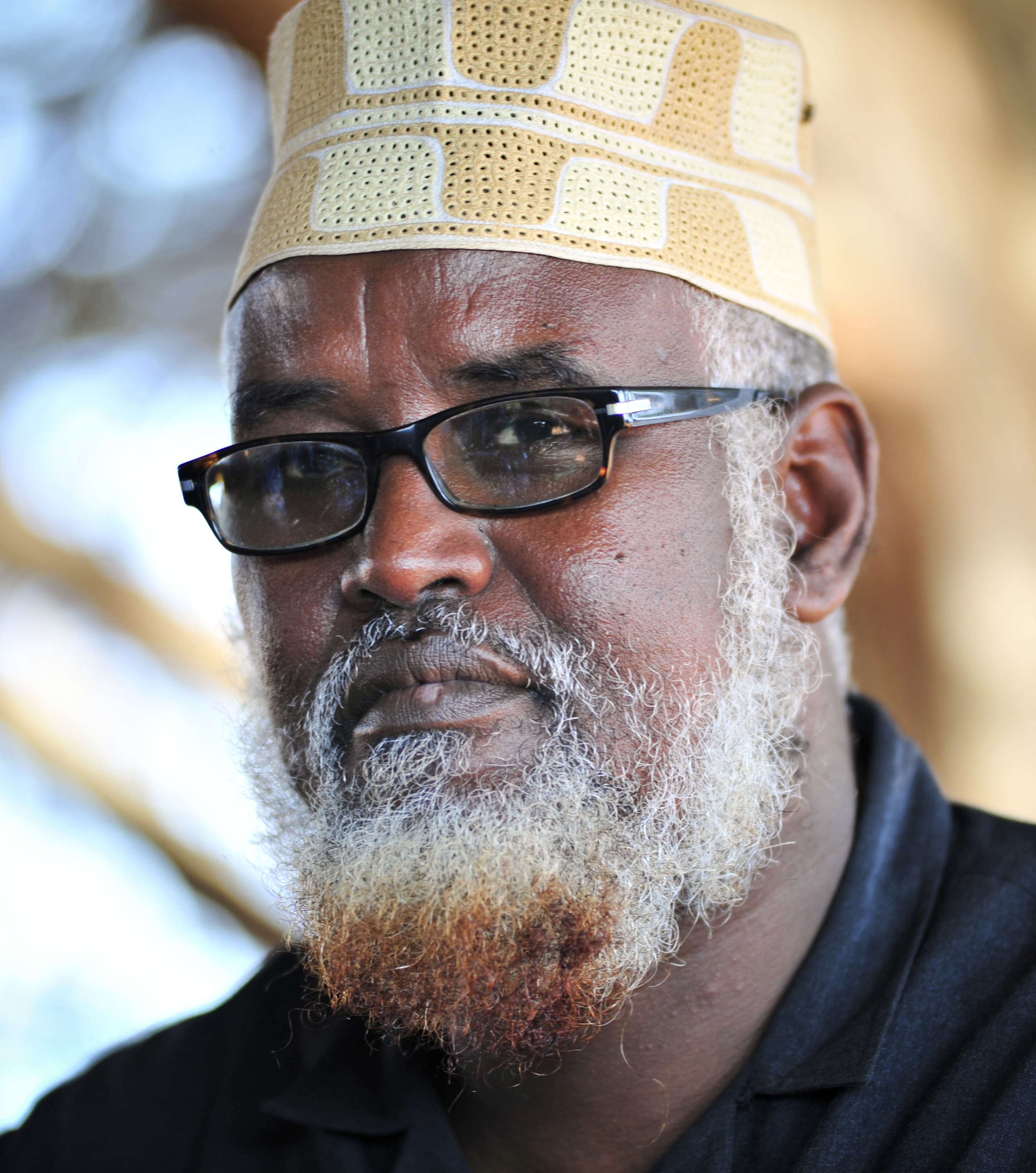
- Incumbent; Ahmed Mohamed Islam since 2013

This is a list of Governors of Jubaland, a federated state that is part of the Federal Republic of Somalia. The Governor state of Jubaland is an executive head of state: the Governor functions as the head of state, and is elected by Jubaland legislature to serve an indeterminate term.

Prior to achieving independence in 1960, the elected head of Jubaland in the form of a province and the time period was as follows.

== List ==
Portrait	Name (Birth–Death)	Term of Office		Vice President	Political Party
District Commissioner Jubaland
	John Lionel Bretherton (–)	1913	1922	n/a	n/a
	Cecil Thornehill Davenport (–)	1923	1923	n/a	n/a
(Kingdom of Italy) High Commissioner of Oltre Giuba (1924—1926)
	Corrado Zoli (1877–1951)	16 July 1924	31 December 1926	n/a	Independent
Chairman of Somali National Front
	Omar Haji Massale	22 February 1993	11 June 1999	n/a	Somali National Front
	Ahmed Warsame (–)	11 June 1999	18 June 2001	n/a	Somali National Front Allied Somali Forces
President of Jubaland
	Barre Adan Shire Hiiraale		3 April 2008	n/a	Jubba valley Alliance
President of Jubaland
	Ahmed Mohamed Islam (Madobe) (born 1951)	15 May 2013	Incumbent	Abdulahi Sheik Ismael Fara-Tag (2013-2016); Suldan Abdulkadir Mohamed Lugadere (2013-); Mohamud Sayid Aden (2016-)	Raskamboni Movement

== President of Jubaland Somalia ==
- List of presidents of Somaliland
- List of presidents of Puntland
- Lists of office-holders
