= Ahmed Mohamed Islam =

Somali politician (born 1951)

Sheikh Ahmed Mohamed Islam
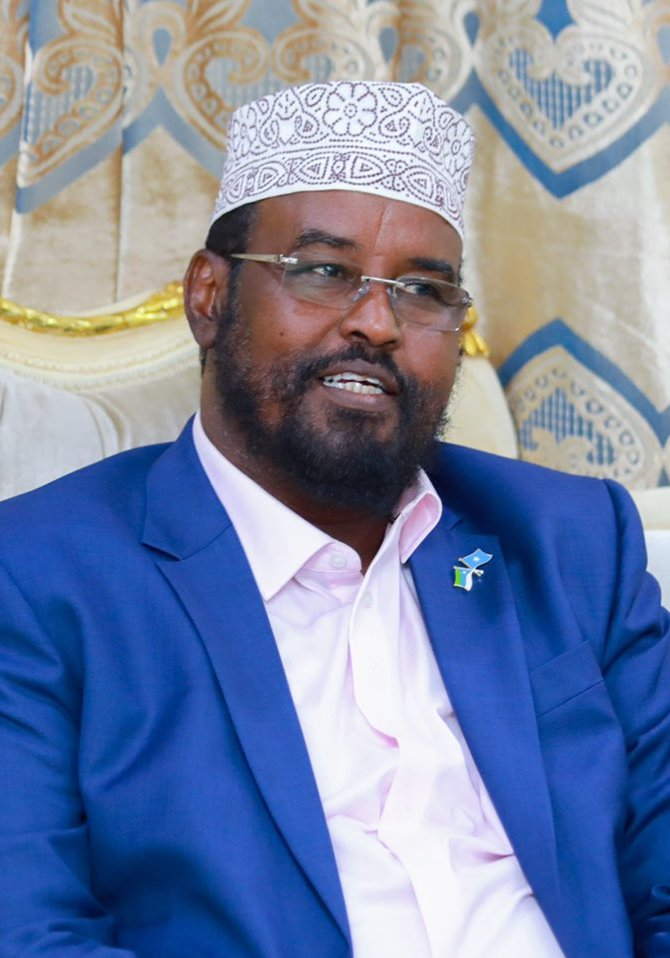

1st President of Jubaland
- Incumbent
- Assumed office 1 October 2012
- Vice President: Abdulahi Sheik Ismael Fara-Tag (2013-2016); Mohamud Sayid Aden (2016-)
- Preceded by: Mohamed Abdi Mohamed as the President of Azania

1st Chairman of the Raskamboni Movement
- Incumbent
- Assumed office 7 October 2009
- Deputy: Ma'alin Mohamed Ibrahim Mohamud (2009 - 2020); Abdinasir Seerar Maah (Since 2020)
- Preceded by: Office Established

Personal details
- Born: 1950 (age 75–76) Kebri Dahar, Ethiopia

Military service
- Battles/wars: Somali Rebellion; Somali Civil War (1991-2006); War in Somalia (2006–2009); Battle of Ras Kamboni (2007); Somali Civil War (2009–present); Battle of Kismayo (2012); Battle of Ras Kamboni (2024)

Sheikh Ahmed Mohamed Islam (Somali: Sheekh Axmed Maxamed Islam, Arabic: شيخ أحمد محمد إسلام) better known as Ahmed Madobe, is a Somali politician and a former militant who is the current president of the Jubaland state of Somalia and the chairman of the Raskamboni Movement.

During the early years of the Somali Civil War in the 1990s Madobe fought for Al-Itihaad Al-Islamiya and later served as a regional governor for the Islamic Courts Union in the mid-2000s. During the War in Somalia (2006–2009) he was captured by Ethiopian-American troops and made a prisoner of war. He was released in early 2009 and joined the post-Ethiopian military withdrawal Transitional Federal Parliament before resigning and joining the insurgent group Hizbul Islam.

Madobe helped lead Hizbul Islam troops in Kismayo during fighting against Al-Shabaab in 2009 and formed the Raskamboni Movement later that year. In 2012, the movement captured Kismayo with the aid of the Kenyan military and the following year he became the governor of Somalia's Jubaland state.

== Background ==
Ahmed Madobe was born in the Kebri Dahar in the Somali Region of Ethiopia. He moved to Mogadishu in his youth, completing high school in the city and then taking Islamic law at university. Before the collapse of the Somali Democratic Republic in 1991, Madobe was a member of Al-Itihaad Al-Islamiya. He fought for the group during its unsuccessful attempt to take Kismayo from United Somali Congress control in the early 1990s and later participated in raids against Ethiopia.

=== Islamic Courts Union ===
In early 2006, Madobe fought alongside the rising Islamic Courts Union (ICU) for control of Mogadishu from a warlord coalition. After participating in the take over of Kismayo during August 2006, he became governor of Lower Juba, Middle Juba, and Gedo (what is now Jubaland) until the ICU withdrew deep into southern Somalia following the full scale Ethiopian invasion in December 2006. During clashes with Ethiopian forces near Kismayo, Madobe narrowly survived an American airstrike, emerging as the sole survivor of a contingent though wounded by shrapnel. Madobe retreated towards the Kenyan border and was captured, later receiving medical treatment at an Ethiopian hospital. He was placed in prison where remained for the remainder of the Ethiopian military occupation.

After the Ethiopian withdrawal from Somalia in January 2009, Madobe was released and he joined the newly formed government of Sharif Sheikh Ahmed. On 4 April 2009, he announced his resignation from the parliament, claiming that he had only joined to get out of prison in Ethiopia and further warned Sharif's government to be "careful of foreign conspiracies."

=== Hizbul Islam ===
Madobe later joined Hizbul Islam and served as the local commander for Kismayo. In 2009, two Hizbul Islam factions (Raskamboni Movement and Muskar Anole) and Al-Shabaab held Kismayo jointly. After Al-Shabaab named its own governing council, excluding the other factions, it was denounced by Hizbul Islam. In October 2009, Hizbul Islam forces led by Madobe fought against Al-Shabaab over the city of Kismayo. When conflict later broke out between Hizbul Islam and Al-Shabaab, Madobe was blamed by Shabaab for the outbreak of violence.

== Jubaland presidency ==
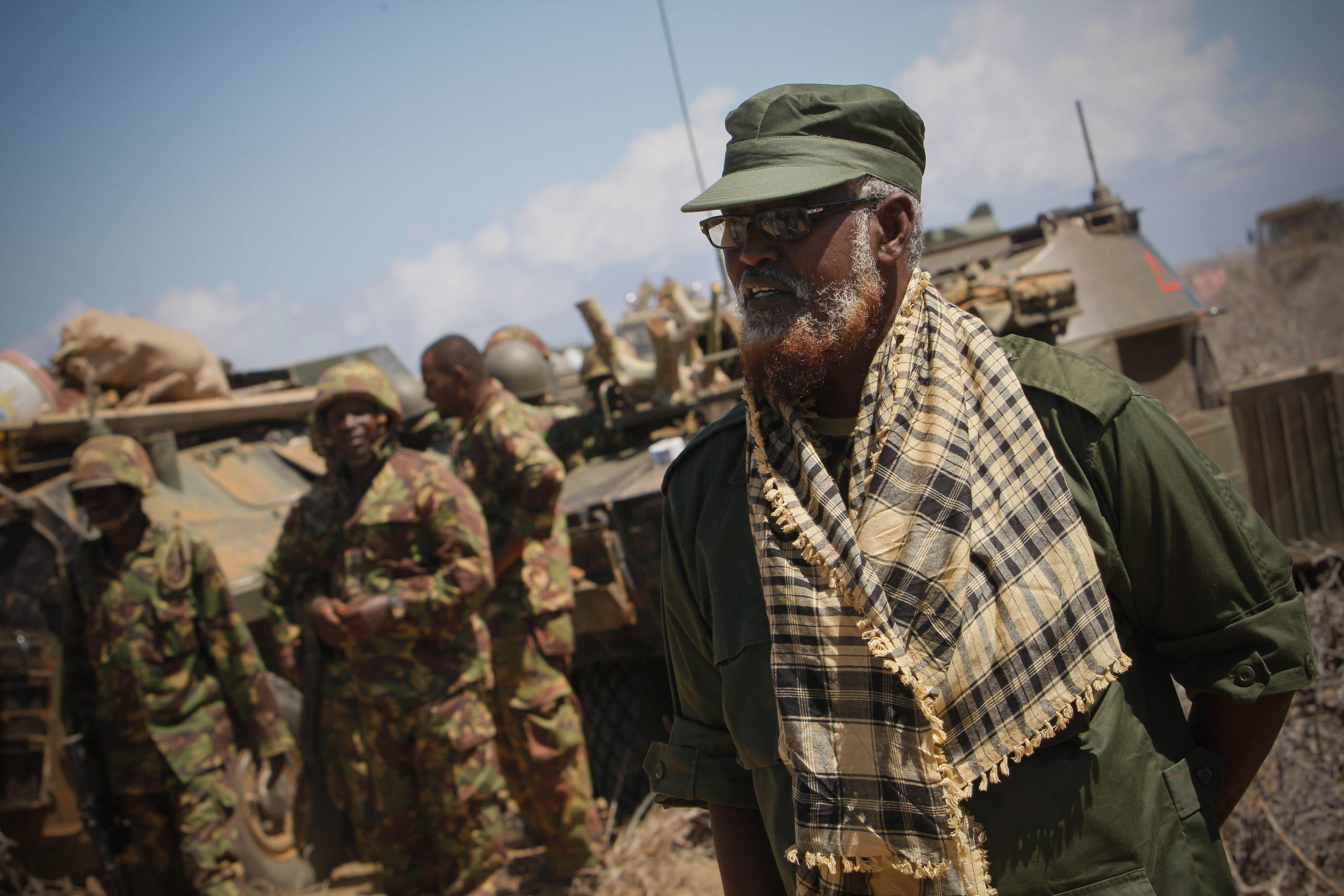
Madobe leading troops outside of the Al-Shabaab stronghold of Kismayo (2012)

Madobe who was the leader of the Raskamboni Movement was elected as the interim head of the Jubaland Administration on the 1st of October 2012 after his forces with the support of the Kenya Defence Forces captured the strategic port city of Kismayo from Al-Shabaab, Eight months later on the 15th of May 2013 he was elected as the interim president of Jubaland in a Transition period of two years.

The Jubaland State of Somalia

The government of Jubaland, the Independent Election Committee of Jubaland and the Jubaland electorate, the federal constitution and the state constitution recognized Madobe as the legitimate president of Jubaland. The Somali Federal Government, in violation of both federal and state constitutions, recognised Madobe only as interim president.

=== National Reconciliation Agreement ===
On 28 August 2013, Madobe signed a national reconciliation agreement in Addis Ababa with the Somali federal government. Endorsed by the federal State Minister for the Presidency Farah Abdulkadir on behalf of President Hassan Sheikh Mohamud, the pact was brokered by the Foreign Ministry of Ethiopia and came after protracted bilateral talks.

Under the terms of the agreement, for a two-year period Jubaland would be administered by a Juba Interim Administration and led by the region's incumbent president, Madobe. The regional president would serve as the chairperson of a new Executive Council, to which he would appoint three deputies. Management of Kismayo's seaport and airport would also be transferred to the Federal Government after a period of six months, and revenues and resources generated from these infrastructures would be earmarked for Jubaland's service delivery and security sectors as well as local institutional development.

Additionally, the agreement included the integration of Jubaland's military forces under the central command of the Somali National Army (SNA), and stipulated that the Juba Interim Administration would command the regional police. UN Special Envoy to Somalia Nicholas Kay hailed the pact as "a breakthrough that unlocks the door for a better future for Somalia," with AUC, UN, EU and IGAD representatives also present at the signing.

=== 2015 election ===
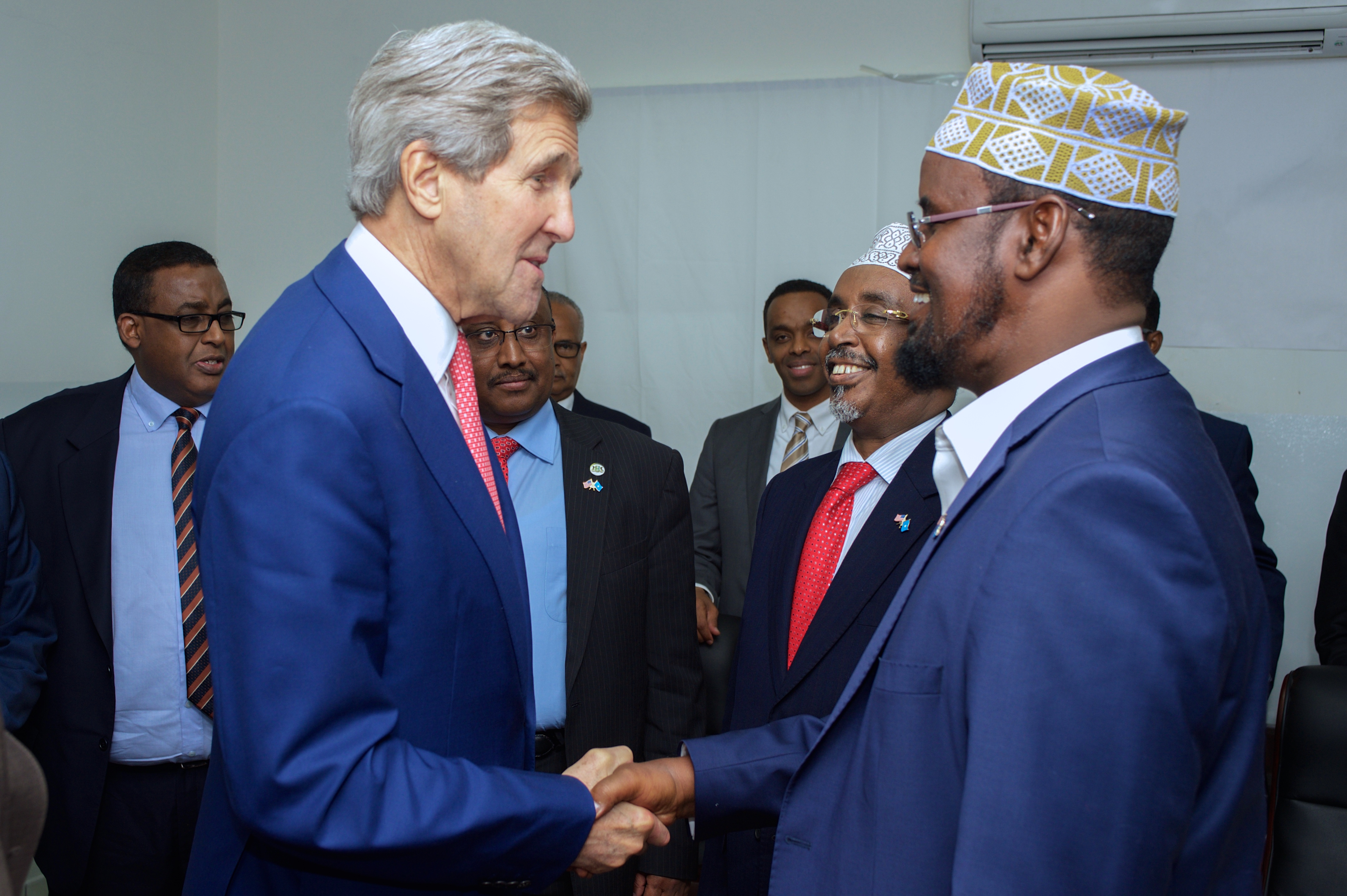
U.S. Secretary of State John Kerry shakes hands with Madobe, after arriving in Mogadishu, Somalia (6 May 2015)

On 15 August 2015, Madobe was re-elected by the Jubaland parliament with 68 votes as President of Jubaland State.

Madobe controversially won the elections of 2019 with no significant opponent. The opposition said Ahmed was undemocratic during his previous term commission and worked to skew results in his favour.

In August 2019 Madobe was sworn into office for four years. He won more than two-thirds of the votes cast by the semi-autonomous region's lawmakers in the port city of Kismayu.

The United Nations had called on all stakeholders to hold a “single electoral process that is credible, inclusive, fair and peaceful", but nevertheless the Federal Government of Somali boycotted the election backing a loyalist in a parallel election.

Tensions between FGS and Jubaland State escalated in March, when heavy fighting broke out near the Kenyan border between Somali troops and Jubaland forces. Kenya also accused FGS of violating its territorial integrity.

The FGS faced criticism from observers for engaging in political feuds with federal states to gain control in the upcoming election, rather than focusing on the fight against Islamist group Al-Shabaab. In June 2020 the FGS recognised Madobe, but only as interim president of Jubaland State with a two-year mandate, contrary to the Jubaland State constitution which provides for a four-year mandate.

=== Arrest warrant ===
On 28 November 2024, amid a dispute over the holding of presidential election in Jubaland, a judge in the latter region issued an arrest warrant against federal president Hassan Sheikh Mohamud on charges of treason, inciting a civil war, and organizing an armed uprising to disrupt the constitutional order. In response, the federal government issued an arrest warrant against Madobe for treason and revealing classified information to foreign entities.
