= Badhadhe District =

Badhaadhe Joore
- District
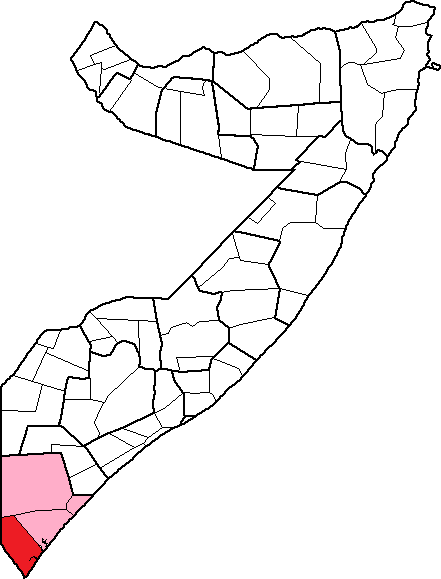
- Coordinates: 1.0332°S 41.4965°E
- Country: Somalia
- Region: Jubbada Hoose
- Established: 1920

Population
  - Total: 210,000
- Time zone: UTC+3 (EAT)

The Badhadhe District (Somali: Degmada Badhaadhe) is a district in the southern Lower Jubba Region of Somalia. Badhaadhe consists of Ras Kamboni, Kolbiyow, Hosingo, Waldena, Bulla Haji and islands such as Kudhaa.
