= List of Catholic dioceses in Somalia and Djibouti =

The Catholic hierarchy in Somalia and Djibouti, predominantly Muslim countries in the Horn of Africa, with ethnically akin population but different colonial heritage (Somalia British and Italian, Djibouti French), comprises only in each nation a single exempt diocese (directly dependent on the Holy See, not part of any ecclesiastical province) :

- Diocese of Mogadiscio, covering all and only Somalia
- Diocese of Djibouti, covering all and only Djibouti

Such tiny episcopates warrant no national episcopal conferences, but their Bishops participate in the (predominantly Middle Eastern) Episcopal Conference of the Latin Bishops of the Arab Regions.

Neither has an Eastern Catholic or pre-diocesan jurisdiction.

There are no titular sees. All defunct jurisdictions have a current successor see.

There formally are an Apostolic Nunciature (papal diplomatic representation at embassy-level) to Djibouti and an Apostolic Delegation (lower level) to Somalia, but both are vested in the Apostolic Nunciature to Ethiopia (which forms a transnational episcopal conference with Eritrea) in its capital Addis Ababa.

== See also ==
- List of Catholic dioceses (structured view)
- Catholic Church in Somalia
- Catholic Church in Djibouti

== Sources and external links ==
- GCatholic - Somalia
- GCatholic - Djibouti
