= Catholic Church in Somaliland =

Somaliland is an unrecognized de facto sovereign state in East Africa. The Holy See, in line with all other UN member states, does not recognize the independence of Somaliland, favouring a peaceful solution of unity for all of Somalia. Very few native Christians exist and, owing to its unrecognized status, few expatriate Christians are in the country either.

== Background ==
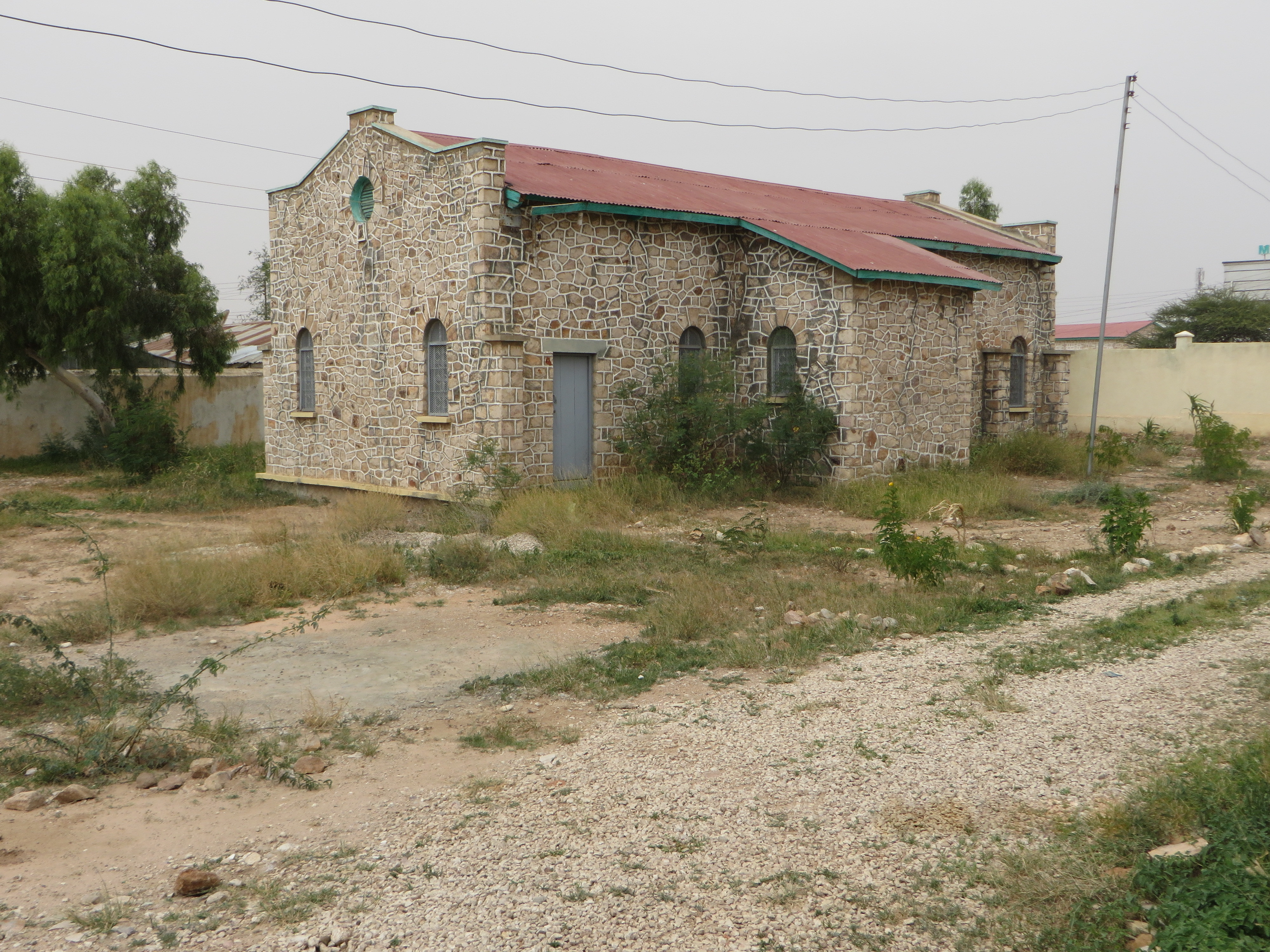
Roman Catholic church closed in 2017, Hargeisa, Somaliland

Christianity is a minuscule and fringe movement in Somalia. The few Christians, perhaps one or two hundred (in a region of more than 3,500,000 (2008 est.)), that can actually be counted, have come from the schools and orphanages of the Catholic missions of Aden, Djibouti, and of Berbera. The closest currently functioning diocese is the Diocese of Djibouti, to the north of Somaliland, although it nominally falls under the Diocese of Mogadishu. No organized church, including the Catholic Church, operates. The religion of Somaliland is overwhelmingly Islamic.

== History ==
There has been Catholic missionary activity in Somaliland, but since the Somali Civil War, no Catholic missions operate. In colonial days, British Somaliland was under the care of the Vicariate Apostolic of Arabia, like the Vicariate Apostolic of the Gallas (including French Somaliland as well as its Ethiopian main territory) confided to the Order of Friars Minor Capuchin. While Ethiopia has an ancient Ethiopian Orthodox Church and native Christianity for nearly 1800 years, ethnic Somalis did not convert in great numbers. Efforts at expanding the church were focused in southern Somalia where Italian colonists were immigrating. British Somaliland was left generally to the Church of England, which did not prioritize the small protectorate. Italian Somaliland was detached in 1904 from the Vicariate Apostolic of Zanzibar, erected into the Prefecture Apostolic of Benadir, and confided to the ancient Order of the Holy Trinity or Trinitarians.

In 2017, it was reported that the only Catholic Church in Somaliland was closed days after it was reopened due to "public pressure". The reopening ceremony of the Church of Saint Antonio of Lisbon was held on the 29 July in the presence of expatriates and ministers. It is one of a number of churches that were built 70 years ago during British rule. The church is located in the Shaab district in the capital of the region, Hargeisa, and it was closed for three decades. A few days after the opening, Religious Affairs Minister Khalil Abdullah Ahmad made a statement saying that the reopening of the church "has caused a lot of division" which was counter to the nation's interest. He also stated that the government would keep the church closed as has been for decades to "respect the wishes of the people", further asserting that Islamic law allows foreigners to work in Somaliland and "practice their religious rituals in private".

== See also ==
- Christianity in Somaliland
- Italian Somalis
- Roman Catholic Diocese of Mogadiscio
