= Christianity in Somaliland =

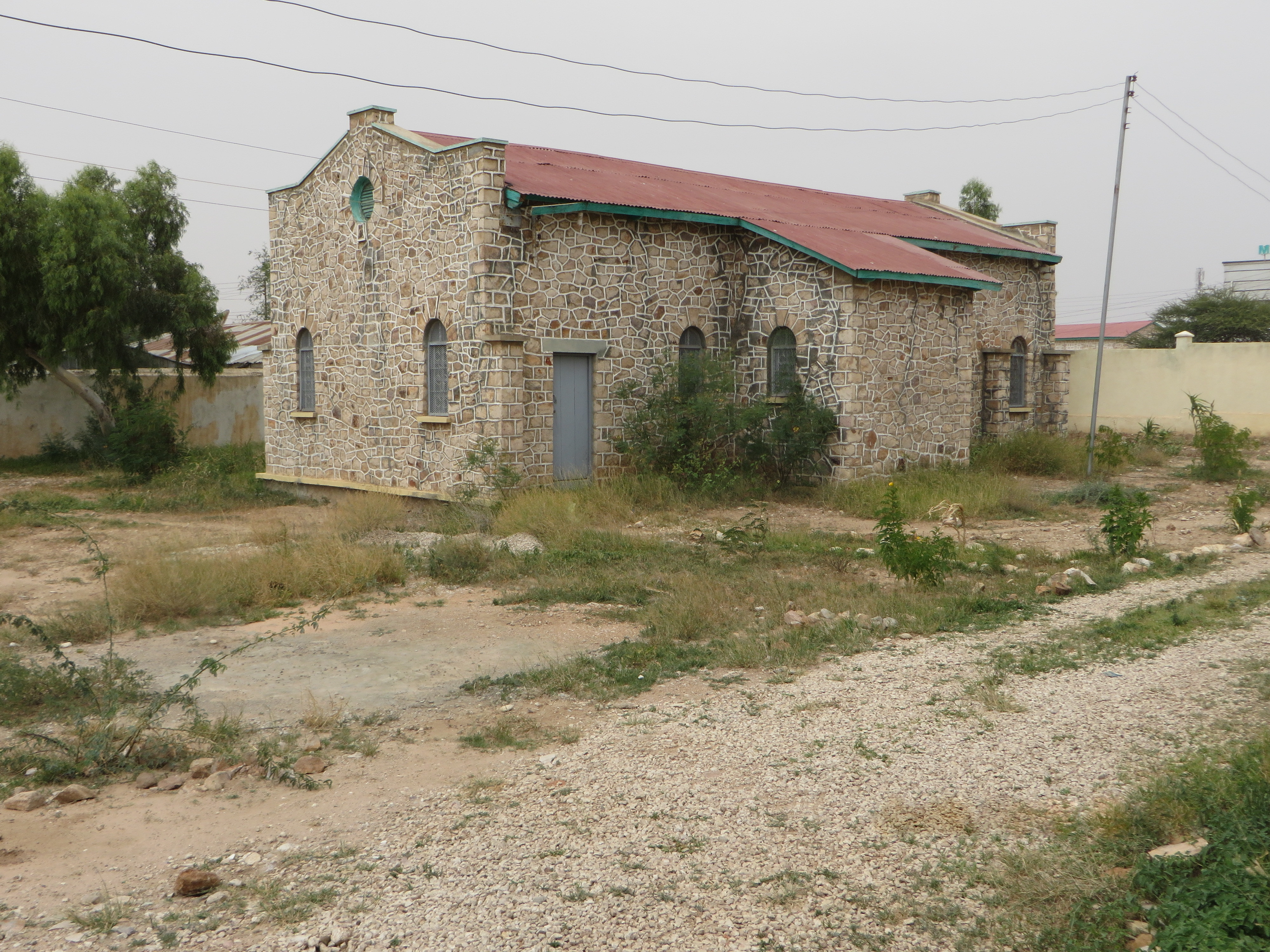
The Saint Anthony of Padua Catholic Church, the sole Christian church in Somaliland; located in Hargeisa, was closed not long after opening in 2016

Christianity in Somaliland is a minority religion. While freedom of religion exists in Somaliland, Islam is the state religion, and renouncing or converting from Islam remains both illegal and prosecutable: making evangelization effectively impossible. In the partially recognised nation that was estimated to be 99.8% Muslim in 2017, the number of adherents is additionally hard to measure due to fear of persecution by terrorist organizations such as Al-Shabaab. The total number of Christians is made up of a small amount of local adherents and converts, with the majority being foreigners involved with humanitarian and intergovernmental organizations.

The largest denomination of adherents are Catholics, with its operations being overseen by the Bishop of Djibouti under the title of Apostolic Administrator of Mogadishu, as the title of Bishop of Mogadishu has been vacant since the assassination of its last bishop in 1989. A single Catholic church was rehabilitated and dedicated to Saint Anthony of Padua in the capital of Hargeisa in 2016. The church was closed shortly after, however, and all adherents were once again to practice their faith in private. Despite this, being a Christian in Somaliland is still considered to be more viable than in neighboring Somalia.

Christian-based organizations like the Catholic humanitarian group Caritas International (operating locally under "Caritas Naxariis"), complete charitable work such as education and relief in Somaliland, likewise acting as the largest influence of the church in the nation. Caritas Naxariis in particular, whose president is also the Bishop of Djibouti, served 35 displaced children in 2021.

== History ==
=== British Somaliland ===
In 1913, during the early period of the colonial era, there were practically no Christians in Somaliland, with about 100 to 200 adherents coming from schools and orphanages affiliated with the Catholic missions in the Protectorate of British Somaliland. The small number of Christians in the region today comes mostly from similar Catholic institutions in Aden, Djibouti and Berbera.

== See also ==
- Religion in Somaliland
- Christianity in Somalia
