= Mogadishu riots of July 1989 =

Series of political riots against the Barre Regime

Mogadishu Riots of 1989
- Part of Somali Rebellion
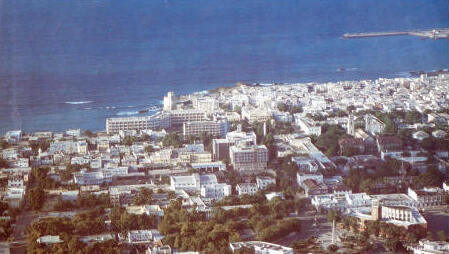
- Mogadishu in the 1980's
- Native name: Jimcaha Madoow (Black Friday)
- Location: Mogadishu, Somalia
- Date: 14 July 1989; 37 years ago
- Deaths: Approx. 400 civilians killed
- Injuries: Approx. 1,000+ civilians injured
- Perpetrator: Siad Barre regime

The Mogadishu riots of July 1989 (Somali: Jimcaha Madoow, lit. 'Black Friday') were a series of violent events that took place in the capital city of Somalia on 14 and 15 July 1989. A significant event in modern Somali history, the riot and killings that followed were the first serious violence Mogadishu had seen and preluded the approaching Somali Civil War. The event was sparked by the assassination of Roman Catholic Bishop of Mogadishu Salvatore Colombo and the subsequent arrest of several Muslim religious leaders by the Barre regime.

According to human rights groups and independent sources, the violence, which was overwhelmingly carried out by government forces, resulted in approximately 400 killed and over 1,000 injured. The Somali government, however, denied these reports and claimed that only 23 people died and 59 were injured. In the aftermath of the riots, around 2,000 people were arrested and 46 men from the Isaaq clan were summarily executed by the military outside Mogadishu in an event now known as the Jazeera Beach Massacre.

The explosion of violence in the capital led to international condemnation towards the Barre regime, withdrawals of foreign support and inflamed anti government sentiments.

== Assassination of Archbishop Colombo and arrest of Sheikhs ==
=== 9 July assassination of Archbishop Colombo ===
Pietro Salvatore Colombo was an Italian Catholic who served as the Bishop of Mogadishu and had lived in Somalia since 1948. Colombo was well regarded by both the Catholic community and the Muslim Somali population. He was closely linked with many of the cities imams and was highly respected for efforts to distribute food aid to the needy.

On 9 July 1989 he was assassinated in Mogadishu by a shooter. While the identity of the killer has never been determined, the Barre regime would immediately lay the blame on Islamic fundamentalists. Following the killing President Barre would announce a five million Somali shilling reward for the arrest of the assassin. The regimes claims was widely called into question by Christian groups, human rights organizations and Somali citizens at the time. There was widespread suspicion that Archbishop Colombo had in fact been assassinated by government forces, as he had been a vocally outspoken critic of the regime. The Somali government claimed that Archbishop Colombo had been killed by a lone gunman. Agence France-Presse reported that other sources asserted the assassination had been a professional hit carried out with a burst of machine gun fire from a Land Cruiser.

=== 13 July 1989 arrest of Sheikhs ===
Several days later on Eid al-Adha 13 July 1989, four prominent religious leaders (Sheikh Ali Ibrahim, Sheikh Ali Yusuf, Sheikh Abdurrahman Ali Suufi, and Sheikh Ahmed Gabeyre) were arrested by the government along with 18 other men. This action is believed to have been a major catalyst for the violence that erupted in the city on 14 July. The decision to detain the Sheikhs sparked outrage among the Muslim community and is believed to have contributed to the escalation of violence that followed.

The incident had reportedly been orchestrated by President Siad Barres’ son, General Maslah Mohammed Barre.

== Mogadishu riot ==
=== 14 July 1989 Friday prayer massacre and riots ===
==== Sheikh Ali Suufi Mosque shooting ====
On the day following the arrests, during Friday prayers at the Sheikh Ali Suufi mosque in Hodan District, an Imam named Abdirashid Ali Suufi delivered a sermon condemning the regime. In response, government troops surrounded the mosque midway through the address. Upon completing their prayers at around 1:00 pm, people began to exit the mosque to the sight of a large cordon of armed government forces. Some in the crowd began shouting "Allahu Akbar" (God is great) while walking down Maka al-Mukarama Street. Stones were thrown at security forces and the latter responded with heavy machine gunfire into the crowd. Though according to some sources, the troops had arrived to arrest the imam and had opened fire when members of the congregation resisted. Somali ambassador to the United Kingdom Ahmed Jama Abdallah had claimed that the incident had begun with a peaceful demonstration from the mosque which had then escalated when many other citizens began joining the crowd and throwing stones. He further asserted that the incident had escalated into bloodshed because elements associated with "certain political movements" turned the demonstration violent, but noted that by no means were the agitators related to Islamic extremism.

The mosque reported to be heavily damaged by government forces.

==== Riot begins ====
News of the shooting at Sheikh Ali Suufi mosque would lead to riots breaking out throughout Mogadishu. After hours of fighting, these would be ultimately suppressed by government at the cost of hundreds of civilian casualties. In a bid to halt the escalating violence a curfew was imposed on the capital at 5pm and troops promptly shot those who broke it, killing many. As a result, clashes between citizens and government troops escalated further. The rioting was the worst disturbance Mogadishu had experienced and was a precursor to the major fighting that occurred in 1991. Agence France-Presse would report that witnesses had seen two children being essentially decapitated by machine gun fire from military forces. It was further reported that the curfew had been used by government forces to collect the bodies of those killed during the main violence. When relatives of the deceased had attempted to collect recover the bodies, the Red Berets had them summarily executed.

=== Government raids and detentions ===
Witnesses claimed that soldiers searched homes all over the city during the night of the riots, detaining men, committing rape, and plundering. Almost 2,000 people were detained during these searches. Consistent gunfire was reported to be heard throughout the night, only becoming sporadic in the afternoon of the next day. President Siad Barre would address the nation on radio about the violence that same afternoon:

Mogadishu Domestic Service in Somali 1713 GMT 15 July 1989:

"In the name of God, the compassionate and merciful: Comrades, yesterday there was a problem. Some people died in riots. We pray for their souls to rest in peace and for their relatives to be patient. We hope that inasmuch as the events were confined to a small area, there will be no more problems. Meanwhile the Somali people should remain vigilant and not allow themselves to be worried by such insignificant noises...Stay out of this problem in a pure, stable patriotic and Islamic manner. Officers of the Armed Forces and security forces must guard against harming the innocent. I repeat: All culprits must be taken to court and innocent people left alone. I hope everything is as it should and that the situation cools down."

== The Jazeera Beach Massacre ==
The Jazeera Beach Massacre, was a mass execution that took place on 15 July 1989, the day after the main violence. According to eyewitness accounts, government troops known as the Red Berets rounded up approximately 48 Isaaq men at random and drove them in trucks to Jazeera Beach, located 20 miles south of Mogadishu. The Red Berets ordered the handcuffed prisoners into a sandy gorge and fired point blank into them. A young Isaaq man who survived the executions by pretending to be dead and later escaping to the neighboring country of Djibouti was the sole survivor of the massacre. The massacre was a highly publicized and controversial event that further fuelled tensions in Somalia and contributed to the onset of the Somali Civil War.

== Casualties ==
Africa Watch, a human rights organization, reported that approximately 400 individuals were killed and over 1,000 were injured during the events, but many were hesitant to seek medical treatment due to fear of arrest. The government stated that only 23 individuals were killed and 59 were injured, blaming the violence on "troublemakers" and further dismissed reports of around 400 deaths as sensational propaganda.

The Somali National Movement (SNM) would accuse the government of killing approximately 1,500 and injuring over 2,500 in the violence.

== Aftermath ==
On 24 July 1989 the Ministry of Information publicly announced on radio that the situation in Mogadishu had returned to normal. Following the eruption of violence, Italians living in Somalia began an exodus from the country.

=== International fallout ===
The July massacres had significant consequences for the Barre regime and its foreign relations with the United States, which had previously been its principal source of financial and military support. Human rights organizations condemned the violence and accused the U.S. of complicity. In response, the Bush administration withdrew its request for more than $20 million in emergency economic support for the Somali government and began distancing itself from President Siad Barre. The size of the American embassy in Somalia was also significantly reduced, going from 189 to 85 employees.

=== Repercussions and complicity of Siad Barre ===
No one in the Somali government was ever prosecuted in connection with the killing of Archbishop Colombo, or with either the Mogadishu or Jazeera Beach massacres. It is widely believed that the Red Berets, a unit of around 5,000 troops led by the son of President Siad Barre, were responsible for the majority of the killings. Despite this, many analysts have agreed that it was unlikely that President Barre himself directly ordered the attacks and that the violence instead highlighted the lack of control over his military forces.

=== Intensification of opposition towards the regime ===
The July 1989 massacres played a significant role in inflaming rebellion against the Somali government. In response to the killings, a group of civilian politicians, intellectuals, businessmen, and religious leaders representing a large coalition of Somali clans formed the Council for National Reconciliation and Salvation (CNRS). The goal of the council was to peacefully introduce democratic reforms and call for Siad Barre to peacefully relinquish power, the establishment of an interim government consisting of representatives from opposition movements, and a timetable for multiparty elections. While the CNRS received support from countries such as Egypt and Italy, efforts ultimately proved unsuccessful due to a lack of willingness to negotiate on the part of the Siad Barre regime.
