= Catholic Church in Somalia =

The Catholic Church in Somalia is part of the worldwide Catholic Church, under the spiritual leadership of the Pope in Rome.

== Overview ==
There are very few Catholics in Somalia, with only about one hundred practitioners, and one priest, as of 2020.

The whole of the country forms a single diocese, the Diocese of Mogadishu. During the pre-independence period, there were, at its peak in 1950, 8,500 Catholics in the Diocese of Mogadishu (0.7% of the nation's population), almost all of whom were expatriate Italians.

== History ==
Catholicism was introduced in Italian Somaliland in the late 19th century. Initially, it was only practiced by the few Italian immigrants in Mogadishu and the Shebelle River farmer areas, thanks to some missionaries of the Trinitarian Fathers.

In 1895, the first 45 Bantu slaves were freed by the Italian colonial authorities under the administration of the chartered Catholic company Filonardi. The former were later converted to Catholicism. Massive emancipation and conversion of slaves in Somalia only began after the anti-slavery activist Luigi Robecchi Bricchetti informed the Italian public about the local slave trade and the indifferent attitude of the Italian colonial government toward it.

After obtaining Jubaland from the British, the Italian colonial administration gave land to Italian settlers for the production of cash crops that would then be exported to Italy. Requiring labor to work these plantations, the Italian authorities attempted to recruit Bantu ex-slaves, singling out the latter community for this purpose. However, the Italians soon also had to resort to forced labor (essentially slavery) when they found that volunteers, many of whom found it more profitable to work as free yeoman, were not forthcoming. This forced labor came from the Bantu populations that were settled along the Shebelle River, and not from the nomadic Somalis.

Slavery in southern Somalia lasted until early into the 20th century, when it was finally abolished by the Italian authorities in accordance with the Belgium protocol and with the Diocese of Mogadishu.

After World War I, many Bantus, the descendants of former slaves, became Catholics. They were principally concentrated in the Villaggio Duca degli Abruzzi and Genale plantations.

In 1928, a Catholic cathedral was built in Mogadishu by order of Cesare Maria De Vecchi, a Catholic governor who promoted the Christianization of Somali people. The cathedral, the biggest in Africa in the 1920s and 1930s, was later destroyed during the Somali Civil War.

The Bishop of Mogadishu, Franco Filippini, declared in 1940 that there were about 40,000 Somali Catholics due to the work of missionaries in the rural regions of Juba and Shebelle, but WWII damaged them irreversibly. Most members were Somali Bantu, but some thousands were illegitimate sons of Italian soldiers and Somali girls (who received Italian citizenship when baptized).

In the 1950s Indro Montanelli wrote in Il Borghese that Italian Mogadishu in 1942 after the arrival of the British was an African capital where most of inhabitants were Catholics: he indicated that of the 90,000 inhabitants, more than 40,000 were Italians, while among the 50,000 Somalis there were nearly 7,000 Catholics. From this, he concluded that nearly 3 out of 5 city inhabitants were Catholics.

Since the end of the colonial period and the departure of the Italians, Catholicism has experienced a nearly complete disappearance in Somalia. In 2023, the country was scored zero out of 4 for religious freedom. In the same year, the country was ranked as the second worst place in the world to be a Christian, just behind North Korea.

== See also ==
- Christianity in Somalia
- Freedom of religion in Somalia
- Catholic Church in Somaliland
- Italian Somalis
- Roman Catholic Diocese of Mogadishu

== Bibliography ==
- Ceci, Lucia. Il Vessillo e la Croce - Colonialismo, missioni cattoliche e islam in Somalia (1903-1924)Carocci editore. Roma, 2006 ISBN 978-88-430-4050-6 ()
- Gresleri, G. Mogadiscio ed il Paese dei Somali: una identita negata. Marsilio editori. Venezia, 1993
- Tripodi, Paolo. The Colonial Legacy in Somalia. St. Martin's Press. New York, 1999.
