= Apostolic Vicariate of Harar =

Catholic missionary jurisdiction in Ethiopia

Apostolic Vicariate of Harar Vicariatus Apostolicus Hararensis

Location
- Country: Ethiopia
- Metropolitan: Immediately subject to the Holy See

Statistics
- Area: 260,000 km^{2} (100,000 sq mi)
- Population: Total; Catholics: (as of 2014); 6,453,000; 21,510 (0.3%)

Information
- Rite: Latin Rite
- Cathedral: Pro-Cathedral of The Holy Name of Mary

Current leadership
- Bishop: Angelo Pagano, OFMCap
- Bishops emeritus: Woldetensaé Ghebreghiorghis, OFM Cap

Map
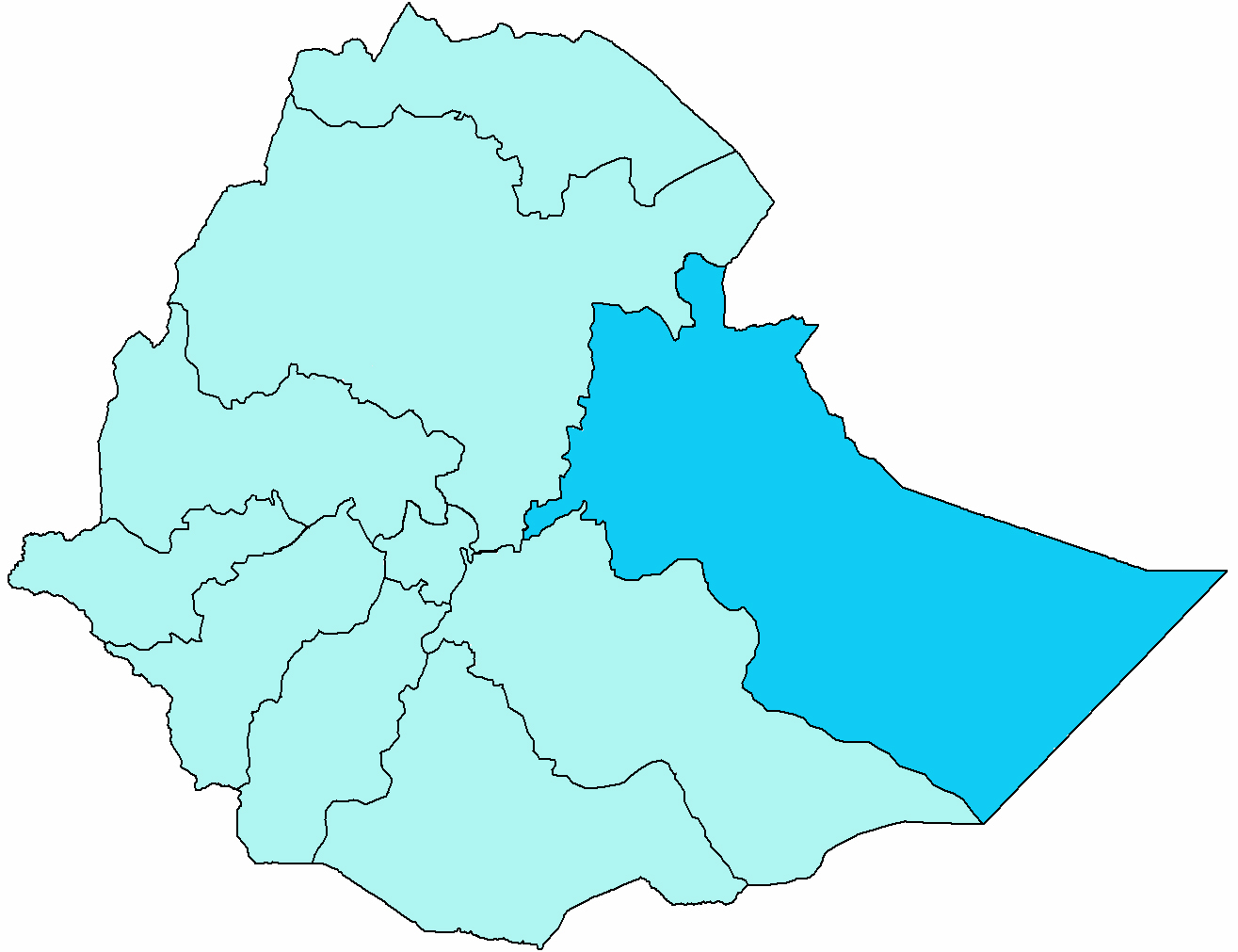

The Apostolic Vicariate of Harar (Latin: Vicariatus Apostolicus Hararensis) is a Roman Catholic apostolic vicariate located in the city of Harar in Ethiopia.

The Vicariate Apostolic of Harar comprises East and West Hararghe zones and Fentale and Boset woredas of East Shewa in Oromiya Region; Harari Region Provisional Administration of Dire Dawa; Somali Region with exception of Afder and Liben Zones; Amibara worda of Afar Region

== History ==
- May 4, 1846: Established as the Apostolic Vicariate of Galla from the Apostolic Prefecture of Abyssinia
- March 25, 1937: Renamed as Apostolic Vicariate of Harar

== Bishops ==
=== Ordinaries ===
- Vicars Apostolic of Galla (Roman Rite)
  - Bishop Guglielmo Massaia, OFMCap (May 12, 1846 – August 1880), resigned; future titular archbishop and Cardinal
  - Bishop Louis-Taurin Cahagne (August 1880 – September 1, 1899)
- Vicar Apostolics of Harar (Roman rite)
  - Bishop André-Marie-Elie Jarosseau, OFMCap (April 6, 1900 – September 2, 1937)
  - Bishop Leone Giacomo Ossola, OFMCap (September 22, 1937 – October 19, 1943), appointed Apostolic Administrator of Novara, Italy; future titular archbishop
  - Fr. Urbain-Marie Person, OFMCap (Apostolic Administrator 1952 – July 3, 1955); see below
  - Bishop Urbain-Marie Person, OFMCap (July 3, 1955 – December 4, 1981): see above
  - Fr. Georges Perron, OFMCap (Apostolic Administrator 1982 – November 21, 1992), appointed Bishop of Djibouti
  - Fr. Woldetensaé Ghebreghiorghis, OFMCap (Apostolic Administrator 1987 – December 21, 1992); see below
  - Bishop Woldetensaé Ghebreghiorghis, OFMCap (December 21, 1992 – April 16, 2016); see above
  - Bishop Angelo Pagano, OFMCap (April 16, 2016 – Present)

=== Coadjutor Vicars Apostolic ===
- Louis-Taurin Cahagne, OFMCap (1873-1880)
- Felicissimo Coccino (Cocchino), OFMCap (1855-1873), did not succeed to see
- Giusto da Urbino, OFMCap (1855), did not take effect
- Louis-Callixte Lasserre, OFMCap(1881-1886), did not succeed to see; appointed Prefect of Aden, Yemen
