= Giorgio Bertin =

Italian bishop

The Most Reverend Giorgio Bertin OFM
- Bishop of Djibouti, Apostolic Administrator of Hargeisa
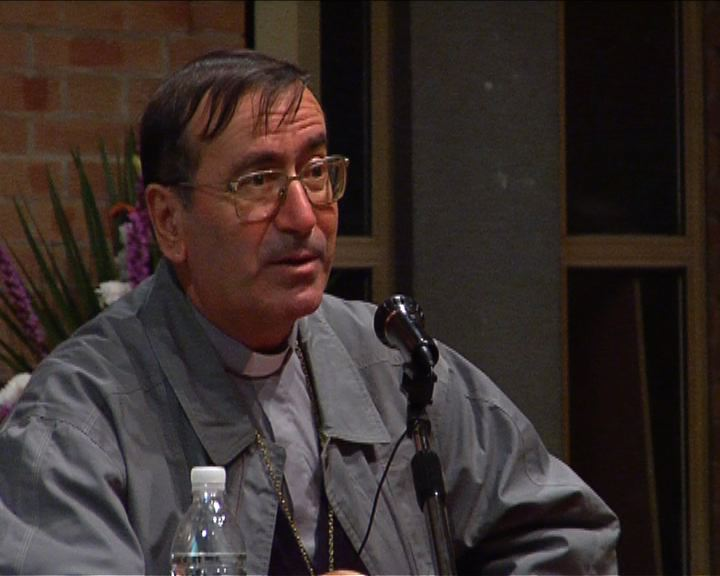
- Bishop Bertin in 2010

Orders
- Ordination: 7 June 1975
- Consecration: 25 May 2001 by Silvano Maria Tomasi

Personal details
- Born: 28 December 1946 (age 79) Galzignano Terme, Veneto, Kingdom of Italy
- Education: Pontifical Athenaeum Antonianum (STL); Pontifical Institute of Arab and Islamic Studies (Lic.)

Giorgio Bertin OFM (born 28 December 1946) is an Italian Catholic prelate who served as Bishop of Djibouti between 2001 and 2024 and Apostolic Administrator of the Diocese of Mogadishu between 1990 and 2024. He is a member of the Order of Friars Minor.

== Early life ==
Bertin was born on 28 December 1946 in Galzignano Terme, Veneto in the Kingdom of Italy. He entered the Order of Friars Minor on 10 September 1967, joining their Province of Saint Charles Borromeo. He completed his high school studies in Milan and then obtained Bachelor of Sacred Theology degree. He professed his solemn vows in 1972 and was ordained a priest on 7 June 1975.

Bertin later earned a Licentiate of Sacred Theology from the Pontifical Athenaeum Antonianum, a Diploma in Arab language and culture from the Italian Institute for the Middle and Far East, a brevet d'Arabe Littéral from the Institut d'Etudes Islamiques. He studied at the Pontifical Institute of Arab and Islamic Studies from 1975 to 1977 and earned a Licentiate in Arabic and Islamic Studies.

== Missionary in Africa ==
Bertin became a missionary to Somalia and was assigned as a parish priest at the Mogadishu Cathedral from 1978 to 1983. From 1978 to 1985, he was also the director Caritas in Mogadishu, and from 1985 to 1988, he was the director of Caritas Somalia. In 1984, Bertin became the vicar general of the Diocese of Mogadishu, holding this position until 1989. He was a professor of Latin at the Consular Italian School in Mogadishu from 1986 to 1989, and from 1989 to 1990, he was the president of Caritas Somalia.

Bertin became the diocesan administrator of the Diocese of Mogadishu in 1989. Following the assassination of the Bishop of Mogadishu, Salvatore Colombo, in 1991, Bertin was made the apostolic administrator of the diocese.

Bertin was appointed the Bishop of Djibouti by Pope John Paul II on 4 April 2001.

Catholic Church titles
| Preceded by Salvatore Colombo as Bishop of Mogadishu | Apostolic Administrator of the Diocese of Mogadishu; 1990–present | Incumbent |
| Preceded by Georges Perron | 4th Bishop of Djibouti; 2001–present | Incumbent |
