= Religion in Puntland =

Religion in Puntland denotes the religions that are, or have been, practised within the territory of Puntland, a semi-autonomous state that is a federal member state of Somalia. It also includes religiosity as practised in neighboring North East State of Somalia (Waqooyi Bari), since the former regards itself as having territorial jurisdiction over the latter.

== Islam ==
The main religion of Puntland is Islam. All the inhabitants of the region are Sunni Muslims. Puntland's state constitution states that "Islam shall be the only religion of Puntland State of Somalia. No any other religion can be propagated in Puntland State, while the Islamic Religion and the traditions of the people of Puntland are the bases of law." Also, Muslims in Puntland are not allowed to renounce their religion. Furthermore, the constitution of Puntland restricts the formation of political parties based on a particular faith, religious beliefs, or interpretations of religious doctrine.

== Other religions ==
The non-Muslim population primarily consists of either foreign-born national workers or guest workers associated with the port facilities in Gara'ad and Bosaso ports and others, particularly via ports that have logistics affiliated with the UAE. For Vedic religions, this includes Hindus and Buddhists. There are also religiously unaffiliated people such as agnostics and deists. For the Abrahamic religions, these include Roman Catholics, Protestant Christians, and Greek Orthodox adherents as well as Baha'is. However, the population of Christians in Puntland has historically and to this day been minuscule, and the Ethiopian diplomat Peter Gabriel Robleh is one of the rare few people with loose ties to Puntland who has been recorded as being of Christian faith.

== See also ==
- Christianity in Djibouti
