= Salvatore Colombo =

Catholic bishop of Mogadishu (1922–1989)

The Most Reverend Pietro Salvatore Monsignor Colombo O.F.M.
- Monsignor; Bishop of Mogadiscio, Somalia
- Church: Roman Catholic Church
- Archdiocese: Roman Catholic Diocese of Mogadiscio
- Province: Somalia
- Metropolis: Somalia
- See: Subject to the Holy See
- Elected: 20 November 1975
- In office: 9 July 1989
- Successor: Bishop Giorgio Bertin, OFM

Orders
- Ordination: 6 April 1946 by Bishop Alfredo Ildefonso Schuster
- Consecration: 23 May 1968 by Bishop Giovanni Colombo
- Rank: Bishop-Priest

Personal details
- Born: Pietro Salvatore Colombo; 28 October 1922 Carate Brianza, Province of Monza and Brianza, Lombardy
- Died: 9 July 1989 (aged 66) Mogadishu, Somalia
- Buried: Mogadishu Cathedral^{(Original)} Basilica of Saint Anthony of Padua^{(Current)} 2.0358°N 45.3416°E^{(Original)}45.4014°N 11.8808°E^{(Current)}
- Denomination: Roman Catholic
- Residence: Somalia
- Education: St.Anthony's Convent of Franciscan Friars

Pietro Salvatore Colombo, OFM (28 October 1922 – 9 July 1989) was an Italian Catholic prelate who served as Bishop of Mogadiscio from 1976 until his assassination in 1989. He was a member of the Order of Friars Minor.

== Biography ==
Colombo was born in Carate Brianza, near Milan. He served the people of Somalia from 1946, after he had been ordained a priest in Milan, Italy. He was appointed as the first Bishop of Mogadishu in 1975, and consecrated on 16 March 1976.

Colombo was well regarded by non-Catholics, whether Muslim or secular. Colombo was known for his pragmatic oversight of aid projects, making sure that aid projects could operate after the foreign aid workers went home. The government of President Siad Barre did not tolerate proselytizing, but was comfortable with the humanitarian aid dispensed by the Church.

Colombo was killed in the Mogadishu Cathedral by an unknown assassin. Barre blamed radical Islamists and offered a bounty for their capture. But many people believed that Barre had ordered the assassination, perhaps because Colombo had been critical of the Barre regime or perhaps because Barre wanted a scapegoat which would increase military and other aid from Western governments, or perhaps because Colombo had helped a clan which was out of favor with Barre purchase some land. To this day, the controversy of who killed Colombo persists although his murder is seen as a turning point for Islamic/secular relations because of the severe crackdown by Barre in response to the murder.

== Legacy ==
Four days after Colombo's death, several Somali sheikhs and other men were arrested on suspicion of having a connection to the assassination. The next day, on 14 July 1989, government forces massacred those leaving the Sheik Ali Suufi Mosque after the imam gave sermon denouncing the government. News of this resulted in civilian riots against government forces.

No bishop has been appointed for Mogadishu since Colombo's death. Currently, the welfare of Catholics in Somalia is overseen by the Apostolic Administrator of Mogadishu, Jamal Khader Daibes, the Bishop of Djibouti.

== See also ==
- Italian Somalis
- Mogadishu riots of July 1989

== Footnotes ==
Catholic Church titles
Preceded by Antonio Silvio Zocchetta as Vicar Apostolic	Bishop of Mogadiscio; 1975 – 1989	Succeeded by Giorgio Bertin as Apostolic Administrator
