= Christianity in Djibouti =

Christianity of an Area

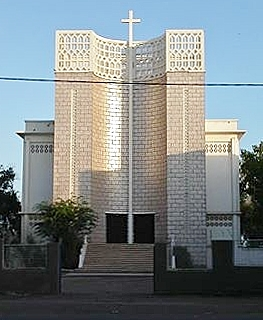
Our Lady of the Good Shepherd Cathedral, Djibouti

Christianity is the religion of 6% (~ 25,000) of the population of Djibouti (923,000 - July 2012 est.). Christians are mostly of Ethiopian and European ancestry. Most Christians are Ethiopian Orthodox or Roman Catholic. The constitution of Djibouti includes freedom of religion, although Islam is the state religion. There is a tolerant attitude between religions in general. Proselytizing by any faith in public is not allowed.

Christianity came into Djibouti during Aksumite rule seems to have included a substantially larger region, including Djibouti.

== Christian denominations ==
3.2% of the population are Orthodox. 0.07% to 1% of the population (about 4,767 persons) are Protestants. According to the World Christian Encyclopedia, among other denominations are the Eglise Protestante de Djibouti and the Greek Orthodox Church The Mennonite Mission is active in Djibouti. The Eglise Protestante Evangelique de Djibouti (known in English as the Protestant Church of Djibouti) was founded in 1960. It is active in the care for refugees, among other things. There is a Djibouti Parish of the New Apostolic Church.

Djibouti is included in the Episcopal Area of the Horn of Africa of the Anglican Diocese of Egypt, though there are no current congregations in the country.

=== Roman Catholicism ===
There were approximately 7,000 Catholics in Djibouti in 2015. By 2020 this had gone down to 5,000, served by 5 priests and 24 nuns. The only Roman Catholic diocese there is the Diocese of Djibouti, divided into five parishes. Just over 1% to 2% of the population are members of the diocese. Djibouti maintains diplomatic relations with the Vatican.

=== Protestantism ===
There are several Protestant denominations in the country, including Reformed, Lutheran, Baptist, Adventist and Mennonite.

== Freedom of religion ==
In 2023, the country was scored 2 out of 4 for religious freedom; Christians can worship but are not allowed to proselytize.

== See also ==
- Islam in Djibouti
- Roman Catholicism in Djibouti
