= List of mosques in Djibouti =

This is a list of mosques in Djibouti.

== List ==
Name	Image	Location	Year (CE)	Group	Notes
Korijib Masjid		Tadjoura	630–640		Possibly the oldest mosque in Djibouti
Hamoudi Mosque		Djibouti City	c. 1906	Su	Capacity for 1,000 worshipers; exact date of establishments disputed.
Al Sada Mosque		Djibouti City	1912		
Abdülhamid II Mosque		Djibouti City	2019		Capacity for 6,000 worshipers; the largest mosque in the country.
Salman Mosque		Djibouti City			

== See also ==
- Islam in Djibouti
- List of mosques in Africa
