= Hamoudi =

Hamoudi is a surname. Notable people with the surname include:

- Ahmed Hamoudi (born 1990), Egyptian footballer
- Ali Hamoudi (born 1986), Iranian footballer
- Humam Hamoudi (born 1956), Iraqi politician
- Mona Hamoudi (born 1993), Iranian footballer

== See also ==
- Hamoudi Mosque, mosque in Djibouti City, Djibouti
