= Salman Mosque =

Mosque in Djibouti City, Djibouti

- مسجد سلمان
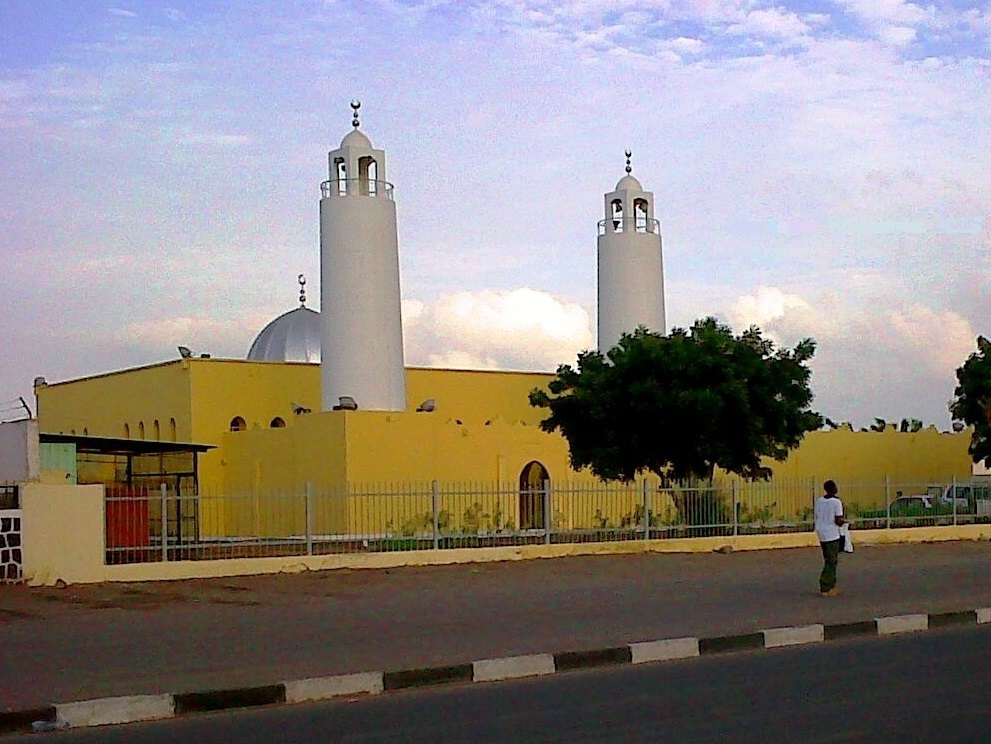

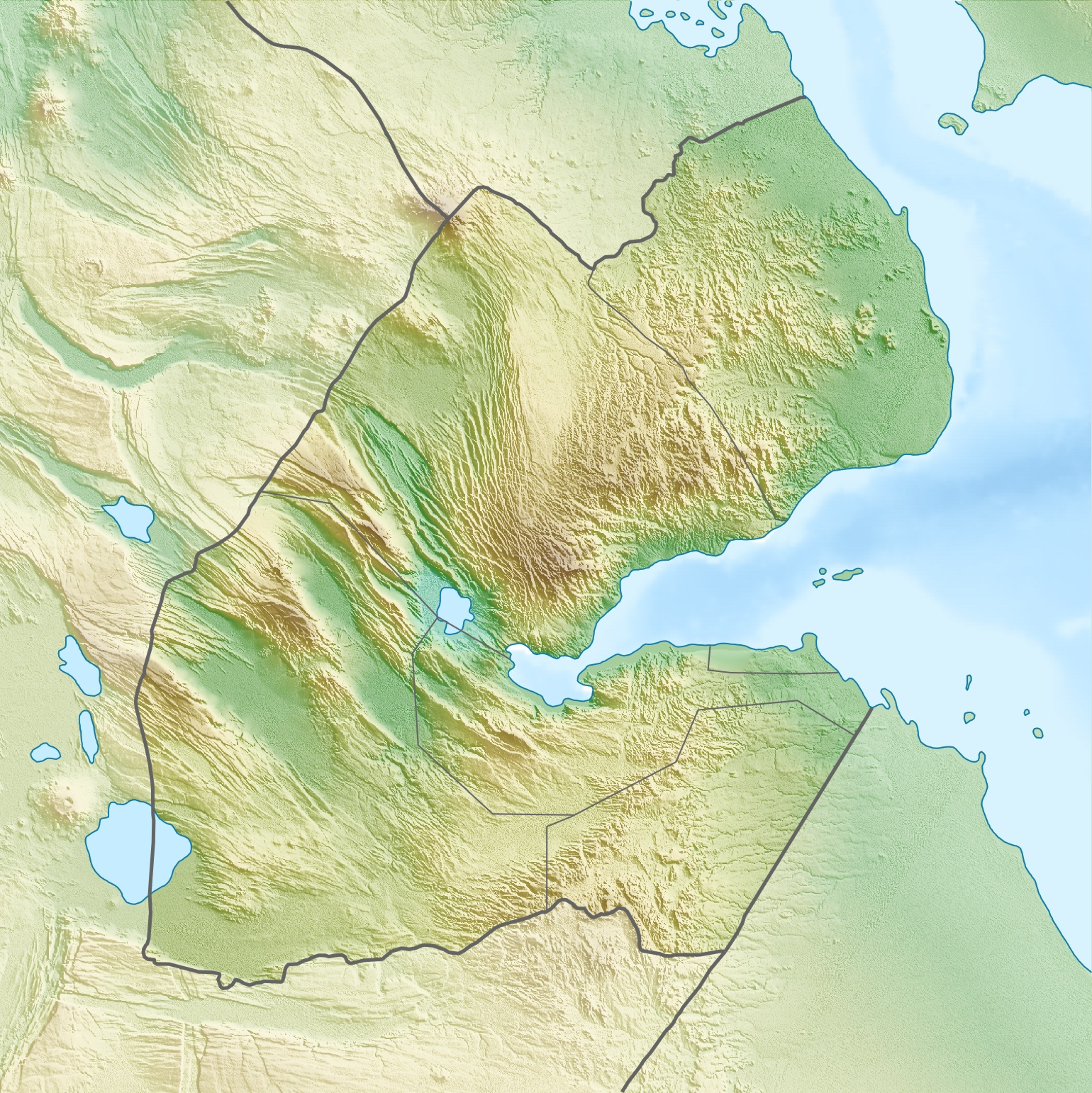
- Location within Djibouti

Religion
- Affiliation: Islam
- Ecclesiastical or organizational status: Mosque
- Status: Active

Location
- Location: Djibouti City
- Country: Djibouti
- Interactive map of Salman Mosque
- Coordinates: 11°34′09″N 43°09′12″E

Architecture
- Type: Mosque
- Style: Abbasid

Specifications
- Capacity: 1,500 worshippers
- Minaret: 2

Amin Salman Mosque (Arabic: مسجد سلمان) is a mosque in Djibouti City, Djibouti.

The Salman Mosque has the capacity to accommodate up to 1,500 worshippers.

== See also ==
- List of mosques in Djibouti
- Islam in Djibouti
