= Evangelical Protestant Church of Djibouti =

The Evangelical Protestant Church of Djibouti (French: Église protestante évangélique de Djibouti) is a Reformed Christian Church in Djibouti. It was established in 1960 by the army chaplains of French troops. The temple was inaugurated in 1962 and renovated in 2017. The single parish developed rapidly, regular worship lives and Bible schools were created, and they supported refugee work. The church works with Christians from several countries including Congo, Burundi, France and the US.

== See also ==
- Christianity in Djibouti
- Roman Catholicism in Djibouti
