= Al Sada Mosque =

Mosque in Djibouti City, Djibouti

- مسجد السادة
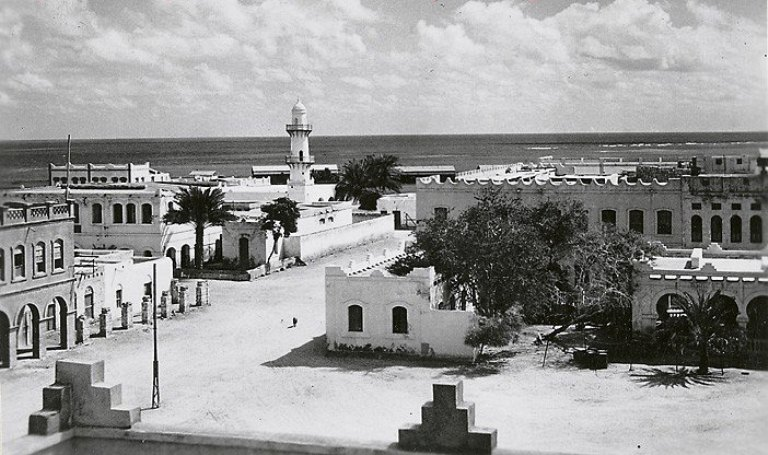
- View of the mosque in the 1940s

Religion
- Affiliation: Islam
- Ecclesiastical or organisational status: Mosque
- Status: Active

Location
- Location: Djibouti City
- Country: Djibouti

Architecture
- Type: Mosque
- Style: Abbasid
- Completed: 1912
- Minaret: 1

The Al Sada Mosque (Arabic: مسجد السادة) is a mosque in Djibouti City, Djibouti.

== Capacity ==
Al Sada Mosque has the capacity to accommodate up to 1,500 worshippers.

== See also ==
- Islam in Djibouti
- List of mosques in Djibouti
