= Our Lady of the Good Shepherd Cathedral, Djibouti =

Coordinates: 11.5998°N 43.1502°E

Our Lady of the Good Shepherd Cathedral
- Cathédrale Notre-Dame du Bon-Pasteur de Djibouti
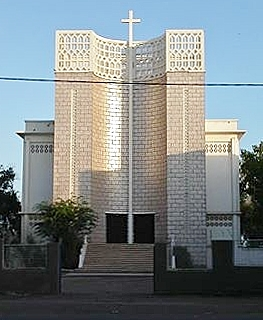
- Our Lady of the Good Shepherd Cathedral
- Location: Djibouti
- Country: Djibouti
- Denomination: Roman Catholic Church

The Our Lady of the Good Shepherd Cathedral (French: Cathédrale Notre-Dame du Bon-Pasteur de Djibouti) or simply Cathedral of Djibouti, is a church built in the second half of the twentieth century. It is the main Catholic church in the Diocese of Djibouti in the African country of Djibouti.

== History ==
The cathedral was built in 1964 under the auspices of Henri Hoffmann, Bishop of Djibouti, on the site where the old church, Sainte-Jeanne-d'Arc, was demolished because of its narrowness, along the Boulevard of the Republic. It is the main church of the city of Djibouti.

It was dedicated on January 12, 1964, by Cardinal Eugène Tisserant, dean of the college of cardinals.

It is under the patronage of Our Lady of Good Shepherd and therein lies the Bishop of Djibouti.

The monolithic architecture of the cathedral belongs to the modern movement. It was designed by Joseph Müller, architect of Colmar (France), and an embodiment of Mr. Calcagnile Bad Gastein (Austria).

== See also ==
- Roman Catholicism in Djibouti
- Church of the Good Shepherd, Beverly Hills
