= Conference of the Latin Bishops of the Arab Regions =

Catholic Episcopal Conference in Middle East, North Africa, East Africa and Cyprus

- Abbreviation: CELRA
- Formation: 1967
- Type: Non-Governmental organization
- Region served: Middle East, East Africa, Egypt and Cyprus
- Members: Active Catholic bishops of the Middle East, parts of East Africa, Egypt and Cyprus
- Vice - President: Pierbattista Pizzaballa
- Main organ: Conference

The Conference of the Latin Bishops of the Arabic Regions (CELRA) (French: Conférence des Evêques Latins dans les Régions Arabes) is an episcopal conference of the Catholic Church which gathers the Latin Church bishops in the Arab States of the Middle East, East Africa, Egypt and Cyprus.

== History ==
The Conference was established on March 31, 1967 by the Congregation for the Evangelization of Peoples, and its statutes were confirmed in 1989.

== Members and bodies ==
They are part of the Conference, the titular bishops, emeritus, assistants and auxiliary staff of the dioceses following:

- Latin Patriarch of Jerusalem (Israel, Palestine, Jordan and Cyprus)
- Archdiocese of Baghdad (Iraq)
- Diocese of Djibouti (Djibouti)
- Diocese of Mogadishu (Somalia)
- Apostolic Vicariate of Aleppo (Syria)
- Apostolic Vicariate of Alexandria (Egypt)
- Apostolic Vicariate of Beirut (Lebanon)
- Apostolic Vicariate of Northern Arabia (Saudi Arabia, Bahrain, Kuwait, and Qatar)
- Apostolic Vicariate of Southern Arabia (United Arab Emirates, Oman, and Yemen)

== List of presidents ==
1965 - 1970: Alberto Gori

1970 - 1987: Giacomo Giuseppe Beltritti

1987 - 2008: Michel Sabbah

2008 - 2016: Fouad Twal

2016–Present: Pierbattista Pizzaballa
