= Hamoudi Mosque =

Mosque in Djibouti City, Djibouti

- مسجد الحمودي (Arabic); Mosquée Hamoudi (French)
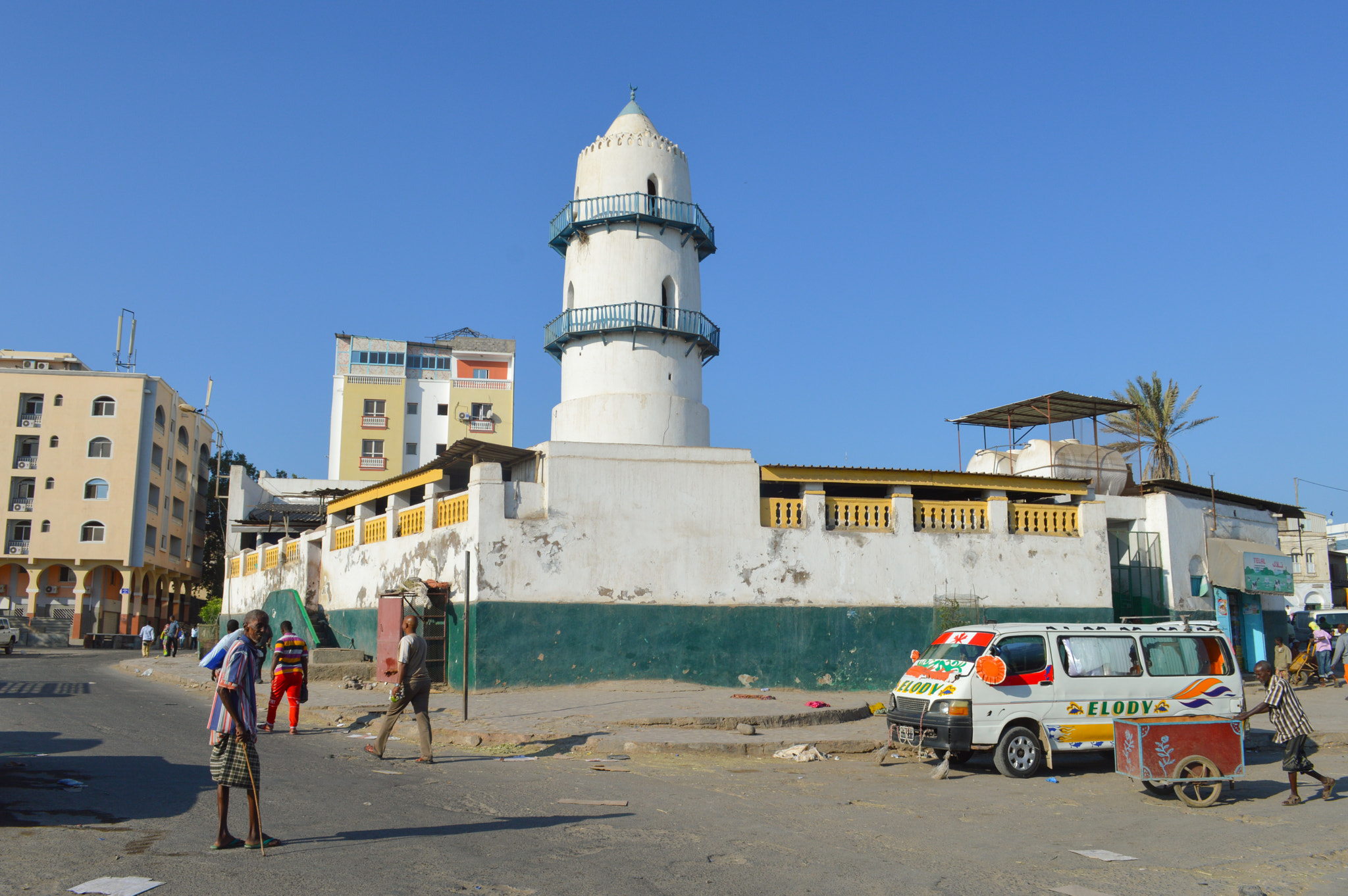

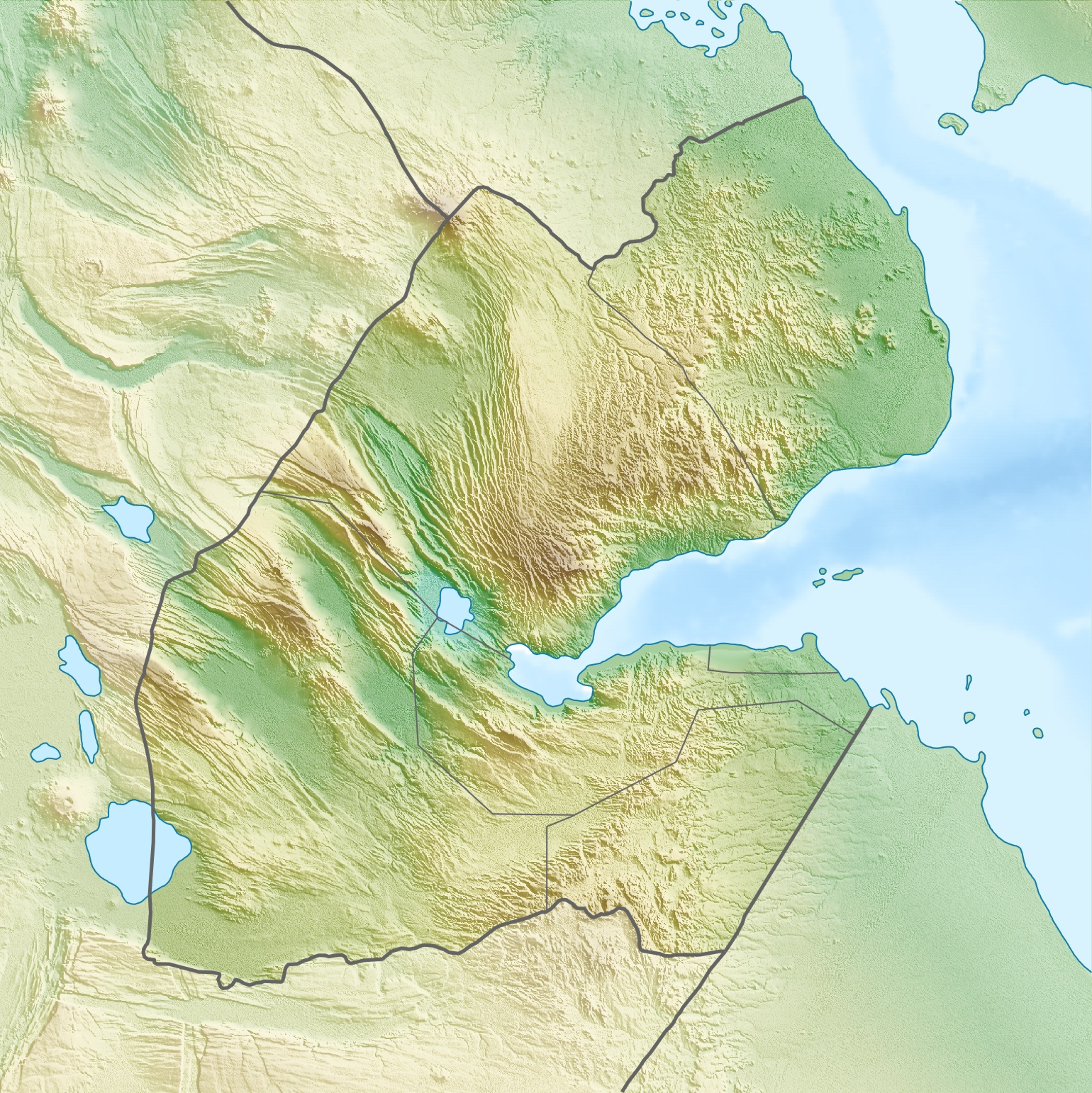
- Location within Djibouti

Religion
- Affiliation: Sunni Islam
- Ecclesiastical or organisational status: Mosque
- Status: Active

Location
- Location: Djibouti City
- Country: Djibouti
- Interactive map of Hamoudi Mosque
- Coordinates: 11°35′32.5″N 43°08′45.9″E

Architecture
- Type: Mosque
- Style: Abbasid
- Completed: 1906

Specifications
- Interior area: 2,000 m^{2} (22,000 sq ft)
- Minaret: 1

The Hamoudi Mosque (Arabic: مسجد الحمودي; French: Mosquée Hamoudi), also known as Gami al-Nur, is a mosque in Djibouti City, Djibouti.

== Overview ==
The mosque was built in c. 1906 by Haji Hamoudi. (Note: Although some records suggest that the mosque was built in 1906 and others say that it was built between 1913 and 1920, there are no reliable sources that specify the actual year that it was built.) It is among the older standing mosques in the capital. With 2,000 square metres (22,000 sq ft) of internal space, the mosque can accommodate up to 1,000 worshippers.

== See also ==
- List of mosques in Djibouti
- Islam in Djibouti
