= Jazeera beach massacre =

1989 massacre during the Isaaq Genocide

Jazeera Beach Massacre
- Part of Isaaq genocide
- Location: 1.944°N 45.159°E; Jazeera Beach, 20 miles south of Mogadishu, Somalia
- Date: 15 July 1989
- Target: Isaaq men
- Attack type: Mass execution
- Weapon: Firearms
- Deaths: 47
- Perpetrator: Somalia

The Jazeera Beach Massacre was a mass execution that occurred on 15 July 1989, the day after the Mogadishu riots of July 1989. Government forces known as the Red Berets rounded up 47 Isaaq men at random in Mogadishu and transported them to Jazeera Beach, 20 miles south of the city. Upon arrival, the men, handcuffed and defenseless, were ordered into a sandy gorge where the soldiers executed them by firing point blank. Only one young man survived by feigning death and later escaped to Djibouti, becoming the sole witness to the massacre.

The massacre was widely condemned internationally, with analysts highlighting its role in escalating the Isaaq genocide and further fueling the Somaliland War of Independence.

== Background ==
During the conflict between the Somali National Movement (SNM) and the Somali government, President Siad Barre launched a brutal counterinsurgency campaign targeting the Isaaq clan. Beginning in May 1988, this campaign escalated into systematic atrocities against Isaaq civilians, with methods including aerial bombardment, mass executions, and the destruction of cities such as Hargeisa and Burco. The campaign aimed to eliminate SNM insurgents but ultimately devolved into what many analysts describe as genocide against the Isaaq population.

In 1987, Barre, frustrated by the SNM's effectiveness, struck a deal with Ethiopia, agreeing to stop supporting rebel movements in each other's territories. This pressured the SNM to shift its operations from the Ethiopia–Somalia border to northern Somalia. In response, Barre's government escalated its attacks, targeting Isaaq civilians indiscriminately. According to Bruce Jentleson, this campaign led to mass killings, widespread destruction, and hundreds of thousands of refugees fleeing to Ethiopia.

The Jazeera Beach Massacre occurred within this context of widespread violence and repression, serving as one of the most infamous examples of the Barre regime's atrocities. It epitomized the regime's willingness to target civilians as part of its broader strategy of annihilation against the Isaaq.

== Legacy ==
The Jazeera Beach Massacre remains a significant event in the collective memory of Somalis and is commemorated annually to honor the victims. It is also frequently cited as evidence of the brutal policies of Siad Barre's government and signifies a range of policies that resulted in a push for the overthrow of his regime.
