= Governor's Palace of Mogadishu =

Governor's Palace
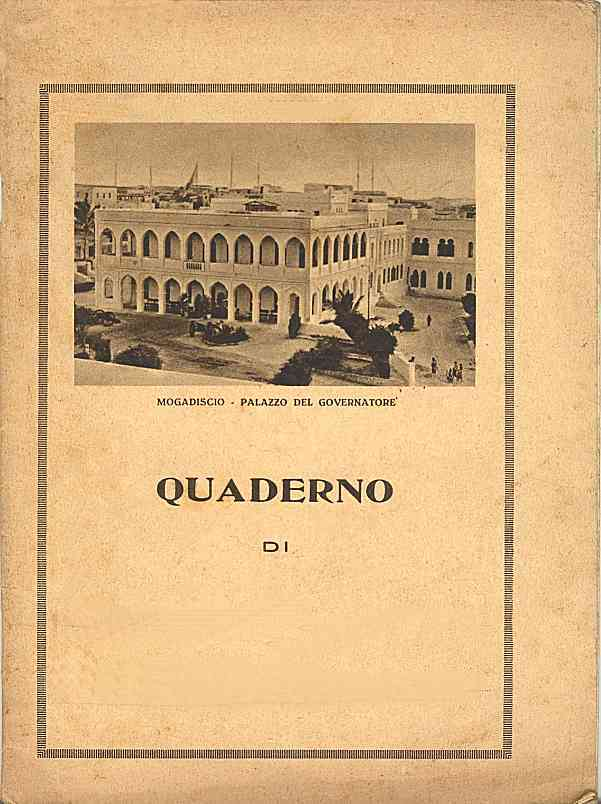
- Interactive map of the Governor's Palace area

General information
- Location: Mogadishu, Somalia
- Coordinates: 2.040833°N 45.335278°E
- Construction started: 1926; 100 years ago
- Completed: 1928; 98 years ago
- Demolished: 1975

The Governor's Palace (Italian: Palazzo del Governatore, Mogadiscio) was the seat of the governor of Italian Somaliland, and then the administrator of the Trust Territory of Somaliland.

== History ==
It was completed in 1928 during the colonial period in the capital city of Mogadishu, situated in present-day southern Somalia. Used as municipality building of Mogadishu, it is one of the most popular government offices in Somalia. It was the first place where the Somali flag waved.

It was demolished in 1975.

== Characteristics ==
It was built during the colonial period (in the late 1920s) in the capital city of Mogadishu, situated in present-day southern Somalia.

In those decades the city was improved with Italian architecture and urbanism: this palace was one of the most representatives of the colonial fascist architecture.

It was located on the "Corso Umberto", the main street of Italian Mogadiscio, and overlooked the ocean & the port.

The architecture is a mixture of Italian and Arab styles, with the second floor decorated with Italian Renaissance furniture. A huge garden was created in front of the main entrance.

In the palace, among other things, there were the following halls in the lower floor:

- Arab hall with decorations, which were derived from the Islamic architecture of the old Mogadishu.
- Rooms of "Queen Elena of Italy" with tapestries.
- "Sala della Giustizia" with furniture in the Gothic style of the Aosta Valley.
- Hall of deliberations, with the wall-scenes taken from the classical style of the Italian architecture and with a huge panel showing "San Giorgio".

The second floor was for private use, with rooms for royal guest.

It was inaugurated by Italian governor Cesare Maria De Vecchi, who ruled from 1923 to 1929. He ordered excavations in the gardens in front of the palace that proved to be the ancient Arab palace of "El Muzaffar".

In 1975 the palace was completely razed to the ground and the site was dedicated to the new construction of the "Al Uruba" (Curuuba) Hotel, a hotel built by Arab subventions, but in the style of "self-helped" Somali constructions.

Since the fall of Siad Barre in 1992 the Curuuba Hotel suffered heavy damages during Somalia civil war from shellings, but in the 2010s there are projects to fully restructure the entire area.

== See also ==
- Italian Somaliland
- Mogadishu Cathedral
- Governor's Palace, Asmara
- Royal Palace of Tripoli
- Villa Somalia
