= Freedom of religion in Somalia =

Overview of religious freedom in Somalia

Current (December 2024) political and military control in ongoing Somali Civil War (2009–present)

Freedom of religion in Somalia refers to the extent to which people in Somalia are freely able to practice their religious beliefs, taking into account government policies, non-state actors, and societal attitudes toward religious groups. Due to the Somali Civil War, the enforcement of laws pertaining to religion by the various autonomous governments in the region is inconsistent.

Sunni Islam is the state religion in Somalia. Generally, the judiciary in most areas relies on xeer (traditional and customary law), sharia, and the penal code. In many regions, activity by Salafi groups further restricts religious freedom, as individuals are afraid of reprisal.

Islam is a core part of Somali national identity. In 1961 Islam was declared the state religion and subsequent governments have maintained this policy. The Somali Democratic Republic, which existed from 1969 to 1991, propagated a combination of Islam and Marxism. Following the collapse of this government, Somalia entered a prolonged civil war which has continued on and off since the 1990s. The official transitional national government has continued to uphold Islam as the state religion, and further established that the Somali legal code is based on principles of Islamic law. The region of Somaliland, which seceded at the outset of the civil war and remained autonomous but internationally unrecognized until 2025, established its own constitution founded on similar religious precepts. Activity by various Islamist insurgent groups further limits religious freedom, as individuals who do not comply with these groups' interpretations of Islamic law are targeted for reprisals.

== Demographics ==
Although Pew Research Center has not conducted a survey in Somalia, its Somali-majority northwestern neighbour Djibouti reported a creed breakdown of Muslims which was reported in 2012 as; 77% adhering to Sunnism, 8% as non-denominational Muslim, 2% as Shia, thirteen percent refusing to answer, and a further report inclusive of Somali Region stipulating 2% adherence to a minority sect (e.g. Ibadism, Quranism etc.). According to the federal Ministry of Religious Affairs, more than 99 percent of the population is Sunni Muslim. In 2022, members of other religious groups combined constitute less than 1 percent of the population and include a small Christian community, and an unknown number of Shia Muslims, as well as Hindus, Buddhists, Jews and some animists.

== History ==
=== Early independence (1960–1969) ===
In 1960, the State of Somaliland gained independence from the United Kingdom, and passed a constitution which largely did not mention religion, although it acknowledged a link between Somali customary law (one of the legal bases of the constitution) and Islamic law. The State of Somaliland merged with the Trust Territory of Somaliland to form the Somali Republic, which ratified a constitution by popular referendum in 1961. This constitution established Islam as the state religion, but nominally accorded religious freedom to all individuals in the country. The constitution further established that Islamic law would be the basis of legislation in the country. A 1963 amendment banned proselytizing for religions other than Islam.

=== Somali Democratic Republic (1969–1991) ===
In 1969, following the assassination of President Abdirashid Shermarke and a coup, the country was renamed the Somali Democratic Republic and the 1961 constitution was suspended. The new regime, led by the Supreme Revolutionary Council, established new foreign policy that emphasized Somalia's religious connections to the Arab world. In 1976, the Supreme Revolutionary Council was disbanded and replaced by the Somali Revolutionary Socialist Party, whose ruling ideology drew on both the Marxism–Leninist principles of scientific socialism and on Islamic law, with Islam remaining as the state religion. Emphasis was placed on Muslim principles of social progress, equality and justice, which the government argued were part and parcel to communism.

=== Civil war ===
Following the collapse of central authority in Somalia in the early 1990s, Islamic courts in Somalia began to assert more power. Somaliland unilaterally declared its independence, and adopted a constitution which established Islam as the state religion, banning the propagation of other faiths, and establishing Islamic law as the basis of the legal code of Somaliland. A 1995 draft constitution officially re-established Sunni Islam as the state religion in Somalia, and subsequent transitional governments passed legal charters which established Islamic law as the basis of Somali legal codes.

In 2006, the Islamic Courts Union seized control of much of the southern parts of Somalia. It was removed from power later that year, and the Transitional Government reasserted control over much of the country with aid from Ethiopian forces. Following its defeat, the Islamic Courts Union splintered into many different groups, including Al-Shabaab. In 2009, in order to contain an ongoing insurgency by Islamist groups, the Transitional Government formed a unified government together with some remaining elements of the Islamic Courts Union. A new provisional constitution granting nominal individual religious freedom and maintaining Islam as the state religion was adopted in 2012.

== Legal framework ==
The provisional constitution of Somalia provides for the right of individuals to practice their religion, makes Islam the state religion, prohibits the propagation of any religion other than Islam (although it does not explicitly ban conversion), and stipulates all laws must comply with the general principles of Muslim religious law. No exemptions from the application of sharia legal principles exist for non-Muslims, although most implementations of Islamic law occur at the regional, as opposed to the national, level. The federal government of Somalia had limited ability to implement its laws beyond greater Mogadishu; most other areas of Somalia were outside its control. The provisional constitution requires the president, but not other office holders, to be Muslim. There are no public places of worship for non-Muslims in the country.

The national penal code generally remains valid in all regions of the country. It does not prohibit conversion from Islam to another religion, but it criminalizes blasphemy and “defamation of Islam,” which carry penalties of up to two years in prison. In 2022, police in Somaliland arrested a local resident on charges of blasphemy, apostasy, insulting Islam and Muhammad on social media, as well as spreading Christianity; she was sentenced to five years in prison and her second appeal scheduled for 2023.

The federal Ministry of Education has the mandate to regulate religious instruction throughout the country. Federal and regional authorities require Islamic instruction in all schools, public or private, except those operated by non-Muslims. Private schools have more leeway to determine their curriculum.

While missionary groups exist in Somalia, they face significant legal and societal barriers to their activities, and often have difficulty carrying out humanitarian aid missions.

== Societal attitudes ==
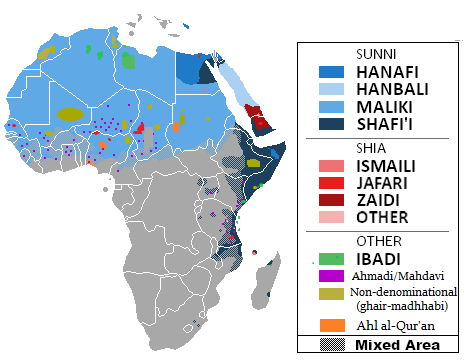
Somali territories mostly colored Prussian blue (Shafi'i Sunni); with some old gold (non-denominational Muslims) and Brandeis blue (Hanafi Sunni).

There is a strong societal pressure to adhere to Sunni traditions. Conversion from Islam to another religion is legal in some parts of Somalia, but is socially unacceptable throughout the country; those suspected of conversion face harassment by members of their community.

== Somaliland ==
The constitution of Somaliland declares Islam as the state religion, prohibits Muslims from converting to another religion, bars the propagation of any religion other than Islam, and require all laws to comply with the general principles of sharia. It also states that "every person shall have the right to freedom of belief and shall not be compelled to adopt another belief". In July 2017, Somaliland authorities closed the only Catholic church in Hargeisa. The Somaliland constitution requires, in addition to Somaliland's president, the candidates for vice president and the House of Representatives to be Muslim.

The Somaliland constitution prohibits the formation of political parties based on a particular religious group, religious beliefs, or interpretation of religious doctrine.

In the past, religious schools and formal places of worship were required to obtain permission to operate from the Ministry of Religious Affairs.

== Puntland ==
in 2017, the constitution of Puntland declared Islam as the state religion, prohibited Muslims from converting to another religion, barred missionary activity, and required all laws to comply with the general principles of sharia. The constitution prohibits any law or culture that contravenes Islam and prohibits demonstrations contrary to Islam. The Puntland constitution requires the president, but not other office holders, to be Muslim. In Puntland, religious schools and formal places of worship must obtain permission to operate from the Ministry of Justice and Religious Affairs.

== Al-Shabaab ==
Al-Shabaab, an al-Qaeda-affiliated militant group in Somalia, has killed, maimed, or harassed persons suspected of converting from Islam or those who failed to adhere to the group's religious edicts. Al-Shabaab was responsible for the killings of civilians, government officials, members of parliament, Somali national armed forces, police, and troops from contributing countries of the African Union Mission to Somalia (AMISOM), with the BBC reporting that 2019 was one of the bloodiest years on record with over 1,200 casualties by October. Al-Shabaab characterizes the AMISOM/ ATMIS peacekeeping forces and workers for humanitarian groups as “Christians” intent on invading and occupying the country.

During 2017, al-Shabaab continued to mandate schools in its area to teach a militant form of jihad emphasizing that students should wage war against those it deemed infidels, including countries in the region, the federal government, and AMISOM. Following the introduction of its new education curriculum in April 2017, al-Shabaab began forcing communities in Hirshabelle and Galmudug to enroll children ages seven to 14 into al-Shabaab-managed madrasas, according to humanitarian groups. Al-Shabaab arrested or fined parents who failed to comply with the directive. According to humanitarian groups, on June 17, al-Shabaab militants in Harardhere arrested 17 elders for refusing to obey the group's edict; days later, the group released 15 of the elders who promised to enroll 50 children. On June 20, al-Shabaab threatened parents in Jowle, Dhalwo, and Tulo-Hajji villages for refusing to enroll persons 10 to 20 years old in the newly opened al-Shabaab-managed madrassahs in Jowle and Xarardhere, according to humanitarian groups. On July 4, humanitarian groups reported that at least 100 elders, imams, and teachers of madrasas not linked to al-Shabaab were arrested within the vicinity of Warshubo, Xarardhere, for resisting al-Shabaab's school enrollment demands. Reports from humanitarian groups indicated that in early July al-Shabaab abducted at least 45 elders in El Buur District for failing to hand over 150 children to the group.

In August 2022, it was reported that they had executed a man for allegedly insulting Muhammad, as well as executing others on spying charges.

Fear of reprisals from al-Shabaab often prevented religious groups from operating freely; however, in 2022, it was noted that violence against aid workers had decreased.

== Other regions ==
The interim governments of Galmudug, Hirshabelle, Jubaland, and South West State of Somalia, have constitutions identifying Islam as the official religion. These constitutions stipulate all laws must comply with the general principles of sharia. In 2017, the constitutions of Galmudug, Hirshabelle, and South West State have not enacted laws directly addressing religious freedom.
