= Christianity in Somalia =

Christianity in Somalia is a minority religion within the country, which has a population mostly Sunni Muslim, and Islam as the state religion. Estimates range on the number of Christians residing in the nation, with the US Department of State reporting there to be approximately 1,000 Christians in 2026.

Some of the modern-day Christian adherents come from the Bantu ethnic minority group, or are descended from Italian colonists and belong to the Swedish Evangelical Mission, Roman Catholic Church, and Church of the Nazarene. There is one Catholic diocese for the entire country, the Diocese of Mogadishu.

Christianity came to coastal areas of the Somalia in early 2nd and 3rd century. Modern day, there are at least some known local Christians in the nation and the self-proclaimed nation of Somaliland in the north.

== History ==
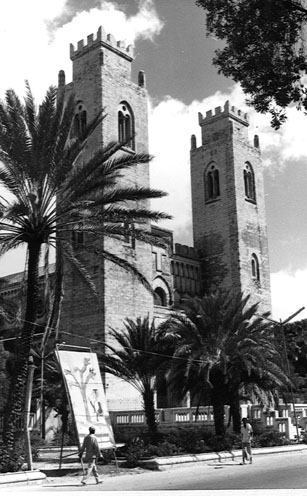
The Mogadishu Cathedral

Due to the proximity of Somalis to the Axumite and Southern Arabian Cultures, early Christianity and Judaism was professed by some in the region of Somalia as can be seen by inscriptions, gravesites with stone crosses, and codices in the Geʽez script.

However, the advent of Islam in the region saw an end to Christianity, not making a return until Italian colonization. In 1903, the first Christian missionaries under the Trinitarian Fathers arrived in Somalia. According to Listowel, they started by providing education and assistance to the poor and sick in the country, with Fr. Jelib founding a leper colony at the mouth of the Jubba River, housing between 350 and 400 afflicted.

Still however at the time of publishing of the Catholic Encyclopedia in 1913, there were virtually no Christians observed in the Somali territories, outside of the around 100–200 followers which existed in the schools and orphanages across the few Catholic missions run by the English, French, and Italians. No Catholic missions are known to have existed in Italian Somaliland during the same period.

In 1928, a Catholic cathedral was built in Mogadishu by order of Cesare Maria De Vecchi, a Catholic governor of "Somalia italiana" who promoted the "Missionari della Consolata" Christianization of Somali people. Upon the completion of the cathedral, it stood as the largest in East Africa until in 2008 when much of it was destroyed due to war.

The Bishop of Mogadishu, Venanzio Francesco Filippini, OFM, declared in 1940 that there were about 40,000 Somali Catholics due to the work of missionaries in the rural regions of Juba and Shebelle, but World War II damaged in an irreversible way most of the Catholic missions in Italian Somalia. Most were Somali Bantu.

The Bible was first translated into Somali only in 1979. The Diocese of Mogadishu estimates that there were about 100 official Roman Catholic practitioners in Somalia in 2004. This was down from a high of 8,500 adherents at the start of the trusteeship period in 1950, under the Prefecture Apostolic of Benadir of the Vicariate Apostolic of Mogadiscio.

Somalia is included in the Episcopal Area of the Horn of Africa of the Anglican Diocese of Egypt, though there are no current local congregations. The Adventist Mission indicates that there are no Adventist members in Somalia, and that Christianity in general has seen little growth there.

In August 2025, International Christian Concern reported that a video posted on TikTok by a Somali about one of its articles went viral, with many people posting extremely violent comments.

== Persecution ==
Due to the ongoing civil war in the southern part of the country, professing Christians in Somalia have faced persecution and sometimes death. Somalia is number three on Open Doors' 2022 World Watch List, an annual ranking of the 50 countries where Christians face the most extreme persecution.

Apart from Mogadishu Cathedral (which is no longer used for Christian services, although in 2013 plans to repair it were announced by the Diocese of Mogadiscio), there are no church buildings in the country. Nor is there any legal protection for Christians, some of whom meet in underground churches.

Paramilitary groups in Somalia have also engaged in widespread looting of Christian graves, in addition to the desecration of Sufi Muslim graves and mosques. Sometimes the term "Christian" was a label that the jihadists would affix on people they suspected of working for Ethiopian intelligence.

In August 2009, International Christian Concern reported that four Christians working to help orphans in Somalia were beheaded by Islamist extremists when they refused to convert to Islam.

In December 2013, the Ministry of Justice and Religious Affairs released a directive prohibiting the celebration of Christian festivities in the country.

In 2023, the country was scored zero out of 4 for religious freedom. In the same year, the country was ranked as the second worst place in the world to be a Christian, just behind North Korea.

== See also ==
- Religion in Somalia
- Freedom of religion in Somalia
- Mogadishu Cathedral
