= Mogadishu Cathedral =

Destroyed cathedral of Somalia

- Cattedrale di Mogadiscio (Italian)
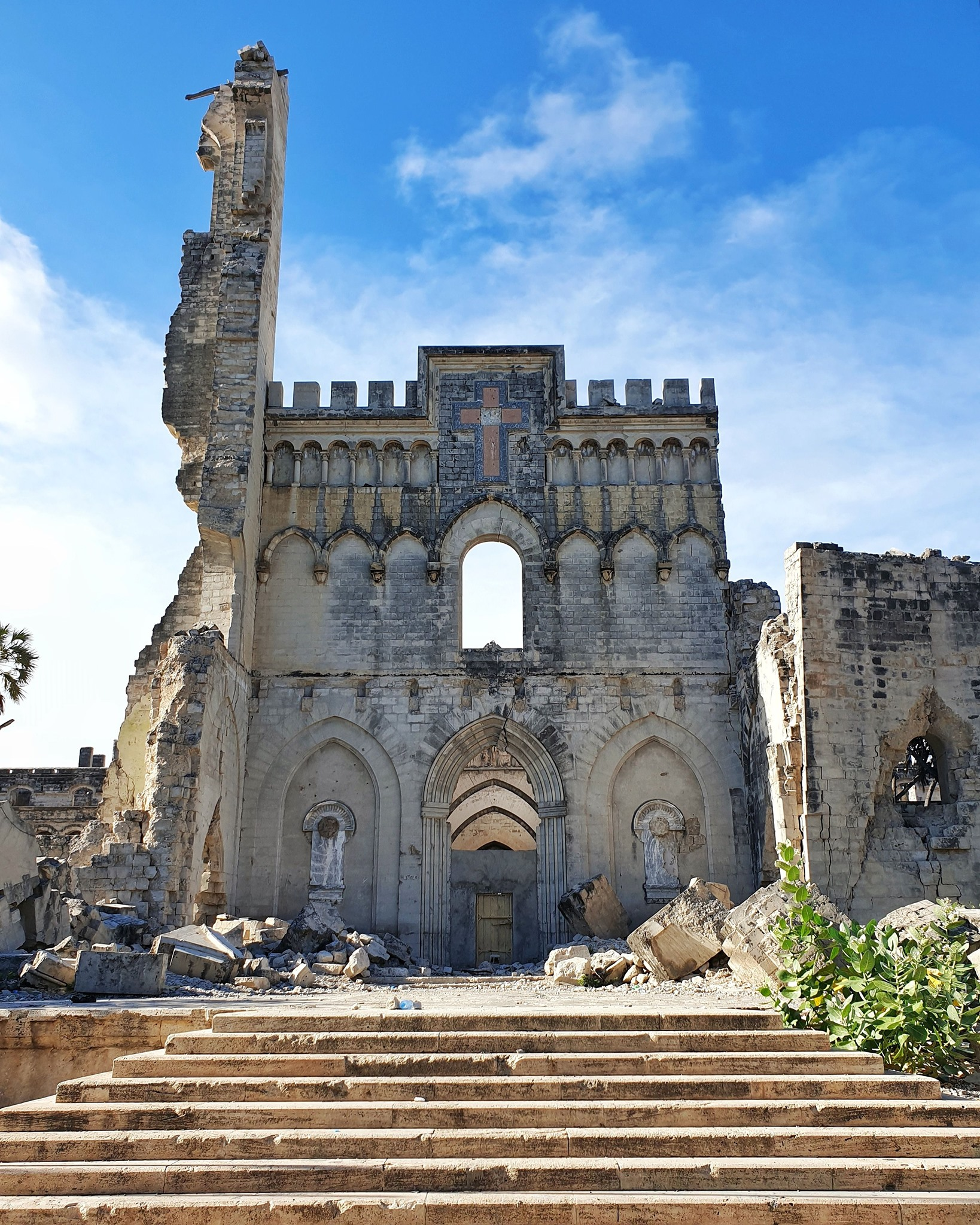
- The ruined Mogadishu Cathedral in 2022
- Mogadishu Cathedral
- 2°02′09″N 45°20′30″E
- Location: Mogadishu
- Country: Somalia
- Denomination: Catholic Church
- Tradition: Latin Church

History
- Status: Cathedral
- Consecrated: 1928

Architecture
- Functional status: Ruined
- Style: Norman Gothic Revival
- Completed: 1928
- Closed: 2008

Administration
- Diocese: Mogadishu

Mogadishu Cathedral (Italian: Cattedrale di Mogadiscio) is a ruined Catholic cathedral located in Mogadishu, Somalia. Between 1928 and 1991, it served as the seat of the Roman Catholic Diocese of Mogadishu. Built in 1928 by Italian colonial authorities, much of the building was destroyed in 2008 by al-Shabaab. In 2013, the diocese announced plans to refurbish the building.

== History ==
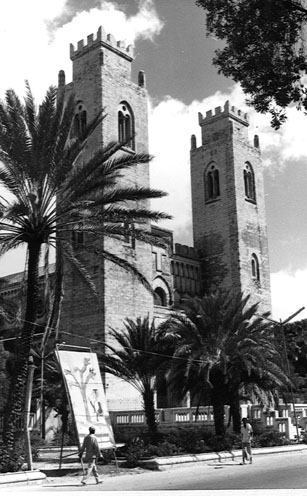
Mogadishu Cathedral before destruction

Mogadishu Cathedral was constructed between 1923 and 1928 by the Italian authorities in the former Italian Somaliland. Known as the Cattedrale di Mogadiscio, it was constructed in a Norman style designed by architect Antonio Vandone, based on the Cathedral of Cefalù in Sicily. The monument deliberately referenced the eleventh-century Norman conquest of Sicily from Islamic rule and capitalized on portrayals of the Normans as tolerant rulers of their Muslim subjects.

The cathedral was the largest in eastern Africa. It was constructed in a central area of the capital not far from the Governor's Palace by order of Cesare Maria De Vecchi, governor of Italian Somaliland who promoted the Christianization of Somali people. The Consolata Missionaries oversaw its construction and maintained the cathedral until they were replaced by the Franciscans (Friars Minor).

The facade was delimited to the sides by two towers, each 37.50 meters high. The plan of the building was a Latin cross; the interior was divided into three naves separated by piers with pointed arches. Elements such as the bell towers and pointed arches can be compared to Islamic architecture, especially in North Africa, and the colonial authorities hoped that these features would complement the cathedral's surroundings and the sensibilities of the local population.

In 1989, on the eve of the outbreak of the Somali Civil War, the last Bishop of Mogadishu, Salvatore Colombo, was killed by armed insurgents while celebrating Mass in the cathedral. The assassination of Bishop Colombo remains unsolved, despite calls from Somali officials for the case's investigation.

== Current situation ==
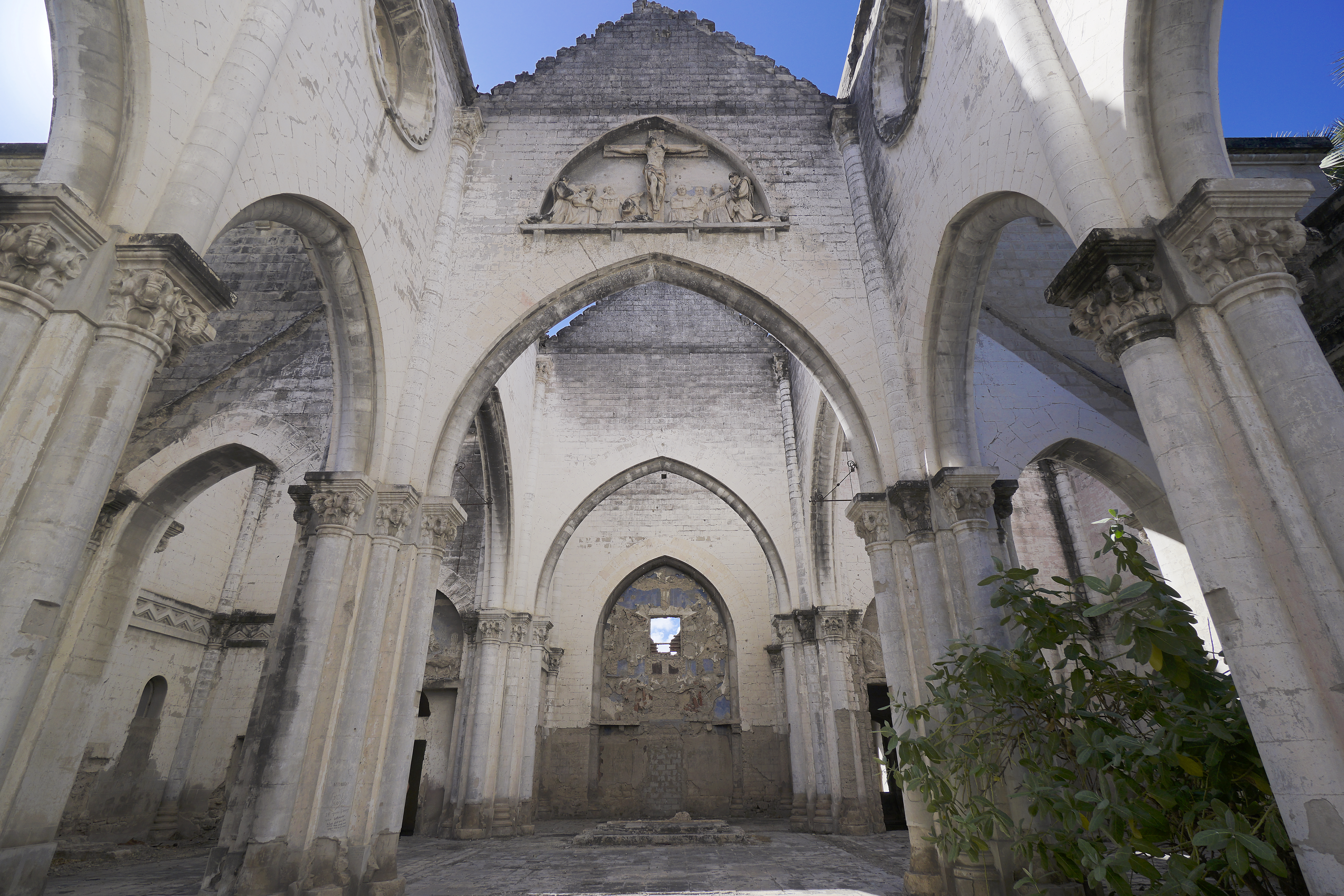
Ruins of the interior of the Mogadishu Cathedral in 2023

After 1991, the cathedral was no longer regularly used. In late 2008, much of the Catholic cathedral was destroyed.

A BBC correspondent later visited the site in 2012 and reported that some internally displaced people had formed tent settlements on the cathedral grounds. This was in stark contrast to the many new shops that had opened outside, where merchants, optimistic about the city's relative stability since the ousting of the insurgents, had begun to publicly advertise their wares again. The correspondent also mentioned that although the cathedral had structurally incurred considerable damage by having its roof blown off among other things, its walls were still erect, its elegant stone arches still in place, and the general atmosphere was one of serenity.

In April 2013, after a visit to the site to inspect its condition, the diocese announced plans to rebuild the cathedral in the near future. As of 2023, reconstruction of the cathedral had yet to commence.

== See also ==
- Catholic Church in Somalia
- Christianity in Somalia

== Bibliography ==
- Guida d'Italia del Touring Club Italiano. - Possedimenti e Colonie, Milano 1929, p. 757.
- D. Paladini. Omicidio a Mogadiscio - L'ultimo vescovo al crepuscolo della Somalia Paoline Editoriale Libri. Roma, 2006
- Claire Dillon. "Transforming Cefalù in Mogadishu: The Arabo-Normanna Cathedral of Italian Somalia and the Façade of 'Peaceful Conquest'." Journal of the Society of Architectural Historians (2025) 84 (3): 368–385. https://doi.org/10.1525/jsah.2025.84.3.368
- “Claire Dillon: ‘Italians Promoted Their Occupation as a Benefit to the Colonized.’” Geeska, 19 Oct. 2025, https://www.geeska.com/en/claire-dillon-italians-promoted-their-occupation-benefit-colonized
