= Jowle =

- Town
- Location in Somalia
- Coordinates: 7°52′15″N 48°40′24″E
- Country: Somalia: Puntland
- Region: Nugal
- Time zone: UTC+3 (EAT)

Jowle is a town in the northeastern Nugal region of Somalia.

A water pump built by Norwegian Church Aid on donation funds raised in the Norwegian TV Auction 2014 is placed in Jowle; the pump, which pumps up clean ground water from 150 meters below ground, was by 2017 sustaining 35,000 people in the otherwise drought-ridden Puntland.
