= Jazeera Beach =

Beach in Somalia

- Xeebta Jasiira
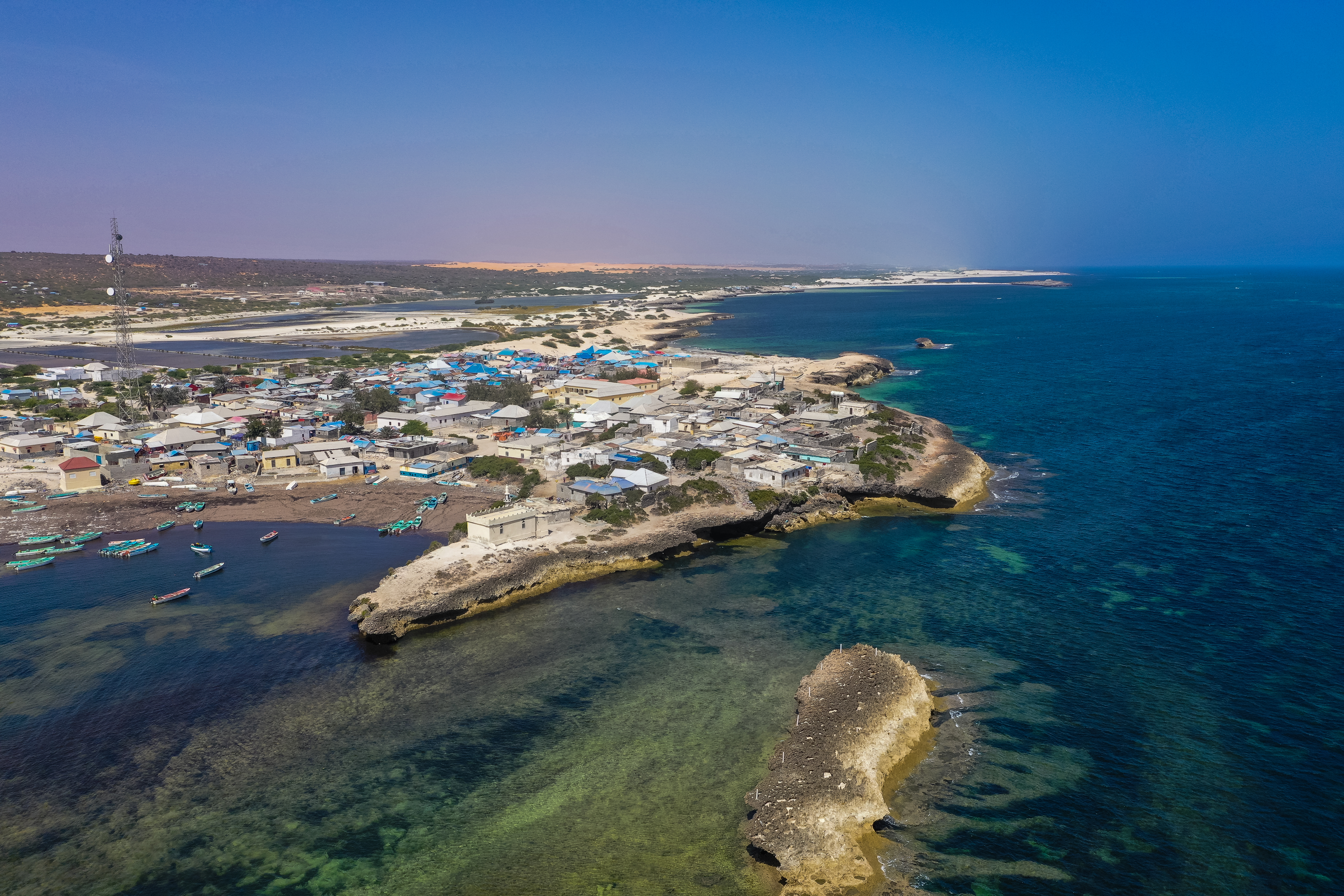

- Location in Somalia.
- Coordinates: 1.94396°N 45.16684°E
- Country: Somalia
- Region: Banaadir
- Time zone: UTC+3 (EAT)

Jazeera Beach (also known as Gezira Beach; Somali: Xeebta Jasiira or Xeebta Jaziira) is a beach which overlooks the Somali Sea near the city of Mogadishu, the capital of Somalia.

The Jazeera beach massacre took place here in 1989.

The beach is now a leisure destination where people gather on weekends as part of Somali seagoing culture. There are hotels, restaurants and leisure boats.

International tourists mostly from Turkey, America, the UK, Italy, Germany, and Malaysia visit Jazeera Beach. The beach offers tourists the chance to see the animal market in Jazeera where camels, cows, goats, sheep and wildlife are sold, as well as the salt mining processes located there. The features of the beach include a small island which can be accessed by tourists by renting a boat.

A dry, hot climate is typical in this eastern African city. Rainy days come rarely to Mogadishu, and the wettest weather occurs from May through August.

The beach has a problem with people dumping rubbish on it.

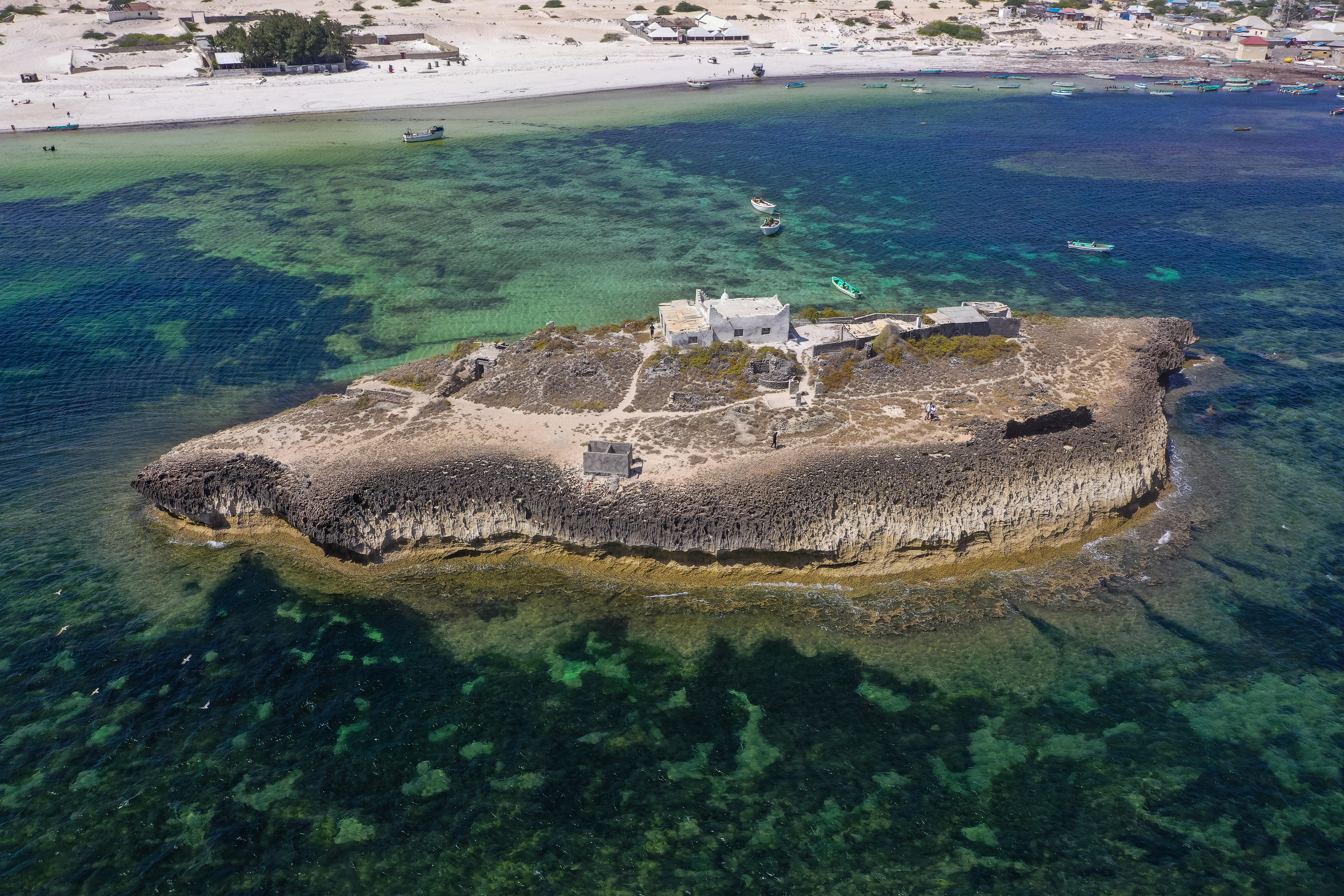

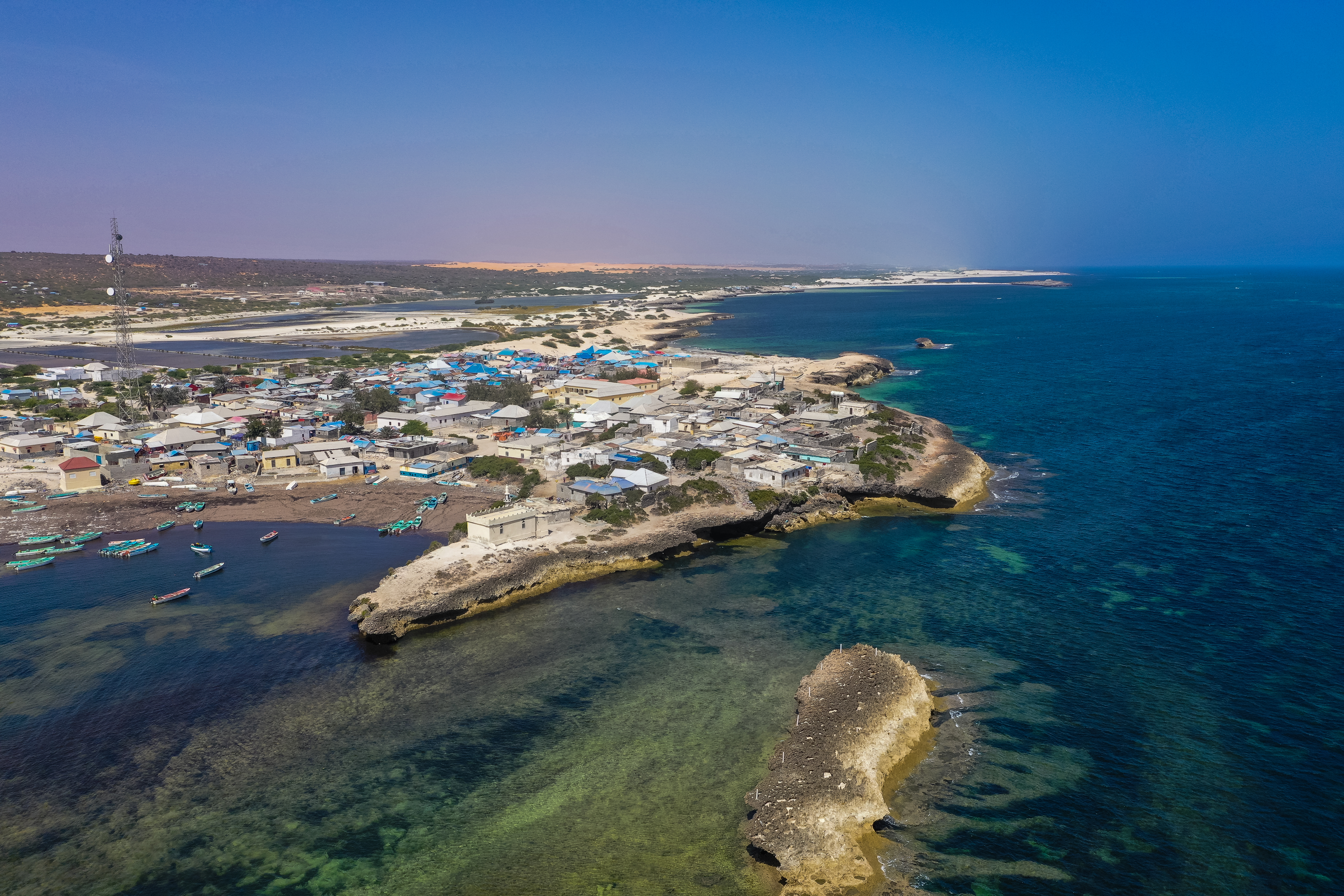
