= Catholic Church in Djibouti =

The Catholic Church in Djibouti is part of the worldwide Catholic Church, under the spiritual leadership of the Pope in Rome.

Catholicism came to Djibouti in 1885, when the first French Capuchin missionaries arrived.

There are around 5,000 Catholics and five Catholic parishes all over the country - just less than 1% of the total population. The country forms a single, exempt diocese - the Diocese of Djibouti.

In 2020, the Vatican noted that there are 5 priests and 24 nuns in the country.

== See also ==
- List of Catholic dioceses in Somalia and Djibouti
- Roman Catholic Diocese of Djibouti
- Religion in Djibouti
- Christianity in Djibouti
- Protestant Church of Djibouti

== Sources and external links ==
- GCatholic
- GCatholic website
