= Georges Perron =

French priest and theologian (1925–2021)

The Most Reverend Georges Perron OFMCap
- Bishop Emeritus of Djibouti
- See: Djibouti
- In office: 1992–2001
- Predecessor: Michel-Joseph-Gérard Gagnon
- Successor: Giorgio Bertin

Orders
- Ordination: June 29, 1951
- Consecration: March 14, 1993 by Jean Cuminal
- Rank: Bishop

Personal details
- Born: 12 January 1925 Chemillé, France
- Died: 6 May 2021 (aged 96) Angers, France
- Denomination: Roman Catholic

Georges Marcel Émile Nicolas Perron OFMCap (12 January 1925 – 6 May 2021) was a French prelate of the Roman Catholic Church. He served as bishop of Djibouti from 1992 until his retirement in 2001.

Georges Perron was born on January 12, 1925, as the second in a family of six children. He entered the Order of Friars Minor Capuchin, did his profession in 1945 and was ordained a priest on June 29, 1951 in the Nantes Cathedral. In 1955, he turned as a missionary to Ethiopia.

Pope John Paul II appointed him bishop of Djibouti in Africa on November 21, 1992. On March 14, 1993, Perron was consecrated a bishop. He was bishop of Djibouti until his retirement age on March 13, 2001. After his retirement, he returned to France. He died in Angers, France on 6 May 2021.

Catholic Church titles
Preceded by Michel-Joseph-Gérard Gagnon	Bishop of Djibouti; November 21, 1992—March 13, 2001	Succeeded by Giorgio Bertin
