= Dhalwo =

- Town
- Location in Somalia.
- Coordinates: 4°34′0″N 47°34′0″E
- Country: Somalia
- Region: Galguduud
- Time zone: UTC+3 (EAT)

Dhalwo is a border town in the central Galguduud region of Somalia.
