= Apostolic Vicariate of the Galla =

Former Catholic Missionary Jurisdiction

The Apostolic Vicariate of the Galla (Latin: Vicariatus Apostolicus Africae inter Populos Galla) was a Roman Catholic Apostolic Vicariate established in 1846, and embracing the territory of the Oromo people (then called the Galla) in the Ethiopian Empire.

== History ==
The vicariate dates from 4 May 1846. The Capuchin Guglielmo Massaia of the Latin Church was the first Vicar Apostolic. He was consecrated Bishop of Cassia on 24 May 1846, and sent on a mission to the Oromo tribes. Only after five years was he able to reach the region of Galla Assandabo, on 20 November 1852. Having evangelized the districts of Goudrou, Lagamara, Limmou, Nonna, and Guera, Massaia entered the Kingdom of Kaffa on 4 October 1859, where conversions were abundant. He provided the converted tribes with priests, so that when persecution obliged him to flee, Christianity did not disappear.

In 1868, Massaia was at Shewa, where he worked until 1879, and enjoyed the confidence of Menelik II of Ethiopia, who made him his confidential counsellor. In the interval the missions of Kaffa and Guera were administered by his coadjutor Bishop Felicissimo Coccino, who died 26 February 1878. In 1879 Negus John of Abyssinia compelled his vassal Menelik to order Bishop Massaia to return to Europe. The bishop had already been banished seven times, and handed over the government of the vicariate to his coadjutor Bishop Taurin Cahagne, from 14 February 1875 titular Bishop of Adramittium.

The mission of Harar was founded by Bishop Taurin, who from 1880 to 1899 worked in this largely Muslim area. He wrote a catechism and works of Christian instruction in the Galla language. The vicariate included the three main districts of Shewa, Kaffa and Harar.

== See also ==
- Roman Catholicism in Ethiopia
- For history from 1914 see Roman Catholic Diocese of Djibouti
