= Islam in Djibouti =

Islam in Djibouti (Pew)
1. Sunnism (77.0%)
2. Non-denominational Muslims (8.00%)
3. Other Muslim (Quranist, Sufism, Ibadism, Cultural etc.) (13.0%)
4. Shi'ism (2.00%)

Islam in Djibouti has a long history, first appearing in the Horn of Africa during the lifetime of Muhammad. Today, 98% of Djibouti's 1.169 million inhabitants are Muslims. According to Pew, 77% follow the denomination of Sunnism (primarily adhering to the Shafi'i legal tradition), whilst 8% are non-denominational Muslim, and the remaining 13% follow other sects such as Quranism, Shia, Ibadism etc.. After independence, the nascent republic constructed a legal system based in part on Islamic law.

== History ==
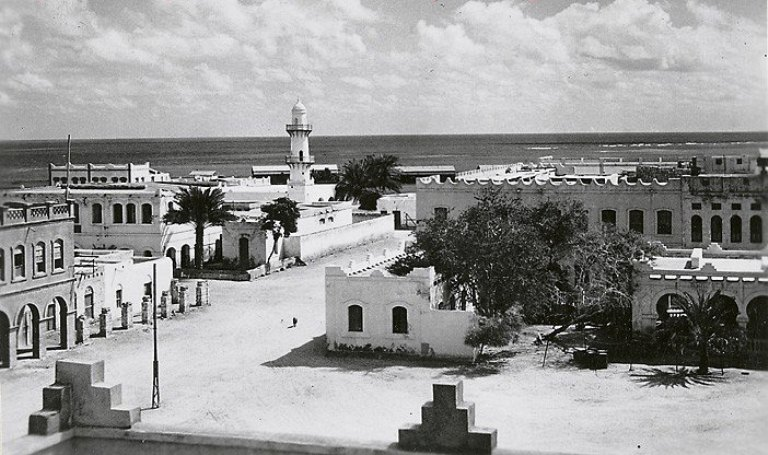
The Al Sada Mosque in Djibouti City in the 1940s

Islam was introduced to the Horn region early on from the Arabian Peninsula, shortly after the hijra. Zeila, in adjacent Somalia's two-mihrab Masjid al-Qiblatayn, dates to the 7th century and is the oldest mosque in the city. In the late 9th century, Al-Yaqubi wrote that Muslims were living along the northern Somali seaboard. He also mentioned that the Adal kingdom had its capital in the city, suggesting that the Adal Sultanate (with Zeila as its headquarters) dates back to at least the 9th or 10th century. According to I.M. Lewis, the polity was governed by local dynasties who also ruled over the similarly-established Sultanate of Mogadishu in the Benadir region to the south. Adal's history from this founding period forth would be characterized by a succession of battles with neighbouring Abyssinia.

== Contemporary Islam ==
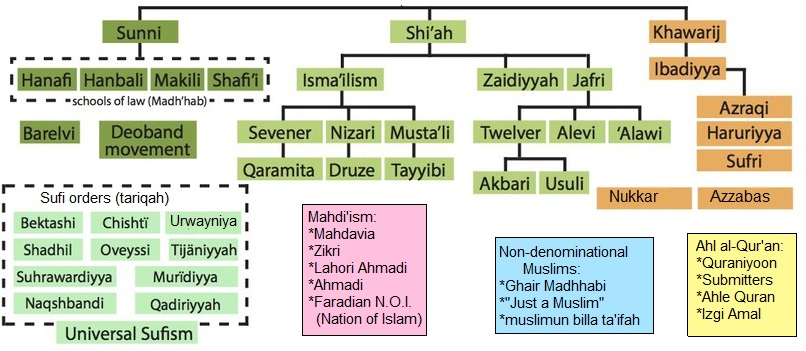
Many diverse forms of Islam are practised in Djibouti.

Djibouti's population is predominantly Sunni Muslim. Islam is observed by 94% of the nation's population, while the remaining 6% of residents are spread between Roman Catholics, Protestants, Ethiopian Orthodox, Greek Orthodox, Jehovah's Witnesses, Hindus, Jews, Bahá’ís, and atheists. The non-Muslim population consists generally of foreign-born citizens and mostly live in Djibouti City.

=== Politics ===
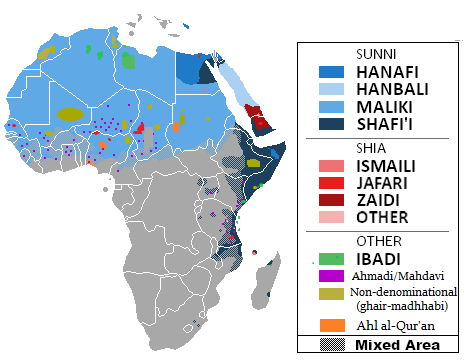
Djibouti mostly colored dark-blue (Shafi'i Sunni)

Article 1 of the Constitution of Djibouti names Islam as the sole state religion, and Article 11 provides for the equality of citizens of all faiths and freedom of religious practice. Although Islam is the state religion, the constitution does not allow for religious based political parties.

Most local Muslims adhere to the Sunni denomination, following the Shafi'i school. The non-denominational Muslims largely belong to Sufi orders of varying schools. According to the International Religious Freedom Report 2014, while Muslim Djiboutians have the legal right to convert to or marry someone from another faith, converts may encounter negative reactions from their family and clan or from society at large, and they often face pressure to revert to Islam.

In 2012, a law was passed that grants the Ministry of Religious Affairs increased oversight of Djibouti’s mosques, including of messages disseminated during Friday prayers. The Ministry of Islamic Affairs reportedly used the new law that regulated mosques to replace imams and temporarily close some mosques. Some imams reported being questioned by security services following sermons with strong political and social justice themes. There were also reports of plainclothes officers monitoring the content of Friday sermons and the activities of people attending mosque services.

In 2014, the government issued a decree executing a law on state control of mosques which converted the status of imams into civil service employees under the Ministry of Islamic Affairs and transferred ownership of mosque properties and other assets to the government. The Secretary General of the Ministry of Religious Affairs stated the decree aims to eliminate political activity from mosques and provide greater government oversight of mosque assets and activities. Government officials also indicated the law was designed to counter perceived foreign influence in mosques.

According to article 23 of the Family Code, a non-Muslim man may marry a Muslim woman only after converting to Islam. Non-Islamic marriages are not legally recognized by the government, which only recognizes marriages performed in accordance with the Ministry of Islamic Affairs or the Ministry of the Interior.

There are approximately 40 private Islamic schools nationwide, which are managed by the Ministry of Islamic Affairs and the Ministry of Education. The public schools remain secular, although the Ministry of Islamic Affairs instituted a program in which religious leaders visit the secular schools for an hour to answer religious questions in non-mandatory events.

== See also ==
- Religion in Djibouti
- Christianity in Djibouti
