= Diocese of Djibouti =

Catholic diocese in Djibouti

Coordinates: 11.6003°N 43.1511°E

Diocese of Djibouti Dioecesis Gibutensis
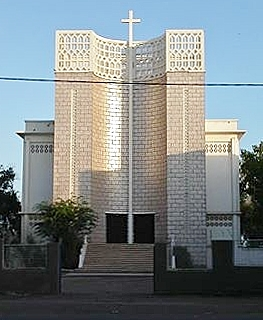
- Our Lady of the Good Shepherd Cathedral

Location
- Country: Djibouti
- Metropolitan: Immediately subject to the Holy See

Statistics
- Area: 23,000 km^{2} (8,900 sq mi)
- Population: Total; Catholics: (as of 2006); 747,000; 5,000 (0.9%)

Information
- Denomination: Roman Catholic
- Rite: Latin Rite
- Cathedral: Our Lady of the Good Shepherd Cathedral, Djibouti

Current leadership
- Pope: Leo XIV
- Bishop: Jamal Khader Daibes
- Bishops emeritus: Giorgio Bertin, OFM

The Roman Catholic Diocese of Djibouti (Latin: Gibuten(sis)) is the Latin sole diocese in the country of Djibouti in the Horn of Africa.

It is exempt, i.e. directly subject to the Holy See through the latter's missionary department, the Roman Congregation for the Evangelization of Peoples.

Its seat, the Our Lady of the Good Shepherd Cathedral (French: Marian Cathédrale de Notre-Dame du Bon-Pasteur) is located in the national capital, Djibouti City.

== Statistics ==
As per 2021, it pastorally served 5,262 Catholics (0.6% of 916,200 total) on 23,200 km^{2} in 5 parishes and a mission with 5 diocesan priests and 26 lay religious (5 brother, 21 sisters).

== History ==
- Established on 28 April 1914, as Apostolic Prefecture of Djibouti, on the colonial territory of French Somaliland, canonically detached from the vast Apostolic Vicariate of Galla (based in Ethiopia, from which also sprang the Apostolic Prefecture of Benadir, for British Somaliland and Italian Somaliland, which became the Roman Catholic Diocese of Mogadiscio covering all modern Somalia)
- Raised on 14 September 1955 to the status of a diocese, with the name Diocese of Djibouti.

== Ordinaries ==
(all of Roman rite and in large part members of Latin missionary orders and congregations)

Apostolic Prefects of Djibouti
Fr. Pascal Lombardo de Luchon, OFMCap (1914 – resigned 1923)

- Fr. Marcellien Lucas de La Guerche, OFMCap (22 October 1937 – resigned 1945)
- Fr. Henri-Bernardin Hoffmann, OFMCap (28 September 1945 – 14 September 1955 see below)

Bishops of Djibouti

- Henri-Bernardin Hoffmann, OFMCap (see above 14 September 1955 – death 21 March 1979)
- Michel-Joseph-Gérard Gagnon, MAfr (28 March 1980 – retired 3 July 1987); later Bishop of Laghouat (Algeria, another former French colony) (4 February 1991 – death 1 June 2004)
- Georges Perron, OFMCap (21 November 1992 – retired 13 March 2001), previously Apostolic Administrator of the Apostolic Vicariate of Harar (Ethiopia) (1982 – resigned 21 November 1992)
- Giorgio Bertin, OFM (13 March 2001 – 13 January 2024), also Apostolic Administrator of Roman Catholic Diocese of Mogadiscio (Somalia) (1990– 13 January 2024)
- Jamal Khader Daibes (13 January 2024 - present), also Apostolic Administrator of Roman Catholic Diocese of Mogadiscio (Somalia) (13 January 2024 - present)

== See also ==
- Roman Catholicism in Djibouti

== Sources and external links ==
- GCatholic.org, with Google satellite photo
- Catholic Hierarchy
