= Diocese of Mogadishu =

Catholic diocese in Somalia

Diocese of Mogadishu Dioecesis Mogadiscensis
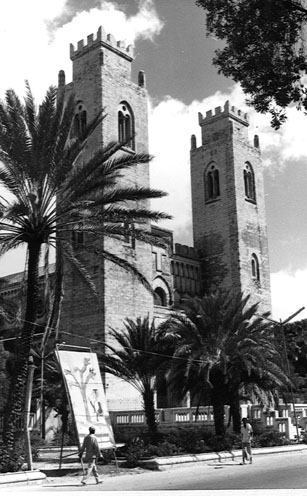

Location
- Country: Somalia
- Metropolitan: Subject to the Holy See

Statistics
- Area: 637,657 km^{2} (246,201 sq mi)
- Population: Total; Catholics: (as of 2014); 10,428,043; 100 (0.0002%)

Information
- Rite: Latin Rite
- Cathedral: Mogadishu Cathedral

Current leadership
- Pope: Leo XIV
- Bishop: Jamal Khader Daibes (apostolic administrator)

Map

The Roman Catholic Diocese of Mogadishu (Latin: Mogadiscen(sis)) is a diocese of the Roman Catholic Church located in the city of Mogadishu, Somalia. The area of the diocese coincides with that of the country. It is the only diocese in Somalia. The see has been vacant since the assassination of the last bishop, Salvatore Colombo, in 1989. The diocese is a member of the Conference of the Latin Bishops of the Arab Regions.

== History ==
In the pre-independence period, British Somaliland was under the care of the Apostolic Vicariate of Arabia, like the Apostolic Vicariate of the Galla (including French Somaliland as well as its Ethiopian main territory) confided to the Order of Friars Cappuccini. Italian Somaliland was from 1904 the "Prefecture Apostolic of Benadir", and entrusted to the ancient Trinitarian Order. In 1927, it was promoted to Apostolic Vicariate.

- 1904: Established as Apostolic Prefecture of Benadir
- 1927: Promoted as Apostolic Vicariate of Mogadishu
- 1975: Promoted as Diocese of Mogadishu

== Bishops ==
=== Prefects Apostolic of Benadir ===
1. Alessandro dei Santi (1905–1924)
2. Gabriele Perlo (Apostolic administrator, 1924 – 22 December 1927)

=== Vicars Apostolic of Mogadishu ===
1. Gabriele Perlo (22 December 1927 – August 1930)
2. Francesco Fulgenzio Lazzati (14 July 1931 – 24 May 1932)
3. Francesco Venanzio Filippini (23 May 1933 – 19 October 1970)
4. Antonio Silvio Zocchetta (19 October 1970 – 1 January 1973)

=== Bishops of Mogadishu ===
1. Salvatore Colombo (20 November 1975 – 9 July 1989)
2. Giorgio Bertin (Apostolic administrator, 29 April 1990 – 13 January 2024)
3. Jamal Khader Daibes (Apostolic administrator, 13 January 2024 – present)

== See also ==
- Catholic Church in Somalia
- Christianity in Somalia
- Mogadishu Cathedral

== Sources ==
- Catholic Hierarchy
- GCatholic.org
