= 2006 timeline of the War in Somalia =

- Decades: 1980s; 1990s; 2000s; 2010s; 2020s
- See also: History of Somalia; List of years in Somalia

The timeline of events in the War in Somalia during 2006 is set out below.

Fatality reports – (A minimum - based on news reports)
Month	Ethiopian soldiers	Somali soldiers	Civilians	Insurgents
December	2300	456	215	1,000

== Incumbents ==
- President: Abdullahi Yusuf Ahmed
- Prime Minister: Ali Mohammed Ghedi

== Timeline ==
=== Battle of Baidoa ===
Battle of Baidoa, December 26, 2006

On December 20, 2006, first major hostilities broke out on many sides around Baidoa. Heavy shooting broke out between Somali government troops and Islamists 25 km (16 mi) southeast of Baidoa where the Islamists claimed to have taken the government's military base in Daynuunay. The conflict thereafter moved north to the Islamist stronghold in Moode Moode (also spelled "Mode Mode"). Heavy weapons, including artillery, rockets and mortars were involved. Initial claims of fighting in this area were at least ten dead ICU militiamen and forty TFG troops wounded. Later claims of ICU casualties by the TFG were 71 Islamic soldiers dead and 221 injured, including two dead foreign fighters. The TFG claimed its own casualties were 3 dead and 7 wounded while the ICU claimed to have killed 7 government troops.

Fighting was reported on many fronts around the capital in Iidale village (55 km south of Baidoa), Buulo Jadid (23 km north of Baidoa, also spelled Bullo Jadid), and Manaas (30 km southwest of Baidoa). One TFG death and numerous injured civilians were reported in Iidale. A later report raised the casualties to three soldiers killed and two injured. Thirteen trucks filled with Ethiopian reinforcements were reported en route to the fighting.

An AFP report mentioned the TFG claimed the attack on Iidale was led by Abu Taha al-Sudan, who is "wanted by Washington for carrying out attacks against its embassies in east Africa in 1998 and against an Israeli-owned hotel in Kenya in 2002."

This report raised the death toll from the artillery duel in Iidale to 12, and added that the government captured 30 "armed vehicles" (presumably technicals). It also contradicted the fall of Daynuunay to the ICU: "'The fighting is so fierce, but government forces are still controlling Daynuunay,' said Issak Adan Mursaley, a resident in Daynuunay."

Meanwhile, an EU peace-brokering commission led by Louis Michel landed at Baidoa and then Mogadishu to meet respectively with the TFG and ICU representatives. Discussions yielded the agreement to meet in Khartoum, Sudan at an unspecified future date.

In Dadaab Kenya, UN Deputy High Commissioner for Refugees, Wendy Chamberlin, said camps there accounted for 34,000 refugees fleeing the fighting and floods in Somalia, but that number is expected to grow to 80,000 if fighting continues. The World Food Programme (WFP) is attempting to provide relief, but floods and mud have hampered ground transportation.

Sheikh Mohamed Ibrahim Bilal, speaking for the ICU, claimed fighting was going its way in Iidale and Buulo Jadid, saying they captured two technicals, killed nine soldiers, and had taken prisoners in the fighting.

On December 21, 2006, Puntland President Adde Muse claimed ICU casualties were heavy in the fighting around Baidoa, sustaining 75 dead and 125 wounded, along with the loss of 30 vehicles burned or captured.

Also reported that same day, fighting in Idale and Daynuunay was said to have started the prior morning and continued through the next day. No stint in the fighting seemed to be coming, as both sides continued to gather reinforcements. Casualty figures were unavailable, but the numbers were expected to be in the hundreds easily. The report went on to refute ICU claim of victory, and stated the government again possession of Iidale and killed foreign fighters.

The government reportedly captured dozens of Islamist students who took up arms, sufficient in quantity to fill three lorries. Islamist militias were said to have taken away the bodies of 70 dead, with another 45 severely wounded being at area hospitals. Conflicting reports from the ICU claim they killed 203 Ethiopian troops and wounded another 200, with the loss of only 20 men and 53 wounded. IRIN confirmed through medical sources at least 50 were killed on both sides and at least 150 to 200 wounded. Civilians were fleeing the area to avoid the heavy fighting.

On December 23, 2006, dozens of dead Ethiopian soldiers were displayed by Islamists to journalists in the recently captured town of Iidale.

The Arab League called for a halt in the fighting, and offered to co-host peace talks between the combatants.

On December 24, 2006, Ethiopian Prime Minister Meles Zenawi appeared on television to declare its defense forces had been forced to enter a war against the Islamists. Ethiopian warplanes reportedly began bombing ICU targets, including Dinsoor and Burhakaba in the Bay region as part of the counter-offensive in the Battle of Baidoa.

Five Ethiopian tanks were said to have been destroyed in the fighting according to Islamists.

On December 24, 2006, in Kismayo, 1,000 men were said to be leaving for the Battle of Baidoa, presumably to fight on behalf of the ICU.

On December 26, 2006, a general retreat from positions held by the ICU was ordered from the front in Baidoa. Burhakaba and Dinsoor were vacated after days of fierce fighting against Ethiopian-backed TFG forces. Ethiopian forces arrived in the towns during the retreat, according to some sources.

Ethiopian Prime Minister Meles Zenawi solidified his position of temporary intervention, saying he would not send Ethiopian military units into the Somali capital, Mogadishu, but encircle the city instead so as to contain the ICU. A government spokesman appeared to offhandedly conflict with this statement however, by saying of the ICU retreat: ‘This is the first stage of victory... When this is all over, we will enter Mogadishu peacefully.’ Ethiopian bombings continued, with three people killed in Leego, east of Burhakaba.

A great deal of speculation, along with claims and refutations, dealt with the number of Ethiopian forces involved in the war. According to an estimate by Rome-based Globe Research, Ethiopian forces around Baidoa were estimated to number about a division of 12,000 soldiers. Baidoa airport hosted a squadron of helicopters, and was being expanded by Ethiopian engineers to accommodate fighter aircraft. New radar was being installed. A second division of light infantry was being positioned against Beledweyne. A third prong was set to advance on Kismayo.

=== Second Front in Mudug and Hiran ===
==== November, 2006 ====
On November 28, 2006, before the outbreak of general hostilities, ICU and Ethiopian troops had exchanged mortar fire in the divided province of Galkayo, Mudug region.

==== December, 2006 ====
On December 22, 2006, Ethiopian troops were said to be amassing in Galkayo for what might turn into a second front of the war near Puntland.

On December 23, 2006, 500 Ethiopian troops and 8 tanks were reported to be heading towards Bandiradley.

On December 24, 2006, Ethiopia admitted its troops are fighting the Islamists. Ethiopian warplanes bombed ICU targets in Jawil and Kala-Bayrka 30 km south of Beledweyne in the Hiran region (300 km or 190 mi north of Mogadishu) and also struck Bandiradley, in Mudug (700 km or 430 mi north of Mogadishu). According to one witness: "We see planes striking us and heavy fighting on the ground intensifying."

Twelve men, identified as Ethiopian prisoners of war, were reported taken in Beledweyne. Eight Ethiopian aircraft were reported to have struck Beledweyne and its residential areas, causing protests in the streets. Ethiopian tanks cut the main Kala-Bayrka road, isolating the town.

Abdulahi Mire Areys, commander of forces for the semi-autonomous government of Puntland in Bandiradley say they were attacked by the ICU, including mortar fire.

ICU commander Mohamud Mohamed Jimale ("Aga-Weyne", "Big Feet") said Ethiopians had attacked Bandiradley and the Sadeh Higlo region of Mudug.

Ethiopian forces, accompanied by the militia of warlord Abdi Qeybdid and the forces of Puntland occupied the ICU barracks of Bandiradley. (Abdi Qeybdid was the last warlord ousted from Mogadishu in July, 2006.) ICU spokesman Sheik Mohamood Jimale Agoweyne, stated Ethiopian aircraft were basing out of Galkayo airport.

On December 25, 2006, ICU officer Sheik Abdiqani Qorane Mohammed claimed Islamist forces killed an unspecified number of Ethiopian troops and downed an Ethiopian helicopter gunship at Bandiradley, while spokesman Sheik Asbdrahman Jiunikow admitted the ICU had retreated from Beledweyne, leaving it to advancing Ethiopian forces after a day of battle. Fighting was also said to be near Jawil in Hiran.

Fighting had advanced in the north, between Bandiradley in Mudug and Galinsor just inside the border of Adado district, Galgadud. Late in the day, Ethiopian troops had advanced from Galinsor and taken Adado, Galgadud, after the ICU abandoned the town following fierce fighting.

In Hiran, Ethiopian forces were reported to have taken both Beledweyne and Buuloburde, with unconfirmed reports that "hundreds of Ethiopian tanks" were moving along the road towards Jowhar. This presents a threat of a major flanking of ICU positions in Tiyoglow and Burhakaba by striking towards the Shabeellaha Dhexe area. The Ethiopian forces were accompanied by Somali warlord Mohamed Omar Habeb 'Mohamed Dhere,' who wished to reestablish his control over Jowhar. The returning ex-Governor of Hiran, Yusuf Dagabed, proclaimed that the town of Beledweyne was liberated and it was again legal to chew khat.

The loss of Adado meant that it became the third to fall to the advancing Ethiopian forces, after Bandiradley and Beledweyne. This has left the ICU vulnerable, with Jowhar their furthermost stronghold (90 kilometres (56 mi) north-east of Mogadishu) after losing vast amounts of territory as quickly as they had gained several months ago. Unconfirmed reports now say that this is due to a change in strategy by the ICU so as to employ guerilla warfare against the more technologically advanced Ethiopian military. The leader of the Council of Islamic Courts executive body appeared to confirm this: "The war is entering a new phase... we will fight Ethiopia for a long, long time and we expect the war to go everyplace." Other Islamic leaders did explicitly threaten guerilla war within Ethiopia, by placing Addis Ababa as a target for suicide bombings. In response to this, the Ethiopian-backed TFG announced an amnesty to any ICU fighter who renounced violence by giving up arms. "The government will not take revenge," a government spokesman was reported to have said.

On December 26, 2006, it became known that ICU forces completely left Mudug, Galgadud, Hiran, Bay and Bakool provinces, clinging to Shabeellaha Dhexe province. Ethiopian forces were predicted to take this in the coming days. This amounted to a ninety per cent loss of territory of what the ICU once had before the Ethiopian intervention. The Islamic courts claimed that they would adopt the Taliban-style guerilla warfare that has been used in Afghanistan.

=== Military Actions in Ethiopia ===
On December 23, 2006, the Ogaden National Liberation Front (ONLF) claimed to have attacked an Ethiopian column near Baraajisale heading to Somalia, destroying 4 of 20 vehicles, inflicting casualties and driving the convoy back.

On January 15, 2007, ONLF rebels attacked Ethiopian soldiers in Qabri-Dahar, Garbo, and Fiiq. Five Ethiopian soldiers and one ONLF rebel have been reported killed.

=== Attacks on Mogadishu and Bali-Dogle Airports ===
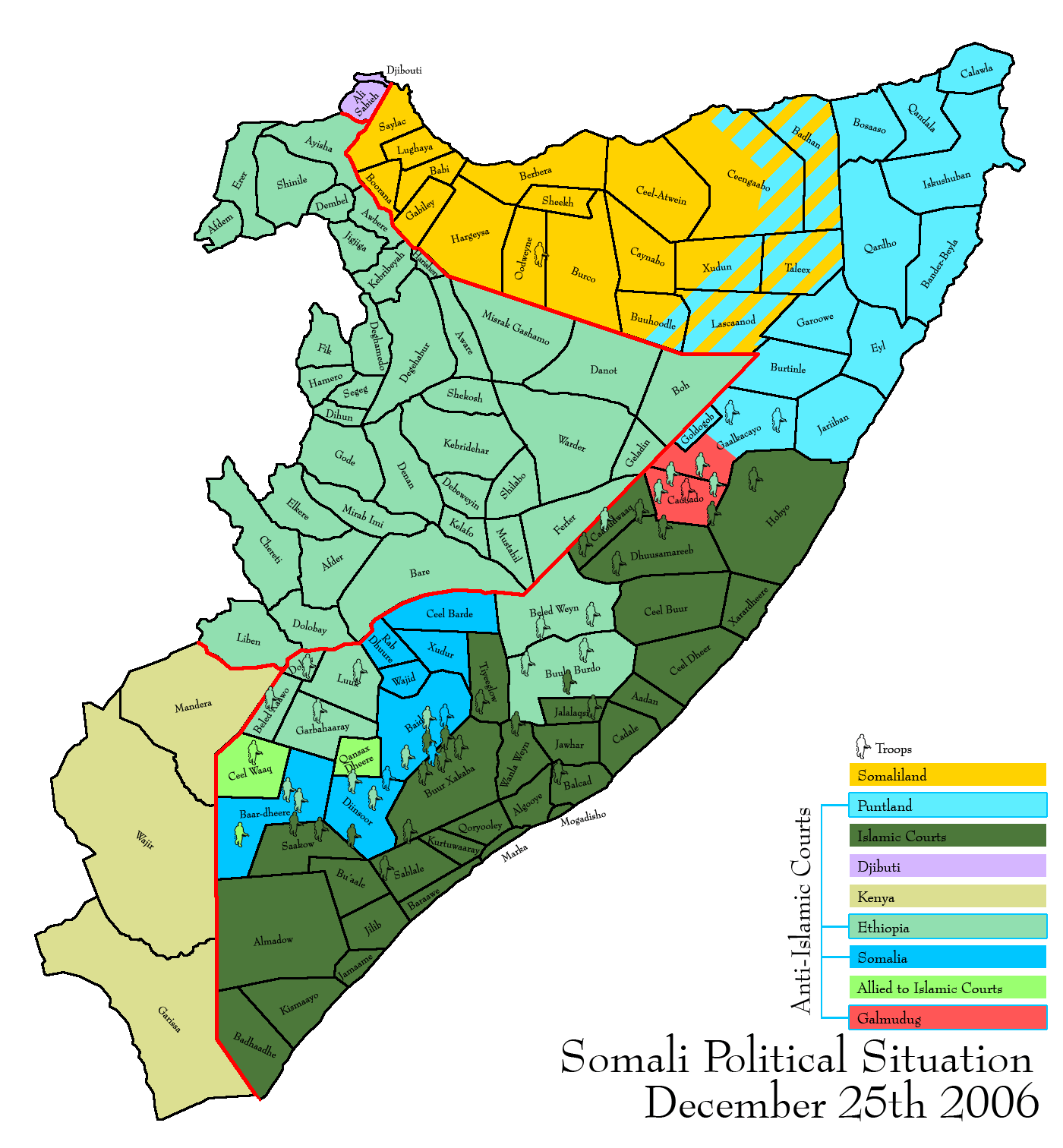

On December 25, 2006, Ethiopian jets bombed Mogadishu's main airport held by the ICU since June 2006. Witnesses reported MiG fighter jets fired missiles into the airport twice. One person was killed and a number injured. Further north, Beledweyne was also bombed, according to witnesses. The fighting between the Ethiopian-backed TFG and the ICU became stretched to over 400 km (250 mi) of land.

Bali-Dogle airport in southern Somalia was also reported struck. This airport lies 115 km northwest of Mogadishu in the district of Wanlaweyne about halfway between the capital and the front lines at Burhakaba.

The TFG declared the borders of Somalia were closed. The Ethiopian attacks on the airports were due to claims the airports had recently been used for "unauthorized flights". This presumably relates to prior flights allegedly carrying Islamist volunteers wishing to fight for the ICU.

=== Retreat of the ICU ===
==== December 26, 2006 ====
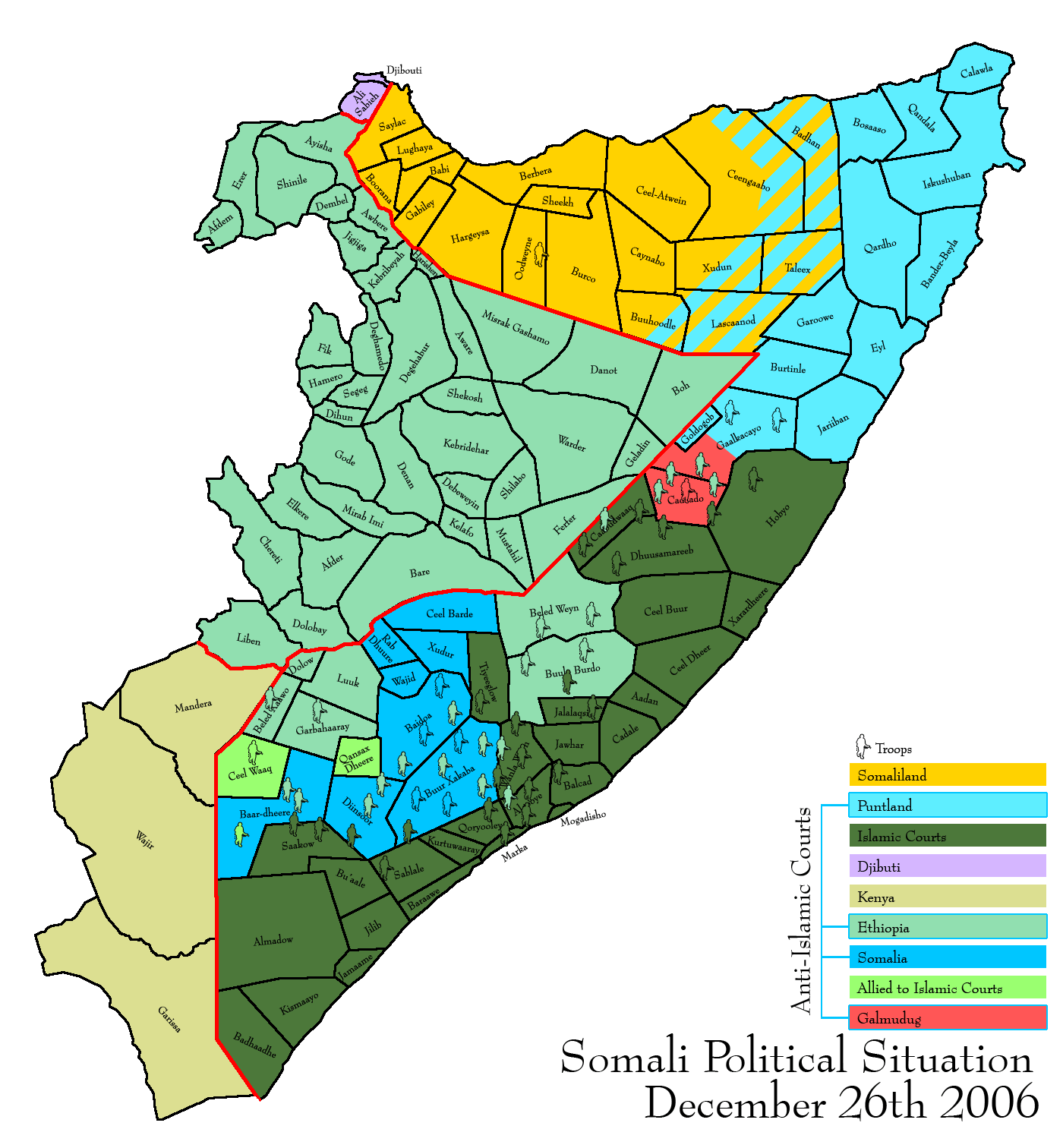

On December 26, 2006 the Council of Islamic Courts fighters retreated from the main frontline after a week of artillery and mortar duels and attacks by Somali transitional government and Ethiopian soldiers, witnesses say. Ethiopian forces took control of Burhakaba early on Tuesday without any fighting, Jama Nur, Al Jazeera's correspondent in Mogadishu, reported. Transitional government and Ethiopian forces have moved 40 km towards the capital since taking control of Baladweyne town on Monday, he said.

Islamist spokesman Abdi Kafi said in response to the impending Ethiopian attack on the capital that "It will be their destruction and doomsday" and that "It is a matter of time before we start striking at them from all directions".

"A joint Somali government and Ethiopian force has broken the back of the international terrorist forces... These forces are in full retreat," Meles Zenawi told reporters in Addis Ababa, adding that up to 1,000 Islamist fighters had been killed. "A few are Somali but the majority are foreigners," he said of the dead.

Meles said that the Ethiopian army was halfway on its mission in Somalia. Ethiopian Ambassador to Somalia, Abdulkarin Farah took time to list some of the 17 cities Ethiopian and Somali government forces had overrun:

Around Baidoa:	On the approach to Dhusamareeb:	In Hiran:
Dinsoor; Bur Hakaba; Idale; Moode Moode	Bandiradley; Galinsor; Adado	Kalabayr; Beer Gadiid; Ceel Gaal; Beledweyn; Garasyani; Halgan; Buuloburde

Lastly, he said that the Ethiopian and TFG forces were advancing on the airport at Bali-Dogle.

Ethiopian troops were accused by Islamic leader Sheik Sharif Sheik Ahmed of massacring 50 civilians in the central town of Cadado

Ethiopian forces advancing south towards Jowhar were reported facing off ICU troops in Fidow in Hiran and Bur Weyn (the latter is halfway between Buulo Burde and Jalalaqsi). Later Jalalaqsi was reported taken. There, Mohamed Dhere urged for peace as he advanced towards Jowhar. Dhusamareeb was also described as abandoned by the ICU.

==== December 27, 2006 ====
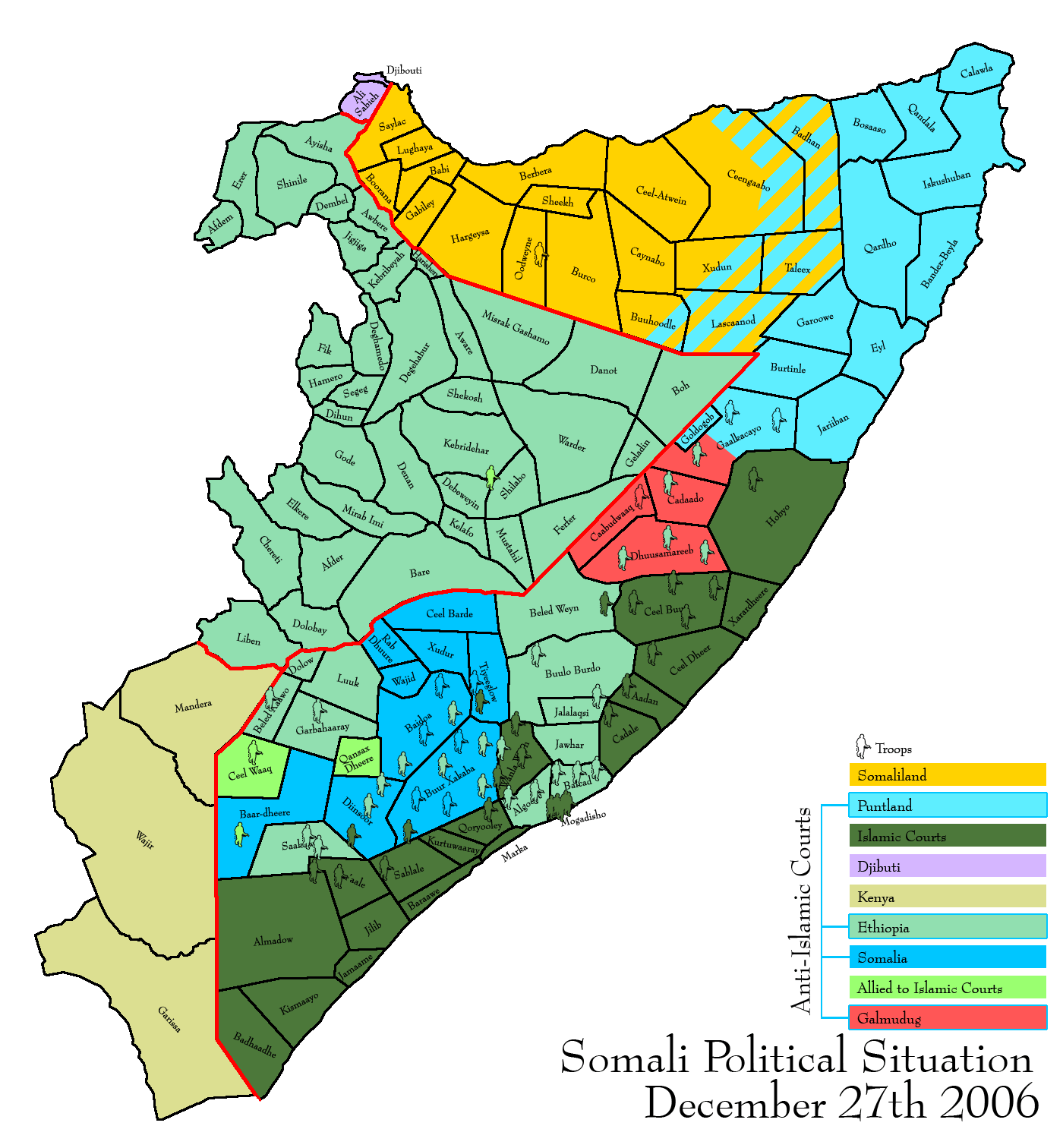

On December 27, 2006, The New York Times reported analysts in Nairobi, Kenya claimed US surveillance aircraft were funnelling information to Ethiopian forces. Maj. Kelley Thibodeau said she was "not at liberty to discuss" the matter. There was also a claim Eritrean forces were arming the ICU with anti-aircraft missiles to defend Mogadishu.

ICU forces, on the run since suffering defeats against advancing Ethiopian and TFG forces, rallied at Jimbale, 140 kilometres (87 mi) north of Mogadishu. This began a brief battle for the strategic ICU stronghold of Jowhar. (See Battle of Jowhar)

After losing this town, the ICU also abandoned Balad, just north of Mogadishu.

On the advance from Burhakaba, government forces were met with stiff resistance in Leego, on the approaches to Lower Shabelle.

=== Fall of Mogadishu ===
By the time the capital fell to the TFG and Ethiopian forces, military vehicles contributed by Ethiopia to the conflict included approximately 200 Ethiopian tanks and nearly 500 military vehicles in total, attack helicopters and MiG fighter jets. This represented a significant commitment of its total armored forces given the country has an estimated 170 T-55, 50 T-62, and 50 T-72 tanks in its army. It was unclear how many of Ethiopia's estimated 25 MiG-21, 12 MiG-23 or 12 Sukhoi-27 aircraft were committed to the conflict.

==== December 27, 2006 ====
Somalia's envoy to Ethiopia has confirmed that Ethiopian-backed Somali government troops will lay siege to Mogadishu until it surrenders. "We are not going to fight for Mogadishu to avoid civilian casualties... Our troops will surround Mogadishu until they surrender," he told reporters in Addis Ababa.

ICU troops abandoned their barracks in the town of Balcad, the last town before the outskirts of Mogadishu. Ethiopian and Somali government forces, accompanied by patrolling Ethiopian jets, approached within 30 km of the city.

The hope was to take the city with minimal violence. TFG spokesman Abdirahman Dinari said, "Islamic courts militias are already on the run and we hope that Mogadishu will fall to our hands without firing a shot."

Clan leaders in Mogadishu considered whether to back the government troops advancing on the capital. This would preempt a possible lengthy and bloody fight for the capital and deal a devastating blow to the Islamic Courts. Islamic fighters were seen changing out of their uniforms and into civilian clothing while women were spotted on the streets selling the narcotic khat which was banned by the Islamists.

Areas in the north of Mogadishu were reported to be taken over by clan militias who rapidly switched allegiances and reversed the policies of the ICU, allowing khat to be sold openly, and for cinemas to reopen. Some ICU fighters are said to have fled towards the port city of Kismayo, their last remaining stronghold, 480 km (300 mi) to the south. Remaining ICU troops were reported shaving their beards or in hiding and there was speculation in the capital that Kismayo would fall soon.

Islamists turned over their weapons to local clan leaders and militias in the capital. Islamists in the Karan neighborhood of Mogadishu handed over their weapons to Abukar Bolow, a subordinate of a former Mogadishu warlord who welcomed TFG forces, while in the neighborhoods of Boondheere and Siinay, ICU fighters handed over their weapons to local clan militias, who placed posters of Abdullahi Yusuf and Ali Ghedi on their battlewagons. Furthermore, the Hawiye, Somalia's largest clan, began discussing a peaceful resolution with the interim government. According to several eyewitnesses on the scene, the stability created by the Islamic militias has also begun to collapse with people returning to their homes and bandits once again roaming the streets.

The top leaders of the ICU, including Sheikh Hassan Dahir Aweys, Sheikh Sharif Sheikh Ahmed and Sheikh Abdirahman Janaqow, resigned in anticipation of the siege in order to prevent more bloodshed. Their official press release called upon ICU fighters to secure the areas in which they were stationed and expressed their regret that foreign powers had invaded the country and that Somalia would return to chaos, losing the "significant acts" that they claim to have brought to Somalis. They issued the following decisions:

# It is the national duty to protect the sovereignty and the integrity of Somalia and its people.

1. The ICU allows that Somalis should have the option to determine their future and would be ready for taking over the responsibility.
2. The Islamic Courts Union agreed not to allow anyone to create violence in Mogadishu and anybody that is found guilty would be brought before the law and would be taken for the suitable punishment according to the Islamic Sharia.
3. The ICU fighters are responsible for establishing the security and stability in the Somalia capital Mogadishu.
4. Lastly, the ICU is calling on all the Islamic fighters in wherever they are in Somalia to secure the stability and get ready in the police stations and other security stations.

==== December 28, 2006 ====
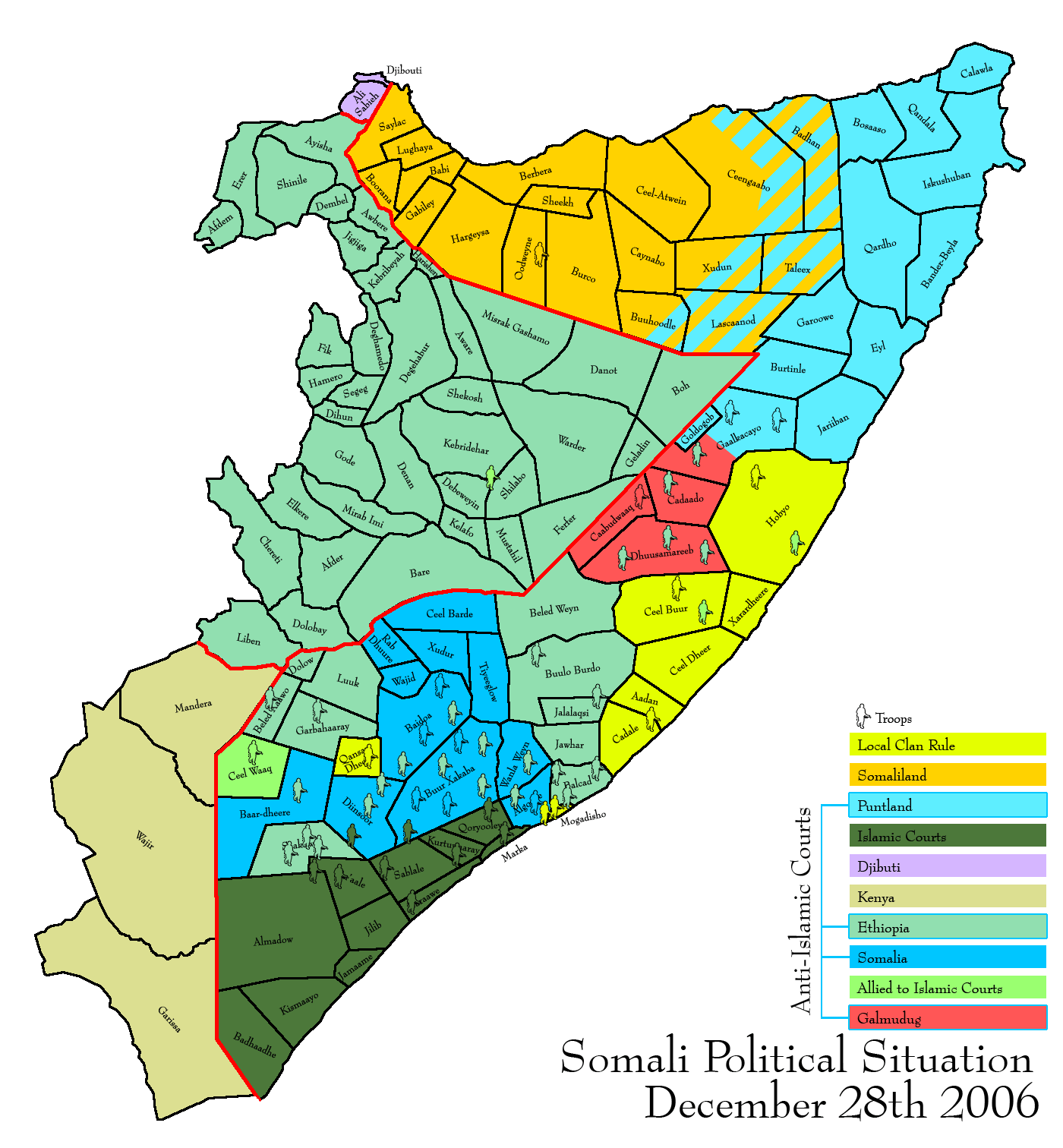

TFG spokesman Abdirahman Dinari cautiously expressed, "We are taking control of the city and I will confirm when we have established complete control... Our forces already effectively control Mogadishu because we have taken over the two control points on the main roads outside the city... Within two to three hours we will capture the whole city." He also added the government was in control of 95% of the country, but a state of emergency would be imposed to bring law and order back to the country. An ebullient Member of Parliament, Mohamed Jama Fuurah called Reuters from the port of Mogadishu saying, "The government has taken over Mogadishu. We are now in charge." Pro-government militias were said to control of key locations, including the former presidential palace. Ali Ghedi, the Prime Minister of the transitional government, stated that Somali government troops had entered Mogadishu without resistance, as well as the town of Afgoye on its outskirts. Mohamed Jama Furuh, a member of parliament and former warlord, took control of Mogadishu's seaport on the government's behalf, an area he had controlled before the rise of the ICU as a warlord. The President, Abdullahi Yusuf, asserted that TFG troops were not a threat to the city-dwellers, though there were some reports of gunfire in the city.

Meles Zenawi declared Ethiopia's mission in Somalia 75% completed with the occupation of Mogadishu by the government, with the only uncompleted task being the capturing of foreign fighters and defeat of remaining "extremists". As the army martialled at Afgoye, outside of Mogadishu, over 500 vehicles could be seen assembled, including over 200 Ethiopian tanks. Only 35 of the vehicles belonged to the TFG.

==== December 29, 2006 ====
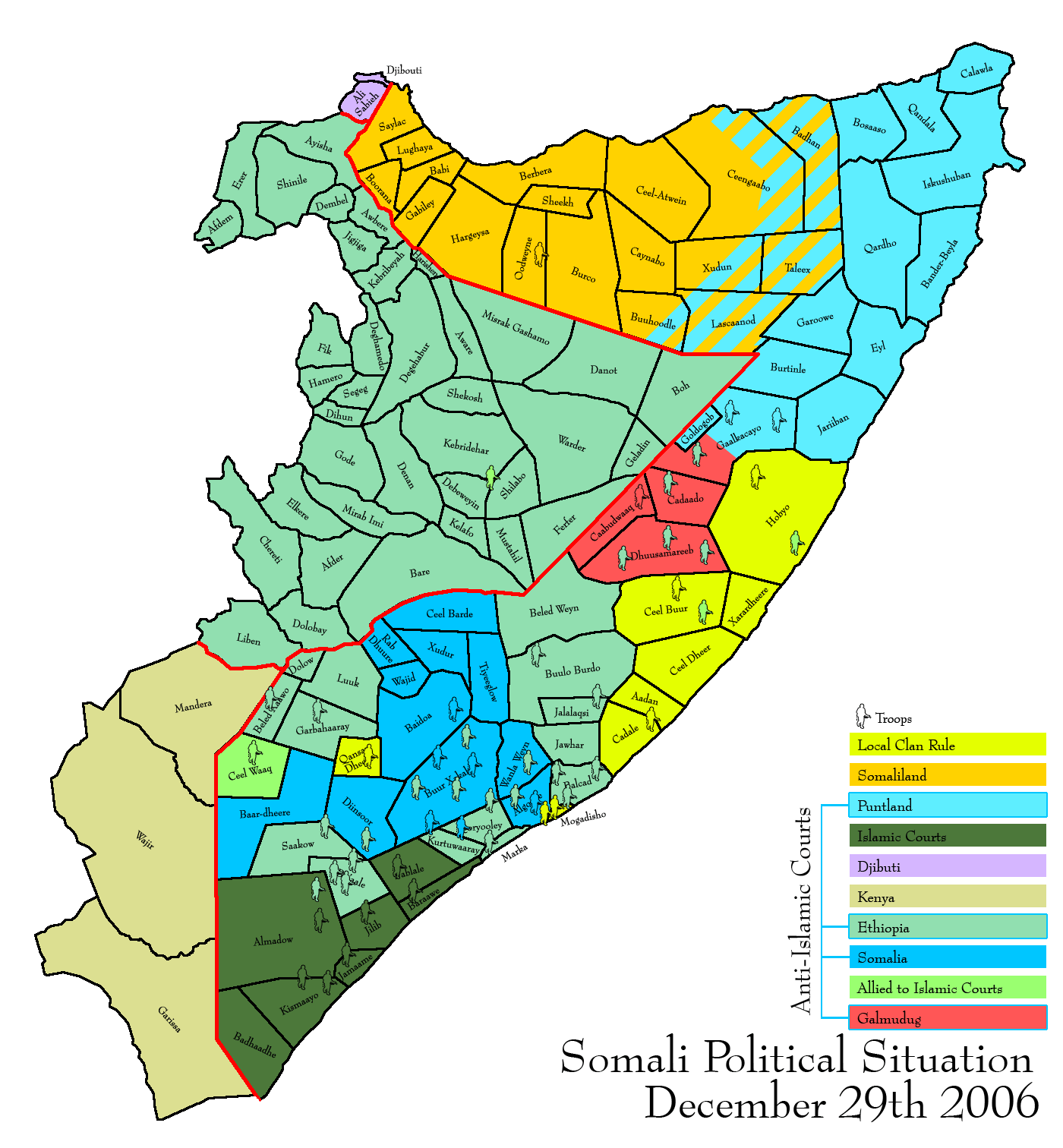

Mohamed Qanyare, another Mogadishu warlord, returned to the city and made a plea for the federal government to not disarm the militias. Qanyare was former TFG Security Minister before losing his position as a result of the Second Battle of Mogadishu. Gedi's decree for disarmament also applied to non-government troops in the autonomous state of Puntland, where it was seen as questionably enforceable.

==== December 30, 2006 ====
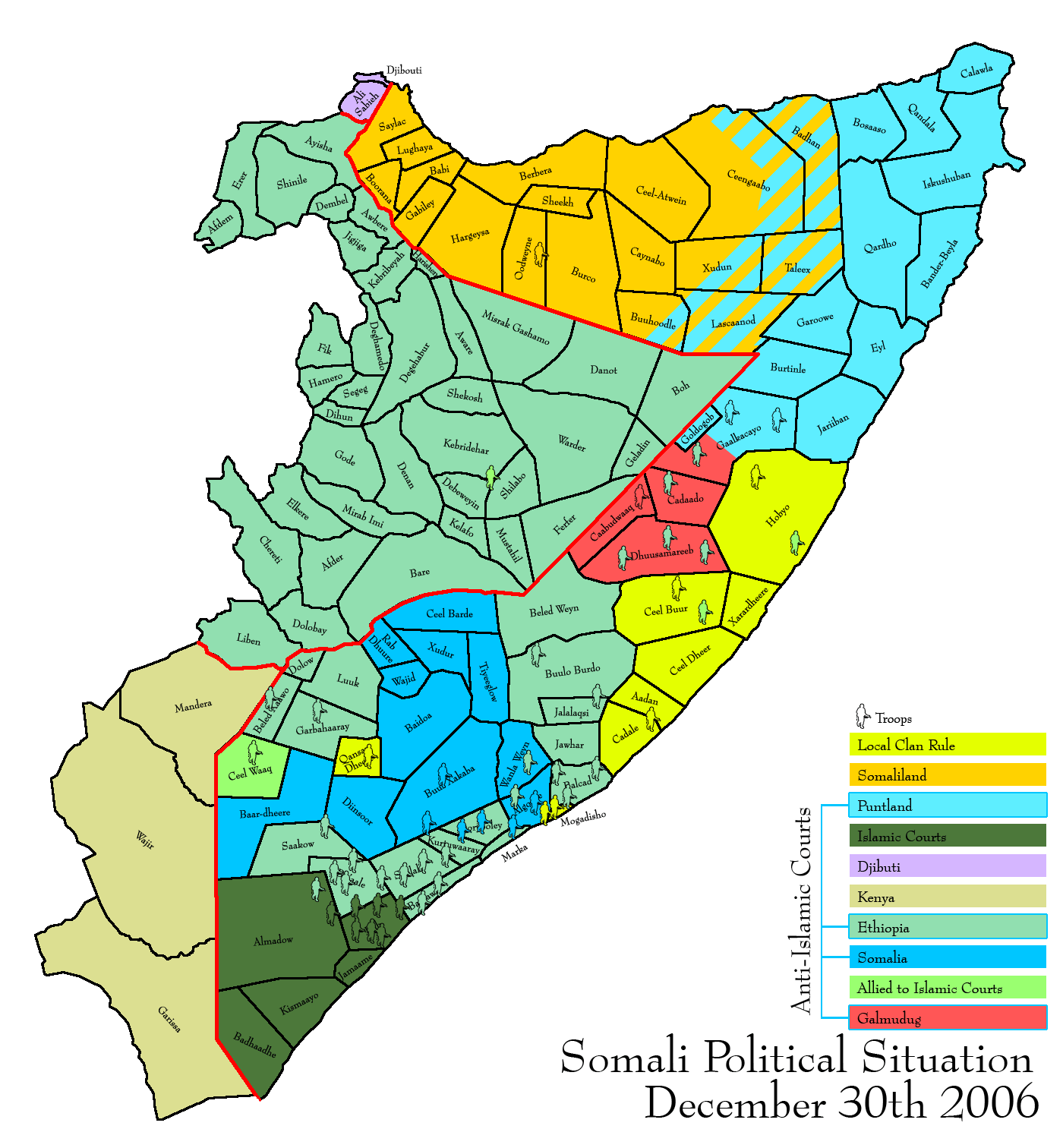

Anti-Ethiopian sentiment is on the rise with hundreds protesting against their presence in the capital. Another development is the appearance of masked men which has never happened before and may signal the beginnings of an Iraq-style insurgency.

==== December 31, 2006 ====
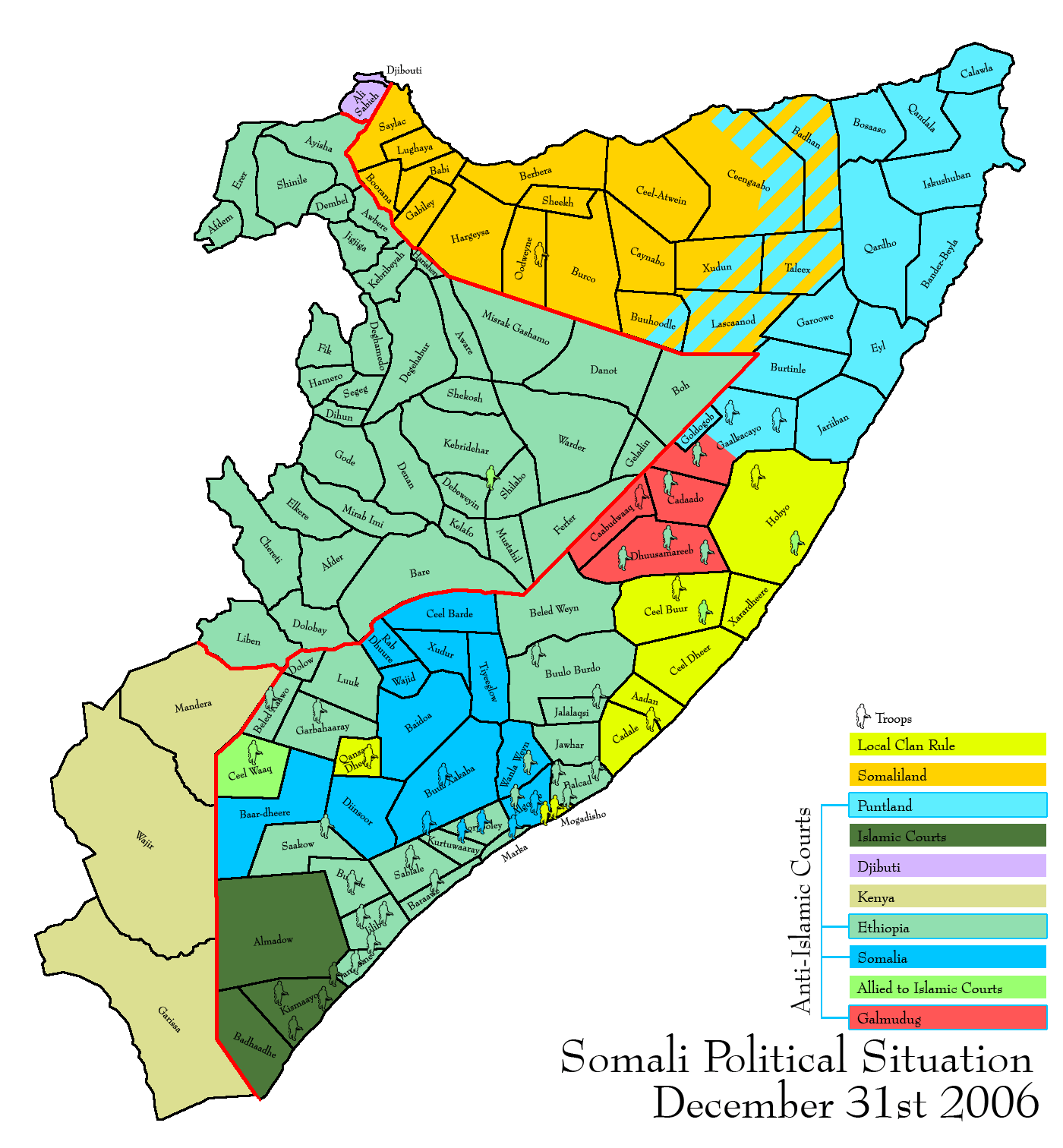

In Mogadishu, a missile aimed at Ethiopian troops slammed into a residential area reportedly killing one woman and injuring a man and their daughter. Also, an explosion occurred around 9pm local time at the Hotel Ramadan in Yaaqshiid district, former headquarters of the ICU. Two people were injured. It was speculated that the target might have been Ethiopian troops who had taken over control of the hotel.

Assistant Trade Minister for the TFG, Abdifitah Ibrahim Rashid, accused men loyal to Defense Minister Col. Barre Hiiraale of killing ten civilians and kidnapping ten others near Dinsor, Bay region. The incident came after a man was caught driving a pickup truck loaded with ammunition and explosives. The truck had belonged to the Juba Valley Alliance before it was seized in fighting at Bu'aale by the ICU earlier in the year.

In an effort to head off additional bloodshed, Yusuf Ahmed Hagar "Dabageed," returning governor of Hiran, called for an end of three days of reprisals conducted by men loyal to him and the TFG. He urged an end to the hunting for former members of the Islamist militias offered assurances that those who were now mingled with the rest of the population would not be hurt or killed.

=== Control of the Juba Valley ===

==== December 27, 2006 ====
The ICU abandoned its positions in the Jubba River valley at Salagle and Sakow, north of Bu'aale. The ICU had been in possession of Salagle for two weeks, taking the town on December 13, 2006. Sakow had fallen to the ICU in October after they defeated the Juba Valley Alliance.

ICU forces in Kismayo were reported retreating towards Mogadishu, and TFG forces were advancing towards Bu'aale from Dinsoor, while the rest of the Jubbada Hoose and Jubbada Dhexe areas were calm.

==== December 28, 2006 ====
Islamist forces continued to withdraw to the south toward Kismayo, and Ahmed Ali Harare, ICU military commander of Southern Somalia, avowed the ICU would not leave Kismayo without a fight. Though the ICU leadership had formally resigned, they did not surrender to government forces. Hassan Dahir Aweys, accompanied by 45 technicals equipped with anti-aircraft guns, arrived in the strategic town of Jilib, 105 km (65 mi) north of Kismayo. A confidential UN situational report stated that Islamists were going door-to-door to recruit fighters as young as 12 in Kismayo, citing families who claim relatives had been taken to Jilib to fight. Only the most hardcore fighters, numbering about 3,000, are still opposing the government according to some former ICU militiamen.

==== December 29, 2006 ====
TFG forces under Defense Minister (and former head of the Juba Valley Alliance) Barre Adan Shire Hiiraale entered Bu'aale, approximately 150 km north of Kismayo. Ethiopian jets continued to patrol over Jilib, and a column of 15 tanks was reported heading towards Bu'aale and Jilib. The Islamic militia reportedly mined the road to Jilib.

As Islamist leader Sheikh Aweys vowed to fight on, and called for others to create an insurgency against the government, a heavily armed column of government and Ethiopian troops advanced from Mogadishu through Lower Shabelle towards Kismayo. They reached Bulo Marer (Kurtun Warrey district) and were heading to Baravo.

==== December 31, 2006 ====
Elders of various clans in Kismayo, afraid of the potential devastation to their city, asked Islamic fighters to leave. The Islamists reportedly refused the request. As a result, gunbattles have been reported between Islamists and local clan militias.

=== Battle of Jilib ===

On Saturday, December 30, 2006, joint Ethiopian/TFG troops had reached the town of Jilib, the last major town on the road to Kismayo. Sheik Sharif Sheik Ahmed urged the ICU soldiers to fight on.

On Sunday December 31, 2006, fighting began in the thick mango forests near Helashid, 18 km (11 mi) to the northwest of Jilib. Ethiopian MiG fighters, tanks, artillery and mortars struck Islamic positions in the assault. Residents reported the road to Jilib was littered with remote-controlled landmines by the ICU and three bridges leading to the town have been destroyed.

TFG and Ethiopian forces also attacked Bulobaley, raining down fire from mortars and rockets. In Jilib, Islamists used bulldozers to prepare trenches and defensive positions. They had about 3,000 fighters and 60 technicals mounted with anti aircraft and anti tank guns. Up to 4,700 people fled the area ahead of the fighting.

At approximately 5:00pm, a heavy gun battle erupted on the outskirts of Jilib town between Islamic fighters and the Ethiopian-backed interim government troops. Tanks and armored vehicles were reported committed by Ethiopian forces. The sound of heavy artillery fires could be heard in Jamame town near Jilib, local residents said.

During the night, artillery strikes continued, eventually forcing the ICU frontlines to falter. A mutiny within the ICU caused their forces to disintegrate, and abandon both Jilib and Kismayo. They were reported to be fleeing towards the Kenyan border.

== See also ==
- 2007 timeline of the War in Somalia
- 2008 timeline of the War in Somalia
- 2009 timeline of the War in Somalia
- Somalia War (2006–2009)
- Somali Civil War (2009–present)
