= 2007 timeline of the War in Somalia =

- Decades: 1980s; 1990s; 2000s; 2010s; 2020s
- See also: History of Somalia; List of years in Somalia

The timeline of events in the War in Somalia during 2007 is set out below.

Fatality reports–(A minimum - based on news reports)
Month	Ethiopian soldiers	Somali soldiers*	Other soldiers**	Insurgents	Civilians
January	4	3	None	25	70
February	None	2	None	4	30
March–April	37	13	1	429	1,212
May	None	1	5	None	1
June	2	7	2	13	19
July	11	23	None	None	60
August	5	32	None	11	69
September	None	80	None	106	55
October	18	27	None	11	79
November	16	9	None	1	123
December	None	21	None	1	55
TOTAL	93 (500)	218	8	601	1,823 (8,636)
Sources: SomaliNet *The number includes policemen, militiamen and intelligence personnel **Other soldiers killed: 2 (Kenya) Kenyan, 6 (Uganda) Ugandan

== Incumbents ==
- President: Abdullahi Yusuf Ahmed
- Prime Minister:
  - until 30 October: Ali Mohammed Ghedi
  - 30 October-24 November: Salim Aliyow Ibrow
  - starting 24 November: Nur Hassan Hussein

== Timeline ==
=== January 1, 2007 ===
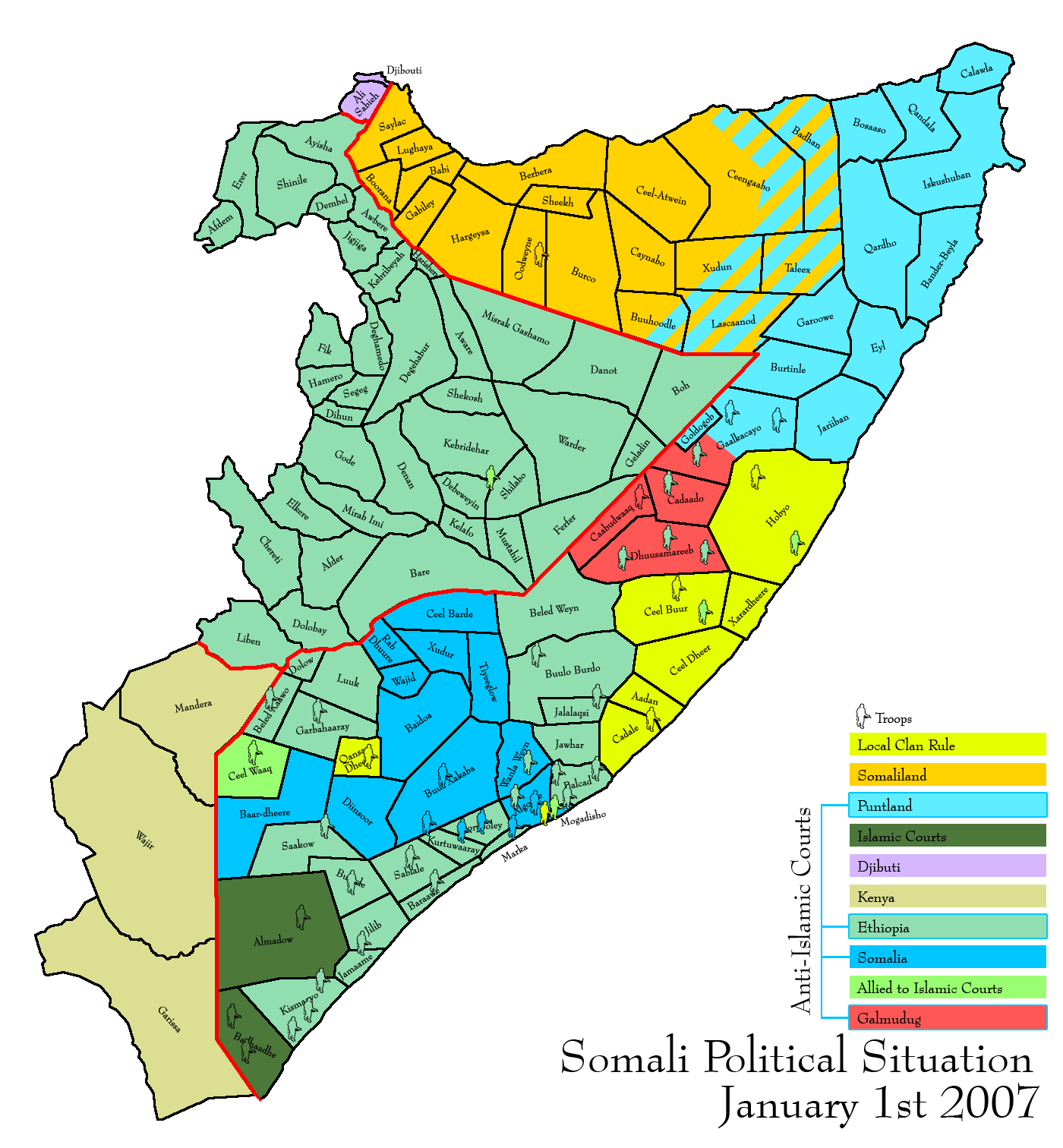

On January 1, Islamists abandoned their last stronghold in Kismayo. After their departure, looters took to the streets, but order was restored shortly. The Islamists are reportedly retreating toward the Kenyan border. Kenya has boosted security at the border to prevent them from entering their territory.

African and Arab League countries have called on Ethiopia to withdraw its troops from Somalia, but these troops practically constitute the military might of the Interim Government whose head, Ali Mohamed Gedi, insists the Ethiopian troops stay in Somalia until he no longer needs them.

In a move to curb resistance against the come-back of the Interim government, after the take-over of Mogadishu on Friday, Ali Mohammed Gedi swiftly announced the introduction of martial law, but such a measure, taken on the background of what is seen as foreign occupation, is already sparking the organization of guerrilla warfare in the capital.

On December 31, 2006, Sharif Sheikh Ahmed, chairman of the Islamic Courts Union (ICU), along with other senior ICU officials in the port city of Kismayu about 500 km (310 mi) south of Mogadishu, urged Islamist supporters across the country to initiate an insurgency to wage guerrilla war against the Ethiopian troops backing the Somali transitional government. Ahmed issued the statement after the Muslim Eid prayers on Saturday: "I call on the Islamic Courts fighters, supporters and every true Muslim to start an insurgency against the Ethiopian troops in Somalia. We are telling the Ethiopians in Somalia that they will never succeed in their mission. By Allah, they will fail... We will not allow the Ethiopian troops to stay peacefully in Somalia."

=== January 2, 2007 ===
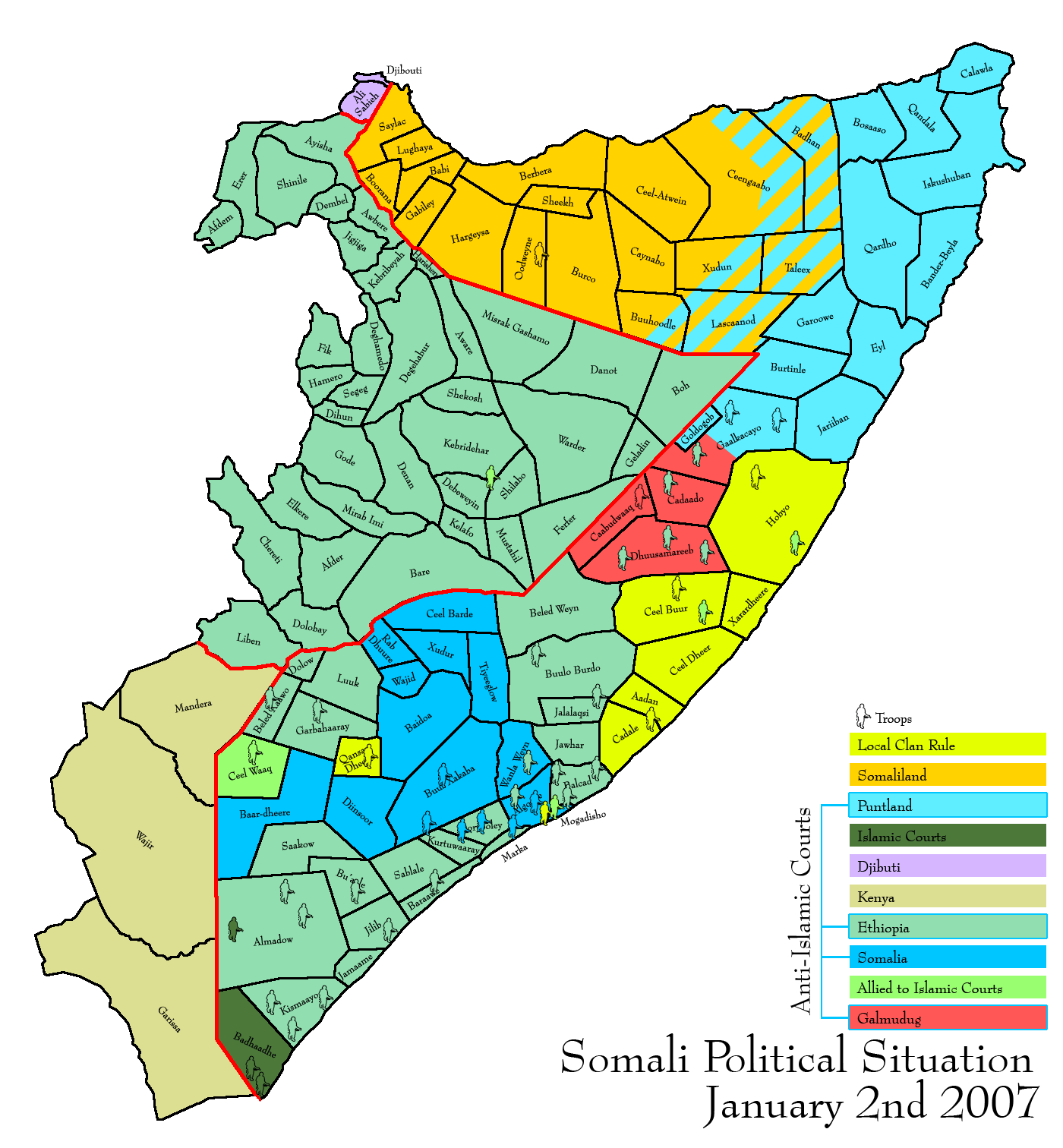

- 2 Ethiopian, 1 insurgent, 2 civilians killed

Two Ethiopian soldiers were killed and three injured by one gunman in the town of Jilib. The suspected Islamist gunman was killed along with two Somalis later in the day. Kenya sealed its Somali border with helicopters, soldiers, and police in order to prevent Islamists from entering. During the course of the day Ethiopian helicopters accidentally bombed a Kenyan border post at Har Har, but did not cause any casualties. The Somali President Abdullahi Yusuf also met with Mwai Kibaki in Mombasa, Kenya.

Prime minister Meles Zenawi said Ethiopia is not able to stay in Somalia because of the high economic burden that would come with a prolonged troop investment. A call for peacekeepers has been made but many countries are reluctant to intervene without a clear mission and are wary of what happened in prior peacekeeping missions.

On January 2, 2007, US Marines operating out of Lamu, Kenya, were said to be assisting Kenyan forces patrolling the border with Somalia with the interception of Islamists.

=== January 3, 2007 ===
Ethiopian aircraft and attack helicopters struck the town of Doble (Dhoobley), Afmadow province, not far from the Kenyan border. The strikes were presumably to hit ICU elements attempting to cross the border. Fighting tailed off after midnight.

A return to normality in the capital was furthered by the re-opening of the Mogadishu airport.

=== January 4, 2007 ===
Unconfirmed reports said six Kenyan herders were killed by Ethiopian aircraft that crossed over the border of Somalia. Cordoning off the border, 20 Kenyan tanks were dispatched to patrol the frontier stretching between Liboi, in Garissa district to Kiunga, Lamu district. Reports said ICU troops were split across Afmadow and Badade districts, and possibly concentrated at the former al-Ittihad al-Islamiya (AIAI) stronghold of Ras Kamboni. TFG and Ethiopian forces reported taking district capital Afmadow (January 2), and Dhobley along the Kenyan border (January 3), and were presently en route to Badade, the district capital just north of Ras Kamboni. In Nairobi, up to ten of the twenty Somali Members of Parliament in Kenya who were alleged to have ties to the Islamic Courts were taken into custody. One report said five were taken into custody. Another report said ten.

Unknown gunmen thought to be Somali Islamists fired shots at a Kenyan security helicopter patrolling near the border with Somalia. The helicopter was flying over the southeastern Kenyan border town of Hulugho. The report did not say if the aircraft was damaged but said gunmen fired small arms from the region of Ras Kamboni, the base for the fleeing Islamists.

In Mogadishu, TFG militias set up checkpoints in the city. At one checkpoint, a group of militia apparently attempted to extort money from the driver of an oil tanker truck. In the ensuing argument, a rocket was fired at the vehicle, injuring at least 2 or 3 people. The vehicle had been carrying dozens of passengers who disembarked before the rocket attack.

=== January 5, 2007 ===
On January 5, 2007, Sheikh Farah Moallim Mohamud became the highest-ranking member of the Islamic Courts Union (ICU) to be captured by the Ethiopian-Somali forces. He was apprehended near Beledweyne then later released because of the general amnesty offered to Islamists who surrendered to the government.

On January 5, 2007, TFG Defense Minister Col. Barre Aden Shire Hiiraale announced: "Today we will launch a massive assault on the Islamic courts militias. We will use infantry troops and fighter jets... They have dug huge trenches around Ras Kamboni but have only two options: to drown in the sea or to fight and die." Fighting continued January 6 in the jungles south of Kismayo near the Kenyan border, where it was reported the Islamists were holding out armed with over 100 technicals.

=== Battle of Ras Kamboni ===

- 16 insurgents, 44 civilians killed

The battle at Ras Kamboni was fought over January 5–12, 2007. During the operations, a US airstrike hit Badmadow Island in an attempt to kill Al Qaeda operatives embedded within ICU forces, and a series of Ethiopian airstrikes occurred to the north in Afmadow district.

=== January 6, 2007 ===
On January 6, a crowd of more than 100 rioters gathered near Tarabunka square in Mogadishu. They protested the presence of Ethiopian troops as well as the plans to disarm the populace. Prime Minister Ghedi issued a decision to postpone the disarmament for an indefinite amount of time.

=== January 7, 2007 ===
- 1 Somali soldier, 1 civilian killed

Clashes broke out between Somali protesters and Ethiopian soldiers in the border town of Beledweyne after a town official was arrested for refusing to hand over a leading member of the Islamic Courts Union. Three people were reportedly injured.

A small skirmish has broken out in the Somali capital Mogadishu between Somali militiamen and the Ethiopian forces killing at least two persons and wounding two others. The clashes came after armed militiamen attacked military vehicles belonged to Ethiopian troops passing in front of the Sahafi hotel in southern Mogadishu. Both the dead and the injured were Somalis. The dead persons were a 13-year-old girl and a TFG soldier who died when his hand grenade accidentally exploded and one of the wounded was an old man who was in serious condition.

=== January 8, 2007 ===
On January 8, 2007 as the Battle of Ras Kamboni raged, TFG President Abdullahi Yusuf Ahmed entered Mogadishu for the first time since being elected. It was announced the government would be relocated to Villa Somalia, in Mogadishu, from its interim location at Baidoa. Prof. Ibrahim Hassan Addow, representative of the ICU, speaking from Yemen, said the Islamic Courts were ready to enter negotiations with the Transitional Federal Government. However, TFG President Abdullahi Yusuf Ahmed categorically refused to hold peace talks at this stage.

On January 8 it was reported that an AC-130 gunship belonging to the United States military had attacked suspected al-Qaeda operatives in Southern Somalia. Most casualties were said to be Islamic fighters. The aircraft flew out of its base in Djibouti. Many bodies were spotted on the ground, but the identity of the dead or wounded was not yet established. The targeted leaders were tracked by the use of unmanned aerial vehicles (UAVs) as they headed south from Mogadishu starting on December 28. One attack was made well inland at Hayo (or Xayo, approx. Lat 0º28' N, Long 41º49' E), a village halfway between Afmadow and Dhobley. It was also reported that the aircraft carrier USS Dwight D. Eisenhower had been moved into striking distance. Other named US Navy vessels joining the maritime cordon included the USS Anzio and the amphibious landing ship USS Ashland.

On January 8, 2007, to the north of Ras Kamboni, elsewhere in Badhadhe province, an Ethiopian force intercepted Islamist forces in the area of the Kenyan border town of Amuma, Garissa district. Seven vehicles were destroyed. A platoon of Kenyan border police were in the area to enforce the border closure. In Afmadow province, Ethiopia launched airstrikes against targets near Afmadow and Dhobley.

=== January 9, 2007 ===
- 1 Ethiopian soldier killed

On January 9, 2007, seven Pakistani members of the Tabliq (Tablighi Jamaat) were arrested in Mogadishu near the Presidential Palace of Villa Somalia, causing a local protest. Ethiopian and Somali troops were attacked in Mogadishu for the second time in a week with one soldier reportedly being killed and others wounded. A young girl was also wounded in the attack.

An insurgent attack on government barrack began at 7:30pm, Tuesday, near KM4 (Kilometer 4 Street), which resulted in one soldier dead and six wounded. The firefight lasted an hour.

On January 9, it was reported U.S. special forces and CIA operatives are working with Ethiopian troops on the ground in operations inside Somalia, and have been involved in numerous missions since the beginning of the war. US forces have been operating from Galkayo within Somalia, and from Camp Lemonnier, an American camp established in Djibouti following 9/11.

=== January 10, 2007 ===
- 1 Somali soldier killed

On January 10, 2007, due to the barrack attack, significant street fighting broke out in Mogadishu stretching from dawn to afternoon in a multi-party daylight clash between troops of the national government, Ethiopian soldiers, Islamic insurgents and local militias. Government soldiers cordoned off areas of the city and began a house-to-house search for weapons. At Medina hospital, 15 people, including three government soldiers, had been admitted for gunshot wounds over the past 24 hours, and patients overflowed the hospital's 65 beds. At least one TFG soldier was reported to be dead at the end of the day.

On January 10, chief of staff to the Somali president, Abdirizak Hassan, stated that the US claimed Al Qaeda suspect Fazul Abdullah Mohammed, one of the FBI's most wanted terrorists, was killed in the AC-130 attack on January 8, as detailed by a US intelligence report. Earlier, a US military official reported that Ethiopian forces provided the targeting information needed for the attack. The official also said that five to 10 people were killed in the airstrikes. However, a Somali official countered that US airstrikes killed 31 civilians. At least four more AC-130 airstrikes were said to have hit Ras Kamboni. Somali politician Abdirashid Mohamed Hidig toured the area and spoke of 50 killed in the attacks. He said additional targets hit include Hayo, Garer, Bankajirow and Badmadowe. The U.S. government denied the additional attacks were made by the US. Ethiopian aircraft are also known to be operating in the combat area. The verification of the death of Mohammed followed private comments made by US Defence Department officials that further airstrikes were possibly being planned. A second planned attack was reportedly called off after losing track of the target.

=== January 11, 2007 ===
Unknown Somali fighters launched grenades into Hotel Ambassador in Mogadishu, exchanging gunfire with Somali and Ethiopian troops positioned inside the hotel. One of the wounded soldiers is in critical condition and is a personal body guard of Gen. Ali Madobe, the Somali national police chief.

On January 11, the American ambassador to Kenya said that the US claimed Al Qaeda suspect Fazul Abdullah Mohammed was actually still alive and that none of the Al Qaeda members were killed in the air attack but some members of the ICU were killed.

=== January 12, 2007 ===
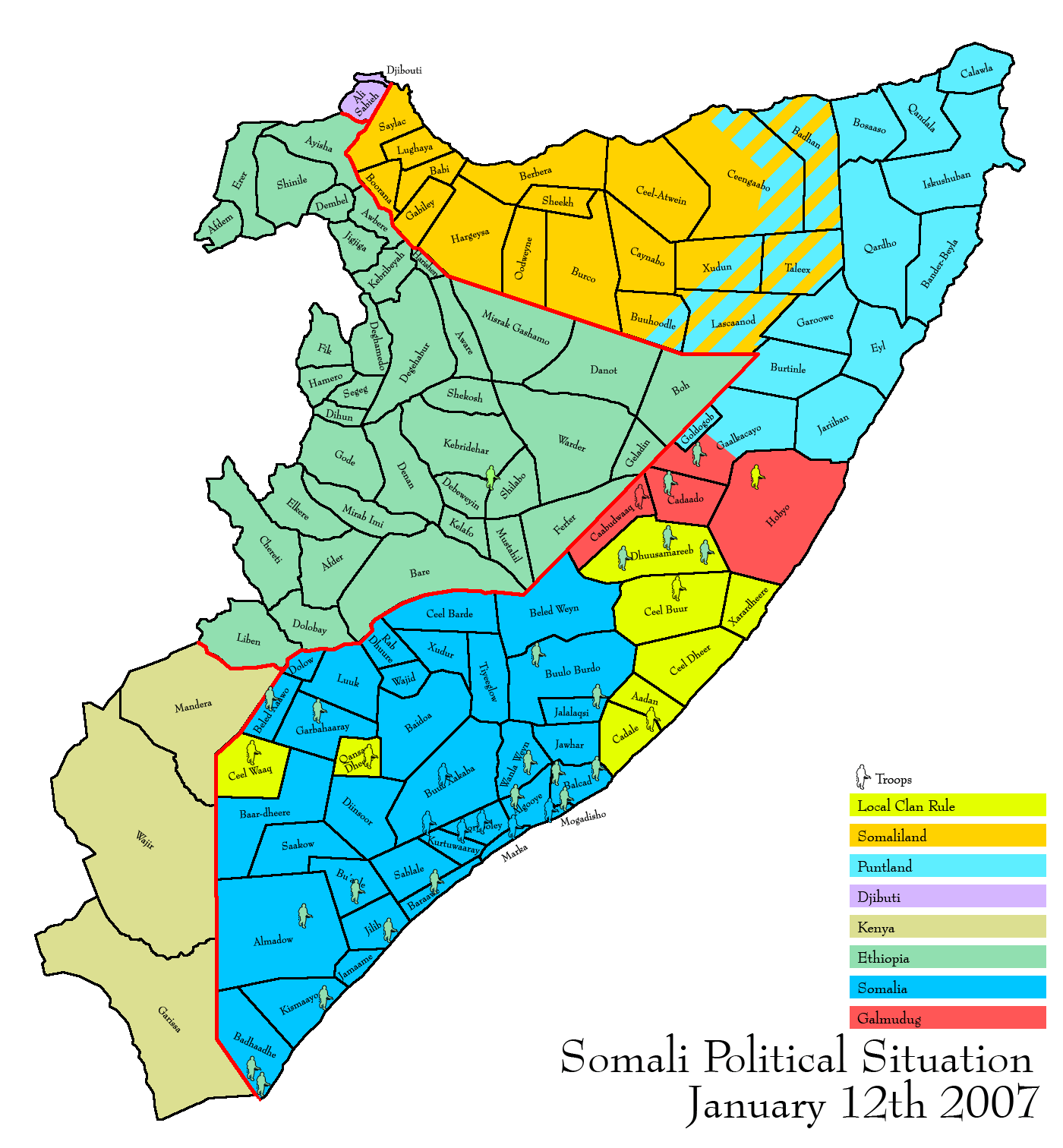

- 8 insurgents killed

Up to seven people were killed when the militiamen of clan leader Mohamed Afrah Qanyare fought members of a rival clan who were guarding the presidential palace. All of the dead were said to be Qanyare's fighters. There were reports that the fighting was sparked by a parking dispute involving an armored vehicle.

According to Oxfam, a British-based aid agency, 70 herdsmen were killed in recent air raids targeting Islamic militants.

On January 12, TFG Defense Minister Barre Aden Shirre Hiiraale announced Ras Kamboni had fallen to the Somali government and Ethiopian forces after five days of heavy fighting. Remnants of the Islamist forces were being pursued into the nearby forests and fighting would continue. A small team of US forces investigated the site of the US gunship attack to search for information about the identity and fate of the targeted individuals.

In fighting in Mogadishu 8 Islamist fighters are killed.

=== January 13, 2007 ===
- 9 civilians killed

On January 13, nine people were ambushed and killed in Biyo Adde, 50 km northeast of Jowhar. Revenge by a sub-clan was cited as the motive.

=== January 14, 2007 ===
- 13 civilians killed

Multiple attacks against Ethiopian and Somali government troops broke out in the capital with reports of one dead government soldier and three others who had their weapons confiscated after an unknown group of militiamen attacked a police station in the Huriwa district. Another attack on a convoy of Ethiopian and government soldiers happened in the former Islamic Courts stronghold of Ifka Halane in Mogadishu.

At least 13 were killed and 12-18 wounded in a militia clash between the Murasade and Hawdle tribes in Goobo, between Hiran and Galgadud regions. Government forces were dispatched to the town.

In Garissa Kenya, police arrested 7 Somalis, suspected of being fleeing Islamic militiamen heading towards Nairobi. One was wounded. 10 others escaped.

=== January 15, 2007 ===
- 1 Somali soldier, 1 civilian killed

On January 15, a gun battle lasting at least an hour killed at least two people in Eimiska, a northeastern neighborhood of Mogadishu. Attackers in two pickup trucks fired rocket propelled grenades at an Ethiopian and government convoy. One man known to have been killed was thought to be deaf and therefore did not respond when soldiers ordered him to go back. The same day, the TFG closed the radio stations for Shabelle Radio, Horn Afrik, IQK, and the television station al-Jazeera in Mogadishu without explanation.

On January 15, it was reported a British SAS team was also on the ground at the Kenyan border looking for the fleeing Al Qaeda suspects.

=== January 17, 2007 ===
On January 17, 2007, conflicting reports emerged over whether Sheikh Sharif Ahmed had been arrested near the Dadaab refugee camp in the Garissa district of Kenya. Also today, a U.S. official in a press conference said she believed the U.S. AC-130 raid had killed eight soldiers of Aden Hashi Farah Ayro, head of an Islamist militia. Ayro is believed to have been wounded in the attack and perhaps killed.

Also on that day, the Assistant Deputy Secretary of Defense for African affairs, Theresa Whelan, clarified the airstrike conducted on January 8 was not the work of the CJTF-HOA, but of another force which she did not specify. The target of the strike was confirmed to be Aden Hashi Farah Ayro, who was believed wounded or possibly dead, while eight members of his group were killed in the attack.

The US ambassador to Kenya, Michael Ranneberger, said the US pledged $40 million to support the deployment of the IGASOM peacekeeping force for Somalia.

=== January 19, 2007 ===
On January 19, 2007 the pro-Islamic Courts Union website featured a video describing the reformation of the ICU into the Popular Resistance Movement in the Land of the Two Migrations (PRM). On January 24, Sheikh Abdikadir was announced to be commander of the PRM in the Banadir region.

On the same day, the AMISOM mission was formally defined and approved by the African Union at the 69th meeting of the Peace and Security Council.

=== January 22, 2007 ===
On January 22, Malawi agreed to send a half-battalion to a battalion (ranging widely anywhere between approximately 400 to 1,200 troops) for a peacekeeping mission to Somalia.

=== January 23, 2007 ===
On January 23, 2007, Ethiopia began withdrawing from Mogadishu and all other areas in Somalia.

=== January 24, 2007 ===
On January 24, the U.S. admitted to have made a second airstrike, but did not confirm the exact date or location of the strike. Also on that day, Nigeria pledged a battalion (a force between 770 and 1,100 troops) to join the Somali peacekeeping mission.

=== January 25, 2007 ===
- 1 Ethiopian soldier killed

On January 25, 2007 an Ethiopian soldier was killed and another seriously injured in Karamiyo, one of the last towns to fall to the Ethiopians. It is estimated that more than 3,000 Islamist gunmen have gone into hiding.

=== January 31, 2007 ===
On January 31, the PRM released a video warning African Union peacekeepers to avoid coming to Somalia, claiming "Somalia is not a place where you will earn a salary - it is a place where you will die."

=== February 1, 2007 ===
The USS Dwight D. Eisenhower was withdrawn by the US and redeployed to the Persian Gulf. Other ships of its carrier strike group, the USS Bunker Hill and the USS Ashland remain off the coast of Somalia.

Also on February 1, Burundi committed to the peacekeeping mission, pledging up to 1,000 troops.

=== February 2, 2007 ===
On February 2, the United Nations Security Council welcomed the advent of the African Union and IGAD-led peacekeeping mission.

=== February 9, 2007 ===
On February 9, a gathering of 800 Somali demonstrators in north Mogadishu, where Islamist support was strongest, burned U.S., Ethiopian, and Ugandan flags in protest of the proposed peacekeeping mission. A masked representative of the resistance group, the Popular Resistance Movement in the Land of the Two Migrations, said Ethiopian troops would be attacked in their hotels; the same group had made a video warning peace-keepers to avoid coming to Somalia. By this date, Uganda, Nigeria, Ghana, Malawi and Burundi had committed to the peacekeeping mission, but the total force was about half of the proposed 8,000-strong force. Uganda had pledged 1,400 troops and some armored vehicles for a mission lasting up to 9 months, and the AU had pledged $11.6 million.

=== February 15, 2007 ===
On February 15, in Houston, Texas, U.S. citizen Daniel Joseph Maldonado (Daniel Aljughaifi) was charged with "training from a foreign terrorist organization and conspiring to use an explosive device outside the United States." He had been extradited by Kenyan authorities after he fled there. In the charges, it was alleged he took part in training at camps near Kismayo and Jilib where members of al-Qaeda were present and was willing to become a suicide bomber if he became wounded.

In Mogadishu, a mortar and rocket barrage killed at least one person and wounded more than 10. At least five mortar rounds were fired at the Mogadishu seaport. Three landed on the adjacent beach where a teenage boy was killed and others were wounded. Another mortar round landed in the Black Sea neighborhood of Mogadishu. Ethiopian troops, barracked in the old Somali National University campus, responded with a rocket counterattack. Six others were wounded around the city in scattered mortar attacks. It was the first night of violence after two mostly peaceful days in the city.

=== February 16, 2007 ===
On February 16, Uganda announced it would soon deploy 1,500 well-seasoned troops under the command of Major General Levi Karuhanga. The troops had been training for two years in preparation for the mission.

Elsewhere in Somalia on this day:

- Mogadishu - one man was killed after being robbed for his mobile phone, and a worker at the Libyan embassy was also shot and later died of his wounds. A former Defense Ministry compound, which had been occupied by civilians, was cleared and re-occupied by Somali troops. One man was injured after he pulled a gun on the troops.
- Baardheere - a gunman attacked two MSF Spain staff. MSF doctors and staff are in the town working to reopen the largest hospital, which had been closed for the past decade. The workers were uninjured. Local tribal leaders pledged their support for the work of MSF in the region.
- Kismayo - Deputy police commander Abdi Gaab announced that the police force of 1,500 police members securing the city had confiscated a collection of arms, including heavy rounds and explosives.

=== February 18, 2007 ===
- 1 Somali soldier, 4 insurgents killed

On February 18, 2007 Mogadishu witnessed its first car bomb, with four fatalities.

In an ambush in Mogadishu 1 TFG policeman was killed.

=== February 20, 2007 ===
- 16 civilians killed

On February 20, a series of mortar attacks left 16 dead and 42 wounded. The total wounded in mortar attacks in the capital since the beginning of the insurgency exceeded 90.

=== February 21, 2007 ===
- 1 civilian killed

A district commissioner was killed in Mogadishu.

=== February 27, 2007 ===
- 5 civilians killed

In various attacks in Mogadishu 5 people were killed, including a government-allied militia commander.

=== March 6, 2007 ===
- 2 insurgents, 1 civilian killed

In fighting in Mogadishu 2 insurgents and 1 civilian were killed.

=== March 16, 2007 ===
- 7 civilians killed

In fighting in Mogadishu 7 civilians were killed.

=== March 23, 2007 ===
Truce between Ethiopian military forces and tribal clans in Mogadishu.

A cargo plane, with 11 people on board, was 2007 Mogadishu TransAVIAexport Airlines Il-76 crash over Mogadishu. An Islamic group claims responsibility for the attack.

=== March 26, 2007 ===
Huge explosion in an Ethiopian military base in Mogadishu, Ethiopian soldiers respond with indiscriminate fire killing one civilian.

=== March 27, 2007 ===
Unknown gunmen kill the Somali military official Darud Bier in a mosque of Kismayo.

Combats between insurgents and Somali police in Beledweyne, two police men injured.

=== March 29, 2007 ===
At least 30 people died in south and north Mogadishu in violent fighting between Ethiopian forces and Somali insurgents. Ethiopian helicopters attacked rebel positions, while the insurgents were calling on the people of the city over the mosque loudspeakers to resist the Ethiopians. Among the killed were 15 Ethiopian soldiers, the rest were civilians.

=== March 30, 2007 ===
Islamic insurgents shot down an Ethiopian Mi-24 military helicopter in Mogadishu.

=== April 1, 2007 ===
A truce brokered by influential Hawiye-clan elders between the government and the Council of Islamic Courts failed to stop fighting that has left the streets of Mogadishu strewn with dead bodies.

=== April 4, 2007 ===
Amnesty International feared resumption of the indiscriminate attacks that have taken place in the recent days in Mogadishu, resulting in the killing of over 400 civilians. The organization demanded Somalia's President Abdullahi Yusuf Ahmed, Ethiopian Prime Minister Meles Zenawi, and all armed groups to ensure that their forces strictly abide by international humanitarian law and take all necessary measures to protect civilians.

=== April 21, 2007 ===
At least 165 people have been killed in Mogadishu since April 17, in combats between Ethiopian military forces and Somali insurgents.

=== April 24, 2007 ===
A car bomb exploded outside the Ambassador Hotel in Mogadishu, killing 11 people.

A suicide microbus bomb killed 6 people in an Ethiopian military base in Afgoi, 30 km south of Mogadishu.

=== April 25, 2007 ===
A missile hit a hospital ward, in Mogadishu, packed with civilians wounded in fighting between Islamic insurgents and Ethiopian troops allied to the Somali government.

=== April 26, 2007 ===
Prime Minister Ali Mohammed Ghedi of Somalia's transitional government is claiming victory over insurgents in Mogadishu. But a former member of parliament, Omar Hashi, now in exile in Eritrea and allied with some Islamists fighting the transitional government, denies that the transitional government is in control of the volatile capital.

=== April 28, 2007 ===
Clashes between U.S. backed-Ethiopian forces and fighters aligned with the Islamic Courts Union in the capital Mogadishu are being described as some of the heaviest fighting in the city's history. Humanitarian Crisis Worsens in Somalia: Over three hundred people had been killed over the past two weeks. This comes just three weeks after another series of battles claimed at least a thousand lives.

=== May 3, 2007 ===
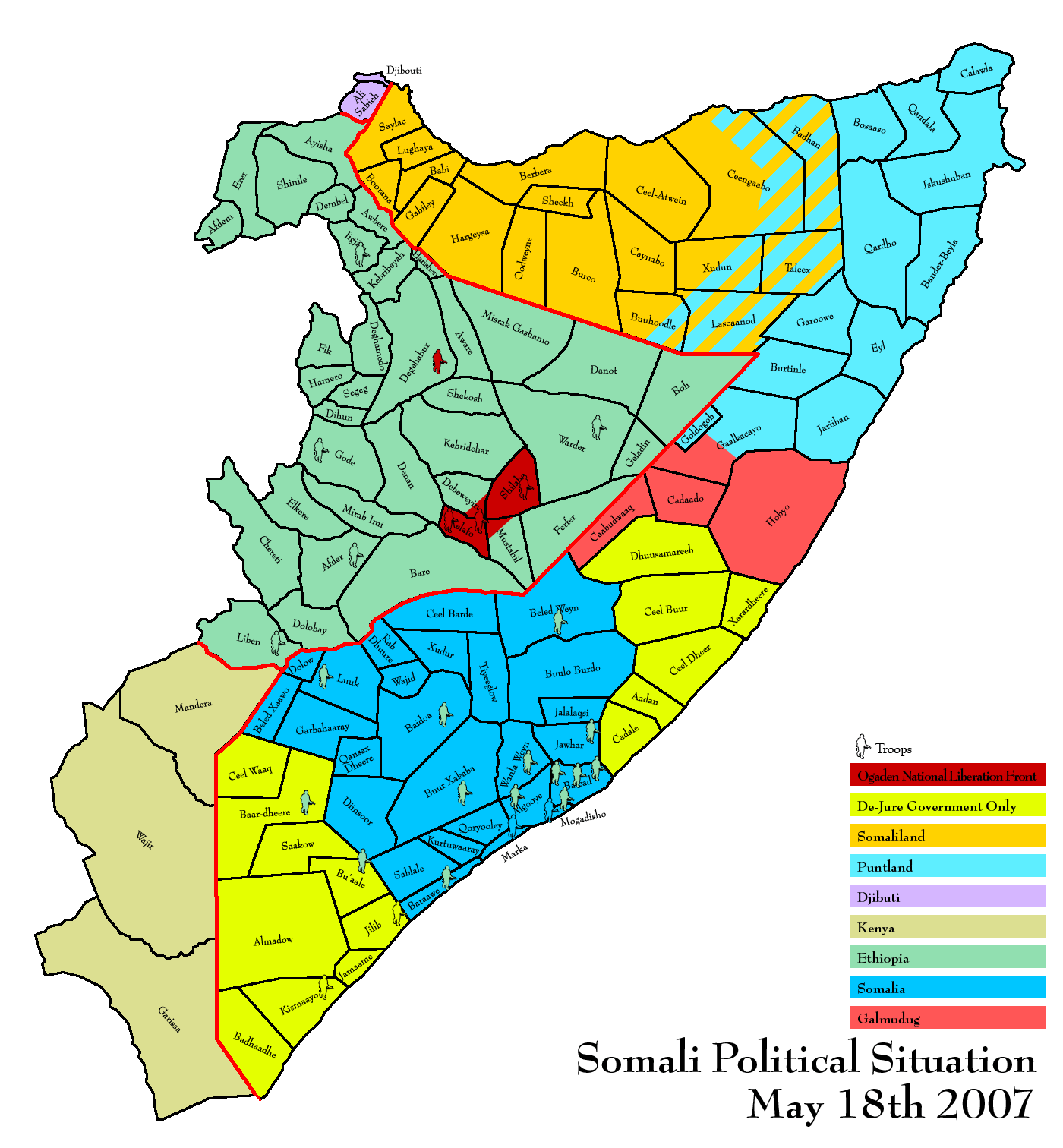

Human Rights Watch documented how Kenya and Ethiopia had turned the region into Africa's own version of Guantanamo Bay, replete with kidnappings, extraordinary renditions, secret prisons and large numbers of "disappeared".

=== May 16, 2007 ===
- 4 Ugandan soldiers, 1 civilian killed

A roadside bomb hits a convoy of Ugandan peacekeepers in Mogadishu, killing four and wounding five Ugandan soldiers. A child is also killed in the attack.

=== May 17, 2007 ===
- 1 Somali soldier killed

A TFG soldier is killed in an ambush in Mogadishu.

=== June 2, 2007 ===
- 12 insurgents killed

In fighting in Bargal 12 Islamist insurgents are killed.

=== June 2, 2007 ===
- 3 civilians killed

A US warship attacked a village in northeastern Somalia, killing 8 Islamist insurgents.

At least 3 people were killed in several shooting attacks in Mogadishu.

=== June 3, 2007 ===
- 7 civilians, 1 insurgent killed

A suicide truck bomb exploded in front of Somali prime minister's house, killing 7 people and injuring dozens.

An Ethiopian military convoy was attacked by a roadside bomb in the north of Mogadishu.

=== June 22, 2007 ===
- 7 Somali soldiers killed

In fighting between rival army units in Kismayo 6 people were killed.

In Mogadishu an army officer was killed and a second injured when their vehicle was hit by a roadside explosion.

=== June 26, 2007 ===
- 2 Ethiopian soldiers, 9 civilians killed

Two Ethiopian soldiers were killed and two wounded in a roadside bombing in Mogadishu, another two people were killed earlier in the week in Mogadishu and 5 civilians were killed and 8 wounded in a grenade attack on a Somalia military convoy which was passing near Mogadishu's Bakara market yesterday.

In a separate attack two Somalis working for the International Medical Corps relief agency were killed late Wednesday in El-Berde.

=== July 29, 2007 ===
- 2 Somali soldiers, 2 civilians killed

Two TFG soldiers and two civilians were killed when insurgents attacked a military patrol in Mogadishu's Bakara market.

=== July 31, 2007 ===
- 1 Somali soldier, 3 civilians killed

40 heavily armed fighters attacked an Ethiopian base close to the Somali capital, Mogadishu. At least four people die in the fighting, with heavy machine guns and rocket-propelled grenades.

=== August 1, 2007 ===
- 4 Ethiopian soldiers, 6 civilians killed

Four Ethiopian soldiers were killed after their base close to the volatile Somali capital Mogadishu came under rocket and machine-gun attack from Islamists. Also six people are killed by a remote controlled bomb in Mogadishu.

=== August 9, 2007 ===
- 9 civilians killed

At least nine Somali nomads were killed in El Bur district, central Somalia, on Thursday by armed clan militiamen, witnesses and elders said

- 2 Somali police officers, 5 civilians killed

Seven people including two police officers were killed in Mogadishu.

=== August 10, 2007 ===
- 3 civilians killed, 3 TFG government officials, 2 Somali soldiers killed

Heavily armed insurgents attacked a military base and a police station with mortars and heavy machine guns. At least three civilians died.

=== August 11, 2007 ===
- 2 civilians killed

2 journalists are killed in Mogadishu.

=== August 14, 2007 ===
- 11 clan-based government militiamen killed.

Fighting erupted in a remote village west of the Somali port city of Kismayo on Tuesday between clan fighters who battled in the same village last week, residents said. Fighters loyal to the Ogaden and Galje'l clans fought each other using rifles and other light weapons. At least 11 fighters were killed and 17 other people wounded in the second round of warfare, elders in Buur Gaabo village said by telephone.

- 31 civilians killed

Fighting across Mogadishu killed 31 civilians and injured another 60 civilians.

=== August 15, 2007 ===
- 4 Somali police officers

Assailants believed to be members of armed groups opposed to Somalia's transitional government and its Ethiopian allies have killed four police officers in the capital, Mogadishu, in continued fighting described by human rights organisations as mostly affecting civilians.

=== August 16, 2007 ===
- 3 Somali police officers

A roadside bomb in northern Mogadishu killed three police officers and wounded a large number of civilians.

=== August 17, 2007 ===
- 2 civilians killed

At least one person was reported dead Friday in a small village in southern Somalia after tens of people rushed on a building where an aid agency was distributing food, witnesses said. The United Nations' WFP aid agency was distributing food to refugee families in Kuntuwarey, a town in Lower Shabelle region. Some of the refugees had fled increasing violence in the capital Mogadishu between government troops and insurgents.

=== August 18, 2007 ===
- 2 civilians killed

Attacks in Mogadishu killed two civilians and injured four others.

- 12 civilians, 4 government militia killed

Fighting between two sub-clans in North-western Somalia left at least 16 people dead and 30 wounded.

=== August 19, 2007 ===
- 1 civilian killed

In another high-profile assassination, Moallim Harun Moallim Yusuf was gunned down near his home yesterday evening. Moallim Yusuf was a clan elder renowned for negotiating peaceful settlements between warring clans over the past 17 years of civil war.

=== August 21, 2007 ===
- 2 civilians killed

A landmine detonated outside of Mogadishu killing two civilians. Other violence in Somalia left nine civilians and a Somalia TFG soldier wounded.

=== August 22, 2007 ===
- 1 Ethiopian soldier, 1 Somali soldier killed

Gunmen shot and killed a Somali soldier south of Mogadishu at the Yaaqshiid's Fagah intersection and an Ethiopian convoy in Mogadishu was attacked killed 1 Ethiopian soldier and injuring 10 other people.

=== August 24, 2007 ===
- 7 insurgents killed, 1 TFG Somali police officer killed

Fighting in Huriwa district killed 7 insurgents and 1 TFG government police officer.

=== August 26, 2007 ===
- 3 civilians killed

A roadside bomb in Mogadishu killed two students and an elderly civilian.

=== August 28, 2007 ===
- 1 Somali police officer, 4 insurgents, 2 civilians killed

A police officer received financial reward after shooting dead an insurgent that was about to toss a grenade. Police officers at a north Mogadishu substation killed three insurgents and captured two and one police officer was killed along with two civilians in several explosions in the Bakara market.

=== September 1, 2007 ===
- 1 Somali soldiers, 2 civilians killed

A roadside bomb south of Mogadishu claimed the life of one Somali soldier and two businessmen were shot and killed in Bakara market.

=== September 2, 2007 ===
- 2 Somali soldiers, 2 civilians killed

Insurgents attacked a government station but withdrew after the Somali soldiers were reinforced by Ethiopian soldiers. Two Somali soldiers and two civilians were killed in the fighting.

=== September 3, 2007 ===
- 4 civilians killed

Fighting in Galgadud region killed one civilian and three other civilians were killed in Mogadishu.

=== September 5, 2007 ===
- 4 civilians killed, 2 Somali soldiers and 2 insurgents killed

Heavy fighting in the Bakara market killed 2 Somali soldiers and 2 insurgents but claimed the lives of four civilians in the cross-fire.

=== September 9, 2007 ===
- 3 civilians killed

A roadside bomb meant for a passing TFG convoy killed three civilians. No one was hurt or killed in the convoy.

=== September 10, 2007 ===
- 12 civilians killed

Fighting in Mogadishu killed 12 civilians and injured many more in different hot-spots. No known government or insurgent casualties.

=== September 11, 2007 ===
- 1 UN official killed

A WHO officer was shot and killed by two insurgents.

=== September 13, 2007 ===
- 5 Somali soldiers killed

In fighting in Mogadishu 5 TFG soldiers were killed.

An opposition government, consisting of members of the former Islamic Courts Union (ICU) and other Somali elements met and formed in Asmara, Eritrea. Somalia's interior minister, Mohamed Mohamud Guled, ridiculed the meeting and the opposition forces, saying "We are really close to eradicating them."

=== September 14, 2007 ===
- 4 Somali police officers, 3 civilians killed

Insurgents attacked police by SOS hospital killing four police officers and three civilians>

=== September 15, 2007 ===
- 1 civilian killed

Fighting in Bakara market killed 1 civilian and injured two others.

=== September 16, 2007 ===
- 1 Somali soldier, 1 civilian killed

A lone gunman shot and killed clan elder Mohamud Hassan and a security official in Bakara market.

- 1 insurgent, 3 civilians killed

An insurgent tried to kidnap a child of a government official in Kismayu and in the resulting firefight killed two civilians before dying of his injuries. A third civilian was shot to death by soldiers. The boy was released unharmed.

=== September 17, 2007 ===
- 2 Somali civilians

Artillery clash between Somaliland separatists and Puntland forces in Sool killed two civilians.

=== September 22, 2007 ===
- 1 Somali intelligence officer, 1 police officer killed

A Somali intelligence official was gunned down in Mogadishu Saturday evening by two suspected insurgents, sources said. The two attackers escaped after using pistols to kill Abdullahi Odohow at a small market in Yaaqshiid district. Odohow, who was a senior official with the Somali national security agency, did not have armed guards with him at the time of the fatal attack. Elsewhere one police officer was killed in an explosion in Bakara market.

=== September 23, 2007 ===
- 3 Somali soldiers killed

In fighting in Mogadishu 3 TFG soldiers were killed.

=== September 24, 2007 ===
- 4 Somali soldiers, 2 TFG government officials killed

Fighting in northern Mogadishu killed four soldiers and in southern Mogadishu insurgents shot dead two TFG government officials.

=== September 26, 2007 ===
- 5 TFG Somali police, 3 insurgents killed

Insurgents attacked the district commander in Huriwa district killing the commander and wounding his second-in-command. A police counterattack killed 3 insurgents and four fellow officers.

=== September 27, 2007 ===
- 1 Somali soldier, 2 civilians killed

In Bakara market insurgents tossed grenades at a Somali government patrol and shot dead one soldier and two civilians.

=== September 29, 2007 ===
- 45 Somali soldiers, 100 insurgents, 4 civilians killed

Insurgents attacked three police stations and two Ethiopian bases in Mogadishu which led to the death according to some reports of 100 insurgents and 45 Somali soldiers and policemen. Three civilians were killed also.

- 2 TFG police officers, 3 civilians killed

Fighting overnight at a Mogadishu sub-station killed 2 TFG police officers and three civilians even though government forces claimed no police had been killed.

=== September 30, 2007 ===
- 1 Somali soldier, 3 civilians killed

One Colonel in the TFG government was killed in Bakara market and three other civilians were killed in other incidents in Mogadishu.

- 5 civilians killed

Troops in Afgoya shot and killed civilians looking for food.

=== October 2, 2007 ===
- 2 insurgents killed

Local police engaged unidentified militiamen in southern Somalia Monday night in a two-hour-long battled that killed at least two fighters, sources said. The port town of Marka, provincial capital of Lower Shabelle, was relatively quiet all day Tuesday as people largely stayed inside their homes for fear of more armed clashes. Last night's attack erupted around 1 am local time at the town's southern checkpoint where police defended themselves from the militiamen. Five others, including police officers, were wounded in the gun fight.

=== October 4, 2007 ===
- 1 Somali soldier, 1 insurgent killed, 3 civilians, 1 Ethiopian soldier killed

In fighting in Mogadishu a policeman and an insurgent were killed. An explosion in Bakaar marketplace killed three civilians and an Ethiopian soldier was killed while on patrol.

=== October 5, 2007 ===
- 2 Somali officials, 2 civilians killed

=== October 7, 2007 ===
- 3 Somali soldiers killed

Insurgents attacked a Somali Army General in south Mogadishu and successfully assassinated him, a bodyguard and their military driver.

- 1 Somali soldier killed

A Somali security official was killed in Mogadishu, witnesses said Sunday, as Islamists insurgents brought into their ranks a battle-tested Afghan-trained commander. Gunmen shot dead Ahmed Hareed, a district official for Somali National Security Agency, overnight in the south of the lawless capital, the latest in a string of attacks targeting government employees and sympathisers.

=== October 11, 2007 ===
- 3 Ethiopian soldiers, 1 insurgent killed

A suicide bomber attacked a checkpoint in Baidoa killing 3 Ethiopian soldiers.

=== October 16, 2007 ===
- 3 civilians killed

A nighttime mortar exchange in Mogadishu killed three people hiding in a restaurant and sent seven other civilians to hospital.

=== October 17, 2007 ===
- 1 Somali soldier killed

Somali soldiers exchanged gunfire with TFG militiamen in Kismayo over an illegal checkpoint resulting in the death of 1 soldier, wounding of two civilians and the arrest of one gunman.

Somalia's Northern regions, which until recently enjoyed a relative peace, are on the verge of entering an era of internecine clan warfare similar to, and may be worse than, what has plagued the southern part of the country

for over a decade.

The Hargeisa-based clan-driven secessionists' northern enclave of Somaliland, in the early hours of October 15, 2007, launched unprovoked armed aggression on the peaceful town of Las Anod, the capital of Sool region in the northern pro-unity State of Puntland. This naked aggression caused the death of at least 12 people and displacement of large residents of the city, as well as injuring unknown number of civilians. The local people are in arms defending their families and their properties against these invaders from their distant stronghold, Hargeisa, which is more than 900 Kilometers from Las Anod.

=== October 18, 2007 ===
- 3 Somali soldiers, 1 civilian killed

A police sub-commander and two bodyguards were assassinated in Mogadishu and a civilian was killed in a grenade attack.

=== October 19, 2007 ===
- 1 Puntland police officer, 2 insurgents killed

In Bossasso after a day-long stand-off gunfire erupted killing two suspected Islamic insurgents in Puntland and injuring four police officers, resulting in one of them dying in hospital.

=== October 21, 2007 ===
- 17 civilians killed

17 civilians are killed in heavy fighting in Mogadishu.

- 7 Ethiopian soldiers, 2 insurgents, 6 civilians killed

Fighting overnight in Northern Mogadishu killed seven Ethiopian soldiers throughout northern mogadishu as well as two armed men, and six civilians.

=== October 22, 2007 ===
- 9 Somali soldiers dead

Fighting between rival government forces in Lower Shabelle killed three soldiers and wounded three others. Reinforcements began to arrive however a vehicle roll-over in Wanla Weyn resulted in the deaths of six more government soldiers.

=== October 23, 2007 ===
- 2 civilians dead

Fighting at Mogadishu docks killed two civilians, and injured six others along with three Ugandan peacekeepers.

=== October 25, 2007 ===
- 15 civilians killed

At least 15 civilians, including women and children, were killed in a bus explosion in Mogadishu's northern district of Yaqshiid. The explosion occurred when the bus drove over an IED (improvised explosive device) or landmine while traveling to the Suuqa Holaha district in northern Mogadishu on Wednesday.

- 4 civilians dead

An explosion in a central Somali town left four civilians dead and 15 wounded.

=== October 26, 2007 ===
- 2 Somali soldiers killed

Two Somali soldiers were killed and eight others wounded in two separate bombings.

=== October 27, 2007 ===
- 7 Ethiopian soldiers, 11 civilians killed, 2 insurgents killed

Nine civilians and seven Ethiopian soldiers are killed in fighting in Mogadishu.

- 2 Somali soldiers killed, 2 TFG policemen killed

Fighting in Marka killed four government troops in an inter-governmental clash.

=== October 28, 2007 ===
- 5 civilians killed

Ethiopian soldiers opened fire on demonstrators in Mogadishu killing three and in other incidents across the city two more civilians were killed.

=== October 29, 2007 ===
- 1 insurgent killed

Fighting in Mogadishu has killed one insurgent.

=== October 31, 2007 ===
- 2 civilians killed

Two civilians were killed in various attacks across Mogadishu

- 2 pirates killed

Two pirates were killed off of Somalia's coast when they tried to attack a North Korean cargo vessel.

=== November 1, 2007-November 6, 2007 ===
- 5 Ethiopian, 1 Somali soldier, 5 civilians killed

In various reported clashes 5 Ethiopian and 1 TFG soldier and 5 civilians are killed.

=== November 14, 2007 ===
- 10 civilians killed

A landmine exploded in Northern Somalia killing 10 civilians.

=== November 18, 2007 ===
- 5 civilians killed

A landmine explosion and subsequent gun attack in Mogadishu killed 5 civilians and injured dozens.

=== November 21, 2007 ===
- 2 Somali soldiers killed

A governor's convoy was attacked in central Somalia killing 2 soldiers and wounding 2 others. The insurgents that set up the roadblock attack were able to get away from pursuing soldiers.

=== November 22, 2007 ===
- 3 civilians killed

Attacks in Mogadishu have killed three civilians.

=== November 26, 2007 ===
- 2 Ethiopian soldiers, 2 civilians killed

Insurgents attack an Ethiopian army patrol in Mogadishu and two Ethiopians were killed along with two civilians in the 15 minute fire-fight, including one university student.

=== November 29, 2007 ===
- 15 civilians killed

Fighting in the capital killed 15 civilians and an undisclosed number of Ethiopian soldiers and insurgents.

=== December 1, 2007 ===
- 2 Somali policemen, 3 civilians killed

Two policemen and three civilians are killed in fighting in Mogadishu.

=== December 3, 2007 ===
- 10 civilians killed

In Mogadishu a huge battle left 10 civilians dead and 15 wounded.

=== December 5, 2007 ===
- 2 Somali soldiers, 1 insurgent killed

In Beltwein an ambush has left 2 soldiers and 1 insurgent dead.

=== December 10, 2007 ===
- 2 civilians killed

An attack on a police roadblock in the capital has left 2 civilians dead and wounded 5 others.

=== December 11, 2007 ===
- 7 Somali militiamen, 3 civilians killed

Fighting between two sub-clans north of the capital have killed 10 people and wounded dozens.

=== December 12, 2007 ===
- 3 Somali soldiers, 2 civilians killed

Three Somali soldiers and two civilians are killed in fighting in Mogadishu.

=== December 13, 2007 ===
- 19 civilians killed

In mortar bombardment in Mogadishu 19 civilians are killed.

=== December 15, 2007 ===
- 1 Somali soldier killed

Insurgents took control of Ba'da village in central Somalia after killing one TFG soldier.

=== December 17, 2007 ===
- 4 civilians killed, 3 Somali soldiers and 1 insurgent killed.

In fighting in Mogadishu 2 civilians are killed. Twelve soldiers, including one Ethiopian, were wounded by a road-side bomb in Baidoa.

=== December 19, 2007 ===
- 3 civilians killed

At least three civilians are killed in fighting in Mogadishu.

=== December 20, 2007 ===
- 12 civilians killed

In mortar bombardment in Mogadishu 12 civilians are killed.

=== December 23, 2007 ===
- 5 civilians killed

A running gun battle killed five civilians as stray mortar shells from both side struck civilian residential complexes in Northern Mogadishu.

=== December 24, 2007 ===
- 1 civilians killed, 1 Somali soldier killed

In Baidoa a regional judge was shot dead and in an attack on a police officer's home one soldier was killed and two soldiers and two young children were lightly wounded.

=== December 27, 2007 ===
- 1 civilian killed

In fighting in Mogadishu's notorious Bakara market one civilian is killed.

=== December 29, 2007 ===
- 1 civilian killed

Mohamed Muhiyadin Ali, spokesman for Mogadishu Mayor Mohamed Dheere, was killed in a road-side bombing in the capital.

=== December 31, 2007 ===
- 8 civilians killed

In mortar bombardment in Mogadishu 8 civilians are killed.

- 2 Somali soldiers killed

A landmine explosion planted by insurgents in Southern Mogadishu has killed a TFG Colonel and his bodyguard.

== Foreign involvement ==
Several nations and organizations are involved with the war in Somalia.

Here is a brief summary.

=== African Union ===
The African Union has pledged troops to assist the TFG under the AMISOM peacekeeping mission.

=== Ethiopia ===
Ethiopia forces actively assisted the TFG in ousting the ICU from its position of military control of Somalia. They have pledged to leave as rapidly as possible and does not appear to be coordinated with planned African Union troop arrivals.

Nobody knows for sure how many Ethiopian troops are stationed in Somalia, and nobody knows how many Somalis have been killed as a result of the Ethiopian military intervention in Somalia. Ethiopia opened an embassy in Mogadishu next to the presidential palace on May 27, 2007. According to Human Rights Watch, Ethiopian forces backing the Somali transitional government violated the laws of war by widely and indiscriminately bombarding highly populated areas of Mogadishu with rockets, mortars and artillery. Its troops on several occasions specifically targeted hospitals and looted them of desperately needed medical equipment. Human Rights Watch also documented cases of Ethiopian forces deliberately shooting and summarily executing civilians.

=== Kenya ===
Kenya has sent forces to secure its border with Somalia and maybe a middle man between the TFG and former leaders of the ICU.

=== United Nations ===
Promises humanitarian relief.

Since June 15, 2007 a UN mission in Somalia focused on the needs of the hundreds of the displaced Somalis. Deadly clashes have forced 490,00 Somalis to flee Mogadishu between February 2007 and May 2007.

=== United States ===
The United States had assisted Somali, Ethiopian and Kenyan forces with intelligence, advisors and limited military strikes from bases in those countries and from Djibouti. They have offered money to support a peace keeping force. The involvement of the United States is part of their War on Terrorism and specifically al-Qaeda.

On February 23, 2007, The New York Times reported that the US government has been secretly training Ethiopian soldiers, for several years, in camps near the Ethiopia-Somalia border. Many of these soldiers participated in the Ethiopian invasion of Somalia. The Times quoted unnamed US government officials who said the training program and other support for Ethiopia's government began after a failed CIA effort to arm and finance Somali "warlords."

==== US intervention against Al Qaeda ====
Somali Prime Minister Gedi declared one of the key objectives of the offensive on Kismayo was the capture of three alleged al-Qaeda members, suspects wanted for the 1998 United States embassy bombings in East Africa: Fazul Abdullah Mohammed, Saleh Ali Saleh Nabhan and Abu Taha al-Sudani.

The United States Fifth Fleet's multinational maritime task force, Combined Task Force 150 (CTF-150), based out of Bahrain is patrolling off the Somali coast to prevent terrorists launching an "attack or to transport personnel, weapons or other material," said Commander Kevin Aandahl. The announcement did not say what particular ships comprised the cordon, but the task force includes vessels from Canada, France, Germany, Pakistan, the UK and the US. US ships of CTF-150 include the Arleigh Burke-class destroyer USS Ramage and the Ticonderoga-class cruiser USS Bunker Hill.

== See also ==
- Somalia War (2006–2009)
- Somali Civil War (2009–present)
- 2006 timeline of the War in Somalia
- 2008 timeline of the War in Somalia
- 2009 timeline of the War in Somalia
