= Battle of Baidoa =

2006 battle of the Somalia War

- Part of the Somalia War (2006–2009)
- Map of the military advances during the battle
Date	20–26 December 2006
Location	Bay, Somalia 3°04′28″N 43°50′07″E
Result	TFG/Ethiopian Victory: Beginning of a new phase of the Somali Civil War

Belligerents
(Somalia) Transitional Federal Government; Ethiopia	Islamic Courts Union

Strength
3,000+ TFG militia, 5,000+ Ethiopian soldiers	5,000+ Islamist militia

Casualties and losses
400 killed (Islamists claim)	1,000 Islamists dead (according to ethiopian sources); 800+ wounded
- Location within Somalia Battle of Baidoa (Africa)

The Battle of Baidoa began on 20 December 2006 when the Somali transitional federal government forces (TFG) allied with Ethiopian forces stationed there attacked advancing Islamic Courts Union (ICU) forces along with 500 alleged Eritrean troops and mujahideen arrayed against them.

The battle began with most reports depicting the government forces defecting and its position on the verge of collapse. The TFG, along with its allies in the Juba Valley Alliance (JVA), had certainly been on the retreat since the June offensives of the ICU. By the opening of the battle in December, Baidoa was invested with attacks coming in at least three directions.

Strong Ethiopian reinforcements rapidly changed the battle from one in which the TFG was on the defensive, through a strong series of counterattacks, to a decisive Ethiopian/TFG victory. Ethiopian armored, artillery, and air forces proved instrumental against the ICU's militia. The battle began the Ethiopian intervention against the ICU, in the 2006–2009 War in Somalia.

== Timeline ==
=== 20 December 2006 ===
On 20 December, heavy fighting broke out between Somali government troops and Islamists 25 km (16 mi) southeast of Baidoa where the Islamists claimed to have taken the government's military base in Daynuunay, a claim verified by residents in the area. Both sides accused one another of starting the violence. The conflict thereafter moved north to the Islamist stronghold in Moode Moode. Heavy weapons, including artillery, rockets and mortars were involved. Initial claims of casualties in this area were at least ten dead ICU militiamen and forty TFG soldiers wounded. Later claims of ICU casualties by the TFG were 71 Islamic soldiers dead and 221 injured, including two dead foreign fighters. The TFG claimed its own casualties were 3 dead and 7 wounded while the ICU claimed to have killed 7 government soldiers.

Fighting was reported on many fronts around the capital in Iidale village (55 km south of Baidoa) between a government reconnaissance team and the Islamists, Buulo Jadid (23 km north of Baidoa, also spelled Bullo Jadid) and Manaas (30 km southwest of Baidoa). One TFG death and numerous injured civilians were reported in Iidale. A later report raised the casualties to three soldiers killed and two injured. Thirteen trucks filled with Ethiopian reinforcements were reported en route to the fighting.

An AFP report mentioned the TFG claimed the attack on Iidale was led by Abu Taha al-Sudan, who is "wanted by Washington for carrying out attacks against its embassies in east Africa in 1998 and against an Israeli-owned hotel in Kenya in 2002."

This report raised the death toll from the artillery duel in Iidale to 12, and added that the government captured 30 "armed vehicles" (presumably technicals). It also contradicted the fall of Daynuunay to the ICU: "'The fighting is so fierce, but government forces are still controlling Daynuunay,' said Issak Adan Mursaley, a resident in Deynunay."

Meanwhile, an EU peace-brokering commission led by Louis Michel landed at Baidoa and then Mogadishu to meet, respectively, with the TFG and ICU representatives. Discussions yielded the agreement to meet in Khartoum, Sudan at an unspecified future date.

In Dadaab, Kenya, UN Deputy High Commissioner for Refugees, Wendy Chamberlin, said camps there accounted for 34,000 refugees fleeing the fighting and floods in Somalia, but that number is expected to grow to 80,000 if fighting continues. The World Food Programme (WFP) is attempting to provide relief, but floods and mud have hampered ground transportation. Sheikh Mohamed Ibrahim Bilal, speaking for the ICU, claimed fighting was going its way in Iidale and Buulo Jadid, saying they captured two technicals, killed nine soldiers and had taken prisoners in the fighting.

=== 21 December 2006 ===
On 21 December, Puntland President Adde Muse claimed ICU casualties were heavy in the fighting around Baidoa, sustaining 75 dead and 125 wounded, along with the loss of 30 vehicles burned or captured.

Also reported on the 21st, fighting in Iidale and Daynuunay was said to have started the prior morning and continued through the next day. No end to the fighting seemed imminent, as both sides continued to gather reinforcements. Casualty figures were unavailable, but the numbers were expected to be in the hundreds easily. The report went on to refute the ICU claim of victory, and stated that the government was again in possession of Iidale and had killed foreign fighters. The government also captured dozens of Islamist students who took up arms, sufficient in quantity to fill three lorries.

Sketchy, unattributed and unconfirmable reports stated Baidoa was on the "brink of collapse," and put the odds of fighters in the battle at 10-to-1 in favor of the ICU, with unconfirmed reports that the ICU are being provided with "high-tech weaponry, trainers and even fighters from many Muslim countries and Eritrea".

=== 22 December 2006 ===
By 22 December, TFG refuted assertions of collapse when it claimed to have inflicted 700 casualties on the ICU. The ICU claimed to have killed more than 200 government troops.

Contrary to ICU claims, the TFG said it was advancing. Reports put TFG troops in Safar Noles, on the approaches to Dinsoor.

Nearly 20 Ethiopian tanks were seen heading toward the front line. According to government sources Ethiopia has 20 T-55 tanks and four attack helicopters in Baidoa. The tanks were reported to be splitting into two groups heading towards fighting in Daynuunay and Iidale. Ethiopia may have as many as 50 tanks and other armored vehicles in the country.

Civilian casualties were reported as dozens killed and over 200 wounded.

To the north, in Mudug, 500 Ethiopian troops with eight tanks and 30 pickup trucks mounted with anti-aircraft guns were headed for Bandiradley, an Islamic Courts stronghold in central Somalia, according to witnesses and Islamic Courts officials. The Council of Islamic Courts said they would send ground troops to attack on Saturday, instead of fighting from a distance with heavy weapons as they have been doing so far. "Our troops have not started to attack. From tomorrow the attack will start," said Ibrahim Shukri Abuu-Zeynab, an Islamic Courts spokesman.

A TFG press release stated a unit of 500 Eritrean troops with artillery and other heavy weapons had reinforced Burhakaba. It claimed TFG troops had successfully destroyed an ICU force in Dinsoor, killing all the commanders, forcing the rest to surrender, and resulting in five foreign fighters committing suicide rather than face capture.

Nineteen bodies of Islamic fighters were found in Moode Moode by an Associated Press photographer. Reports that the ICU is forcing people to fight in Baidoa are claimed by a captured Islamic fighter.

The Council of Islamic Courts leader said that Somalia was in "a state of war" with the TFG and Ethiopia.

=== 23 December 2006 ===
Fighting continued in and around Baidoa, particularly at Iidale and Dinsoor; approximately 60 and 120 kilometres south of Baidoa, respectively. Iidale was reportedly captured by the Islamists.

Somali Information Minister of the TFG, Ali Jama, quoted that "The combined total from two fronts is over 500 Islamists killed since Wednesday". He later went on to report that most of those that were killed were children sent by the ICU to fight in the fronts east and south of Baidoa.

The ICU vowed all out war against the Ethiopian-backed transitional government, with Islamic commander Hassan Bullow stating that "This war is a religious obligation and we are here to fight for our religion against the enemies until we die." Islamic officials scorned the African Union and Arab League for doing nothing, saying "The world is silent today while Ethiopian forces are killing us inside our country, but tomorrow when we defeat them and chase them things will be changed, we will enter their territories and at that moment the world will shout". One resident saw Islamist fighters pushing toward Daynunay, the government's forward military base about 20 km (12 mi) southeast of its encircled base at Baidoa. "This morning, I heard sounds of rockets being fired from the frontline," Hassan Yusuf added. He said he saw three dead Ethiopian soldiers taken by Islamist fighters to a village close to Daynunay on Friday, while wounded Islamist fighters were being treated in nearby Buur Hakaba.

Islamists, for the first time, called upon international fighters to join their cause stating "We're saying our country is open to Muslims worldwide. Let them fight in Somalia and wage jihad, and God willing, attack Addis Ababa".

ICU defense chief, Sheik Yusuf Mohammed Siad Indho-adde, made a world-wide appeal for jihadists to come to Somalia, and claimed the ICU had taken Tiyoglow, Bakol province. Independent journalists were also shown that Iidale had been taken by the ICU, where they were shown bodies of Ethiopian troops. The TFG denied the claims as "cheap propaganda."

The International Committee of the Red Cross expressed their concern over those caught up in the fighting, quoting the figure of 200 wounded fighters being brought into hospitals on both sides.

=== 24 December 2006 ===
Islamist Abdulahi Gedow, commander of forces in Burhakaba, claimed to have seized Gasarta, less than 12 km south of Baidoa. This would be an advance of 10 km north of Daynunay (which is 22 km southeast of Baidoa). Islamists claimed that five Ethiopian tanks were destroyed.

TFG Defence Minister Barre Shire Hirale claimed to have retaken Iidale after a clash in which over 100 were killed.

In Kismayo, 1,000 men were said to be leaving for the battle, presumably to fight on behalf of the ICU.

Ethiopian airstrikes hit targets across Somalia, including Dinsoor and Burhakaba in the Bay region as part of the counter-offensive in the battle. To the north, Bandiradley in Mudug and Beledweyne in Hiiran were also struck.

TFG Deputy Defense Minister Salad Ali Jele stated government forces had advanced within three kilometres of Bur-Hakaba and were poised to re-capture the town.

A Somalian website claimed that thousands of angry people rallied in the capital of Mogadishu in protest of the Ethiopian air strikes. The people took to the streets of Mogadishu, forcing business centers to close down and send militia to the front. It also claimed that hundreds of volunteers were registering to join the Islamists.

=== 25 December 2006 ===
Ethiopian airstrikes hit the airports at Mogadishu and Bali-Dogle. The latter airport lies 115 km northwest of Mogadishu in the district of Wanlaweyne about half-way between the capital and the front lines at Burhakaba. At least one person was reported dead and others wounded in the Mogadishu attack. The Islamic Courts tightened security in the capital as a result.

Ethiopian forces were reported to have taken both Beledweyne and Buuloburde in Hiran, with unconfirmed reports that "hundreds of Ethiopian tanks" were moving along the road towards Jowhar. This presents a threat of a major flanking of ICU positions in Tiyoglow and Burhakaba by striking towards the Middle Shabelle area. The Ethiopian forces were accompanied by Somali warlord Mohamed Omar Habeb 'Mohamed Dhere,' who wished to reestablish his control over Jowhar.

Ethiopian forces had also reportedly encircled both Dinsoor and Burhakaba. Fighting had advanced near Dinsoor to Rama-Addey. The TFG asserted it was within a few kilometres of capturing Burhakaba.

The ICU's "commando-type arm" under the command of veteran of Afghanistan, Adan Ayrow was said to be giving stiff resistance. Yet late in the day, fighting was reported within Dinsoor itself. Dinsoor resident Mohammed Hassan reported that Ethiopian forces had taken the town.

=== 26 December 2006 ===
ICU forces reportedly abandoned their positions in Burhakaba and Dinsoor after days of heavy fighting, leaving behind a number of heavy weapons and other military equipment. Witnesses reported that ICU fighters were retreating from the Battle of Baidoa on numerous fronts and returning to Mogadishu in convoys. Islamic councilman Mohamoud Ibrahim Suley confirmed the withdrawal. Troops were also reported to have withdrawn to Daynuunay. Ethiopian troops arrived in Burhakaba after the Islamists vacated it. An Ethiopian government spokesman also confirmed that Ethiopian troops also arrived in Dinsoor unopposed. Despite this, local militiamen were seen by witnesses to be stealing boxes of food and medicine, further hampering any humanitarian efforts. Airstrikes also continued, this time on Leego, just east of Burhakaba. Three people were reportedly killed in the space of thirty minutes.

Ethiopia's Prime Minister, Meles Zenawi, announced Ethiopia would likely withdraw its troops within a few weeks. He said their main goal was to damage the ICU's military capabilities, sense of invincibility and ensure a more balanced setting for peace talks. The United States also announced it would support Ethiopian military operations, saying the country has "genuine security concerns," although it was unclear in what capacity the US would support the nation. The United Nations envoy to Somalia has urged an end to the fighting, and Qatar, the current President of the UN Security Council, has proposed a draft statement calling for an immediate cease-fire and the withdrawal of all international forces. Other nations, such as the US, Britain, France and Russia, have objected to the statement, saying peace talks and agreement are necessary before troops can withdraw.

== See also ==
- Military history of Africa
