= 2005 in Somalia =

- Decades: 1980s; 1990s; 2000s; 2010s; 2020s
- See also: History of Somalia; List of years in Somalia

The following lists events that happened during 2005 in Somalia.

== Incumbents ==
- President: Abdullahi Yusuf Ahmed
- Prime Minister: Ali Mohammed Ghedi

== Events ==
=== January ===
- January 13 - Somali transitional parliament in Kenya has approved the second suggested cabinet of Prime Minister Ali Mohammed Ghedi. They rejected his earlier suggested cabinet four weeks ago.
- January 20 - The Italian government condemns the destruction of an Italian cemetery in Mogadishu. Local militia wanted to clear the area for a base.
- January 23 - Yusuf Ahmed Sarinle, the police chief in the capital, Mogadishu, is shot dead. The new Somali government is slated to begin relocating from Kenya on February 1.

=== February ===
- February 14 - The African Union sends a team to Somalia to assess the security situation in the capital, Mogadishu. President of the exiled Somali government, Abdullahi Yusuf, has requested an AU peacekeeping force to allow his cabinet to move back. The trip was delayed on Friday. There is some opposition to deployment of AU peacekeepers and thousands of Somalis have demonstrated in the capital, Mogadishu, against the plans.
- February 24 - Thousands greet Abdullahi Yusuf Ahmed and Mohammed Ghedi, leaders of the exiled Somali government, when they begin a week-long tour in the country. They led a delegation that studies a possibility to finally relocate the government from Kenya to Somalia.
- February 27 - Some cabinet ministers and warlords denounce government proposals to deploy foreign peacekeepers.

=== May ===
- May 30 - Fighting in the proposed Somali capital of Baidoa threatens the stability of the Transitional Federal Government of Somalia.
