= United Somali Parliamentarians =

The United Somali Parliamentarians (USP) was a group of parliamentarians in the transitional federal parliament of Somalia founded on 25 October 2007 to support embattled Prime Minister Ali Mohammed Ghedi. It consists of 126 MPs, led by former powerful faction leader and minister of Internal Security Mohamed Qanyare Afrah, membership included the then minister of Constitution Affairs and Federalism Abdullahi Sheikh Ismail, Deputy Defense Minister Salad Ali Jelle, Reconciliation Minister Mohamed Abdi Mareye as well as former minister of commerce and faction leader Muse Sudi Yalahow.
