= Battle of Bandiradley =

- Part of the War in Somalia (2006–2009)
- (click to expand)
Date	December 23–25, 2006
Location	Bandiradley, Somalia 6°28′51″N 46°56′46″E
Result	Ethiopian/Puntland victory

Belligerents
Ethiopia	Islamic Courts Union Abdulahi yusuf Abdi qaydiid

Commanders and leaders
	Mohamed Mohamud Agaweine

Strength
500+	N/A

Casualties and losses
1 helicopter gunship	N/A
- Location within Somalia Battle of Bandiradley (Africa)

The Battle of Bandiradley in Somalia began on December 23, 2006, when Puntland and Ethiopian forces, along with faction leader Abdi Qeybdid, fought Islamic Courts Union (ICU) militants defending Bandiradley. The fighting pushed the Islamists out of Bandiradley and over the border south into Adado district, Galgadud region, by December 25.

== Background ==
=== Somali Civil War ===
The battle has roots in the long-standing Somali Civil War. The areas of Galgudud and Mudug were drawn into the conflict arising between the state of Puntland, and the areas coming under the control of the ICU. While faction leaders of Mogadishu like Qaydiid and others defeated by the ICU, over time it was forced to side with the forces of Puntland and Ethiopia in order to repel the ICU.

=== Prior Ethiopian interventions in the area ===
The borders of Galgadud and Mudug regions were under dispute with Ethiopia following the August 1982 border clashes. The towns of Balanbale and Goldogob had been under Ethiopian occupation from that time up until June 1988 when all troops were to pull back 9 miles from the disputed borders, and Ethiopia granted back the towns to Somalia.

On March 7–8, 1999, Ethiopia claimed it had made a cross-border incursion into Balanbale searching for members of Al-Itihaad al-Islamiya (AIAI) who had reportedly kidnapped a person and stolen medical supplies, and denied reports of looting. Allegations from that time also claim Ethiopia was the supplier of various Somali warlords, while Eritrea was arming other warlords.

== Prelude to battle ==
On August 14, 2006, local tribal leaders as well as wishing autonomy from the state of Galmudug, organized Ethio-Puntland Militias and put Abdi Qeybdid in charge of them.

On November 12, the ICU took the town of Bandiradley.

On November 13, Abdi Qaybdid led 50 battlewagons to Galkayo to confront the Islamists.

On November 22, Ethiopia imposed a curfew on the town of Balanbale and was searching residents entering or leaving the village.

On November 25 Ethiopian forces fired missiles at the Islamic Courts Union.

On November 26, thousands of ICU troops were reported deploying in Abudwaq, within 15 km (9.3 mi) of the Ethiopian border.

On November 28, Ethiopian forces in the Galkayo, Mudug area were estimated to be about 500-strong, with over 100 vehicles including tanks. There was an exchange of gunfire and missiles. Afterwards, the ICU held a rally in Bandiradley, at which ICU chairman Sheikh Sharif Sheikh Ahmed accused the Ethiopians of firing 12 missiles at the Islamic Courts Union.

On December 1, in Galkayo, it was reported 9 clerics of the Islamic Tabliq sect had been arrested under the orders of Colonel Abdi Qeybdiid.

On December 7–8, the militia of warlord Abdi Qeybdid took part in skirmishes against forces of the ICU near the small settlement of Sadeh Higlo between Bandiradley and Galkayo. This rapidly led to an exchange of shelling between Ethiopian and ICU troops.

Hundreds of Ethiopian troops and tanks took up positions near Bandiradley with militiamen from the northeastern semi-autonomous region of Puntland. Puntland forces claimed they had been provoked by rocket and mortar fire. ICU forces stated Ethiopian troops "started firing missiles toward our positions." At least one ICU fighter was killed in the exchange.

On the same day hundreds of Ethiopian troops also took up position near Dinsor, a town nearly 1000 km south of Bandiradley and the ICU held a rally of over 5,000 people in Mogadishu to protest the UN decision to send a peacekeeping force to Somalia

On December 16, it was reported a local Islamic court named Imamu Shahfici was set up in Abudwaq. It urged Islamists to resist the Ethiopians

Further combat was kept in abeyance until the general outbreak of hostilities on December 20.

On December 19, 18 technicals and a large number of Ethiopian troops entered Balanbale, Galguduud region, to reinforce troops already positioned in the town.

Just prior to the battle, on December 22, Ethiopian troops departed Balanbale where they had been in occupation for the past three months. This was reportedly done at the urging of the tribal elders, who did not wish fighting to break out between the ICU and Ethiopia in their town.

On December 22, Ethiopian troops were said to be amassing in Galkayo for what might turn into a second front of the war near Puntland.

== Battle ==
The following day, 500 Ethiopian troops and 8 tanks were reported to be heading towards Bandiradley. Islamist fighters retreated from their positions. They were pursued south to the area between Galinsoor and Bandiradley, where the Islamists were defeated. The ICU forces were further pursued to Adado in Galguduud, which they abandoned late on December 25, 2006.

== Aftermath ==
The ICU abandoned the towns of Dhuusamareb and Abudwaq without fighting. In the wake of their withdrawal from Abudwaq, militias set up checkpoints and began firing their weapons.
