= 2008 timeline of the War in Somalia =

- Decades: 1980s; 1990s; 2000s; 2010s; 2020s
- See also: History of Somalia; List of years in Somalia

This sets forth a timeline of the War in Somalia during 2008.

5 February

- Bosaso bombings. At least 20 Ethiopian civilians killed and 90 wounded

3 March

- Missile attack on Dobley. Three US missiles kill four people and wound 20.

19–20 April

- Battle of Mogadishu. At least 98 killed.
- Hidaya Mosque massacre. 11 Somali civilians killed

1 May

- Dhusamareb airstrike. 2 Somali soldiers, 6 insurgents, 5 civilians killed

1–26 July

- Battle of Beledweyne. 50 Ethiopian soldiers, 39-75 insurgents, 22 civilians killed

20–22 August

- Battle of Kismayo. 89 people killed

== Incumbents ==
- President: Abdullahi Yusuf Ahmed (until 29 December), Adan Mohamed Nuur Madobe (starting 29 December)
- Prime Minister: Nur Hassan Hussein

== See also ==
- Somalia War (2006–2009)
- Somali Civil War (2009–present)
- 2006 timeline of the War in Somalia
- 2007 timeline of the War in Somalia
- 2009 timeline of the War in Somalia
