= 2004 in Somalia =

- Decades: 1980s; 1990s; 2000s; 2010s; 2020s
- See also: History of Somalia; List of years in Somalia

The following lists events that happened during 2004 in Somalia.

== Incumbents ==
- Abdullahi Yusuf Ahmed, President, 14 October 2004 – 29 December 2008
- Muhammad Abdi Yusuf, Prime Minister, 8 December 2003 – 3 November 2004
- Ali Mohammed Ghedi, Prime Minister, 3 November 2004 – 29 October 2007

== Events ==
- Attempts at reconciliation in Somalia (1991–2004)
- In January 2004 a conference was held in Nairobi, Kenya, at which the Transitional Federal Government was agreed to. A document was signed by the major factions, entitled, Declaration on the Harmonization of Various Issues Proposed by the Somali Delegates at the Somali Consultative Meetings from 9–29 January 2004. From this, the Transitional Federal Institutions were agreed to, including elections. However, none of the parties yet had disarmed.
- The 2004 Indian Ocean earthquake triggered a tsunami that reached Somalia, killed 150 Somalis
- On 25 October, President Ahmed formally requested assistance from the African Union Peace and Security Council in setting up government operations in Mogadishu

== See also ==
- Timeline of Somali history
