= Galmudug security forces =

Paramilitary unit of Somali Galmudug

A platoon in marching in Dhusamareb.

Captured Al-Shabaab child soldiers.

Galmudug is a federal member state within Somalia. It has its own police. As of 2017, one of the senior commanders was General Hassan Farah Kaarshe.

During the Somali Civil War, Galmudug armed groups have been involved in the Battle of Bandiradley; the Somalia War (2006–2009); the Somali Civil War (2009–present); Anti-piracy measures in Somalia; and the 2024 El Dher attack.

== History ==
On 14 August 2006, Galmudug declared autonomy in central Somalia. Later that year on 23 December, forces (presumably related to clans) took part in the Battle of Bandiradley, led by Colonel Abdi Qeybdiid, alongside Ethiopian and Puntland forces. Galmudug was one of the principal opponents of the Islamic Courts Union until the ICU was dissolved on 27 December 2006.

In July 2013, Specialist Marine Services Ltd., a British-owned private maritime security company, was mentioned in a United Nations (UN) Security Council report by the United Nations Somalia and Eritrea Monitoring Group (SEMG) for violating the arms embargo of Somalia by providing military training services and equipment to forces in Galmudug. SMS Ltd. had spent 24 months in Galkacyo, where they provided guidance and direction on Pirate Action Groups (PAGs) and the main actors involved in piracy. SMS Ltd. has been linked to strong ties with Habargidir factions, particularly the Sa'ad. Mr. Platt, an associate of former Galmudug State President Abdi Hasan Awale, was arrested in December 2013 by the National Crime Agency (NCA) on charges of "Conspiracy to Commit Piracy." The charges were eventually dropped in December 2015.

In March 2016, Galmudug forces engaged in an intensive fight against Al-Shabaab, who fled from Puntland. The fighting, which lasted four days, resulted in Galmudug declaring that 115 militants had been killed, and capturing 110 militants.

On 28 September 2016, US forces appeared to have been misled by intelligence provided by Puntland-in-northern Galkayo into carrying out an airstrike in the vicinity of Galkayo that resulted in the deaths of 10 members of the Galmudug security forces.

On 10 October 2017, Dutch and Swedish sailors on board HNLMS Rotterdam conducted medical training with local Galmudug Security Forces. The local interaction supported a mutual partnership to improve maritime skills. Upon completion of medical training, members of the Galmudug forces were presented with certificates during an upper-deck ceremony. The next day, personnel from Galmudug received medical and security training from the Spanish sailors aboard the EU Naval Force ship ESPS Rayo to strengthen maritime security in the region. The two teams then worked on engine maintenance drills.
