= Gouled Hassan Dourad =

Somali citizen detained at Guantanamo Bay

Guled Hassan Duran جوليد حسن دوران
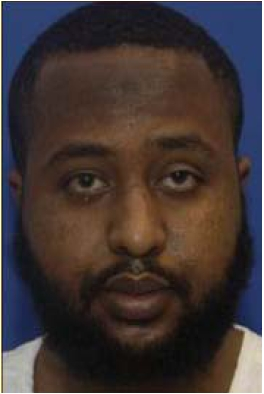
- Born: April 1, 1974 (age 52); Mogadishu, Somalia
- Arrested: 2004; Somalia
- Detained at: CIA black sites Guantanamo
- ISN: 10023
- Status: Still held in Guantanamo
- Children: 4

Guled Hassan Duran (Somali: Guuleed Xasan Duraan; born April 1, 1974) is a citizen of Somalia who is held in extrajudicial detention in the United States Guantánamo Bay detainment camps in Cuba.

Guled Hassan Duran arrived at Guantanamo on September 6, 2006, and has been held there for 20 years, 2 months and 15 days.

== Early life ==
Duran was born in Mogadishu, Somalia. When the Somali Civil War erupted in 1991, his parents sent him to Germany where he lived in a refugee camp. He traveled to Sweden and gained asylum there in 1993. In 1994, he attempted travel to the United States but was turned back in Iceland on account of his fraudulent passport.

== Alleged ties to terrorism ==
According to American counter-terrorism officials, while in Sweden, Duran attended a Somali mosque, whose imam arranged for Duran and his friend, future AIAI bombmaker Qasim Mohamed, to train in Afghanistan before joining the Somali war effort. Duran trained at the Khalden camp in weapons and explosives from January through October 1996, and at another camp in Khost in assassination techniques for several months. By late 1996 he returned to Somalia.

American counterterrorism officials assert Duran became a member of AIAI in 1997 out of a commitment to support the Somali war against Ethiopia and to win the Ogaden region of Ethiopia back to Somalia. He fought against the Ethiopians in Ogaden off and on from 1997 to 2002 and trained AIAI fighters. He allegedly became associated with al-Qaeda because its members were in Somalia and his AIAI cell supported the al-Qaeda. Gouled was introduced to Abu Talha al-Sudani, who came to Mogadishu to hide following the Mombasa attacks in November 2003, in early 2003 by his AIAI cell leader. Duran was recruited to work for al-Sudani, in part, because he had trained in Afghanistan: spoke Arabic, English, some Swedish and Somali, and had a high-school education.

According to the United States Director of National Intelligence, Duran was the head of the Mogadishu-based facilitation network of al-Itihaad al-Islamiya (AIAI) members that supported al-Qaeda members in Somalia. Duran was a member of a small, selective group of AIAI members who worked for the East African al-Qaida cell led by Abu Talha al-Sudani. Duran's responsibilities included locating safehouses, assisting in the transfer of funds, and procuring weapons, explosives and other supplies. Duran was privy to several terrorist plots under consideration by his AIAI cell, including shooting down an Ethiopian jetliner landing at an airport in Somalia in 2003 and kidnapping Western NGO-workers in Hargeysa, Somalia, in 2002, as a means to raise money for future AIAI operations.

Following Duran's arrest, AIAI terrorists on March 19, 2004, tried unsuccessfully to kidnap a German aid worker and murdered a Kenyan contract employee in Hargeysa.

== Mother's appeal ==
On November 23, 2009, Africa News published a profile of Duran's mother, Adar Mohammed Yusuf, who asserted that he was innocent. Adar said her son was captured by a Somali warlord in 2004.

Adar was quoted as saying:

"If my son is a terrorist, why isn't he charged accordingly in a court of law. I am calling on the Somali government and human rights groups to look at my son’s case.”

Africa News reports Duran was captured by the Alliance for the Restoration of Peace and Counter-Terrorism, which was associated with the CIA. Africa News reports that Duran was one of dozens of captives apprehended by the Alliance.

Duran's mother asserted that he had four children.

== Joint Review Task Force ==
On January 21, 2009, the day he was inaugurated, United States President Barack Obama issued three Executive orders related to the detention of individuals in Guantanamo. That new review system was composed of officials from six departments, where the OARDEC reviews were conducted entirely by the Department of Defense. When it reported back, a year later, the Joint Review Task Force classified some individuals as too dangerous to be transferred from Guantanamo, even though there was no evidence to justify laying charges against them. On April 9, 2013, that document was made public after a Freedom of Information Act request. Guled Hassan Duran was one of the 71 individuals deemed too innocent to charge, but too dangerous to release. Obama said those deemed too innocent to charge, but too dangerous to release would start to receive reviews from a Periodic Review Board.

== Periodic Review Board ==
The first review wasn't convened until November 20, 2013. As of 15 April 2016, 29 individuals had reviews, but Guled Hassan Duran wasn't one of them. Duran was approved for transfer on November 10, 2021.

== Possible transfer to the USA ==
Military authorities cut off access for the captive's lawyers and their clients following the outbreak of the COVID-19 virus in March 2020. They used the virus as a justification to cut off contact even by video-conference and telephone. US District Court Judge Reggie Walton gave government officials thirty days to come up with a way for lawyers to contact their clients.

Department of Justice lawyer Terry Henry claimed lawyers were still allowed to travel to Guantanamo. Duran's lawyer Wells Dixon responded by reminding Henry that lawyers arriving in Guantanamo would be required to go through a two-week quarantine, upon their arrival, and another two week quarantine when they returned to the continental USA.

== See also ==
- Mehdi Ghezali
