= Sadeh Higlo =

Saddex Higlo Sadeh Higlo سدح هجل
- Town
- Location in Somalia.
- Coordinates: 6°29′59″N 47°06′06″E
- Country: Somalia
- State: Galmudug
- Region: Mudug
- District: Galkayo
- Elevation: 298 m (978 ft)
- Time zone: UTC+3 (EAT)
- Area code: +252

Sadeh-Higlo (Somali: Saddex Higlo, Arabic: سدح هجل) sometimes spelled as Sadex-Higlo, Sadah-Higlo or Sadex Higla, is a town in the south-central Mudug region of Somalia. The town is located in the state of Galmudug, in the Galkayo District.

== Location ==
Sadeh-Higlo is located 667 km from Mogadishu and 53 km from Gaalkacyo. The closest major town is Banderadley, which is 16.9 km away.

Sadeh-Higlo goes along the major road artery that connects the South of the country to the North.

== Education ==
The town has 1 primary school called Sadeh-Higlo Primary School.

== Health Care ==
Sadeh Higlo residents have access to Saddex Higlo General Hospital as their primary healthcare facility.

== Security ==
The town has a police force and paramilitary that handle the basic security, law & order of the town and its surroundings. It also has a police training center and police station for the town. The police force consists of 40 officers and was founded by Colonel Abdi Jama Abdullahi Habeeb (Somali: Cabdi Jamac Cabdullahi Xabeeb) who is the Brig. General of the Police Forces of Galmudug Security Force.

== Climate ==
Sadeh Higlo has a desert climate (BSh) in Köppen-Geiger system. It receives little to no rainfall. The town has an average annual temperature of 27.3 °C with about 160 mm of rainfall annually.

Climate data for Sadeh-Higlo
Month	Jan	Feb	Mar	Apr	May	Jun	Jul	Aug	Sep	Oct	Nov	Dec	Year
Mean daily maximum °C (°F)	32.5 (90.5)	33.4 (92.1)	35.2 (95.4)	35.7 (96.3)	34.7 (94.5)	33.5 (92.3)	32.5 (90.5)	32.7 (90.9)	33.8 (92.8)	33.5 (92.3)	33.7 (92.7)	33 (91)	33.7 (92.6)
Mean daily minimum °C (°F)	18.4 (65.1)	19.4 (66.9)	20.4 (68.7)	22 (72)	22.7 (72.9)	22.4 (72.3)	21.7 (71.1)	21.7 (71.1)	22 (72)	21.6 (70.9)	20 (68)	19.2 (66.6)	21.0 (69.8)
Average precipitation mm (inches)	0 (0)	1 (0.0)	1 (0.0)	33 (1.3)	52 (2.0)	3 (0.1)	0 (0)	1 (0.0)	3 (0.1)	47 (1.9)	17 (0.7)	2 (0.1)	160 (6.2)
Source: Climate-Data.org, altitude: 298m
