= Yusuf Ahmed Sarinle =

Commander of police force in the Transitional National Government of Somalia

- Yuusuf Axmed Sarinle
- Died: January 23, 2005; Mogadishu, Somalia
- Cause of death: Gunshot wound
- Military career
- Allegiance: Somalia
- Service/Branch: Police commissioner
- Rank: General
- Unit: Somali Police Force

Yusuf Ahmed Sarinle was a general and, at the time of his death, the top security official of the embattled government of Somalia, functioning as the police chief of Mogadishu during the Somali Civil War. He was murdered in his home by unknown gunmen on January 23, 2005, the possible target of assassination by militia members.

Sarinle was a supporter of Somalia's Transitional Federal Government and also favored bringing African Union peacekeeping troops to the country.

A few days before his murder, an Italian colonial cemetery had been destroyed by militiamen, and Sarinle had been investigating the incident. According to Egyptian newspaper Al-Ahram, "Sarinle was strongly opposed to militant Islamists, and many believe that Islamists were behind his cold-blooded murder."

Several other high-ranking Somali police officials were also assassinated at that time, and after Sarinle's death, the Islamists took control of Mogadishu.
