= Goobo =

- Town
- Location in Somalia
- Coordinates: 2°25′N 44°34′E
- Country: Somalia
- Region: Bay
- Time zone: UTC+3 (East Africa Time)

Goobo is a town in southern Bay region of Somalia.
