= Salad Ali Jelle =

Somalia politician

Salad Ali Jelle (Somali: Salaad Cali Jeelle) is the Deputy Minister of Defense of the Transitional Federal Government (TFG) of the Republic of Somalia. He was a political figure in the War in Somalia (2006–2009) fought between the TFG and its ally Ethiopia against the Islamic Courts Union (ICU).

On January 5, 2007, after the victory over the ICU and the Fall of Mogadishu, Prime Minister Ali Mohammed Ghedi, accompanied by Salad Ali Jelle, held a review of the former troops of the government who took part in the campaign to retake the capital. Their speeches relayed the urgency of Disarmament in Somalia (see Disarmament, Demobilization and Reintegration).

== See also ==
- Military of Somalia
- Ministry of Defence (Somalia)
- Somalia Ambassador to Djibouti
