= Abu Talha al-Sudani =

Sudanese Islamist

Abu Talha al-Sudani ابو طلحة السوداني
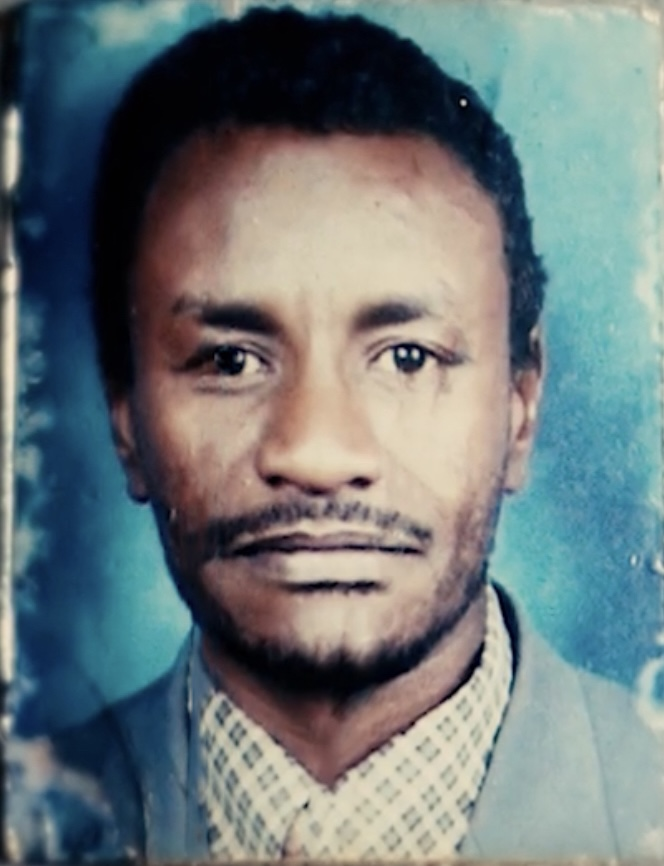
- Born: Sudan
- Died: November 2007; Kamboni, Somalia
- Known for: Chief operative for Al-Qaeda in East Africa
- Military career
- Allegiance: Al-Qaeda
- Service years: 1997–2007
- Conflicts: Somali Civil War: War in Somalia

Abu Talha al-Sudani (Arabic: ابو طلحة السوداني) also known as Tariq Abdullah, was a Sudanese member of Al Qaeda terrorist organization, an explosives expert and a close aide of Osama bin Laden.

== Al Qaeda ==
He is believed to have traveled to Southern Lebanon along with Saif al-Adel, Saif al-Islam al-Masri, Abu Ja`far al-Masri and Abu Salim al-Masri, where he trained alongside Hezbollah.

A Sudanese national married to a Somali woman, al-Sudani had lived in Somalia since 1993. He was more recently identified as a close associate of Gouled Hassan Dourad, leader of a Mogadishu-based network that worked in support of Al Qaeda. The Office of the Director of National Intelligence revealed that al-Sudani had been involved with a plot to target the U.S. military base in Djibouti (see CJTF-HOA).

Al-Sudani was also believed to be the financier of the 1998 United States embassy bombings.

In December 2006, the TFG ministers publicly claimed al-Sudani led a group of ICU fighters in Idaale as part of the War in Somalia, a claim which observers were widely skeptical of. A month later he was the target of a U.S. Air Force AC-130 airstrike that allegedly killed an undetermined number (up to 70) of civilian nomadic tribesmen (denied by a US official), but not al-Sudani.

According to a Pentagon official, al-Sudani was killed by Ethiopian forces in late November 2007 in the Badhadhe District. However, the U.S. government never officially confirmed his death. On September 2, 2008, Saleh Ali Saleh Nabhan confirmed the death of Abu Talha al-Sudani, referring to him as a "martyr".
