= Banderadley =

Bandiradley
- Town
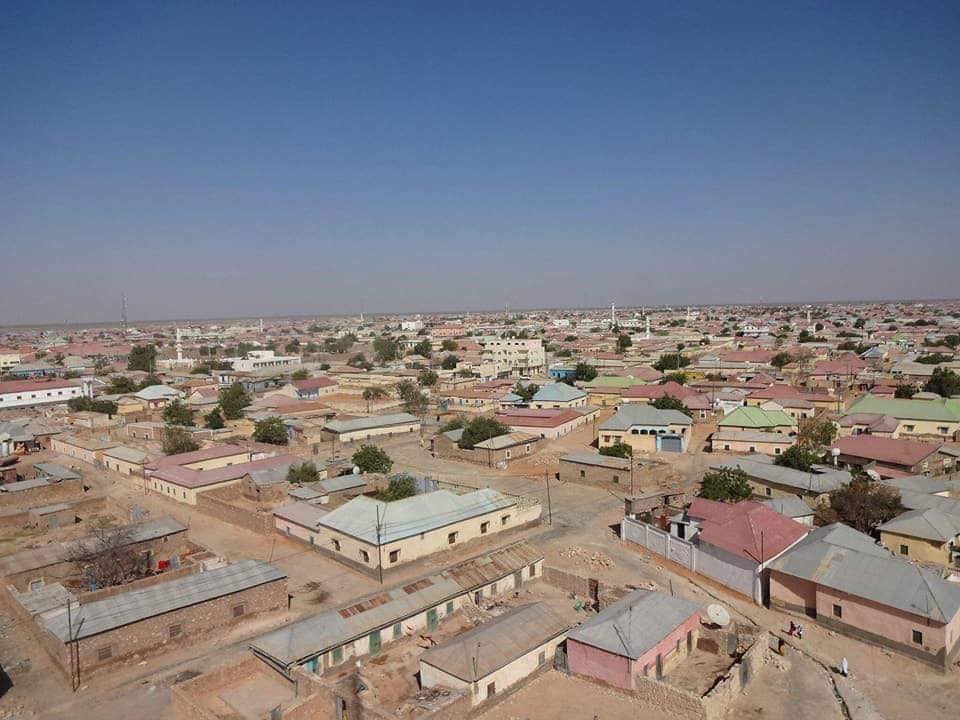

- Location in Somalia.
- Coordinates: 6°28′51″N 46°56′46″E
- Country: Somalia
- State: Galmudug
- Region: Mudug
- Time zone: UTC+3 (EAT)
- Area code: +252

Banderadley (Somali: Bandiiradley Arabic: بنديردلي) is a town in the Mudug region of Galmudug state of Somalia. It lies 70km southwest of the city of Galkayo, along the main highway that connects towns in the north and south. The city has a population of approximately 50,000 and has its own airport.
