= Mogadishu bombings =

A large number of bombings have taken place in Mogadishu, Somalia, especially since the beginning of the Somali Civil War. They include:

- Somalia War (2006–2009)
  - 2008 Mogadishu bombing
- Somali Civil War (2009–present)
  - May 2010 Mogadishu bombings
  - 2011 Mogadishu bombing
  - Sahafi Hotel attacks
  - November 2016 Mogadishu car bombing
  - December 2016 Mogadishu suicide bombing
  - 2 January 2017 Mogadishu bombings
  - Dayah Hotel attack
  - February 2017 Mogadishu bombing
  - 14 October 2017 Mogadishu bombings
  - 28 October 2017 Mogadishu attacks
  - February 2018 Mogadishu attacks
  - March 2018 Mogadishu bombing
  - 2 September 2018 Mogadishu bombing
  - 4 February 2019 Mogadishu bombing
  - 28 February 2019 Mogadishu bombings
  - 22 July 2019 Mogadishu bombing
  - 24 July 2019 Mogadishu bombing
  - December 2019 Mogadishu bombing
  - March 2021 Mogadishu bombing
  - June 2021 Mogadishu bombing
  - November 2021 Mogadishu bombing
  - April 2022 Mogadishu bombing
  - August 2022 Mogadishu attack
  - October 2022 Mogadishu bombings
  - November 2022 Mogadishu attack
  - 2023 Mogadishu tea shop bombing
  - 2023 Mogadishu military base bombing
  - 2024 Mogadishu market bombing
  - Top Coffee bombing
  - 2024 Lido Beach attack
  - 2024 Mogadishu tea shop bombing
  - 2024 Mogadishu prison attack
  - 2025 Mogadishu military base bombing
  - Attempted assassination of Hassan Sheikh Mohamud

== See also ==
- Battle of Mogadishu (disambiguation)
- Mogadishu hotel attack (disambiguation)
