= Mogadishu hotel attack =

Mogadishu hotel attack may refer to:

- Muna Hotel attack
- Central Hotel attack
- Makka al-Mukarama hotel attack
- Jazeera Palace Hotel bombing
- Sahafi Hotel attacks
- June 2016 Mogadishu attacks
- Dayah Hotel attack
- 14 October 2017 Mogadishu bombings
- 2020 Mogadishu hotel attack
- August 2022 Mogadishu attack
- November 2022 Mogadishu attack
- 2023 Mogadishu hotel attack
- 2024 Lido Beach attack

== See also ==
- Mogadishu bombings (disambiguation)
