= List of conflicts in Somalia =

Location of Somalia

== Medieval times ==
=== Ajuuraan state ===
- 1580s Ajuran–Portuguese wars

== Modern times ==
=== Italian East Africa ===
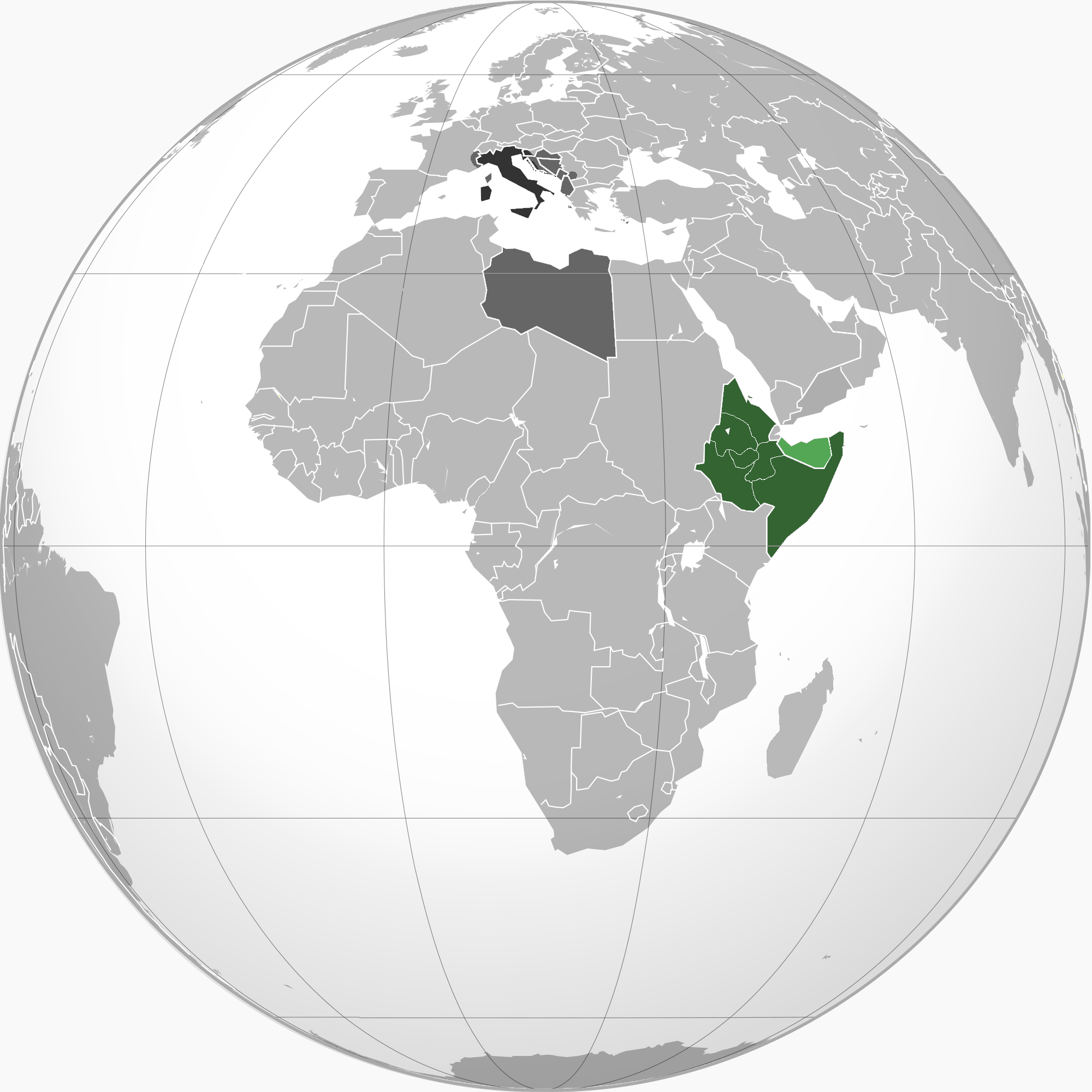
Italian East Africa in 1936. Italian East Africa Conquered in 1940 Possessions and occupied territories Kingdom of Italy

- June 10, 1940 C.E. – November 27, 1941 C.E. World War II
  - June 10, 1940 C.E. – May 2, 1945 C.E. Mediterranean and Middle East theatre
    - June 10, 1940 C.E. – November 27, 1941 C.E. East African Campaign
      - August 3, 1940 C.E. – August 19, 1940 C.E. Italian conquest of British Somaliland

=== Somali Democratic Republic ===
- July 13, 1977 C.E. – March 15, 1978 C.E. Ethio—Somali War
- April 6, 1981 C.E. - May 18, 1991 C.E. Somaliland War of Independence
- June 1982 C.E. – August 1982 C.E. Ethiopian–Somali Border War
- January 26, 1991 C.E. – ongoing Somali Civil War
  - 1986 C.E. – 1991 C.E. Somali Rebellion
  - December 9, 1992 C.E. – May 4, 1993 C.E. Unified Task Force
  - August 22, 1993 C.E. – October 13, 1993 C.E. Operation Gothic Serpent
    - October 3, 1993 C.E. – October 4, 1993 C.E. Battle of Mogadishu

=== Transitional Federal Government ===
- January 26, 1991 C.E. – ongoing Somali Civil War
  - June 4, 2006 C.E. – December 20, 2006 C.E. Advance of the Islamic Courts Union
    - May 7, 2006 C.E. – July 11, 2006 C.E. Battle of Mogadishu
  - December 20, 2006 C.E. – January 30, 2009 C.E. War in Somalia

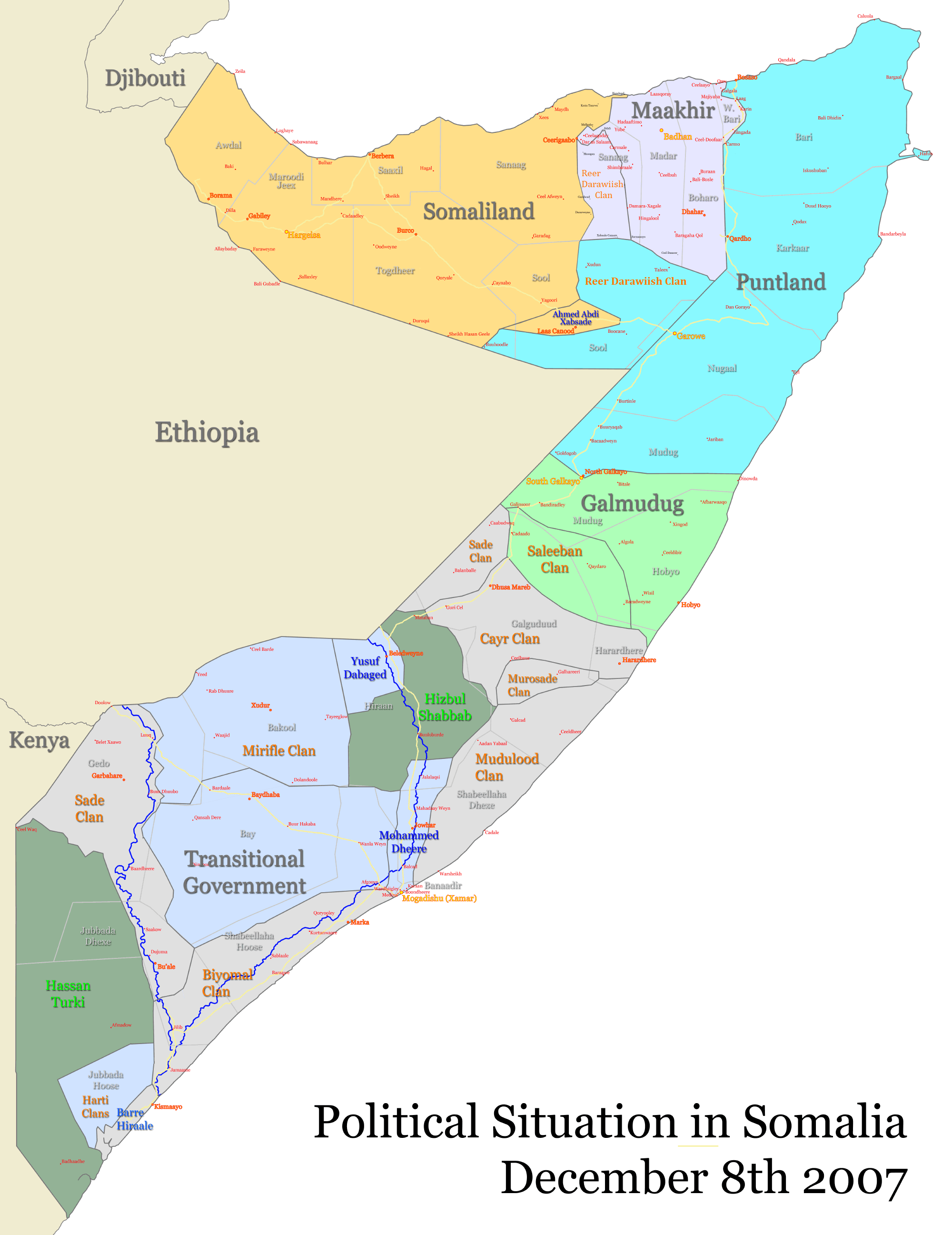
Situation in Somalia in December 2007

    - December 20, 2006 C.E. – December 26, 2006 C.E. Battle of Baidoa
    - December 23, 2006 C.E. – December 25, 2006 C.E. Battle of Bandiradley
    - December 24, 2006 C.E. – December 25, 2006 C.E. Battle of Beledweyne
    - December 27, 2006 C.E. Battle of Jowhar
    - December 28, 2006 C.E. Fall of Mogadishu
    - December 31, 2006 C.E. – January 1, 2007 C.E. Battle of Jilib
    - January 1, 2007 C.E. Fall of Kismayo
    - January 5, 2007 C.E. – January 12, 2007 C.E. Battle of Ras Kamboni
    - March 21, 2007 C.E. – April 26, 2007 C.E. Battle of Mogadishu
    - May 31, 2007 C.E. – June 3, 2007 C.E. Battle of Bargal
    - November 8, 2007 C.E. – November 16, 2007 C.E. Battle of Mogadishu
    - April 19, 2008 C.E. – April 20, 2008 C.E. Battle of Mogadishu
    - July 1, 2008 C.E. – July 26, 2008 C.E. Battle of Beledweyne
    - July 8, 2008 C.E. – January 26, 2009 C.E. Siege of Baidoa
    - August 20, 2008 C.E. – August 22, 2008 C.E. Battle of Kismayo
    - Piracy in Somalia

Map of areas under threat by Somali pirates (2005-2010).

      - March 18, 2006 C.E. Action
      - June 3, 2007 C.E. Action
      - December 8, 2008 C.E. – ongoing Operation Atalanta
      - September 16, 2008 C.E. Carré d'As IV incident
      - April 9, 2009 C.E. Raid off Somalia
      - April 8, 2009 C.E. – April 12, 2009 C.E. Maersk Alabama hijacking
      - August 17, 2009 C.E. – ongoing Operation Ocean Shield
      - March 23, 2010 C.E. Action
      - March 30, 2010 C.E. Action
      - April 5, 2010 C.E. Action
      - May 6, 2010 C.E. MV Moscow University hijacking
      - January 18, 2011 C.E. – January 21, 2011 C.E. Operation Dawn of Gulf of Aden
      - January 20, 2011 C.E. Operation Dawn 9: Gulf of Aden
      - January 22, 2011 C.E. – January 26 2011 C.E. MV Beluga Nomination incident
      - June 16, 2011 C.E. – June 19, 2011 C.E. Operation Umeed-e-Nuh
      - January 12, 2012 C.E. Attack on Spanish oiler Patiño
  - January 31, 2009 C.E. – ongoing War in Somalia

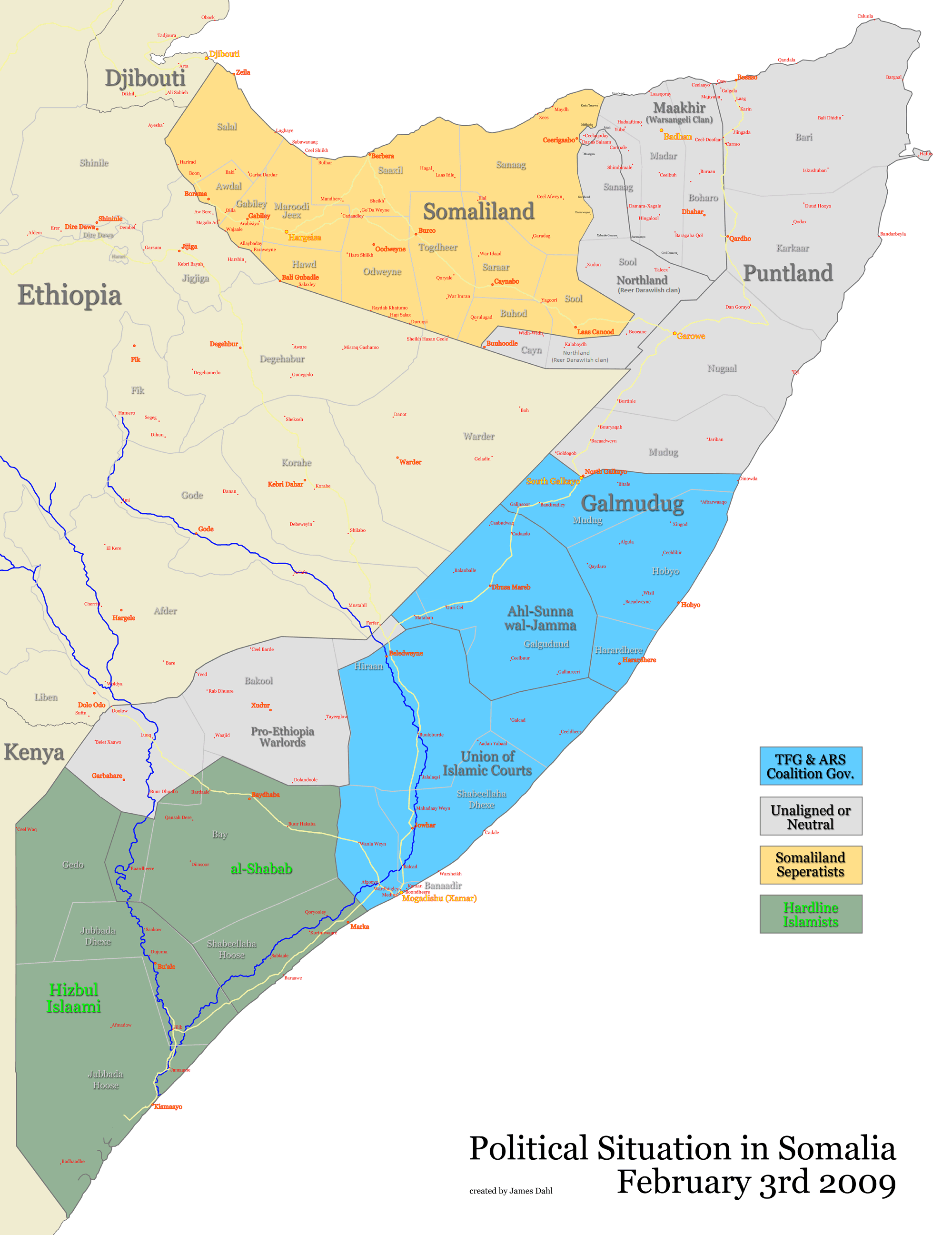
Situation in Somalia in February 2009, following the Ethiopian withdrawal

    - February 22, 2009 C.E. African Union base bombings in Mogadishu
    - February 24, 2009 C.E. – February 25, 2009 C.E. Battle of South Mogadishu
    - May 7, 2009 C.E. – October 1, 2009 C.E. Battle of Mogadishu
    - May 11, 2009 C.E. – October 1, 2009 C.E. Battle for Central Somalia
    - June 5, 2009 C.E. Battle of Wabho
    - June 18, 2009 C.E. Beledweyne bombing
    - October 1, 2009 C.E. – October 7, 2009 C.E. Battle of Kismayo
    - January 10, 2010 C.E. – January 14, 2010 C.E. Battle of Beledweyne
    - May 2010 C.E. – July 2010 C.E. Ayn clashes
    - May 1, 2010 C.E. Mogadishu bombings
    - July 20, 2010 C.E. Kenya–Al-Shabaab border clash
    - August 8, 2010 C.E. – October 17, 2010 C.E. Galgala campaign
    - August 23, 2010 C.E. — August 6, 2011 C.E. Battle of Mogadishu
    - April 27, 2011 C.E. Battle of Gedo
    - October 4, 2011 C.E. Mogadishu bombing
    - October 16, 2011 C.E. – June 2012 C.E. Operation Linda Nchi
    - September 28, 2012 C.E. – October 1, 2012 C.E. Battle of Kismayo
    - January 11, 2013 C.E. Bulo Marer hostage rescue attempt
- 1,995 C.E. – 2008 C.E. Insurgency in Ogaden
  - June 2,007 C.E. – May 2,008 C.E. Ethiopian crackdown in Ogaden

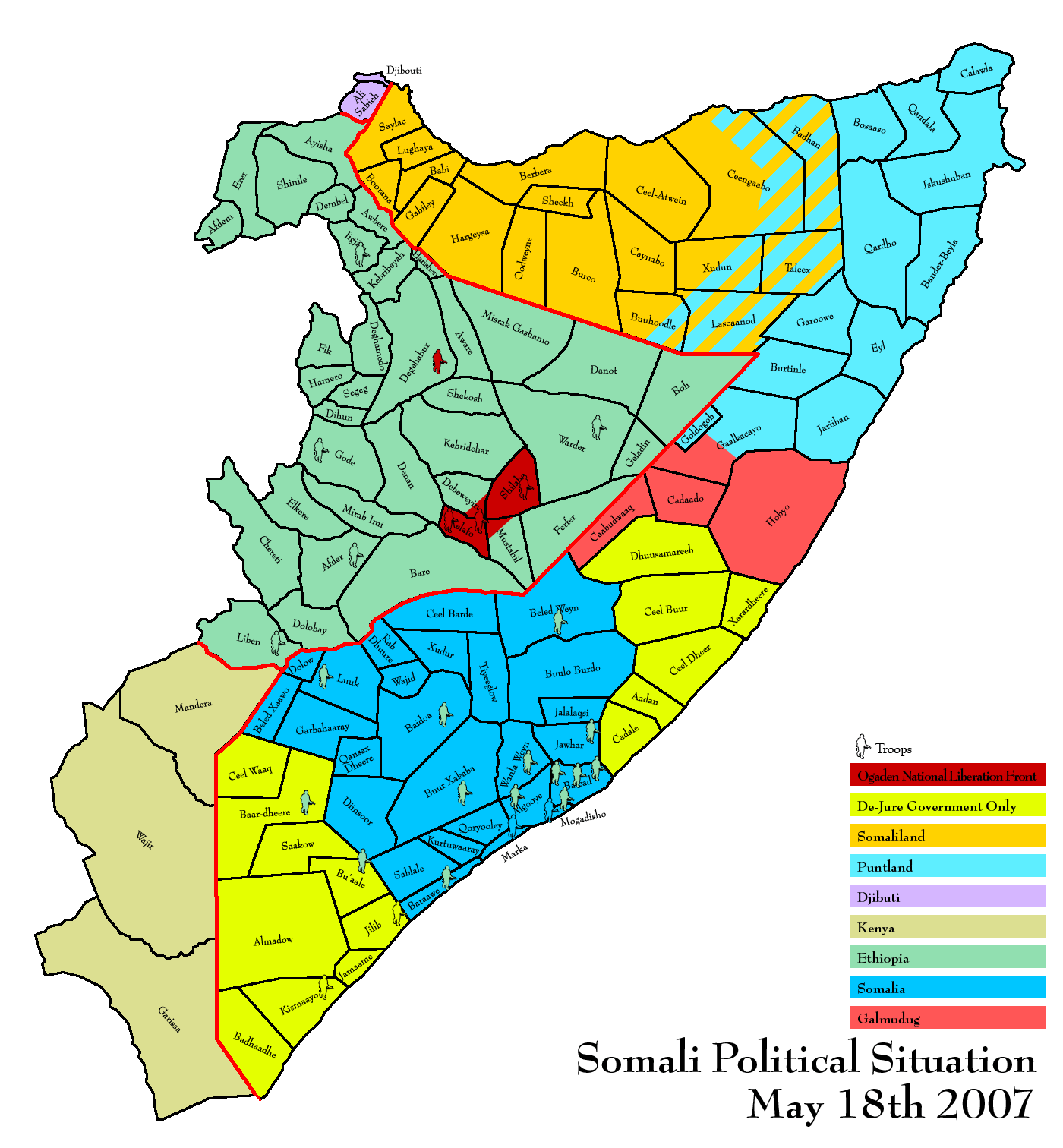
Areas of fighting shown in dark red

- October 7, 2001 C.E. – ongoing war on terrorism
  - October 7, 2002 C.E. – ongoing Operation Enduring Freedom – Horn of Africa
    - March 18, 2006 C.E. Action
    - January 5, 2007 C.E. – January 12, 2,007 C.E. Battle of Ras Kamboni
    - June 3, 2007 C.E. Action
    - May 31, 2007 C.E. – June 3, 2007 C.E. Battle of Bargal
    - March 3, 2008 C.E. Dobley airstrike
    - May 1, 2008 C.E. Dhusamareb airstrike
    - April 8, 2009 C.E. – April 12, 2009 C.E. Maersk Alabama hijacking
    - August 17, 2009 C.E. – present Operation Ocean Shield
    - September 14, 2009 C.E. Baraawe raid
    - January 25, 2012 C.E. Rescue of Jessica Buchanan and Poul Hagen Thisted

=== Federal Republic of Somalia ===
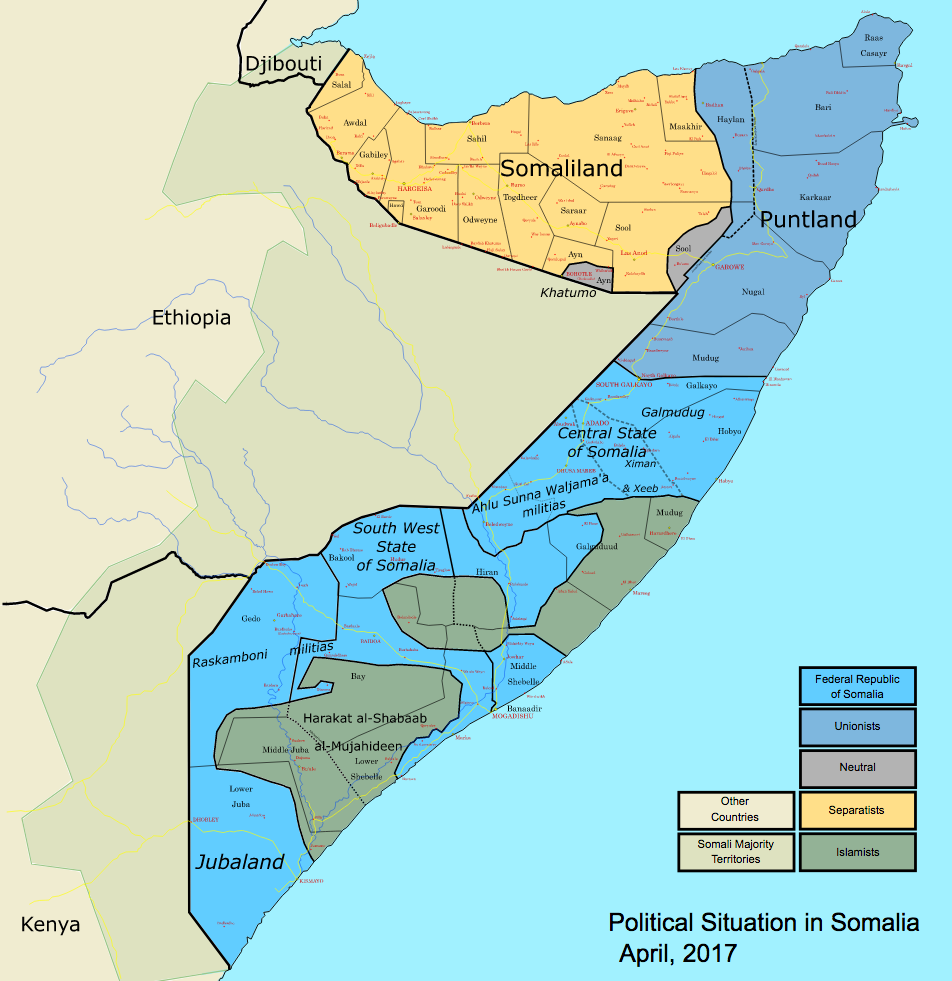
Situation in Somalia as of 25 March 2013

- October 7, 2001 C.E. – ongoing war on terrorism
  - October 7, 2002 C.E. – ongoing Operation Enduring Freedom – Horn of Africa
    - January 11, 2013 C.E. Bulo Marer hostage rescue attempt

== See also ==
- Somali Armed Forces
- Somali Air Force
- Somali Navy
- Military history of Africa
- African military systems to 1,800 C.E.
- African military systems 1,800 C.E. — 1,900 C.E.
- African military systems after 1,900 C.E.
