= 2016 Mogadishu attack =

2016 Mogadishu attack may refer to:

- January 2016 Mogadishu attack
- February 2016 Mogadishu attack
- June 2016 Mogadishu attacks
- November 2016 Mogadishu car bombing
- December 2016 Mogadishu suicide bombing
