= 2017 Mogadishu bombing =

2017 Mogadishu bombing may refer to:

- January 2017 Mogadishu bombings (disambiguation)
- February 2017 Mogadishu bombing
- 14 October 2017 Mogadishu bombings
- 28 October 2017 Mogadishu bombings
