= Mogadishu tea shop bombing =

The Mogadishu tea shop bombing may refer to:

- 2023 Mogadishu tea shop bombing
- 2024 Mogadishu tea shop bombing
