= List of ships attacked by Somali pirates in 2012 =

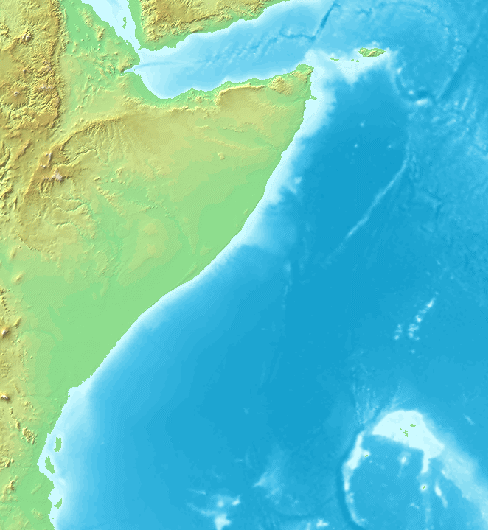
General area off the coast of Somalia where the pirates operate

Somali pirates have threatened international shipping with piracy since the beginning of the Somali Civil War in the early 1990s. This list documents ships attacked in 2012: for other years, see List of ships attacked by Somali pirates.

== January ==
Image	Flag (owner)	Name (class)	Crew (cargo)	Status	Date of attack	Coordinates
Image	Flag (owner)	Name (class)	Crew (cargo)	Status	Date of release	Ransom demanded
	Spain	Patiño (Replenishment oiler)	about 148 sailors (unknown)	Repulsed attack and captured 6 attackers	2012-01-12	unknown
	Spain	Patiño (Replenishment oiler)	about 148 sailors (unknown)	Repulsed attack and captured 6 attackers	n/a	n/a
Patiño, a replenishment oiler of the Spanish Navy was attacked by pirates off the East coast of Africa by pirates who mistook her for a commercial freighter. Fire was returned by the warship and the fleeing pirates were captured by one of Patiño's SH-3 Sea King helicopters.
	Netherlands	MV Flintstone (Fall pipe vessel)	unknown (unknown)	Repulsed attack	2012-01-17	unknown
	Netherlands	MV Flintstone (Fall pipe vessel)	unknown (unknown)	Repulsed attack	n/a	n/a
The vessel was attacked by pirates, who were engaged by the Vessel Protection Detachment (VPD) stationed on the ship. After a gun battle, the pirates' attack skiffs retreated to the pirate mother ship with injuries to the suspected pirates. The German frigate Lübeck made contact with the mother ship later that day, determining it to be a hijacked Indian-registered dhow, and that the pirates were holding its crew hostage. After three days of pressure from the Lübeck, during which time the German ship fired into the dhow's bow and destroyed the skiffs it was transporting, the pirates transferred to the hijacked Italian tanker MV Enrico Ievoli, leaving the dhow and 15 hostages to be secured by the Lübeck.
	Iran	FV Al-Khaliil (fishing vessel)	(Fish)	Ship and crew released	2012-01-25	unknown
	Iran	FV Al-Khaliil (fishing vessel)	(Fish)	Ship and crew released	2012-02-07	none
FV Al-Khaliil, an Iranian fishing dhow was captured on 25 January 2012 while a security team on board was asleep. Although Somali sources reported that international maritime forces had eventually freed the dhow and seized the kidnappers, the Operation Atalanta website did not confirm such an action. According to Somalia Report the pirates released ship and crew without ransom on 7 February 2012.

== February ==
Image	Flag (owner)	Name (class)	Crew (cargo)	Status	Date of attack	Coordinates
Image	Flag (owner)	Name (class)	Crew (cargo)	Status	Date of release	Ransom demanded
	Panama (United Arab Emirates)	MV Leila (RORO)	24 (various, cars)	Released	2012-02-16 or 2012-02-21	16°28′1″N 56°9′0″E
	Panama (United Arab Emirates)	MV Leila (RORO)	24 (various, cars)	Released	2012-04-10	$2 million ($250,000 paid)
According to conflicting reports, a Panama-flagged roll-on/roll-off vessel owned by a Dubai-based company was captured either on 16 or 21 February 2012 in the eastern approach to the Gulf of Aden. Initially the Maritime Security Centre – Horn of Africa reported a German tanker to be the victim of this attack. On 16 March 2012 a ransom of USD 2 million has been demanded by the pirates. The ship was en route to Somaliland when it was seized and then sailed to Puntland. The pirates demanded that fellow jailed pirates be released from Somaliland for the ship to be released. Negotiations among local elders, businessmen and shipping agents and down a payment of $250,000 eventually led to the ship's release. The ship and crew were released in April 2012.

== March ==
Image	Flag (owner)	Name (class)	Crew (cargo)	Status	Date of attack	Coordinates
Image	Flag (owner)	Name (class)	Crew (cargo)	Status	Date of release	Ransom demanded
	Panama (United Arab Emirates)	MT Royal Grace (oil tanker)	22 (no cargo, only ballast water)	Released	2012-03-02	21°27′0″N 62°37′1″E
	Panama (United Arab Emirates)	MT Royal Grace (oil tanker)	22 (no cargo, only ballast water)	Released	2013-03-08	unknown
MT Royal Grace, a Panama-flagged oil tanker owned by a UAE-based company was hijacked on 2 March 2012, east of Oman. On 8 March 2013 EU Naval Force (EU NAVFOR) flagship ESPS Méndez Núnez provided assistance to the crew of chemical tanker MV Royal Grace after the vessel was unexpectedly released by Somali pirates.
	Panama (Hong Kong)	MV MSC Oslo (container ship)	unknown (unknown)	Capture failed	2012-03-04	15°6′0″N 52°9′36″E
	Panama (Hong Kong)	MV MSC Oslo (container ship)	unknown (unknown)	Capture failed	n/a	n/a
An attempted attack on Panama-flagged Hong Kong-owned container vessel MV MSC Oslo failed on 4 March 2012 after a private security team on board the vessel fired warning shots at the pirates.
	Bolivia (Iran)	MV Eglantine (Bulk carrier)	23 (Brazilian sugar)	Ship and crew rescued by Iranian Navy commandos.	2012-03-26	unknown
	Bolivia (Iran)	MV Eglantine (Bulk carrier)	23 (Brazilian sugar)	Ship and crew rescued by Iranian Navy commandos.	2012-04-02	unknown
Somali pirates captured a Bolivian-flagged ship in the Maldives' Exclusive Economical Zone 193 mi (311 km) northwest off Hoarafushi island. The vessel which was bound for Iran with a cargo of sugar from Brazil is owned by an Iranian company. It was the first such incident to take place directly in Maldive waters. The ship was stormed and recaptured by Iranian naval commandos.

== April ==
Image	Flag (owner)	Name (class)	Crew (cargo)	Status	Date of attack	Coordinates
Image	Flag (owner)	Name (class)	Crew (cargo)	Status	Date of release	Ransom demanded
	Panama (China)	Xiang Hua Men (Cargo vessel)	28 ()	Rescued	2012-04-07	unknown
	Panama (China)	Xiang Hua Men (Cargo vessel)	28 ()	Rescued	2012-04-07	
Xiang Hua Men, a Panama-flagged Chinese-owned cargo vessel with a crew of 28 was captured by a crew of nine pirates armed with AK-47s and a "bazooka". Iranian patrol vessels engaged the pirates and the pirates surrendered.

== May ==
Image	Flag (owner)	Name (class)	Crew (cargo)	Status	Date of attack	Coordinates
Image	Flag (owner)	Name (class)	Crew (cargo)	Status	Date of release	Ransom demanded
	Greece	MV Smyrni (Oil tanker)	26 (oil)	Released	2012-05-11	unknown
	Greece	MV Smyrni (Oil tanker)	26 (oil)	Released	2013-03-10	$9.5 million (unknown payment made)
MV Smyrni, with a crew of 26, was carrying 135,000 tonnes of crude oil when she was hijacked on 11 May 2012. After ten months of being held in a pirate anchorage off the Somali coast, it is understood that a ransom was paid for the vessel, and on Sunday 10 March 2013, she was released by her armed pirate captors.

== October ==
Image	Flag (owner)	Name (class)	Crew (cargo)	Status	Date of attack	Coordinates
Image	Flag (owner)	Name (class)	Crew (cargo)	Status	Date of release	Ransom demanded
	Luxembourg	Bourbon Liberty 249 (anchor handling vessel)	6 Russians, 1 Estonian (none)	Crew released	2012-10-20	unknown
	Luxembourg	Bourbon Liberty 249 (anchor handling vessel)	6 Russians, 1 Estonian (none)	Crew released	2012-11-01	{{{ransom}}}
On 15 October 2012, the Bourbon Liberty 249 was hijacked while off of the coast of Pennington, Nigeria. With the collaborating assistance of Nigerian, Russian, Estonian, Luxemburg and French Governments, the ship's crew were rescued.

== November ==
Image	Flag (owner)	Name (class)	Crew (cargo)	Status	Date of attack	Coordinates
Image	Flag (owner)	Name (class)	Crew (cargo)	Status	Date of release	Ransom demanded
	Malta (United States)	Azamara Journey (cruise ship)	407 ()	Attack failed		unknown
Azamara Journey, a cruise ship owned by Azamara Club Cruises, a subsidiary of Royal Caribbean Cruises Ltd., was approached on 26 November 2012 by several small pirate skiffs off the coast of Oman. After taking evasive maneuvers and firing at least three warning flares, the pirates ceased their attack.
