= October 2017 Mogadishu bombings =

October 2017 Mogadishu bombings may refer to:

- 14 October 2017 Mogadishu bombings
- 28 October 2017 Mogadishu attacks
