= 2017 timeline of the Somali Civil War =

This is a 2017 timeline of events in the Somali Civil War (2009–present).

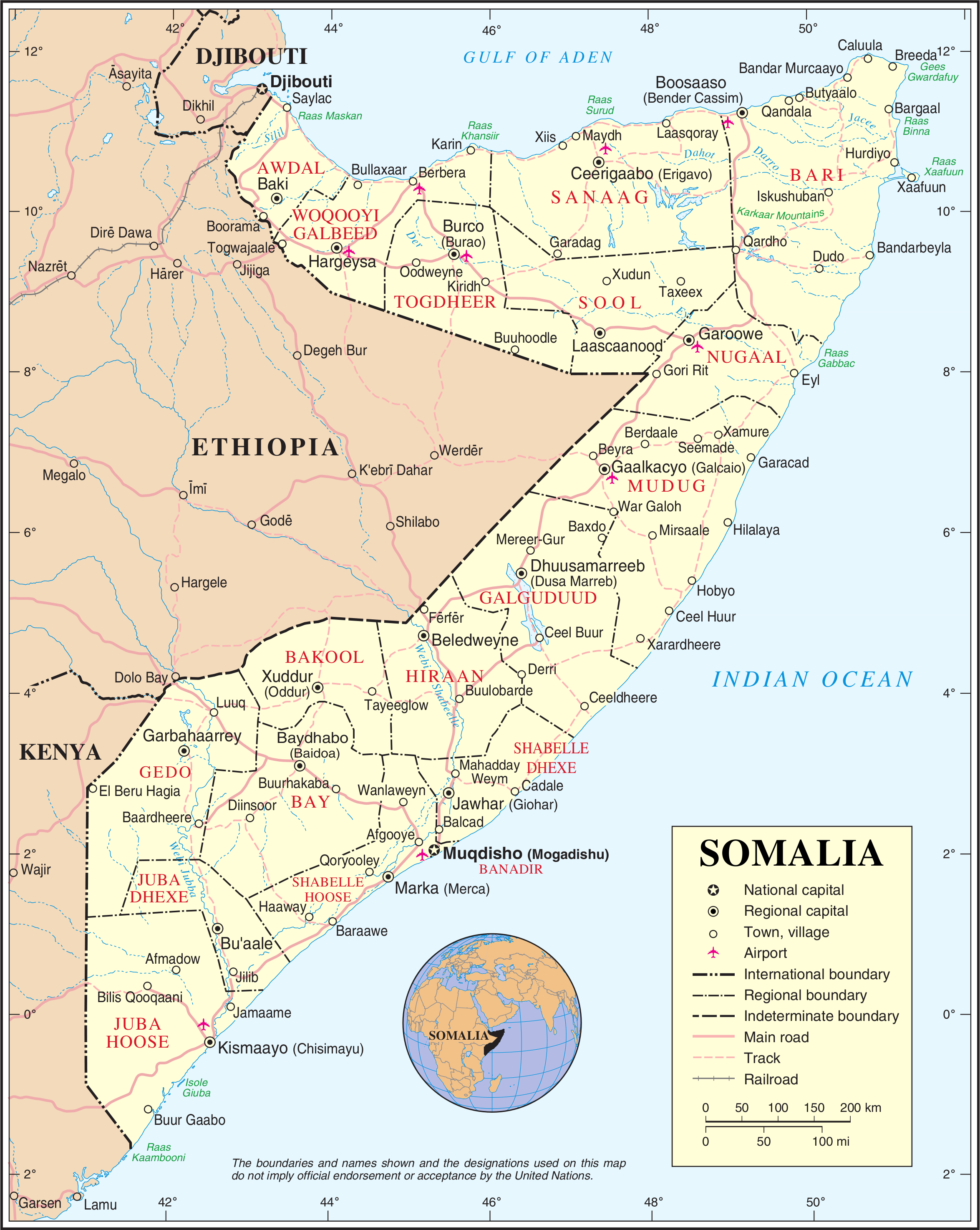
General map of Somalia

== January ==
- January 25 – At least 28 people are killed in an al-Shabaab attack on a hotel in Mogadishu.
- January 27 – Al-Shabaab militants kill dozens of Kenyan troops in a raid in southern Somalia's African Union base.

== February ==
- February 8 – Unidentified gunmen raid a hotel in Bosaso killing four guards and 2 militants. Officials blame al-Shabaab although the group denied having orchestrated the attack.
- February 19 – A car bomb explodes outside a market in the Wadajir District, killing at least 39 people and injuring 50 more.
- February 27 – A car bomb explodes near Mogadishu's army checkout point wounding 4 Somali soldiers after al-Shabaab vows an attack.

== March ==
- March 13 – At least 6 people are killed and four others wounded from a vehicle filled with explosives exploding near a hotel in Mogadishu.
- March 14 – Pirates seize a United Arab Emirates owned oil tanker, Aris 13, kidnapping 8 Sri Lankan crew members. This is the first incident of piracy off the coast since 2012.
- March 16 – The pirates that seized Aris 13 free the vessel without a ransom.
- March 21 – A car bomb explodes outside President Mohamed Abdullahi Mohamed's official residence at Villa Somalia, killing at least five people.

== April ==
- April 3 – Somali pirates hijack an Indian owned cargo ship off the coast of Puntland.
- April 7 – A mortar attack suspected to have been perpetrated by al-Shabaab kills three civilians and injures five more in the Wadajir District.
- April 9 – An al-Shabaab car bomb outside the Ministry of Defence in Mogadishu kills 15 people.
- April 10 – An al-Shabaab militant kills 9 soldiers in a suicide bomb attack in a military training camp in Mogadishu.
- April 14 – The United States begins deploying troops to help the Somali government fight al-Shabaab, the first time since 1994.

== May ==
- May 3 – Somali Public Works Minister Abbas Abdullahi Sheikh Siraji is shot dead by Somali forces mistaking him for a militant.
- May 6 – A United States Navy SEAL is killed and three others injured in a gunfight with al-Shabaab in Mogadishu. This is the first time an American soldier was killed in combat in Somalia since 1993.

== June ==
- June 8 – An al-Shabaab attack on a military base in Puntland leaves at least 70 people dead in what Somali officials call the deadliest attack in the country for years.
- June 14 – In Mogadishu, a suicide car bomb explodes outside Posh Treats, an eatery and night club also operating as a guest house. Five al-Shabaab gunmen then raid Pizza House, a neighboring pizza restaurant and nightclub. The gunmen took hostages and holed up for 11 hours, killing 31 civilians and five security force members in the process, many at point-blank range. All five gunmen are ultimately killed by security forces.

== July ==
- July 30 – A car bomb explodes near a police station in Mogadishu resulting in at least 6 fatalities and 13 injuries.

== September ==
- September 29 – At least 15 soldiers are killed in an al-Shabaab raid on a Somali military base in Mogadishu.

== October ==
- October 14 – A truck bomb exploded outside the Safari Hotel in Mogadishu; at least 587 people are confirmed to have been killed in one of the deadliest terrorist attacks in the country to date.
- October 28 – An explosion from a truck bomb occurred in Mogadishu. There were two more explosions, one from a suicide bomber. These bombings killed at least 25 people and injured 30.

== See also ==
- Operation Indian Ocean
- Somali Civil War (2009–present)
