= Astral Aviation =

Kenyan cargo airline

IATA	ICAO	Call sign
8V	ACP	ASTRAL CARGO
- Founded: November 2000; 25 years ago
- Hubs: Jomo Kenyatta International Airport; Hong Kong International Airport
- Focus cities: Al Maktoum International Airport; O.R. Tambo International Airport; Sharjah International Airport
- Subsidiaries: Pradhaan Air Express
- Fleet size: 3
- Destinations: 25 (excl. Charters)
- Headquarters: Jomo Kenyatta International Airport, Nairobi, Kenya
- Key people: Sanjeev S. Gadhia (CEO)
- Website: Astral Aviation

Astral Aviation is a cargo airline based in Nairobi, Kenya. It was established in November 2000 and started operations in January 2001. It operates scheduled and non-scheduled/ad-hoc cargo charters, as well as humanitarian-aid flights, to regional destinations in Africa, Asia and to Liège in Belgium as its only European destination, as of 2023. Its main base is Jomo Kenyatta International Airport, Nairobi. It has one subsidiary operating in India since October 2022, Pradhaan Air Express, which leased an Airbus A320P2F cargo aircraft, thus making it the world's first airline to have such an aircraft in its fleet.

== History ==
Founded in November 2000, Astral Aviation acquired its Air Operators Certificate (AoC) and Air Service License (ASL) from the Kenya Civil Aviation Authority in January 2001, thus it started operations in the same year in the same month. It was designated as a cargo airline by the Ministry of Roads, Transport and Public Works in November 2006.

== Services ==
The airline operates through and non-stop to 25 regular destinations and 5 charter destinations used for charter operations carrying food, electronics and medical supplies, as well as humanitarian support.

It has one subsidiary operating in India based in New Delhi, Pradhaan Air Express, since October 2022. Two more subsidiaries are planned to be launched, taking the number to three subsidiaries by 2025. Its second subsidiary will be Suid Cargo Airlines based in Johannesburg, which will operate to more than 20 destinations in Southern and Eastern Africa, is expected to be launched by September 2023. A third subsidiary airline was announced for launch in 2025

== Destinations ==
Astral shows the following scheduled and charter destinations in their 2023 online timetable and announcements.

Country	City	Airport	Notes
Australia	Brisbane	Brisbane Airport	Charter
Belgium	Liège	Liège Airport	
China	Guangzhou	Guangzhou Baiyun International Airport	Charter
Djibouti	Djibouti City	Djibouti–Ambouli International Airport	Charter
Hong Kong	Hong Kong	Hong Kong International Airport	Hub
India	Delhi	Indira Gandhi International Airport	
India	Mumbai	Chhatrapati Shivaji Maharaj International Airport	
Israel	Tel Aviv	Ben Gurion Airport	
Kazakhstan	Aktobe	Aktobe International Airport	
Kenya	Eldoret	Eldoret International Airport	
Kenya	Nairobi	Jomo Kenyatta International Airport	Hub
Malawi	Lilongwe	Kamuzu International Airport	
Mozambique	Maputo	Maputo International Airport	
Mozambique	Pemba	Pemba Airport	
Rwanda	Kigali	Kigali International Airport	
Somalia	Hargeisa	Hargeisa International Airport	Charter
Somalia	Mogadishu	Aden Adde International Airport	
South Africa	Johannesburg	O. R. Tambo International Airport	Focus city
South Sudan	Juba	Juba International Airport	
Sudan	Khartoum	Khartoum International Airport	Charter
Tanzania	Dar es Salaam	Julius Nyerere International Airport	
Tanzania	Mwanza	Mwanza Airport	
Tanzania	Zanzibar	Abeid Amani Karume International Airport	
Uganda	Kampala	Entebbe International Airport	
United Arab Emirates	Dubai	Al Maktoum International Airport	Focus city
United Arab Emirates	Sharjah	Sharjah International Airport	Focus city
United Kingdom	London	Stansted Airport	Terminated
Yemen	Aden	Aden International Airport	Charter
Zambia	Lusaka	Kenneth Kaunda International Airport	
Zimbabwe	Harare	Robert Gabriel Mugabe International Airport	

== Fleet ==
=== Current fleet ===
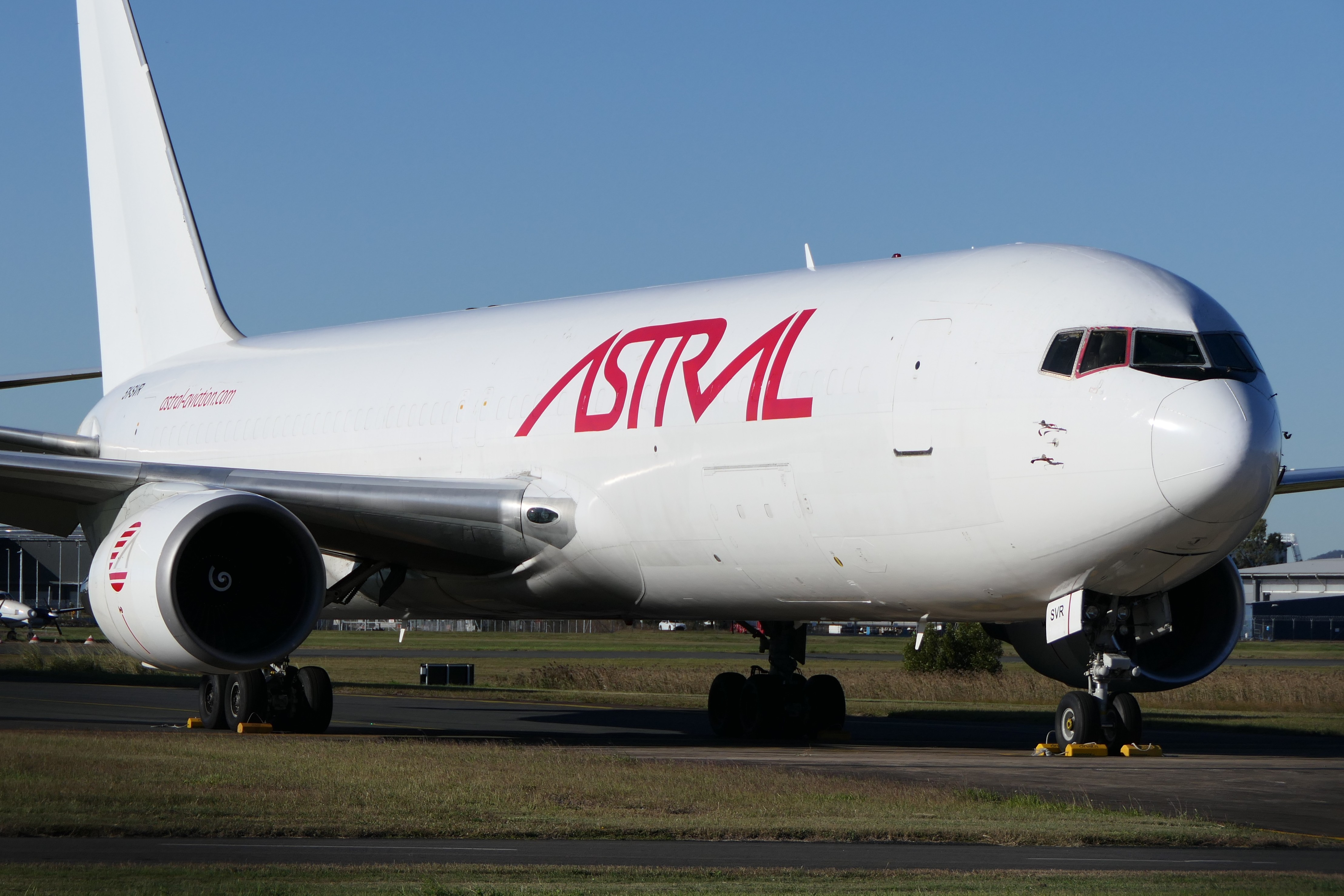
Astral Aviation 767-300F At Brisbane Airport

As of July 2026, Astral Aviation operates the following aircraft:

Astral Aviation fleet
Aircraft	In fleet	Orders	Notes
Boeing 737-400SF	1	—	
Boeing 767-200BDSF	1	—	
Boeing 767-300ER(BDSF)	1	—	5Y-SVR
Embraer 190F	—	2	Deliveries expected by 2025.
Total	3	2	

=== Former fleet ===
As of August 2025, Astral Aviation operated 1 Boeing 737-400SF, 1 Boeing 767-200BDSF and 1 Boeing 767-300ER(BDSF).

The airline also previously operated the following aircraft (as of July 2023):

- 1 Boeing 727-200F
- 2 Boeing 737-400F
- 2 Boeing 747-400F, leased from Atlas Air
- 1 Fokker 27-500F, leased from AeroSpace Consortium
- 1 Fokker 27F
- 1 McDonnell Douglas DC-9-30CF

== Awards ==
The airline has won the "Africa All-Cargo Carrier of the Year" six consecutive times in 2011, 2013, 2015, 2017, 2019 and 2023, and the "Best All-Cargo Airline in Africa" in February 2023, by STAT Times International Award for Excellence in Air Cargo during Air Cargo Africa 2023 event held at Johannesburg, South Africa, from 21 to 23 February 2023.

== See also ==
- List of airlines of Kenya
- 2023 Sudan conflict
- List of conflicts in Somalia
- Yemeni Civil War (2014–present)
- COVID-19 vaccine
- United Nations Humanitarian Air Service
