= Abdikarim Yusuf Adam =

Somalian military leader

Abdikarim Yusuf Adam عبد الكريم يوسف آدم
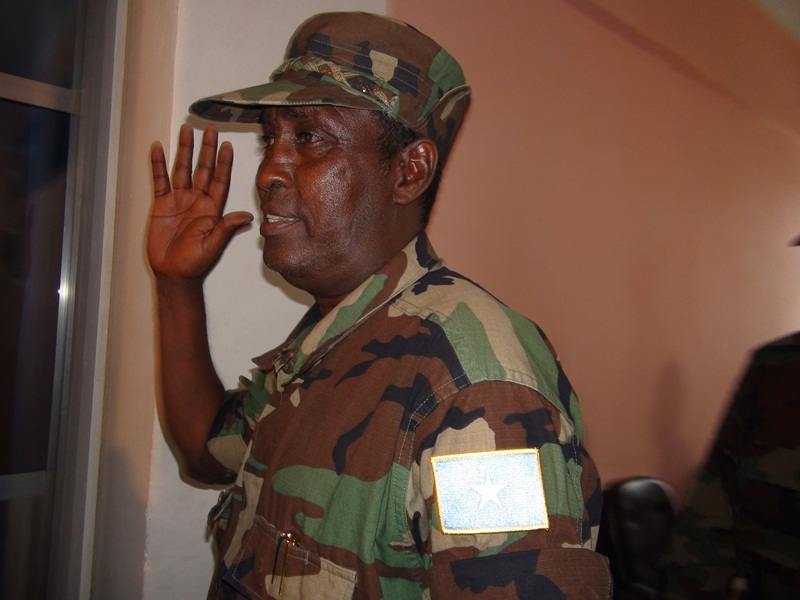
- Gen. Abdikarim Yusuf Adam in 2012
- Died: November 1, 2015; Mogadishu, Somalia
- Burial place: Herale
- Military career
- Allegiance: Federal Government of Somalia
- Branch: Somali National Army
- Rank: General
- Nickname: Dhaga-badan ("Many ears")
- Commands: Chief of Army
- Conflicts: Battle of Mogadishu (2010–2011)

General Abdikarim Yusuf Adam (Somali: Cabdikariim Yuusuf Aadam, Arabic: عبد الكريم يوسف آدم) was a Somali military official. He was the Chief of the Somali National Army. He hailed from the Surre clan.

He was killed by Al-Shabaab militants during the attack on the Sahafi Hotel on 1 November 2015.
