= January 2017 Mogadishu bombings =

January 2017 Mogadishu bombing may refer to:

- 2 January 2017 Mogadishu bombings
- Dayah Hotel attack on 25 January
