= 2008 Mogadishu bombing =

Terrorist incident in Somalia

- Mogadishu Region (or Banaadir Region), highlighted in red within Somalia.
- Location: Mogadishu, Somalia (Maka Al Mukarama Road)
- Date: August 3, 2008 (UTC+3, EAT)
- Target: Somali women
- Attack type: Roadside bombing
- Deaths: at least 21
- Injuries: 46+

The 2008 Mogadishu bombing occurred on August 3, 2008 in Mogadishu, the capital of Somalia. A roadside bombing killed 21 women who were cleaning rubbish from a southern Mogadishu street on Sunday morning, a hospital official said. Mogadishu residents gathered around victims of the bomb attack along the city's Maka Al Mukarama Road.

The bomb blast wounded another 46 people, most of them Somali women who had gathered to clean Maka Al Mukarama Road in southern Mogadishu's Kilometer 4 district, according to Medina Hospital director Dr. Dahir Dhere.

== Quotes ==
"It suddenly turned the area into a carnage, scattering body parts of the street cleaners into a large area," said witness Asha Ise Gedi. "There were pools of blood everywhere. I have never seen such mass killing."

"They were innocent poor mothers or sisters," Gedi said. "Why did they deserve this?"

== Investigation ==
It is unclear who is behind the attack.

Mogadishu Mayor Mohamed Omar Habeb Dhere, who was recently fired by the country's prime minister, blamed the Islamic Courts Union for waging the attack. But the head of the Islamist insurgent group, Abid Rahim Ise Adow, denied any involvement and blamed Somalia's government for orchestrating the attack.

The victims were participating in a program that allows Somali women to work as street cleaners in exchange for food. The United Nations' World Food Program organized the program, which began last year and is administered by Mogadishu's regional authority.
