= November 2016 Mogadishu car bombing =

Terrorist incident in Somalia

November Mogadishu car bombing
- Part of Somali Civil War (2009–present)
- Location: Waberi District, Mogadishu, Somalia
- Date: 26 November 2016
- Target: Police station
- Attack type: Car Bombing
- Deaths: 20
- Injuries: Unknown
- Perpetrator: Al-Shabaab

The November Mogadishu car bombing occurred on 26 November 2016. At least 20 people were killed by the explosion of a car bomb near a market in the Somali capital Mogadishu. Medical sources told the AFP news agency that the death toll could be as high as 30.

== See also ==
- January 2016 Mogadishu attack
- February 2016 Mogadishu attack
- June 2016 Mogadishu attacks
- List of Islamist terrorist attacks
- List of mass car bombings
- List of terrorist incidents in November 2016
- Number of terrorist incidents by country
