= 2024 Mogadishu tea shop bombing =

2024 terrorist attack at a tea shop in Mogadishu, Somalia

- Part of Somali Civil War (2009–present)
- Location: 2°2′56″N 45°17′5.64″E; Daynile, Mogadishu, Somalia
- Date: 17 August 2024; 2 years ago 2:15 p.m. (UTC+3)
- Attack type: Suicide bombing
- Deaths: 21+, including the bomber
- Injuries: 10+
- Perpetrator: Al-Shabaab
- Motive: Terrorism in Somalia

On August 17, 2024, at around 2:15pm local time, an explosion caused by an improvised explosive device (IED) planted by Al-Shabaab killed 20 people at a tea shop in Daynile District in northwest Mogadishu. Another 10 people were seriously injured in the attack, and the death toll is expected to rise due to the severity of the injuries. This was Al-Shabaab's second-largest attack in Mogadishu in August, following an attack on Lido Beach.

== Background ==
UN security advisories warned staff about potential terrorist attacks, advising them to avoid public events and government offices. This warning comes shortly after an Al-Shabaab attack on Beach View hotel at Lido Beach, Mogadishu, where over 44 people were killed. Al-Shabaab, although pushed out of Mogadishu, still controls some regions in South Somalia and continues to attack government buildings and places associated with Western culture, such as hotels and restaurants.

== Attack ==
On Saturday, 17 August 2024, 2:15pm (East Africa Time), an improvised explosive device (IED) planted by Al-Shabaab killed more than Twenty people and 10 others injured. A police officer named Mohamud Ahmed talked to Anadolu Agency and said the IEDs happened at a tea shop in the Daynile district.

The tea shop was busy when the explosions occurred. The police said the bomb was placed inside the tea shop. Many local people and some security forces who often visit this tea shop were among the victims.

=== Reactions ===
The Egyptian Ministry of Foreign Affairs sent condolences to the victims' families and the Federal Government of Somalia after the attack. They also wished the injured a quick recovery.

Egypt expressed its full support for Somalia in fighting terrorism and working towards security and stability for the Somali people.

== See also ==
- 2023 Mogadishu tea shop bombing
