= 2024 Lido Beach attack =

Mogadishu Beach View Attack

- Part of Somali civil war (2009–present)
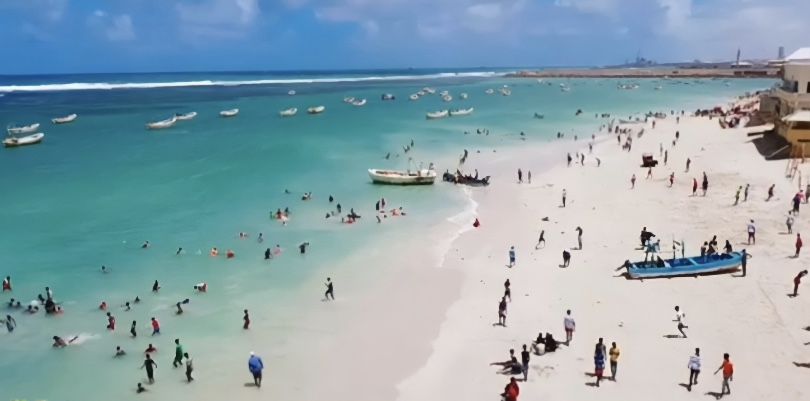
- Lido Beach (2020)
- Native name: Weeraradii Xeebta Liido
- Location: 2°2′25″N 45°21′49″E; Lido Beach, Mogadishu Somalia
- Date: 2 August 2024; 2 years ago (EAT)
- Target: Beach View Hotel, Lido Beach
- Attack type: Suicide bombing; mass shooting; shootout
- Deaths: 56+ (Including 6 perpetrators)
- Injuries: 212+
- Perpetrator: Al-Shabaab
- No. of participants: 7

On 2 August 2024, Al-Shabaab attacked Lido Beach in Somalia's capital Mogadishu. The attack started with a suicide bombing, followed by a mass shooting inside a hotel. Explosions and gunfire shook a hotel near the beach, with restaurants and other hotels in the area also being targeted. A suicide bomber blew themselves up near the Beach View Hotel, leading to the deaths of at least 50 people and injuries to hundreds of others.

It was the deadliest attack in the Horn of Africa since twin car bombs detonated near a busy market intersection in October 2022, killing at least 121 people and wounding 350 others.

== Background ==
Jihadist group Al-Shabaab began an insurgency in 2006, joining the Somali Civil War to impose Sharia law.

Lido Beach is a common spot to visit in Mogadishu, especially busy on Friday nights. The area has been targeted by Al-Shabaab militants before. The most recent attack before this one was in June 2023, when nine people were killed.

Beach View Hotel, a popular place on Lido Beach in Mogadishu. It is often visited by government officials and civilians. Al-Shabaab attacks locations like this to cause fear and instability, get attention for their cause, and show that they can attack even well-protected hotels and restaurants.

== Attack ==
The attack started when a suicide bomber exploded at the entrance of the Beach View Hotel, Other attackers tried to enter the hotel and also shot and killed people on the beach. Security forces engaged in a shootout, reportedly killing some militants.

== Aftermath ==
Security forces safely deactivated a vehicle that was full of explosives. One of those killed was a soldier. The suicide bomber and the five gunmen were killed, while a seventh attacker, an attempted suicide car bomber, was arrested.

A protest was held at the site of the attack on 5 August, with demonstrators calling for stronger security measures.

=== UK in Somalia ===
The Foreign, Commonwealth and Development Office (FCDO) advises those in Mogadishu to remain vigilant and avoid crowded areas following the Top Coffee bombing in July and the Lido Beach attack.

== Reactions ==
=== Domestic ===
The President of Puntland, Said Abdullahi Deni, along with former Presidents Mohamed Abdullahi Mohamed and Sharif Sheikh Ahmed, and former Prime Ministers Abdiweli Gaas, Omar Sharmarke, and Hassan Ali Khaire, have all condemned the recent attack. Former Minister of Planning Abdirahman Abdishakur, as well as other government officials, also condemned the attack. However, the current President, Hassan Sheikh Mohamud, has not yet responded.

=== International ===
Moussa Faki Mahamat, chair of the African Union Commission, expressed condolences to the relatives of the victims.

The attack was condemned by the Ethiopian Prime Minister Abiy Ahmed, Djiboutian President Ismaïl Omar Guelleh, the United States, the United Kingdom, the United Nations, the United Nations Assistance Mission in Somalia, Egyptian Foreign Minister Ahmed Aboul Gheit, the Arab Parliament and the Turkish Foreign Ministry.

David Lammy
(@DavidLammy)
tweeted:

The attack on Lido Beach was a horrific and cowardly act of terrorism. My thoughts are with the victims and their families following this unforgivable tragedy. The UK stands shoulder to shoulder with Somalia in the fight against terrorism.

August 4, 2024

== See also ==
- List of terrorist incidents in 2024
- List of Islamist terrorist attacks

Other attacks in Lido Beach:

- 2023 Mogadishu hotel attack;
- April 2022 Mogadishu bombing;
- 2020 Mogadishu hotel attack.
- January 2016 Mogadishu attack.
