= Madina Hospital =

Hospital in Mogadishu, Somalia

Geography
- Location: Wadajir District, Benadir, Somalia

Organisation
- Care system: Public Hospital

Services
- Beds: 400

History
- Opened: May 25, 1968

Links
- Website: https://madinahospital.so/
- Lists: Hospitals in Somalia

Madina Hospital (also known as Medina Hospital) is one of the two major hospitals in Mogadishu, Somalia.

Medina Hospital (MH) is a dedicated medical facility that handles emergencies in Mogadishu. It focuses on trauma and emergency maternal medicine, treating several hundred war-wounded patients and expectant mothers every month. Emergency cases include among other incidents such as traffic accidents, falls from heights, explosions, weapon wounds, sharp objects injuries, person to person fights, among many others.

== CMD ==
The chief medical director of Medina hospital somali is Dr. Mohamed Abdirahman Jama (Burtuqal).He was appointed as the cmd of the facility in 2024.
