= Xiang Hua Men =

History

Panama
- Name: 1987–1992: Boka; 1992–1994: Hanuman; 1994–1995: King Lion; 1995–1999: Thraki Hellas; 1999–2000: Elpis; 2000–2003: Century Fortuna; 2003–2011: Thor Navigator; 2011–2012: Xiang Hua Men; 2012–2013: Jian Ye
- Builder: Nordic Yards Warnemünde, Rostock, Germany
- Launched: May 1987
- Completed: 1987
- Identification: IMO number: 8707331; MMSI number: 354563000; Callsign: 3FUI8
- Fate: Scrapped 20 February 2013

General characteristics
- Tonnage: 15709
- Length: 76 m (249 ft 4 in)
- Beam: 13 m (42 ft 8 in)
- Capacity: 670 TEU
- Complement: 28

Xiang Hua Men was a Panamanian flagged cargo vessel, owned by the Nanjing Ocean Shipping Company, headquartered in Jiangsu Province, China. She was hijacked by Somali pirates on April 7, 2012. The capture of Xiang Hua Men was described as remarkable by the ship's owners, as the vessel was outside the "globally recognized 'pirate zone.'" China Daily reported that nine pirates exchanged fire with Iranian commandos, from two Iranian Navy patrol vessels, prior to throwing their weapons overboard.

Xiang Hua Men had a complement of 28 mariners. Early reports said it was unknown if any of the crew had been injured, or what became of the pirates. China Daily reported the crew members shut down all power systems and retreated to the ship's security room when they saw the pirates approach. The vessel was occupied by the pirates for nine hours. The pirates boarded the vessel 25 minutes after they were sighted, and it took them three hours to breach three of the four security doors to the ship's security room. At that point the crew surrendered, and the pirates made them line the bridge, to serve as human shields.

The ship's captain noticed the two Iranian patrol vessels were shadowing the ship. The ship's engineer told the pirates he had to take his engineering staff to the engine room, to monitor the ship's engines. However, when the first mate, on the bridge, informed him that the Iranians had covertly requested the vessel be stopped, the engineer and his staff stopped the engines and jumped overboard. When members of the remaining crew were ordered to start the engines they claimed all the crew members qualified to do so were among those who had jumped overboard. As the Iranian boarding party approached gunfire was exchanged between the pirates and the Iranian commandos. One crew member was slightly injured. Eventually the pirates threw their weapons overboard – four AK-47s, a "bazooka" and some pistols and knives. China Daily reported the ship's owners awarded the crew a $10,000 bonus.
