= Lido Beach, Mogadishu =

Beach in Somalia

Lido Beach, Mogadishu Xeebta Liido (Somali)
- Beach
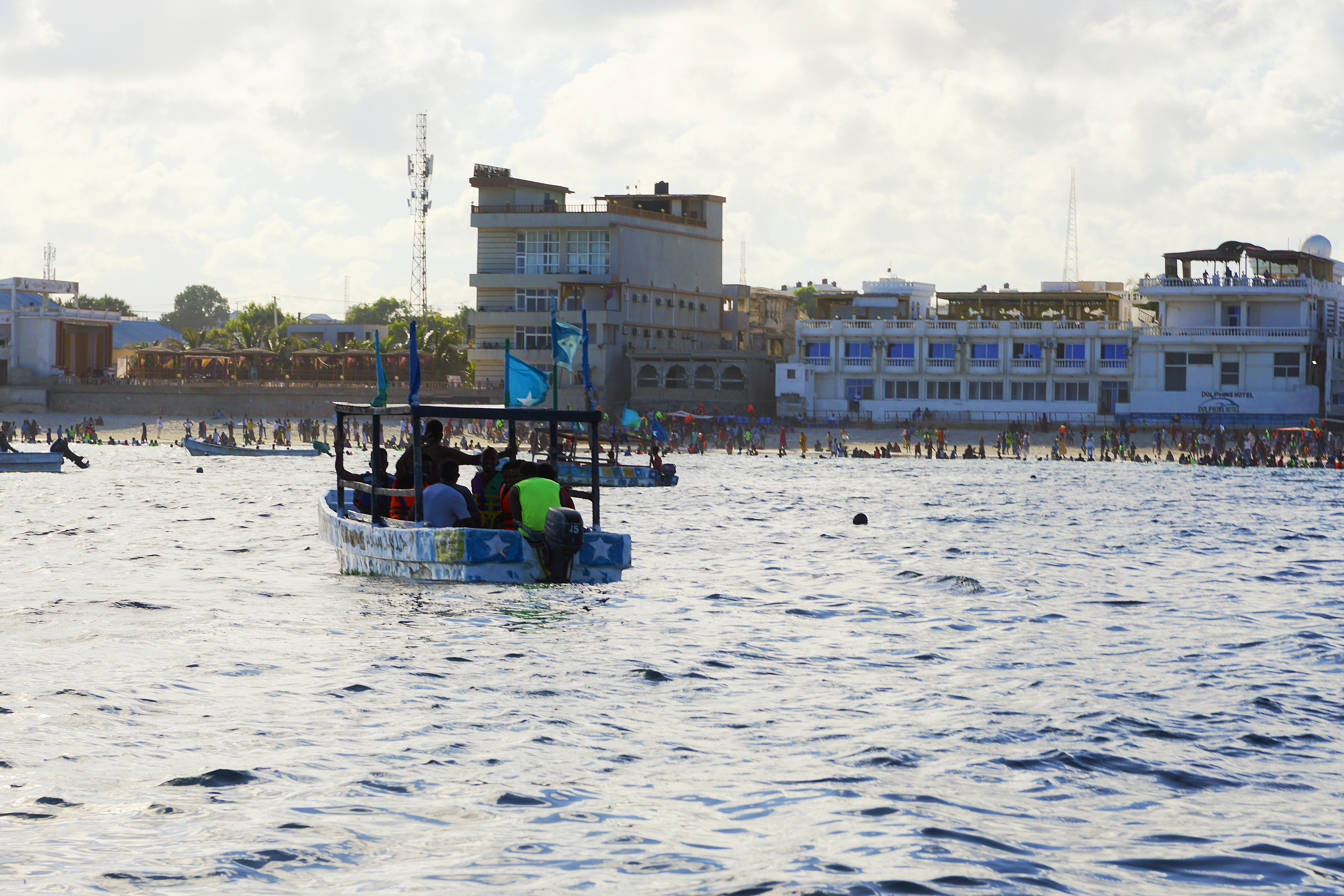
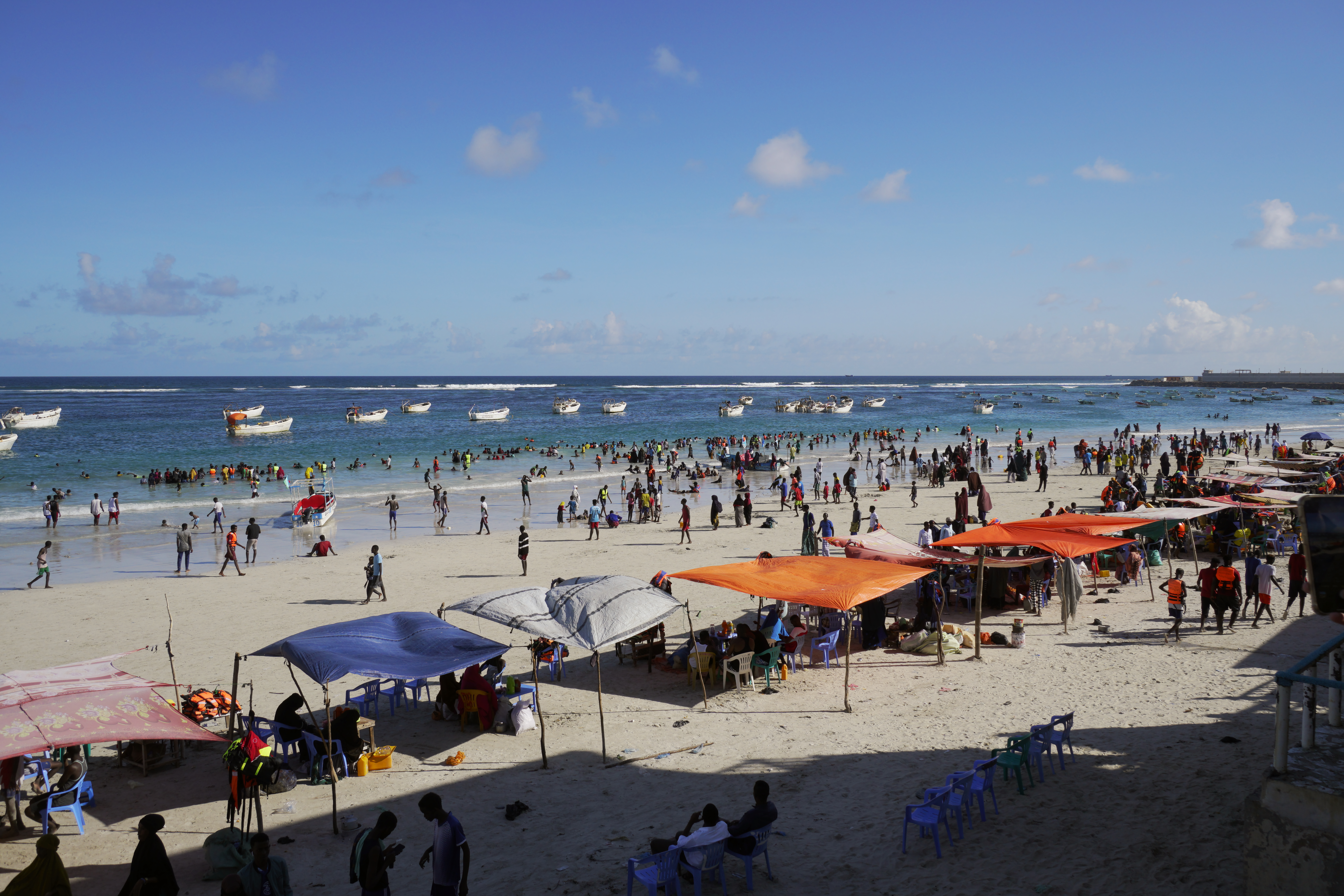
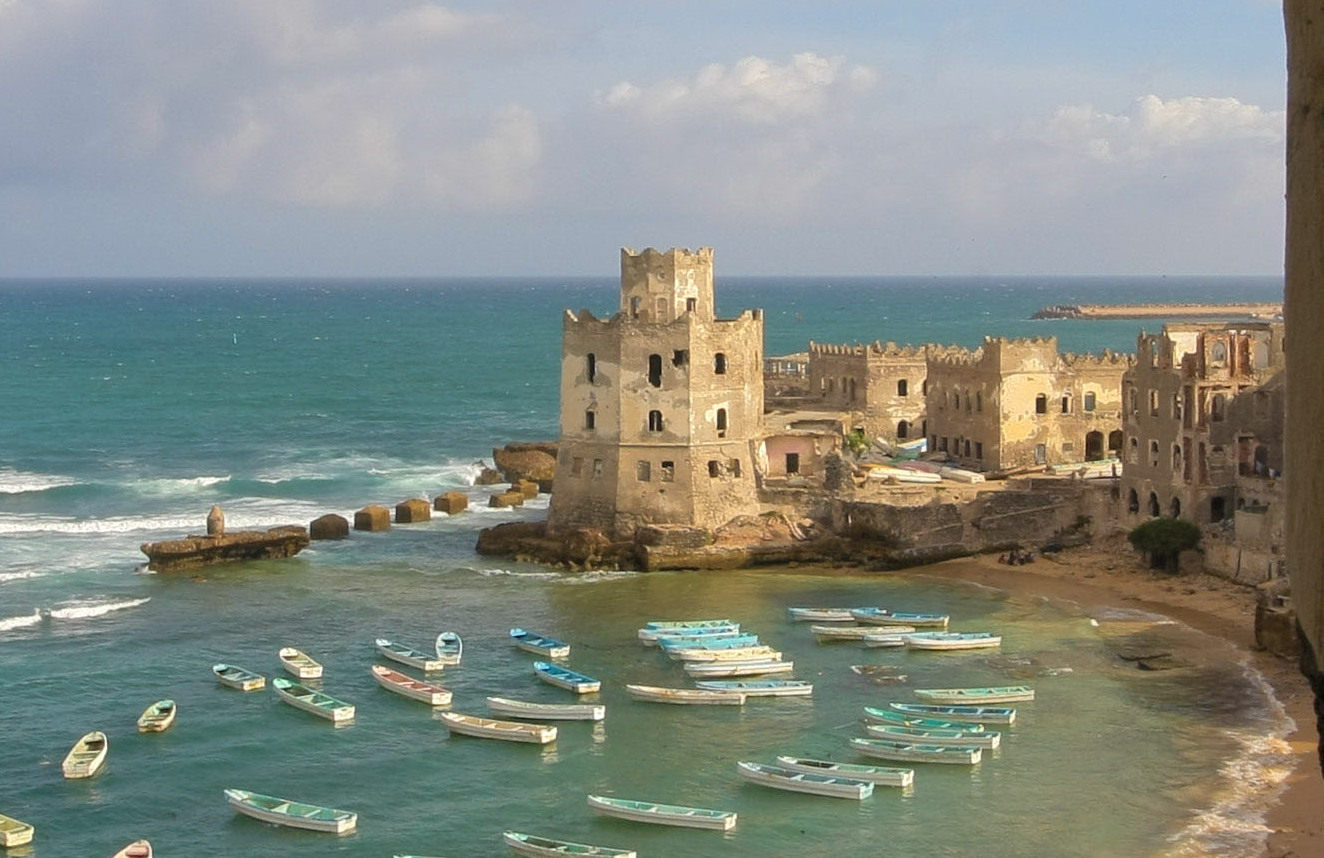
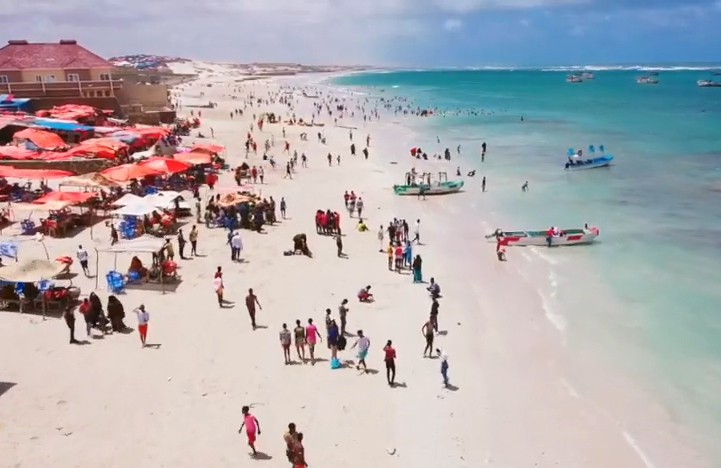
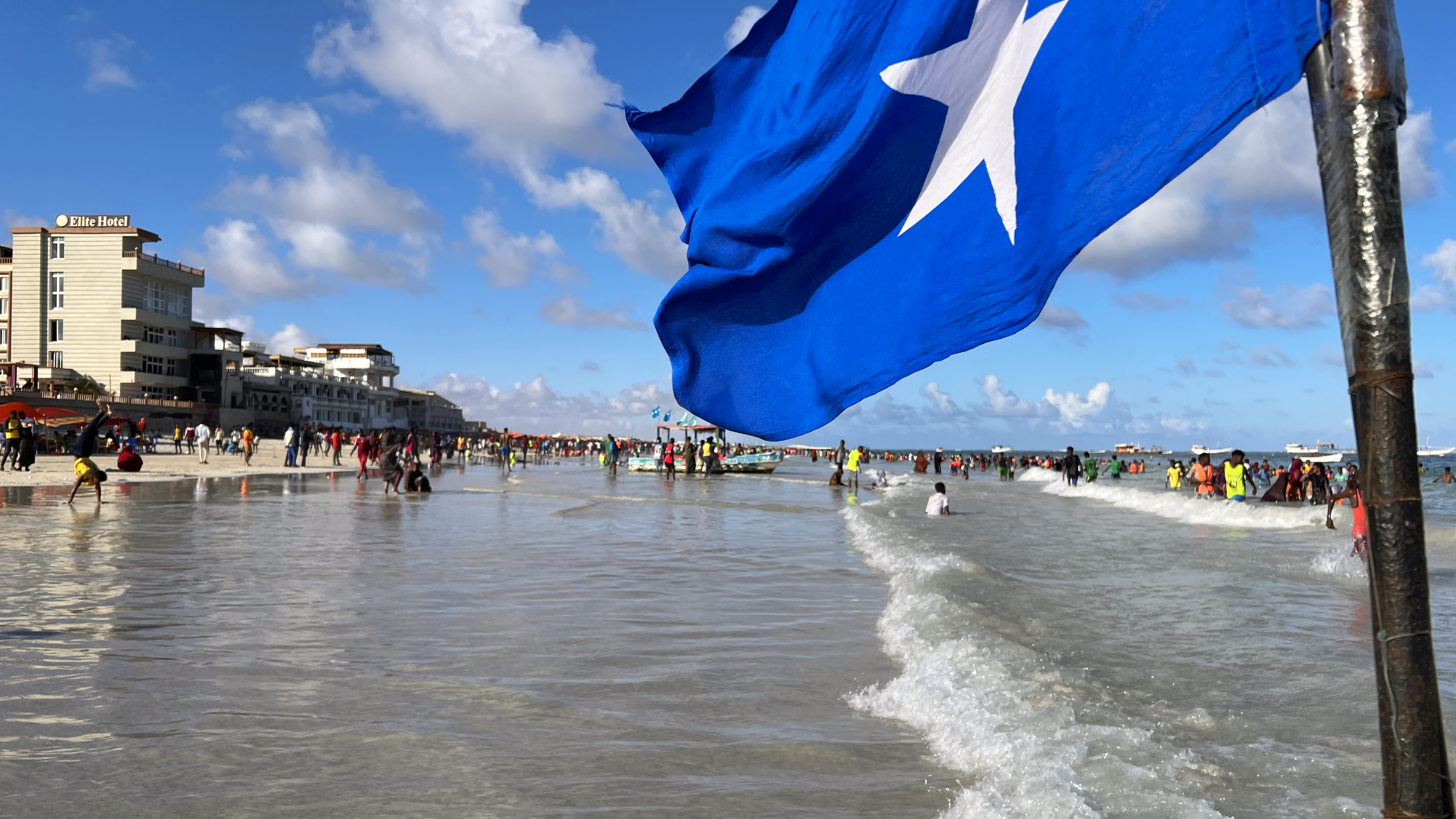

- Location within Somalia
- Coordinates: 2°2′25″N 45°21′49″E
- Location: Mogadishu, Somalia

Lido Beach (Somali: Xeebta Liido) is a beach in Somalia's capital, Mogadishu, which overlooks the Somali Sea. It derives its name (Italian: Lido) from the Italian word for "beach". Commonly, the name Liido is colloquially used by locals.

== History ==
The beach in northern Mogadishu was initially developed in the late 1930s for the Italian colonists living in the capital of the then-protectorate of Italian Somalia.

In the 1950s, it was fully developed by the Italian administration under United Nations rule, with the enlargement of a nearby hotel that was Mogadishu's tallest building during those years.

After decades of civil war and anarchy in the capital, the beach fell into disuse. However, it has experienced a revival in the last decade.

In February 27, 2025, security guards of Villa Somalia opened fire on civilians on the beach while attempting to clear the area ahead of a visit by the Ethiopian Prime Minister, killing an adolescent boy and wounding several others.

=== Al-Shabaab attacks ===
In January 2016, al-Shabaab carried out a suicide car bombing and mass shooting at a restaurant, killing about 20 people.

In August 2020, al-Shabaab attacked a hotel, detonating a car bomb and engaging in a firefight with Somali security forces. Eleven victims and five attackers were killed; over 200 people were rescued by Somali special forces. The United Nations Secretary-General's Special Representative for Somalia, James Swan, strongly condemned the terrorist attack and said the UN "expressed its deepest condolences to the families of the victims."

In April 2022, a restaurant was attacked by an al-Shabaab suicide bomber. In June 2023, a hotel was attacked by militants.

On August 2, 2024, a suicide bombing and mass shooting occurred at the beach and the Beach View Hotel by Al-Shabaab militants leaving at least 56 people dead, including six of the seven militants and a soldier. According to Twitter posts, heavy gunfire and explosions could be heard at the beach and at least 18 bodies could be seen in videos and pictures of the attack.

== Present ==
Many people visit Mogadishu's coastline each weekend. Somalia has the longest coastline in mainland Africa with 3100 km along the Indian Ocean, which has beaches valuable for tourism. Lido Beach has seafood restaurants, hotels, and parks. The Somali diaspora plays an important role in recovering Mogadishu, building new luxury downtown and beaches and restaurants, and many more that attract international tourists. There are many newly established businesses there.

== Gallery ==
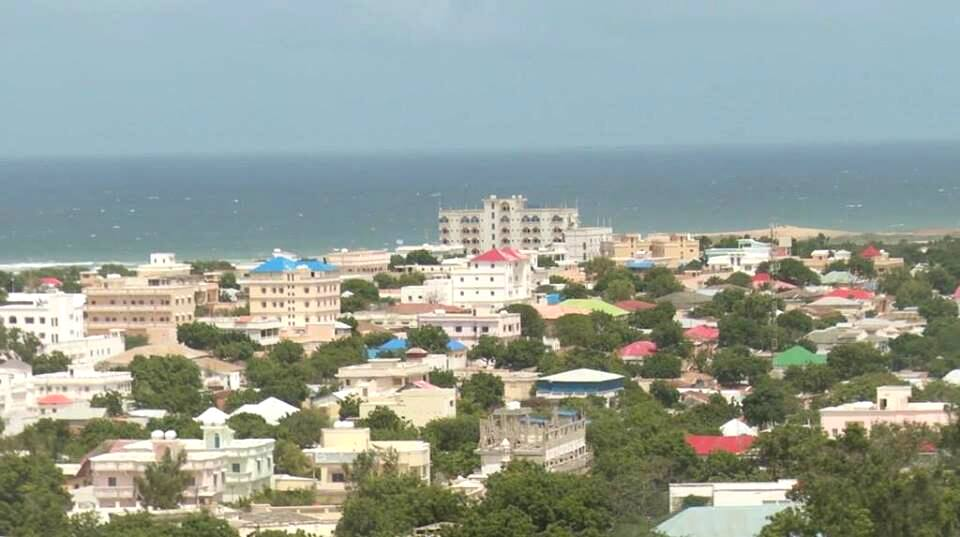
Beachfront seen in the foreground of Mogadishu's cityscape, August 2015

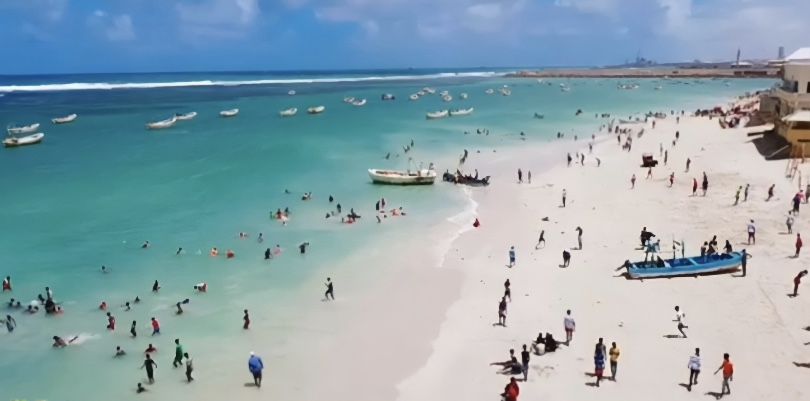
Aerial view of Lido Beach, August 2020

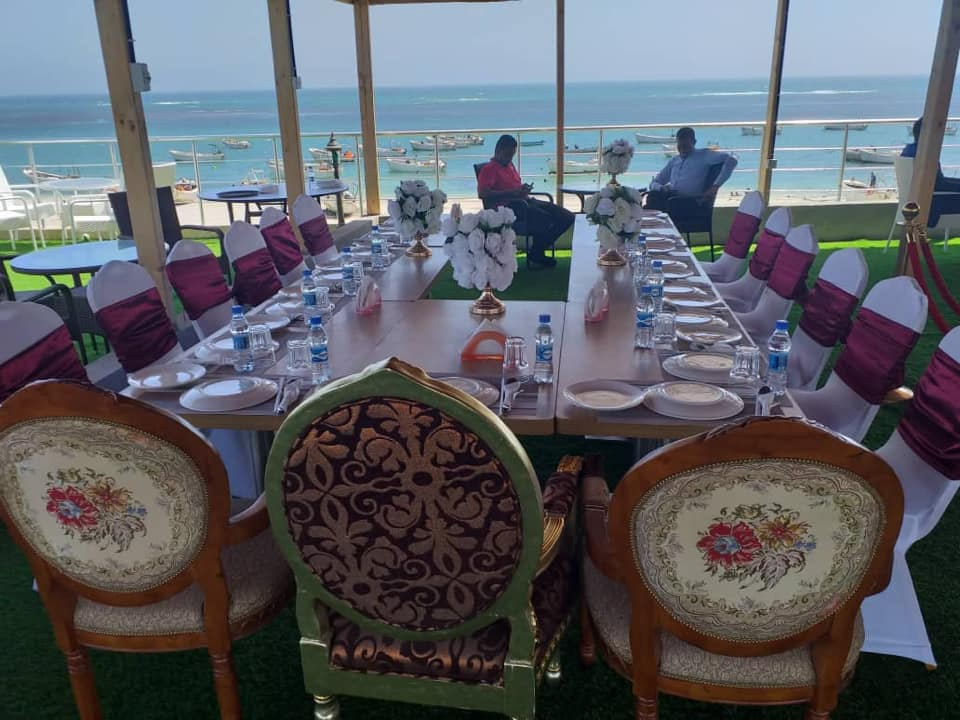
Lido beachfront from the dining area of a waterfront hotel, August 2021

== See also ==
- Jazeera Beach
