= 2023 Mogadishu tea shop bombing =

Mass murder in Somalia

- Part of the Somali Civil War
- 2023 Mogadishu tea shop bombing (Somalia)
- Location: Mogadishu, Somalia
- Date: 29 September 2023
- Target: Civilians
- Attack type: Suicide bombing
- Weapon: Explosive belt
- Deaths: 11
- Injuries: 18
- Perpetrator: Al-Shabaab

On 29 September 2023, an al-Shabaab suicide bomber detonated an explosive belt in a tea shop in the capital Mogadishu, Somalia, leaving 11 dead and 18 others injured. The explosion took place at a checkpoint leading to the parliament and the president's office.

Later that day, al-Shabaab claimed responsibility and a man was arrested who was believed to be a suspect of supplying weapons to the group and to be one main illegal arms dealers in Somalia.

== Background ==
Al-Shabaab is an al-Qaeda-affiliated Somali jihadist group who began their insurgency in 2006. They have carried out many attacks in Somalia, Ethiopia, Kenya and Uganda, most often in the Somali capital.

== See also ==
- List of terrorist incidents in 2023
- 2024 Mogadishu tea shop bombing
