= Siege of Baidoa =

Military conflict in Somalia

- Part of the War in Somalia
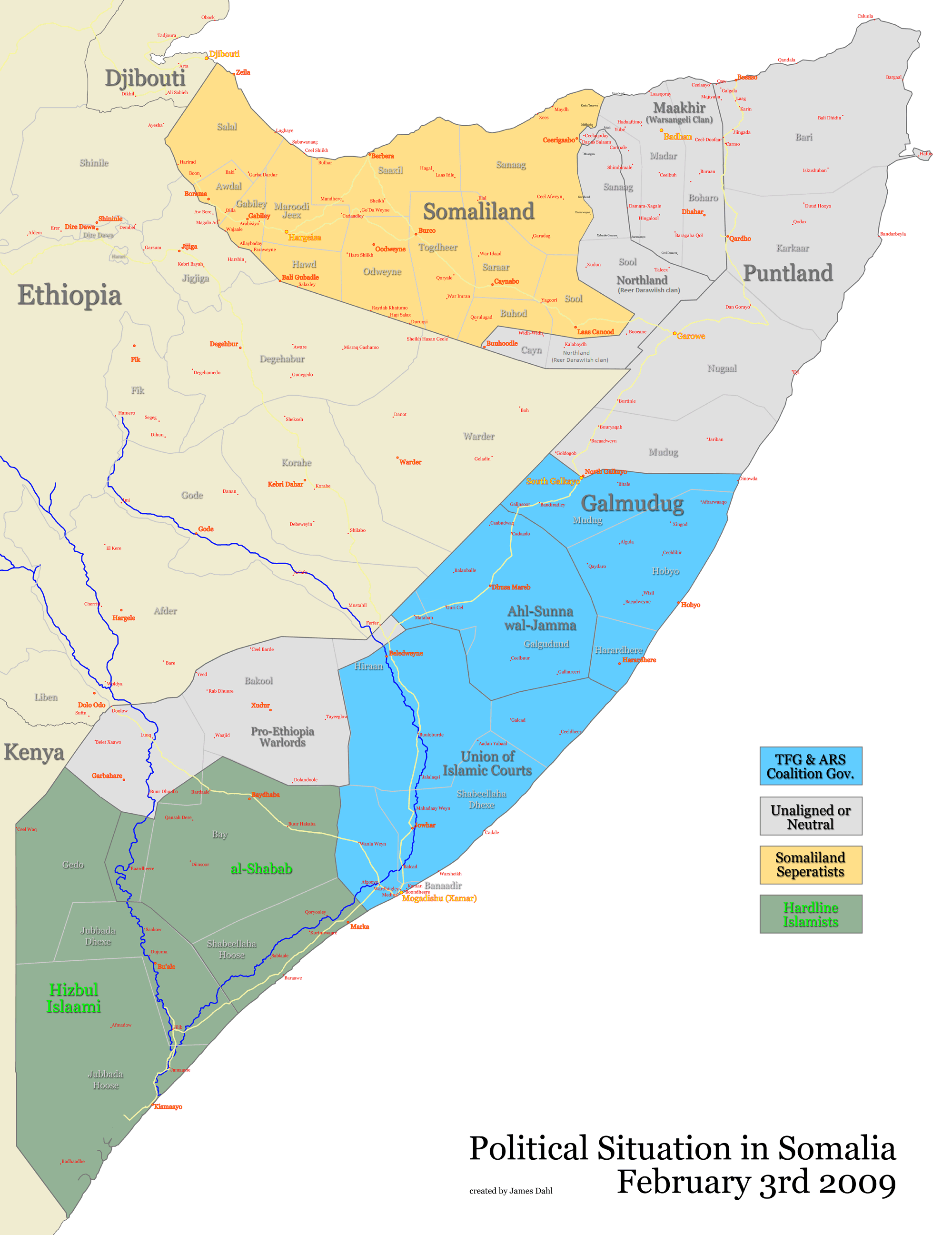
Date	July 8, 2008–January 26, 2009
Location	Bay region, Somalia 3.074444°N 43.835278°E
Result	Al-Shabaab victory; fall of Baidoa

Belligerents
Al-Shabaab	Somalia (Transitional Federal Government); Ethiopia

The siege of Baidoa was a military confrontation lasting from July 2008 to January 2009 during the Ethiopian occupation of Somalia, during which al-Shabaab laid siege to the headquarters of the Ethiopian backed Somali Transitional Federal Government (TFG).

During January 2009, the first TFG collapsed and Al-Shabaab overran the seat of the government in Baidoa.

== Timeline ==
A year after Ethiopia's invasion of Somalia, the insurgency fighting against the military occupation intensified pressure on Ethiopian National Defense Force (ENDF) and Transitional Federal Government (TFG) troops in the Bay region. Despite capturing Mogadishu from the Islamic Courts Union (ICU) at the end of 2006, many TFG ministers opted to stay in Baidoa, the provisional capital in Bay, due to the insurgency's growing threat. By mid-2008, Al-Shabaab, ICU loyalists, and supporters of the Alliance for the Re-Liberation of Somalia (ARS) emerged as the main insurgent forces across Somalia. The Mogadishu-Afgooye-Baidoa highway became a key insurgency hotspot, with escalating attacks around Baidoa city as well.

On July 8, 2008, al-Shabaab launched a midnight attack on Baidoa's presidential palace, airport and parliament with rockets and mortars, killing 11 soldiers in the encircled and vulnerable de facto capital of the Transitional Government. Baidoa Airport is considered the lifeline for the city. In the tense situation, Baidoa police opened fire on a bus that refused to stop for them, killing many on board. TFG police were known to extort money from travelers at roadblocks, and this was likely an unrelated incident.

On July 9, islamists seized a large shipment of Ethiopian arms and military vehicles from an armored convoy heading from Baledogle Airfield to Baidoa meant for the TFG military. Three Islamists were killed in the battle, as well as one confirmed government soldier dead. The convoy was attacked a second time in Wanla Weyne before finally reaching Baidoa.

On July 10, Islamists seized the control of Deynunay town, located 20 km south of Baidoa, killing one government soldier, a spokesman said.

Fierce fighting near Daynunay continued for a second day on July 11 as Islamist and TFG forces battled; three TFG soldiers were killed in the battle.

On July 13, al-Shabaab forces regrouped and reoccupied Bardhere and Burhakaba, mustering forces in these two towns en route to Baidoa, as TFG presence in these towns had long since been expelled. The United Nations Development Program (UNDP), an organisation with many years of experience in Somalia, withdrew from Baidoa due to the imminent attack.

On August 27, a bombing attack in the city left the son of a Somali MP dead along with one of his bodyguards.

On September 5, Islamist fighters attacked an Ethiopian Army convoy that recently left the city in the town of Bardale, 55 kilometers southwest of Baidoa. Two Ethiopian soldiers, two insurgents and one civilian were killed in the attack and one Ethiopian Army truck was burned. Two days later on September 7, insurgents attacked a police station in the city but there were no casualties.

On September 20, heavy fighting between Somali government troops and the insurgents killed at least two soldiers, three insurgents and one civilian in the city when a government checkpoint was attacked.

On October 2, three separate insurgent attacks in the town killed two civilians and one soldier. On October 13, more heavy fighting resulted in the deaths of four insurgents and two Ethiopian soldiers after an Ethiopian Army convoy, heading into Baidoa, was ambushed.

On December 24, a landmine killed three policemen in the city.

On January 26, 2009, Islamist forces captured Baidoa, which was by this point the last major city controlled by the Transitional Government. The city's capture came after Ethiopian troops completely pulled out of the country only a day prior. Pro-government and anti-Islamist forces remained in control of a corridor of territory along the border with Ethiopia, and most of Gedo and Bakool. Somali MP Mohamed Ibrahim Habsade and his troops, along with ten other MP's, surrendered to Islamist forces as they entered Baidoa. During the takeover, government troops and militiamen attempted to resist, resulting in fighting that left five civilians and four soldiers dead but were not able to stop the insurgent advance.
