= May 2010 Mogadishu bombings =

Attack on a mosque in Somalia

Coordinates: 2.0333°N 45.3500°E

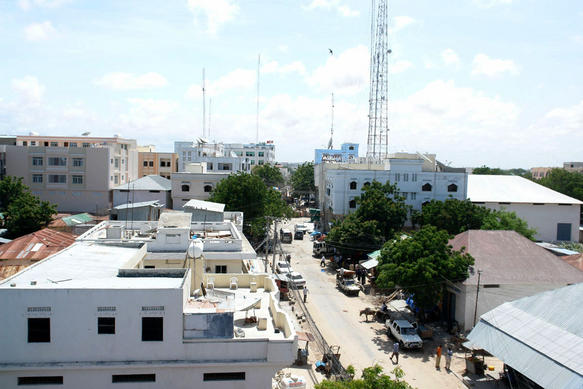
- Bakaara Market, the site of the bombings, taken sometime before 2008
- Location: Mogadishu, Somalia
- Date: 1 May 2010; 13:00 (UTC+3)
- Target: Abdala Shideye Mosque
- Attack type: Bombings
- Deaths: 39
- Injuries: 70
- Perpetrator: Unknown

The May 2010 Mogadishu bombings were an attack at a mosque near the Bakaara market in Mogadishu, the capital of Somalia, on 1 May 2010. The bombs killed at least 39 people and injured around 70 others.

== Background ==
Somalia, which has not had a functional central government since the 1991 deposing of President Siad Barre, is controlled by several different factions. The area of the capital where the bombings occurred, including the mosque and the Bakaara Market, was under the control of al-Shabaab, a militant organisation that was engaged in a struggle against the provisional Transitional Federal Government.

== Bombings ==
The bombings occurred around 1 pm local time (10:00 UTC). The bombs were placed at opposite ends of the ground floor of the Abdala Shideye Mosque as people were awaiting the Dhuhr midday prayers. It is believed that Fuad Mohamed Qalaf, an upper-level official within al-Shabaab, was the intended target of the attacks. Qalaf was reported to have suffered only minor injuries to his hands.

The attack was the deadliest in Mogadishu since the Hotel Shambo bombing in December 2009. Information Minister Dahir Mohamud Gelle said it was the first such attack in a mosque in Somalia.

== Reaction ==
Ambassador Boubacar Gaoussou Diarra, representing the African Union, said "Indiscriminate attacks on public places like today's incident cannot be condoned. I, on behalf of the African Union, would like to call upon all warring parties in the Somali Conflict to stop such barbaric attacks on innocent civilian population."

While al-Shabaab has accused private Western security firms, no group has claimed any kind of responsibility for the bombings.

== See also ==
- 2010 timeline of the War in Somalia
- 2011 Mogadishu bombing
- List of terrorist incidents, 2010
- Somali Civil War
- Somali Civil War (2009–present)
