= 2010 Kenya–Al-Shabaab border clash =

Conflict in Kenya

Date	July 20, 2010
Location	Kenya–Somalia border

Belligerents
Kenya	Al-Shabaab

Casualties and losses
1 wounded	2 killed

The 2010 Kenya–Al-Shabaab border clash occurred on July 20, 2010, when gunmen from the Al-Shabaab terrorist group attacked a Kenyan border patrol along the border area in Liboi, Lagdera. There was a subsequent fierce exchange of fire between the two sides leading to the deaths of two militia and the wounding of one Kenyan officer. Hundreds of security personnel were later deployed to the border following the clash and because of continued fighting between two militia groups in the neighboring town of Dobley, Somalia. The Islamist outfit had previously claimed responsibility for a deadly suicide bombing in Uganda in July.
