= 2020 Mogadishu hotel attack =

Mass murder in Somalia

- Location: Elite Hotel, Mogadishu, Somalia
- Date: 16 August 2020
- Target: civilians
- Attack type: siege
- Deaths: 16, including five attackers
- Injuries: 43

On 16 August 2020, Five Al-Shabaab attackers killed at least eleven people at the Elite Hotel in Lido Beach, Mogadishu, Somalia.

== Background ==
The Somali Civil War began in 1991. Al-Shabaab are a jihadist group who began an insurgency in the country in 2008, since when they have frequently carried out attacks there. The most common location of their attacks is the capital Mogadishu, and hotels are one of their favoured types of target. Less often, they attack Kenya and Uganda. They control part of southern Somalia and are trying to take over the whole country and implement a severe version of Sharia law.

== Attack ==
On 16 August 2020, Al-Shabaab detonated a car bomb at the recently built high-end Elite Hotel in Lido Beach in the Somali capital Mogadishu. They then opened fire using assault rifles. A siege lasted four hours, until all five insurgents were killed by Somali special forces; at least 43 people were injured.

== See also ==
- List of terrorist incidents in 2020
- 2020 in Somalia
