= Battle of Bargal (2007) =

Battle with the Islamic Courts in Somalia

- Part of the War in Somalia (2006–2009); Operation Enduring Freedom - Horn of Africa
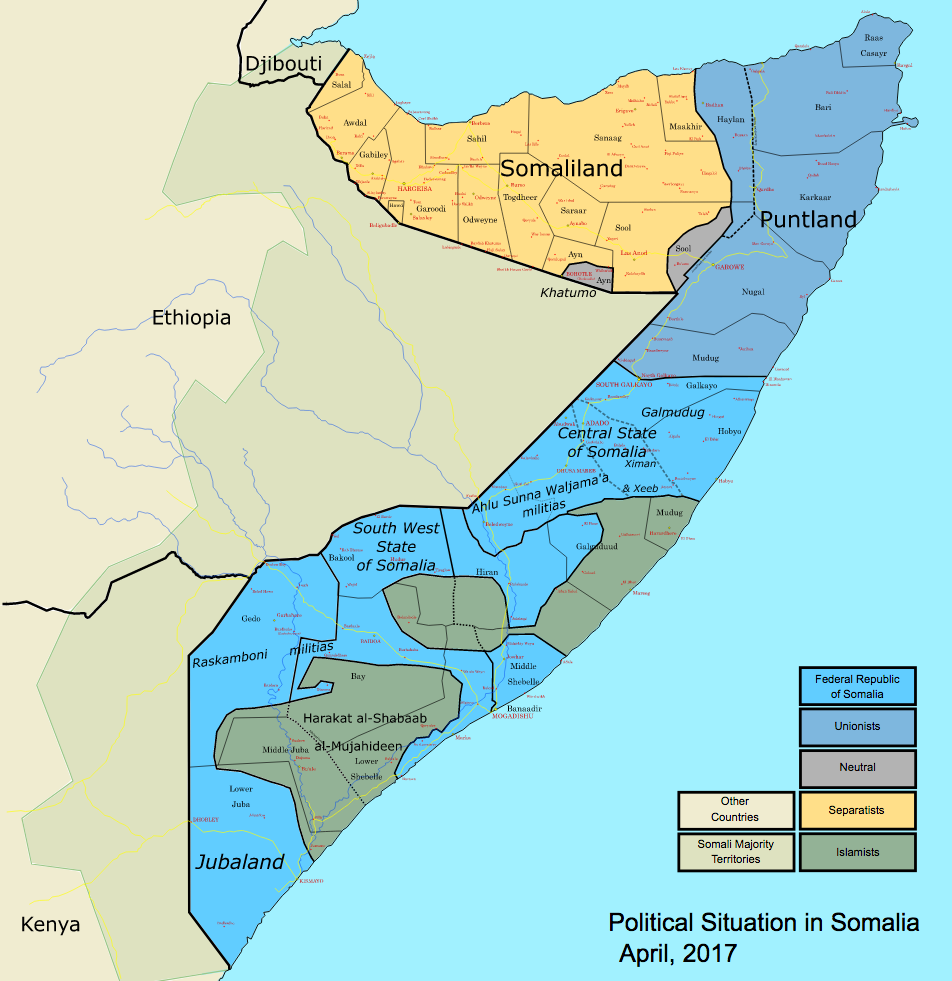
- Somalia, Bargal is at the right hand tip of the Horn.
Date	May 31 – June 3, 2007
Location	Bargal, Somalia
Result	United States/Puntland victory

Belligerents
Islamic Courts Union	Puntland; United States

Strength
12-35 insurgents	Land: unknown militia 3 US Military; Sea: 1 destroyer

Casualties and losses
12 killed	Puntland: 5 wounded United States: None

The Battle of Bargal occurred in June 2007 around the town of Bargal in the northern province of Bari, in the semi-autonomous region of Puntland.

== Battle ==
On May 30, between 12 and 35 heavily armed Islamist fighters arrived in two fishing boats from southern Somalia. They were a group of the Islamic Courts Union personnel heading to travel on further out of the country. After their boats sustained damaged from the rough seas they came ashore in Bargal where they raided a local village and clashed with locals before heading up the hills surrounding Bargal. Three members in a task force created by Tier 1 operators from multiple US Military branches (including Chris Vansant a Delta Force operator) who had been tracking the boats arrived in Bargal and with the help of a local warlord "Bashir" set up a patrol base and eventually confronted the fighters. In the fighting some of the local fighters were injured. On June 1, the Combat Controller in the 3 man US team contacted a United States Navy warship, the USS Chafee, and directed fire to the hills around Bargal where Islamist militants had set up a base. The target of the shelling may have been an al-Qaeda operative who the United States believed was involved in the 1998 bombings of US embassies in Kenya and Tanzania.

According to the Puntland regional government, as many as a dozen fighters including Somali militants as well as British nationals, Americans, Swedish, Pakistanis and Yemenis were killed in these operations, and five government troops were injured.

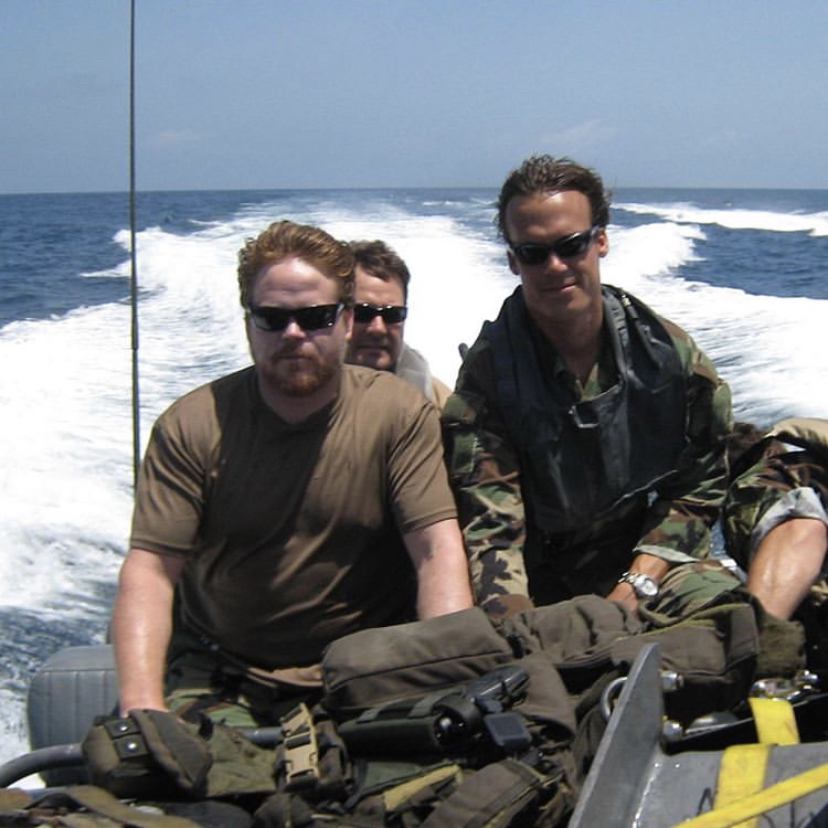
U.S. special operations personnel during maritime operations off the coast of Somalia in 2008, following the Battle of Bargal (2007).

|U.S. special operations personnel during maritime operations off the coast of Somalia in 2008, following the Battle of Bargal (2007).
