= 2023 Mogadishu hotel attack =

Mass murder by al-Shabaab in Somalia

- Part of the Somali Civil War
- Attack location
- Location: Mogadishu, Somalia
- Date: 10 June 2023
- Target: Civilians
- Attack type: Bombing, siege, shootout
- Deaths: 16 (including 7 perpetrators)
- Injuries: 10
- Perpetrator: Al-Shabaab

On 10 June 2023, al-Shabaab militants attacked a hotel in Lido Beach, Mogadishu, Somalia, resulting in the killing of six civilians, three soldiers and seven attackers.

== Background ==
Jihadist group al-Shabaab began an insurgency in 2006, trying to overthrow the internationally backed Somali government and impose a severe form of Sharia law. The Islamist group have carried out many attacks in Somalia's capital Mogadishu, targeting civilian buildings including hotels and restaurants as well as military and political targets.

== Attack ==
On the night of 9–10 June 2023, al-Shabaab attacked the popular, upmarket Pearl Beach hotel and restaurant in Mogadishu's Lido Beach. Seven gunmen attacked its restaurant after detonating a bomb there. They killed at least six civilians and three members of the security forces. By the end of the siege, 84 people were released. All the attackers were shot dead by the security forces.

== See also ==
- 2023 timeline of the Somali Civil War
- January 2016 Mogadishu attack, also in Lido Beach
- April 2022 Mogadishu bombing, also in Lido Beach
- August 2024 Lido Beach attack
