= Dayah Hotel attack =

2017 terror attack in Mogadishu, Somalia

- Part of Somali Civil War (2009–present)
- Dayah Hotel attack (Somalia) Dayah Hotel
- Location: 2°02′09.3″N 45°19′38.0″E; Mogadishu, Somalia
- Date: 25 January 2017
- Target: Dayah Hotel
- Attack type: Suicide bombing
- Weapons: Car bombs & guns
- Deaths: 28 (not including perpetrators)
- Injuries: 43
- Perpetrator: Al-Shabaab

The Dayah Hotel attack occurred on 25 January 2017 when a hotel in the Somali capital city Mogadishu was attacked by al-Shabaab gunmen and car bombs, killing 28 people and injuring 43 others. Taking place shortly after 08:00 on a Wednesday morning, the attack began when a car filled with explosives rammed the gate of the Dayah Hotel, a luxury hotel popular with politicians, and detonated. Immediately after, four armed militants attempted to storm the hotel – however Somali security guards shot the men dead before they reached it. As emergency services and journalists converged on the scene, a second car bomb detonated, causing more casualties.

Radio Andalus, a station with links to Al-Shabaab, reported that "well-armed mujahideen attacked the hotel, and now they are fighting inside the hotel." The attack came shortly before the date of the country's presidential election was due to be announced.

== See also ==
- Makka al-Mukarama hotel attack
- Jazeera Palace Hotel bombing
- June 2016 Mogadishu attacks
- February 2017 Mogadishu bombing
- Asasey Hotel attack
