= Attack on Spanish oiler Patiño =

Terrorist attack near Somalia

Attack on Patiño
- Part of Operation Atalanta
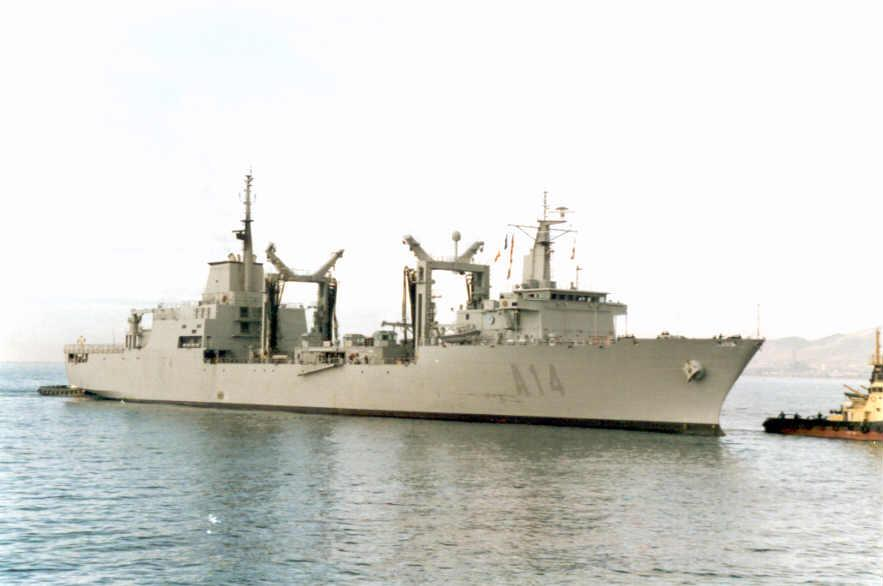
- Spanish replenishment oiler Patiño in 2004
Date	12 January 2012; 14 years ago
Location	Indian Ocean, off Somalia
Result	Spanish victory

Belligerents
Spain	Somali pirates

Commanders and leaders
(Spain) Jorge Manso Revilla	Hamoud Elfaf Mahou (POW)

Casualties and losses
None	1 killed 6 captured 1 skiff captured

On 12 January 2012 Somali pirates attacked the Spanish Navy replenishment oiler Patiño after mistaking her for a large merchant ship. The pirate skiff hit Patiño with automatic fire before being repelled, damaged by return fire and captured after a brief chase by the vessel's helicopter. The encounter took place off the coast of Somalia and ended with the death of one pirate and the capture of six others.

== Action ==
Patiño had been deployed on the Indian Ocean for her second tour as part of Operation Atalanta since November 2011, when she departed from her home port of Ferrol. Patiño was the flagship of the EU naval forces in Somali waters.

At 03:30, on 12 January 2012, while at anchor after escorting a World Food Programme ship with humanitarian aid to Mogadishu, Somalia, a sentry aboard the Spanish vessel gave the alert when he spotted a skiff alongside Patiño's hull, with the obvious intention of boarding the ship. The skiff was manned by seven individuals, who opened fire on the Spanish unit with AK-47 rifles. The pirates apparently mistook the warship for a freighter. Patiño was hit on her hull and funnel by 50 rounds in the ensuing gunbattle, which lasted up to two minutes. The Spanish vessel returned fire with her light armament, but when the pirates continued the aggression, the Spanish sailors proceeded to "neutralize" the threat with what the Spanish Ministry of Defence described as "self-defense fire", which forced the skiff to flee.

The motor boat was then chased by one of Patiño's SH-3 Sea King helicopters for 3,000 yards (2,700 m), warned by megaphone and eventually stopped after a last burst across her bows from the helicopter's machine gun. During the pursuit the attackers threw overboard three ladders, two bags and seven rifles. The Spanish personnel captured six men of whom five were wounded, three of them seriously. The pirates declared that a seventh member of the crew was killed in the exchange of fire and that his dead body fell to the sea. The skiff, damaged by gunfire, was confiscated by the Spanish authority.

== Aftermath ==
Eloy Velasco, the judge in charge of the Audiencia Nacional of Spain ordered the arrested men taken to Spain for questioning under charges of piracy, possession of illegal weapons, damage to government property, and assault on members of the security forces. Velasco considered that the attack in international waters came under Spanish jurisdiction since the assault was carried out against Spanish citizens and no current agreement with a third country prevented a Spanish trial.

An alternative trial location had been Kenya, following a May 2009 arrangement with the European Union granting Kenyan jurisdiction over acts of piracy committed in the Indian Ocean. However, in 2010 Kenya's High Court had ruled that the Kenyan government should put on trial only those subjects captured inside its territorial waters. This was overturned by the Kenyan Court of Appeal in October 2012, by which time the Spanish trial for Patiño's pirates had already commenced. During their trial in Spain, all six men pleaded not guilty, claiming they were fishermen who had approached Patiño for assistance at sea.

In October 2013 the men were convicted of attempted piracy by a Spanish Court and sentenced to eight years in jail. One man, Hamoud Elfaf Mahou, received an additional four-and-a-half-year term after also being convicted of belonging to an identified criminal organization. In April 2014 the prosecution successfully appealed the length of sentences, arguing that the piracy constituted an actual rather than attempted attack on the ship. An additional five years was added to each sentence, extending them to between thirteen and seventeen and a half years.
