= June 2016 Mogadishu attacks =

Terrorist incidents in Somalia

The June 2016 Mogadishu attacks were two similar attacks on hotels that occurred in Mogadishu, Somalia on 1 June and 25 June 2016. Dozens of people were killed in the attacks and many more were wounded.

The Ambassador Hotel was targeted on 1 June, and the Hotel Naso-Hablod on 25 June.

== 1 June attack ==
1 June 2016 Mogadishu attack
- Part of War in Somalia (2009–present)
- Date: June 1, 2016 – June 2, 2016
- Target: Ambassador Hotel
- Attack type: Car bombing, suicide bombing shooting, hostage-taking
- Deaths: 16 victims 3 terrorists
- Injuries: 55
- Perpetrator: Al-Shabaab
- No. of participants: 3

The attack came shortly after Somali officials announced that they had killed senior Al-Shabaab member Mohamed Kuno, who is believed to have been the mastermind behind the Garissa University attack. 16 other militants were killed along with Kuno.

The attack involved at least three attackers, one of whom was killed detonating the car bomb and the other two died after being shot by police inside the hotel. Most of the victims were pedestrians and drivers on the road on which the car bomb exploded. Also among the deceased victims included two Somali MPs: Abdullahi Jama Kabaweyne and Mohamoud Mohamed Gure.

The attack is one in a long list of hotel attacks committed by al-Shabaab in Mogadishu since 2015.

The attack occurred shortly before Turkey's President Recep Tayyip Erdoğan was supposed to arrive in a hotel along the same road as the Hotel Ambassador.

== 25 June attack ==
25 June 2016 Mogadishu attack
- Part of War in Somalia (2009–present)
- Location: Mogadishu, Somalia
- Date: 25 June 2016
- Target: Naso-Hablod hotel
- Attack type: Suicide bombing, car bombing, hostage-taking
- Deaths: 15+ (including attackers)
- Injuries: 25+
- Perpetrator: Al-Shabaab
- No. of participants: 4+

On 25 June 2016, Al-Shabaab conducted a similar attack on another hotel in Mogadishu. A suicide bomber detonated a car bomb outside the hotel, after which gunmen stormed the hotel and took hostages before being killed in a shootout with police. At least 15 people were killed, including State Environment Minister Bur’i Mohamed Hamza, and more than 25 were injured.

The hotel attacked was the Naso-Hablod hotel, which is frequented by tourists and politicians. At least four men were involved in the attack. The victims were mostly civilians on the street where the car bomb exploded, but also included some of the hotel's security guards.

== 30 June attack ==
30 June 2016 Mogadishu attack
- Part of War in Somalia (2009–present)
- Location: Lafoole, Mogadishu, Somalia
- Date: 30 June 2016
- Attack type: Bombing
- Deaths: at least 20

On 30 June 2016, at least 20 civilians were killed when a roadside bomb went off in Lafoole town, southwest of Mogadishu, blowing up a packed mini-bus that was passing by. Although no group claim responsibility, Al-Shabaab is suspected.

== See also ==
- 2015 Central Hotel attack
- Makka al-Mukarama hotel attack
- 2015 Jazeera Palace Hotel attack
- January 2016 Mogadishu attack
- February 2016 Mogadishu attack
