= December 2016 Mogadishu suicide bombing =

Terrorist incident in Somalia

- Part of Somali Civil War (2009–present)
- Location: Mogadishu, Somalia
- Date: 11 December 2016; 9 years ago
- Attack type: Suicide bombing
- Deaths: 29
- Injuries: 50
- Perpetrator: Al-Shabaab

At least 29 people died and another 50 were injured in a suicide bombing attack on a police station near the Port of Mogadishu. Most of the people killed and wounded in the bombing were reported to be civilians and seaport employees.
