= 14 October 2017 Mogadishu bombings =

Terrorist attacks in Somalia

- Part of Somali Civil War
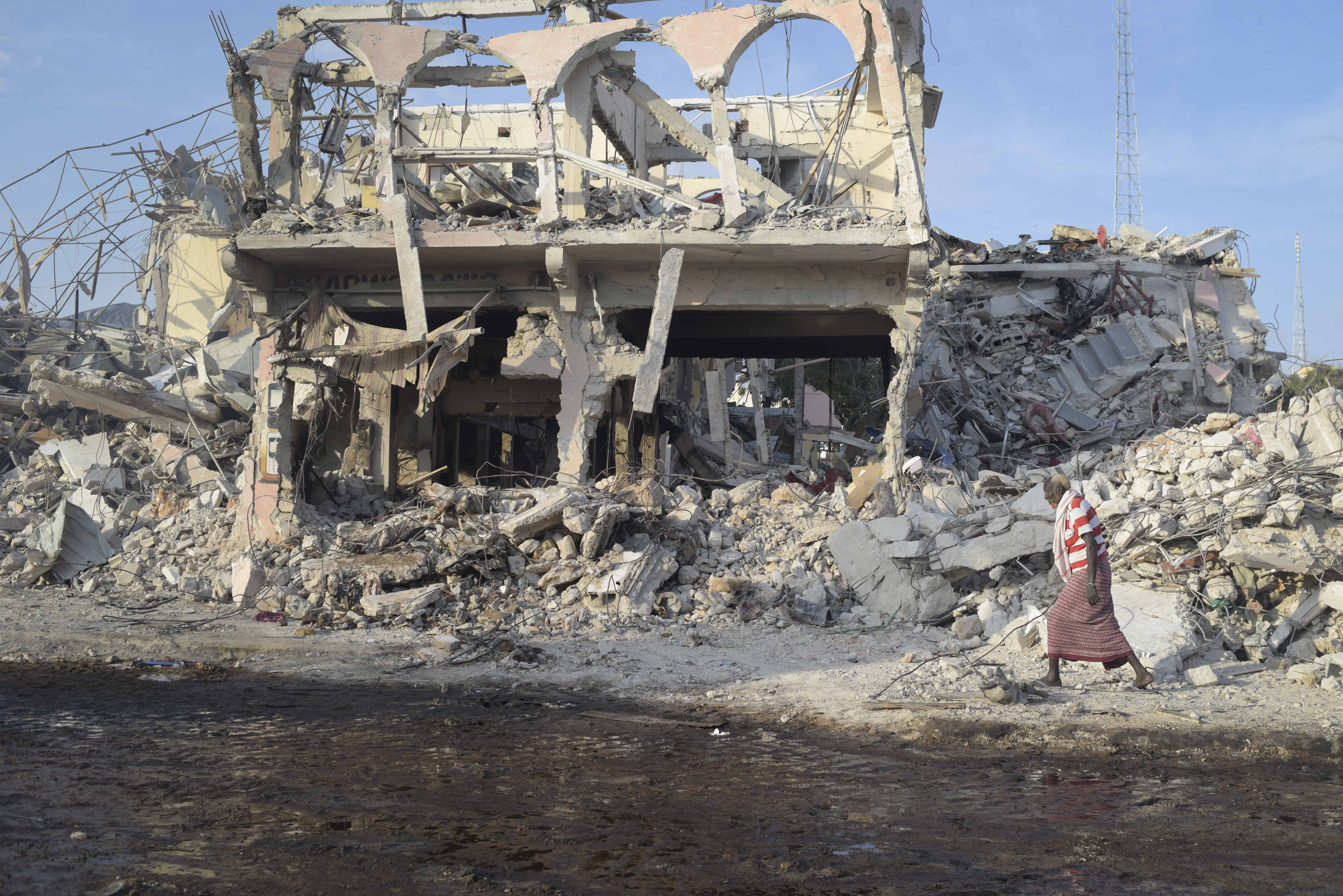
- Safari Hotel, Mogadishu, Somalia
- Location: 2°1′57″N 45°18′16″E; Mogadishu, Somalia
- Date: 14 October 2017 (UTC+03:00)
- Attack type: Truck bombing
- Deaths: 587
- Injuries: 316: 500 missing
- Perpetrators: Unknown, Al-Shabaab suspected

On 14 October 2017, two truck bombings took place in Mogadishu, the capital of Somalia, killing at least 587 people and injuring 316 others. Almost all of the casualties were caused by one of the trucks which detonated when the driver, while attempting to escape from security officials, crashed through a barrier and exploded in the Hodan District, destroying a hotel. The intended target of the attack is believed to have been a secure compound housing international agencies and troops. The second blast happened close by, killing two people. A third explosives-laden truck was captured by police.

Though no organisation claimed responsibility, officials stated that a key member of the cell that carried it out had informed them that Islamist group al-Shabaab was responsible.

The attack is the deadliest in Somalia's history, surpassing the 2011 Mogadishu bombing that killed 100 people. It is the second deadliest terrorist attack in African history, behind the 2008 Christmas massacres, and the continent's deadliest bombing. In response to the bombings, Somali president Mohamed Abdullahi Mohamed declared three days of mourning.

== Background ==
During the summer of 2011, the East African region faced a drought and shortage of food supplies, particularly in the Somali region, forcing tens of thousands of people to cross the borders into Ethiopia and Kenya for refuge. Al-Shabaab, a jihadist fundamentalist group designated as a terrorist organization by several countries, threatened to expel the aid groups working in the area before the African Union's AMISOM troops took action to force the al-Shabaab fighters out of the region.

In July 2010, al-Shabaab claimed responsibility for a bombing in Kampala, Uganda in retaliation for Uganda's support for, and presence in, AMISOM.

In 2017, Somalia was continuing to suffer its worst drought in 40 years, with climatic catastrophe compounded by war and poor governance. Al-Shabaab banned humanitarian assistance in areas that it controlled, forcing hundreds of thousands of people to choose between starvation or brutal punishment.

The United States maintained a military involvement in Somalia until 1994, when it withdrew. Earlier in 2017, the U.S. had designated Somalia a "zone of active hostilities," allowing for looser rules and oversight concerning the authorization of drone strikes and ground operations, and the deployment of regular American forces to Somalia was again authorized. This saw the number of American ground forces in Somalia increase from about 50 in 2016 to 400 in 2017.

The bombings occurred amidst deep public discontent and political divisions between federal and regional leaders.

== Attacks ==
On 14 October 2017, a large truck filled with explosives was detonated at a busy crossroads near the Safari Hotel in the Hodan District, at least a kilometre from the Medina Gate. The effect of the bombing was compounded by a fuel tanker parked nearby that caused a massive fireball. Sources close to the government said that the truck contained 350 kg of homemade and military-grade explosives. The truck had been briefly detained at a checkpoint, but was allowed to proceed after local authorities vouched for it. It was then stopped by security officials while stuck in a traffic jam. When it was about to be searched, the driver accelerated and crashed through a barrier, and the truck exploded. The Safari Hotel collapsed, trapping many under its rubble, and the Qatari embassy was severely damaged.

According to a Somali intelligence official investigating the attack, the truck was overloaded and covered with a tarpaulin. Dust on the truck aroused the suspicion of soldiers at a checkpoint just outside Mogadishu. The soldiers ordered the driver to park and exit the vehicle, and the assailant called a well-known man who vouched for the truck. After passing the checkpoint, the truck sped through another checkpoint where soldiers fired upon it and flattened one of its tires. The driver parked on a busy street and detonated the explosives. A senior police investigator stated that the truck was packed with two tonnes of explosives.

A Toyota Noah minivan loaded with explosives was also intercepted and stopped, but it later detonated without casualties.

Officials said that the target of the attacks was the heavily guarded Mogadishu airport compound, where the United Nations, most embassies and the headquarters of the 22,000-strong AMISOM are based. The minivan was to blast open the Medina Gate entrance to the compound to allow the truck with more explosives to enter and detonate. The possible complicity of personnel manning vehicle checkpoints was under investigation after claims that the first truck was stopped at two checkpoints en route to Mogadishu without any cargo inspection.

A second bombing occurred about 30 minutes later, less than 300 metres away, killing two people in the Medina district.

== Victims ==
As of 4 March 2018, at least 587 people had been confirmed killed. The explosion took place on one of the busiest streets in Mogadishu. Victims included senior civil servants, five paramedic volunteers, a journalist, an American-Somali man, a medical student and 15 children. The full death total may never be known with certainty, as the remains of many people would not be found because of the effects of the intense heat (which could be felt 100 metres away from the scene) and others were buried quickly by relatives following Islamic custom. Approximately 160 bodies that could not be recognised were buried by the government the day after the bombing. Over a hundred injured were taken to the Madina hospital, one of six overcrowded nearby hospitals.

== Perpetrators ==
While no group has admitted responsibility, officials believe that the attack was perpetrated by a cell of the group al-Shabaab, following statements made by a key member, a veteran militant who had taken part in previous attacks in Mogadishu. Investigators believed that the attack may have been motivated by a desire for revenge for the botched U.S.-led raid on his hometown in August. He was arrested while driving a second explosives-packed vehicle into the city on the day of the explosion. An official said that the man had confessed and was proud of what he had done for the cause of jihad. Another official said that the bombs were hidden under rice, sugar and other goods in the truck. The driver was detained but a local businessman and tribal leader vouched for the truck. The official stated that investigators were determining whether the attackers were helped from within the security forces. A Somali intelligence official stated that the man who had vouched for the truck was arrested.

In February 2018, a military court in Mogadishu sentenced two people to death for their role in the bombings. According to the court, Hassan Aden Isak was driving a truck intended to be used in a second bombing. Ibrahim Hassan Absuge was sentenced in absentia for the bombings as well, and is also accused of masterminding the November 2016 Mogadishu car bombing that killed 20 people. And on 14 October 2018, the first anniversary of the bombings, Hassan Aden Isak was executed publicly by firing squad.

== Reactions ==
=== Domestic ===
Somali president Mohamed Abdullahi Mohamed declared three days of national mourning. He and hundreds of other Somali citizens donated blood. "Today's horrific attack proves our enemy would stop (at) nothing to cause our people pain and suffering. Let's unite against terror", he said on Twitter, "Time to unite and pray together. Terror won't win."

=== International ===
The United States Department of State expressed condolences to victims and wished a quick recovery for the injured. It called the attack "senseless and cowardly" and said it would stand with Somalia against extremism.

== See also ==
- Mogadishu bombing (disambiguation), a list
- 2017 timeline of the Somali Civil War
