= Sahafi Hotel attacks =

Terrorist incideents in Mogadishu, Somalia on 1 November 2015

The Sahafi Hotel in Mogadishu, Somalia was attacked by al-Shabaab bombers and gunmen on 1 November 2015 and 9 November 2018.

== 2015 attack ==
At dawn on 1 November 2015, a suicide car bombing occurred at the Sahafi Hotel in Mogadishu, Somalia, after which gunmen entered it. First responders arrived and were targeted with two more bombs. The attackers killed at least 15 people, including Abdikarim Yusuf Adam, a former commander of the Somali National Army, the owner of the hotel, a freelance journalist and a member of parliament. Jihadist group al-Shabaab claimed responsibility for the attack.

== 2018 attack ==
On 9 November 2018, a triple car bombing occurred outside the Sahafi Hotel, killing 52 people, including the owner, who was the son of the owner who was killed in the 2015 attack. About 100 others were injured. Five attackers wearing police uniforms were shot dead by police as they tried to enter the hotel. Al-Shabaab claimed responsibility for the attack.
