= April 2022 Mogadishu bombing =

Jihadist suicide bombing in Somalia

- Part of the Somali Civil War
- Attack location
- Location: Mogadishu, Somalia
- Date: April 22, 2022
- Target: Government of Somalia
- Attack type: Mass murder, Suicide bombing
- Weapon: explosive belt
- Deaths: 6
- Injuries: 7
- Perpetrator: Al-Shabaab

On 22 April 2022, at least six people were killed and seven injured in a suicide bombing at a restaurant in Mogadishu, Somalia. The Pescatore Seafood Restaurant had recently opened in the seaside area of Lido Beach. The explosion was detonated by an Al-Shabaab suicide bomber who had been denied access inside the restaurant, where the Somali Police Commissioner and several lawmakers gathered to have an Iftar meal to break the Ramadan fast. None of the legislators were harmed in the explosion, but some of the security personnel were among those killed in the blast. Local police did not specify how many, but did say those killed were mostly civilians.

== See also ==
- 2022 timeline of the Somali Civil War
- January 2016 Mogadishu attack, another attack in Lido Beach
- 2023 Mogadishu hotel attack, another attack in Lido Beach
