= 28 October 2017 Mogadishu attacks =

Terrorist incident in Somalia

- Location: Mogadishu, Somalia
- Date: 28 October 2017
- Attack type: Suicide bombing Truck bombing
- Deaths: 25
- Injuries: 30

A suicide truck bombing occurred on 28 October 2017 in Mogadishu, Somalia. Later that day there were two more explosions, one from a suicide bomber's explosive belt. These bombings killed at least 25 people and injured 30.

The suicide truck bomb was rammed into Nasahablod Two hotel in Mogadishu. Five armed militants subsequently stormed the building afterwards. A siege ensued and three attackers were killed and the other two arrested.

The Islamic militant group Al-Shabaab claimed responsibility for the attack, which occurred two weeks after they suspected to perpetrated the 14 October 2017 Mogadishu bombings.
