= 2011 Mogadishu bombing =

2011 truck bombing in Somalia

Coordinates: 2°2′0″N 45°21′0″E

- Part of Somali Civil War (2009–present)
- Location: Mogadishu, Somalia
- Date: 4 October 2011 (UTC+03:00)
- Target: TFG ministries
- Attack type: Suicide bombing, car bombing, terrorism, mass murder, murder-suicide
- Deaths: 100
- Injuries: 110+
- Perpetrator: Al-Shabaab

The 2011 Mogadishu bombing occurred on 4 October 2011, when a suicide bomber drove a truck into the gate of the Transitional Federal Government's ministerial complex in Mogadishu, Somalia. The resulting explosion killed 100 people and injured over 110 others. Al-Shabaab, an Islamist group, claimed responsibility for the attack. The attack is reported to be the largest since Al-Shabaab launched an insurgency in Somalia in early 2007. It also follows the withdrawal of Al-Shabaab's forces from the area in August after an AMISOM intervention to bring aid to the country during a season of drought.

== Background ==
During the summer of 2011, the East African region faced a drought and shortage of food supplies, particularly in the Somali region, forcing tens of thousands of people to cross the borders into Ethiopia and Kenya for refuge. Al-Shabaab threatened to expel the aid groups working in the area before the African Union's AMISOM troops took action to force the Al-Shabaab fighters out of the region.

In July 2010, Al-Shabaab also claimed responsibility for a bombing in Kampala, Uganda, in retaliation for Uganda's support to, and presence in, AMISOM.

== Attack ==
The attack took place at a security checkpoint leading to the complex of ministries where the Ministry of Education's building is on the K4 (Kilometre Four) district of Mogadishu. Some eyewitnesses said the noise from the explosion was loud enough to be heard several miles from the scene of the attack. According to several reports the attack was aimed at 150 young Somalis who were to be flown to Sudan to be trained as spies, but instead resulted in the death of mostly students and parents awaiting news about scholarships to Sudan and Turkey from the Ministry of Higher Education. Turkey, which also increased its involvement in Somalia with a pledge to re-open its embassy in Mogadishu, released a statement clarifying the events that took place. The Turkish Foreign Ministry reported that the students were queuing outside the Ministry of Higher Education when the blast occurred, waiting for the results of scholarships offered by Turkey. Other reports said that students were taking an exam at the time of the blast. Although many of the casualties were students and parents, some of the other victims were non-student civilians. Suldan Sarah, the communications director for President Sharif Sheikh Ahmed, said that "security services are working around the clock, and are working within their capabilities, and as such have foiled a number of attempts over the past month [of other attacks]." AMISOM and TFG (Transitional Federal Government) forces cordoned off the area soon after the blast.

On the same day, Al-Shabaab simultaneously launched attacks in the south and west of Somalia.

== Responsibility ==
Al-Shabaab claimed responsibility for the attack, saying: "One of our mujahideen made the sacrifice to kill TFG [Transitional Federal Government] officials, the African Union troops and other informers who were in the compound." A spokesman for the group, Ali Mohamud Rage, later said that: "Somalis, we warn you: keep away from government buildings and the bases of their soldiers, more serious blasts are coming."

== Reactions ==
Domestic

- Somalia President Sharif Sheikh Ahmed said in a statement: "I am extremely shocked and saddened by this cruel and inhumane act of violence against the most vulnerable in our society". His communications director, Suldan Sarah, said: "To do a cowardly act like that does not mean you are a force to be reckoned with. It just means you can commit a mass murder using a suicide bomber. This is not the sign of strength, but rather a cowardly act."

International

- UN – Secretary-General Ban Ki-moon's spokesman Martin Nesirky said: "it is incomprehensible that innocents are being senselessly targeted. The secretary-general is appalled by the vicious suicide bomb attack targeting government offices and ministries in Mogadishu today."
- Turkey – Prime Minister Recep Tayyip Erdoğan called Ahmed and offered to bring the wounded from the bombing to Turkey for medical treatment.
- United States – White House's spokesman Jay Carney condemned the attacks saying: "Those killed in the 'despicable and cowardly act' included students taking an exam in hopes of getting scholarships to study abroad."

== See also ==
- Mogadishu bombing (disambiguation)
- Somali Civil War
