= February 2017 Mogadishu bombing =

Terrorist incident in Somalia

- Part of the Somali Civil War (2009–present)
- Mogadishu (Somalia)
- Location: Mogadishu, Somalia
- Date: 19 February 2017
- Attack type: Car bombing
- Weapon: Car bomb
- Deaths: 39 (+1 suicide bomber)
- Injuries: 50

On 19 February 2017, at least 39 people were killed after a car bomb exploded near Wadajir market in Madina district, Mogadishu, Somalia. More than 50 others were wounded. No group claimed responsibility; Somali President Mohamed Abdullahi Mohamed offered a $100,000 reward for information leading to the arrest of those who planned the blast.

== Reactions ==
- United Nations - Members of the UN Security Council expressed their deep sympathy and condolences to the families of the victims, as well as to the Somali people and government. The council also wished a speedy recovery to those injured.
