= February 2016 Mogadishu attack =

Suicide bombing in Somalia

- Part of Somali Civil War (2009–present)
- Location: Mogadishu, Somalia
- Date: 26 February 2016; 7:45pm (UTC+03:00)
- Attack type: Suicide truck bombing, shooting
- Weapons: Truck bomb, guns
- Deaths: 14 (+5 attackers)
- Injuries: 16
- Perpetrator: Al-Shabaab

A suicide bomber detonated a truck at a checkpoint outside the Somali Youth League hotel at 7:45pm on 26 February 2016 in Mogadishu, Somalia. It was followed by his accomplices clashing with the hotel security guards. The police said they ended the attack by killing the four insurgent gunmen. Five militants, including the suicide bomber, as well as 14 civilians were killed. Al-Shabaab claimed responsibility. Sixteen other people were injured.

Five people were killed in a suicide bombing at the same hotel in January 2015.
