= January 2016 Mogadishu attack =

Terrorist incident in Somalia

- Part of Somali Civil War (2009–present)
- Location: Mogadishu, Somalia
- Date: 21 January 2016 (UTC+03:00)
- Attack type: Suicide car bombing Mass shooting
- Weapons: Car bomb, AK-47 rifles
- Deaths: About 20
- Injuries: 17
- Perpetrator: Al-Shabaab

An attack occurred on 21 January 2016 in Mogadishu, Somalia. Al-Shabaab drove a suicide car bomb at the gate of the Beach View Café, a seafood restaurant overlooking the city's Lido Beach. Another blast struck about an hour later as government soldiers laid siege to the restaurant. After the blasts, militants entered the building, some of them by boat, and attacked civilians within. About 20 people were killed and 17 others wounded. Several perpetrators were also killed and one was arrested.

Al-Qaeda linked group Al-Shabaab claimed responsibility, saying the attackers used AK-47s and suicide vests. The attack occurred six days after al-Shabaab attacked a Kenyan-run AMISOM base in El Adde, Gedo.

== See also ==
- 2016 timeline of the Somali Civil War
- Pescatore Seafood Restaurant bombing, another attack in Lido Beach
- 2023 Mogadishu hotel attack, another attack in Lido Beach
