= Outline of Somalia =

Country in the Horn of Africa

The Flag of Somalia

The Coat of arms of Somalia

The location of Somalia

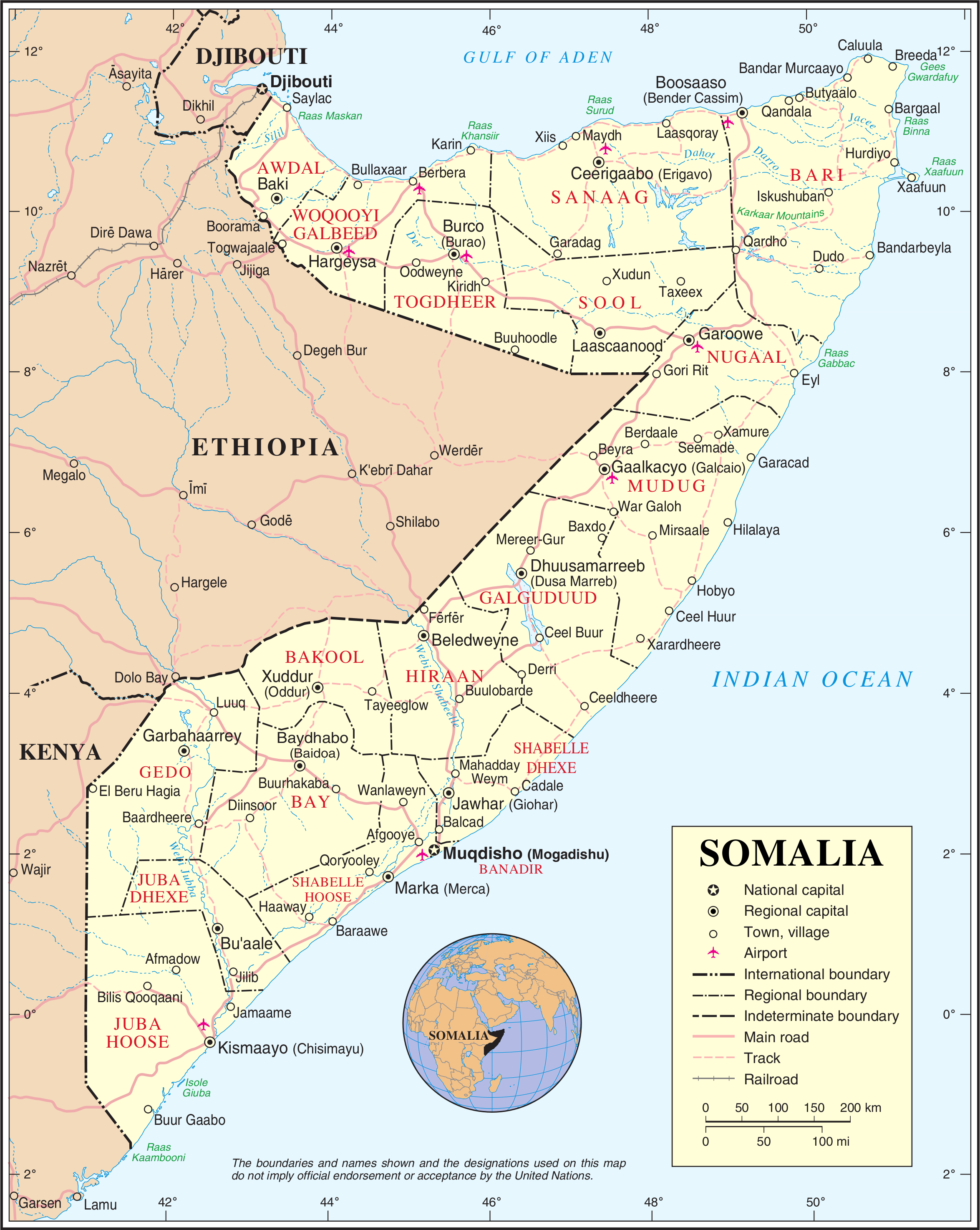
An enlargeable map of Somalia

The following outline is provided as an overview of and topical guide to Somalia:

Somalia – country located in the Horn of Africa. It is bordered by Ethiopia to the west, Djibouti to the northwest, the Gulf of Aden to the north, the Guardafui Channel and Somali Sea to the east, and Kenya to the southwest. Somalia has the longest coastline on the mainland, and its terrain consists mainly of plateaus, plains and highlands. Hot conditions prevail year-round, along with periodic monsoon winds and irregular rainfall.

== General reference ==
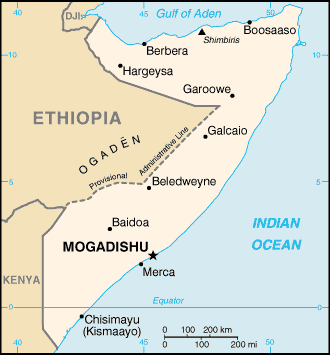
An enlargeable basic map of Somalia

- Pronunciation: /soʊˈmɑːliə/ soh-MAH-lee-ə
- Common English country name: Somalia
- Official English country name: The Federal Republic of Somalia
- Common endonym(s):
- Official endonym(s):
- Adjectival(s): Somali
- Demonym(s): Somali
- ISO country codes: SO, SOM, 706
- ISO region codes: See ISO 3166-2:SO
- Internet country code top-level domain: .so

== Geography of Somalia ==
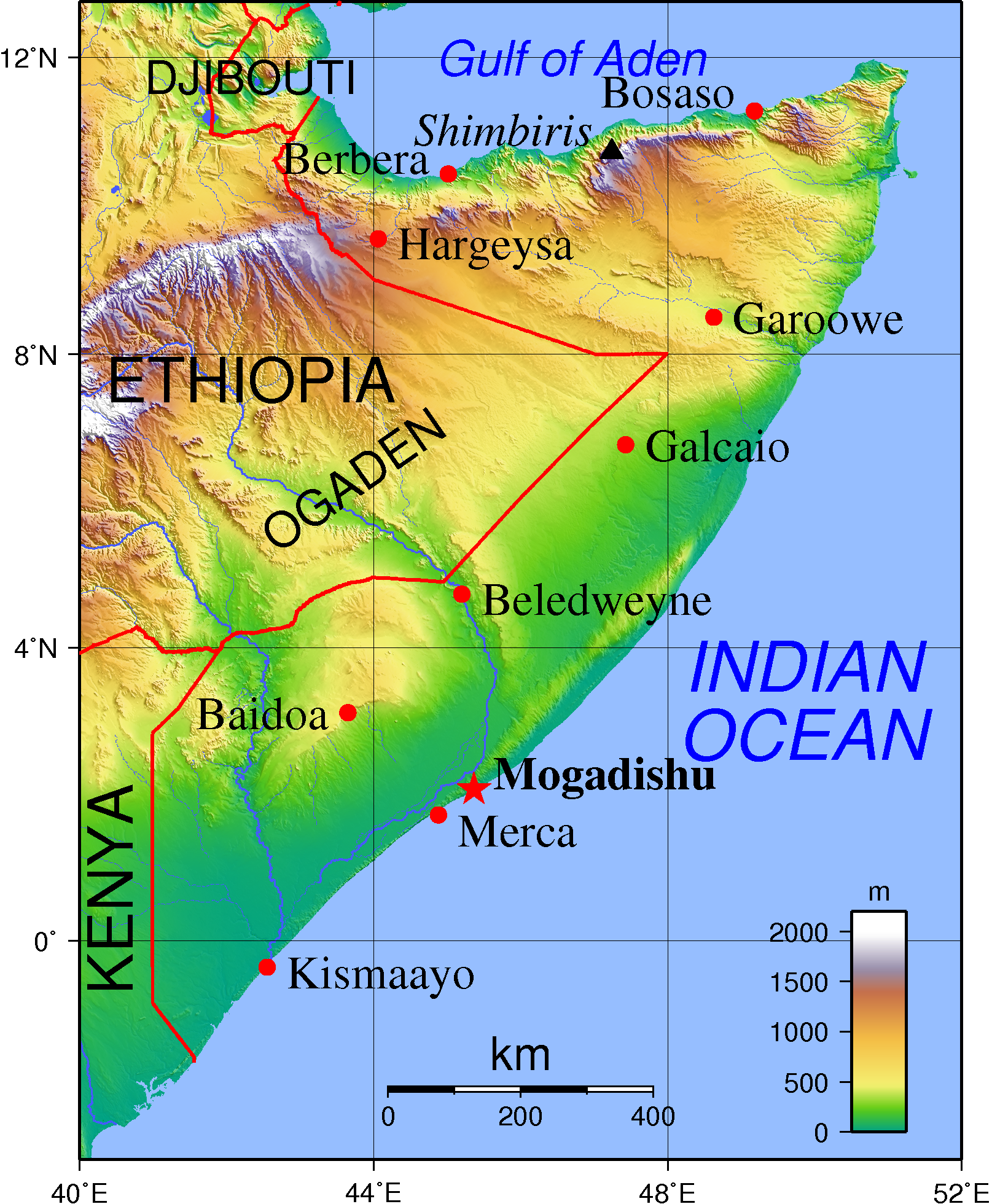
An enlargeable topographic map of Somalia

- Somalia is: a country
- Location:
  - Eastern Hemisphere, on the Equator
  - Africa
    - East Africa
      - Horn of Africa
  - Time zone: East Africa Time (UTC+03)
  - Extreme points of Somalia
    - High: Shimbiris 2,450 m (8,038 ft)
    - Low: Indian Ocean 0 m
  - Land boundaries: 2,340 km

Djibouti 58 km
Ethiopia 1,600 km
Kenya 682 km

- Coastline: 3,025 km

- Population of Somalia: 19,655,000 - 65th most populous country
- Area of Somalia: 637,661 km^{2}
- Atlas of Somalia

=== Environment of Somalia ===
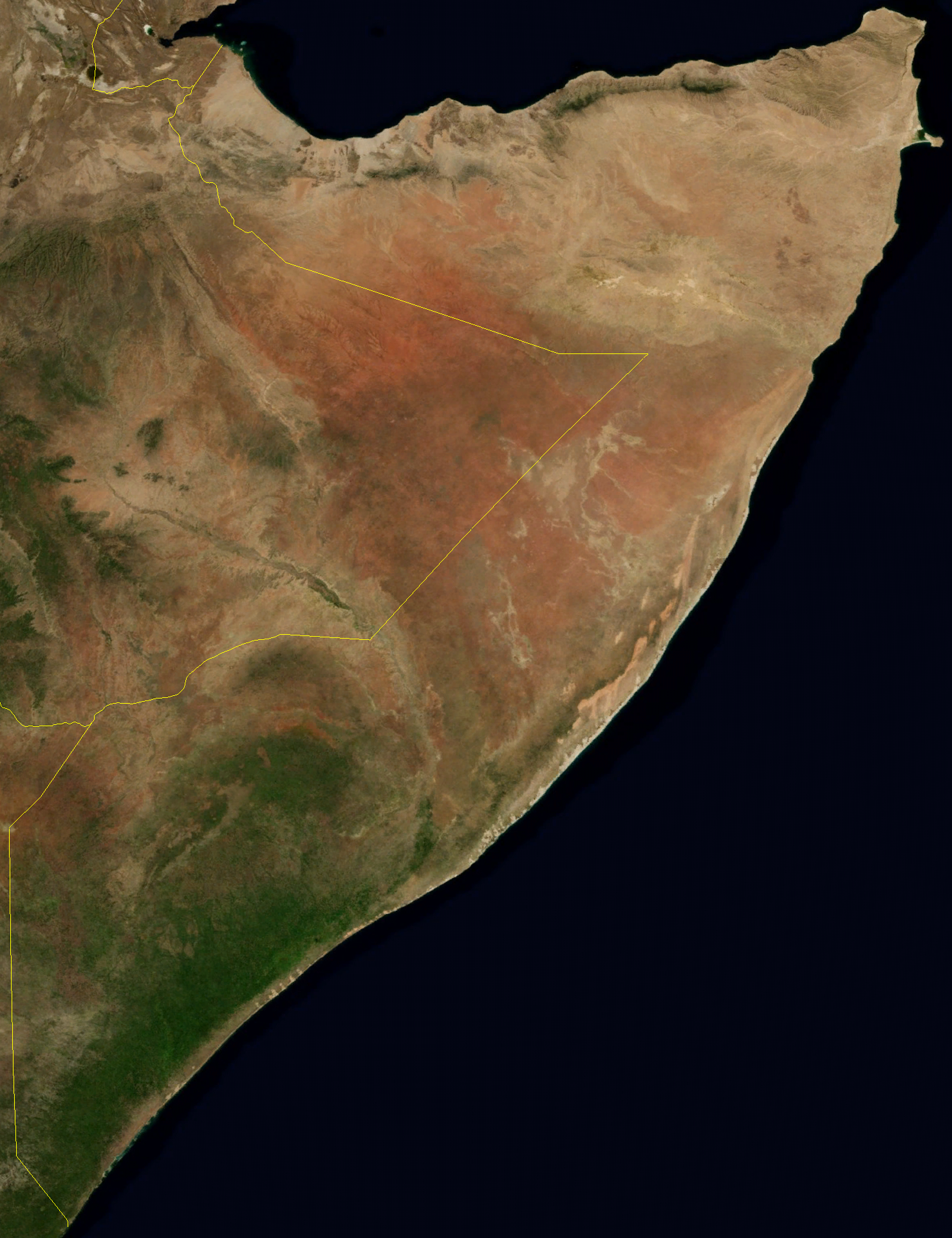
An enlargeable satellite image of Somalia

- Climate of Somalia
- Environmental issues in Somalia
- Ecoregions in Somalia
- Protected areas of Somalia
  - National parks of Somalia
- Wildlife of Somalia
  - Flora of Somalia
  - Fauna of Somalia
    - Birds of Somalia
    - Mammals of Somalia

==== Natural geographic features of Somalia ====
- Glaciers in Somalia: none
- Rivers of Somalia

=== Regions of Somalia ===
States and regions of Somalia

==== Ecoregions of Somalia ====
List of ecoregions in Somalia

- Ecoregions in Somalia

==== Administrative divisions of Somalia ====
Map of Somalia's states and regions

Administrative divisions of Somalia

- Regions of Somalia
  - Districts of Somalia
    - Cities in Somalia

Regions of Somalia

- Bakool
- Banaadir
- Bari
- Bay
- Galguduud
- Gedo
- Hiiraan
- Jubbada Dhexe
- Jubbada Hoose
- Mudug
- Nugaal
- Shabeellaha Dhexe
- Shabeellaha Hoose

===== Claimed territory =====
- Awdal
- Sanaag
- Sool
- Togdheer
- Woqooyi Galbeed

== Government and politics of Somalia ==
Politics of Somalia

- Form of government:
- Capital of Somalia: Mogadishu
- History of the Transitional Federal Government of the Republic of Somalia
- History of Somalia (1991-2006)
- Elections in Somalia
- Political parties in Somalia

=== Branches of the government of Somalia ===
Government of Somalia

==== Executive branch of the government of Somalia ====
- Head of state: President of Somalia, Hassan Sheikh Mohamud
- Head of government: Prime Minister of Somalia, Hamza Abdi Barre
- Cabinet of Somalia

==== Legislative branch of the government of Somalia ====
- Parliament of Somalia: Federal Parliament (unicameral)

==== Judicial branch of the government of Somalia ====
Judiciary of Somalia

=== Foreign relations of Somalia ===
Foreign relations of Somalia

- Diplomatic missions in Somalia
- Diplomatic missions of Somalia

==== International organization membership ====
The Republic of Somalia is a member of:

- African, Caribbean, and Pacific Group of States (ACP)
- African Development Bank Group (AfDB)
- African Union (AU)
- Arab Fund for Economic and Social Development (AFESD)
- Arab Monetary Fund (AMF)
- Council of Arab Economic Unity (CAEU)
- Food and Agriculture Organization (FAO)
- Group of 77 (G77)
- Inter-Governmental Authority on Development (IGAD)
- International Bank for Reconstruction and Development (IBRD)
- International Civil Aviation Organization (ICAO)
- International Criminal Police Organization (Interpol)
- International Development Association (IDA)
- International Federation of Red Cross and Red Crescent Societies (IFRCS)
- International Finance Corporation (IFC)
- International Fund for Agricultural Development (IFAD)
- International Labour Organization (ILO)
- International Maritime Organization (IMO)
- International Monetary Fund (IMF)
- International Olympic Committee (IOC)
- International Organization for Migration (IOM)
- International Red Cross and Red Crescent Movement (ICRM)
- International Telecommunication Union (ITU)
- International Telecommunications Satellite Organization (ITSO)
- Inter-Parliamentary Union (IPU)
- Islamic Development Bank (IDB)
- League of Arab States (LAS)
- Nonaligned Movement (NAM)
- Organisation of Islamic Cooperation (OIC)
- United Nations (UN)
- United Nations Conference on Trade and Development (UNCTAD)
- United Nations Educational, Scientific, and Cultural Organization (UNESCO)
- United Nations High Commissioner for Refugees (UNHCR)
- United Nations Industrial Development Organization (UNIDO)
- Universal Postal Union (UPU)
- World Federation of Trade Unions (WFTU)
- World Health Organization (WHO)
- World Intellectual Property Organization (WIPO)
- World Meteorological Organization (WMO)

Somalia is one of only 7 U.N member countries, which are not a member state of the Organisation for the Prohibition of Chemical Weapons.

=== Law and order in Somalia ===
Judiciary of Somalia

- Alcohol in Somalia
- Cannabis in Somalia
- Capital punishment in Somalia
- Constitution of Somalia
- Crime in Somalia
  - Kidnapping and hostage taking in Somalia
  - Piracy in Somalia
  - Terrorism in Somalia
- Human rights in Somalia
  - LGBT rights in Somalia
  - Women in Somalia
  - Freedom of religion in Somalia
- Law enforcement in Somalia
- Marriage in Somalia
  - Polygamy in Somalia
- Xeer

=== Military of Somalia ===
Military of Somalia

- Command
  - Commander-in-chief: President of Somalia
    - Ministry of Defence of Somalia
- Forces
  - Army of Somalia
  - Navy of Somalia
  - Air Force of Somalia
- Military history of Somalia

=== Local government in Somalia ===
Local government in Somalia

== History of Somalia ==
- Economic history of Somalia
- History of the Transitional Federal Government of the Republic of Somalia
- Maritime history of Somalia
- Military history of Somalia
  - Somali Civil War
    - Attempts at reconciliation in Somalia (1991–2004)
    - Factions in the Somali Civil War
    - Timeline of the War in Somalia
      - 2006 timeline of the War in Somalia
      - 2007 timeline of the War in Somalia
      - 2008 timeline of the War in Somalia
      - 2009 timeline of the Somali Civil War
      - 2010 timeline of the Somali Civil War
      - 2011 timeline of the Somali Civil War
      - 2012 timeline of the Somali Civil War
      - 2013 timeline of the Somali Civil War
      - 2014 timeline of the Somali Civil War
      - 2015 timeline of the Somali Civil War
      - 2016 timeline of the Somali Civil War
      - 2017 timeline of the Somali Civil War
      - 2018 timeline of the Somali Civil War
    - Somalia War (2006–2009)
    - Somali Civil War (2009–present)
- Political history of Somalia

== Culture of Somalia ==
- Architecture of Somalia
- Cuisine of Somalia
- Languages of Somalia
- Media in Somalia
- National symbols of Somalia
  - Coat of arms of Somalia
  - Flag of Somalia
  - National anthem of Somalia
- Public holidays in Somalia
- Religion in Somalia
  - Islam in Somalia
  - Christianity in Somalia
    - Roman Catholicism in Somalia

=== Art in Somalia ===
- Somali art
- Cinema of Somalia
  - Somaliwood
- Literature of Somalia
- Music of Somalia

=== Sports in Somalia ===
Sports in Somalia

- Somalia national football team
- Somalia national beach soccer team
- Somalia League
- Somalia Cup
- Somali Football Federation
- Somalia national basketball team
- Somalia at the Olympics

== Economy and infrastructure of Somalia ==
- Economic rank, by nominal GDP (2007): 153rd (one hundred and fifty third)
- Agriculture in Somalia
- Banking in Somalia
  - Central Bank of Somalia
- Communications in Somalia
  - Internet in Somalia
- Companies of Somalia
- Currency of Somalia: Shilling
  - ISO 4217: SOS
- Economic history of Somalia
- Energy in Somalia
- Health care in Somalia
- Mining in Somalia
- Somalia Stock Exchange
- Tourism in Somalia
- Transport in Somalia
  - Airports in Somalia
  - Rail transport in Somalia

== Education in Somalia ==
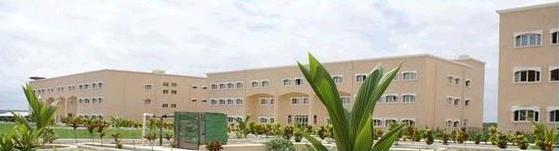

- National Library of Somalia
- Universities in Somalia

== See also ==
- List of international rankings
- Member state of the United Nations
- Outline of Africa
- Outline of geography
