= Djibouti (disambiguation) =

Djibouti is a country in the Horn of Africa.

Djibouti may also refer to:

- Djibouti Region, a regional administrative division of the country
- Djibouti City, capital of the country
- Djibouti (anthem), the national anthem of Djibouti
- The Afar language is the official language of Djibouti
- Djibouti (novel) (2010), novel by Elmore Leonard
- Djibouti (film), a 2021 Indian Malayalam-language film

== See also ==
- Afar (disambiguation)
- Somali (disambiguation)
