= Wildlife of Somalia =

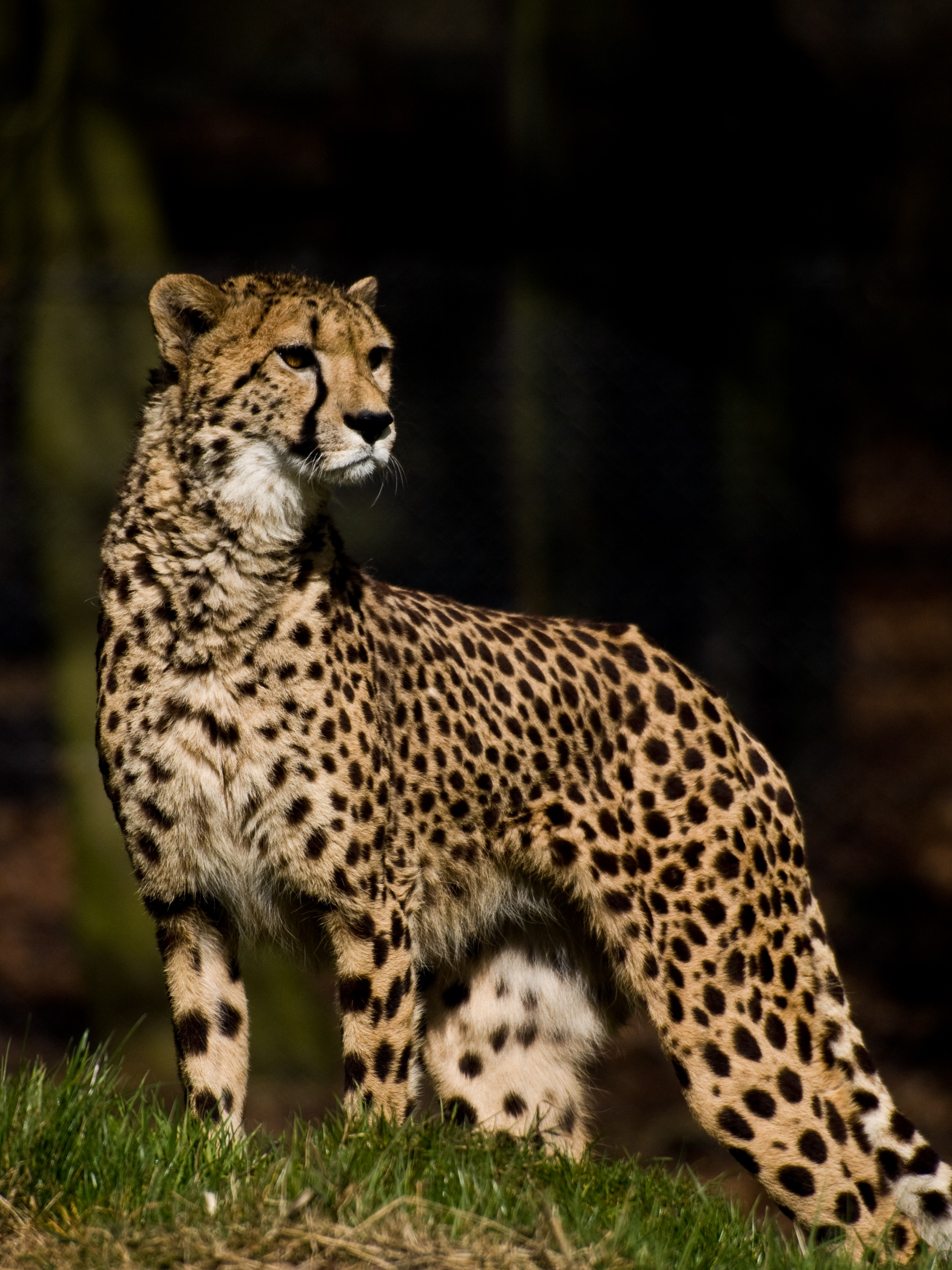
Somali cheetah

The wildlife of Somalia includes the flora and fauna of Somalia, which is extremely diverse due to the country's location between the temperate and the tropical zones. Somalia has a long coastline, bordered by the Indian Ocean in the east and Red Sea in the north. The northwestern and central parts of the country are arid, or very dry. The southern and northeastern regions are semi-arid, receiving slightly more rainfall than the central and northwest regions. The coastal region is more humid due to its proximity to the ocean. Somalia is home to over 727 species of birds and boasts over 177 species of mammals.

The Nile crocodile, the largest crocodilian found in Africa, is very common in southern Somalia. Somalia is home to a diverse variety of flora and fauna, from acacia trees, to birds, large cats, and reptiles large and small.

In some areas, the mountains are covered with shrubs such as pyracantha, jasmine, poinsettia, and a varied assortment of evergreens. Caraway, carcade, cardamom, coriander, incense, myrrh, and red pepper are common.

== Lexicology ==
There are many forms of terminology and ways of describing the subphylums, metonyms and classifications of the various animals living within Somalia. These include, bahal ('creature'), doobjoog ('domestic animal'/'pet'), duurjoog/dugaag ('wild'/'undomesticated animal'), hangaguri ('general animal'), dalanga or its determiner form dalangihi (chordate), naasley ('mammal'), cayayaan ('insect'), beribiyood ('amphibian'), xamaarato ('reptile'), and noole ('organism').

== Fauna ==
=== Mammals ===
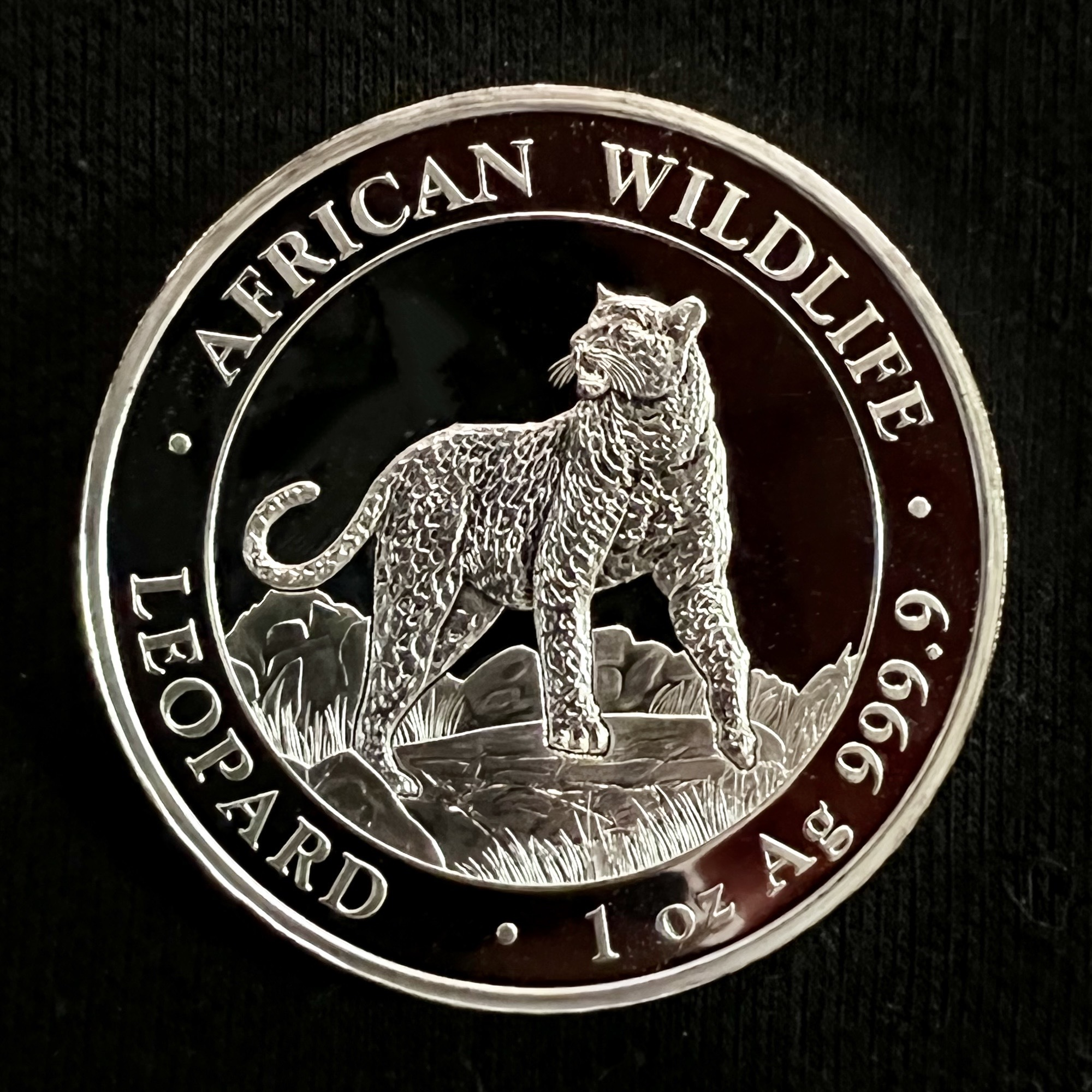
2022 Somali 1 oz silver coin with a leopard on the obverse

Somalia contains a variety of mammals due to its geographical and climatic diversity. Wild animals are found in every region. Among them are the lion, Somali cheetah, reticulated giraffe, hamadryas baboon, civet, serval, African bush elephant, bushpig, Soemmerring's gazelle, antelope, ibex, kudu, dik-dik, oribi, reedbuck, Somali wild ass, Grévy's zebra, and hyena.

Elephants were also found in Somaliland. Since elephants are migratory, they are found in a variety of habitats, such as woodland, savanna, and tropical forests. The yellow-spotted rock hyrax, which is found in savanna and rocky areas, looks much like a large rodent, but is actually related to elephants. The golden mole lives in savanna.

The following mammals are found exclusively in Somalia:

- Berbera gerbil
- Greenwood's shrew
- Brockman's gerbil

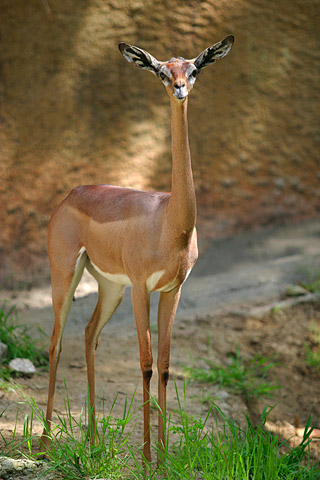
Gerenuk are found in Somalia

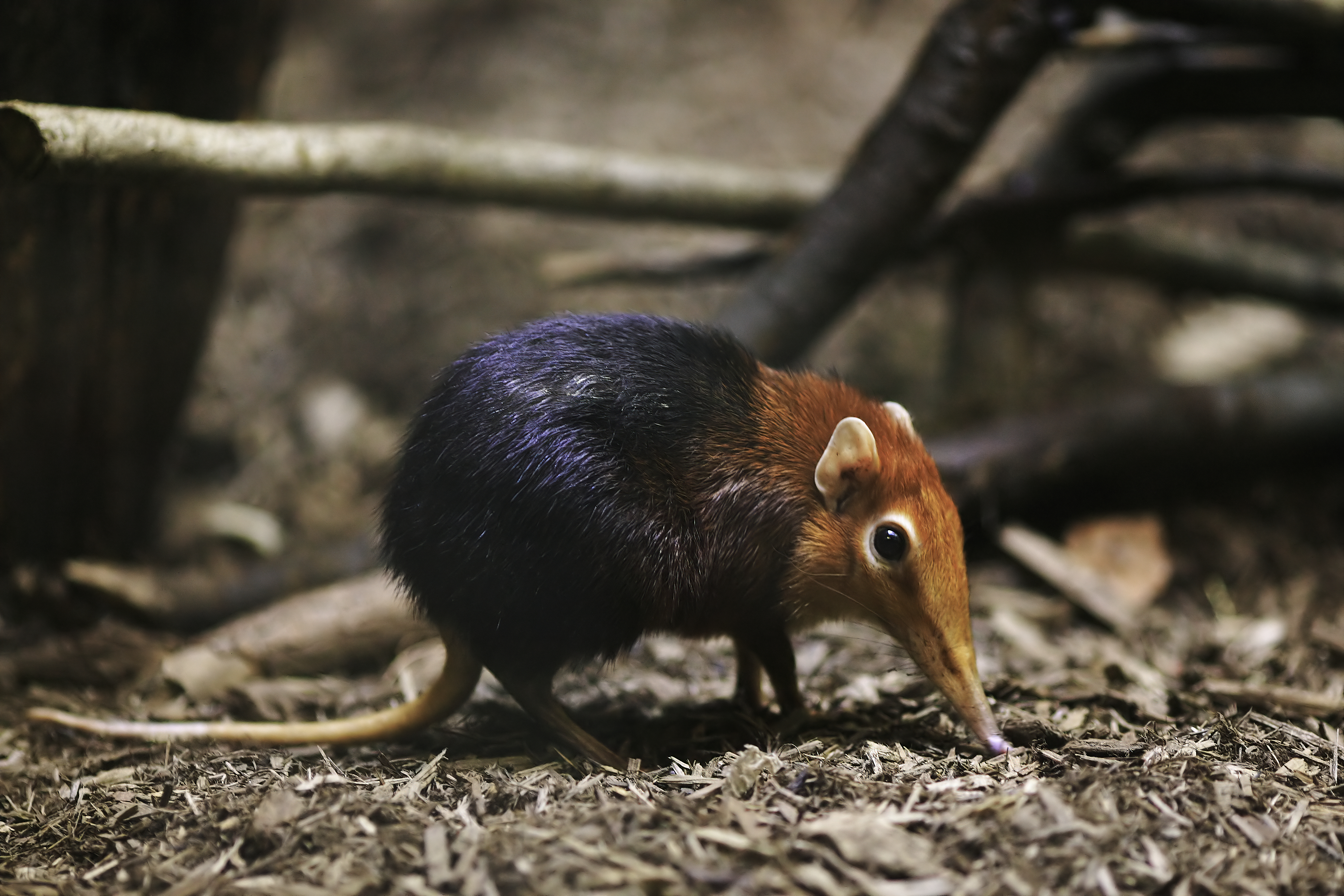
Elephant shrews are found in Somalia

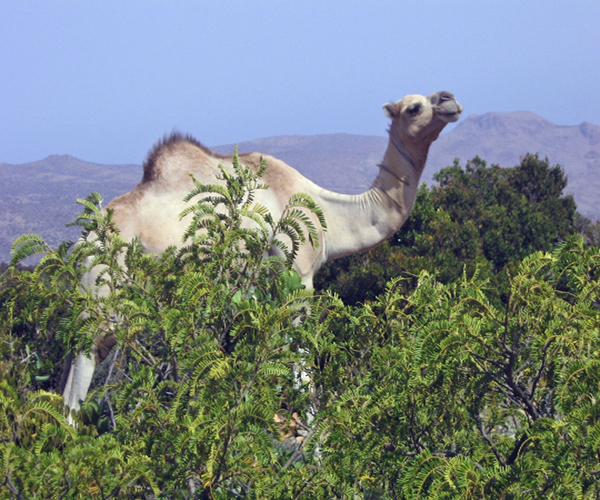
Somalia has the world's largest population of camels

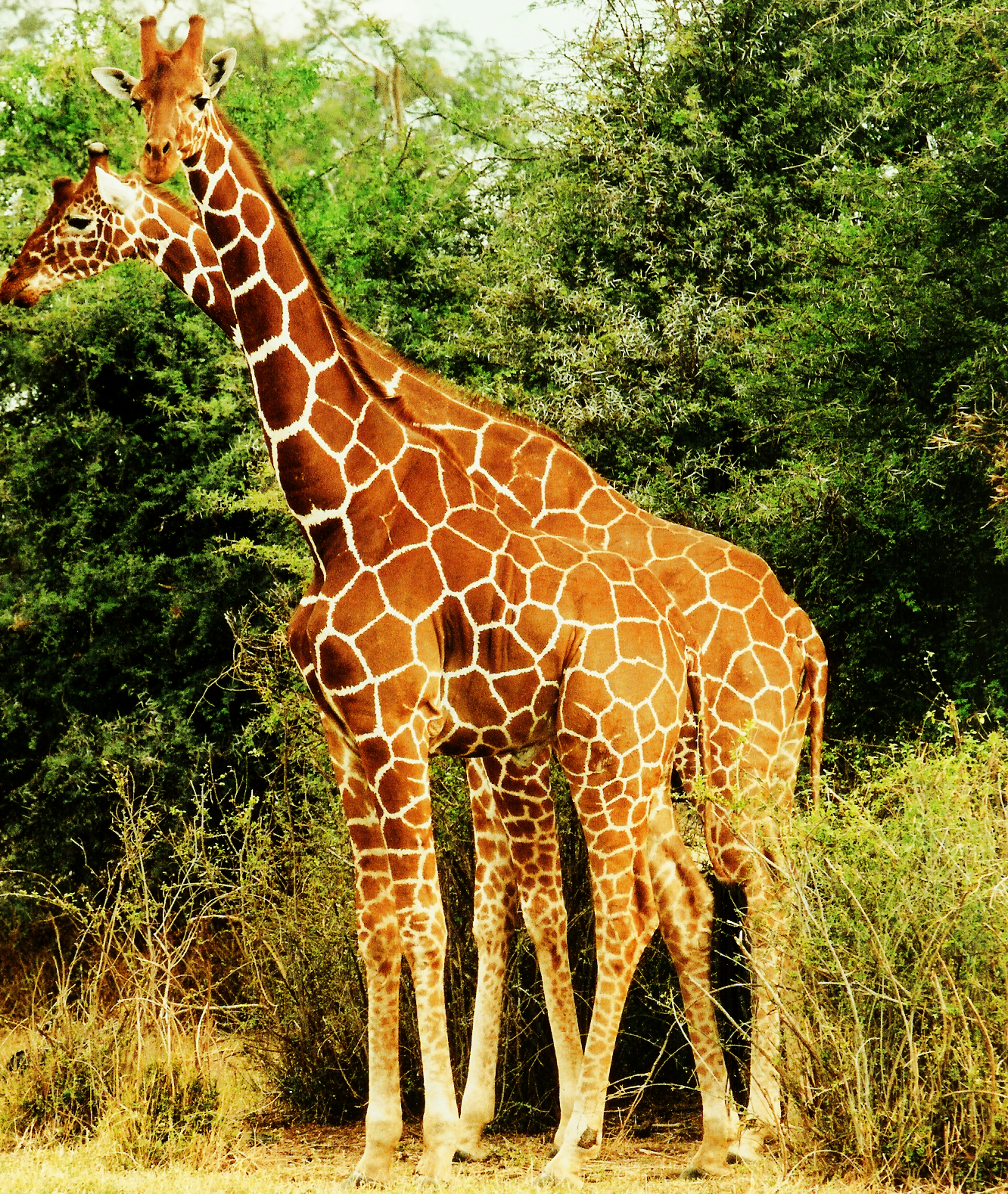
Giraffe

=== Birds ===
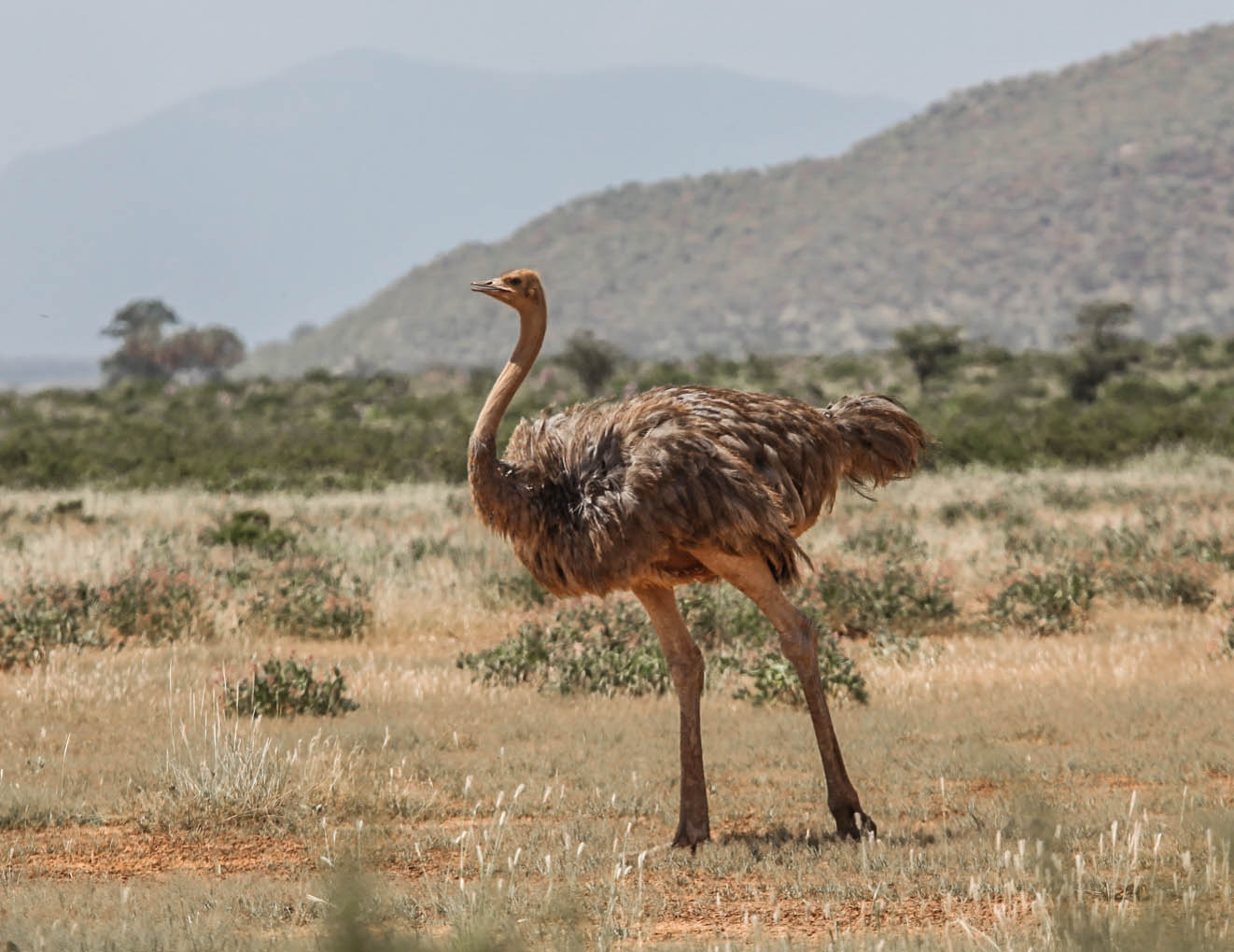
Somali ostrich

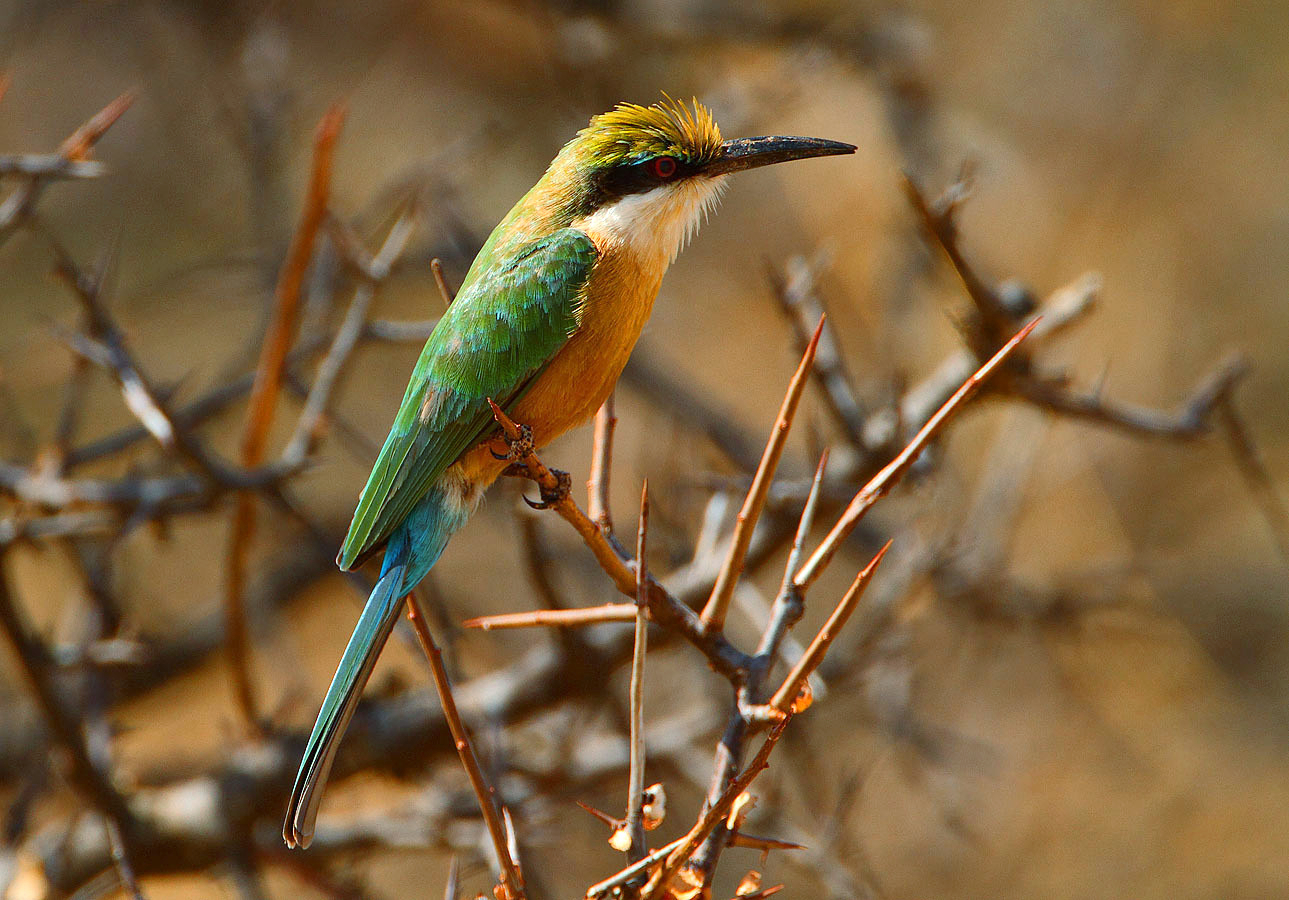
Bee-eater

Somalia is currently home to about 727 species of birds, of which eight are endemic, one has been introduced by humans and one is rare or accidental. Fourteen species are globally threatened. The following species of birds are found exclusively in Somalia:

- Columba oliviae - Somali pigeon
- Alaemon hamertoni - lesser hoopoe-lark
- Mirafra somalica - Somali lark
- Corypha sharpii - Russet lark
- Spizocorys obbiensis - Obbia lark
- Turdus ludoviciae - Somali thrush
- Rhynchostruthus louisae - Somali grosbeak
- Linaria johannis - Warsangli linnet

=== Reptiles ===
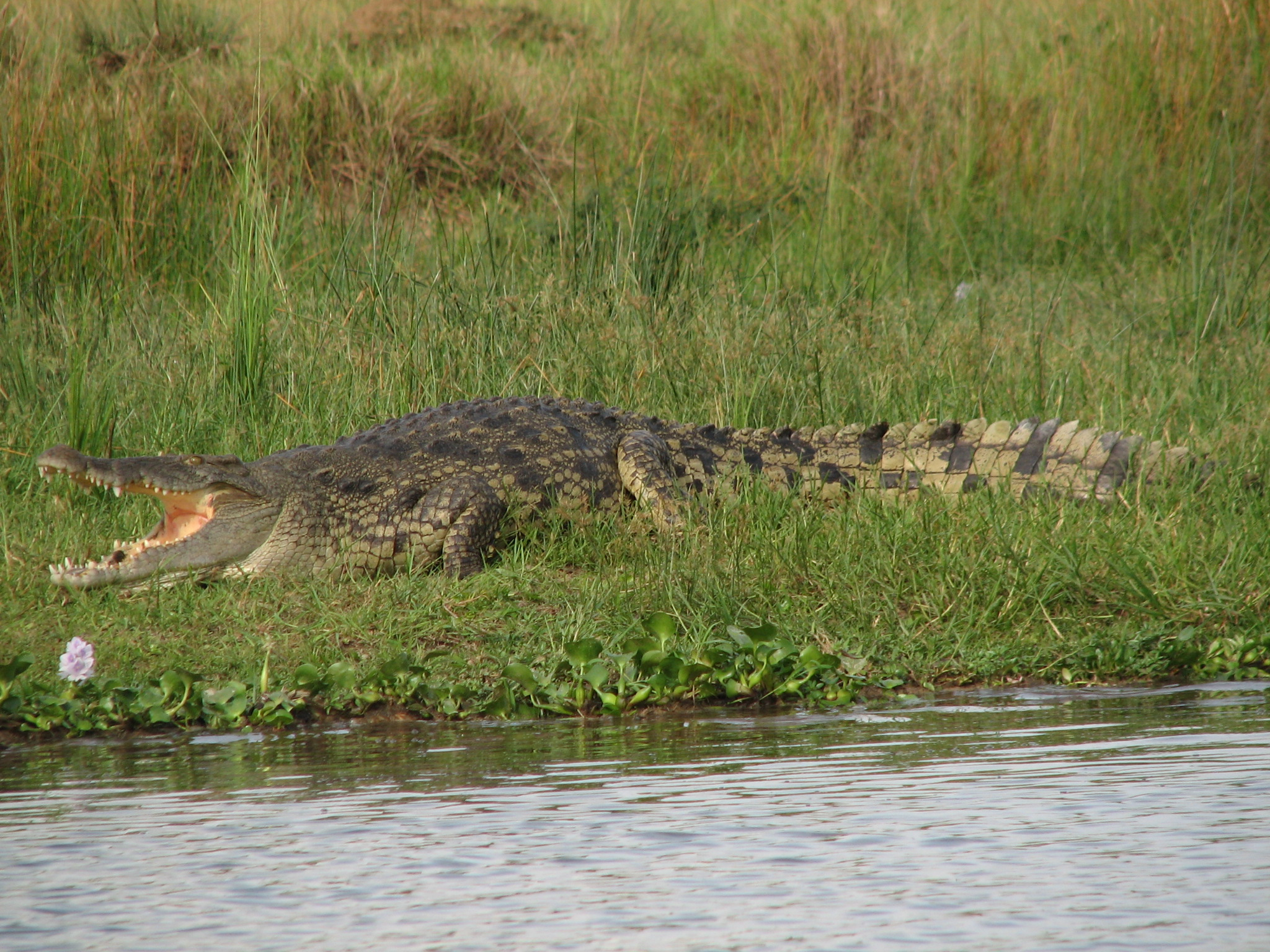
The Nile crocodile is very common in southern Somalia

Somalia has roughly 235 species of reptiles, of which almost half live in its northern areas. The Nile crocodile is very common in southern Somalia, and is the largest crocodilian found in Africa. Adult males can grow to between 3.7 and 4.9 m (12 and 16 ft) long.

Reptiles unique to Somalia include the Hughes' carpet viper, Somali garter snake, Messana's racer, Scortecci's diadem snake, Somali sand boa, angled worm lizard, Macfadyen's mastigure, Somali agama, Granchi's leaf-toed gecko, Somali semaphore gecko, Haacke-Greer's skink, an unnamed colubrid snake (Aprosdoketophis andreonei), and a wall lizard from either the Mesalina or Eremias genera.

=== Fish ===
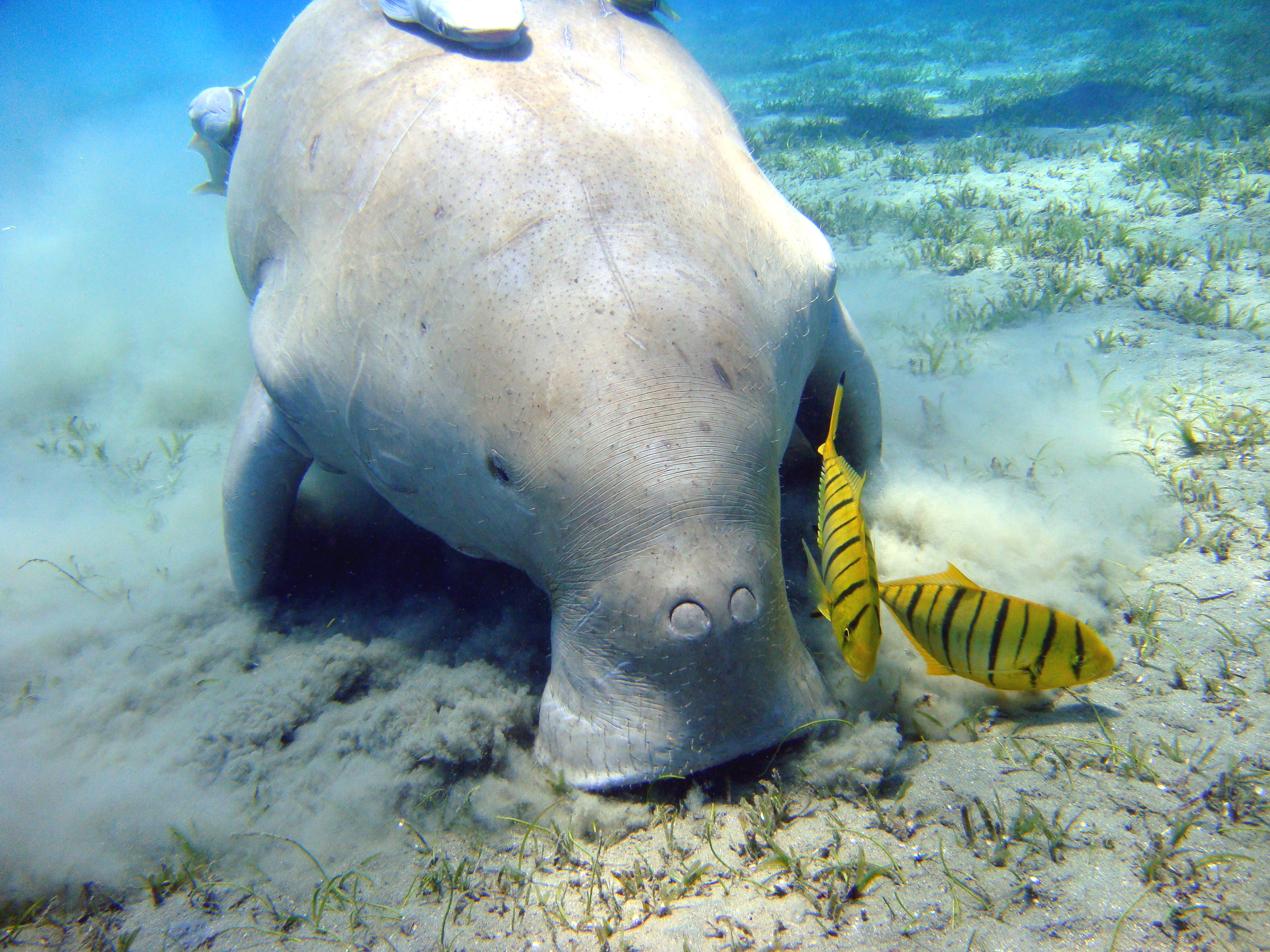
Dugong

With 3300 km of coastline facing the Indian Ocean, Somalia has the longest coastline in continental Africa. Somali waters are prime fishing grounds for migratory fish such as tuna and tuna-like species, and a narrow but productive continental shelf is the home to several demersal fish and crustacean species.

Fish species found exclusively in Somalia include:

- Cirrhitichthys randalli (Somali hawkfish) in the hawkfish family Cirrhitidae
- Symphurus fuscus in the tonguefish family Cynoglossidae
- Parapercis simulata in the sandperch family Pinguipedidae
- Cociella somaliensis in the flathead family Platycephalidae
- Pseudochromis punctatus (blackback dottyback) in the dottyback family Pseudochromidae

== Flora ==
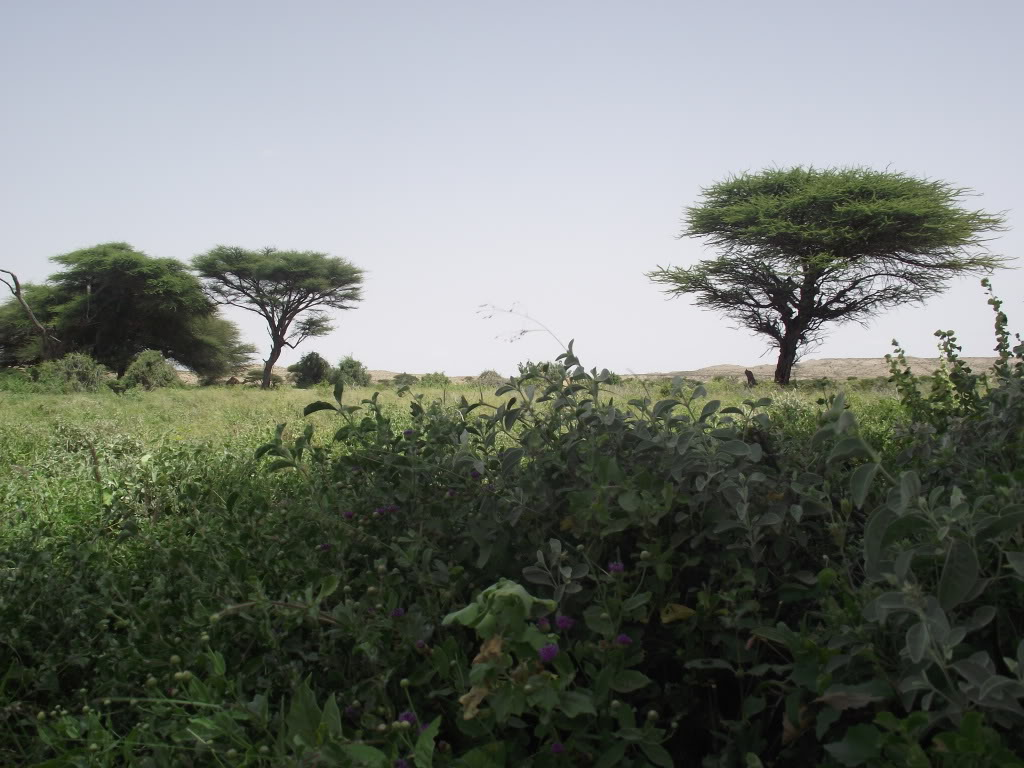
Grassland located in the Nugaal Valley

The highlands, traversing East Africa in an almost continuous line, have to a great extent isolated the flora of Somalia in spite of the general resemblance of its climate and soil to land on the western side of the band of high ground. The greater part of the country is covered either with tall coarse grasses, or more commonly with thick thorn-bush or jungle, among which rise occasional isolated trees. The prevalent bush plants are khansa, acacias, aloes, and, especially, Boswellia and Commiphora, which yield highly fragrant resins and balsams, such as myrrh, frankincense (olibanum) and balm of Gilead.

Among the larger trees are the mountain cedar, reaching to 100 ft.; the gob, which bears edible berries in appearance something like the cherry with the taste of an apple, grows to some 80 ft, and is found fringing the river beds. There are patches of dense reeds, reaching 10 ft high, and thickets of tamarisk along the river beds, and on either side the jungle is high and more luxuriant than on the open plateau. Of herbaceous plants the kissenia, the sole representative of the order Loasaceae, which is common in America but very rare elsewhere, is found in Somalia, which also possesses forms belonging to the eastern Mediterranean flora.

The following vascular plant genera are found exclusively in Somalia:

- Eriostylos 1 sp. Amaranthaceae
- Polyrhabda 1 sp. Amaranthaceae
- Goydera 1 sp. Apocynaceae
- Whitesloanea 1 sp. Apocynaceae
- Puccionia 1 sp. Cleomaceae
- Afrotrichloris 2 spp. Gramineae
- Pseudozoysia 1 sp. Gramineae
- Taeniorhachis 1 sp. Gramineae
- Renschia 1 sp. Labiatae
- Symphyochlamys 1 sp. Malvaceae

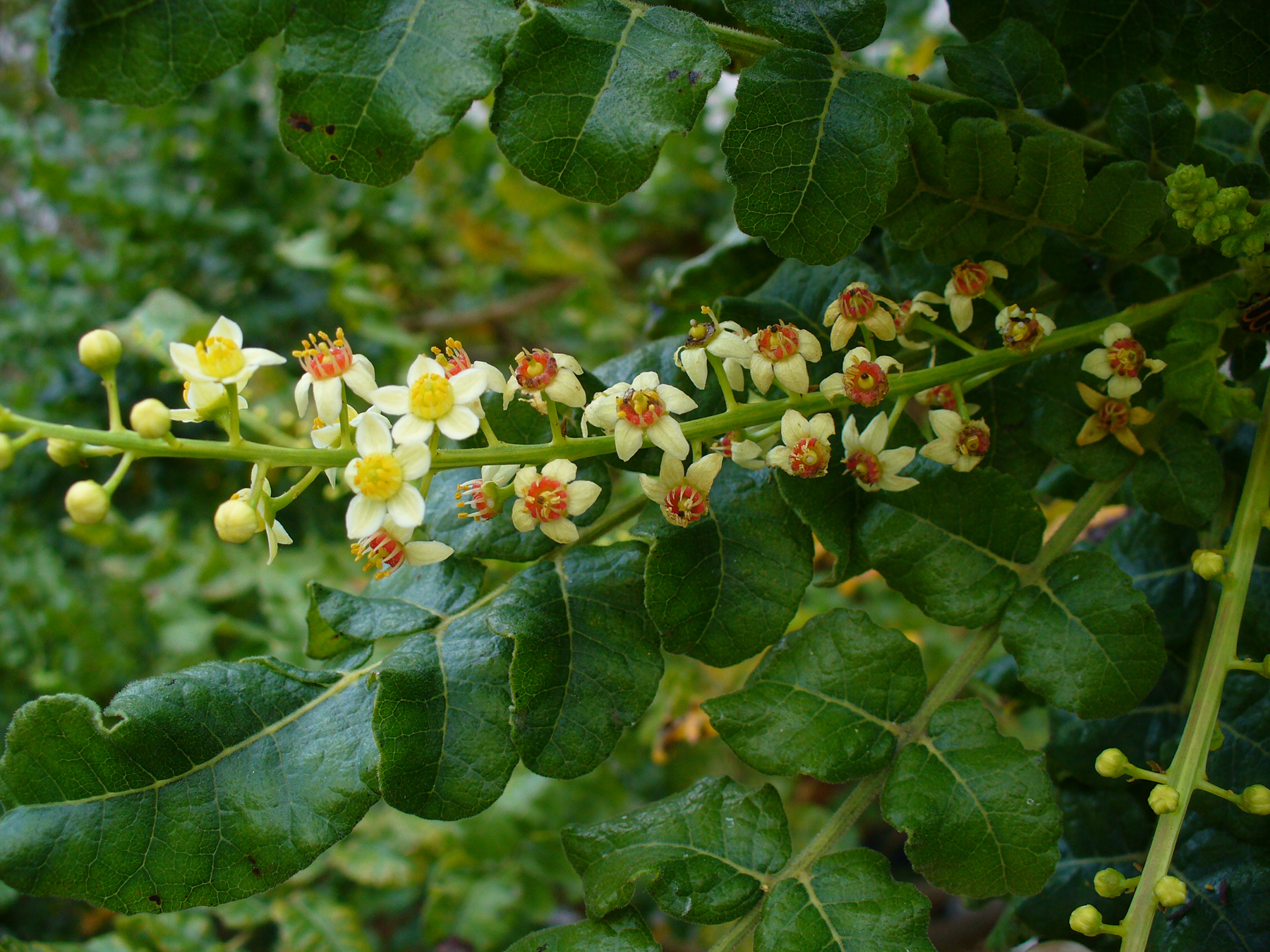
The genus Boswellia, from which frankincense is harvested

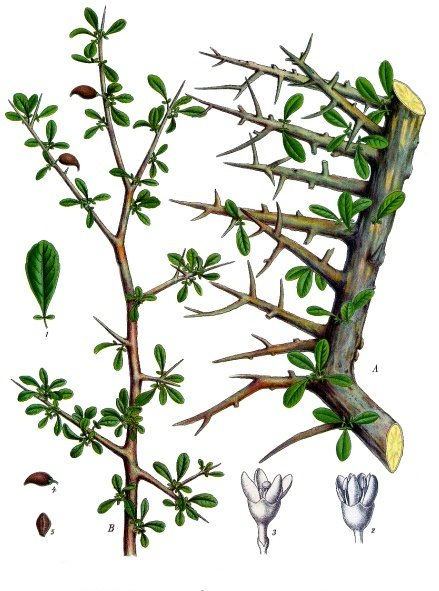
Myrrh

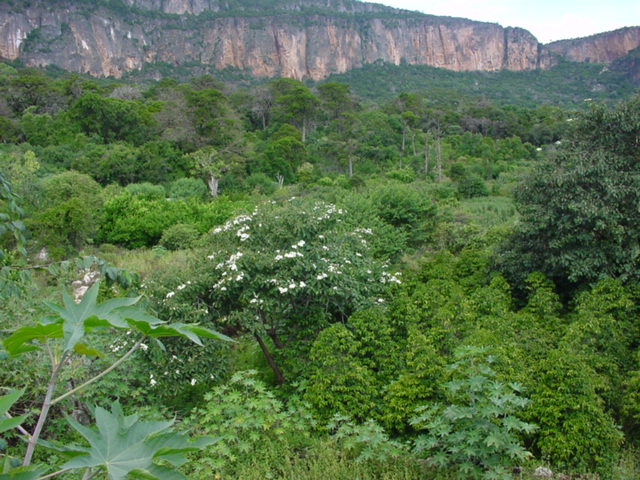
Closeup of Cal Madow's plant species

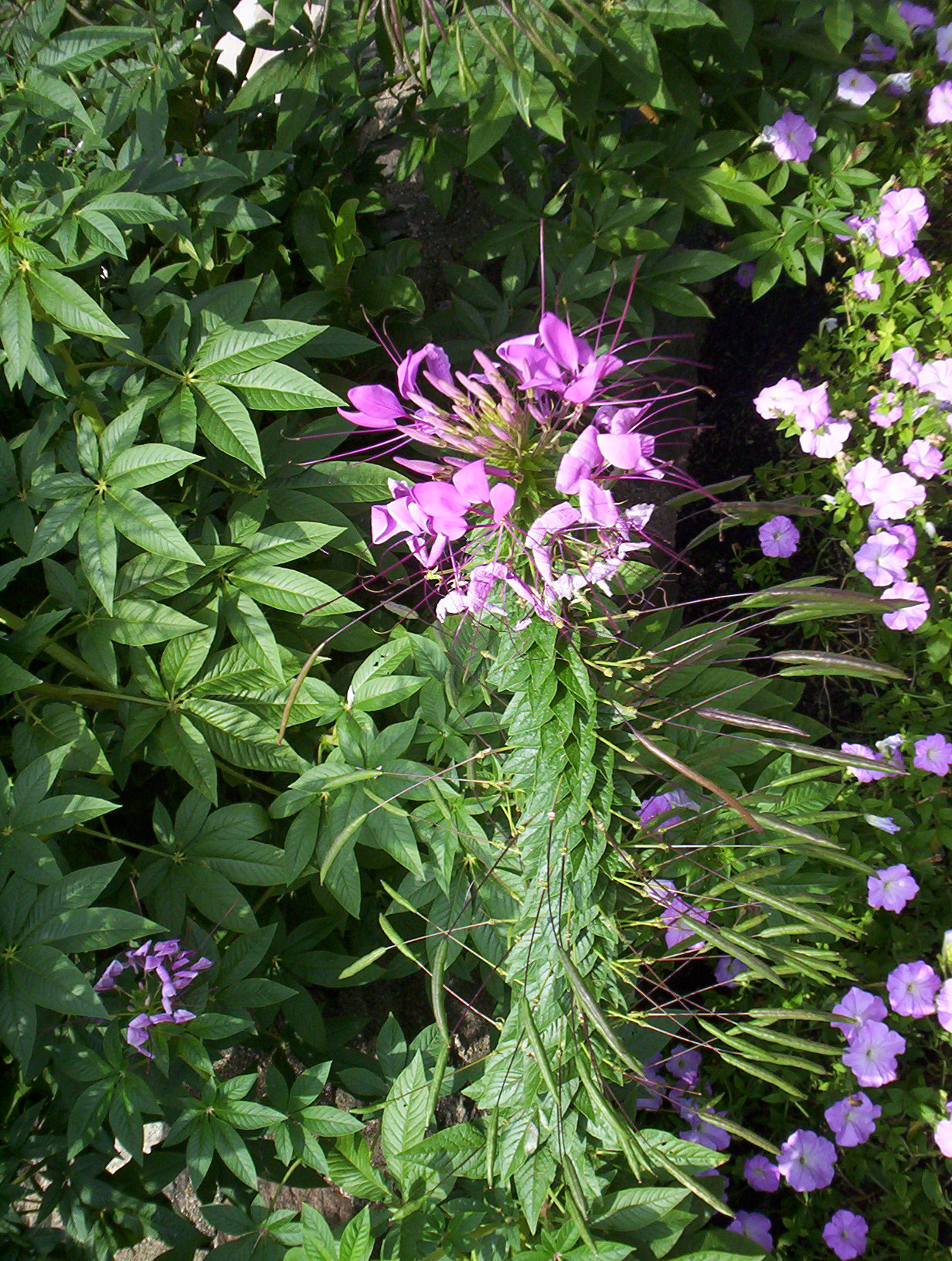
Cleomaceae

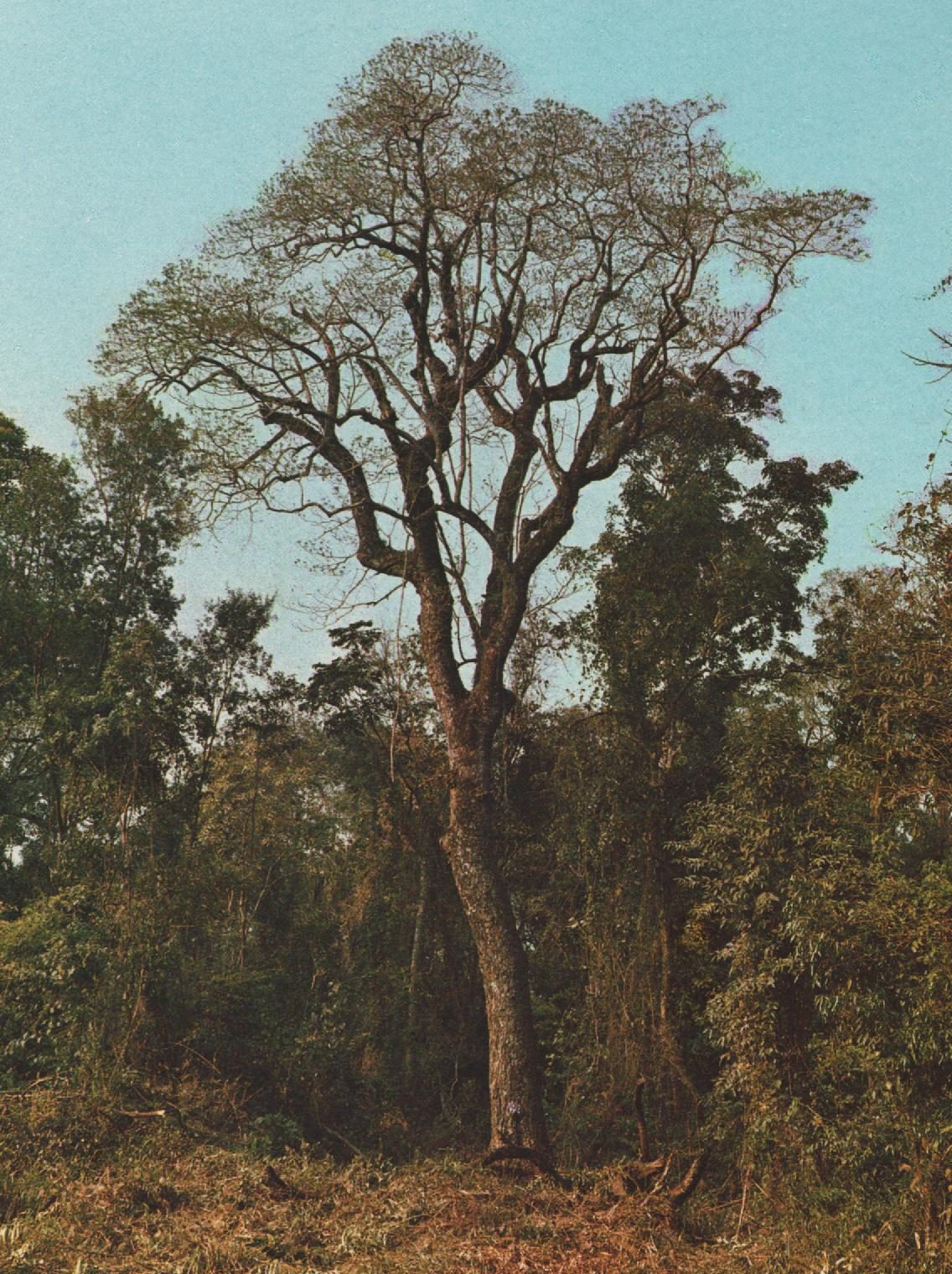
Balsam
