= History of the transitional federal government of Somalia =

The transitional federal government (TFG) was the government of Somalia between 2004 and 2012. Established 2004 in Djibouti through various international conferences, it was an attempt to restore national institutions to the country after the 1991 collapse of the Siad Barre government and the ensuing Somali Civil War.

There were two distinct phases of the transitional government: the transitional national government (TNG) and the transitional federal government:

- The transitional national government (TNG) was formed in April–May 2000 at the Somalia National Peace Conference (SNPC) in Djibouti. It had the following:
  - 2000: Election of Abdiqasim Salad Hassan as president by the clan/faction representatives;
  - 2001: National Commission for Reconciliation and Property Settlement;
  - 2002: 2002 Somali Reconciliation Conference in Eldoret, Kenya.

The TNG was opposed by a rival pan-Somali governmental movement, known as the Somalia Reconciliation and Restoration Council (SRRC). Eventually the factions of the TNG and the SRRC were reconciled, and a new united movement subsequently developed, dubbed the transitional federal government (TFG).

- The Transitional Federal Government (TFG) was formed in October–November 2004 in Nairobi, Kenya with the adoption of the following transitional federal institutions (TFI), all accomplished by the end of the sessions:
  - Selection of 275 transitional federal parliament (TFP) members;
  - Approval of the Transitional Federal Charter (TFC);
  - Election of Abdullahi Yusuf Ahmed as President of Somalia and head of the TFG by the Parliament (October 10), and his appointment of the Council of Ministers, including Prime Minister Ali Mohammed Ghedi (November 4).

== 2000 ==
=== Somalia National Peace Conference ===
Officially dubbed the 2002 Somalia National Peace Conference (SNPC), and sometimes called the Djibouti conference, this was a series of meetings held in Arta, Djibouti, on April 20 – May 5, 2000. The conference was aimed at bringing together representatives of the warring factions of Somalia to end the civil war that had claimed over 300,000 lives. The name Transitional National Government (TNG) was selected for the movement at this time.

=== Presidency of Abdiqasim Salad Hassan (2000–2004) ===
Abdiqasim Salad Hassan served as the interim President from August 27, 2000 until October 14, 2004. He was instrumental in negotiating early supporters of the TNG:

- December 2000 – Hussein Haji Bod
- February 2001 – Mohamed Qanyare Afrah, appointed Minister of Fisheries and Marine Resources, and later, Security Minister
- ??? – Osman Ali Atto
- June 18, 2001 – Barre Adan Shire Hiiraale, of the Juba Valley Alliance (JVA), later appointed Minister of Reconstruction and Resettlement and Defense Minister

=== Conference attendees who later opposed the TNG ===
- General Omar Haji Mohamed "Masale" – Somali National Front (SNF)
- Hassan Mohamed Nur "Shatigudud" – Rahanwein Resistance Army (RRA)
- Abdullahi Sheikh Ismail – Southern Somali National Movement-Biennal Resistance Movement (SSNM-BIREM), though he later joined the TFG as deputy prime minister and foreign minister

== 2001 ==
=== National Commission for Reconciliation and Property Settlement ===
On May 6, 2001, an effort to create a 25-member working body, dubbed the National Commission for Reconciliation and Property Settlement (NCRPS), was damaged when Abdirizak Haji Hussein, former Prime Minister, was named as its head. The Somalia Reconciliation and Restoration Council (SRRC) and Puntland leadership objected strongly. Hussein later resigned on July 25, 2001.

=== Leaders factions opposed to the TNG in 2001 ===
- Hussein Mohamed Farah Aidid – Somalia Reconciliation and Restoration Council (SRRC)
- Musse Sudi "Yallahow"

== 2002 ==
=== Somali Reconciliation Conference ===
Held in Eldoret, Kenya, this conference was attended by most TFG supporters. However, at the time, the Rahanweyn Resistance Army (RRA) was still hotly contending with other factions, including warlord Adan Madobe, who captured Baidoa. The RRA accused the Juba Valley Alliance of assisting the warlord OF ERA, an accusation denied by the JVA leader Barre Adan Shire Hiiraale.

== 2004 ==
=== Transitional Federal Charter ===
In February 2004, at Nairobi, Kenya, the government endorsed the Transitional Federal Charter of the Somali Republic.

=== Presidency of Abdullahi Yusuf Ahmed (2004–2008) ===
On October 10, 2004, in a session held by the TFP in Nairobi, Ahmed was elected as president of the TFG, an interim federal administrative body that he had helped establish earlier in the year. He received 189 votes from the TFG Parliament, while the closest contender, erstwhile Somali ambassador to Washington Abdullahi Ahmed Addou, got 79 votes in the third round of voting. The then incumbent President of Somalia, Abdiqasim Salad Hassan, peacefully withdrew his candidature. Ahmed was sworn in a few days later on October 14, 2004.

=== Transitional federal government formed ===
After his election, Yusuf formed the first council of ministers by appointing cabinet officials in November 2004. One of his key appointments was Ali Mohammed Ghedi as prime minister.

== 2006 ==
=== Parliament held in Baidoa ===
On February 26, 2006 the parliament first met inside Somalia, in the city of Baidoa, 260 kilometers northwest of Mogadishu. 210 lawmakers of the 275-member parliament met in a grain warehouse temporarily converted into a meeting hall. For this reason the Transitional Federal Government was sometimes referred to as the "Baidoa Government."

=== Firings ===
In June 2006, Ghedi sacked four ministers, part of the CIA-backed Alliance for the Restoration of Peace and Counter-Terrorism, who ignored his orders to stop fighting the Supreme Islamic Courts Council in the Second Battle of Mogadishu. They were:

- National security minister Mohamed Afrah Qanyare
- Commerce minister Musa Sudi Yalahow
- Militia rehabilitation minister Issa Botan Alin and
- Religious affairs minister Omar Muhamoud Finnish

=== Resignations ===
Following the success of the Supreme Islamic Courts Council in taking Mogadishu, and the alleged entry of Ethiopian troops into Somalia, members of the transitional government started to resign. Before the resignations started, the government consisted of 42 full ministers and a further 60 assistant ministers. The government would have to resign if more than 50% – 22 – of the full ministers resigned.

On 27 July 2006 18 members resigned including the public works minister Osman Ali Atto, who said "Our government failed to implement national reconciliation, so we have decided to resign."

Ghedi survived a no-confidence vote on July 30 when his opponents failed to obtain the two-thirds majority required to dismiss him.

On August 1 eight more ministers resigned in protest at prime minister Ali Mohammed Ghedi's postponement of talks with the Islamic Court. Fisheries Minister Hassan Abshir Farah said "We had no option but to resign because we believe if the talks are postponed again it will affect the reconciliation efforts"

By August 2, twenty-nine ministers had resigned including eleven full ministers.

By August 3 the tally had reached 36, including former prime minister and health minister Muhammad Abdi Yusuf, who complained that "Our government is a reconciliation government, the prime minister has failed to honor that"

By August 4, forty cabinet members and 16 full ministers had quit, including reconstruction minister Barre Shire Adan who said "I have resigned because the government of Ali Mohammed Ghedi has failed to deliver"

On Monday August 7 the three top TFG leaders – Prime Minister Ghedi, President Ahmed and parliamentary speaker Sharif Hassan Sheikh Aden reportedly reached an agreement on talks with the Islamic Militia and the formation of a new government. The President announced the dissolution of the present cabinet and Ghedi was asked to propose a new cabinet, with only 31 full ministers, within a week.

=== New cabinet ===
On August 21 Prime Minister Gedi appointed a new reduced cabinet of 31 ministers. It included new Ministers for national security, defence, finance and foreign-affairs but retained former warlord Hussein Mohamed Aidid as Interior Minister. 44 deputy ministers will also be appointed in the coming days. The Assembly was due to vote on approving the cabinet on 2006-08-26 but this vote was delayed amid fears that the new government wouldn't be approved.

=== Rise of the ICU, Ethiopian intervention ===
The government faced off against the ICU between June and December 2006, as the Islamists spread out from Mogadishu. Troops from Ethiopia protected the government position in Baidoa. Ethiopia claimed until recently the troops only numbered in the hundreds, comprising trainers and advisors for the federal government's army. The opposition Islamic Courts Union (ICU) claimed they numberered in the tens of thousands.

On December 15, 2006, sixty government members, including Member of Parliament Omar Hashii, gathered in Mogadishu to protest the presence of the foreign troops.

Late in December, the government won a series of victories at the battles of Baidoa, Bandiradley, Beledweyne, Jowhar and Jilib. At the end of the year the TFG took possession of Mogadishu and on New Year's Day, 2007, Kismayo.

== 2007 ==
=== New administrator for Hiiran ===
On January 1, 2007, Somali President Ahmed declared a new administrator for Hiiran region, replacing Dabageed. Hussein Mohamud Moalim was named as new administrator, and Saleyman Ahmed Hilawle was nominated as assistant administrator.

=== Disarmament ===
On January 1, 2007, Somali Prime Minister Ali Mohammed Gedi announced "The warlord era in Mogadishu is now over."

He said all civilian groups and businesses would have three days to disarm and turn their weapons in to the government. Technicals were to be brought to the old port in Mogadishu. All collected arms would be registered at Villa Somalia. An amnesty to Islamists was also extended.

=== Replacement of the speaker ===
On January 17, 2007, the parliament removed the speaker, Sharif Hassan Sheikh Adan, by a vote of 183 in favor of removal to 8 against and one abstention. The Speaker had been accused of being absent from Parliamentary sessions for months, and for being supportive of the Islamic Courts Union. The parliament met in a converted grain warehouse in Baidoa. Parliament planned to replace the Speaker within two weeks.

On January 31, 2007, Sheikh Adan Madobe was elected as the new Speaker by the Parliament, receiving 154 of the 275 votes. The runner up was Ibrahim Adan Hassan, with 54 votes.

=== Sacking of ministers ===
On February 7, 2007, Prime Minister Ghedi announced that he was dismissing three ministers: Health Minister Abdiaziz Sheikh Yusuf, Higher Education and Culture Minister Hussein Mohamud Sheikh Hussein, both for failing to carry out duties and misappropriating funds, and Mineral and Water Resources Minister Mohamud Salad Nuur for failing to be sworn in after his appointment. Interior Minister Hussein Aidid was also transferred to the less prestigious position of Public Works and Housing. A total of 10 cabinet positions were reassigned in the reorganization.

== 2008–2009 ==
Throughout 2007 and 2008, the Al-Shabaab group of militants scored military victories, seizing control of key towns and ports in both central and southern Somalia. At the end of 2008, the group had captured Baidoa but not Mogadishu. By January 2009, Al-Shabaab and other militias had managed to force the Ethiopian troops to withdraw from the country, leaving behind an underequipped African Union (AU) peacekeeping force.

Over the next few months, a new President was elected from amongst the more moderate Islamists, and the Transitional Federal Government, with the help of a small team of African Union troops, began a counteroffensive in February 2009 to retake control of the southern half of the country. To solidify its control of southern Somalia, the TFG formed an alliance with the Islamic Courts Union and other members of the Alliance for the Re-liberation of Somalia. Furthermore, Al-Shabaab and Hizbul Islam, the two main Islamist groups in opposition, began to fight amongst themselves in mid-2009.

As a truce, in March 2009, Somalia's newly established coalition government announced that it would implement shari'a as the nation's official judicial system.

== 2010–2012 ==
On October 14, 2010, diplomat Mohamed Abdullahi Mohamed was appointed the new Prime Minister of Somalia after the resignation of Premier Omar Abdirashid Ali Sharmarke.

Per the Transitional Federal Government's (TFG) Charter, Prime Minister Mohamed named a new Cabinet on November 12, 2010, which has been lauded by the international community. The allotted ministerial positions were reduced from 39 to 18. Only two Ministers from the previous Cabinet were reappointed: Hussein Abdi Halane, the former Minister of Finance and a well-regarded figure in the international community, was put in charge of a consolidated Ministry of Finance and Treasury; and Dr. Mohamud Abdi Ibrahim remained the minister of Commerce and Industry. Ahlu Sunna Waljama'a, a moderate Sufi group and an important military ally of the TFG, was also accorded the key Interior and Labour ministries. The remaining ministerial positions were largely assigned to technocrats new to the Somali political arena.

In its first 50 days in office, Prime Minister Mohamed's new administration completed its first monthly payment of stipends to government soldiers, and initiated the implementation of a full biometric register for the security forces within a window of four months. Additional members of the Independent Constitutional Commission were also appointed to engage Somali constitutional lawyers, religious scholars and experts in Somali culture over the nation's upcoming new constitution, a key part of the government's Transitional Federal Tasks. In addition, high level federal delegations were dispatched to defuse clan-related tensions in several regions. According to the prime minister of Somalia, to improve transparency, Cabinet ministers fully disclosed their assets and signed a code of ethics. On the war front, the new government and its AMISOM allies also managed to secure control of Mogadishu by August 2011.

On June 19, 2011, Mohamed Abdullahi Mohamed resigned from his position as Prime Minister of Somalia as part of the controversial Kampala Accord's conditions. The agreement would also see the mandates of the President, the Parliament Speaker and Deputies extended until August 2012, after which point new elections were to be organized. Abdiweli Mohamed Ali, Mohamed's former Minister of Planning and International Cooperation, was later named permanent Prime Minister.

In February 2012, Somali government officials met in the northeastern town of Garowe to discuss post-transition arrangements. After extensive deliberations attended by regional actors and international observers, the conference ended in a signed agreement between TFG President Sharif Sheikh Ahmed, Prime Minister Abdiweli Mohamed Ali, Speaker of Parliament Sharif Adan Sharif Hassan, Puntland President Abdirahman Mohamed Farole, Galmudug President Mohamed Ahmed Alim and Ahlu Sunnah Wal Jama'a representative Khalif Abdulkadir Noor stipulating that: a) a new 225 member bicameral parliament would be formed, consisting of an upper house seating 54 Senators as well as a lower house; b) 30% of the National Constituent Assembly (NCA) is earmarked for women; c) the President is to be appointed via a constitutional election; and d) the Prime Minister is selected by the President and subsequently names the Cabinet. On June 23, 2012, the Somali federal and regional leaders met again and approved a draft constitution after several days of deliberation. The National Constituent Assembly overwhelmingly passed the new constitution on August 1, with 96% voting for it, 2% against it, and 2% abstaining.

== End of mandate ==
The Federal Government of Somalia was established on August 20, 2012, concurrent with the end of the TFG's interim mandate. It represents the first permanent central government in the country since the start of the civil war. The Federal Parliament of Somalia serves as the government's legislative branch.
