= 2018 timeline of the Somali Civil War =

This is a 2018 timeline of events in the Somali Civil War (2009–present).

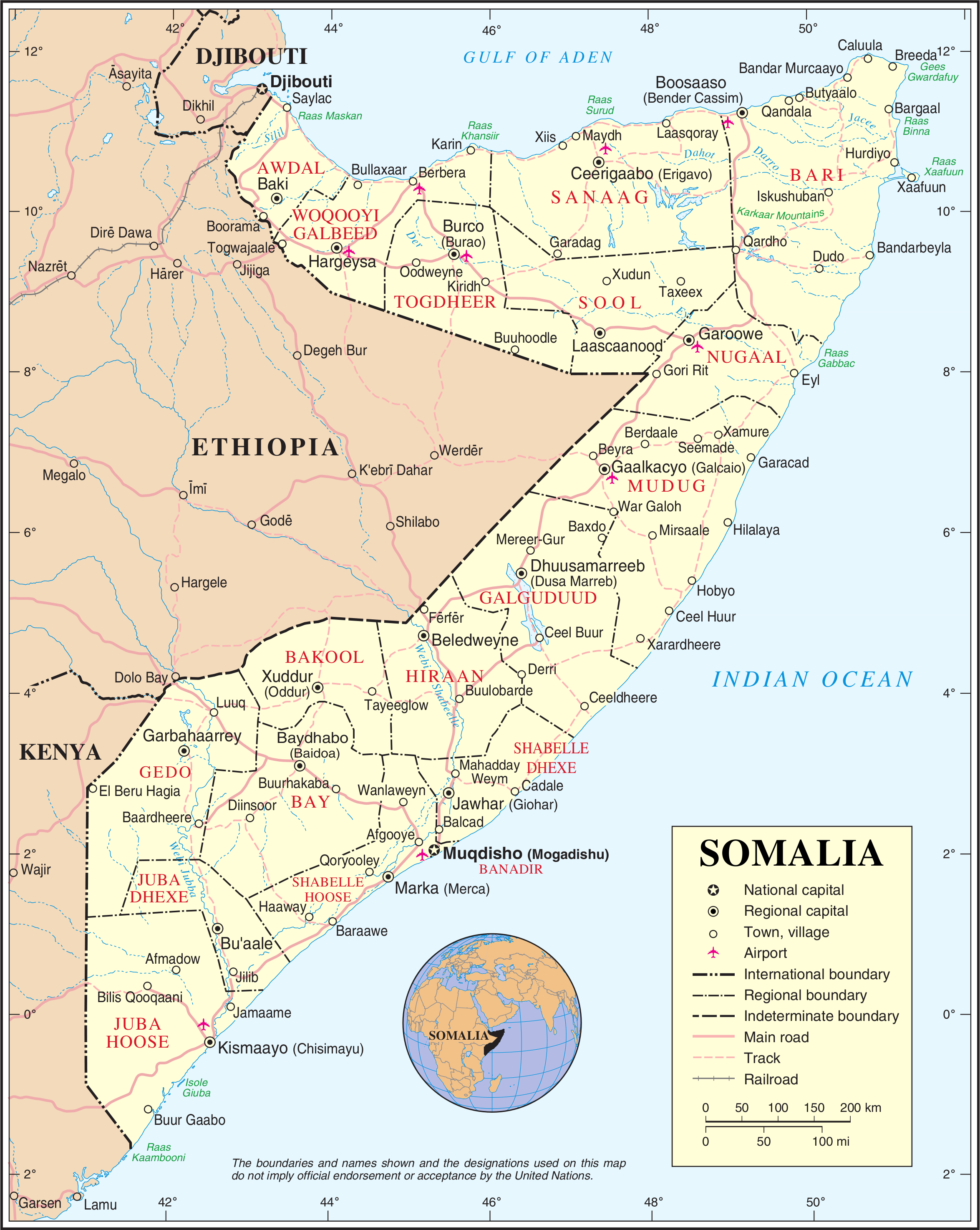
General map of Somalia

== January ==
- January 5 – An African Union peacekeeper was killed, and two others were wounded in a landmine explosion in Buloburde District. Two men, including a prominent local traditional elder have been assassinated by suspected al-Shabaab militants in Afgoye district in Lower Shabelle. Assailants shot and killed two civilians at Koodka neighborhood Mogadishu
- January 8 – At least two Somali soldiers were injured in a grenade attack on an army checkpoint outside Beledweyne, the regional capital of Hiran.
- January 9 – A bomb explosion in the heart of Mogadishu, the Somali capital has wounded at least three government soldiers aboard a military vehicle.
- January 11 – One civilian was killed and several were wounded after mortar rounds landed near the Presidential Palace in Mogadishu.
- January 14 – Five Somali soldiers were wounded when their military vehicle hit a landmine in Mogadishu. Al-Shabaab fighters attacked a remote Somali army base north of the capital Mogadishu, killing at least two Somali government soldiers.
- January 23 – Four people have been killed and six others wounded in a remote-controlled improvised explosive device explosion near Mogadishu.
- January 27 – Al-Shabaab militants have shot and killed an assistant judge in Wanlaweyn district in Somalia's Southern Lower Shabelle region.
- January 29 – A Somali army colonel and three soldiers were killed following an attack on a convoy by Al-Shabaab militants in Bay region in Southern Somalia.
- January 30 – A roadside bomb hit a military vehicle carrying Puntland soldiers in the vicinity of Galgala hills of Bari region, killing at least one soldier, wounding 3 others.

== February ==
- February 1 – A roadside bomb explosion killed at least three people and wounded two others in an area outside Mogadishu, the Somali capital.
- February 4 – Four people have been killed and five others injured in a bomb explosion inside a house in the Somali capital Mogadishu.
- February 5 – Assailants have shot and killed a former district commissioner in Beledweyne, the regional capital of Hiran province in central Somalia.
- February 6 – Five soldiers were wounded in an overnight attack on a police station in Bosaso, the main commercial city of the northeastern semi-autonomous region of Puntland. Two people were killed in an attack on a police station by al-Shabaab militants in Jalalaqsi town in Hiran region of central Somalia. Three people were killed in separate shootings in Mogadishu by al-Shabaab assassins.
- February 7 – A senior Somali military officer was assassinated in Mogadishu, the Somali capital. Five Somali soldiers were killed and four others wounded in a roadside explosion in Afgooye district in Lower Shabelle region.
- February 10 – Al-Shabaab militants attacked Afgooye town, about 30 km southwest of Mogadishu. Three civilians were injured in the attack.
- February 12 – Two Kenyans have been stabbed to death by al-Shabaab fighters for allegedly spying for Somalia and Kenyan intelligence services in Qunyo Barrow town, Lower Shabelle region.
- February 15 – One person has been injured after an explosive device attached to his vehicle went off in Waberi district.
- February 16 – At least two Puntland soldiers were killed in a roadside bomb blast in Galgala Mountains of Bari region. Another was injured in the attack.
- February 23 – At least 45 people were killed and 36 others injured in two car bombings and subsequent gunfire in Mogadishu. Five attackers were also killed in the attack.

== March ==
- March 1 – At least three people were killed and three others were wounded when a suicide car bomb blast targeted a security checkpoint in Sinka Dher on the outskirts of the Somali capital Mogadishu. Another three people were killed and two injured in a mortar attack in Mogadishu.
- March 2 – A suicide bomber rammed his explosives-laden minibus into a military camp in Afgooye, a district in Lower Shabelle region, killing at least 5 Somali soldiers and wounding several others. 6 other government soldiers died after a remote-controlled landmine targeted a convoy carrying injured soldiers from Afgooye to Mogadishu. At least three Burundian soldiers of the African Union Mission to Somalia were killed in an al-Shabaab attack near Jowhar, Somalia. Seven others were injured, four were still missing, and one armoured vehicle and four trucks were damaged during the attack.
- March 10 – At least four members of the Somali security force were killed and another injured in a remote-controlled improvised explosive device attack on the outskirts of Mogadishu.
- March 11 – Al-Shabaab assailants have shot and killed at least three people in Mogadishu, the Somali capital.
- March 12 – At least one soldier was killed and several others were wounded in Mogadishu in a shootout between Somali security forces and al-Shabaab militants.
- March 14 – Two Puntland bomb disposal experts were killed in a roadside bomb explosion in the Galgala Mountains of Bari region.
- March 15 – Three people were killed and two others injured in a grenade attack in Bosaso, the commercial city of Somalia's northeastern Puntland region.
- March 22 – 18 people were killed and 22 others wounded in a car bomb explosion near a hotel in the Somali capital Mogadishu.
- March 25 – At least four people were killed and ten others injured in a suicide car bomb attack near Somalia's parliament headquarters in Mogadishu.
- March 27 – A Somali lawmaker was shot dead by al-Shabaab assassins in her home in Mogadishu.

== September ==
- September 2 – A suicide bombing is carried out in Mogadishu by Al-Shabaab. The blast left 3 people dead.

== October ==
- October 1 – A suicide car bomber by the group Al-Shabaab struck an EU convoy carrying Italian soldiers in Mogadishu, killing 2 civilians and injuring at least 5.
- October 1 – Islamic state attackers shot dead 3 Ethiopians and injured 4 in Bosaso town, the attackers fled the scene.
- October 9 – Al-Shabaab executed 5 people by a firing squad, accused of spying for US and British intelligence forces near the town of Jilib.
- October 13 – At least 16 people were killed and 50 were wounded when twin suicide bombings targeted a restaurant and a coffee shop in Baidoa. A grenade was also thrown into a nearby hotel.

== See also ==
- Somali Civil War (2009–present)
