= Granchi's leaf-toed gecko =

Conservation status
- Data Deficient (IUCN 3.1)

Scientific classification
- Kingdom: Animalia
- Phylum: Chordata
- Class: Reptilia
- Order: Squamata
- Suborder: Gekkota
- Family: Gekkonidae
- Genus: Hemidactylus
- Species: H. granchii

Binomial name
- Hemidactylus granchii Lanza, 1978

Species of lizard

Granchi's leaf-toed gecko (Hemidactylus granchii) is a species of lizard in the family Gekkonidae. The species is endemic to Somalia.

== Etymology ==
The specific name, granchii, is in honor of Italian herpetologist Edoardo Granchi of the Museo di Storia Naturale di Firenze.

== Habitat ==
The preferred natural habitats of H. granchii are savanna and shrubland.

== Reproduction ==
H. granchii is oviparous.
