= Alcohol in Somalia =

Alcohol in Somalia is prohibited by the country's Muslim culture, but historically was allowed in the country and continues to exist illicitly. During the period of Italian Somalia, rum was produced from local sugarcane, continuing until the fall of the Siad Barre Government in 1991, though others have reported rum consumption amongst Somali Bantu Christians.
