= Economic history of Somalia =

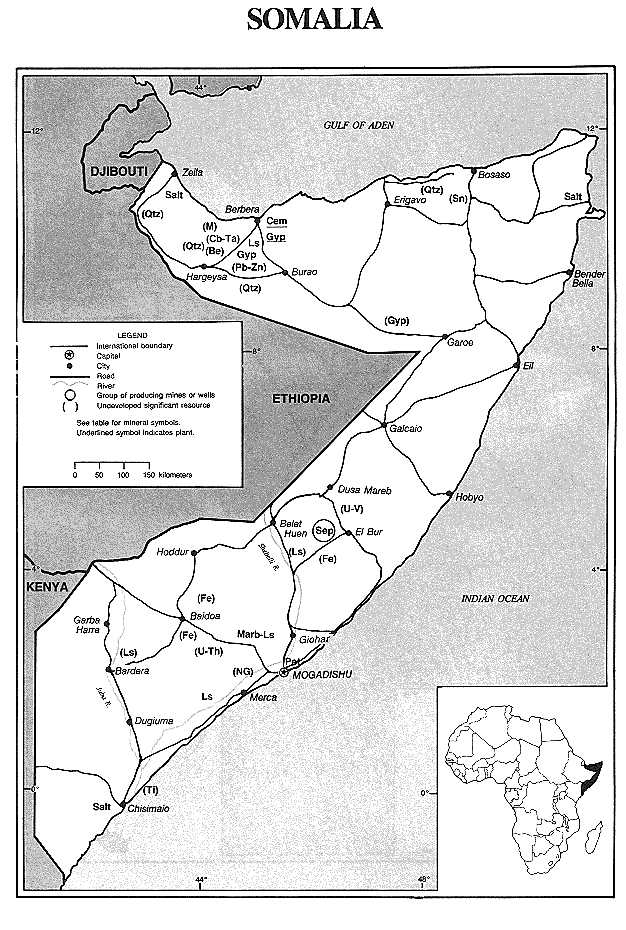
Somalia minerals mined

Economic history of Somalia is related to the development of Somalia's economy in the last two centuries.

== Colonial economy ==
The colonial era did not spark foreign economic investment despite the competition of two major European powers in the area of present-day Somalia. Italy controlled southern Somalia; Britain northern Somalia, especially the coastal region. Italian parliamentary opposition restricted any government activity in Somalia for years after European treaties recognized Italian claims.

The economy of Somalia italiana was initially based only on primitive agriculture, fishing, commerce and pastoralism of subsistence with great infusion of money from Italy since the end of the 19th century. In the early twentieth century, projects aimed at using Somalia as a settlement for Italian citizens from the crowded homeland failed. Although in the early 1930s Benito Mussolini drew up ambitious plans for economic development, actual investment was modest in comparison to what was done in Italian Eritrea.

There was still less investment in British Somaliland, which British India had administered. During the prime ministership of William Ewart Gladstone in the 1880s, it was decided that the British Indian government should be responsible for administering the Somaliland protectorate because the Somali coast's strategic location on the Gulf of Aden was important to British India. Customs taxes helped pay for British India's patrol of Somalia's Red Sea Coast. The biggest investment by the British colonial government in its three-quarters of a century of rule was in putting down the rebellion of the dervishes. In 1947, long after the dervish war of the early 1900s, the entire budget for the administration of the British protectorate was only £213,139. If Italy's rhetoric concerning Somalia outpaced performance, Britain had no illusions about its protectorate in Somaliland. At best, the Somali protectorate had some strategic value to Britain's eastern trading empire in protecting the trade route to Aden and British India and helping assure a steady supply of food for Aden. The two major economic developments of the colonial era were the establishment of plantations in the inter-riverine area and the creation of a salaried official class. In the south, the Italians laid the basis for profitable export-oriented agriculture, primarily in bananas, through the creation of plantations and irrigation systems. In both the north and the south, a stable petty bourgeois class emerged. Somalis became civil servants, teachers, and soldiers, petty traders in coastal cities, and small-business proprietors.

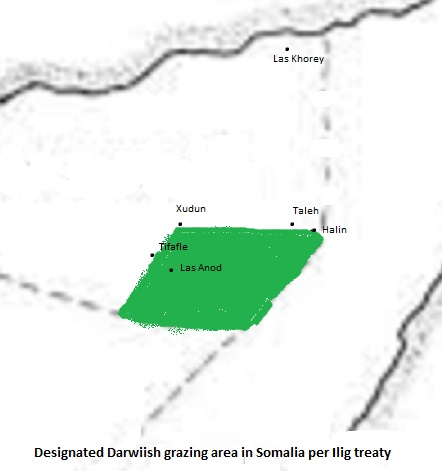
Territory designated for Darwiish grazing in the Ilig Treaty.

The plantation system began in 1919, with the arrival in Somalia of Prince Luigi Amedeo of Savoy, Duke of Abruzzi, and with the technical support of the fascist administration of Governor Cesare Maria de Vecchi de Val Cismon. The Shebelle Valley was chosen as the site of these plantations because for most of the year the Shebelle River had sufficient water for irrigation. The plantations produced cotton (the first Somali export crop after colonization), sugar, and bananas. Banana exports to Italy began in 1927, and gained primary importance in the colony after 1929, when the world cotton market collapsed. Somali bananas could not compete in price with those from the Canary Islands, but in 1927 and 1930 Italy passed laws imposing tariffs on all non-Somali bananas. These laws facilitated Somali agricultural development so that between 1929 and 1936 the area under banana cultivation increased seventeenfold to 39.75 km^{2}. By 1935 the Italian government had constituted a Royal Banana Monopoly (Regia Azienda Monopolio Banane—RAMB) to organize banana exports under state authority. Seven Italian ships were put at RAMB's disposal to encourage the Somali banana trade. After World War II, when the United Nations (UN) granted republican Italy jurisdiction over Somalia as a trust territory, RAMB was reconstituted as the Banana Plantation Monopoly (Azienda Monopolio Banane—AMB) to encourage the revival of a sector that had been nearly demolished by the war.

Plantation agriculture under Italian tutelage had short-term success, but Somali products never became internationally competitive. In 1955 a total of 235 concessions embraced more than 453 km^{2} (with only 74 km^{2} devoted to bananas), and produced 94,000 tons of bananas. Under fixed contracts, the three banana trade associations sold their output to the AMB, which exacted an indirect tax on the Italian consumer by keeping out cheaper bananas from other sources. The protected Italian market was a mixed blessing for the Somali banana sector. Whereas it made possible the initial penetration by Somali bananas of the Italian marketplace, it also eliminated incentives for Somali producers to become internationally competitive or to seek markets beyond Italy.

The investment in cotton showed fewer long-term results than the investment in bananas. Cotton showed some promise in 1929, but its price fell following the collapse in the world market. Nearly 1,400 tons in 1929 exports shrank to about 400 tons by 1937. During the trust period, there were years of modest success; in 1952, for example, about 1,000 tons of cotton were exported. There was however, no consistent growth. In 1953 exports dropped by two-thirds. Two reasons are given for cotton's failure as an export crop: an unstable world market and the lack of Somali wage labor for cotton harvesting. Because of the labor scarcity, Italian concessionaires worked out coparticipation contracts with Somali farmers; the Italians received sole purchasing rights to the crop in return for providing seed, cash advances, and technical support.

Another plantation crop, sugarcane, was more successful. The sugar economy differed from the banana and cotton economies in two respects: sugar was raised for domestic consumption, and a single firm, the Italo-Somali Agricultural Society (Societa Agricola Italo-Somala—SAIS), headquartered in Genoa, controlled the sector. Organized in 1920, the SAIS estate near Giohar had, by the time of the trust period, a little less than 20 km² under cultivation. In 1950 the sugar factory's output reached 4,000 tons, enough to meet about 80 percent of domestic demand; by 1957 production had reached 11,000 tons, and Italian Somaliland no longer imported sugar.

Labor shortages beset Italian concessionaires and administrators in all plantation industries. Most Somalis refused to work on farms for wage labor. The Italians at first conscripted the Bantu people who lived in the agricultural region. Later, Italian companies paid wages to agricultural families to plant and harvest export crops, and permitted them to keep private gardens on some of the irrigated land. This strategy met with some success, and a relatively permanent work force developed. Somali plantation agriculture was of only marginal significance to the world economy, however. Banana exports reached US$6.4 million in 1957; those of cotton, US$200,000. But in 1957 plantation exports constituted 59 percent of total exports, representing a major contribution to the Somali economy.

The colonial period also involved government employment of salaried officials and the concomitant growth of a small urban petty bourgeoisie. In the north, the British administration originally had concentrated on the coastal area for trading purposes but soon discovered that livestock to be traded came from the interior. Therefore, it was necessary to safeguard caravan routes and keep peace in port areas, requiring the development of police forces and other civil services. In British Somaliland, many of the nomads scorned European education and opposed the establishment of Christian missions. Consequently, only a small pool of literate Somalis was available to work for the British administration. Kenyans therefore were hired. In the south, however, Somalis sent children to colonial and mission schools, and the graduates found civil service positions in the police force and as customs agents, bookkeepers, medical personnel, and teachers. These civil servants became a natural market for new retail businesses, restaurants, and coffee shops. Baidoa in the precolonial period had almost no permanent commercial establishments; by 1945, nearly 500 businesses were registered in the district. The new salaried class filled the ranks of the Somali nationalist movement after World War II. Literate in Italian or English, these urban Somalis challenged colonial rule.

Furthermore, the Italian Somalia economy was even improved by the salt industry. Indeed, in 1930, an Italian firm invested capital to exploit salt deposits in Hafun, then called "Dante". By 1933–34, the Hafun salt works were producing more than 200,000 metric tons of salt, most of which was exported to the Far East. It was one of the main salt facilities in the world and had a cable-transport system of 24 km. In 2014 there were made plans to revive this huge factory

In the 1930s Italian Empire, the Italian government promoted auto & moto competitions in order to increase the image of Italy (inside the colonial populations and in the world) as a technological country with state-of-the-art mechanical industry. Indeed, Italian Mogadiscio in 1938 was the second manufacturing city -after Italian Asmara- in the Eastern Africa's Italian Empire. The triangle Mogadiscio-Genale-Villabruzzi (actual Mogadishu-Afgoi- Jowhar) was the most developed area of the Italian colony, with one of the biggest vehicles concentration (per inhabitants) of all Africa: nearly 3000 vehicles in 1939. It is noteworthy that in British Somaliland there were no vehicles for civilians until after WWII (the few were only for military use ).

== Development during the Italian Trust Administration ==
In 1950, during the beginning of the ten years of the Trust Administration of Somalia under Italy, the "Cassa per la Circolazione Monetaria della Somalia" (Cassa for the monetary circulation of Somalia) was set up, established officially in a public law institution in 1954; in the same year the "Somali Credit" was established. At the same time, in British Somaliland, the National and Grindlais Bank (former Indian National Bank) opened some branches in Berbera and Hargeisa.

On 1 July 1960 the former Italian Somalia merged with the State of Somaliland, still under British jurisdiction, to form the fully independent Republic of Somalia. In this perspective, the government of the former Italian Somalia, led by Abdullahi Issa Mohamud, established the Somali National Bank (decree of 30 June 1960): the new bank would have carried out the central bank activities, previously done by the "Cassa for monetary circulation". Indeed the Italian government provided Somalia with technical and financial assistance and ordered the liquidation of the "Cassa".

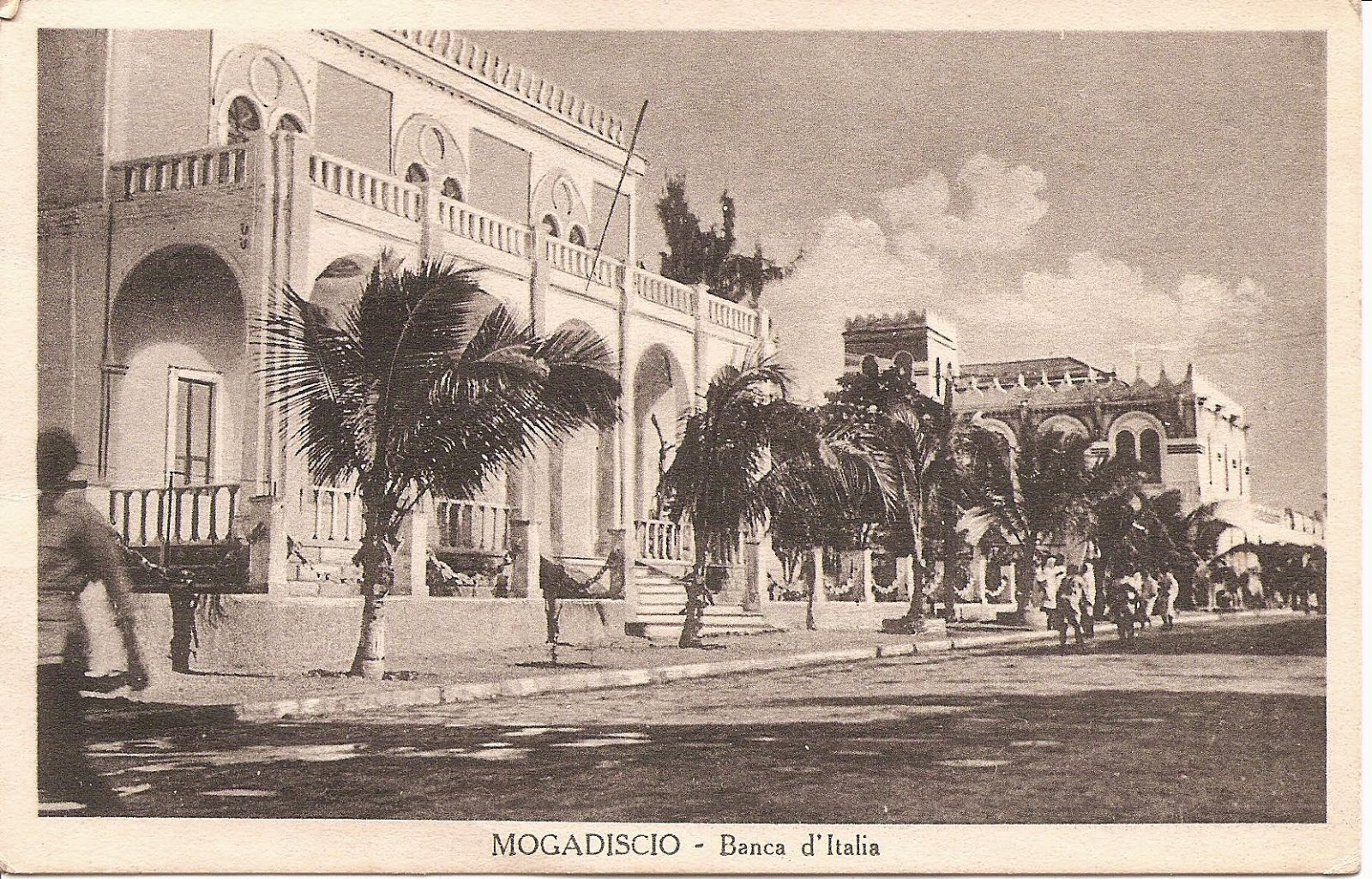
The "Bank of Italy" in 1950 Mogadishu, before being renamed "National Central Bank of Somalia" in 1960

Furthermore, on 1 July 1960, the newly independent Republic of Somalia established that the "Banca Nazionale Somala" (National Bank of Somalia) to take over the activities of the "Cassa" and the Mogadishu branch of Banca d'Italia. The new bank combined central banking activities with commercial banking activities.

During the 1950s, with UN aid money pouring in and the presence of experienced Italian administrators who had come to see the region as their home, infrastructural and educational development blossomed in the region. The decade passed relatively without incident, and was marked by positive growth in virtually all aspects of local life.

Indro Montanelli wrote in the late 1990s (when Somalia was devastated by civil war) that the ten years of Italian Trusteeship were the Golden age of Somalia: the population nearly doubled, illiteracy was reduced by 60%, malnutrition in the rural areas disappeared, the economy soared to the same level of the most developed African countries and there was complete integration in religious and social-political matters between all Somalia inhabitants.

The conditional return of Italian administration to southern Somalia gave the new trust territory several unique advantages compared with other African colonies. To the extent that Italy held the territory by UN mandate, the trusteeship provisions gave the Somalis the opportunity to gain experience in political education and self-government. These were advantages that British Somaliland, which was to be incorporated into the new Somali state, did not have.

The Italian government under ONU mandate created in the early 1950s the "National Institute of Legal, Economic and Social Studies", as a post-secondary school in Italian language for pre-university studies in order to access the Italian universities. This Institute was the precursor of the Somali National University, that was the first high level education institution in the territory of Somalia. It was established in 1954 with the name: L'Universita' Nazionale Somala.

In the Italian administered Somalia, the exports of sugar and banana reached record levels in 1959, facilitated also by the creation of the "Fiera della Somalia" (Somalia Fair) in 1952.

== Development – 1960 to 1969 ==
At independence the Somali economy – with the former British area added – was at a near subsistence level, and the new state lacked the administrative capacity to collect taxes from subsistence herders and farmers. The state could rely on the customs taxes from international trade, which were easier to collect, but tariffs failed to meet the needs of a government with ambitious development goals. Somalia therefore relied on Italian and British subsidies, which funded about 31 percent of the new nation's current budget in the first three years of independence.

Somalia also received grants and loans from countries in the East and the West, which made possible the articulation of an ambitious development plan by 1963. A five-year plan with a budget of more than US$100 million in grants and loans, it focused on investment in infrastructure. The plan's thesis was that plantation crops and livestock exports would increase if there were better roads, transportation facilities, ports, and irrigation works. Another large investment was made in the creation of model farms to attract farmers from around the country, who would learn improved techniques to apply on their own farms. Model farms in Baidoa in the Bay Region, Afgooye near Mogadishu, and Tog Wajaale, west of Hargeysa, were established during this period.

In the pastoral sector, the Livestock Development Agency, formed in 1965–66, emphasized veterinary services, the provision of water and of holding grounds for cattle while they were undergoing inoculation, and transportation. Somali pastoralists responded with enthusiasm to the prospects for wealth by entering the international market for livestock. In the early 1960s, the value and number of exported livestock approximately doubled, and livestock soon surpassed bananas as Somalia's leading export.

There were therefore some notable successes among Somalia's early development projects. The nation became nearly selfsufficient in sugar, and banana exports grew, albeit haltingly. Livestock exports increased, and investments in roads and irrigation facilities resulted in some genuine improvements.

But the 1960s also yielded great disillusionment. The country could not overcome its dependence on foreign assistance, even to meet its current budget. Moreover, imports of foreign grains increased rapidly, indicating that the agricultural sector was not meeting the needs of the growing urban population. The modern agricultural techniques of state farms had little influence on traditional farming practices. Because of a boom in livestock export from Hargeysa, cows, goats, and camels were becoming concentrated in northern Somalia, much to the detriment of rangelands. The UN Food and Agriculture Organization (FAO) foresaw the dire effects of the 1974 drought in a 1967 report that noted the severe range deterioration. Finally, and perhaps most important, many Somalis were enervated by the feeling that political incumbents, through electoral manipulations, were squandering the nation's economic resources for their private benefit.

== Scientific socialism 1970 to 1975 ==
Siad Barre legitimated his 1969 coup d'état in terms of the national economic malaise. On October 20, 1970, the first anniversary of the coup, he announced:

In our Revolution we believe that we have broken the chain of a consumer economy based on imports, and we are free to decide our destiny. And in order to realize the interests of the Somali people, their achievement of a better life, the full development of their potentialities and the fulfillment of their aspirations, we solemnly declare Somalia to be a Socialist State.

Relying on Soviet advisers and a committed group of Italian-educated Somali "leftist" intellectuals, Siad Barre announced the 1971–73 Three-Year Plan. The plan emphasized a higher standard of living for every Somali, jobs for all who sought work, and the eradication of capitalist exploitation. Agricultural "crash programs" and creation of new manufacturing plants were the immediate results.

Siad Barre quickly brought a substantial proportion of the modern economy under state control. The government nationalized banks, insurance companies, petroleum distribution firms, and the sugar-refining plant and created national agencies for construction materials and foodstuffs. Although the Somali neologism for socialism, hantiwadaag, could be translated as the "sharing of livestock," camel herds were not nationalized, and Siad Barre reassured pastoralists that hantiwadaag would not affect their animals. To mollify international business, in 1972 Siad Barre announced a liberal investment code. Because the modern economy was so small, nationalization was more showmanship than a radical change in the economy.

The creation of cooperatives soon became a cornerstone in building a socialist economy. In 1973 the government decreed the Law on Cooperative Development, with most funds going into the agricultural sector. In the precoup years, agricultural programs had received less than 10 percent of total spending. By 1974 the figure was 29.1 percent. The investment in cooperatives had limited long-term results, however. In Galole near Hargeysa, for example, a government team established a cooperative in 1973, and government funds helped purchase a tractor, a cooperative center, and a grain storage tank. Members received token salaries as well. But in July 1977, with the beginning of the Ogaden War, state involvement in Galole ended; by 1991 the cooperative was no longer in operation.

Cooperatives also aimed at the nomad, although on a smaller scale. The 1974–78 Development Plan allocated only 4.2 percent of the budgeted funds to livestock. Government officials argued that the scientific management of rangeland – the regeneration of grazing lands and the drilling of new water holes – would be possible only under socialist cooperation. In the fourteen government-established cooperatives, each family received an exclusive area of 2 to 3 km^{2} of grazing land; in times of drought, common land under reserve was to become available. The government committed itself to providing educational and health services as well as serving as a marketing outlet for excess stock. Neither agricultural nor fishing cooperatives, however, proved economically profitable.

Integrated agricultural development projects were somewhat more successful than the cooperatives. The Northwest Region Agricultural Development Project, for example, survived the 1980s. Building upon the bunding (creation of embankments to control the flow of water) done by the British in the 1950s and by the United States Agency for International Development (USAID) in the 1960s, the World Bank picked up the program in the 1970s and 1980s. Yields from bunded farms increased between 24 and 137.4 t/km^{2} over the yields from unbunded farms. However, overall improvement in agricultural production was hardly noticeable at a macroeconomic level.

Somalia's rural-based socialist programs attracted international development agencies. The Kuwait Fund for Arab Economic Development (KFAED), USAID, and the FAO participated first in the Northern Rangelands Development Project in 1977 and in the Central Rangelands Project in 1979. These projects called for rotating grazing areas, using reserves, and creating new boreholes, but the drought of 1974 and political events undid most efforts.

During 1974–75 a drought devastated the pastoral economy. Major General Husseen Kulmiye headed the National Drought Relief Committee, which sought relief aid from abroad, among other programs. By January 1975, China, the United States, the European Economic Community, the Soviet Union, Italy, Sweden, Switzerland, Sudan, Algeria, Yugoslavia, Yemen, and others had pledged 66,229 tons of grain, 1,155 tons of milk powder, and tons of other food products. Later that year, with aid from the Soviet Union, the government transported about 90,000 nomads from their hamlets to agricultural and fishing cooperatives in the south. The regime established new agricultural cooperatives at Dujuuma on the Jubba River (about 180 km^{2}), Kurtun Waareyc near the Shabelle River (about 60 km^{2}), and Sablaale northwest of Chisimayu (about 60 km^{2}). The KFAED and the World Bank supported irrigation projects in these cooperatives, in which corn, beans, peanuts, and rice were planted. Because the government provided seeds, water, management, health facilities, and schools, as well as workers' salaries, the farms were really state-owned farms rather than cooperatives. Essentially, they became havens for women and children because after the drought the men went off inland with whatever money they had accumulated to buy livestock to replenish their stock of animals.

The government also established fishing cooperatives. Despite a long coastline and an estimated potential yield of 150,000 tons per year of all species of fish, in the early 1970s fishing accounted for less than 1 percent of Somalia's gross domestic product. In 1975 cooperatives were established at Eyl, a post in the Nugaal region; Cadale, a port 1200 kilometers northeast of Mogadishu; and Baraawe. The Soviet Union supplied modern trawlers; when Soviet personnel left Somalia in 1978, Australia and Italy supported these fishing projects. Despite their potential and broad-based international support, these cooperatives failed to become profitable.

Siad Barre emphasized the great economic successes of the socialist experiment, a claim that had some truth in the first five years of the revolution. In this period, the government reorganized the sole milk-processing plant to make it more productive; established tomato-canning, wheat flour, pasta, cigarette, and match factories; opened a plant that manufactured cardboard boxes and polyethylene bags; and established several grain mills and a petroleum refinery. In addition, the state put into operation a meat-processing plant in Chisimayu, as well as a fish-processing factory in Laas Qoray northeast of Erigavo. The state worked to expand sugar operations in Giohar and to build a new sugar-processing facility in Afgooye. In three of the four leading light industries – canned meats, milk, and textiles – there were increases in output between 1969 and 1975.

Progress in the early socialist period was not uniform, however. The government heralded various programs in the transport, packaging, irrigation, drainage, fertilization, and spraying of the banana crop. Yet, despite the boom year of 1972, banana exports declined.

Barre's economic record was frequently linked to broader assessments of his government's low levels of corruption. Although many scholars of military rule in Africa argued that military regimes were often as corrupt as the civilian administrations they replaced, Somalia under Barre was frequently identified as an exception. One observed that the 1969 coup had brought to power "almost puritanical officers" who sharply reduced corruption, while a 1975 investigative hearing before a U.S. Senate subcommittee likewise identified Somalia as one of the least corrupt countries in Africa. Fiscal discipline contrasted sharply with the preceding civilian administration, where financial mismanagement was reported to be so pervasive that the government was unable to produce a complete fiscal report because of administrative irregularities. Whereas the national budget had recorded continuous deficits since independence, Barre's government achieved Somalia's first budget surplus in 1971, with the surplus subsequently allocated to development projects.

Somalia's socialist government undertook a marked expansion of the state’s capacity to collect revenue, an achievement widely seen as symbolising a break from the administrative weakness of the civilian era. Whereas the previous government had struggled to enforce taxation even in urban centers. The post 1969 government extended tax collection into rural and nomadic bush areas, reaching rural communities in the bush that had largely fallen outside the state’s fiscal reach.This institutional strengthening corresponded in a rise in tax revenue. From 1970 onward, tax revenue doubled by 1975.

== Socialist revolution post-1975 ==
Stanford-trained economist Vali Jamal estimated Somalia's GDP per capita at US$406 in 1978 (approximately US$2,000 in present-day terms), arguing that official statistics had substantially underestimated agricultural production. By his estimate, Somalia's per capita GDP exceeded that of several African countries, including Egypt, Ghana, Sudan, Tanzania, and Kenya, as well as most other states in East Africa.

This estimate was reinforced by Somalia's first official national accounts, compiled in 1979 through three independent studies conducted jointly with the Somali Central Statistical Department, two by the UN Economic Commission for Africa and one by the World Bank (IBRD). The IBRD calculated a figure of US$342, a figure that put Somalia well out of the league of the least developed countries entirely. The report further estimated that 17 percent of the population lived below the poverty threshold, describing this as comparatively low by African standards and consistent with the relative absence of urban shanty settlements and widespread visible malnutrition in Somalia at the time.

Popular enthusiasm for the revolution began to dissipate by the mid-1970s. Many officials had become corrupt, using their positions for personal gain, and a number of ideologues had been purged from the administration as potential threats to their military superiors. Perhaps most important, Siad Barre's regime was focusing its attention on the political goal of "liberating" the Ogaden (Ogaadeen) rather than on the economic goal of socialist transformation. The Somali economy was hurt as much by these factors and by the economic cost of creating a large modern army as it was by the concurrent drought. Two economic trends from this period were noteworthy: increasing debt and the collapse of the small industrial sector.

During the 1970s, foreign debt increased faster than export earnings. By the end of the decade, Somalia's debt of 4 billion shillings equaled the earnings from seventy-five years' worth of banana exports (based on 1978 data). About one-third was owed to centrally planned economies (mainly the Soviet Union, US$110 million; China, US$87.2 million; with small sums to Bulgaria and the German Democratic Republic (East Germany). Another one-third of the debt was owed to countries in the Organisation for Economic Cooperation and Development (OECD). Finally, one-third was owed to members of the Organization of the Petroleum Exporting Countries (OPEC) (principally Saudi Arabia, US$81.9 million; Abu Dhabi, US$67.0 million; the Arab Fund for Economic and Social Development, US$34.7 million; Kuwait, US$27.1 million; and smaller amounts to Iraq, Qatar, the OPEC special account, Libya, and Algeria, in that order). Many loans, especially from the Soviet Union, were, in effect, written off. Later, many loan repayments to OECD states were rescheduled. But thanks to the accumulated debt burden, by the 1980s the economy could not attract foreign capital, and virtually all international funds made available to Somalia in rescheduling agreements came with the provision that international civil servants would monitor all expenditures. As a result of its international debt, therefore, Somalia lost control over its macroeconomic structure.

A second ominous trend in the 1975–81 period was the decline of the manufacturing sector. Exports of manufactured goods were negligible when the 1969 coup occurred; by the mid-1970s, manufactured goods constituted 20 percent of total exports. By 1978, as a consequence of the Ogaden War, such exports were almost nonexistent. Production likewise suffered. In 1969 Somalia refined 47,000 tons of sugar; by 1980 the figure was 29,100 tons (all figures are for fiscal year. In 1975 the country produced 14.4 million cans of meat and 2,220 tons of canned fish. In 1979 it produced 1.5 million cans of meat and a negligible amount of canned fish. Textile output rose over the period. The only material produced, however, was a coarse fabric sold to rural people (and worn by the president) at less than cost. In milk, pasta, packaging materials, cigarettes, and matches, the trend was downward in the second half of the 1970s.

During the late 1970s and early 1980s, the economy of Somalia was heavily dependent on trade, with the Somali GDP being made up of 55% exports and imports. Livestock and bananas were the primary export of Somalia during this time and made up roughly 90% of all export earnings. Scientific socialism hurt this sector, because the Somali government nationalized every other economic activity except livestock and bananas, which were kept privatized. The Somali government was also putting heavy tariffs on exports to gain money, making 65% of their trade revenue from tariffs in the 1970s, whereas the world average was only 6–7%. Bananas specifically were in a decline from this taxation in the early 1980s, so, in 1983, the Somali government formed a joint-venture with an Italian corporation and named it Somalfruit. Somalfruit had an overall very positive effect on the banana sector, making big strides in marketing, shipping facilities, higher producer pricing, and increased input availability. In 1980, the Somali production of bananas was roughly 60,000 tons, whereas in 1987, the production of bananas jumped to 108,000 tons. The export of bananas also followed a similar trend, where in 1980 there were roughly 43,000 tons of bananas exported and in 1987 there were roughly 64,000 tons of bananas exported. Additionally, in 1980 there were US$6 million in exports from bananas, whereas in 1987, that number increased to US$20.5 million. This banana boom greatly helped the economy stay afloat and Somalfruit was a very big part of that.

== From scientific socialism to "IMF-ism" 1981–1990 ==
Its socialist program in disarray and its alliance with the Soviet Union lost in the wake of the 1977–78 Ogaden War, Somalia once again turned to the West. Like most countries devastated by debt in the late 1970s, Somalia could rely only on the nostrums of the IMF and its program of structural adjustment.

In February 1980, a standby macroeconomic policy agreement with the IMF was signed, but not implemented. The standby agreements of July 1981 and July 1982 were completed in July 1982 and January 1984, respectively. To meet IMF standards, the government terminated its policy of acting as the last-resort employer of all secondary school graduates and abolished its monopoly on grain marketing. The government then prepared a medium-term recovery program consisting of a public investment program for 1984–86 and a phased program of policy reforms. Because the International Development Association (IDA) considered this program too ambitious, the government scaled down its projects, most notably the construction of the Baardheere Dam, which AID had advised against. The government abandoned its first reform program in 1984. In March 1984, the government signed a letter of intent accepting the terms of a new US$183 million IMF extended credit facility to run for three years. In a Somali Council of Ministers meeting in April, however, this agreement was canceled by one vote, as the soldier-ministers chafed at the proposed 60 percent cut in the military budget. The agreement also called for a further devaluation of the shilling and reductions in government personnel.

A new crisis hit Somalia in June 1983. The Saudi Arabian government decided to stop importing Somali cattle, and this ban soon was expanded to include sheep and goats. Saudi officials claimed that rinderpest had been detected in Somali livestock, making them unsafe. Cynics pointed out that Saudi businessmen recently had invested in Australian ranches and were seeking to carve out an export market for their product. In any event, the ban created a large budget deficit, and arrears on debt service started to accumulate. A major obstacle to expanding livestock and other exports was Somalia's lack of communications infrastructure: good roads and shipping facilities as well as effective telecommunications and postal services. Lack of banking facilities also posed a problem. Somalia could not easily avoid the medicine of structural adjustment.

In March 1985, in negotiations with the Paris Club (the informal name for a consortium of eighteen Western creditor countries), Somalia's debt service schedule was restructured, and the government adopted a reform program that included a devaluation and the establishment of a free market for foreign exchange for most private transactions. In November 1985, in conjunction with the Consultative Group of Aid Donors, a technical body of the Paris Club, the government presented its National Development Strategy and Programme with a revised three-year investment program. Western aid officials criticized this program as too ambitious. In June 1986, the government negotiated an agricultural sector adjustment program with IDA. In September 1986, a foreign exchange auction system was initiated, but its operation encountered severe difficulties because to its complete dependence on external aid. Many exchange rates applicable to different types of transactions consequently came into existence.

AID prepared a second-stage project report in 1986 that renewed the call for privatization. It praised the government for permitting the free importation of petroleum products, but chided the Somalis for not yet allowing the free marketing of hides and skins. AID put great pressure on the government, especially by means of lobbyists, to take action on legislation to permit private banking. To encourage the private sector further, AID was prepared to fund the Somali Chamber of Commerce if the Somali government would allow it to become an independent body. The 1986 report went beyond privatization by calling for means of improving the government's revenue collection and budgetary control systems. Building a government capable of collecting taxes, making policy reforms, and addressing fiscal problems became the new focus. Along these lines, AID encouraged the elimination of civil service jobs. As of in 1985, although 5,000 civil servants had been dismissed AID felt that 80 percent of the civil service was still redundant. AID officials, however, urged pay raises for those in useful jobs.

Somalia's Five-Year Plan for 1987-91 largely reflected the international pressures and incentives of the IMF and AID. Privatization was written into the plan, as were development projects that were smaller in scale and more easily implemented. By 1988 the government had announced implementation of many IMF and AID-encouraged structural adjustment policies. In regard to foreign exchange, the government had taken many intermediate steps that would lead to the merger of the pegged and market rates. As for banking, legislation had been enacted allowing private banks to operate. In public finance, the government had reduced its deficit from 10 to 7 percent of GDP, as had been advised, but acknowledged that the increased taxes on fuel, rent, and sales had been only partially implemented. A value-added tax on fuel imports remained under consideration, but the tax on rental income had been increased and the sales tax raised from 5 to 10 percent. The government continued to procrastinate concerning public enterprises, holding only informal discussion of plans to liquidate unprofitable enterprises.

With the devaluation of the shilling, the real cost of foreign grain became apparent to consumers, and the relative price of domestic grain rose. Rectifying prices induced a 13.5 percent increase in agricultural output between 1983 and 1985. Inflation was tamed as well, falling from an annual rate of 59 percent in 1980 to 36 percent in 1986. World Bank officials used these data to publicize the Somali success in structural adjustment.

The overall picture was not that encouraging, however. Manufacturing output declined, registering a drop of 0.5 percent per annum from 1980 to 1987. Exports decreased by 16.3 percent per annum from 1979 to 1986. Moreover, the 0.8 percent rise in GDP per annum from 1979 to 1986 did not keep up with population growth. World Bank estimates put Somalia's 1989 GNP at US$1,035 million, or US$170 per person, and further estimated that between 1980 and 1989 real GNP per person had declined at 1.7 percent per year.

In the period from 1987 to 1989, the economic results of agricultural production were mixed. Although corn, sorghum, and sugarcane were principal crops, livestock and bananas remained major exports. The value of livestock and banana exports in 1989 (the latest year for which data were available in May 1992) was US$26 million and US$25 million, respectively. Livestock, consisting primarily of camels, cattle, goats, and sheep, served several purposes. The animals provided milk and meat for domestic consumption, and livestock, hides, and skins for export.

As a result of the civil war in many areas, the economy deteriorated rapidly in 1989 and 1990. Previously, livestock exports from northern Somalia represented nearly 80 percent of foreign currency earned, but these exports came to a virtual halt in 1989. Shortages of most commodities, including food, fuel, medicines, and water, occurred virtually countrywide. Following the fall of the Siad Barre regime in late January 1991, the situation failed to improve because clan warfare intensified.

== See also ==
- Economy of Somalia
