= National symbols of Somalia =

During its modern history, various national symbols have come to represent Somalia. Due to the country's instability, many of these are only used in areas under the Federal Government of Somalia, and may not apply to breakaway regions such as Somaliland.

The Constitution of Somalia mentions three symbols: the flag, the coat of arms and the national anthem.

== Flag ==
Flag of Somalia

The flag of Somalia consists of a single white five-pointed star on a cyan field representing the five regions in which Somalis reside (at the time: British Somaliland, Italian Somaliland, French Somaliland, Ogaden, and the Northern Frontier District of Kenya), making it also the ethnic flag of the Somali people. Designed by Mohammed Awale Liban in preparation for independence, it was first adopted by the Trust Territory of Somaliland on October 12, 1954.

== Coat of arms ==
Coat of arms of Somalia

The coat of arms of Somalia depicts the flag on a golden shield, supported by two natural leopards standing on spears. It was adopted on October 10, 1956.

== National anthem ==
National anthem of Somalia

The national anthem, Qolobaa Calankeed ("Every nation has its own flag"), was adopted on August 1, 2012 with the new Constitution of Somalia. Composed by Abdullahi Qarshe in 1959, it replaced Soomaaliyeey toosoo ("Somalis, wake up"), which had been in use since 2000.

== Fauna and flora ==
The national animal of Somalia is the leopard (Panthera pardus), while its national bird is the superb starling (Lamprotornis superbus). Its national plant is the king protea (Protea cynaroides). However, none of them are directly mentioned in the Constitution.
