= Afar =

Afar may refer to:

== Peoples and languages ==
- Afar language, an East Cushitic language
- Afar people, an ethnic group of Djibouti, Eritrea, and Ethiopia

== Places ==
=== Horn of Africa ===
- Afar Desert or Danakil Desert, a desert in Ethiopia
- Afar Region, a regional state of Ethiopia
- Afar Triangle or Afar Depression, a geological feature in East Africa
- Afar triple junction, a geological rift system which divides the Nubian, Somalian, and Arabian plates
- French Territory of the Afars and the Issas, a former French colony (now Djibouti)

=== Iraq ===
- Tal Afar, in Iraq
- Tel Afar District, region in Iraq

== Arts, entertainment, and media ==
- Afar (album), a synthpop album by Ice Choir
- Afar (magazine), a publication focused on experiential travel
- Afar, a Combo Rangers character

== Organizations ==
- Afar Liberation Front, a former Ethiopian militant group
- Afar National Democratic Party, a former Ethiopian political party
- Afar Revolutionary Democratic Unity Front, an Ethiopian political party
- American Federation for Aging Research, or AFAR, a private charitable organization
