= List of ecoregions in Somalia =

The following is a list of ecoregions in Somalia, as identified by the Worldwide Fund for Nature (WWF).

== Terrestrial ecoregions ==
by major habitat type

=== Tropical and subtropical moist broadleaf forests ===
- Northern Zanzibar–Inhambane coastal forest mosaic

=== Tropical and subtropical grasslands, savannas, and shrublands ===
- Somali Acacia–Commiphora bushlands and thickets

=== Deserts and xeric shrublands ===
- Ethiopian xeric grasslands and shrublands
- Hobyo grasslands and shrublands
- Somali montane xeric woodlands

=== Mangroves ===
- East African mangroves
