= Hussein Mohamud Sheikh Hussein =

Somali politician

Hussein Mohamud Sheikh Hussein حسين محمود شيخ حسين

Minister of Constitutional Affairs
- In office 6 February 2015 – 29 March 2017
- President: Hassan Sheikh Mohamud
- Prime Minister: Omar Abdirashid Ali Sharmarke
- Succeeded by: Abdirahman Hoosh Jibril

Personal details
- Born: Somalia
- Party: Independent

Hussein Mohamud Sheikh Hussein (Somali: Xuseen Maxamud Sheekh Xuseen, Arabic: حسين محمود شيخ حسين) is a Somali politician. He is the former Minister of Constitutional Affairs of Somalia, having been appointed to the position on 6 February 2015 by former Prime Minister Omar Abdirashid Ali Sharmarke.

He was Former Deputy Prime Minister, Minister of Agriculture and Livestock, FGS. 2012 by Prime Minister Abdiweli Maxamed Ali Gaas.
