= Somali =

Somali may refer to:

== Horn of Africa ==
- Somali Peninsula, anothr name of the Horn of Africa
- Somalia, country of Africa
- Somaliland, country of Africa
- Somali Democratic Republic
- Somalis, an inhabitant or ethnicity associated with Greater Somali Region
- Somali language, a Cushitic language
- Somali languages, group of Cushitic language
- Somali, plural of Somalo, former Somali currency

== Other uses ==
- Somali, a member of the Somalia Battalion, a pro-Russian military group
- HMS Somali (F33), a British destroyer
- Somali cat, a cat breed
- Somali, a character in the manga series Somali and the Forest Spirit
- Johnny Somali (born 2000), American former livestreamer known for filming himself cause trouble in foreign countries

== See also ==
- Proto-Somali, an ancient people
- Somari, 1994 unlicensed video game
