= 2020 in Somalia =

- Decades: 2000s; 2010s; 2020s
- See also: History of Somalia; List of years in Somalia

Events in the year 2020 in Somalia.

== Incumbents ==
- President: Mohamed Abdullahi Mohamed
- Prime Minister: Hassan Ali Khaire

== Events ==
Ongoing – Somali Civil War (2009–present)

(2020 timeline of the Somali Civil War); COVID-19 pandemic in Somalia

=== January ===
- 18 January – 2020 Afgooye bombing: A suicide car bombing in Afgooye kills 4 and injured 20; most victims are police guarding Turkish contractors. Responsibility is claimed by al-Shabaab.
- 28 January – Jubaland security minister Abdirashid Hassan Abdinur “Janan” escapes detention in Mogadishu.

=== February ===
- 2 February – A U.S. airstrike near Jilib kills a civilian and injures three more while targeting an al-Shabab member.
- 16 February – Journalist Abdiwali Ali Hassan is shot dead in Afgooye after receiving multiple threats.

=== March ===
- 7 March – Journalist Mohamed Abdiwahab Nur “Abuja” is arrested by NISA in Mogadishu; he is held incommunicado for three months.
- 10 March – An attack on a minibus near Janaale, Lower Shabelle kills five men and a child.
- 15 March – Somalia receives 300,000 doses of Oxford–AstraZeneca vaccines from the COVAX Facility for frontline workers and elderly people with chronic health conditions.
- 16 March – Somalia confirms its first COVID-19 case, announced by Health Minister Fawziya Abikar.
- 17 March – Somali authorities order all schools in the country closed for 15 days to prevent the virus spread.

=== April ===
- 6 April – Two Somali National Army officers rape a woman and a girl during the takeover of Janaale.

=== May ===
- 4 May – Ethiopian National Defense Force soldiers at the Bardelle airstrip in Baidoa shot down an African Express Airways Embraer EMB 120 Brasilia aircraft carrying coronavirus aid, after mistaking it for a suicide attack.
- 24 May – Baidoa Eid bombing: A bombing targets an Eid al-Fitr festival at an IDP camp on the southwestern outskirts of Baidoa, killing 5–7 people and injuring 20+.
- 27 May – Seven health workers are abducted and killed by masked gunmen in Gololey, Balcad District.

=== July ===
- 29 July – The Benadir regional court sentences editor Abdiaziz Ahmed Gurbiye to six months’ imprisonment and a fine on baseless charges.

=== August ===
- 8 August
  - The Al-Shabaab militant group claims responsibility for a suicide bombing on a military base in Mogadishu that kills eight and injures fourteen.
  - The Law on Sexual Intercourse Related Crimes is introduced in the Federal Parliament of Somalia, which allows for forced marriage and for girls who reach puberty to be married.
- 16 August – Harakat al-Shabaab al-Mujahideen militants attack the Elite Hotel in Lido Beach, Mogadishu, killing eleven people.
- 18 August – Two soldiers are executed after being convicted for raping a 10-year-old boy in July.

=== September ===
- 7 September – Three Somali special forces soldiers are killed and a U.S. soldier and a Somali soldier are injured by a car bomb in Jana Cabdalle, Jubbaland.
- 17 September: President Mohamed Abdullahi Mohamed appoints Mohamed Hussein Roble as prime minister, replacing Hassan Ali Khaire who was voted out in July. He further announces that the parliamentary elections later in the year would not be held under a one person, one vote system.

=== December ===
- 1–27 December: Scheduled dates for the 2020 Somali parliamentary election.
- 10 December – U.S. warplanes bomb a stronghold of al-Qaida-linked al-Shabaab rebels.
- 15 December – Somalia cuts diplomatic ties with Kenya after Muse Bihi Abdi, president of Somaliland visits Kenya.
- 18 December – 2020 Galkayo bombing: A suicide bombing at Galkayo’s Abdullahi Isse stadium kills 17, including four military commanders, and injures 20.
- 21 December – The United States sends the USS Makin Island and other warships with 2,500 marines to cover the withdrawal of its 800 troops, leaving only a small contingent to guard the embassy.

== Deaths ==
- 24 March – Mohamed Farah, footballer (b. 1961).
- 1 April – Nur Hassan Hussein, politician, former Prime Minister (b. 1938).
- 7 April – Hudeydi, oud player (b. 1928).
- 10 May – Abdikani Mohamed Wa'ays, diplomat (ambassador to Egypt and the Arab League); died of COVID-19 in Kuwait
- 12 July – Hassan Abshir Farah, politician, former Prime Minister (b. 1945).
- 8 October – Ali Khalif Galaydh, 78, politician, Prime Minister (2000–2001), MP (since 2012) and President of Khatumo State (since 2014).
- 18 November – Umar Ghalib, 90, politician, Prime Minister (1991–1993) and Minister of Foreign Affairs (1969–1976).

== See also ==
- 2020 in Somaliland
- 2020 in East Africa
- COVID-19 pandemic in Africa
- Al-Shabaab (militant group)
