= 2021 in Somalia =

- Decades: 2000s; 2010s; 2020s
- See also: History of Somalia; List of years in Somalia

Events in the year 2021 in Somalia.

== Incumbents ==
- President: Mohamed Abdullahi Farmajo
- Prime Minister: Mohamed Hussein Roble
- Speaker of the Senate: Abdi Hashi Abdullahi (until 10 August) Mohamed Ali Yusuf (since 11 August)

== Events ==
Ongoing – Somali Civil War (2009–present); COVID-19 pandemic in Somalia

=== January ===
- January 2
  - Five people, including two Turks, are killed in a suicide bombing near Mogadishu by al-Shabaab.
  - The United States conducts two airstrikes on al-Shabaab.
- January 7 – Five suspected al-Shabaab insurgents are killed by a United States airstrike near Saaxa Weyne.
- January 19 – U.S. Africa Command receives a report from an online media source claiming one civilian was killed from a U.S. airstrike in the vicinity of Jamaame.
- January 31
  - Eight children are killed and dozens are wounded by a bomb explosion in Golweyn, Lower Shabelle. In a separate incident, four al-Shabaab jihadists kill five people and wound ten civilians at Afrik Hotel in Mogadishu.
  - Although most U.S. troops have withdrawn, some United States and Somali troops worked together in a training exercise.

=== February ===
- February 2 – Mohamed convenes a three-day meeting in Dusmareb with federal state leaders to discuss the elections. The talks fail with both sides placing blame on the other for the breakdown because of lack of concessions.
- February 6
  - No agreement is reached on the organization of the February 8 election, threatening a constitutional crisis.
  - A roadside bombing attributed to al-Shabaab kills 13 security forces in Dusmareb District, Galguduud, shortly after the breakdown in talks about the election were announced.
- February 8 – President Mohamed Abdullahi Mohamed breaks his term limit as president, with no plan of an upcoming election.
- February 13 – A car bomb near the Federal Parliament building kills three people and injures eight others.
- February 19 – Gunfire is widely reported in Mogadishu. Five soldiers are killed and dozen civilians are wounded.
- February 21 – The government blames the United Arab Republic for the violence of February 19 and demands an apology.

=== March ===
- March 5 – March 2021 Mogadishu bombing: 20 people are killed and 30 others wounded in a suicide car bombing outside of a restaurant.
- March 8 – Zahra Mohamed Ahmad, human rights activist and lawyer, is awarded the International Women of Courage Award.

=== April ===
- April 3 – At least six people, including a minor, are killed in a suicide attack in a restaurant in Mogadishu.
- April 8 – Efforts to resolve election disputes collapse after states leaders from Puntland and Jubbaland fail to agree on the way forward primarily due to lack of trust.
- April 12 or 14 – The President of Somalia Mohamed Abdullahi Mohamed signs a Special Electoral Law which extends his term as president for two more years. This is opposed by opposition leaders which called it "a threat to the stability, peace and unity" and by the international community.
- April 25
  - Start of the 2021 Mogadishu mutiny.
  - Rebel soldiers, mainly from Hirshabelle, enter Mogadishu. The rebels seize the northern part of the city, clashing with pro-government forces in some neighborhoods. Pro-government soldiers attack homes of the former Somali president and opposition leader. By the end of the day, government forces withdraw towards Villa Somalia.
- April 27 – The states of Hirshabelle and Galmudug announce that they are against an extension of President Mohamed's term, calling for a return to the election talks.
- April 29 – President Mohamed asks PM Roble to resign, who refuses.

=== May ===
- May – Somali political leaders announce plans to commence a multi-stage election process within 60 days to help ease the political tensions within the nation.
- May 6
  - End of the 2021 Mogadishu mutiny.
  - The rebel soldiers agreed to withdraw from Mogadishu after series of talks with the Prime Minister, held by the opposition. The Somali Police Force are set to retake control of the city.
- May 8 – Roads reopen and rebels withdraw from Mogadishu in vehicles towards Lower Shabelle and Middle Shabelle.
- May 27
  - Somali political leaders give the responsibility of organising the indirect elections to the National Consultative Council (NCC) made up of the prime ministers FMS leaders.
  - An agreement is signed by Somali officials ensuring that a minimum 30 per cent quota is reserved for women members of Parliament through a clear mechanism.

=== June ===
- June 8 – The United Nations Human Rights Council alleges Somali recruits were trained in Eritrea to fight in the Tigray War. This would constitute as illegally participating in a foreign war.
- June 15 – A suicide bombing occurs in Mogadishu at the General Dhegobadan Military Camp, killing 15 Somali Army recruits.

=== July ===
- July 22 – Irish Minister for Foreign Affairs, Simon Coveney, visits Mogadishu and holds talks with the Prime Minister (Mohamed Hussein Roble), Minister for Foreign Affairs (Mohamed Abdirizak), and Minister for Defence (Hassan Hussein Haji). The meetings focused on the countries security situation, elections, and the participation of women in those elections.
- July 25 – Elections for the Upper House are set to take place, lasting four days until July 29. This, however, is delayed some states until November due to various problems.

=== August ===
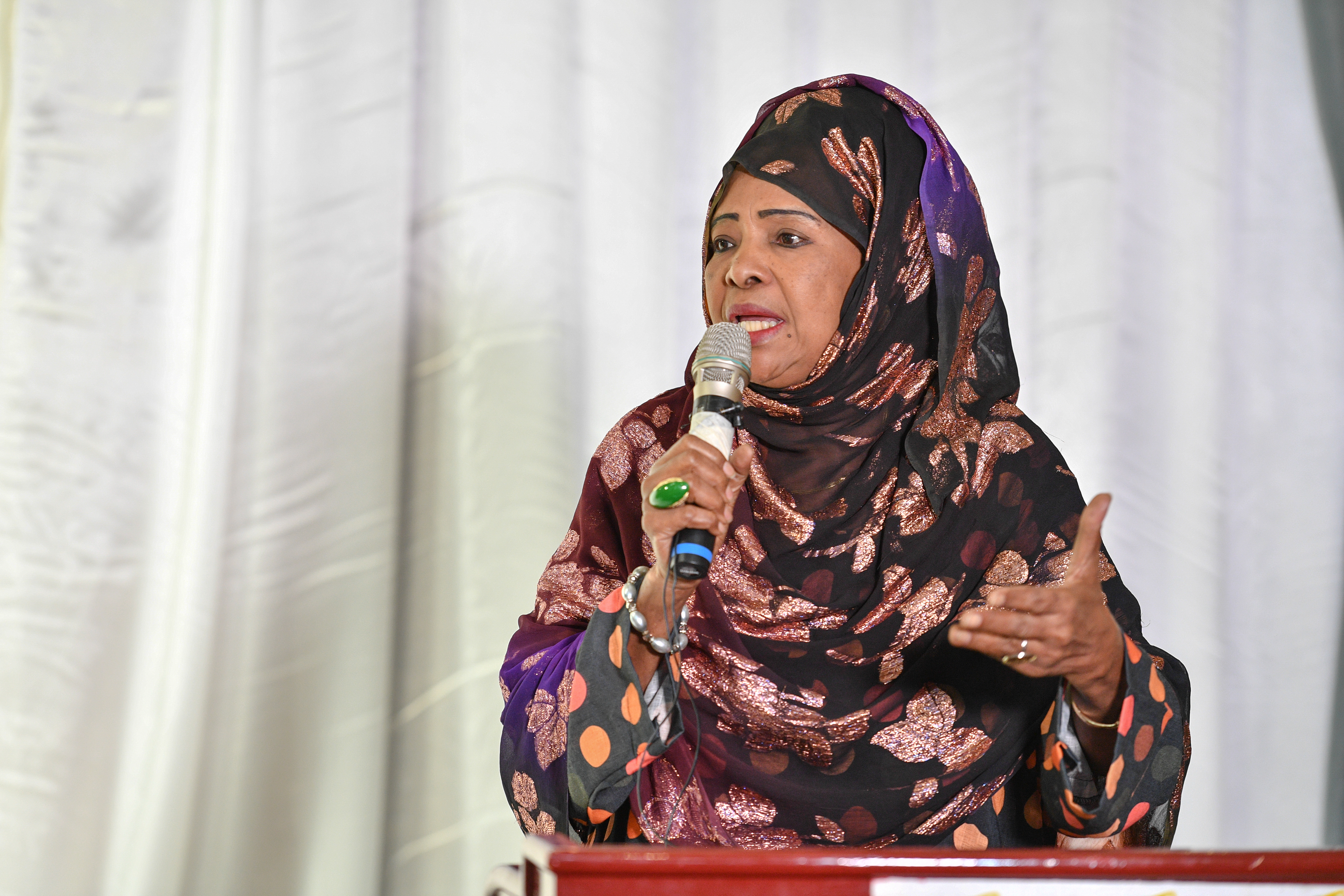
Batula Ahmed Gaballe, chairperson of Somali National Women's Organisation, speaks during the closing of the women's political representation forum organised by the office of Political Affairs of the African Union Mission in Somalia (AMISOM), in Mogadishu, Somalia on 25 August 2021.

- August 7 – President Mohamed issues a decree banning Somali government institutions from entering into agreements with foreign countries. PM Roble publicly disagrees with the President on this ban, especially with the expected arrival of a Kenyan diplomat tomorrow, calling the decision unconstitutional. The rift is resolved within four days.
- August 8 – Kenyan Foreign Affairs Minister Raychelle Omamo visits Mogadishu on a diplomatic mission, meeting with her Somali counterpart Mohamed Abdirizak, and later with PM Roble.
- August 10
  - Ugandan AMISOM soldiers are ambushed by al-Shabab near Golweyn in Lower Shabelle, killing one UPDF soldier and injuring two. The following gunfight allegedly kills seven, possibly civilians.
  - PM Roble arrives in Kenya at the Mombasa State House to hold talks with Kenyan President Uhuru Kenyatta on his diplomatic mission to the country.
  - Elections for the Lower House (House of the People) are set to begin, and to end on September 10.

=== September ===
- September – President Mohamed and PM Roble are in dispute over the murder investigation of Ikran Tahlil Farah, after Roble suspended the director of the National Intelligence and Security Agency (NISA) Fahad Yasin and Mohamed overturned his decision, declaring it unconstitutional.
- September 7 – Kenya officially opens a liaison office within Somaliland, a northern breakaway region within the country Somalia does not recognize.
- September 10 – Elections for the Lower House (House of the People) of Parliament does not end like it was supposed to today, as not all 275 MP's have yet to be elected. A new deadline to start is set for November 1.

=== October ===
- October – President Mohammed and PM Roble issue a unified call for the glacial election process to accelerate.
- October 10
  - There is an explosion central Kismayo. No casualties are reported but security tightens in the region.
  - The presidential election supposed to take place today does not happen, and is rescheduled.

=== November ===
- November 1 – Parliamentary elections begin. The Upper House elections are scheduled to conclude on November 11 and the Lower House on December 24.
- November 11 – Elections for the Upper House conclude in all states and are made official at a National Consultative Council (NCC) meeting.
- November 18 – The United Kingdom announces that it will not recognize Somaliland as an independent state unless Somaliland, Somalia, and other African nations deliberate first.
- November 25 – November 2021 Mogadishu bombing: At least eight people are killed and 17 injured, including schoolchildren, in a car bombing in Mogadishu.

=== December ===
- December 15 – President of the South West State Abdiaziz Laftagareen visits Kismayo. While no official reasons were released for the visit, reports suggest the visit is based on issues regarding parliamentary elections and to discuss the strengthening relations between the two states.
- December 24 – The elections for the Lower House, which were supposed to conclude today as thought on November 1, have only elected 24 of the 275 representatives needed to hold a presidential election. A new deadline is not set on this date.
- December 26 – President Mohammed withdraws the prime minister's mandate to organise a presidential vote and called for the creation of a new committee to "correct" the shortcomings. PM Roble accuses the president of sabotaging the electoral process.
- December 27 – Prime Minister Mohammed Hussein Roble is officially suspended by the president amid accusations that he interfered with an investigation into a scandal involving army-owned land. Roble has calls President Mohammed's plan to suspend him a coup attempt.
- December 28 – Hundreds of troops loyal to PM Roble camp near the Villa Somalia residence of his political rival President Mohammed.

== Deaths ==
- January 31 – Mohamed Nur Galal, 80, soldier (general during Ogaden War); killed during terrorist attack.
- March 10 – Ali Mahdi Muhammad, 82, former President of Somalia (1991–1997); COVID-19.
- May 20 – Abdisamad Ali Shire a former vice President of Puntland died in Mogadishu and has been buried in the Puntland capital of Garoowe.

== See also ==
- COVID-19 pandemic in Africa
- Al-Shabaab (militant group)
- 2021 in Somaliland
- 2021 in East Africa
- Tigray War
- Common Market for Eastern and Southern Africa
