= 2019 in Somalia =

- Decades: 1990s; 2000s; 2010s; 2020s
- See also: History of Somalia; List of years in Somalia

Events in the year 2019 in Somalia.

== Incumbents ==
- President: Mohamed Abdullahi Mohamed (since 16 February 2017)
- Prime Minister: Hassan Ali Khaire (since 1 March 2017)

== Events ==
- Somali Civil War (2009–present)

=== February ===
- 4 February – A bombing at a shopping mall in Mogadishu kills 11 people
- 7 February – 2019 Somali First Division season begins
- 23 February – Two al-Shabab militants and two civilians were killed in an AFRICON airstrike near Kunyo Barrow.
- 28 February – A bombing near the Maka al-Mukarama hotel in Mogadishu kills over 30 people

=== July ===
- 12 July – Asasey Hotel attack
- 24 July – A bombing at a municipal government office in Mogadishu kills seven people, including the mayor

=== August ===
- 19–31 August – Somalia at the 2019 African Games

=== December ===
- 7 December – Cyclone Pawan makes landfall at Bosaso
- 28 December – A bombing at the Ex-Control Afgoye police checkpoint in Mogadishu kills 85 people

== Deaths ==
- 12 July – Hodan Nalayeh (born 1969), media executive, Asasey Hotel attack
- 1 August – Abdirahman Omar Osman, (born 1965), Minister of Commerce and Industry (2015–2017) and Mayor of Mogadishu (since 2018), bombing
- 20 November – Almaas Elman, peace and human rights activist, shot

== See also ==
- 2019 in Somaliland
