= 2019 Mogadishu bombing =

2019 Mogadishu bombing may refer to:

- 4 February 2019 Mogadishu bombing
- 28 February 2019 Mogadishu bombings
- 22 July 2019 Mogadishu bombing
- 24 July 2019 Mogadishu bombing
- December 2019 Mogadishu bombing
