= 2020 timeline of the Somali Civil War =

This is a 2020 timeline of events in the Somali Civil War (2009–present).

== January ==
- 18 January 2020 – A suicide car bombing killed four and injured at least 20 others in Afgooye, approximately 30 kilometres (19 mi) from the Somali capital, Mogadishu.

== August ==
- 8 August 2020 – A suicide car bombing at the gates of the 12th April Army Brigade military base close to the recently reopened Mogadishu sports stadium in the Warta Nabadda district of Mogadishu. 8 soldiers were killed.

== December ==
- 18 December 2020 – A suicide bombing committed by al-Shabaab in the city of Galkayo, Somalia. The Bombing killed 17 including four high ranking military commanders.

== See also ==
- Somali Civil War (2009–present)
