= 2023 in Somalia =

- Decades: 2000s; 2010s; 2020s
- See also: History of Somalia; List of years in Somalia

Events in the year 2023 in Somalia.

== Incumbents ==
- President: Hassan Sheikh Mohamud
- Prime Minister: Hamza Abdi Barre
- Speaker of the House: Abdi Hashi Abdullahi

== Events ==
=== Ongoing ===
- Somali Civil War (timeline)
- COVID-19 pandemic in Somalia (timeline)
- Constitutional crisis in Somalia
- Controversies of Hassan Sheikh Mohamud
- Al-Shabaab insurgency in Southern Somalia

=== January ===
- 4 January – Mahas bombings: 35 people are killed and many others wounded by al-Shabaab jihadists in a double car bombing in Mahas District, Hiran.
- 6 January
  - Al-Shabaab gunmen storm a village in Hirshabelle State, killing at least six people. The village was captured from al-Shabab the previous week.
  - At least 20 people are killed and many more injured during an ambush by al-Shabaab insurgents at a government base at the Hilowle Gaab village.
- 16 January
  - The Somali Armed Forces claim it recaptured the port town of Harardhere from Al-Shabaab militants.
  - According to a Puntland officer, Somali forces allied with regional militias also took the town of El Dhere.
- 17 January – Seven soldiers, including a commander, are killed when al-Shabaab terrorists attack a base in Hawadley with a suicide car bomb and gunmen.
- 22 January – Five civilians and six al-Shabaab terrorists were killed during a siege of a compound housing the Mogadishu's mayor's office and other local government facilities.
- 26 January – A U.S. military raid in northern Somalia kills senior Islamic State member Bilal al-Sudani and ten other insurgents. No U.S. military casualties are reported in the operation, which was ordered by U.S. President Joe Biden.

=== March ===
- 21 March – The Somali National Army and pro-government militants kill 30 al-Shabaab jihadists and injure many others while defending a military base in the south of the country.

=== May ===
- 2 May – Somali forces kill 67 al-Shabaab militants and seize many weapons in a continuation of offensives against the group in the Mudug region.
- 25 May – Puntland's 2023 municipal elections occurred on Thursday, marking the second instance of one-person, one-vote elections in the autonomous state. A historic victory was achieved, with 30 districts conducting peaceful elections.
- 26 May – Fifty-four Ugandan soldiers are killed after Al-Shabaab gunmen storm an AMISOM base in Bulomarer.
- 28 May – Somalia announces that beginning next year, the country will change to a presidential system and elect officials by direct vote, ending more than three decades of indirect voting where lawmakers elected the country's leaders with the approval of clan and elderly leaders.

=== June ===
- 10 June
  - 2023 Mogadishu hotel attack: Six civilians and three soldiers are killed and ten others are injured by al-Shabaab at a hotel in Lido Beach, Mogadishu. All seven attackers are also killed.
  - At least 27 people died, most children, and 53 were injured after remnants of an old bomb exploded in the Murale village in the Janaale area of the eastern Lower Shabelle region.
- 20 June
  - Brig-Gen Mohydin is appointed as the Chief of the defense force Somali National Army (SNA), replacing Maj- Gen Odowa Yusuf Rage.
  - At least 26 people died, 16 of them soldiers, and 30 others wounded after heavy fighting broke out in Puntland. This is after the Puntland parliament voted for a one-man-one vote election with multiple political parties.

=== July ===
- 13 July – Four people are killed in Jubaland, Somalia, as al-Shabaab is confirmed as having captured a military base in the area which had been handed to Somalia by the Kenyan military on June 29.

=== August ===
- 1 August – Nasra Ali Abukar, 18, a Somali female university student known for her participation in the 100-meter race at the XXXI FISU World University Games in Chengdu, China, where she came last. Her remarkably poor result and perceived lack of athleticism caused international outrage and accusations of nepotism when she was found out to have family ties with the chair of the Somali Athletics Committee.
- 11 August – Twenty soldiers including the leader of the Rapid Response Unit (RRU) were killed and several others injured after a war broke out between Somaliland forces and the Gacan Libah paramilitary forces in the northwestern region.

=== September ===
- 23 September – 2023 Beledweyne bombing: At least 20 people are killed in a suicide car bombing at a checkpoint in Beledweyne, Hiran.

=== November ===
- 6 November – At least 53 people in Somalia are killed during floods caused by significant rainfall. Thousands of homes, bridges and roads are destroyed and over half a million are displaced.

=== December ===
- 1 December
  - Somalia becomes an official member state of the East African Community.
  - The United Nation Security Council unanimously votes to remove the arms embargo on the Somalian government and military.
- 22 December – A dhow trading vessel is seized by heavily armed pirates near the town of Eyl off the coast of Puntland, the United Kingdom Maritime Trade Operations reports, citing military authorities.
- 27 December – Several artillery shells struck neighborhoods in Mogadishu, notably impacting the Bondhere District, resulting in casualties, an elderly woman lost her life as one of the mortars hit her residence while she was in prayer after the Fajr morning prayer.

== Deaths ==
- 26 January – Bilal al-Sudani, terrorist, military raid.
- 5 April – Ismail Mahmud Hurre, 80, politician, minister of foreign affairs (2000–2002, 2006–2007).
- 16 August – Abwan Jama Kadiye, 73, poet and writer, mortar shelling.
- 20 December — Khadijo Mohamed Diriye, 74, politician, from 2001 to 2023. Minister of Women and Human Rights (twice), Minister of Youth and Sports, Minister of Humanitarianism.

== See also ==
- 2023 in Somaliland
- COVID-19 pandemic in Africa
