= 2016 in Somalia =

- Decades: 1990s; 2000s; 2010s; 2020s
- See also: History of Somalia; List of years in Somalia

The following lists events that happened during 2016 in Somalia.

== Incumbents ==
- Hassan Sheikh Mohamud, President, 2012–2017
- Omar Abdirashid Ali Sharmarke, Prime Minister, 2014–2017

== Events ==
- Somali Civil War (2009–present)
- Somalia cut ties with Iran on 7 January following the execution of Shia Sheikh Nimr al-Nimr in Saudi Arabia.
- Al Shabaab militants attacked an African Union base in southern Somalia on 15 January
- Gunmen attacked the Lido or beach area in Mogadishu on 21 January.

== See also ==
- Timeline of Somali history
- 2016 timeline of the War in Somalia
