= 2019 timeline of the Somali Civil War =

This is a 2019 timeline of events in the Somali Civil War (2009–present).

== January ==
- 15–16 January 2019 – A suicide bombing and mass shootings in the Westlands area of Nairobi, Kenya left 22 people and all five terrorists dead.
- 26 January 2019 – Luggage containing an improvised explosive device detonated in Nairobi's Central Business District while it was being carried on a mkokoteni cart, injuring two people.

== February ==
- 4 February 2019 – 11 people were killed and 10 others injured in a car bombing attack at a shopping mall in Mogadishu.
- 28 February 2019 – At least 30 people were killed and 60 others injured in three car bombing attacks followed by a siege in Mogadishu. The cars exploded near the Makka al-Mukarama hotel. The attack happened on Makka al-Mukarama road which was very busy at the time. Al-Shabaab has claimed responsibility for the attack.

== July ==
- 12 July 2019 – 26 were killed after four al-Shabaab gunmen attacked the Asasey Hotel in Kismayo, Jubaland, after the other attacker breached the gate with a car bomb.
- 22 July 2019 – At least 18 people were killed after a car bomb exploded on the road of Aden Adde International Airport and near the Afrin Hotel in Mogadishu, Somalia. Dozens others were injured, 17 critically. Al-Shabaab claimed responsibility for the attack.
- 24 July 2019 – A female suicide bomber entered and blew herself up inside Mogadishu Mayor Abdirahmean Omar Osman's office, during a security meeting, killing six government officials and injuring nine of Osman's staff. James Swan was the target of the attack, but Swan had met the mayor earlier, leaving before the blast occurred. Osman was critically wounded in the attack, and succumbed to his injuries a week later, on 1 August 2019, after having been transported to and hospitalised in Doha, Qatar. Responsibility was claimed by al-Shabaab. Seven people were killed, including Osman.

== September ==
- 30 September – C Troop, 1st Squadron, 102nd Cavalry Regiment, U.S. Army National Guard, deployed as security forces for Baledogle Airfield as part of Operation Spartan Shield, came under attack from al-Shabaab by VBIED and multiple dismounts, eventually repelling the attack.

== December ==
- 6 December 2019 – At least 11 people, including seven police officers, were shot dead on or outside a bus in Kenya by al-Shabaab militants.
- 28 December 2019 – A suicide truck bomber killed at least 85 people at the Ex-Control Afgoye police checkpoint in Mogadishu, Somalia. More than 140 others were wounded and, as of 31 December, 12 people remained missing. Al-Shabaab claimed responsibility for the attack on 30 December. The attack was the deadliest in Somalia since the 14 October 2017 Mogadishu bombings, which killed 587 people.

== See also ==
- Somali Civil War (2009–present)
