= 2017 in Somalia =

- Decades: 1990s; 2000s; 2010s; 2020s
- See also: History of Somalia; List of years in Somalia

Events from the year 2017 in Somalia

== Incumbents ==
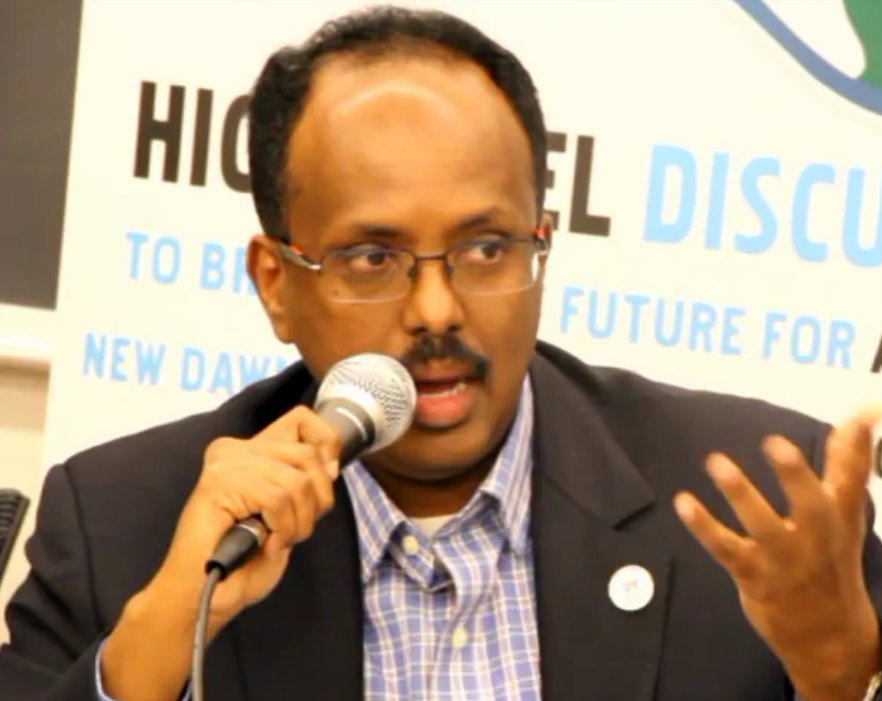
Mohamed Abdullahi Mohamed was elected new president of Somalia

- President – Hassan Sheikh Mohamud (until 8 February); Mohamed Abdullahi Mohamed
- Prime Minister – Omar Abdirashid Ali Sharmarke (until 1 March); Hassan Ali Khaire

== Events ==
- 2 January – 2 January 2017 Mogadishu bombings.
- 8 February – the Somali presidential election, 2017 concluded with Mohamed Abdullahi Mohamed elected as the new president
- 11 August – The Minister of Foreign Affairs Yusuf Garaad Omar wrote a letter to the US Ambassador alleging that al-Shabaab had gained control over uranium mining in the Galmudug region, and were shipping the material to Iran.

== Deaths ==
- 8 February – Mohamud Muse Hersi, politician.
- 3 May – Abbas Abdullahi Sheikh Siraji, politician (b. 1985)

== See also ==
- 2017 timeline of the War in Somalia
