= 2009 in Somalia =

- Decades: 1980s; 1990s; 2000s; 2010s; 2020s
- See also: History of Somalia; List of years in Somalia

The following lists events that happened in 2009 in Somalia.

== Incumbents ==
- President: Adan Mohamed Nuur Madobe (until January 31), Sharif Sheikh Ahmed (starting January 31)
- Prime Minister: Nur Hassan Hussein (until February 14), Omar Abdirashid Ali Sharmarke (starting February 14)

== Events ==
=== January ===
- January 1 - Somali pirates attack the MV S Venus.
- January 2 - Ethiopia withdraws its military forces from Somalia after two years of helping the Transitional Federal Government combat insurgents.
- January 2 - Somali pirates hijack the MV Kriti Episkopi.
- January 9 - The MV Sirius Star, a supertanker seized in the world's largest hijacking, is released with 2,000,000 barrels (320,000 m3) of oil and all 25 crew members unharmed after a US$3 million ransom is paid.
- January 9 - The Iranian-chartered wheat-carrying vessel MV Desire is released with 25 crew members unharmed.
- January 10 - A boat carrying eight Somali pirates from the freed supertanker MV Sirius Star capsizes in the Gulf of Aden, causing the deaths of five and the loss of their portion of US$3 million in ransom.
- January 14 - Somali pirates release two ships off the coast of East Africa.
- January 16 - Somali pirates release the Danish cargo ship CEC Future after receiving a ransom payment.
- January 23 - The 30-man crew of Chinese cargo ship Zhenhua 4 receives US$10,000 each after repelling Somali pirates in the Gulf of Aden.
- January 24 - A suicide car bomb targeting African Union peacekeepers kills 14 civilians in Mogadishu.
- January 29 - Somali pirates hijack the German oil tanker MV Longchamp in the Gulf of Aden.
- January 30 - Somalia's Transitional Federal Government collapses after Al-Shabaab captures Baidoa.
- January 31 - Sharif Ahmed is elected President of Somalia.

=== February ===
- February 4 - The director of Somalia's independent HornAfrik radio station, Said Tahlil Ahmed, is killed in Mogadishu.
- February 5 - Somali pirates release Ukraine's MV Faina following a US$3.2-million ransom payment.
- February 6 - Somali pirates will release the MV Blue Star and her crew of 28 Egyptians upon receiving a ransom.
- February 22 - An Al-Shabaab suicide attack kills at least 11 and injures 15 more Burundian peacekeepers on an African Union military base in Mogadishu.
- February 22 - Somali pirates hijack Greece's MV Saldanha in the Gulf of Aden.
- February 24 - At least 15 people are killed and 90 injured in heavy fighting in Mogadishu.
- February 26 - China's Navy and Denmark's Navy rescue Italian and Chinese merchant vessels from Somali pirates in the Gulf of Aden.
- February 27 - China's Navy and Denmark's Navy thwart Somali pirate attacks on Italian and Chinese merchant vessels in the Gulf of Aden.

=== March ===
- March 3 - German frigate Rheinland-Pfalz foils a Somali pirate attack on a German container ship in the Gulf of Aden.
- March 4 - British-Norwegian cruise line Fred Olsen's cruise ship Balmoral escapes a Somali pirate attack in the Gulf of Aden.
- March 5 - Somali pirates release Egypt's MV Blue Star.
- March 6 - The European Union will transfer to Kenya suspected Somali pirates captured during Operation Atalanta.
- March 18 - Somali pirates hijack an Iranian fishing vessel in the Gulf of Aden.
- March 21 - Somali pirates hijack the Indian cargo ship Al Rafiquei.
- March 22 - Somali pirates release the Indian cargo ship Al Rafiquei one day after hijacking it.
- March 23 - A Japanese cargo ship escapes Somali pirates in the Gulf of Aden.
- March 26 - Somali pirates hijack ships from the Isle of Man, Greece, and the Seychelles, while three other ships escape.
- March 31 - Seven Somali pirates are captured after mistakenly attacking the German Navy's FGS Spessart in the Gulf of Aden.

=== April ===
- April 4 - Somali pirates hijack the French yacht Tanit 32 km off Somalia.
- April 6 - Somali pirates hijack five ships from the United Kingdom, Taiwan, Germany, France, and Yemen.
- April 8 - Somali pirates hijack the Danish container ship MV Maersk Alabama in the Indian Ocean.
- April 9 - A military operation was conducted by France and Germany to retake the French yacht, Tanit.
- April 11 - The French Navy rescues four hostages and kills two Somali pirates on the hijacked yacht Tanit in the Gulf of Aden.
- April 12 - Captain Richard Phillips of the MV Maersk Alabama, who was abducted by Somali pirates, is rescued.
- April 13 - United States Representative Donald M. Payne comes under mortar fire at Aden Adde International Airport in Somalia.
- April 14 - Somali pirates hijack the MV Irene of Greece and MV Sea Horse of Lebanon. They also attempted to hijack the MV Safmarine Asia.
- April 15 - The French Navy captures 11 Somali pirates in the Gulf of Aden.
- April 18 - Canada's HMCS Winnipeg and the United States' USS Halyburton thwart Somali pirates' attack on a Norwegian oil tanker.
- April 18 - The Netherlands' Korps Commandotroepen rescue 20 Yemeni hostages from Somali pirates in the Gulf of Aden.
- April 20 - Somali pirates release the MV Sea Horse, reportedly for $100,000 or less in ransom.
- April 25 - Somali pirates hijack Germany's MV Patriot and release a Greek ship.
- April 26 - The cruise ship MSC Melody thwarts an attack by Somali pirates in the Gulf of Aden.
- April 26 - Somali pirates capture the MV Qana but Yemen recaptures it and arrests 11 pirates and kill 3. Three other oil tankers were saved by Yemen too.
- April 28 - The Russian destroyer Admiral Panteleyev detains 29 suspected Somali pirates in the Gulf of Aden.
- April 30 - The Italian cargo ship Jolley Smeraldo evades an attempted hijacking by Somali pirates.

=== May 1 ===
- May 1 - The Portuguese frigate Corte-Real confiscates explosives from Somali pirates during an attempted hijacking.
- May 2 - The bulk carrier MV Ariana is hijacked by Somali pirates in the Indian Ocean.
- May 3 - The French Navy frigate Nivôse captures 11 Somali pirates.
- May 4 - A South Korean Navy destroyer rescues a North Korean cargo ship from Somali pirates.
- May 6 - Somali pirates hijack Germany's MV Victoria and release the United Arab Emirates' MV Al Meezan.
- May 7 - Somali pirates hijack the Netherlands' MV Marathon and attack the U.S. Navy cargo ship Lewis and Clark.
- May 12 - Combat between the government and the Islamic Courts Union kills at least 123 people in Mogadishu.
- May 13 - The United Nations reports that Somalia is experiencing its worst drought since the 1990s.
- May 14 - The South Korean Navy destroyer Mummu the Great and the U.S. Navy cruiser Gettysburg capture 17 suspected Somali pirates in the Gulf of Aden.
- May 17 - Al-Shabaab captures Jowhar from the Transitional Federal Government.
- May 18 - Somalia requests international assistance to establish an anti-piracy coast guard.
- May 19 - Ethiopia's National Defense Force reenters Somalia.
- May 19 - Somali pirates release the German cargo ship MV Patriot.
- May 20 - Three civilians die during combat between Islamist insurgents and the African Union Mission in Mogadishu.
- May 22 - At least 36 people are killed as the Transitional Federal Government and Islamist militants battle in Mogadishu.
- May 25 - Somali President Sharif Ahmed requests international aid in combating Islamic militants.
- May 26 - The Swedish Navy arrests seven Somali pirates during the attempted hijacking of a Greek ship.
- May 27 - An anti-piracy warship destroys a Yemeni fishing vessel in the Red Sea, killing at least two people.

=== June ===
- June 2 - Oxfam International describes the humanitarian crisis in Somalia as "very dire".
- June 6 - At least 36 people die during combat between the Transitional Federal Government and Islamist militants in Webho.
- June 7 - Radio Shabelle director Moqtar Mohamed Hirabe is killed in Mogadishu.

== See also ==
- 2009 timeline of the War in Somalia
