= 2018 in Somalia =

- Decades: 1990s; 2000s; 2010s; 2020s
- See also: History of Somalia; List of years in Somalia

Events in the year 2018 in Somalia.

== Incumbents ==
- President – Mohamed Abdullahi Mohamed
- Prime Minister – Hassan Ali Khaire

== Events ==
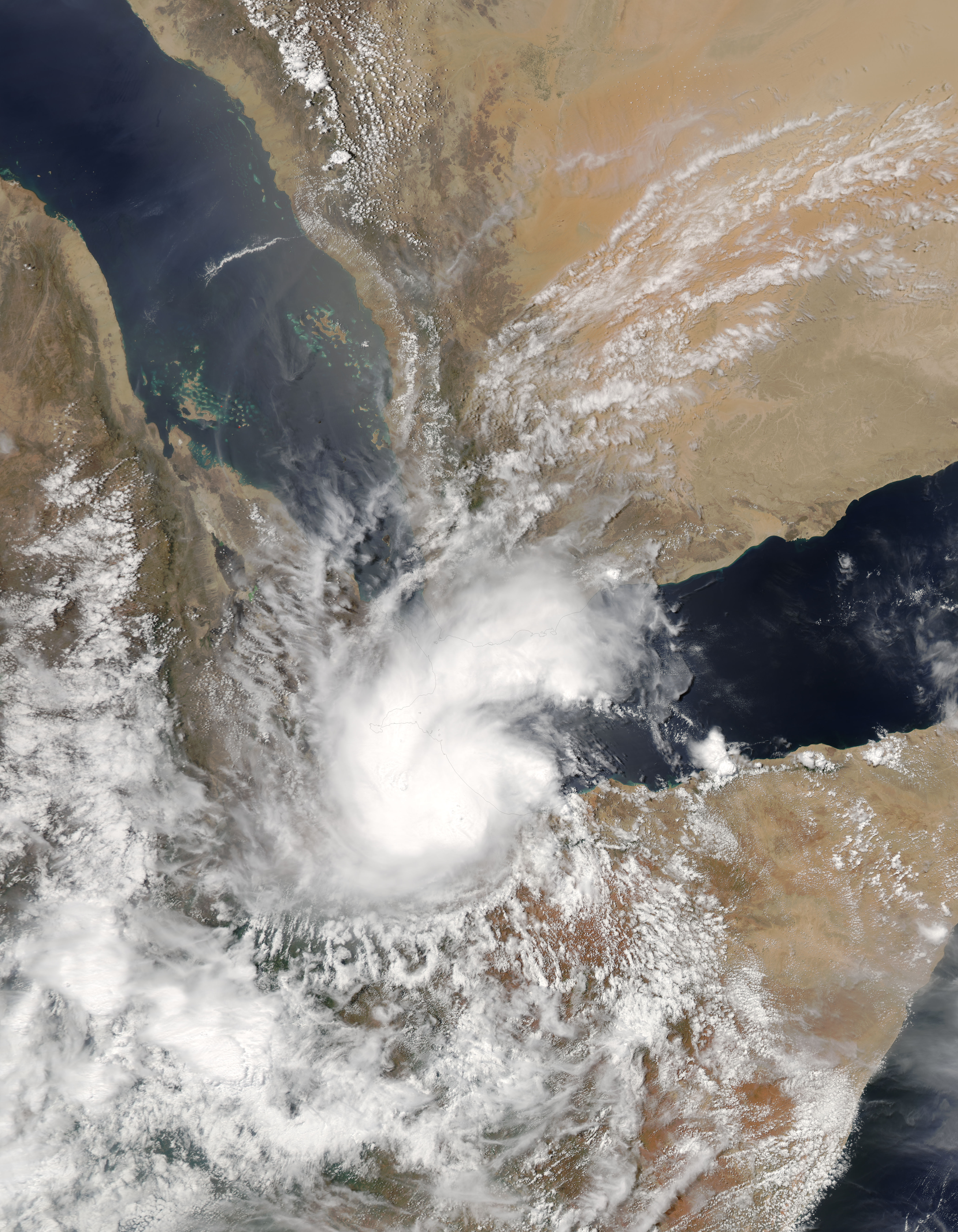
Cyclone Sagar after landfall on 19 May

- 23 February – February 2018 Mogadishu attack
- 16 March – Former Somali President Hassan Sheikh Mohamud was denied entry of U.S. visa under the Trump administration's travel ban.
- 1 April – 2018 African Union base attack in Bulo Marer
- 19 May – Cyclone Sagar makes landfall, killing 31 in Somalia

== Deaths ==
- 14 May – Abdulrahim Abby Farah, diplomat and politician (b. 1919).
