= August 2020 Mogadishu bombing =

August 2020 Mogadishu bombing may refer to:

- 2020 Mogadishu army base bombing
- 2020 Mogadishu hotel attack
