= Abdikani Mohamed Wa'ays =

Somali diplomat (died 2020)

Abdikani Mohamed Wa'ays (died May 10, 2020) was a veteran Somali diplomat. He was serving concurrently as Somalia's ambassador to Egypt and the Arab League at the time of his death in May 2020.

Wa'ays died from COVID-19 at a hospital in Kuwait on May 10, 2020. He had been hospitalized for a week prior to his death after testing positive for COVID-19 during the COVID-19 pandemic in Kuwait, though it was unknown why he originally traveled to Kuwait for treatment. He had had diabetes as well.

Wa'ays was the latest of a series of high-profile Somali deaths during the COVID-19 pandemic, including musician Hudeidi, former Prime Minister Nur Hassan Hussein and the Justice Minister of Hirshabelle State Khalif Mumin Tohow.
