= 2014 in Somalia =

- Decades: 1990s; 2000s; 2010s; 2020s
- See also: History of Somalia; List of years in Somalia

The following lists events that happened during 2014 in Somalia.

== Incumbents ==
- President: Hassan Sheikh Mohamud
- Prime Minister: Abdiweli Sheikh Ahmed (until 24 December), Omar Abdirashid Ali Sharmarke (starting 24 December)

== Events ==
=== January ===
- January 8 - A presidential election is held in Puntland.

=== December ===
- December 2 - Transparency International issues its 2014 Corruption Perceptions Index with Somalia tying with North Korea with the lowest ranking.

== See also ==
- 2014 timeline of the War in Somalia
