= 1960 in Somalia =

- Decades: 1940s; 1950s; 1960s; 1970s; 1980s
- See also: History of Somalia; List of years in Somalia

The following lists events that happened during 1960 in Somalia.

== Incumbents ==
- President: Aden Abdullah Osman Daar (starting 1 July)
- Prime Minister: Muhammad Haji Ibrahim Egal (1 July-12 July), Abdirashid Ali Shermarke (starting 12 July)

== Events ==
=== June ===
- June 26 - The State of Somaliland, led by Prime Minister Muhammad Haji Ibrahim Egal, attained independence from the United Kingdom.

=== July ===
- July 1 - Italian Somaliland gained its independence from Italy, five days after British Somaliland, and merged into the Somali Republic. Aden Abdullah Othman, leader of the Italian Somaliland legislature, was elected president, and Abdirashid Ali Shermake became prime minister.
