= 1970 in Somalia =

- Decades: 1950s; 1960s; 1970s; 1980s; 1990s
- See also: History of Somalia; List of years in Somalia

The following lists events that happened during 1970 in Somalia.

== Incumbents ==
- President: Siad Barre

== Events ==
- In April, Barre created the National Security Courts, judicial bodies which tried his political opponents and public critics
- On 10 September, the government enacted National Security Law No. 54, allowing the NSS to punish critics of the regime with indefinite detention without trial
- On 21 October, Barre declared Somalia a Socialist state run according to the principles of Scientific socialism, and banned diyya blood money
- Nuruddin Farah published From a Crooked Rib

== See also ==
- Timeline of Somali history
