= 2013 in Somalia =

- Decades: 1990s; 2000s; 2010s; 2020s
- See also: History of Somalia; List of years in Somalia

This is a timeline of events in the War in Somalia (2009–present).

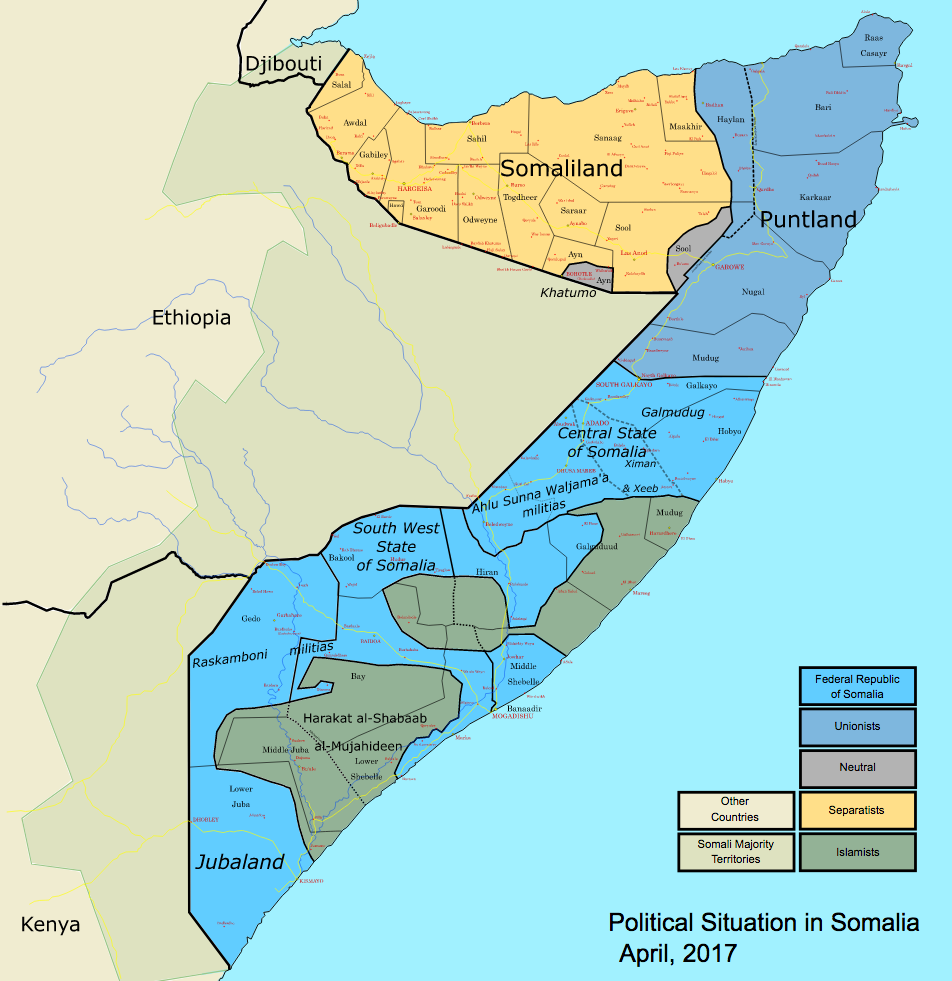
Situation in Somalia (as of 25 March 2013)

== Incumbents ==
- President: Farmajo
- Prime Minister: Abdi Farah Shirdon (until 21 December), Abdiweli Sheikh Ahmed (starting 21 December)

== Deaths ==
- 21 January — The former Vice President of Puntland, Hassan Dahir Mohamud 'AfQurac', died in a hospital in Nairobi, the capital of Kenya.
- 15 February — Sheikh Abdulkadir Nur Farah, 73, Somali cleric, preacher, and Islamic scholar known for his contributions to Dawah, Assassinated by Al-Shabab.

== See also ==
- Somali Civil War (2009–present)
- 2013 timeline of the War in Somalia
