= 2012 in Somalia =

- Decades: 1990s; 2000s; 2010s; 2020s
- See also: History of Somalia; List of years in Somalia

The following lists events that happened during 2012 in Somalia.

== Incumbents ==
- President:
  - until 20 August: Sharif Sheikh Ahmed
  - 20 August-28 August: Muse Hassan Sheikh Sayid Abdulle (acting)
  - 28 August-16 September: Mohamed Osman Jawari (acting)
  - starting 16 September: Hassan Sheikh Mohamud
- Prime Minister: Abdiweli Mohamed Ali (until 17 October), Abdi Farah Shirdon (starting 17 October)

== Events ==
=== September ===
- September 10 - Members of the new Somali Parliament elect Hassan Sheikh Mohamoud President.

== Deaths ==
=== March ===
- March 23 – Abdullahi Yusuf Ahmed (born 1934), former Somali president.

=== April ===
- April 2 – Samia Yusuf Omar (born 1991), Somali athlete.

=== June ===
- June 12 – Mukhtar Mohamed Hussein (born 1912), Somali politician.

== See also ==
- 2012 timeline of the War in Somalia
