= 1969 in Somalia =

- Decades: 1940s; 1950s; 1960s; 1970s; 1980s
- See also: History of Somalia; List of years in Somalia

The following lists events that happened during 1969 in Somalia.

== Incumbents ==
- President:
  - until 15 October: Abdirashid Ali Shermarke
  - 15 October-21 October: Sheikh Mukhtar Mohamed Hussein
  - starting 21 October: Siad Barre
- Prime Minister: Muhammad Haji Ibrahim Egal (until 1 November)

== Events ==
- October 15 – President Abdirashid Ali Shermarke is assassinated by one of his own bodyguards in the town of Las Anod.
- October 21 – General Siad Barre comes to power in Somalia in a coup d'état, 6 days after the assassination of President Abdirashid Ali Shermarke.

== Births ==
- November 13 – Ayaan Hirsi Ali, Somali-born Dutch American activist
