= 1997 in Somalia =

- Decades: 1970s; 1980s; 1990s; 2000s; 2010s
- See also: History of Somalia; List of years in Somalia

The following lists events that happened during 1997 in Somalia.

== Incumbents ==
- President: Ali Mahdi Muhammad

== Events ==
=== November ===
- November 5 - The Red Cross aids the victims of the Somali flood.
- November 13 - The death toll of the Somali flood increases to 500.
- November 14 - Another 125 people are reported to have died during the Somali flood.
- November 17 - The death toll of the Somali flood reaches 2,000.
- November 23 - Food packets are dropped in southern Somalia for the flood victims.

=== December ===
- December 2 - The Somali flood report says that tens of thousands struggle to survive and people are hardly getting any help.
- December 3 - 1997 Somalia flood
  - The floodwaters increase panic in Somalia as it threatens thousands of lives.
  - The flood has been reported to have now affected over a million people.
- December 5 - United Nations helicopters arrive to aid Somalia during the flood.
- December 15 - The flood of Somalia eases as more people get emergency help.
- December 22 - After the floods, aid agencies in Somalia get concerned over the risk of cholera.
- December 25 - Hussein Mohamed Aidid and Former President Ali Mahdi Mohamed sign a power sharing pact to discuss forming Somalia's first central government for six years in the next two months.
- December 26 - Egyptian President Husni Mubarak told visiting Somali faction leaders that he will help rebuild Somalia.
