= 1990 in Somalia =

- Decades: 1970s; 1980s; 1990s; 2000s; 2010s
- See also: History of Somalia; List of years in Somalia

The following lists events that happened during 1990 in Somalia.

== Incumbents ==
- President: Siad Barre
- Prime Minister: Mohammad Ali Samatar (until 3 September), Muhammad Hawadle Madar (starting 3 September)

== Events ==
=== July ===
- July 6 - President Siad Barre's bodyguards massacre anti-government demonstrators during a soccer match; 65 people are killed, more than 300 seriously injured.
