= 2015 in Somalia =

- Decades: 1990s; 2000s; 2010s; 2020s
- See also: History of Somalia; List of years in Somalia

The following lists events that happened during 2015 in Somalia.

== Incumbents ==
- President: Hassan Sheikh Mohamud
- Prime Minister: Omar Abdirashid Ali Sharmarke

== Events ==
=== January ===
- January 27 - Prime Minister Omar Abdirashid Ali Sharmarke appoints a new, smaller 20 minister Cabinet.

== See also ==
- 2015 timeline of the War in Somalia
