= 1986 in Somalia =

- Decades: 1960s; 1970s; 1980s; 1990s; 2000s
- See also: History of Somalia; List of years in Somalia

The following lists events that happened during 1986 in the Somali Democratic Republic.

== Incumbents ==
- President: Siad Barre

== Events ==
Ongoing – Somali Rebellion

=== January ===
- January – President Barre and the Ethiopian president Mengistu Haile Mariam meet in Djibouti to normalise relations between the two countries.

=== May ===
- May 23 – President Barre suffers life-threatening injuries in an automobile collision near Mogadishu, when the car that was transporting him smashed into the back of a bus during a heavy rainstorm. He was treated in a hospital in Saudi Arabia for head injuries, broken ribs and shock over a period of a month.

=== December ===
- December 23 – The Somali Presidential Elections take place, reelecting Siad Barre for another term.

== See also ==
- Somali Rebellion
