= 1991 in Somalia =

- Decades: 1970s; 1980s; 1990s; 2000s; 2010s
- See also: History of Somalia; List of years in Somalia

The following lists events that happened during 1991 in Somalia.

== Incumbents ==
- President: Siad Barre (until 26 January), Ali Mahdi Muhammad (starting 26 January)
- Prime Minister: Muhammad Hawadle Madar (until 24 January), Umar Arteh Ghalib (starting 24 January)

== Events ==
=== January ===
- January 5 – Several officials were killed in a mortar shelling in Kaaraan neighborhood of Mogadishu, including former minister Haji Muse Boqor, Sheikh Mohamed Faruur, Hashi Weheliye Moalim and Mohamed Said Gentleman.
- January 26 – Somali Civil War started which would later turn into a war against Islamists.
- January 29 - Siad Barre is succeeded by Ali Mahdi Muhammad as President of Somalia.

=== May ===
- May 18 - Somaliland withdraws from Somalia.

== Deaths ==
- Haji Muse Boqor first minister of Interior affairs (1956-1959).
