= Khalif Mumin Tohow =

Somali politician (died 2020)

Khalif Mumin Tohow (died 12 April 2020) was a Somali politician. Tohow served as the state Justice Minister for Hirshabelle State, an autonomous region within Somalia, until his death in April 2020. He was also a member of the Legislative Assembly of Hirshabelle State.

In November 2019, Tohow, a Somali who also held a British passport, traveled to the United Kingdom before returning to Somalia. In March 2020, he was feeling sick in Jowhar, the capital of Hirshabelle State, he was sent to Mogadishu for treatment on 7 April; he later tested positive for novel COVID-19, in Mogadishu, the capital of Somalia, on 9 April 2020. Khalif Mumin Tohow died from COVID-19 at Martini Hospital in Mogadishu on 12 April 2020 during the COVID-19 pandemic in Somalia, just 3 days after testing positive for the virus due to lack of care at Martini Hospital. Tohow was Somalia's second recorded fatality from COVID-19. His condition was announced in a tweet by the Somali Federal Minister for Health and Social Care, Fawziya Abikar Nur, though she gave no specifics at the tome of his death.

Following Tohow's death, Somali authorities quarantined and self-isolated Hirshabelle State President Mohammed Abdi Waare and Southwest State President Abdiaziz Hassan Mohamed Laftagareen at their homes since they had recently been in close contact with Tohow.
