= 2011 in Somalia =

- Decades: 1990s; 2000s; 2010s; 2020s
- See also: History of Somalia; List of years in Somalia

The following lists events that happened during 2011 in Somalia.

== Incumbents ==
- In 2011, the political situation in Somalia was complex and fluid. The country had been without a functioning central government since the collapse of the Siad Barre regime in 1991, and various factions and warlords had been vying for control of the country. At that time the Transitional Federal Government (TFG) was the internationally recognized government of Somalia, but it had limited control over the country and was largely confined to the capital city of Mogadishu. The TFG was established in 2004 as part of a peace process and was supposed to be a temporary government until new elections could be held. However, it had been plagued by infighting and was considered ineffective in providing security and services to the population. The President of the TFG in 2011 was Sharif Sheikh Ahmed, who had taken office in 2009. The Prime Minister was Abdiweli Mohamed Ali. In addition to the TFG, there were several other key players in Somalia at the time. One of the most powerful was the Islamist group al-Shabaab, which controlled large parts of southern and central Somalia and had declared itself the country's true government. Another important group was the semi-autonomous region of Puntland in northeastern Somalia, which had its own government and military. It was a challenging period in the history of Somalia, and the security and political situation in the country remained unstable. The TFG's mandate ended in August 2012 and was replaced by Federal Government of Somalia.
- President: Sharif Sheikh Ahmed
- Prime Minister: Mohamed Abdullahi Mohamed (until 19 June 2011), Abdiweli Mohamed Ali (after 19 June 2011)

== Events ==
February 18, Puntland region has suspended its antipiracy training deal with Saracen International, a South African mercenary firm linked to Erik Prince of Blackwater, citing consultation with the U.N. The program had been halted since Feb. 12, following a similar cancellation by the Somali government in January. On 20 July, the United Nations officially declared famine in two regions in the southern part of the country (IPC Phase 5), the first time a famine had been declared in the region by the UN in nearly thirty years.

== Deaths ==
- 4 December — An armed gunmen killed Ahmed Haji Abdirahman in Bosaso, Al-Shabab was claimed the assissaination of Dr. Abdirahman.
- Tens of thousands of people are believed to have died in southern Somalia before famine was declared.

== See also ==
- 2011 timeline of the War in Somalia
