= 2023 timeline of the Somali Civil War =

This is a 2023 timeline of events in the Somali Civil War (2009–present).

== January ==
- 4 January: Mahas bombings.
- 22 January: six members of the al-Shabaab terrorist group carried out a coordinated assault on the Mogadishu Mayor's Office, involving both a suicide bombing and armed gunmen. The attack resulted in the deaths of four and left 29 civilians injured.

== April ==
- 11 April: Secretary-General of the United Nations António Guterres arrives in Mogadishu for talks on war aid.
- 22 April: 21 are killed in Masagaway District.

== May ==
- 4 May: Somali government reports a 70% decrease in al-Shabab attacks.
- 26 May: Battle of Buulo Mareer, al-Shabaab attack on Ugandan forces.

== June ==
- 10 June: 2023 Mogadishu hotel attack.

== July ==
- 24 July: At least 30 Somali Army soldiers were killed and many others were wounded after an al-Shabaab militant suicide bombed an army training camp in Mogadishu.

== August ==
- 26 August: At least 13 al-Shabaab militants were killed in an American airstrike in the vicinity of Seiera, approximately 45 kilometers northwest of Kismayo.

== September ==
- 29 September: An al-Shabaab suicide bomber blew himself up in a tea shop in Mogadishu; at least seven people died.

== October ==
- 4 October: At least 20 Somali Army soldiers were killed in fighting with al-Shabaab militants in an area of Galmudug state known as Shabelow forest.
