= 2010 in Somalia =

- Decades: 1990s; 2000s; 2010s; 2020s
- See also: History of Somalia; List of years in Somalia

The timeline of events in Somalia in 2010.

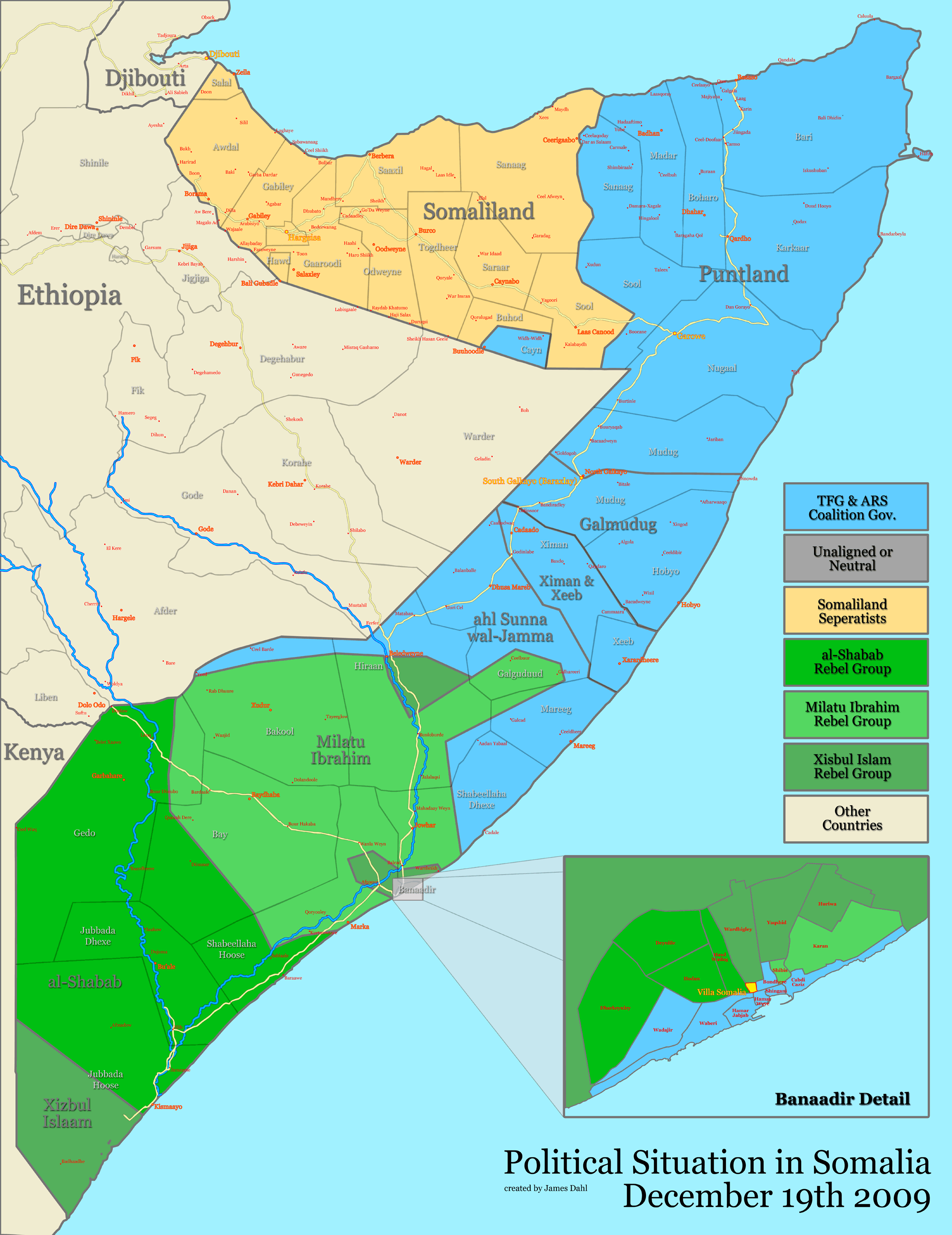
Situation in Somalia as of 1 January 2010

== Incumbents ==
- President: Sharif Sheikh Ahmed
- Prime Minister:
  - until 24 September: Omar Abdirashid Ali Sharmarke
  - 24 September-1 November: Abdiwahid Elmi Gonjeh
  - starting 1 November: Mohamed Abdullahi Mohamed

== Events ==
=== January ===
- January 2 - Pirates seize the oil tanker Pramoni.

=== August ===
- August 23 - Battle of Mogadishu (2010–2011) begins. Al-Shabaab gunman kill 40 people in Mogadishu.
- August 24 - Al-Shabaab gunmen and a suicide bomber attack a hotel, killing dozens, including six politicians.

== See also ==
- 2010 timeline of the War in Somalia
