= MV Qana =

Yemeni tanker (1978–2021)

History
- Name: Qana (Gna)
- Owner: Government of South Yemen (1978–1983); Aden Refinery Company (1983–2009)
- Port of registry: Aden (Yemen)
- Builder: Tokushima Sangyo, Komatsushima, Japan
- Yard number: 531
- Launched: 8 February 1978
- Completed: 25 April 1978
- In service: 1978
- Out of service: 2009
- Identification: IMO number: 7722994
- Captured: Captured 26 April 2009, recaptured by Yemen
- Fate: Scrapped 2021

General characteristics
- Tonnage: 1,886 GT; 3,185 DWT
- Length: 89.2 m (292 ft 8 in) oa
- Beam: 13.0 m (42 ft 8 in)
- Installed power: Diesel engine
- Propulsion: 1 × propeller
- Speed: 13.5 knots (25.0 km/h; 15.5 mph)
- Crew: 23

MV Qana or Gna (Note: The ship's registered name was Gna, but at the time of the hijacking was widely spelled Qana, which is a transliteration of the ship's Arabic name قنا (Q'na)) was a Yemeni tanker, built in Japan in 1978. On 26 April 2009 it was hijacked of the coast of Yemen by Somali pirates but recovered by the Yemeni coastguard the following day. The captured Somalis were later found guilty of piracy. The ship was broken up in 2021.

== Description and construction ==
The oil products tanker was built in 1978 as Yard 531 by the Japanese shipyard Tokushima Sangyo, at Komatsushima and launched for the government of South Yemen as Gna on 8 February 1978. It was measured as 1,886 GT, with a length overall of 89.2 m (292 ft 8 in) and breadth of 13.0 m (42 ft 8 in), and a deadweight capacity of 3,185 tonnes. The tanker was powered by a single diesel engine driving one propeller, which gave a service speed of 13.5 knots (25.0 km/h; 15.5 mph).

Gna was completed on 25 April 1978 and was registered at the port of Aden. In 1983 the government transferred ownership to the Aden Refinery Company, and the tanker was used for distributing oil products to other Yemeni ports.

== Hijacking ==
The tanker, without cargo and with a crew of 23, was captured by Somali pirates on 26 April 2009, 10 miles (16 km) off the coast of Yemen, after it left Nishtun, Al Mahrah Governorate for Aden, escorted by Yemen Coast Guard vessels. In initial unsuccessful attempts to regain control by the coast guard and the Yemeni Navy, two pirates were killed and seven captured.

The following day, Yemeni special forces stormed the ship using helicopters and recaptured it. Three further pirates were killed and four were captured. During the firefight five crew members, including one Indian, were injured. After the recapture, it was taken to Mukalla. The Yemeni forces also recaptured three smaller vessels which had been seized on the same day in a separate incident, killing two pirates and capturing at least four.

It was later stated that, during the incident on Qana, one Yemeni crew-member was killed, another was missing, and four others were wounded.

=== Trial ===
On 18 May 2010, six of the pirates were sentenced to death by a court in Sana'a, and six others sentenced to prison terms of 10 years each. In addition the pirates were ordered to pay 2 million Yemeni rials (about US$ 9200 in 2010) restitution to the ship's owner, some of which would be paid to the victims' families.

== Aftermath ==
Following restoration of the tanker to the Aden Refinery Company, it was laid up in November 2009. In 2014, Gna was towed from the refinery to an anchorage off the port of Aden where, by October 2019, it had partially sunk. In April 2021 the tanker's status was reported as broken up.
