= 2021 Golweyn ambush =

- Part of the War in Somalia
- Map of Somalia, showing Golweyn and the capital Mogadishu (clickable map)
Date	10 August 2021
Location	Golweyn, Lower Shebelle, Somalia
Result	AMISOM victory
Territorial changes	no known territorial consequences

Belligerents
Al-Shabaab	AMISOM: Uganda

Commanders and leaders
Unknown	(Uganda) Unidentified commander

Units involved
Unknown	Uganda People's Defence Force (UPDF)

Casualties and losses
Unknown	Ugandan: 1 killed, 2 wounded

On August 10, 2021, a patrol of Ugandan soldiers that formed part of the African Union Mission to Somalia (AMISOM) were ambushed and attacked in a farmland about 2½ kilometers from Golweyn (some 100 km south of Somalia's capital Mogadishu) by Al-Shabaab Islamic militants while on a routine patrol to secure the main supply route along the Beldamin-Golweyn Forward Operating Base in the Lower Shabelle.
This attack was followed by an exchange of gunfire between AMISOM forces and Al-Shabaab militants, that lasted several hours. "During the counterattack, 7 terrorists were killed while others sustained injuries and an assortment of weapons was recovered," AMISOM said in a tweet. Also one Ugandan soldier died. But afterwards, reports were received that the 7 deceased were not members of Al-Shabaab but civilians and that they had been killed by AMISOM forces, upon which the tweet was deleted. Abdulkadir Mohamed Nur, the Governor of Lower Shabelle confirmed after talking to local residents, that five farmers and two others whose vehicle broke down on the side of the road, were killed by the AMISOM soldiers after the ambush by al-Shabaab. District Commissioner Nur Osman Rage, detailed that after their encounter with Al-Shabaab, AMISOM forces "diverted to a nearby farm, picked an elderly farmer and four of his workers, blindfolded them and paraded them on the tarmac road. They then stopped two trucks on transit in the area, picked the two drivers, blindfolded them and together with the other five, took them to a point where an IED was planted, forced the civilians to sit on the device and detonated it on the seven victims who were blindfolded, instantly killing them.” The incident was allegedly witnessed firsthand by Somali security officers, local elders and many others in the area.

== Investigation ==
AMISOM launched an investigation into the incident. A seven-member Board of Inquiry (BOI) was established led by a senior officer and two members from the African Union Commission in Addis Ababa. Others include a senior official from the Federal Government of Somalia, and a senior officer each from AMISOM Military, Police and Mission Headquarters. The investigation should be concluded by September 6, 2021. The Board will recommend payment of amends to the affected families in the event AMISOM soldiers are found culpable. In addition, the Government of Uganda assured that in the spirit of transparency, if the BOI establishes that its officers have a case to answer, a court-martial would be constituted and held in Somalia to try those implicated. In the meantime, relatives of the deceased have refused to bury their bodies until AMISOM admits to killing their relatives.
As of mid September 2021, no media reports on the progress or results of the investigation by the Board of Inquiry could be found.

== See also ==
- 2017 Golweyn ambush
- Somali Civil War (2009–present)
- African Union Mission to Somalia
