= Baidoa Eid bombing =

- Part of Somali Civil War (2009-present)
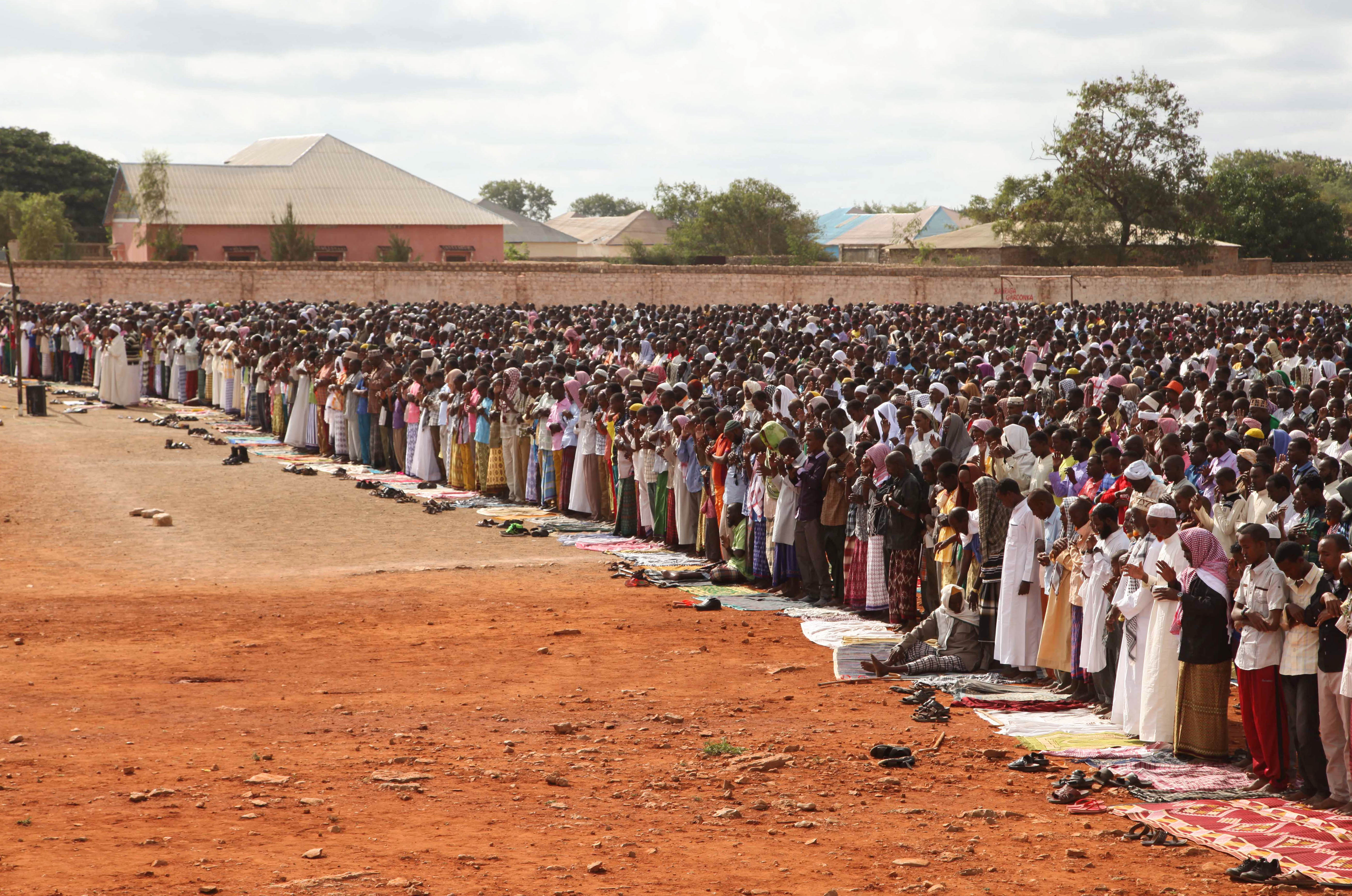
- Eid al-Fitr celebrations in Baidoa circa 2014
- Location: Southwest of Baidoa, Somalia
- Date: May 24, 2020
- Target: Eid al-Fitr festival
- Attack type: Bombing
- Deaths: 5-7
- Injuries: 20+
- Perpetrator: al-Shabaab (suspected)

On May 24, 2020, at least five people were killed and twenty were injured during a bombing in Baidoa, Somalia, while civilians were celebrating Eid al-Fitr.

== Background ==
al-Shabaab, a jihadist militant group, has been waging an insurgency against the Somali government since 2009. They have attacked the government-controlled city of Baidoa multiple times throughout the Somali civil war, and control large swathes of the countryside around Bay region. In 2016, an attack by al-Shabaab on Baidoa killed over thirty people.

An attack in Dinsoor, also in Bay region, during Eid festivals on May 23 killed an unknown number of people.

== Bombing ==
The bombing occurred at an IDP camp on the southwestern outskirts of Baidoa on the afternoon of May 24. At the time of the attack, residents were dancing and celebrating Eid al-Fitr at a festival. Somali officials stated that the bomb was placed at the site of the festival before the attack, and that it was not known whether al-Shabaab militants were present at the site. al-Shabaab did not claim responsibility for the attack unlike previous attacks that week, and instead posted photos of Eid celebrations in the al-Shabaab-controlled cities of Jilib and Bu'ale. Initial tolls stated four people, including two children, were killed, and fifteen were injured. This number increased to five killed and twenty injured, with numbers expected to rise.

The attacks in Baidoa and Dinsoor killed a total of seven people and injured forty others, although it is not known how many people were killed in Dinsoor.
