= 2 January 2017 Mogadishu bombings =

Terrorist incident in Somalia

- Part of the Somali Civil War (2009–present)
- Mogadishu (Somalia)
- Location: Mogadishu, Somalia
- Date: 2 January 2017
- Target: Civilians, security forces
- Attack type: Suicide car bombing
- Weapon: Car bombs
- Deaths: At least 7 (+2 attackers)
- Injuries: 17
- Perpetrator: Al-Shabaab

The 2 January 2017 Mogadishu bombings took place on 2 January 2017, when a pair of suicide car bombings targeted civilians and security forces in Somalia's capital. The first targeted a checkpoint, while a second car drove at high speed through it and detonated outside the Peace Hotel, opposite Aden Adde International Airport. The attack killed at least seven people and injured 17 others. The al-Shabaab militant group claimed responsibility for the attack.
