= 2016 timeline of the Somali Civil War =

This is a 2016 timeline of events in the Somali Civil War (2009–present).

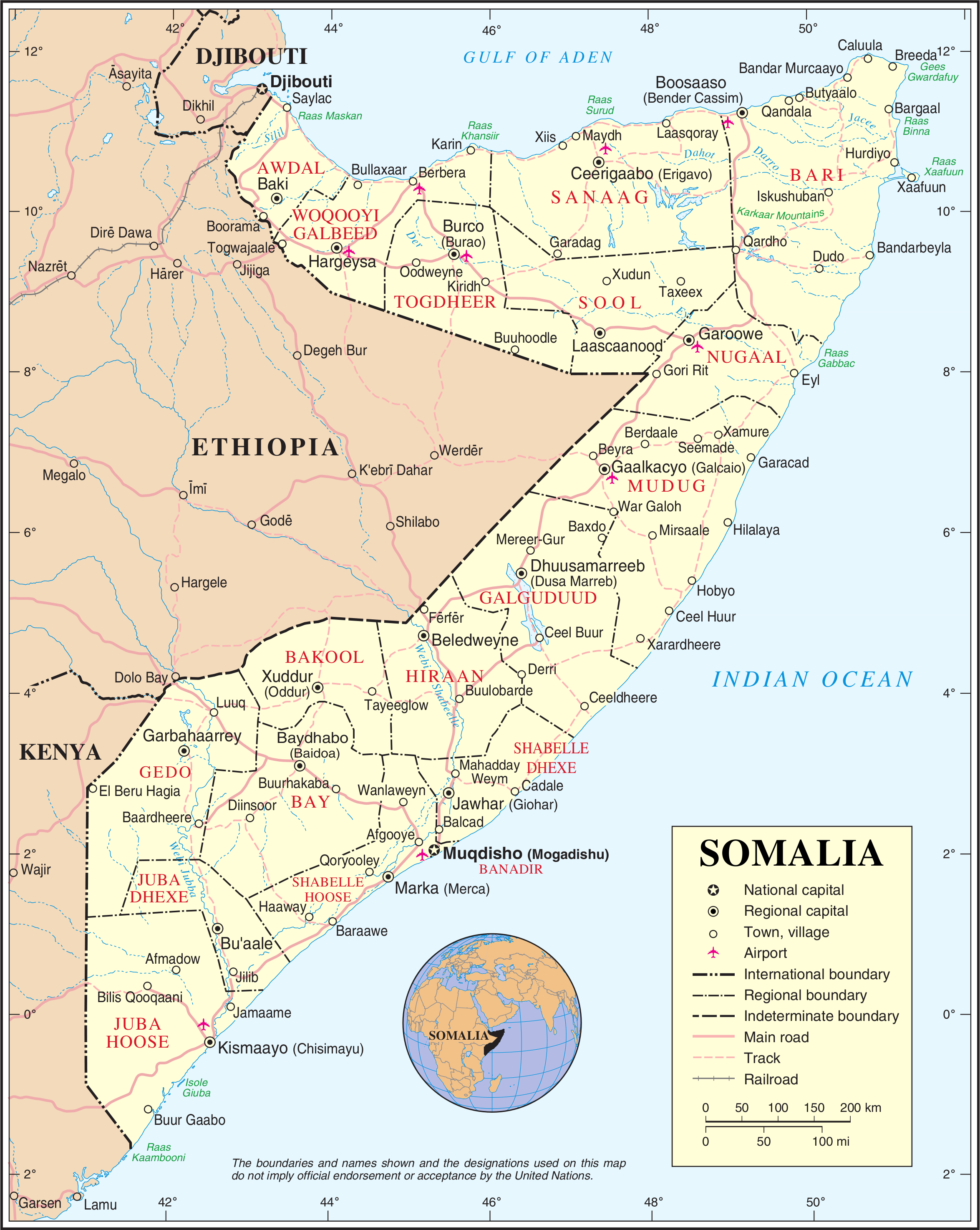
General map of Somalia

== January ==
- January 1 – Gunmen open fire at a mosque near Mogadishu, killing 1 person and injuring 4 others including a Turkish aid worker. No one has claimed responsibility for the attacks but al-Shabaab are suspected to have orchestrated the attack.
- January 2 – A popular restaurant in Mogadishu is attacked by a suicide bomber, killing 4 people including himself.
- January 15 – Al-Shabaab militants had raided an African Union base in southern Somalia with unconfirmed reports of dozens of soldiers being killed in the process.
- January 21 – Al-Shabaab militants attack the lido or beach area in Mogadishu, killing at least 20 people.

== February ==
- February 2 – Daallo Airlines Flight 159 explodes in mid-air with only the suicide bomber dying but 2 remain injured.
- February 5 – Al-Shabaab has claimed to have seized control over the southern port town of Marka after Somali forces and AU forces leave.
- February 15 – A car bomb in Mogadishu kills the defence minister and injures another.
- February 26 – Al-Shabaab militants raid the Somali Youth League hotel in Mogadishu, killing 14 people.
- February 28 – At least 30 people are killed by al-Shabaab militants who bombed a restaurant near the town of Baidoa.

== March ==
- March 7 – According to the Pentagon, US air strikes kill at least 150 al-Shabaab militants near the city of Buloburde. The Australian Navy also seizes an arms cache off Oman's coast heading towards Somalia.
- March 9 – US troops stage an overnight raid on the al-Shabaab controlled city of Awdhegele in the Lower Shebelle region.
- March 28 – At least 115 al-Shabaab militants are killed by Somali forces in the Galmudug region with an extra 110 captured.
- March 31 – A suicide bomber in Puntland kills the treasurer of Galkayo, Saeed Ali, by hugging him, along with several officers guarding him.

== April ==
- April 1 – A US drone strike reportedly kills a key al-Shabaab leader, Hassan Ali Dhoore, in Jilib and two other militants.
- April 11 – At least five people are killed and seven others injured by a car bomb claimed by al-Shabaab against a government building in Mogadishu.
- April 12 – For the past two days, US officials claim air strikes in southern Somalia killed a dozen suspected al-Shabaab militants.
- April 16 – African Union troops kill 4 Somali civilians in the town of Bulla Marer in the south of Mogadishu. The AU mission claimed that soldiers had opened fire on a car in fear as the civilians failed to stop at a roadblock.

== May ==
- May 2 – The first British troops are deployed in Somalia to help combat al-Shabaab as part of a UN mission.
- May 9 – A suicide car bomb claimed by al-Shabaab blows up at Mogadishu's traffic police headquarters killing 4, including at least 2 Somali police officers.

== June ==
- June 1 – Al-Shabaab militants claim responsibility for a car bomb on a hotel in Mogadishu killing 16 and injuring a further 55. At the same time, the US declares an air strike killed a top al-Shabaab commander, Abdullahi Da'ud.
- June 2 – At least 16 al-Shabaab militants are killed in a raid by Somali forces near Kismayo, including the mastermind behind the Garissa University College attack.
- June 9 – Al-Shabaab claims to have killed 60 Ethiopian troops at an AU base.
- June 21 – Five police officers in Kenya are killed in an ambush by al-Shabaab near their convoy in El Wak, Kenya.
- June 25 – An attack by gunmen on a hotel in Mogadishu sees at least 15 deaths, 25 injuries and an unknown number of hostages taken by al-Shabaab.
- June 29 – Five suspected militants are killed by Kenyan forces in Lamu County after a clash and Malindi.

== July ==
- July 1 – At least six are shot dead and several wounded by al-Shabaab militants in two ambushed buses in Mandera, Kenya near the border with Somalia.
- July 11 – A clash between Somali forces and al-Shabaab sees 10 Somali troops killed and 12 al-Shabaab militants killed in Afgooye, Lower Shabelle.
- July 14 – An alleged al-Shabaab militant shoots and kills four police officers in Kapenguria, Kenya. However, it is later revealed that it was a rogue officer instead.
- July 26 – Al-Shabaab claims responsibility for a double suicide car bombing near an AU base in Mogadishu at the airport, killing at least 13 including seven UN guards.

== August ==
- August 21 – At least 20 people are killed in a twin suicide bombing by al-Shabaab against a Puntland local government office in Galkayo.
- August 30 – At least 10 people are killed by a car bomb detonated by al-Shabaab outside the President of Somalia's office.

== October ==
- October 1 – Four people are killed with five injured by an al-Shabaab attack on a prison near Mogadishu. The Somali government also demands an explanation from the US after 22 civilians and other soldiers were killed in airstrikes in Galmudug as opposed to al-Shabaab militants.
- October 4 – Somali forces kill 14 al-Shabaab militants in a raid in the Lower Shabelle region.
- October 6 – At least 6 people are killed in an al-Shabaab attack in neighboring Kenya's Mandera.
- October 25 – An intelligence officer is shot dead by an al-Shabaab militant in Mogadishu.
- October 26 – A militant group aligned with the Islamic State of Iraq and the Levant seizes Qandala in Puntland.

== November ==
- November 7 – A fight between militias in Galkayo kills 29 people and wounds 50 more.
- November 26 – At least 20 people are killed in another car bomb attack in Mogadishu at a market. Somali forces arrest a suspect.
- November 28 – At least 28 people are killed in a clash between militia and al-Shabaab in the southern Mudug region.
- November 29 – A roadside bomb kills at least 4 Somali soldiers and leaves 11 others injured while forces have mulled an attack on ISIL.

== December ==
- December 3 – Somali forces kill seven insurgents loyal to ISIL in a clash in the north of the country.

== See also ==
- Operation Indian Ocean
- Somali Civil War (2009–present)
