= February 2018 Mogadishu attacks =

Terrorist incident in Somalia

- Part of Somali Civil War (2009–present)
- Mogadishu (Somalia)
- Location: Mogadishu, Somalia
- Date: 23 February 2018
- Attack type: Suicide car bombings, shooting
- Deaths: 45 (+7 attackers)
- Injuries: 36
- Perpetrator: Al-Shabaab

On 23 February 2018, at least 45 people were killed and 36 others injured in two car bombings and a shooting in Mogadishu. Al-Shabaab later claimed responsibility.

== Attack ==
On 23 February 2018, two suicide car bombs exploded in the Somali capital of Mogadishu. The first car bomb went off after militants breached a checkpoint near the president's residence by shooting at security personnel. The other detonated in front of a hotel away from the palace. 45 bystanders were killed and 36 others injured. Five attackers were also reported dead.

== Responsibility ==
The Somalia-based Islamist group Al-Shabaab claimed responsibility for the attack via its Andalus radio arm, stating that both its drivers were suicide bombers.
