= Mahas bombings =

Mass murder in Somalia by al-Shabaab on 4 January 2023

- Part of the Somali Civil War
- Location: Mahas District, Hiran, Somalia
- Date: 4 January 2023
- Target: Politicians, marketplace
- Attack type: Double car bombing
- Weapon: Car bombs
- Deaths: 35+
- Injuries: 40+
- Perpetrator: al-Shabaab
- Defenders: Somali Army and government-backed clan militias

On 4 January 2023, an al-Shabaab double car bombing killed at least 35 people and injured at least 40 others in Mahas District, Hiran, Somalia.

== Background ==
The Somali Civil War began in the early 1990s. Al-Shabaab are a Somali jihadist group who began an insurgency in 2006.

== Bombings ==
On 4 January 2023, a double car bombing occurred in Mahas District in Hiran, in central Somalia. The first targeted politicians' houses, and the second a market. Later the same day, al-Shabaab claimed responsibility for the attacks.

== See also ==
- 2023 in Somalia
- List of terrorist incidents in 2023
