= Fawziya Abikar Nur =

Somali health minister

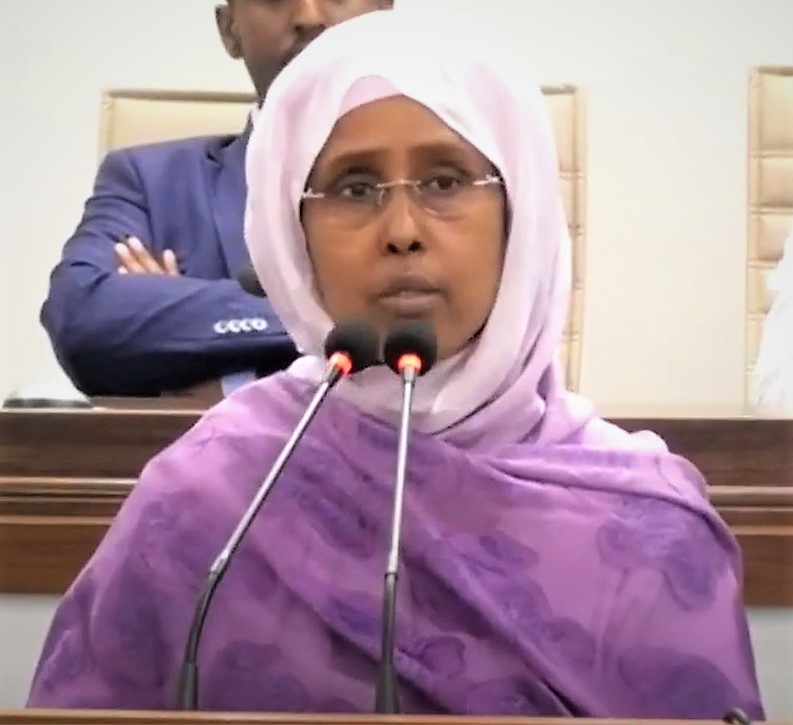
- Fawziya Abikar Nur speaks on City Somali TV in 2020

Minister for Health and Social Care
- Incumbent
- Assumed office 21 March 2017
- Prime Minister: Hassan Ali Khaire

Personal details
- Education: Somali National University; University of Bologna; Istituto Superiore di Sanità; Sapienza University of Rome
- Occupation: politician

Fawziya Abikar Nur (Somali: Foosiya Abiikar Nuur) is the Somali Federal Minister for Health and Social Care since March 2017. She is trained in law and public health and previously worked for the World Health Organization. She was in the post during the outbreak of the COVID-19 pandemic in Somalia and the arrival of the first vaccines.

== Life ==
She studied law at the Somali National University and in February 1985 she graduated. She then went to Italy where she completed a two-year fellowship in public law at the University of Bologna. She stayed in Italy and studied further at the Istituto Superiore di Sanità in Rome where she gained a master's degree in Health Services Management before she completed a doctorate at the Sapienza University of Rome in public health.

She worked at Somali National University as an assistant lecturer and later on poverty reduction training programmes at Sapienza and the Istituto Superiore di Sanità. From 2012 to 2016, she worked as a consultant for the World Health Organization in Somalia.

On 21 March 2017 she became the Somali Federal Minister for Health and Social Care and joined Prime Minister Hassan Ali Khaire's new cabinet. The Ministry of Health is based in Mogadishu.

In 2018 she spoke of her country's success in combating cholera and polio.

In April 2020, the first COVID-19 pandemic deaths in Somalia were recorded. Nur announced the death of the first victim who was a 58-year-old man. The second victim was Khalif Mumin Tohow who was a Minister of Justice for the Somali State of Hirshabelle. He had just returned from a visit to the United Kingdom.

On 8 April 2021, the official death toll from COVID-19 pandemic was 576. On 11 April 2021, the minister received the first coronavirus vaccines from China. The 200,000 doses of the Sinopharm BIBP vaccine were handed over by Chinese ambassador Qin Jian. Ten days later, Somalia received 300,000 doses of the Oxford-AstraZeneca vaccine from the COVAX initiative; Nur said that the vaccine would be sent to every region of Somalia and priority would be given to health care workers during the mass vaccination programme.

In April she also announced that the World Health Organization would be leading improvements in mental health provision. The project is targeting young Somalis who have been affected by conflict. There is little provision for mental health in a country where two-thirds of the population are below thirty years old and many have had to live with violence.
