= 2020 Mogadishu army base bombing =

Suicide car bombing in Somalia

Coordinates: 2°4′3″N 45°20′6″E

August 2020 Mogadishu bombing
- Part of the Somali Civil War
- Location: Mogadishu, Somalia
- Date: 8 August 2020
- Target: Military base
- Attack type: Suicide car bombing
- Weapon: Bomb
- Deaths: 8 (+1)
- Injuries: 14
- Perpetrator: Al-Shabaab

The August 2020 Mogadishu bombing was a suicide car bombing on 8 August 2020 at the gates of the 12th April Army Brigade military base close to the recently reopened Mogadishu sports stadium in the Warta Nabadda district of Mogadishu. The attack killed at least eight people and wounded fourteen others. The jihadist group al-Shabaab claimed responsibility for the attack.

== See also ==
- 2020 Afgooye bombing
