= 2021 Mogadishu mutiny =

2021 revolt in Somalia

Date	25 April – 6 May 2021
Location	Mogadishu, Somalia
Result	Withdrawal of rebels from Mogadishu

Belligerents
(Somalia) Somali Armed Forces	(Somalia) Mutineers

Commanders and leaders
Mohamed Abdullahi Mohamed	Saney Abdulle

Units involved
Armed forces from Mogadishu	Armed forces from Lower and Middle Shabelle

Strength
	Hundreds

Casualties and losses
- c. 24 killed, 60,000 – 100,000 displaced

On 25 April 2021, hundreds of Somali soldiers entered Mogadishu opposing extensions of the presidential mandate.

== Background ==
On 14 April 2021, acting President of Somalia Mohamed Abdullahi Mohamed signed a law which extended his mandate by two years. This was opposed by opposition leaders which called it "a threat to the stability, peace and unity" and by the international community.

== History ==
On 25 April 2021, soldiers - mainly from Hirshabelle - entered the Somali capital Mogadishu after president Mohamed approved two years extension of his term in office. Rebels seized northern part of the city clashing with pro-government forces in some neighborhoods. Pro-government soldiers attacked homes of former Somali president and opposition leader. By the end of the day government forces withdrew towards Villa Somalia.

On 6 May 2021, soldiers agreed to withdraw from Mogadishu after series of talks with the Prime Minister, held by the opposition. The police were set to take control of the city. On 8 May 2021, roads were reopened and rebels withdrew from Mogadishu in vehicles towards Lower and Middle Shabelle.
