= Zahra Mohamed Ahmad =

Somali human rights activist

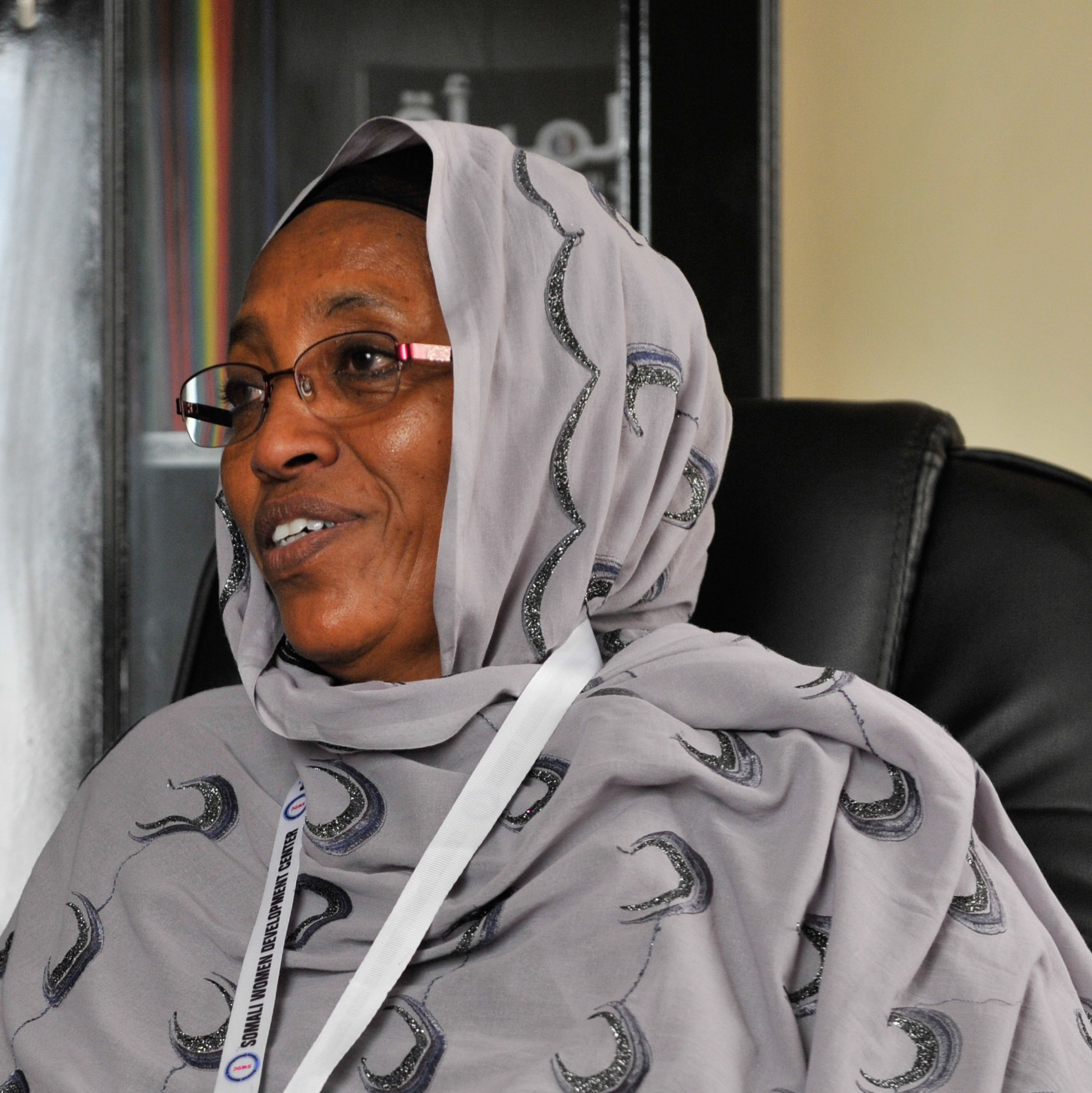
- in 2015
- Born: 1952 (age 73–74)
- Occupations: Lawyer and manager
- Known for: Leading the Somali Women Development Center in Mogadishu
- Children: 5

Zahra Mohamed Ahmad (born 1952) is a Somali human rights activist and lawyer. She is the founder of the Somali Women Development Center. She was awarded the International Women of Courage Award in 2021.

== Personal life ==
Ahmad was born in 1952 and had seven siblings. Her father was a police officer.

Ahmad became the deputy manager of the customs at Mogadishu Airport. She was married to a former airforce and commercial pilot General Mohamud Sheikh Ali and they had five children. In 1991 the structure of Somalia broke down and there was civil unrest. In the following year she and her family left, with regret, for Tanzania. They lived there until 2000. Somalia was still not a good place to live but Ahmed and her family moved back to help with the rebuilding.

== Career and education ==
She went to work encouraging schools to reopen and war lords to give up violence. The organisation she formed was called HINNA. Later, in 2000, she founded and led the Somali Women Development Center (SWDC) in Mogadishu.

In 2005 she returned to university to gain a degree in International and Sharia Law at Somalia University. They support women who are on remand or on trial and the survivors of sexual violence. The SWDC also report on abuse and violence in Somalia. The SWDC provides legal assistance and she is the main legal advisor. Her organisation's workers were harassed and threatened, her only son has died and she was also at risk. In 2013 two of SWDC's other lawyers were killed in an attack on Mogadishu's courthouse in which 27 other people died and 60 were wounded.

Her organisation established the Ceebla Crisis Line 5555. The line offers support in both Somali and English to those women who are involved with violence and abuse. The line had support from Lydia Wanyoto who was Head of the African Union Mission to Somalia and Somalia's first lady, Zahra Omar Hassan.

== Recognition ==
Ahmad was nominated by the US Ambassador to Somalia, Donald Yamamoto, and she was awarded the International Women of Courage Award in 2021. The award was presented virtually by the First Lady Jill Biden and the Secretary of State Antony Blinken on International Women's Day. There were fourteen living women given awards that year. The awardees were from fifteen countries as the 2021 awards included an extra seven women who had died in Afghanistan.
