= 2020 Galkayo bombing =

Suicide bombing in Somalia

- Location: 06.7525°N 47.4328°E; Abdullahi Isse stadium, Galkayo, Somalia
- Date: 18 December 2020
- Target: Mohamed Hussein Roble
- Attack type: Suicide bombing
- Deaths: 17 (+ bomber)
- Injuries: 20

The 2020 Galkayo bombing was a suicide bombing committed by Al-Shabaab in the city of Galkayo, Somalia. The bombing killed 17 including four high-ranking military commanders.

== Bombing ==
On 18 December 2020, a suicide bomber entered Abdullahi Isse stadium in Galkayo, Somalia where prime minister Mohamed Hussein Roble was set to speak at along with several high-ranking military commanders. The bombing killed 17 and wounded at least 20.

== Notable casualties ==
- Gen. Abdiaziz Abdullahi Qooje - commander of Division 21 of the Somali National Army
- Col. Mukhtar Abdi Adan - regional commander of Danab Brigade, Galmudug Division, 10th Brigade
- Maj. Dhamme Abdirahman Mire Ali - deputy commander of Danab Brigade, Galmudug Division, 10th Brigade
- Mohamud Yasin Ahmed - former mayor of Galkayo, Puntland Division
