= Ministry of Health (Somalia) =

Government ministry of Somalia

- Coat of arms of Somalia

Agency overview
- Formed: 1960
- Jurisdiction: Somalia
- Headquarters: Mogadishu
- Minister responsible: Dr. Ali Hajji Adam
- Agency executive: Dr. Ali Hajji Adam, Minister of Health
- Parent agency: Cabinet of Somalia
- Website: moh.gov.so/en/

The Ministry of Health is a ministry responsible for providing healthcare to the citizens of Somalia.

== History ==
Although this ministry has existed since independence a new iteration of this ministry was formed in 2012 at the formation of the federal government. The earliest Somali health minister was [] /ref> In 2018, services began being expanded to regions such as Benadir. The current Minister of Health is Fowsiya Nur.

== See also ==
- Healthcare in Somalia
- Agriculture in Somalia
