= Hudeidi =

Somali musician (1928–2020)

- Also known as: Boqorkii Cuudka (King of oud)
- Born: Ahmed Ismail Hussein Hudeidi; 15 April 1928; Berbera, British Somaliland (now Somaliland)
- Died: 8 April 2020 (aged 91) London, United Kingdom
- Genres: Somali
- Occupations: Singer-songwriter, composer, instrumentalist
- Instrument: Oud

Ahmed Ismail Hussein Hudeidi (Somali: Axmed Ismaaciil Xuseen Xudeydi), known as Hudeidi or Xudeydi, was a Somali musician who played the oud and composed songs.

== Early life and career ==
Hudeidi, who was descended from the Warsangeli tribe of Somalia, was born in Berbera in 1928 and raised in Yemen, where his father was a police sergeant. Hudeidi was always fascinated by music, and fell in love with the oud when his father took him to a party in Aden where an Arab man was playing the instrument. He learned how to play it from Abdullahi Qarshe, who advised Hudeydi's father to buy his son an oud and a pick as well as books and writing instruments for school.

During the 1950s and 1960s, Hudeidi lived in Yemen, Somalia, and Djibouti, playing the oud and getting into trouble for singing politically rebellious songs as well as from rival musicians. In 1973 he moved to the United Kingdom, where he performed at private functions such as family weddings and taught others how to play the oud.

He retired after a final concert at the Kayd Somali Arts and Culture centre in February 2020.

== Death ==
Hudeidi died on 8 April 2020 in London from COVID-19, eight days before his 92nd birthday.

== See also ==
- Music of Somalia
