= COVID-19 pandemic in Somalia =

- Disease: COVID-19
- Pathogen: SARS-CoV-2
- Location: Somalia
- First outbreak: Wuhan, Hubei, China
- Arrival date: 16 March 2020 (6 years, 2 months and 2 days)
- Confirmed cases: 27,334
- Recovered: 25,973
- Deaths: 1,361

Government website
- Ministry of Health- Somalia

The COVID-19 pandemic was confirmed to have reached Somalia on 16 March 2020 when the first case was confirmed in Mogadishu. The Somali Prime Minister, Hassan Ali Khaire announced that the government has set aside five million dollars to deal with the disease. The Somali Medical Association is concerned that the death toll in the country will be huge and that Somalia will not be able to recover from the economic effects due to poor working relations between central government and federal states which leads to lack of control by central government, as well and the lack of healthcare infrastructure. It has also been speculated that President Mohamed Abdullahi Mohamed may use the pandemic as an excuse to postpone elections. There have also been concerns over freedom of the press following arrests and intimidation of journalists who have been covering the pandemic in Somalia.

== Background ==
Somalia is in a state of protracted military conflict; the central government lacks control over large parts of the country, and is at odds with several of the regional governments. Some rural areas in the South are dominated by the terrorist group Al-Shabab, which has a history of disrupting humanitarian work. It faces widespread poverty and hunger, leaving people vulnerable to an outbreak.

Somalia's healthcare infrastructure is weak; it ranks 194th out of 195 in the Global Health Security Index. The country has less than 20 ICU beds available. One modern hospital with ventilators in Mogadishu is closed due to a political dispute.

== Timeline ==
=== 2020 ===
==== March ====
- On 16 March, the first case in Somalia was confirmed. Somalia's Health Ministry reported that a Somali citizen was returning home from China.
- By the end of March there had been five confirmed cases. Four cases remained active at the end of the month.

==== April ====
- On 7 April, the government reported the eighth confirmed case, a 58-year-old Somali man with no travel history.
- On 8 April, the Minister of Health, Fawziya Abikar Nur, confirmed the first death. On 12 April, Somalia confirmed its second death from coronavirus on Sunday, Khalif Mumin Tohow, justice minister of Hirshabelle state, succumbed in Mogadishu's Martini hospital a day after he tested positive in Jowhar. He was the country's second reported fatality due to COVID-19.
- On 14 April, 32 new cases were confirmed, all from Mogadishu. On 15 April, 20 more cases and three deaths were confirmed in Somalia.
- On 17 April, the Somali Minister of Health, Dr Fawziya Abikar Nur, said that 36 more cases tested positive (27 male, remainder female; 30 among the ages between 20 and 39 years (83%), and 6 among them aged between 40 and 59 years (14%)). Thus the total confirmed case number reached 116, and one more person had died.
- On 25 April, there were 390 confirmed cases and 18 deaths.
- During April there were 596 new cases, bringing the total number of confirmed cases to 601. The death toll was 28. There were 542 active cases at the end of the month.

==== May ====
- On 2 May, there were 601 confirmed cases and 28 deaths, although it was reported that the actual number of deaths may be significantly higher.
- There were 1375 new cases in May, raising the total number of confirmed cases to 1976. The death toll rose by 50 to 78. There were 1550 active cases at the end of the month.

==== June ====
- In mid June, Al-Shabab, which controls much of the rural area in the country, announced that it had set up a coronavirus treatment centre in Jilib, about 380 km (236 mi) south of the capital, Mogadishu.
- In June there were 948 new cases, bringing the total number of confirmed cases to 2924. The death toll rose by 12 to 90. There were 1924 active cases at the end of the month.

==== July ====
- There were 288 new cases in July, bringing the total number of confirmed cases to 3213. The death toll rose to 93. The number of recovered patients climbed to 1562, leaving 1557 active cases at the end of the month, a decrease by 19% from the end of June.

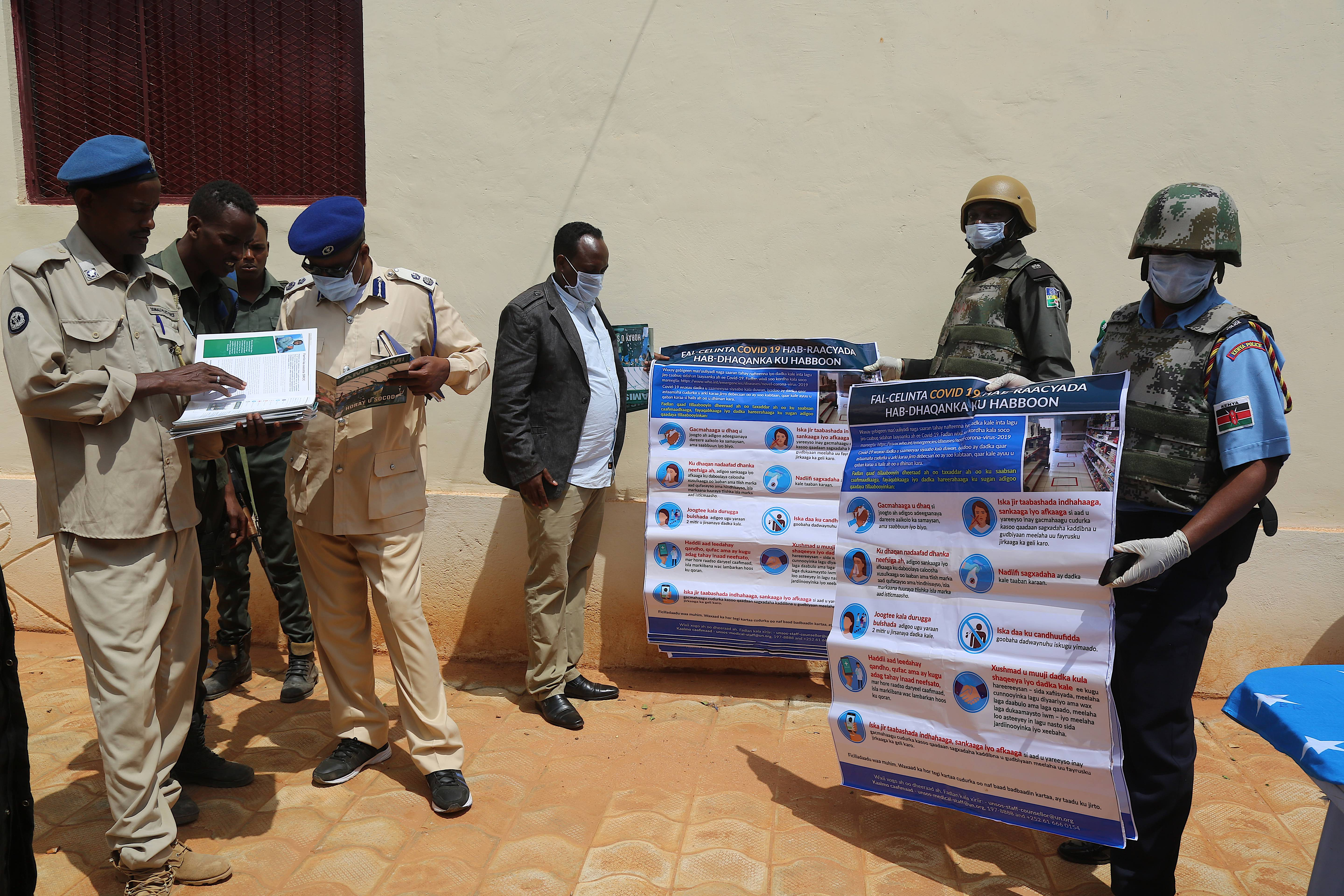
AMISOM Police officers hold COVID-19 awareness posters during a ceremony, 18 July 2020.

==== August ====
- There were 97 new cases in August, bringing the total number of confirmed cases to 3310. The death toll rose to 97. There were 732 active cases at the end of the month.

==== September ====
- There were 278 new cases in September, bringing the total number of confirmed cases to 3588. The death toll rose to 99. There were 543 active cases at the end of the month.

==== October ====
- There were 353 new cases in October, bringing the total number of confirmed cases to 3941. The death toll rose to 104. The number of recovered patients increased to 3185, leaving 652 active cases at the end of the month.

==== November ====
- There were 510 new cases in November, bringing the total number of confirmed cases to 4451. The death toll rose to 113. The number of recovered patients increased to 3417, leaving 921 active cases at the end of the month.

==== December ====
- There were 263 new cases in December, taking the total number of confirmed cases to 4714. The death toll rose to 130. The number of recovered patients increased to 3612, leaving 972 active cases at the end of the month.

=== 2021 ===
- On 11 April 2021, the health minister, Fawziya Abikar Nur, received the first Coronavirus vaccines from China. The 200,000 does were handed over by the Chinese ambassador. 10 days later Somalia received 300,000 doses of the Oxford-AstraZeneca vaccine doses from the COVAX initiative. Nur said that the vaccine would be sent to every region of Somalia and priority would be given to health care workers during the mass vaccination programme. By 27 April, a total of 122,235 vaccine doses had been administered.
- There were 70 new cases in January, 2473 in February, 4141 in March, 2517 in April, 745 in May, 286 in June, 457 in July, 2063 in August, 2514 in September, 2018 in October, 1018 in November, and 516 in December. The total number of cases was 4,784 in January, 7,257 in February, 11,398 in March, 13,915 in April, 14,660 in May, 14,946 in June, 15,403 in July, 17,466 in August, 19,980 in September, 21,998 in October, 23,016 in November, and 23,532 in December.
- The number of recovered patients increased to 3,666 in January, 3,808 in February, 4,819 in March, 5,847 in April, 6,562 in May, 7,246 in June, 7,533 in July, 8,531 in August, and 9,523 in September, leaving 988 active cases at the end of January, 3,210 at the end of February, 6,050 at the end of March, 7,355 at the end of April, 7,129 at the end of May, 6,925 at the end of June, 7,059 at the end of July, 7,958 at the end of August, and 9,346 at the end of September.
- The death toll rose to 239 in February, 529 in March, 713 in April, 769 in May, 775 in June, 811 in July, 977 in August, 1111 in September, 1208 in October, 1327 in November, and 1333 in December.

=== 2022 ===
- There were 729 new cases in January, 2052 in February, 97 in March, 75 in April, 80 in May, 238 in June, 217 in July, 117 in August, 79 in September, 27 in October, 43 in November, and 24 in December. The total number of cases stood at 24,261 in January, 26,313 in February, 26,410 in March, 26,485 in April, 26,565 in May, 26,803 in June, 27,020 in July, 27,137 in August, 27,216 in September, 27,243 in October, 27,286 in November, and 27,310 in December.
- The number of recovered patient increased to 13,182 in June, leaving 12,260 active cases at the end of the month.
- The death toll rose to 1335 in January, 1348 in February, and 1361 in March.

=== 2023 ===
- There were 8 new cases in January, 6 in February, 10 in March-April. The total number of cases was 27,318 in January, 27,324 in February, 27,334 in April.

== Responses ==
The government formed a task force to respond to COVID-19. Officials have had trouble obtaining medical equipment, but did successfully order some ventilators and ICU beds. Muslim clerics have worked to dispel myths about the virus. Some journalists have been arrested for allegedly spreading false information about the coronavirus pandemic.

On 15 March, the government banned passengers who had been to Iran, China, Italy, or South Korea in the past 14 days from entering Somalia. At that time the government had quarantined four people.

On 17 March, the government announced that schools and universities would be closed for 15 days effective from 19 March and that large gatherings were prohibited. However, people continued to gather in crowded areas, with a Mogadishu resident saying, "It is as though the schools were closed for public holiday."

The Somali Aviation Ministry ordered a suspension of all international flights for 15 days starting from Wednesday, 18 March, with the possibility of exceptions for humanitarian flights. The suspension affected khat imports from Kenya, leading to economic difficulties for khat sellers in Somalia and growers in Kenya. Also on 18 March, Prime Minister Hassan Ali Khaire announced $5 million had been allocated to address the pandemic.

Mohamed Mohamud Ali, chairman of Somali Medical Association, warned that the virus could kill many more people in Somalia than in China or Iran, because there are no testing kits in the country, and patients have to wait at least three days to get results from South Africa.

Al-Shabab leaders met to discuss COVID-19. Ahmed Khalif of Action Against Hunger warned that the extremist group has a history of blocking access for humanitarian workers, but may allow people to go elsewhere for treatment.

Twenty volunteer doctors from Somali National University went to Italy to help fight the outbreak there.

== Testing ==
Somalia initially lacked testing capacity, so test samples had to be sent abroad for processing, which delayed results. By August 2020 it had eight PCR testing sites and six testing centres using GeneXpert equipment.

== See also ==
- COVID-19 pandemic in Somaliland
- COVID-19 pandemic in Africa
- COVID-19 pandemic by country and territory
