= 2020 Afgooye bombing =

Suicide car bombing

- Part of the Somali Civil War (2009–present)
- Afgoye (Somalia)
- Location: Afgooye, Lower Shabelle, Somalia
- Date: 18 January 2020
- Attack type: Suicide car bombing
- Weapon: Car bomb
- Deaths: 4 (+1 suicide bomber)
- Injuries: 20

On 18 January 2020, a suicide car bombing killed four and injured at least 20 others in Afgooye, approximately 30 kilometres (19 mi) from the Somali capital, Mogadishu. Most of the casualties were police officers protecting Turkish contractors building a road. The al-Qaeda-linked extremist group al-Shabaab claimed responsibility for the attack.

== Background ==
Al-Shabaab began as the armed wing of the Islamic Courts Union (ICU), which later splintered into several smaller factions after its defeat in 2006 by Somalia's Transitional Federal Government (TFG) and the TFG's Ethiopian military allies.

The group often carries out attacks in Somalia, especially in and around Mogadishu. It less frequently attacks other African countries which support Somalia, especially neighbouring Kenya. Al-Shabaab carries out attacks to try to undermine Somalia's central government, which is backed by the United Nations and African Union peacekeeping troops, (AMISOM). On 14 October 2017, the worst attack by the organization killed more than 500 people with two bomb explosions that targeted Somalia's capital city Mogadishu.

== Turkish involvement in Somalia ==
Turkey is a large donor of humanitarian aid and reconstruction to Somalia. Turkey maintained an embassy in Mogadishu, Somalia's capital, until the outbreak of the Somali Civil War in 1991. During the drought of 2011, Turkey contributed over $201 million to the humanitarian relief efforts in the impacted parts of Somalia. Turkey assisted in the building of several hospitals, and helped renovate and rehabilitate the Aden Adde International Airport and the National Assembly building, among other initiatives.

== Attack ==
Al-Shabaab militants detonated a car bomb near Afgooye, which is in Lower Shabelle and is approximately 30 kilometres (19 mi) from Mogadishu. A Somali police commander said the intended target was Turkish construction workers. The suicide bomber sped into an area where the engineers and police were having lunch. Local witnesses described a "massive explosion" and "clouds of smoke". The casualties were mostly police officers providing security. Following the attack, al-Shabaab issued a statement, "We are behind the martyrdom of the suicide car bomb in Afgoye".

== Reactions ==
The Turkish Ministry of National Defense wrote on Twitter: "We curse and condemn in the strongest terms the bomb terror attack which targeted innocent civilians in Somalia".
