= 2019 Makka al-Mukarama Hotel attack =

Terrorist incident in Somalia

- Part of Somali civil war (2009-present)
- Location: Makka al-Mukarama Hotel, Mogadishu, Somalia
- Date: February 28, 2019
- Target: Somali officials
- Attack type: Car bombings, siege
- Deaths: 25+
- Injuries: 131+
- Perpetrator: al-Shabaab
- Defender: Somali National Army

On 28 February 2019 at least 30 people were killed and 131 others injured in three car bombing attacks followed by a siege of the Makka al Mukarama Hotel in Mogadishu. The cars exploded on the Makka al Mukarama road, which was busy at the time, adjacent to the hotel. Al-Shabaab has claimed responsibility for the attack.

== Background ==
The Makka al Mukarama Hotel is a hotel heavily frequented by Somali politicians and diaspora. The Makka al Mukarama Road, just adjacent to it, is the busiest and most heavily defended road in Mogadishu and is regularly targeted by al-Shabaab gunmen. The hotel had been attacked once before in 2015, in an attack that killed 20 people including Somalia's ambassador to the United Nations.

On the same day of the attack, American forces claimed they had killed at least 81 al-Shabaab militants in airstrikes throughout the country, with 20 militants killed in an airstrike in rural Hiraan and 35 killed in another airstrike near Beledweyne.

== Attack ==
On 28 February 2019, at 9 pm local time, al-Shabaab militants entered a house next to the Makka al Mukarama hotel after blowing up a car packed with explosives at its gate. The explosion occurred on the busy Makka al Mukarama Road during the evening rush hour.

The gunmen did not initially manage to enter the Makka al Mukarama hotel, so they stayed in the house next door, from where they kept firing at the special forces, soldiers and other gunmen who were sent to disarm and capture or liquidate them.

An hour after the first blast, two more car bombs exploded, one in front of the neighboring Hilaac UK restaurant and the other on the same road at the KM-4 junction. The militants were eventually able to enter the hotel complex by driving an SVBIED through the hotel's gates, while Somali National Army troops laid siege to it outside.

The resulting state of siege with the militants lasted for 20 hours, and Somali troops regained control of the hotel. At least 25 people were killed and 131 were injured in the bombings and the ensuing siege. Other reports put the death toll at above 30 killed.

== Aftermath ==
al-Shabaab claimed responsibility for the attack, saying the attack was a direct response to the American airstrikes and were to prove that American forces had not degraded the group's capabilities.

The siege was the longest time that al-Shabaab militants have been able to seize power in Mogadishu for any period of time since Somali troops backed by African Union peacekeepers ousted al-Shabaab from the capital in 2011. Dahir Mohamud Gelle, Somali information minister, explained the protracted siege by saying that the operation was designed to avoid civilian casualties.
