= 4 February 2019 Mogadishu bombing =

Terrorist attack in Somalia

- Part of Somali Civil War (2009–present)
- Location: Mogadishu, Somalia
- Date: 4 February 2019
- Attack type: Car bombing
- Deaths: 11+
- Injuries: 10+
- Perpetrator: Al-Shabaab

On 4 February 2019, at least 11 people were killed and 10 others injured in a car bombing attack at a shopping mall in Mogadishu, Somalia. The car was parked near the mall 20 minutes before the explosion. The attack happened in Hamar Weyne District, which was very busy at the time. Al-Shabaab claimed responsibility for the attack.
