= Hiraab =

Subclan of the Hawiye

Hiraab هراب
- Hawiye Somali Clan
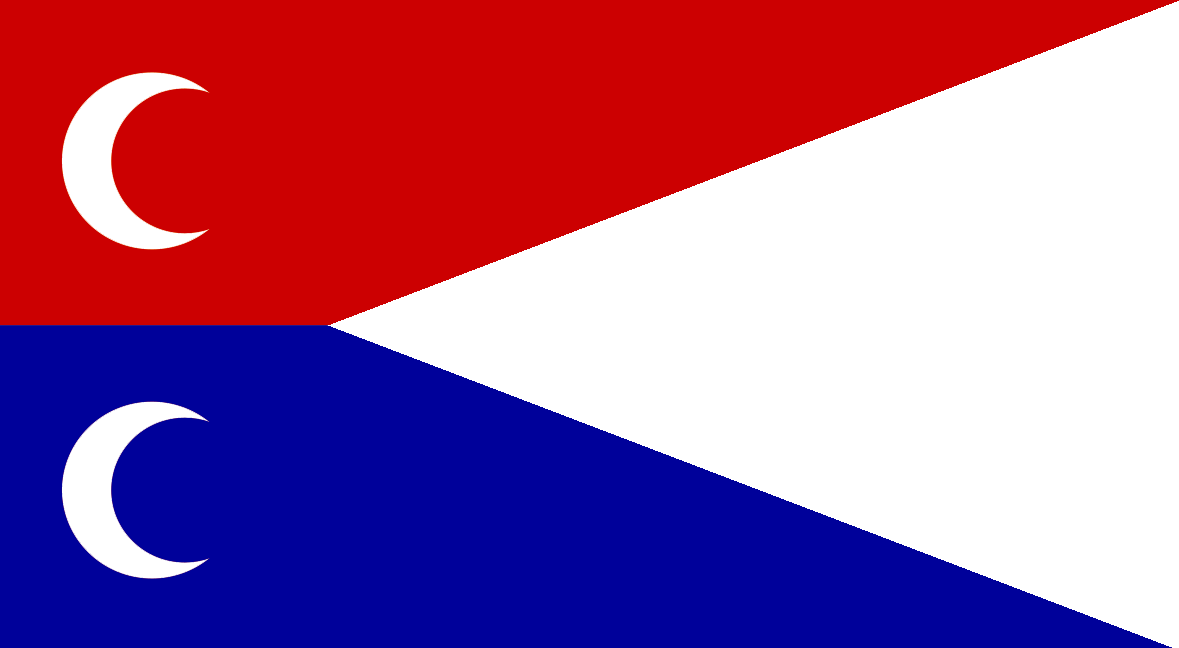
- Flag of the Hiraab Imamate
- Ethnicity: (Somalia) Somali
- Location: (Somalia) Somalia; Ethiopia; Kenya
- Descended from: Ubeyd Muhammad A. Dame
- Parent tribe: Hawiye
- Branches: Martiile Hiraab; Cimaateen Martiile; Wahariile Martiile; Dhuxul Martiile; Maashiye Martiile; Mahamud Hiraab Duduble; Mohamed Amal; Maqlisame; Ali Wahadsame; Awradeen; Aarsade; Madarki'is hiraab Habar Gidir; Sa'ad Madarki'is; Mohammed (Ayr) Madarki'is; Ibrahim (Saruur) Madarki'is; Sulaiman (Saleebaan) Madarki'is; Mudulood hiraab; Ciise Mudulood (Udeejen); Maxamed Mudulood (Cabdi Sheikh); Wa'weyteen Mudulood; Darandoole Mudulood; Hilibi Darandoole; Cismaan Darandoole; Ilaaway Cismaan; Moobleen Isman; Wacdaan Cismaan; Ali Osman (Abgaal); Harti (Maxamed); Wa'eysla; Wa'budhan
- Language: (Somalia) Somali (Arab League) Arabic
- Religion: Sunni Islam

The Hiraab clan (Somali: Hiraab, Arabic: هراب), is a prominent Somali clan belonging to the larger Hawiye clan. Renowned for its influential role, the Hiraab clan has produced numerous significant leaders within Somalia, including six presidents, the first president and prime minister of Somalia, and various other prominent figures. The clan's historical contributions include pioneering military leadership roles, and establishing a foundational influence in Somalia.

Mainly residing in central and southern Somalia, stretching from Galkayo to Kismaayo, the Hiraab clan also has a presence in Ethiopia and Kenya. Among their notable historical milestones, the Hiraab clan are the predominant inhabitants of Mogadishu, the capital city of Somalia. They have exerted substantial influence over the city, making substantial contributions across the city's diverse sectors.

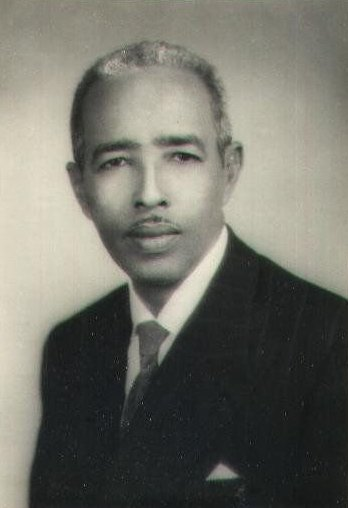
Aden Abdulle Osman, the first President of Somalia

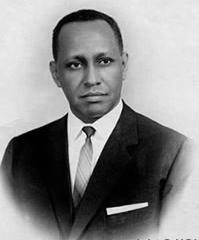
Abdullahi Issa Mohamud, the first PM of Somalia

== Etymology ==
The name Hiraab means the last half of the night in Somali. Traditionally, children born during that part of the night carry the name Hiraab, including the eponymous progenitor of the Hiraab clan.

== History ==
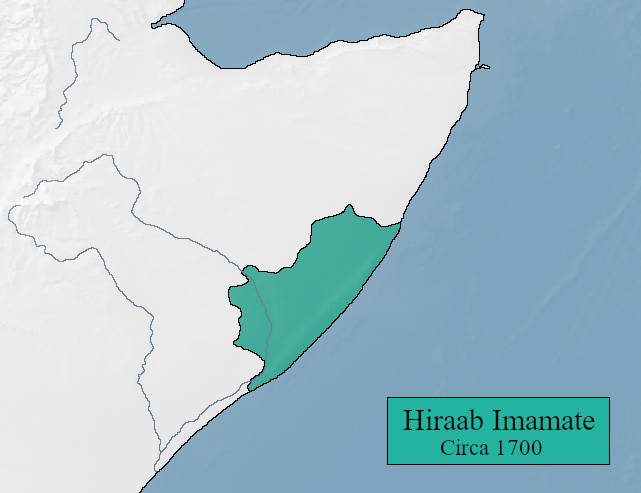
Hiraab Imamate map in 1700

The first clan to ever challenge the Ajuuraan rulers was the Darandoolle clan a section of Hiraab.

In The Ajuuraan had decreed: “At the wells in our territory, the people known as Darandoolle and the other Hiraab cannot water their herds by day, but only at night.” … Then all the Darandoolle gathered in one place. The leaders decided to make war on the Ajuuraan. They found the imam of the Ajuuraan seated on a rock near a well called Ceel Cawl. They killed him with a sword. As they struck him with the sword, they split his body together with the rock on which he was seated. He died immediately and the Ajuuraan migrated out of the country. In another variation of the story, a young Darandoolle warrior was born with a gold ring on his finger, a sign of his future preeminence. The Darandoolle then rallied around their young leader, who eventually assumed the title of Imam of the Hiraab and took up residence in Muqdisho.

The mother of Hiraab was Faduma Karanle, the sister of the Murusade clan. By 1700, the Hiraab and other clans occupied a large territory stretching the interior from the Shabelle valley to the arid lands of Mudug and to the coastal areas of Mogadishu towards Hobyo. After the immediate fall of the Ajuuraan, the Hiraab established an independent rule, under the Yacquub dynasty, for at least two centuries. Called Regno di Magadozo or the Kingdom of Magadoxo in official medieval bulletins, at their peak they would go on to dominate what became Greater Benadir.

== Distribution ==
The Hiraab clan predominantly inhabits the central and southern regions of Somalia, including Galgaduud, Mudug, Middle Shabelle, Hiiraan, Banadir, Lower Shabelle, and, to a lesser extent, Sool, Lower Juba, and the Somali region of Ethiopia.

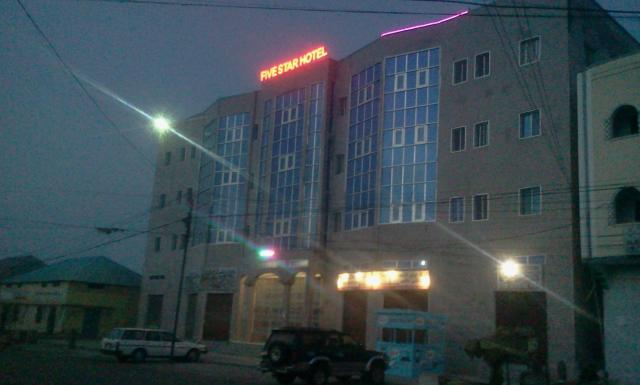
Galkayo, Galmudug

In Mudug, the Sacad sub-clan of the Habar Gidir exerts political and local dominance over the Galkayo and the Hobyo district and city.

the Saruur of the Habar Gidir are the majority in the Harardhere district.

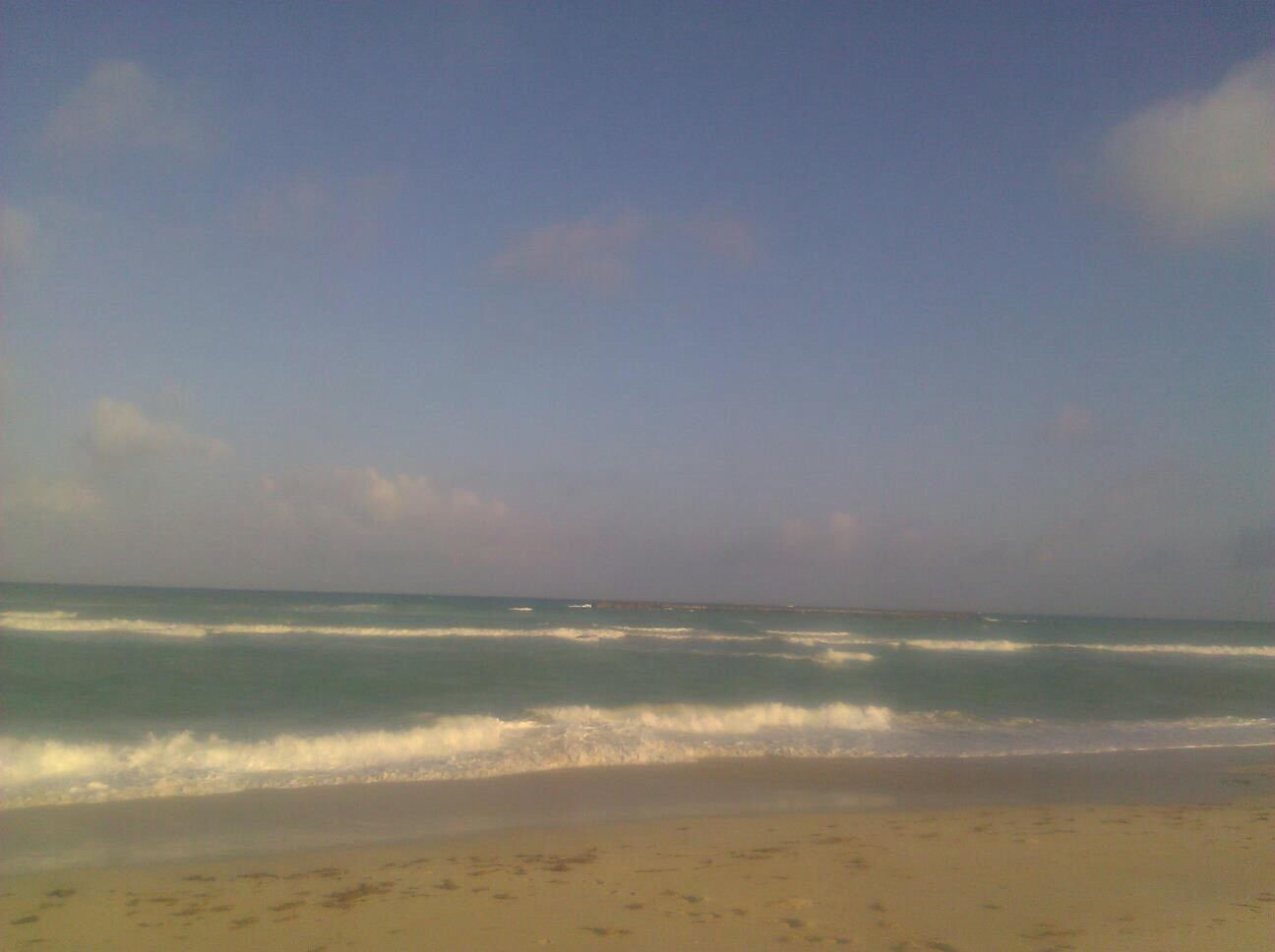
Hobyo, Galmudug

The Galgaduud region is a stronghold of the Hiraab clan, forming the majority in five out of sevendistricts and the second largest group in the remaining two. They hold significant influence and control over these districts, occupying most key positions. The Saleeban sub-clan dominates the Adado, the Ayr sub-clan is the majority in the Dusmareb and Guriel districts, the Waceysle sub-clan leads in the El Dher district, and the Duduble sub-clan is predominant in the El Buur district. The Ayr sub-clan also extends into the Abudwak and Balanbale districts, holding various positions and key towns.

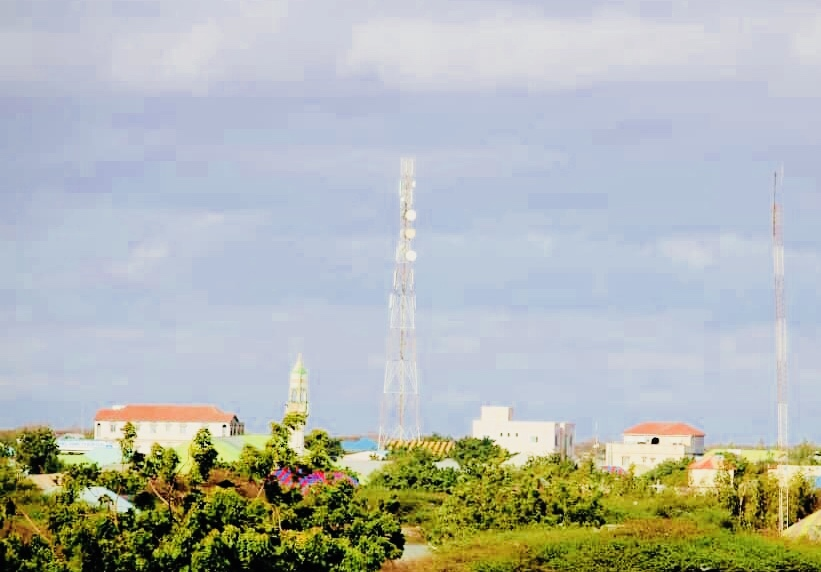
A photo of the Guriel town

In the Middle Shabelle region of the Hirshabelle state, the Abgaal sub-clan forms a majority, controlling the governor's office and other key districts, including the fertile lands of the Jowhar] and Bal'ad districts and the tourist-attractive coastal towns near Mogadishu. In Hiiraan, the Hiraab live in three out of eight districts: Gerijir, Mataban, where the Habar Gidir form a plurality, and Jawiil district, which is inhabited by the Udejeen.

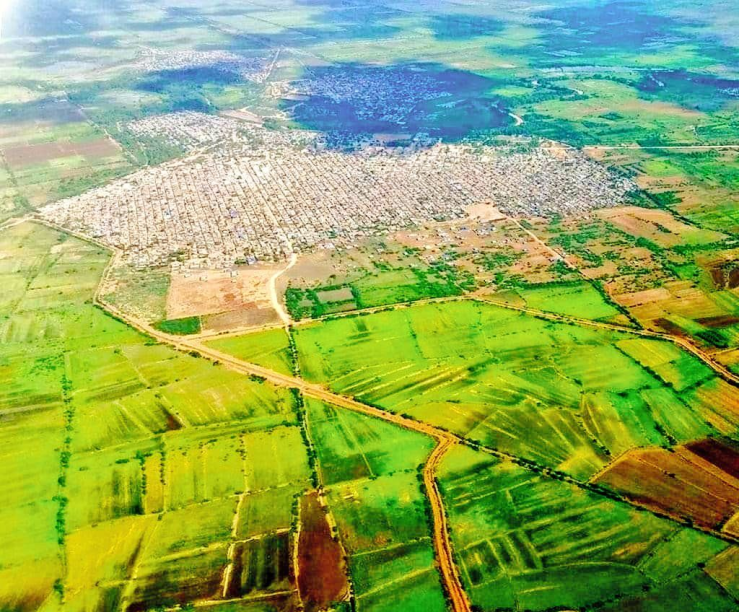
Jowhar District

In Banadir, the Hiraab are concentrated around the national capital Mogadishu, and were the earliest inhabitants. They primarily occupy 16 of the 18 districts, holding district governor positions in 12 and vice-governor roles in the rest. They also have a presence in the other 2 districts, which are the Deynile and Hamarweyne districts, and hold vice-governor roles in them as well. The Hiraab clan has established itself as a significant force in the city, holding key positions such as the mayor, head of police, head of security services, and head of the courts. The community has been prominent in Mogadishu since the 17th century with the Hiraab Imamate.

In the Somali Region of Ethiopia, the Hiraab inhabit key districts and towns near the Hiiraan and Somalia border, including Ferfer, where the Udejeen clan resides. The Habar Gidir live near the Galmudug border in towns like Labobaar in the Korahey zone. The Ayr sub-clan's Fiqishini members are found in the Dollo zone's Qararo Hawiye town and the Erer zone. The Sheekhaal sub-clan lives in Afdher's Raaso district and areas near the capital Jiiga, such as Gursum. They also inhabit parts of Oromia.

In Lower Juba, the Sheekhaal sub-clan resides in major districts such as Hoosingo and Jamaame. In Lower Shabelle, their communities stretch from Afgoye, Merca, and Baraawe, inhabiting the lush lands of the region. The Abgaal also have a presence in some districts of Lower Jubba, such as Turdho. In the Sool and Togdheer regions of Somalia and Somaliland, the Fiqishini sub-clan of the Ayr lives in key cities like Adhi'adeye and constitutes a portion of Buuhoodle city in Togdheer.

== Hiraab sub-clans ==
Ali Jimale Ahmed outlines the Hiraab clan genealogical tree in The Invention of Somalia:

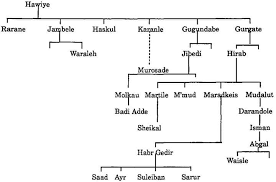
Hawiye clan tree

- Hiraab
  - Mudulood Hiraab
    - Ciise Mudulood (Udeejen)
      - Abokor
        - Adan Yacquub
        - Ali Yacquub
          - Reer Raage
        - Yusuf Yacquub
          - Xasan Yusuf (Reer Ugaas)
          - Macalin Maxamuud
            - Xersi Macalin
            - Kheyre Macalin
            - Siyaad Macalin
            - Dudub Macalin
            - Faatax Macalin
      - Abaadir
        - Maxamed Samatar
    - Wa'weyteen Mudulood
    - Maxamed Mudulood (Cabdi Sheikh)
    - Darandoole Mudulood
      - Hilibi Darandoole
        - Tolweyne
          - Dhagoweeyne
          - Reer Duleey
          - Gacal Maxamed
          - Cumar Caalin
          - Reer Faqi
          - Ximin Nacbe
        - Yabadhaale
          - Guudcadde
          - Abroone
          - Cosoble
          - Gacal Waaq
          - Galbe
      - Cismaan Darandoole
        - Wacdaan Cismaan
          - Yabarow
          - Ali Yaberow
          - Bana Yaberow
            - Maalinle
              - Maxamed Maalinle
              - Ibrahim Maalinle
                  - Maxaad Mooldheere
                  - Abuukar Mooldheere
                - Yabar Ilkagaduud
            - Samakaay
            - Warqatinle
            - Warqab
        - Moobleen Isman
          - Magacle Moobleen
            - Yabar Magacle
            - Cool Magacle
            - Xayaale Magacle
          - Abidig Moobleen
            - Tolweyne
            - Yabadhaale
            - Maqalsame
        - Abgaal
          - Harti (Maxamed, Bah Sarjeele (Ajuuraan)
            - Caleed Harti
              - Warsangeli Caleed
                - Cumar
                - Cabdalle
            - Suul Harti
              - Caroone Muuse
                - Maxamed Caroone
                  - Gaabane Maxamed
                    - Agoonyar
                    - Owbakar
                  - Yabar Maxamed
                - Nugaale (Habar Nugaal)
                - Cabdalla Caroone
                - Saleeban Caroone
            - Ciise Harti
          - Wacbudhan (Bah Hintire Bal'ad (Ajuuraan)
            - Yonis Danweyne
              - Galmaax Yonis
                - Yusuf Galmaax
                  - Muuse Yuusuf
                    - Maxamed Muuse
                    - Wehliye Muuse
                - Cumar Galmaax
                  - Celi Cumar
                  - Reer Mataan
                - Abdulle Galmaax
              - Xuseen Yonis
                - Sahal Koraaye
                - koshin sahal
                - heyle sahal
              - Adan Yonis
              - Maxamed Yonis
            - Kabaale Wacbudhan
              - Saleeban Muse
              - Xeyle Muse
            - Dauud
              - Isaaq Dauud
              - Yusuf Dauud
          - Waceysle (Warculus, Bah Hintire Bal'ad (Ajuuraan)
            - Saleeban Waceysle
              - Cumar Saleeban
                - Dhagaweyne Cumar
                - Faqay Cumar
                - Cabdalle Cumar
                  - Cali Gaaf
                  - Qombor
                    - Absuge
                      - Dhagacase Qombor
                    - Macalin Dhiblaawe
                - Ogale Cumar
              - Abdirahman Saleban
            - Jibraail Waceysle
            - Haaruun Waceysle
          - Abdulle Abgaal (Jurtub, Bah Sarjeele (Ajuuraan)
          - Mohamud Abgaal (Atwaaq, Bah Sarjeele (Ajuuraan)
        - Ilaaway Cismaan
          - Weheliye
            - Makaraan
            - Xabeey
            - Xalane
            - Aamin
              - Xuseen Aamin
              - Gacal Aamin
              - Iidle Aamin
  - Habar Gidir
    - Sa'ad
      - Awarere Sa'ad(Cawareere)
        - Odow
          - Da'ud
            - Muuse Culus
              - Reer Jalaf
              - Reer Nim'ale
            - Mahad Culus
              - Reer Barqadle
              - Reer Qurdhale
            - Mohamed Culus (Reer Mohamed)
        - Wuqujire
          - Maxamed (Lugayare)
          - Maxamud (Sinoole)
          - Uways Wuqujire
            - Hassan Uways (Reer Faraale)
            - Xuseen Uways (Bahwayn)
          - Xayloow
            - Cali (Indhayar)
              - Culus
                - Reer Hilowle
                - Reer Ayaanle
                - Abakar Culus
        - Abdalle Sa'ad(Cabdalle)
          - Adan Abdalle
            - Ali Abdalle
              - Sufi Ali
              - Ahmed Ali
            - Abrone Abdalle
            - Halane Abrone
              - Omar Halane
                - Guled Omar
                - Yusuf Omar
                  - Jibril Yusuf
                  - Ayanle Yusuf
                    - Abdi Ayanle
                    - Jamac Ayanle
                    - Mohamed Ayanle
                    - Geedi Ayanle
                    - Sayid Ayanle
          - Agane Abdalle
            - Malinle Agabe
              - Bare Malinle
              - Fiqi Malinle
                - Daoud Fiqi
                - Ismail Fiqi
                - Ishaq Fiqi
                  - Abdi Ishaq
                  - Abdille Abdi
                      - Jamac Abdille
                        - Qalaf jama
              - Farah Malinle
          - Abrone Agane
          - Abokor Agane
    - Mahamed (Ayr)
      - Wa'e/Wace Mahamed(Yabadhaale)
        - Sunad-Nabi Wa'e
          - Caaldheere
      - Mu'le/Mucle Mahamed(Tolweyne)
        - Abti-idig Mucle
          - Warwaaq Abti-idig(HabarAji)
            - Xaryanle Abti-idig(HabarAji)
            - Daaud(Sabuuh) Abti-idig(Habar-Islaaleed)
            - Dhowrakace Abti-idig(Habar Islaaleed)
              - Bilaal Dhowrakace(Yabardhowrakace)
                - Dhalow Dhowrakace
                - Madahdiir Dhowrakace
                - Dangub Dhowrakace
                - Samadoor Dhowrakace
                  - Hassan Samadoorte
                  - Ahmed Samadoorte
                    - Caroole Ahmed
                      - Bah Ina-Hassan
                        - Babaanshe Caroole
                        - Suubiye Caroole
                        - Ayaanle Caroole
                      - Bah Ina Suufi Kobdheer
                        - Caalin Caroole(Reer Ugaas)
                        - Cabsiiye Caroole
    - Saleban
      - Farah Saleebaan (Farax)
        - Heysow
          - Reer Warfaa
          - Bah-Abgaal
          - Saciid Ebakar
          - Reer Xirsi
          - Reer Gaafow
          - Maxamed Cabdi
            - Reer Warsame
            - Reer Muuse
            - Reer Caraaye
      - Warsame Saleebaan (Dashame)
        - Obokor
        - Gaabane
          - Maxamed
            - Rooble
              - Farax Rooble
              - Maxamed Rooble
                - Reer Ugaas
          - Cabdi (Cabdi-Gaab)
    - Saruur
      - Nabadwaa Saruur
        - Kubeenshe
          - Wehliye
          - Cali Wehliye
            - Faarax Cali
              - Cali Faarax
                - Rooble Cali
                - Jimcaale Cali
            - Maxamed Cali
              - Xuurshe Maxamed
              - Adan Maxamed
              - Odawaa Maxamed
              - Maxamuud Maxamed
        - Xuseen Nabadwaa
          - Birkaanle Xuseen
            - Ibraahim Birkaanle
              - Cumar Ibraahim
                - Xalane Cumar
                - Odasuge Cumar
            - Maxamuud Birkaanle
              - Rooble Maxamuud
      - Wacdaan Saruur
  - Duduble
    - Maxamed Camal
    - Maqlisame
    - Celi Waxadsame
    - Awradeen
    - Aarsade
  - Martiile Hiraab
    - Cimaateen Martiile
    - Wahariile Martiile
    - Dhuxul Martiile
    - Maashiye Martiile

== Important members ==
=== Politics ===
- Aden Adde, the first president of Somalia
- Hassan Sheikh Mohamud, Current President of Somalia and President from 2012 to 2016
- Abdullahi Issa Mohamud, the first PM of Somalia
- Ali Mahdi Muhammad, President of Somalia from 1991 to 1997
- Mohamed Farrah Aidid, Former President of Somalia
- Abdiqasim Salad, President of Somalia from 2000 to 2004
- Sharif Sheikh Ahmed, President of Somalia from 2009 to 2012
- Ali Mohammed Ghedi, Former prime minister of the Transitional Federal Government
- Omar Finnish, former mayor of Mogadishu and Governor of Banaadir
- Mohamed Nur, former mayor of Mogadishu and Governor of Banaadir
- Abdirahman Omar Osman, former mayor of Mogadishu and Governor of Banaadir
- Hassan Mohamed Hussein, former mayor of Mogadishu and Governor of Banaadir
- Nur Hassan Husein, Former prime minister of the Transitional Federal Government
- Ali Ghedi, Former prime minister of the Transitional Federal Government
- Hussein Kulmiye Afrah, vice-president of Somalia under the Siad Barre Regime
- Mohamed Hussein Roble, former prime minister of Somalia
- Abdulrahman Kinana, Tanzanian politician and first speaker of the EAC

=== Military leaders and personnel ===
- General Daud Abdulle Hirsi, First Commander-In-Chief of the Somali National Army Forces
- Salaad Gabeyre Kediye, Major General in the Somali Military
- General Mohamed Nur Galaal, Frunze Trained Major General, Former Deputy Defence Minister, Chief Architect of the 1964 Ethiopian–Somali Border War and the Ogaden War 1977, Commander of the 1990 Somali Rebellion in Mogadishu, Transitional National Government of Somalia Head of National Commission for Security and Ahlu Sunna Waljama'a Paramilitary Advisor, Four Time War Hero
- Dahir Adan Elmi, Chief of Somali Armed Forces, Major General and the Commander of Qabdri-Daharre Battalion in Somalia-Ethiopian War in 1977 and awarded a Medal of Honour. He is regarded as the longest-serving General in the Somali Army
- Abdi Hasan Awale Qeybdiid, Longest reigning Police Commissioner, dubbed Tiger Abdi in the infamous Black Hawk Down
- Hassan Dahir Aweys, Decorated Colonel of the Ogaden War, Founder of the Islamic Courts Union
- Ahmed Jila'ow Adow, former Director of the Somali Secret Services and a Mayor of Mogadishu in 1991
- Mohammed Hussein Ali, Former Commissioner of the Kenya Police
- Mohamed Ibrahim Liqliiqato, prominent military leader

=== Leading intellectuals ===
- Caaqil dheryadoobe, Linguist and icon Of Somali History
- Hussein Sheikh Ahmed Kaddare, Linguist, Author of the 1952 Kaddariya script
- Ismail Jim'ale Osoble, Human Rights Lawyer, Journalist, Cabinet Minister, Author of the 1990 Somali Manifesto
- Farah Weheliye Addo, Politician, Chairman of the Somali Football Association, Council for East and Central Africa Football Associations, Somali Olympic Committee and vice-president of the African Football Confederation
- Abdirahman Yabarow, Editor-in-Chief of the VOA Somali Service
- Abdi Mohamed Ulusso, Writer, Historian, 2004 Presidential Candidate
- Elman Ali Ahmed, Entrepreneur and Social Activist
- Ali Jimale Ahmed, Educator at the City University of New York

=== Athletes ===
- Omar Mohamed, professional footballer
- Abdi Nageeye, World Champion Marathon

=== Musicians ===
- Saciid Mire Xeydar, Famous Somali Singer
- Hasan Adan Samatar, famous Somali singer.
- Axyaa Waddani, SYL poet
- Abdi Bashir Indhobuur, poet
- Farah Gololeey, poet and composer.
- K'naan, Somali poet and first Somali to receive a Grammy award.
- Magool, Somali singer.
