= Abgaal =

Somali clan family

أبگال Abgaal
- Hawiye Somali Clan
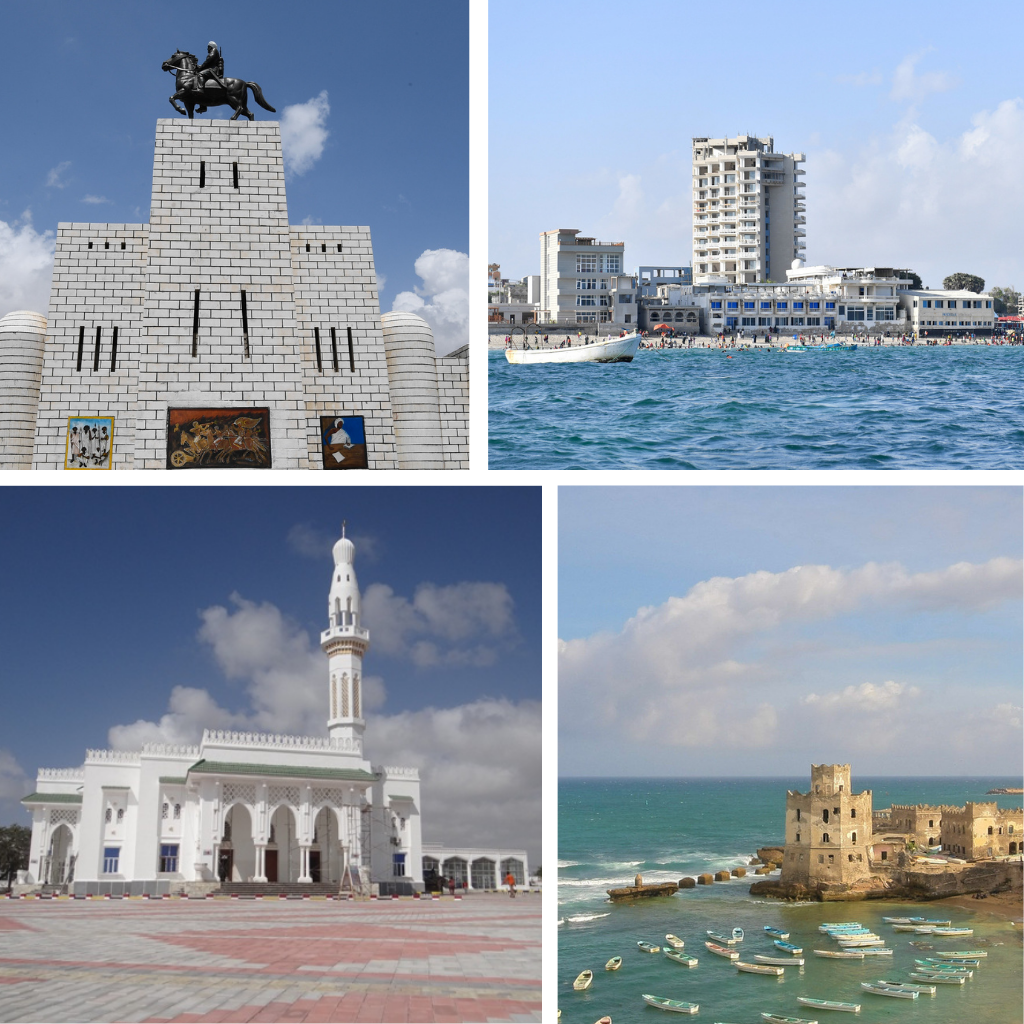
- The Abgaal's traditional stronghold, Mogadishu, the capital of Somalia.
- Ethnicity: (Somalia) Somali
- Location: Somalia
- Parent tribe: Mudulood
- Language: (Somalia) Somali (Arab League) Arabic
- Religion: Sunni Islam

The Abgaal (Somali: Abgaal; Arabic: أبگال) are a Somali sub-clan of the Hawiye and the even larger Samaale clan. This prominent Somali clan, despite being one of the youngest in Somalia, is one of the most significant in the nation's history and has given rise to many notable figures, including three presidents, including the current one as well as the founding father of the Somali military. Their stronghold is the capital city of Somalia, Mogadishu, where they are known to be the earliest inhabitants and they currently constitute the majority of the population there.

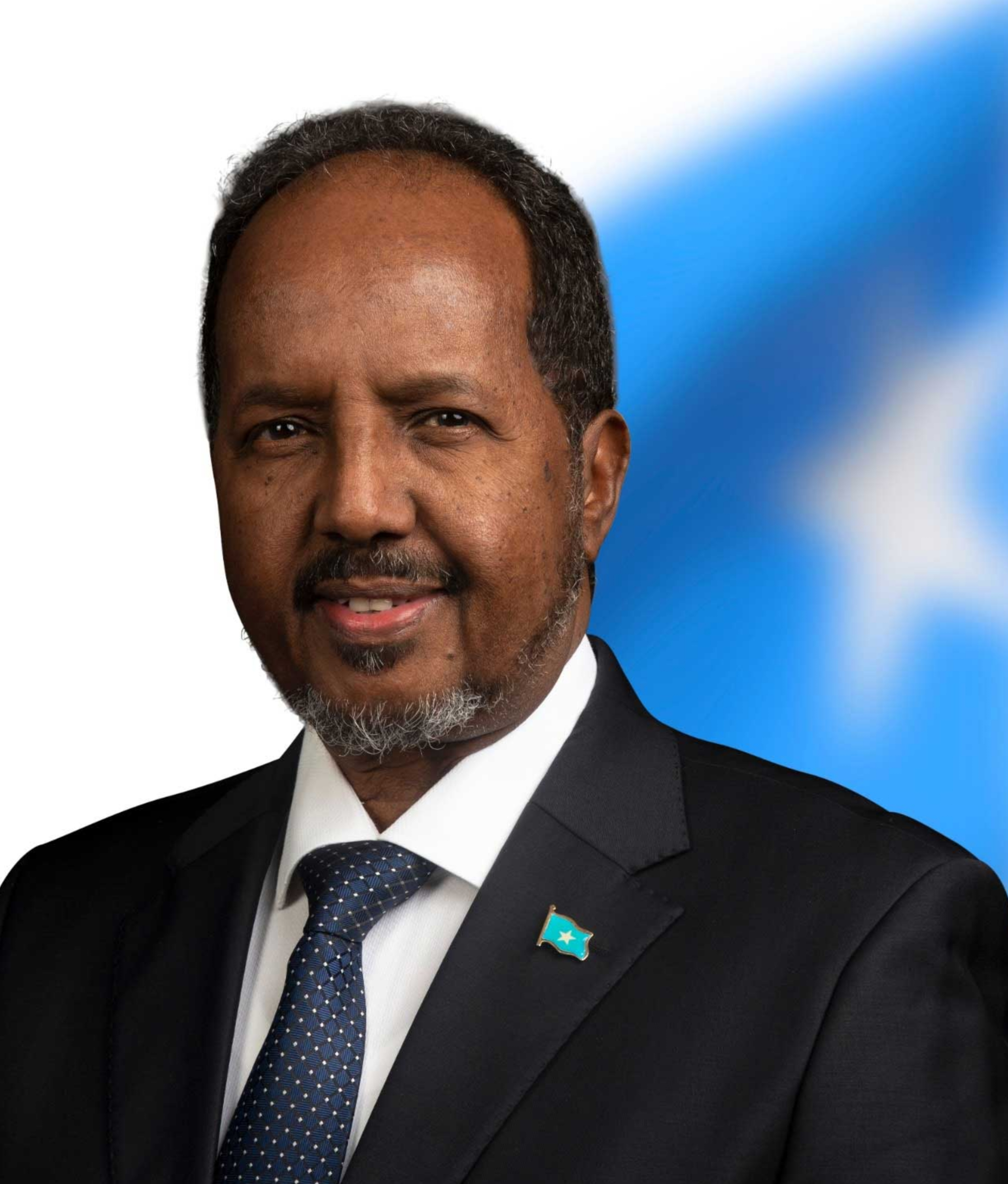
The current president of Somalia, Hassan Sheikh Mohamud, hails from this clan.

== History ==
The Abgaal are part of the Mudulood and the even larger Hiraab clan. The Hiraab consists of the Mudulood, Habar Gidir, Sheekhaal and Duduble. Besides the Abgaal, Mudulood includes Wacdaan, Moobleen, Hiilibi and Udeejeen. The Imam of both the Mudulood and Hiraab traditionally hails from the Abgaal. Currently Imam Mohamed Yusuf is the Imam of the Mudulood and also carries the dual position as Imam of the Hiraab.

=== Origins ===
The Italian scholar of Somali and Ethiopian studies Enrico Cerulli, discusses the origin story of the name Abgaal in his book How a Hawiye tribe used to live. Abgaal's father was Osman Darandolle of the Hiraab sub-section of the Hawiye. His mother was Faduma Sarjeele, of the house of Gareen, part of the Ajuran clan which headed the Ajuran Sultanate in which her household was part of.

The mother of Hirabä was Faduma Karanlä. The mother of Abgal was Faduma Sargellä, who was an Aguran. She was espoused by 'Isman Darandollä. By him she had a son, who was called by the name 'Ali 'Isman. Later one went to Sargellä Garën. A learned old man went to him. He said: 'O noble Sargellä, I saw in the books that the children of the boy born to your daughter Faduma will chase your children from the earth. I saw it in the books.' 'Did you see these things?’ 'Yes, I saw them,’ he answered. 'So be it!’ the noble Sargellä replied; and into his heart came the thought: 'Rather than that your children, whom you have begotten, be killed, the son of your daughter might rather die!’ This came into his heart. After this he prepared two different amulets, one good and one bad. The bad one would kill the one who drank it. The good one would protect from any evil of this world. Then he went to his daughter. 'My Faduma, I am bringing you these two amulets: this one here – and it was the good one – you drink; and the other one – and it was the bad one – give to your son 'Ali 'Isman!’ The girl took the two amulets; but when it came to drinking them, she made a mistake! Faduma Sargellä drank the bad one and died immediately. 'Ali 'Ismän drank the good one and survived. Sargellä went back to the hut and saw his daughter dead. And the boy, when he heard his grandfather arrive, ran to the side of a saddle camel and hid behind it. 'Oh 'Ali, oh 'Ali! Come! I am your grandfather!’ Sargellä cried out, looking for the boy. 'You are not my grandfather ( abkäy ), my grandfather is the camels.' The camels ( gel ) in the language of one time were called gal. So afterwards he ('Ali 'Isman) had the name of Ab-gal ('Camel-grandfather')." The tradition substantially recalls the ancient fights between the Abgal, nomadic pastoralists who from places farther north tried to open a way to the river, and the Aguran, who dominated the region of the Middle Webi. This historical content, of course, has been adapted in popular dress with the theme, so widespread in the folklore of quite different peoples, of the prediction of the unborn child destined to drive the reigning prince from the throne. 'In this tradition Abgal has, besides his Somali name, which is explained, also a Mussulman name, 'Ali 'Isman. It does not seem necessary to me to suppose that the name 'Ali replaced the Somali one of Abgal in the genealogies in order to make them more Islamized, as one might say. The custom of several names for one single person, among which names, for the Mussulmans, are found an Arab one and one (or more) in the local language, is common in East Africa, even now.'

—Enrico Cerulli, How a Hawiye Tribe use to Live

=== Traditional role in Mogadishu ===
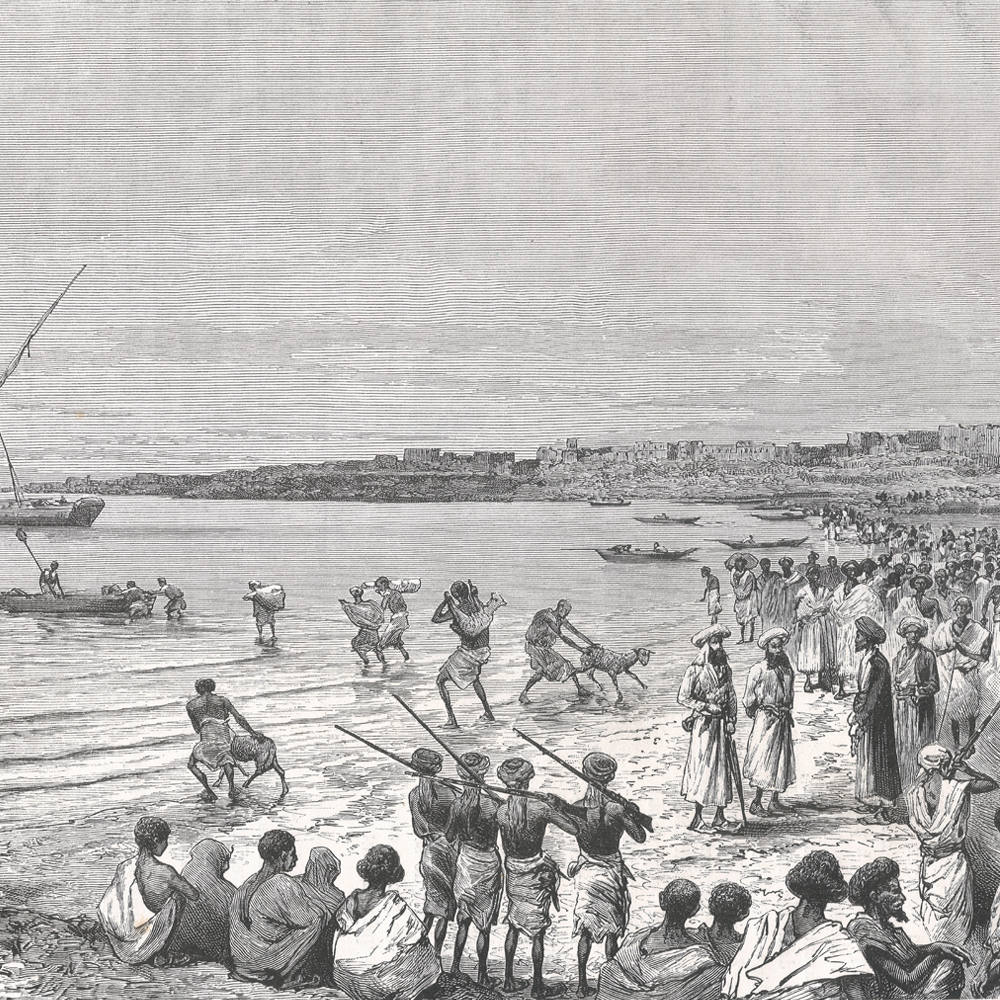
Picture of Old Mogadishu from 1885.

The Mogadishu region has a rich historical background, thought to encompass the site of the Sarapion port city, which engaged in trade with the Greeks during the 1st century AD. This assertion is strengthened by archaeological findings and written records. By the thirteenth century, Ibn Sa'id described Mogadishu, Merca and Barawa located in the Benadir coast had become Islamic and commercial centers in the Indian Ocean. He said the local people in the Benadir coast and the interior were predominantly inhabited by Somalis with a minority of Arab, Persian and Indian merchants living in the coastal towns. These Somalis are assumed to be the Hawiye clan, particularly the Gorgarte sub-clan.

As the Abgaal are a relatively young clan, with their founder dating from the 1500s, they can be considered one of the earliest known clans in the Benadir coast. Mogadishu is the traditional territory of the Reer Mataan sub-clan of the Abgaal today. The earliest history of Abgaal in Mogadishu is thought to be from the sixteenth century.

For example, clan traditions indicate that the Abgaal Darandoolle (a section of the Hawwiyya clan family) began to arrive in the hinterland of Mogadishu while the Muzaffar dynasty was ruling that town, sometime in the sixteenth century. Manuscripts from Mogadishu record around the same time the appearance of Abgaal nomads in the immediate interior, and shortly thereafter Somali (Abgaal) names began to appear in the previously Arab and Persian-dominated genealogies of the town's leading families.

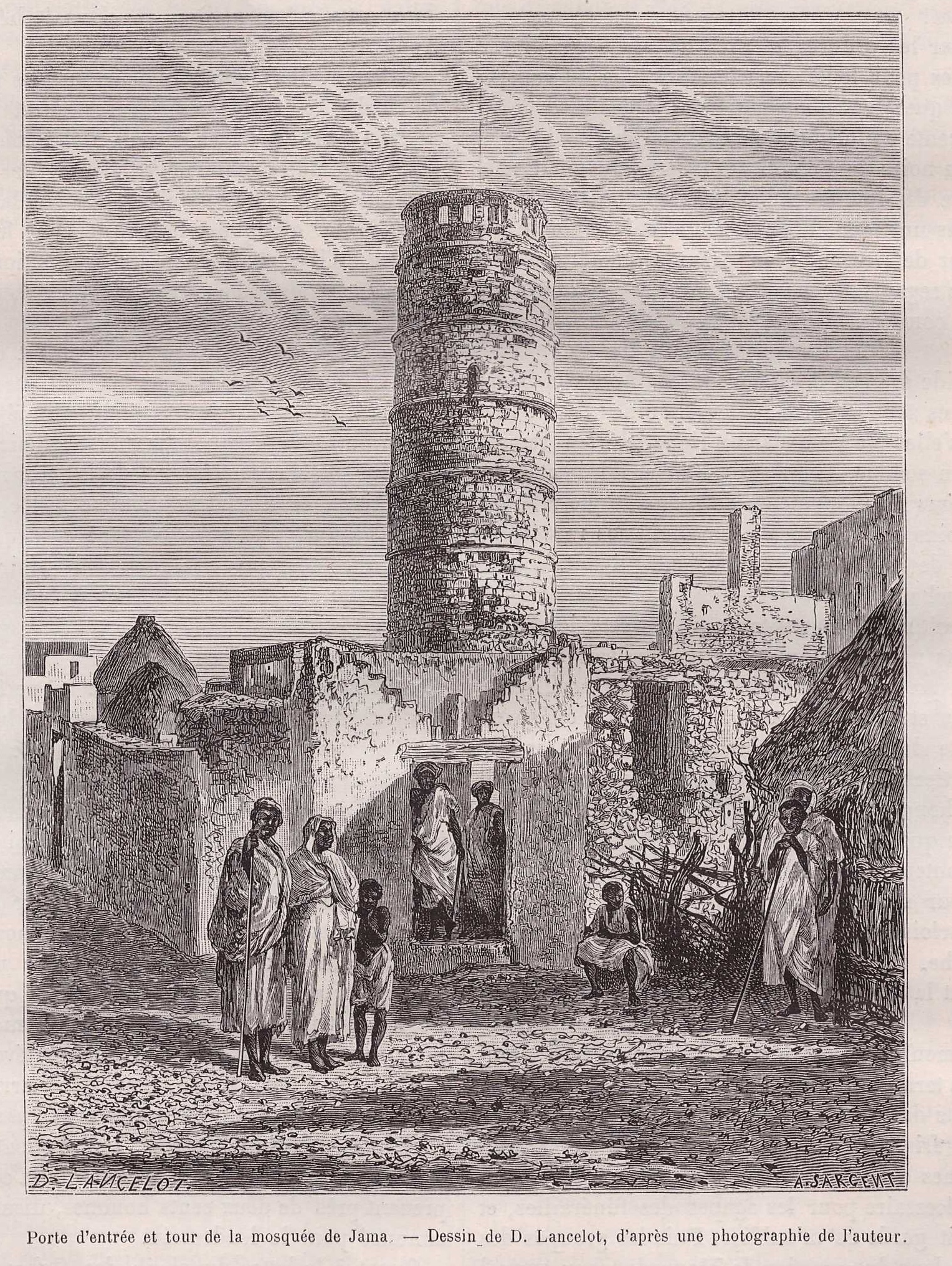
Mosque in Old Mogadishu.

From that time onwards, Abgaal nomads circled the town and sub-clans moved into the traditional quarters of the Hamarweyne district in the city.

Toward the end of the seventeenth century, an imam of Abgaal descent took up residence in the Shangaani quarter of Muqdisho. Members of the imam's lineage, which was known as Yaaquub, intermarried with the BaFadel and Abdi Semed, famed merchant families of Yemeni origin, and soon became renowed[sic] as abbaans in the trade between the coast and the interior.

The Yaqub sub-clan quickly established control of the town, and became the leaders from that time on, paving the way for the full take-over later on.

By 1700s, the Yaqub lineage of this Abgaal had seized control of Shangani, the northernmost sector of the city and established themselves as effective rulers of most of the town. The townspeople abandoned several outlying districts and those who remained found themselves in the other principle quarter, Hamarwayn, and living under pastoral domination.

=== Overthrow of the Ajuran Sultanate ===
The Ajuran rulers, in the end, became extremely prideful, neglected the sharia law, and imposed a heavy tax on their subjects which was the main reason for the rebellion. So, the Abgaal decided to overthrow them.

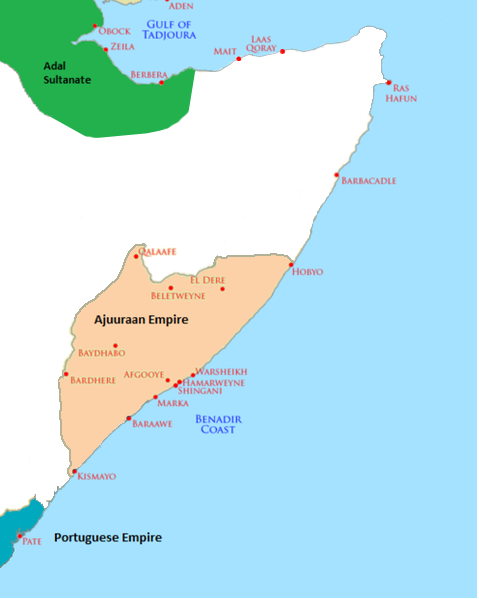
Ajuuraan & Adal map

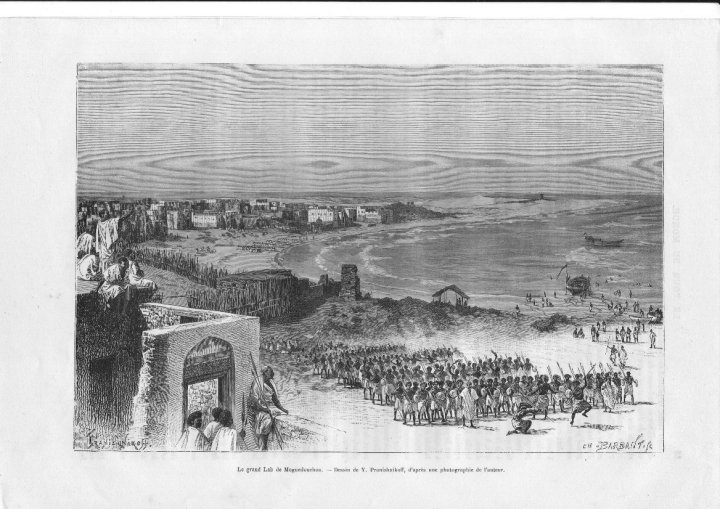
Annual Shirka festival, old Mogadishu.

Later the Mudaffar had an interpreter who was called ‘Ismankäy Haggi ‘Ali. A message was sent to the imam Mahmud ‘Umar, who lived at Golol. The imam, guiding his warriors, came south and approached Mogadiscio. Then what did ‘Ismankäy do? He spoke with the Mudaffar: ‘By now the Darandollä are near Mogadiscio, let me be accompanied by some soldiers, and I shall go to them.’ ‘How do you want to do it?’ ‘I shall do it this way. I shall come to an agreement with the leaders and make them return to the places in the north.’ ‘So be it!’ said the Mudaffar. Then ‘Ismänkäy took some soldiers with him, but without weapons: ‘Leave your weapons! We go out to conclude an agreement, not really for war.’ They put down the weaons. They went into the woodland. When they had gone into the woodland, the Darandollä came out and took all the soldiers prisoner. Then they continued the raid and entered Mogadiscio. The Mudaffar was captured and they wanted to kill him. But he, looking at the people who had come close to him, saw among them ‘Ismankäy Haggi Ali. ‘Stop!’ he said then. ‘Before you kill me, I want to speak. O ‘Ismankäy, you are good for nothing, you are capable of nothing, you will not pass seven!’ he said. Thus was ‘Ismankäy cursed. When the Mudaffar was killed, when seven days passed after his death, ‘Ismankäy died too. It happened exactly as he had been cursed.

‘After entering Muqdisho, the Darandoolle quarrelled with the Ajuraan. They quarrelled over watering rights. The Ajuraan had decreed: ‘At the wells in our territory, the people known as Darandoolle and the other Hiraab cannot water their herds by day, but only at night’’...Then all the Darandoolle gathered in one place. The leaders decided to make war on the Ajuraan. They found the imam of the Ajuraan seated on a rock near a well called Ceel Cawl. They killed him with a sword. As they struck him with the sword, they split his body together with the rock on which he was seated. He died immediately and the Ajuraan migrated out of the country.’

=== Hiraab Imaamate ===
After the Abgaal overthrew the Ajuran in Hamarweyne, other groups would follow in the rebellion which would eventually bring down Ajuran rule in the inter-riverine region and Benadir coast. They established the Hiraab Imamate which was the main successor state of the Ajuran Sultanate. Lee Cassanelli in his book, The Shaping of Somali society, provides a historical picture of the Hiraab Imamate. He writes:

"According to local oral tradition, the Hiraab imamate was a powerful alliance of closely related groups who shared a common lineage under the Gorgaarte clan divisions. It successfully revolted against the Ajuran Empire and established an independent rule for at least two centuries from the seventeen hundreds and onwards.

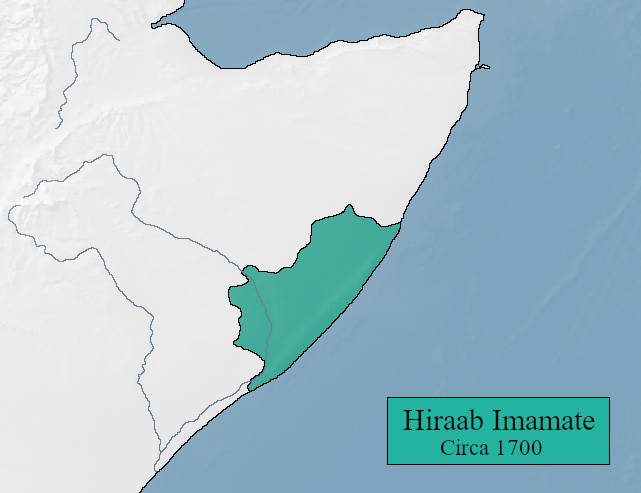
Map of the region controlled by the Hiraab Imamate in 1700.

By 1700, the Hiraab and other clans occupied a large territory stretching the interior from the Shabelle valley to the arid lands of Mudug and to the coastal areas of Mogadishu towards Hobyo. After the immediate fall of the Ajuuraan, the Hiraab established an independent rule for at least two centuries.

The alliance involved the army leaders and advisors of the Habar Gidir and Duduble, a Fiqhi/Qadi of Sheekhaal, and the Imam was reserved for the Mudulood branch who is believed to have been the first born. Once established, the Imamate ruled the territories from the Shabeelle valley, the Benaadir provinces, the Mareeg areas all the way to the arid lands of Mudug, whilst the ancient port of Hobyo emerged as the commercial border and Mogadishu being its capital for the newly established Hiraab Imamate in the late 17th century.

Hobyo served as a prosperous commercial centre for the Imamate. The agricultural centres of El Dher and Harardhere included the production of sorghum and beans, supplementing with herds of camels, cattle, goats and sheep. Livestock, hides and skin, whilst the aromatic woods and raisins were the primary exports as rice, other foodstuffs and clothes were imported. Merchants looking for exotic goods came to Hobyo to buy textiles, precious metals and pearls. The commercial goods harvested along the Shabelle river were brought to Hobyo for trade. Also, the increasing importance and rapid settlement of more southerly cities such as Mogadishu further boosted the prosperity of Hobyo, as more and more ships made their way down the Somali coast and stopped in Hobyo to trade and replenish their supplies.

== Role and influence in Somalia ==
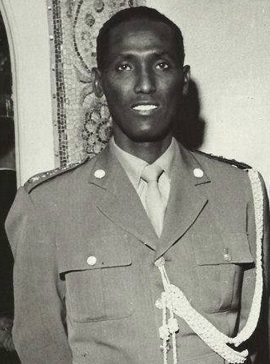
Father of the Somali military Daud Abdulle Hirsi

The Abgaal sub-clan has historically held a significant role in Somali affairs. This sub-clan has produced the most Somali Presidents, including Ali Mahdi Muhammad, Sharif Sheikh Ahmed, and the current president and twice-goer, Hassan Sheikh Mohamoud. These three individuals are among the four living former Presidents of Somalia. Notably, the Abgaal are the only Somali sub-clan to have had consecutive presidencies, with Sharif Sheikh Ahmed and Hassan Sheikh Mohamoud serving back-to-back terms. Additionally, Daud Abdulle Hirsi, who is regarded as the father of the Somali military, was also Abgaal.

Mogadishu, the capital, is also regarded as their territory. The current Governor/Mayor of Banadir, Yusuf Hussein Jimaale, belongs to the Abgaal clan, and they are the group traditionally holding this position, with all but 2 of the governors within the last 30 years being Abgaal. The Abgaal clan exerts comprehensive control over Mogadishu, from holding mayorships in most districts to influencing the court system, airports, and key positions throughout the city, demonstrating their widespread influence across its entirety.

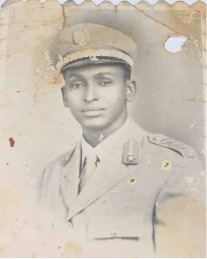
Salaad Gabayre, a Somali senior military official and a revolutionary.

Furthermore, the clan boasts influential figures in both the Somali business and media sectors, in addition to various other sectors. Notably, Abdirahman Yabarow], the editor-in-chief of VOA Somali, belongs to this clan.

== Rulers ==
In keeping with the tradition of Somali culture, the Abgaal have traditional, esteemed positions within their community. The Imaam, who also serves as the Imaam of Hiraab, originates from the Owbakar sub-clan, while the Ughaz hails from the Reer Ugaas sub-clan and is the Ugaas of Mudulood.

=== Imaam of Abgaal ===
	Ruler Name	Reign	Note
1	Imaam Ciqwaaq Maxamed Owbakar Gabane		Founder of the Hiraab Imamate and first Imam
2	Imaam Yacqub Imaam Ciqwaaq		Secondy Imam, eponymous ancestor of the Yacquubi dynasty
3	Imaam Xasan Imaam Yacquub		
4	Imaam Diimaale Imaam Xasan		
5	Imaam Hilowle I Imaam Diimaale		
6	Imaam Cumar Imaam Hilowle	1600- 1646	The first imam of Mogadishu from the Yaqubi dynasty in 1624
7	Imaam Maxamud Imaam Cumar	1646- 1685	
8	Imaam Axmed Imaam Maxamud	1685- 1702	
9	Imaam Maxamed Imaam Axmed	1702- 1744	
10	Imaam Cabdiraxman Maxamud	1750- 1778	His descendants would form a cadet Imamate based in Adale
11	Imaam Caamir I Imaam Cabdiraxman	1778- 1814	
12	Imaam Hilowle Suldan Maxamed	1814- 1870	Grandson of Imaam Caamir I
13	Imaam Caamir Suldan Maxamed	1870- 1928	Grandson of Imaam Hilowle
14	Imaam Cumar II Suldan Cali	1928-1986	Grandson of Imaam Caamir
15	Imaam Maxamuud II Imaam Cumar	1986-2011	Son of Imaam Cumar, chaired the peacemaking efforts between rival Hawiye factions in the Somali civil war
16	Imaam MaxamedIslow Yuusuf Cali	2011- 2021	Cousin of Imaam Maxamuud Imaam Cumar and nephew of Imaam Cumar Cali
17	Imaam Daahir Imam Maxamud	2021-present	Son of Imaam Maxamud, he is the current Imaam of Hiraab

== Clan tree ==
The Abgaal clans is divided into three main branches, the eldest Harti, the middle Wacbudhan and the youngest Waceysle.

Ali Jimale Ahmed outlines the Hawiye clan genealogical tree in The Invention of Somalia:

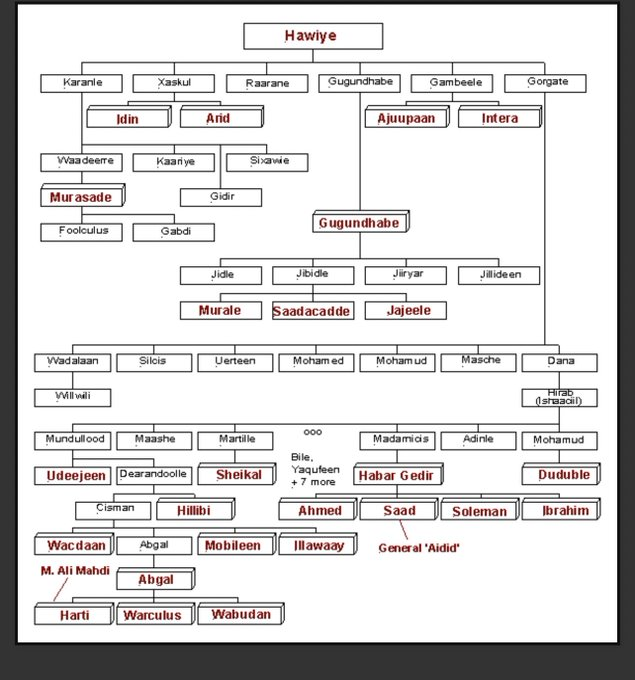
Hawiye clan tree

- Samaale
  - Irir
    - Hawiye, (Sheikh Ahmed)
      - Mohamud Gorgaarte
        - Hiraab
          - Mudulood
            - Abgaal (Cali)
              - Harti (Maxamed, Bah Sarjeele (Ajuuraan)
                - Warsangeli
                  - Omar
                  - Abdalle
                - Suul Harti
                  - Arone Muuse
                    - Abdalle Arone
                    - Nugaale (Habar Nugaal)
                    - Mohamed Arone
                      - Gabane Mohamed
                        - Agonyar
                        - Owbakar
                          - Reer Imaam
                      - Yabar Mohamed
                    - Saleban Arone
                - Isse Harti
              - Wacbudhan (Bah Hintire Bal'ad (Ajuuraan)
                - Danweyne
                  - Galmah Yonis
                    - Omar Galmah
                      - Mataan (Abdulle)
                    - Yusuf Galmah
                      - Mohamed Muuse
                      - Wehliye (Tuurcade)
                    - Abdulle Galmah
                  - Xuseen Yonis
                    - Sahal Koraaye
                    - Gardhaale
                  - Adan Yonis
                  - Ibrahim Yonis
                  - Mohamud Yonis
                  - Gaafow Yonis
                - Da'oud (Doole)
                  - Isaaq Da'oud
                  - Yusuf Da'oud
                    - Reer Ugaas
                - Kabaale (Muuse)
                  - Saleeban Muuse
                  - Hayle Muuse
                - Harti-Case (Rati-caso)
              - Waceysle (Warculus, Bah Hintire Bal'ad (Ajuuraan)
                - Jibraaiil Waceysle
                - Harun Waceysle
                - Saleban Waceysle
                  - Omar Saleban
                  - Dhagaweyne Omar
                - Abdalle Omar
                  - Gardhale
                    - Ali Gaaf
                  - Mohamud Abdalle
                    - Absuge
                    - Ma'alin Dhiblaawe
                  - Abdirahman Saleban
              - Abdulle Abgaal (Jurtub, Bah Sarjeele (Ajuuraan)
              - Mohamud Abgaal (Atwaaq, Bah Sarjeele (Ajuuraan)

== Prominent Abgaal members ==
=== Rulers and Nobility ===
- Dirre Sheikh Hussein (saint), 13th Century Muslim Saint of East Africa and Ruler of the Sultanate of Bale
- Malaakh Hassan Geedi Abtow, Traditional leader of Mogadishu
- Laashin Ahmed Gabyow, Somali Patriot and Fighter Poet of the Benadir Coast
- Laashin abwaan Jimcaale dhegataag.

=== Politics ===
- Sharif Sheikh Ahmed, Former President of Somalia
- Hassan Sheikh Mohamud, Current President of Somalia
- Ali Mahdi Muhammad, President of Somalia from 1991– 1997
- Hussein Kulmiye Afrah, vice-president of Somalia under the Siad Barre Regime
- Mohamud Mohamed Haji Baraako- Founder of the Liberal Party.
- Dahir Mohamud Gele - Minister of Information
- Thabit Cabdi Mohamed - Governor of Banaadir Region
- Sayid Omar Haji mohamed afrah garuun- Governor of Banaadir Region
- Osman Haji mohamed afrah garuun- Former politician and Member of Parliament.
- Omar Finnish, former mayor of Mogadishu and Governor of Banaadir
- Nur Hassan Husein, Former Prime Minister of the Transitional Federal Government
- Ali Ghedi, Former Prime Minister of the Transitional Federal Government
- Hassan Mohamed Hussein Mungab, Mayor of Mogadishu, Chief of the Somali Supreme Court, 2012–2016
- Abdirahman Omar Osman, was the governor of Banaadir and Mayor of Mogadishu.
- Salad Ali Jelle, Deputy Minister of Defense of the Transitional Federal Government
- Adde Gabow (Mohamed Ali Hassan), Politician, Governor and Mayor of Mogadishu
- Mohamed Ameriko, Somali Ambassador to Kenya
- Abdulahi Afrah, Minister of Commerce
- Abukar Umar Adani, Islamist, Tycoon, Owner of the El-Ma`an Port which served as Mogadishu's temporary Port since its closure in 1995
- Musa Sudi Yalahow, former Trade Minister in the Transitional Federal Parliament of Somalia
- Ali Dhere, Cleric and the Head of the first Islamic Court in northern Mogadishu

=== Generals. ===
- Brigadier General Daud Abdulle Hirsi, First Commander-In-Chief of the Somali National Army Forces
- Salaad Gabeyre Kediye, Brigadier General in the Somali Military, and chairman of the Somali Revolution.
- Brigadier General Mohamud Sheikh Ali, Chief of Airforce, and Former Head of Aviation
- Brigadier General Abdule Bare qalaye- Commander of the Somali National Army Training Command.
- Brigadier General Abukar Gacal Mudeey
- Brigadier General Hussein Kulmiye Afrah
- Brigadier General Abukar (Sulaley)
- Brigadier General Mohamud Mohamed Guleed- Commander of the Somali Air Force.

=== Leading intellectual. ===
- Hussein Sheikh Ahmed Kaddare, Orthographer and the Inventor of the Kaddariya Script
- Ismail Jim'ale Osoble, Human Rights Lawyer, Journalist, Cabinet Minister, Author of the 1990 Somali Manifesto
- Farah Weheliye Addow (Sindiko), Former Vice President of the Confederation of African Football
- Abdi Mohamed Ulusso, PhD Holder, Intellectual and 2004 Somali Presidential Candidate
- Hilowle Omar, Chairman of the (Somali Reconciliation and Reconstruction Council) (SRRC)
- Hilowle Imam Omar, Chairman of the Somali Civil War Reconciliation Program
- Cawil Dahir Salad was a prominent Somali journalist, writer, television presenter, and media personality.
- Farah Gololeey, Poet, Political Bard
- Ayub Daud, Professional Footballer
- Omar Mohamed, Professional Footballer
- Abdirahman Yabarow, Editor-in-Chief of the VOA Somali Service
