= Hiraab Imamate =

Former Somali kingdom

Hiraab Imamate Saldanadda Hiraab (Somali) سلطنة الأهراب (Arabic)
- Late 17th century–7 January 1889
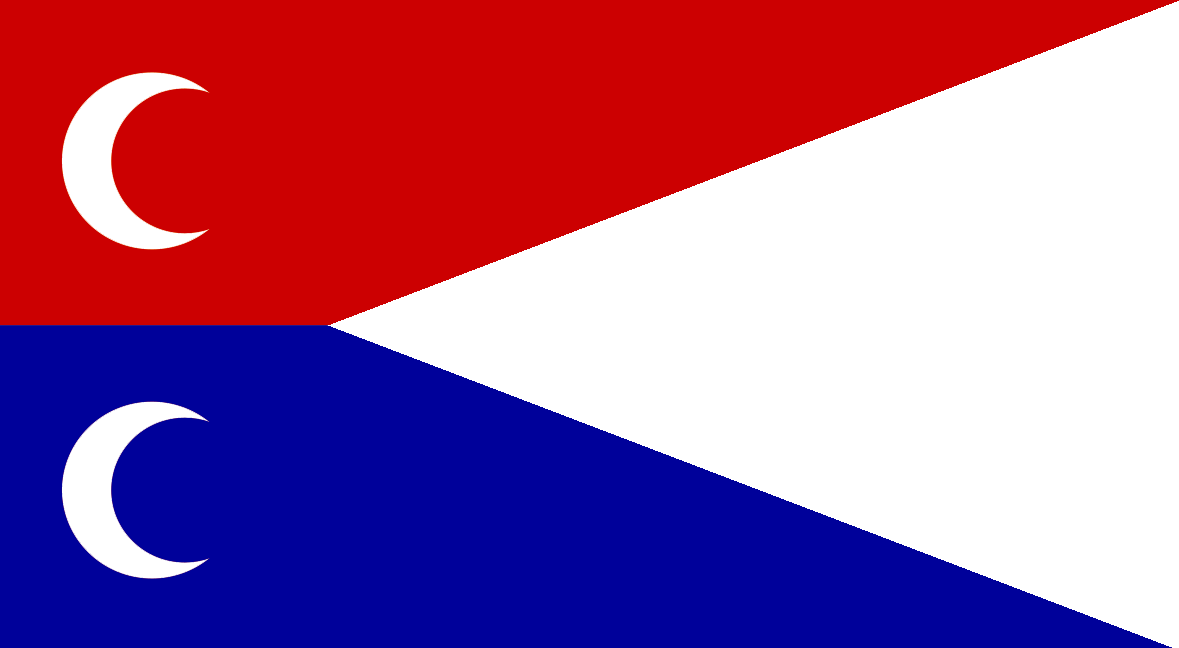
- Flag

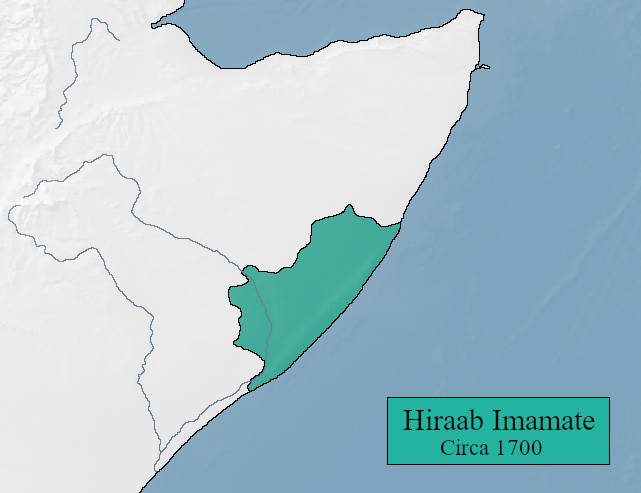
- Extent of the Hiraab Imamate after completely expelling the Ajuran Sultanate
- Status: Late 17th century-1889 Independent Imamate Protectorate of Italy (from 1889)
- Capital: Mogadishu
- Common languages: Somali; Arabic
- Religion: Sunni Islam (Sufi)
- Demonyms: Somali, Hiraab
- Government: Monarchy
- Imam Abdulkarim Ibn Ahmed
- History
  - Established: Late 17th century
  - Disestablished: 7 January 1889
Preceded by
Ajuran Sultanate
Succeeded by
Sultanate of Hobyo
Sultanate of the Geledi
Italian Somaliland
- Today part of: Somalia

The Hiraab Imamate (Somali: Saldanadda Hiraab), also known as the Yacquubi Dynasty, was a Somali kingdom that ruled parts of the Horn of Africa during the 16th century till the 19th century until it was incorporated into Italian Somaliland. The Imamate was governed by the Hiraab Yacquub Dynasty. It was founded by Imam Omar who successfully rebelled against and defeated the Ajuran Sultanate, later establishing an independent kingdom.

== History ==
=== Establishment ===
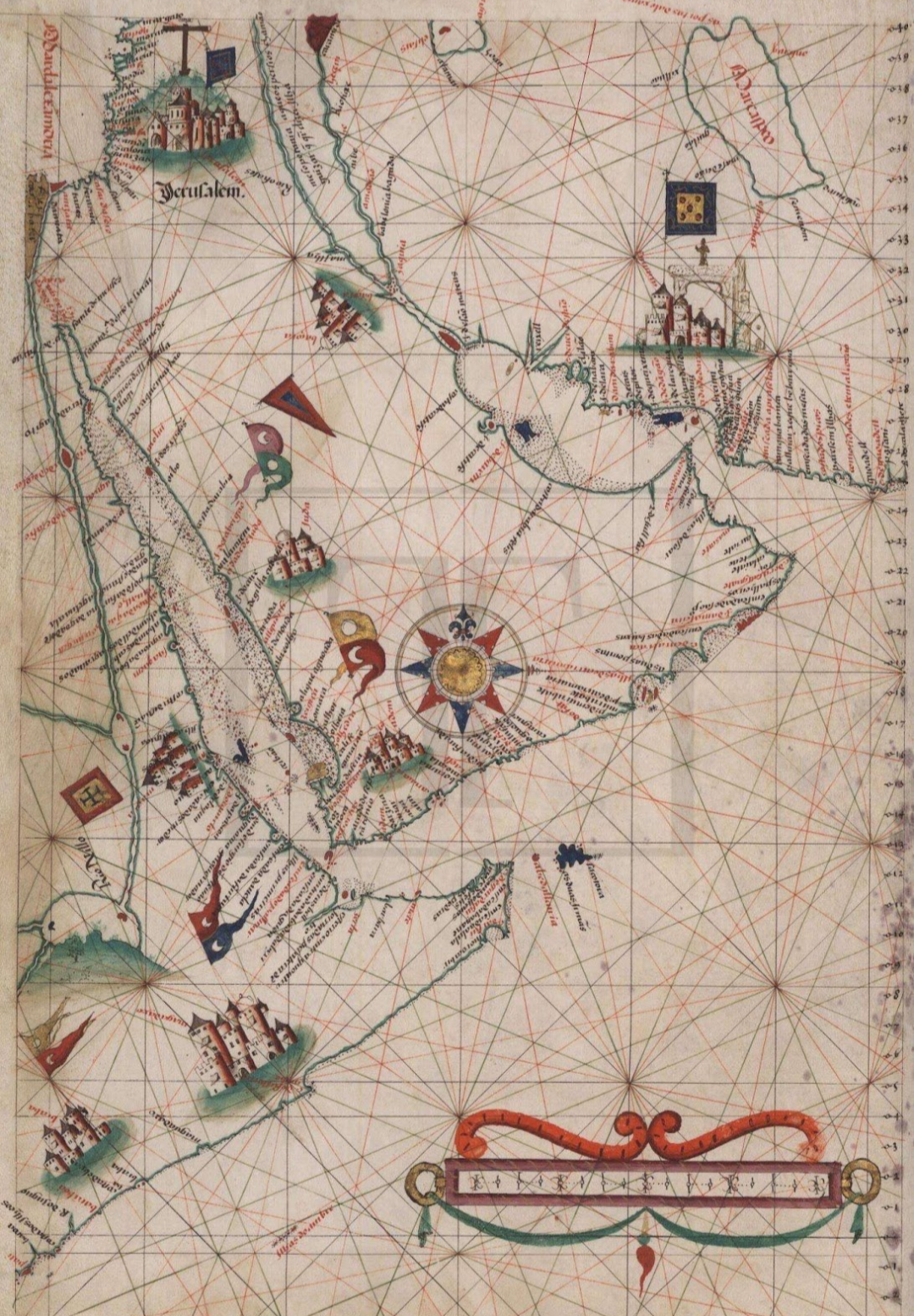
Late 17th Century Mogadishu

The Hiraab Imamate was the successor state of the Ajuran Sultanate. The reason for their rebellion was the Ajuran rulers, in the end, became extremely prideful, neglected the sharia and imposed a heavy taxation on their subjects which was the main reason for the rebellion.

The first clan to ever challenge the Ajuuraan rulers was the Darandoolle clan a section of Hiraab.

The Ajuuraan had decreed: “At the wells in our territory, the people known as Darandoolle and the other Hiraab cannot water their herds by day, but only at night.” … Then all the Darandoolle gathered in one place. The leaders decided to make war on the Ajuuraan. They found the imam of the Ajuuraan seated on a rock near a well called Ceel Cawl. They killed him with a sword. As they struck him with the sword, they split his body together with the rock on which he was seated. He died immediately and the Ajuuraan migrated out of the country. In another variation of the story, a young Darandoolle warrior was born with a gold ring on his finger, a sign of his future preeminence. The Darandoolle then rallied around their young leader, who eventually assumed the title of Imam of the Hiraab and took up residence in Muqdisho.

After the successful rebellion of the Darandoolle, other clans began to challenge the Ajuuraan hegemony. Along the upper and middle reaches of the Shabelle valley, the pastoral Gaaljecel, Baadicade and Xawaadle waged several unsuccessful campaigns before they eventually united to drive the Ajuuraan out of the area. The Habar Gidir and Duduble also drove the Ajuuraan out of Galgaduud and Mudug provinces after a hard-fought battle.

By 1700, the Hiraab and other clans occupied a large territory stretching the interior from the Shabelle valley to the arid lands of Mudug and to the coastal areas of Mogadishu towards Hobyo. After the immediate fall of the Ajuuraan, the Hiraab established an independent rule for at least two centuries.

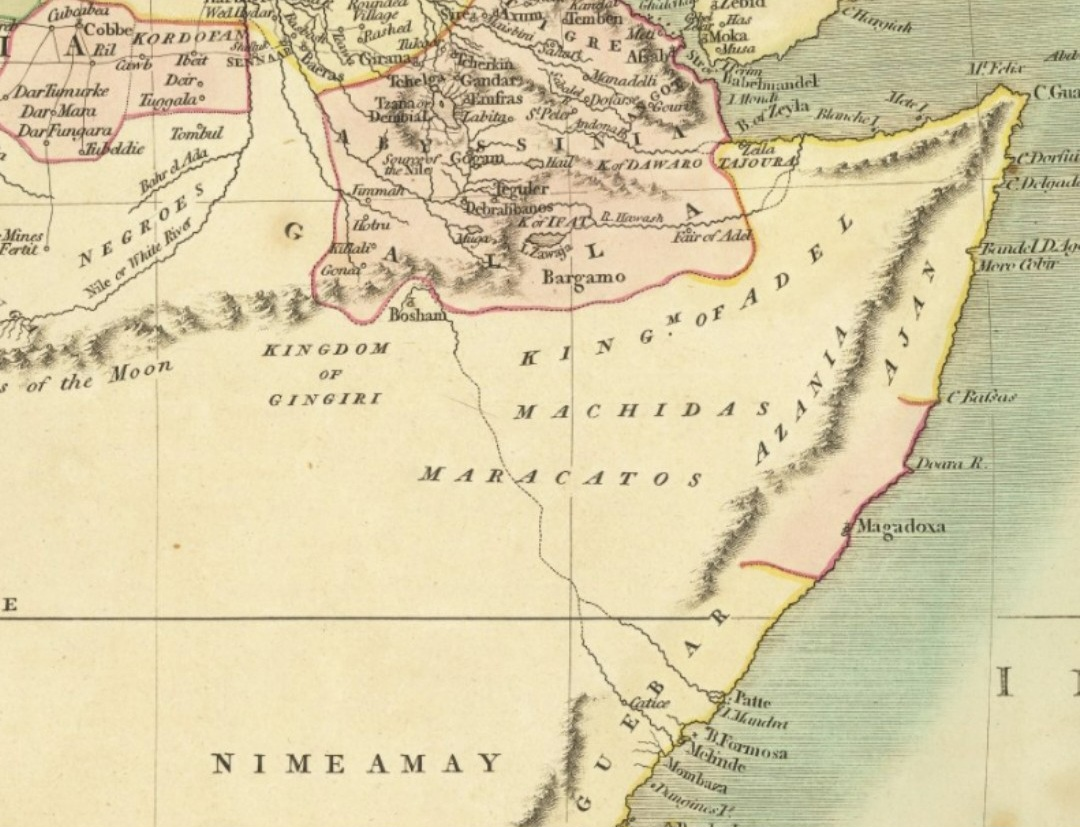
The reign of Hirab in the late 1700s

Called Regno di Magadozo or the Kingdom of Magadoxo in official medieval bulletins, at their peak the Yacquub Imams would go on to dominate what became Greater Benadir.

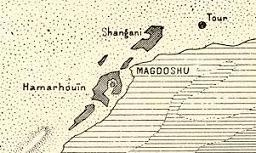
Map of Mogadishu in the 19th century, under the Hiraab imamate, deserting

"Magadoxa extends from Cape Bassas to the equator; its limits inland have not been ascertained. The prince having succeeded in maintaining his independence, and repelled all European intercourse, allows the country to be very little unknown."

=== European incursion ===
One of its first tests of strength was to defend Mogadishu in 1701 against a French Incursion of Mogadishu which saw seven ships dock at a nearby harbour and stay for 11 days. They had planned to take the city but they were successfully repulsed. The quarters of Hamarweyn and Shingani united in the face of this threat. This was reported by Sharif Aydurus in his 20th-century book the Bughyat Al-Amal Fi Tarikh Al-Sumal.

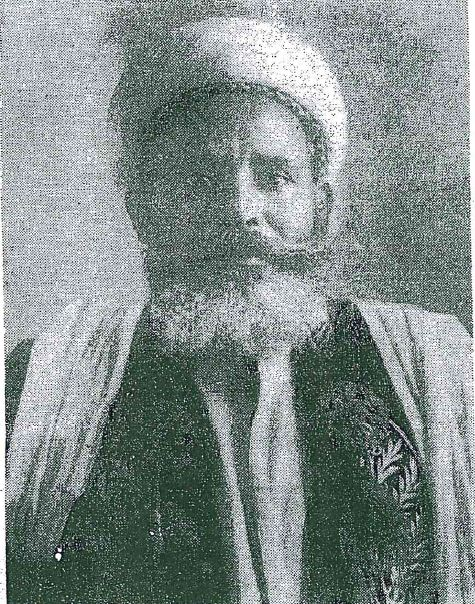
Sharif Aydurus, Somali historian and religious scholar, belonging to the Ashraf clan

According to the Encyclopedia of Geography, in the year 1707, the British Royal Naval Warship H.M.S. Albemarle sent an armed boat on shore, but it was detained and never recovered; and a party from Captain W. Owen's vessel were imprisoned. This would mark almost two centuries until the Imperial forces return to East Africa.

=== Decline and civil war ===
By 1870, the Imamate had declined internally which was the main reason for decentralization. In a detailed event recorded by Italy, after the death of the 9th Imam Mohamed Ahmed in 1843, the succession to become the next Imam caused a serious dispute and a near full-scale civil war. The Imam had left seven sons, which saw one of them, Ali Mohamed, usurp the remaining six and kill the senior Mahmud Mohamed in his house in the Hamaruein quarter of the city. They would eventually split the rulership with a coastal power headquartered in Adale from the first line of descent (Sultan Abikar or Abubaker) and an inland power based at the Mahaday river (Sultan Otoman) with the elder Imam family (Imam Mahmud) in Mogadishu both from the second line of descent.

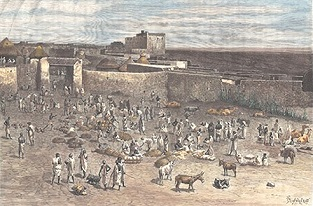
During the decline of the Hiraab, major cities, especially Mogadishu shrank in size this worsened with the Hiraab Civil War

"Ali Mohamed's sons, Sciaeb, Abdurahman, Mahmud and Mahadalle waged war against their cousins Abdurahman, Achmed, and Ali. Abdurahman and Mahmud remained dead and left behind three sons, Hamir, Ali, and Omar. Following these massacres, the Somali people seriously consulted for the appointment of the Imam. Two parties were in antagonism: those wanting as Imam the sons of Ali Mohamed, those for the sons of Mahmud Mohamed. The dispute was very fierce, so much so that for this election there was a great war between the tribes, where, it is said, about five hundred people were killed on both sides"

"It was finally entrusted to the Abgal tribe, called Omar Egalle, to propose peace, offering to settle the deal for the election of the Imam. In fact, they worked hard to quell the tumultuous parties, failing to quell them in part if not within the definitive division of the territory: assigning the stretch of the coast from Ras Elhur to the environs of Merka under the protection of the sons of Ali Mohamed, and starting from Uarsciek for the interior, under the protection of the sons of Mahmud Mohamed. These thus came to occupy a territory parallel to the former, but more inland"

The Imamate also began to face challenges from increasing European design, the Sultan of Zanzibar from the coast, the Geledi Sultanate and the Hobyo Sultanate from both directions.

=== Colonial era ===
Since the British-sponsored bombing of Mogadishu Port in 1828 by Oman for refusing protection, the Hiraab Imamate fought for decades to maintain a sphere of influence impending the arrival of European Powers and their regional allies in Zanzibar and Egypt.

In exchange for support over conflict in Kismayo, Barawa and Merca against Hiraab clans of the hinterland such as the Abgaal, Wacdaan and Sheekhaal, Sultan Barghash of Zanzibar, who had been greatly indebted to Britain, had requested the Sultanate of Geledi in the early 1870s to interpose his good offices and marriage ties with one of the factions of the Imamate for a trade garrison between them all, though initially rejected by the other Imamate faction but faced with a trade injunction in Afgoye and Bulo Marerto, acquiesed with setting up an office near the Old City while some of the tribute went to the Imamate such as Malaakh Hassan Geedi Abtow the Malaakh of Xamar and Xamar daye who surrounded the numerous roads into the city.

The decline of the Hiraab Imamate saw many clans begin to break off from the state and establish their own states, leading to its fragmentation and the most prominent one being the Hawadle ruling the Hiran region. The Hiraab Imamate, by the time of the Berlin Conference, was now a traditional polity that exclusively governed parts of the Hiraab clan territories, mainly the capital Mogadishu.

Soon after Britain set up a colony in Aden (South Yemen) in 1839, the Imamate's northern border areas of Hobyo were targeted in British and French ambitions to control the Somali coast closer to Aden and more directly rather than using the nominal offices of Zanzibar.

As one of the very first acts signifying the start of foreign Colonialism in Somalia in 1884 with British patronage, they used the chief of Alula in the Bari region, Yusuf Ali Kenadid, to their advantage who, at the time of the 1884 Berlin Conference earlier in the year, was in conflict with his cousin-ruler over Alula, so a case was made to set up a new base in Hobyo with the help of British Colonial Yemeni musketeer fighters enlisted to satisfy all the parties.

"With Britain's backing, Yusuf obtained Barghash's approval to create a new port near the mouth of the Wadi Nugaal. Under pressure from Britain, Barghash agreed to acquiesce in Yusuf's proposals to establish a rival Majeerteen state to the south of Cape Guardafui. Barghash, for his part, asserted that he would retain all the income and duties derived from his expanded coastline, stating that Yusuf was 'leasing' the coast to 'watch over' Zanzibari interests. In the few feverish weeks of international scheming in Aden with the British, French and Sultan Barghash, this had been predicated not out of a mutual interest but on power politics, aggression and British imperial control."

An early European traveller, Elisée Reclus at the Consulate in Zanzibar, describes the German political events of Hobyo - where the British first planned to govern North East Somalia from, until the German offices in Zanzibar entered negotiations at the time on the conflict-prone historical clan boundaries of the Hiraab Imamate and the Majerteen Sultanate - in several French, German and English scientific journals. The Germans similarly sought a treaty to govern Berbera to Hobyo.

Some treaty concludes with the sultan of Opia, an obscure princelet now put forward as the "chief of all of the Somali people", his very existence is unknown to the vast majority of the nation, as is theirs to him. This village, or rather camping-ground of Opia, which has thus been suddenly promoted to the dignity of capital, is situated on a headland between the territory of the Hawiyas and that of the Mijertin tribe. But even diplomatists will never be able to make it the center of any large population, for the surrounding country is a waterless steppe, while the neighbouring seaboard is absolutely destitute of harbours

=== Hiraab-Italy relations and Sultan Abiker ===
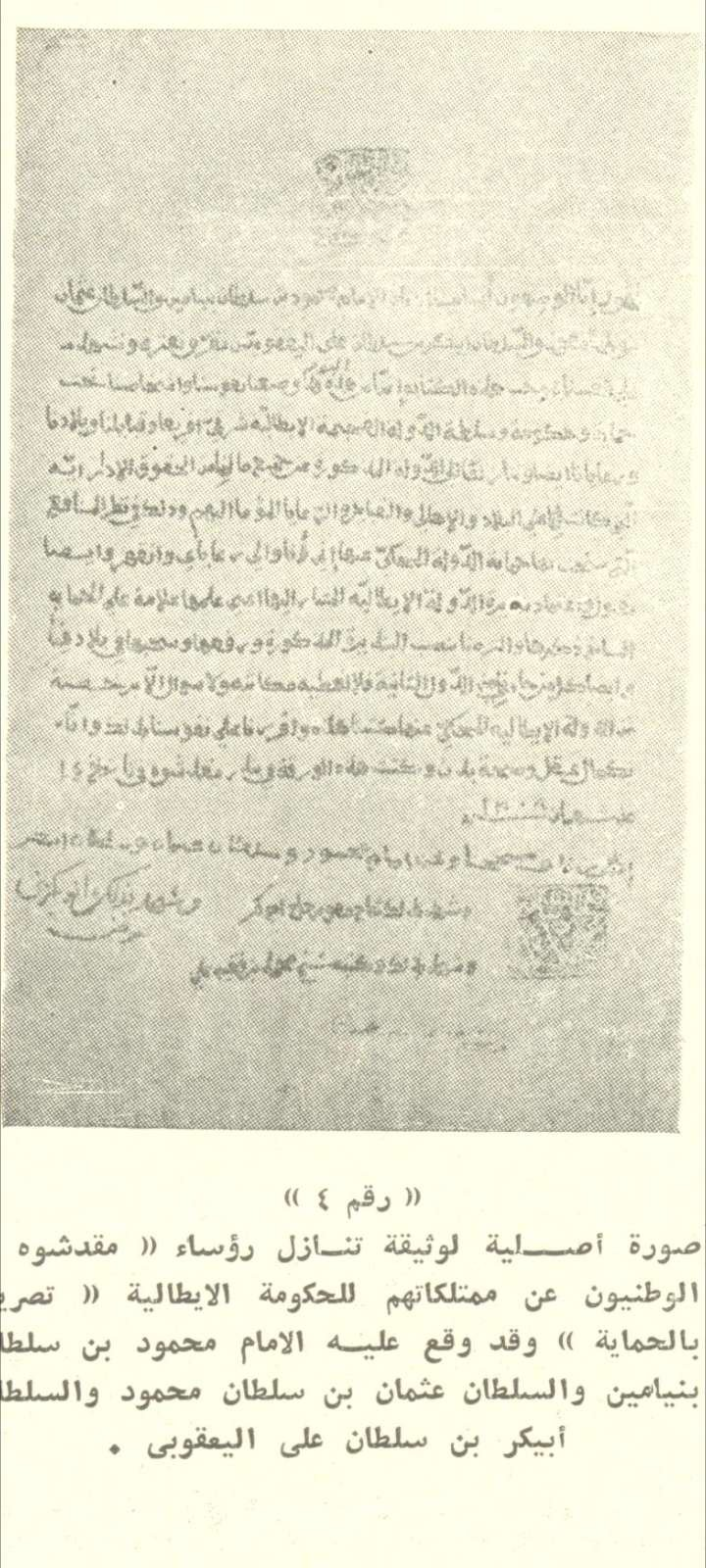
Agreement between the rulers of the Hiraab Yacquubi dynasty accepting to become a protectorate of the Kingdom of Italy in 1891

The Horn of Africa had been partitioned following the Berlin Conference in 1884, and after up to five years of local Hiraab clans blockading Merca to Ras Elhur and Hobyo in repelling the European influence, the Italians in observation of other powers had made several attempts to trail warships along the coast of Banadir, in early 1889 lifting the sieges through negotiations to re-open trade, lobbying voting bids against other European powers and by the dedicated offices of the Italian Consul General in Zanzibar and Fervent Imperial Explorer of East Africa, Antonio Cecchi who was later killed in Lafole in 1896 after seeking potential allies amongst the 1889-Italian possessions retitled the "Afgoi territory", "Obbia territory" and "Migiurtinia region" against the Ethiopian Empire fighting in Adwa before some of the local chiefs were later pensioned off in 1908 and 1925–1927, respectively. Though some of the several chiefs of those regions or territories had long conspired or requested Italian protection several months or years earlier, Sultan Abiker Ali Jacub, representing the Imamate's coastal faction and descendants of Imam Ali Mohamed, ruled the lands from Jazeera to Ceel Huur with his capital in Cadale. Sultan Abiker signed the first Somali-Italian treaty of friendship and commerce on 7 January 1889. Attempting to achieve a favourable recognition with the new Colonial Power under its first Governor Captain Vincenzo Filonardi, Italy endeavored to make Cadale the first Capital of its Colony.

While Sultan Abiker was returning to Cadale he was killed shortly thereafter by his own clan, for what was deemed betrayal. He was replaced politically by Sheikh Daud Abgaal of the principality of Mareeg.

Questi riferiva che Abubaker, Sultano di Itala e a buon amico dell'Italia, era stato ucciso a tradimento ai primi di marzo da alcuni somali della sua stessa tribù (Abgal) a poche ore di distanza dalla stazione di Itala.

"He reported that Abubaker, Sultan of Itala and a good friend of Italy, had been killed treasonously in early March by some Somalis of his own tribe (Abgal) a few hours away from the Itala station"

=== Massacre of Warsheikh ===
After the collapse of the Hiraab imamate when the Colonialists began to gain influence, Warsheikh was ruled by a local Abgaal chief. On April 24 1890 An Italian steamboat was ordered to be equipped and sent to the shores of Warsheikh under the command of Lieutenant Zavagli, with instructions to "seek a meeting with the local chief of the area, whose population primarily belonged to the Abgaal subclan of the Hawiya Somalis, to demonstrate the crew’s friendly intentions and to offer gifts for the chiefs and the population." Alongside Zavagli were Coxswain Angelo Bertolucci, Seaman 3rd Class Angelo Bertorello, Engineer 3rd Class Alfredo Simoni, Stoker 2nd Class Giuseppe Gorini, Chief Helmsman 2nd Giovanni Gonnella, and an Arab interpreter Said Achmed.

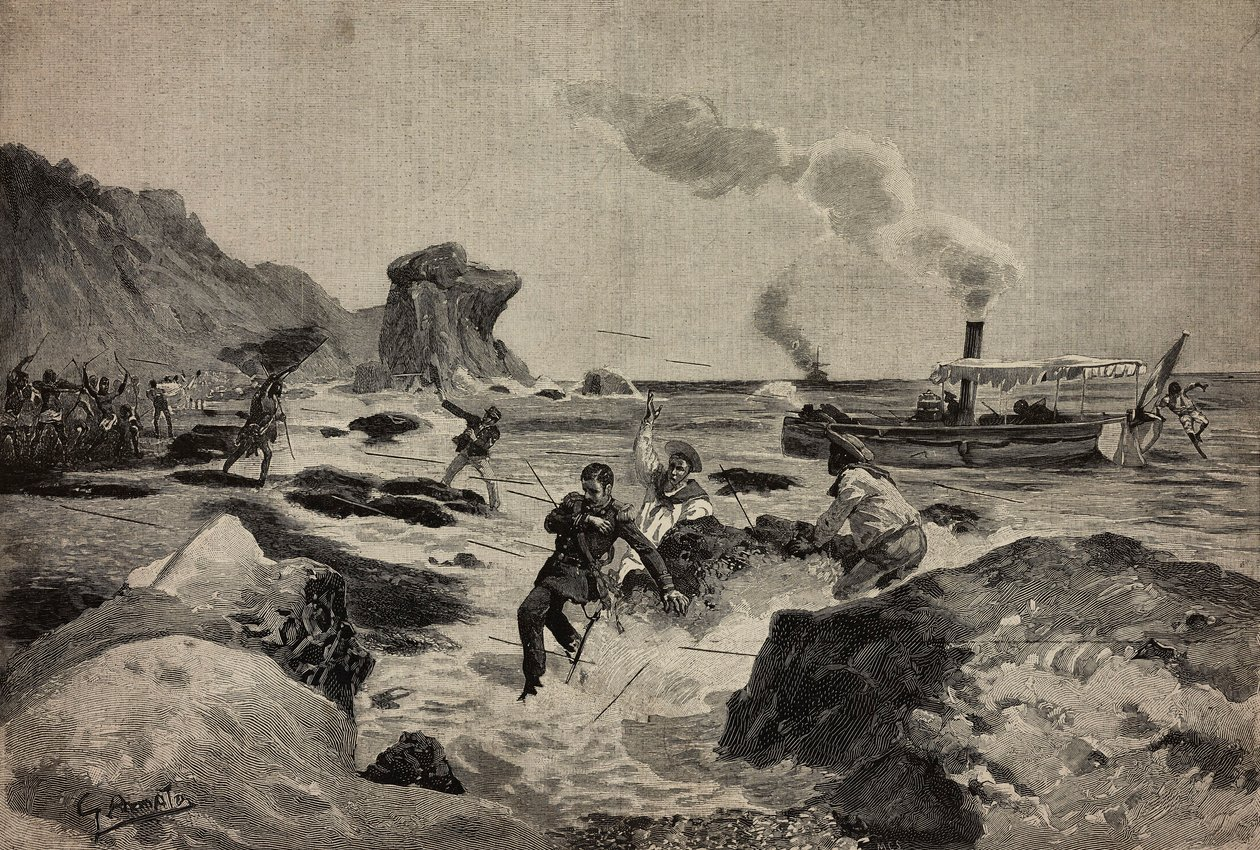
Somali attack on Italian ships at Warsheikh

What happened after, from Minister Brin's report to the King, it was a veritable ambush, launched at a signal from the village Somali chief, against the three Italians who had disembarked. Zavagli was immediately wounded and died on the boat, which was hastily trying to get out to sea while the rest of the crew fired wildly to cover their escape. Bertorello was hit by the Somalis while working on the anchor; he suffered wounds, which caused him to die shortly after, he jumped into the water to free the propeller from its mooring where it had become entangled due to the disaster.

Upon return, their boat was studded in arrows, and Lieutenant Zavagli's body in a pool of blood, his head decapitated.

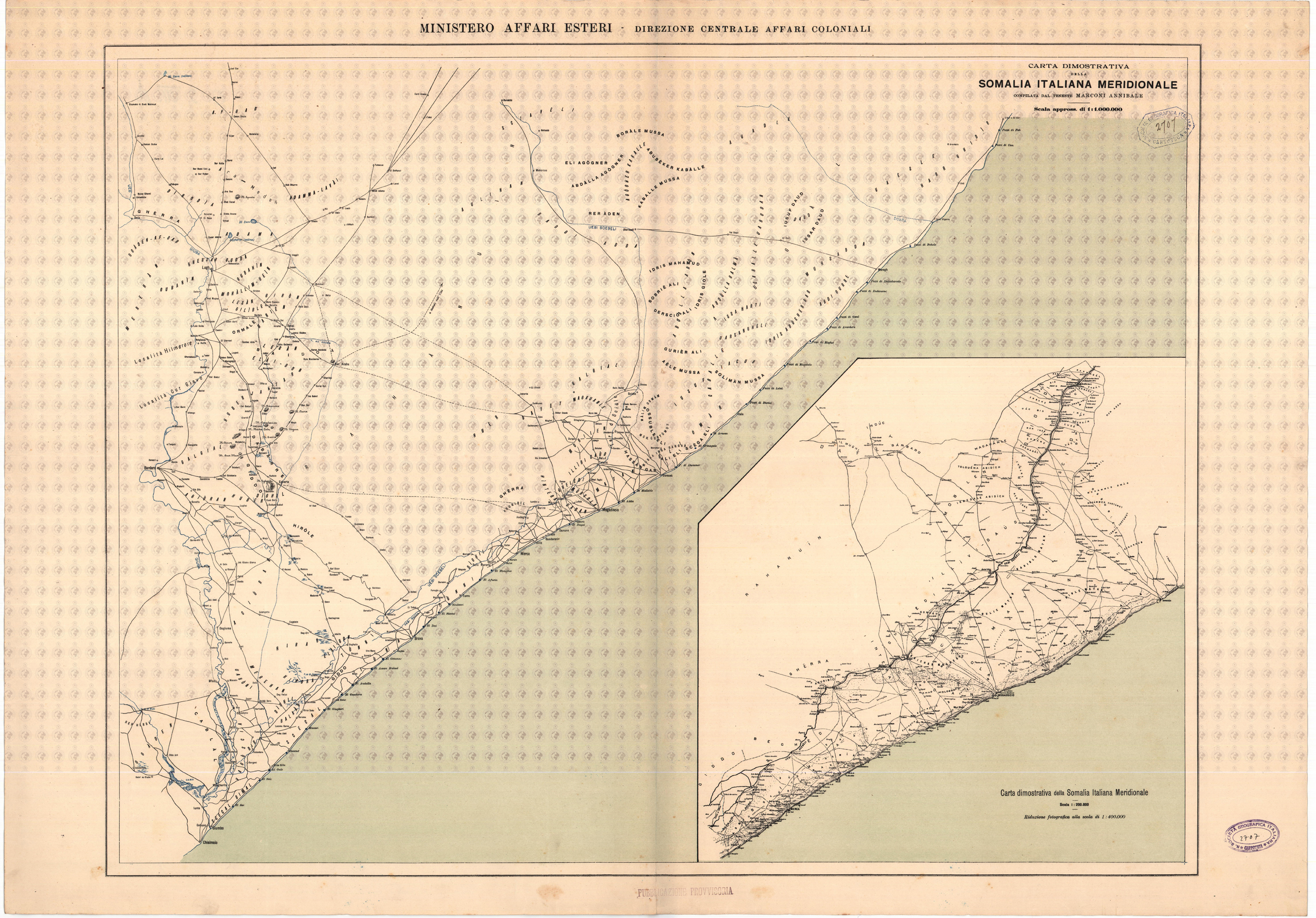
Italian Colony of Benadir (1921)

With the Captain's Italian military warships shortly on their way south to Mogadishu in the same year following the death of the Cadale ruler, the Volturno crewships had faced numerous conflicts in Cadale and Warsheikh, before Imam Mahmud Imam Binyamin from the rival Imamate faction in Mogadishu signed the Benadir Protectorate treaty, where Italy acquired concessions of all the Imamate's inland areas of the Hawiye, with Italy now administering both factions under a 'Greater Benadir' (later called Southern Italian Somaliland in 1910) to serve as a frontier against Ethiopian ambitions in the far North, the Ogaden and against Britain ambitions in the North West and Jubaland.

Robert L. Hess summarises the advent of Imperialism published in the Journal of African History.

At the end of the nineteenth century the Horn of Africa had been partitioned among Ethiopia, Great Britain, and Italy. The evacuation of the Egyptian garrison at Harrar and the military prowess of Ras Makonnen had permitted Menelik to extend his new Ethiopian empire eastwards into the Ogaden region inhabited by various Somali tribes. In 1884, the British had extended a protectorate over northwestern Somalia for the strategic defense of Aden and the Bab El Mandeb entrance to the Red Sea. In 1893, after years of difficult negotiations, an Italian chartered company had assumed its concessions of the Benadir coast of Southern Somalia, and an Italian protectorate had in anticipation been proclaimed over the rest of southern Somalia in 1889. In that year of apparent but ephemeral diplomatic success, when Italy assumed that Ethiopia, too, was its protectorate, northeastern Somalia came under influence. In 1908, it united the northern protectorate (Obbia, Mejertain) and Benadir to form an Italian Somalia Governorate. Since 1889 however, there has been a rivalry in the north and south between Ethiopia and Italy over the allegiance of the Somalis.

Upon receiving further treaties and concessions from inland subclans at a time, Italy attempted to administer the traditionally remote and inaccessible hinterlands of Greater Benadir from Elhur on the Mudug coastline to Giumbo in the Lower Jubba. This often led to border disputes over pasture, water wells and renewals of conflict. Regular attempts were made by the Colonial Administrator to draw up contractual agreements between the clans.

Tra le popolazioni che , per la loro normale dislocazione verso i limiti interni del retroterra del Benadir e dei Sultanati, erano da considerarsi « genti di confine », andavano annoverate, oltre quelle già dette : - le tribù degli Herab, insediate nella zona a cavallo.

"Among the populations that, due to their normal location towards the boundaries of the hinterland of Benadir and the Sultanates, were to be considered "border peoples", in addition to those already mentioned: - the Herab tribes, settled in the area on Horseback"

"The Obbian was not to initiate an offensive against the Mullah without the consent of the Resident, whom he recognised as the representative of the Italian government in all matters. Obbian expansion in the direction of Meregh was halted and all armed military movements had to be approved by the Italian Resident."

After the Fascist takeover in the 1920s, the region was snapped up by the Italians under Italian Somaliland and this eventually led to the birth of a Modern Somalia. However, the Hiraab hereditary leadership has remained intact up to this day and enjoys a dominant influence in national Somali affairs.

== Administration ==
The Ajuuraan predecessors had styled their leadership as an Imamate which was subsequently inherited by the Yacquubi family.

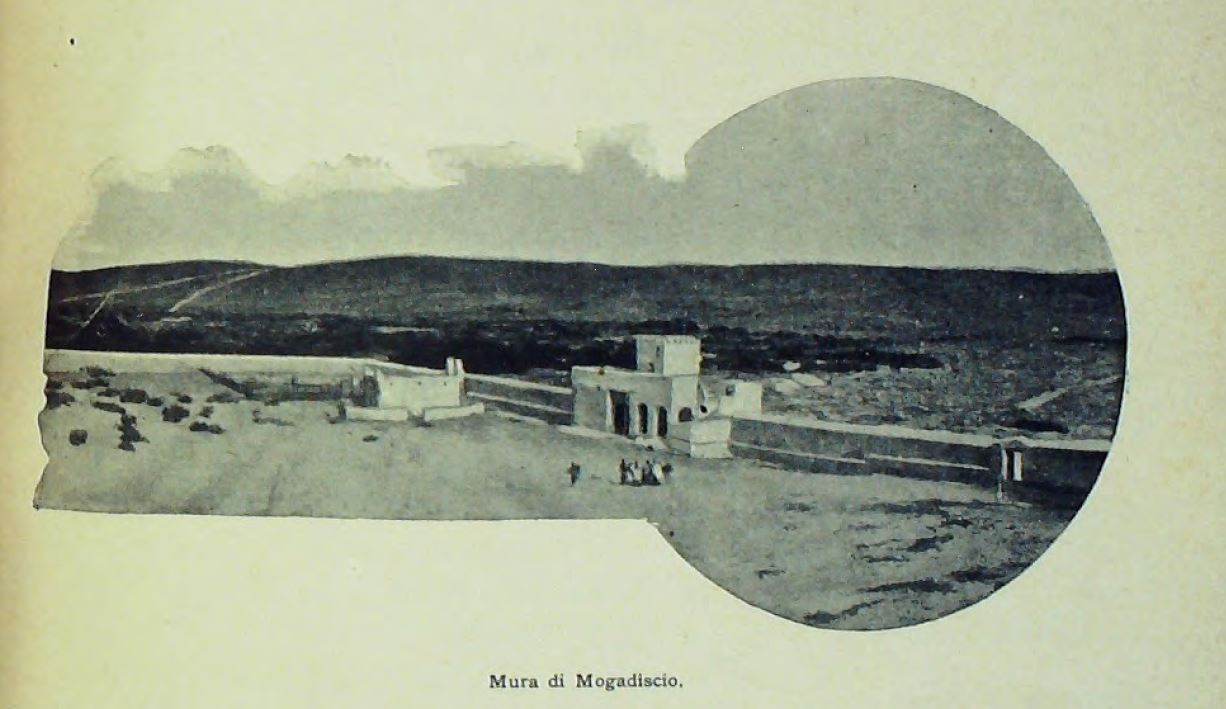
The walls of Mogadishu, before it being demolished by the Italians. The picture reads Mura di Mogadiscio, which translates to Walls of Mogadishu.

The Hiraab Imamate exerted a centralized authority during its existence and possessed some of the organs and trappings of a traditional integrated state: a functioning bureaucracy, a state flag, regular correspondence with neighbouring civilizations in written Arabic, taxation in the form of livestock and cash crops including a third of the Mogadishu emporium port's revenue as well as a professional army.

According to local oral tradition, the Hiraab imamate administration involved a powerful alliance of closely related groups who shared a common lineage under the Hiraab clan division of the Gorgaarte Hawiye. The alliance involved the army leaders and advisors of the Habar Gidir, Duduble and Udejeen, the religious roles were reserved by Sheekhaal, and the Imam was reserved for the Abgaal clan who is believed to have been the firstborn. The Imamate was not only confined to Hiraab but incorporated other Somalis such as Hawadle, Gaalje'el, Murusade, Silcis, Surre and Banaadiri. Once established, the Imamate ruled the territories stretching from Mogadishu in the Banaadir province to the Shabelle valley, to Galguduud province all the way to the arid lands of Mudug, which included the ancient port of Hobyo.

The Hiraab Imamate's main capital was at Mogadishu and the House of Yacquub was the ruling hereditary dynasty of the Hiraab Imamate. The Imam would receive dignitaries in Mogadishu, correspond with leaders such as the Sultan of Zanzibar or foreign explorers and assign them patrons when they visited his territory to assist them in their business and trade.

Luigi Robecchi Bricchetti an early Italian explorer who recorded traditions of the Imamate, had made the following observation;

It is a traditional custom among the Somalis, that the assumption of the title of Ugaz and Imam is always celebrated with an important ceremony attended by all the tribes with which they agree to convene. Great assemblies (scir) and fantasies take place to dance, eat, improvise songs, horse races and the party goes on for a month. In short, it is a real feast for which even when two tribes were at war, if a Somali assumes the title of Ugaz or Imam - the hostilities pursued - gain temporary peace. And it is in the solemnity of these assemblies that the head adorns themself with a special turban, made with filaments peeled from a tree which the Somalis call Ghed-hadd.

== Economy ==
Charles Guillain's caravan expedition in 1848, departing from Mogadishu.

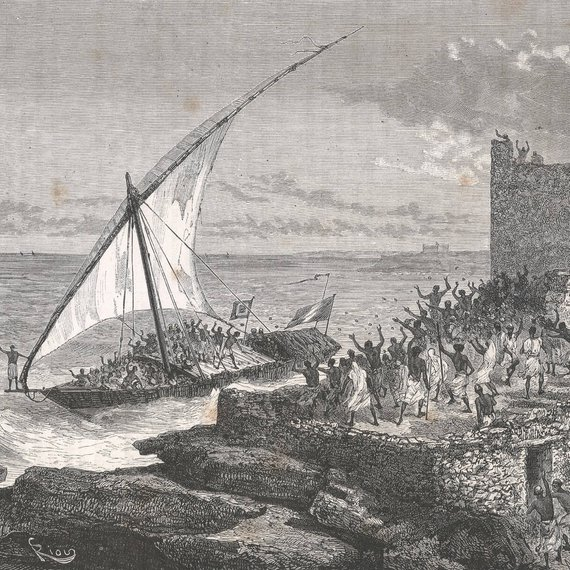
Somali sailors in Mogadishu in 1860 flying Hiraab flags.

Hobyo served as a prosperous commercial center for the Imamate. The agricultural centers of El Dhere and Harardhere included the production of sorghum, maize and beans supplemented with herds of camels, cattle, goats, and sheep. Livestock, skin hides, aromatic woods and raisins were the primary exports while rice, other foodstuffs, and clothes were imported. Merchants looking for exotic goods came to the Imamate ports to buy textiles, precious metals and pearls. Harvesting along the Shabelle river where major agricultural centers were located like Beledweyne and Jowhar, a large number of fruits and vegetables were produced and brought to Mogadishu and Warsheikh for trade. Also, the increasing importance and rapid settlement of more southerly cities such as Mogadishu further boosted prosperity, as more and more ships made their way down the Somali coast to trade and replenish their supplies.

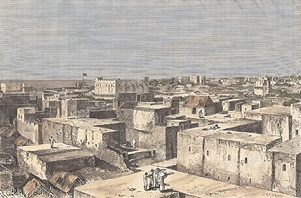
Illustration of Mogadishu in the 19th century

The economy of the Hiraab in the interior includes nomadic pastoralism, cultivation within agricultural settlements of the Shebelle valley and fertile plains of central Somalia, as well as mercantile commerce along the urban coast. The Hiraab ports would export various commodities through its maritime routes including cattle skin, slaves, ivory, textiles, iron, gold, silva, pearls, ambergris, incense and numerous other exotic goods.

Explorer John Kirk arrived in southern Somalia in 1873 during a period of great economic prosperity with the region being dominated by the Imamate and the Geledi Sultanate. Kirk met Imam Mahmood who reigned over Mogadishu. Trade between the Hiraab of Mogadishu and the Geledi Sultanate led by Ahmed Yusuf was flourishing. Kirk noted a variety of other things. Roughly 20 large dhows were docked in both Mogadishu and Merka respectively filled with grain produced from the farms of the Geledi in the interior with much of the trade being destined for Zanzibar.

== Military ==
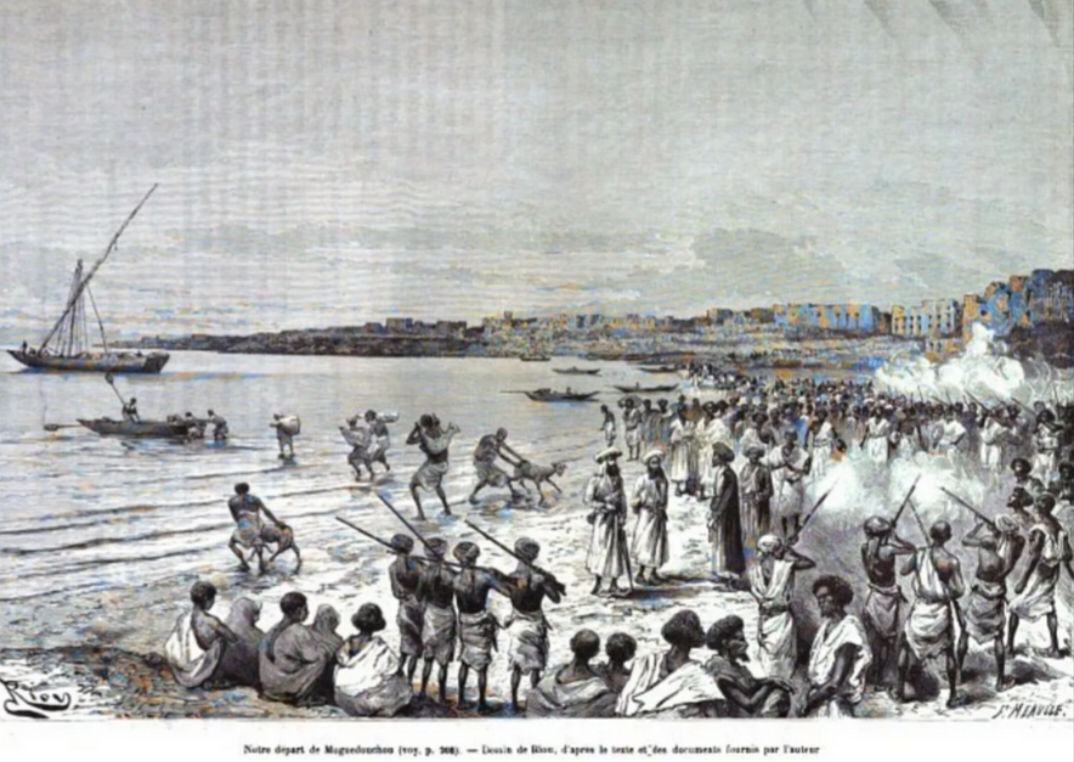
Mogadishu in 1883

The Imamate had a regular force that acted as both law enforcement and a standing army with armament supplies from the coastal provinces. It also observed sharia law, protected the trade caravans, used a powerful mounted unit that policed the state, collected taxes or tributes of cereal and livestock. It also had a regular navy that protected its shores from piracy and the Indian Ocean trade.

With such a strong civil administration and professional army, the Imamate experienced great peace and stability with a flourishing economy.

It is known in several records that the Imamate imported firearms from Aden, Djibouti and Zanzibar to maintain armed guards in Mogadishu and to defend its country borders. The Imamate was also said to have provided the Dervishes with an array of arms from the Banaadir.

== Imams of the Hiraab Mahmoud branch ==
	Ruler Name	Reign	Note
1	Imaam Ciqwaaq Maxamed Ay-bakar Gabane		Founder of the Hiraab Imamate and first Imam,
2	Imaam Yacqub Imaam Ciqwaaq		Secondy Imam, eponymous ancestor of the Yacquubi dynasty
3	Imaam Xasan Imaam Yacquub		
4	Imaam Diimaal Imaam Xasan		
5	Imaam Hilowle I Imaam Diimaal		
6	Imaam Cumar I Imaam Hilowle	1600–1646	The first imam of Mogadishu from the Yaqubi dynasty in 1624
7	Imaam Maxamud Imaam Cumar	1646–1685	
8	Imaam Axmed Imaam Maxamud	1685–1702	
9	Imaam Maxamed Imaam Axmed	1702–1744	
10	Imaam Cabdiraxman Maxamud	1750–1778	His descendants would form a cadet Imamate based in Addale
11	Imaam Caamir I Imaam Cabdiraxman	1778–1814	
12	Imaam Hilowle II Suldan Maxamed	1814–1870	Grandson of Imaam Caamir I
13	Imaam Caamir II Suldan Maxamed	1870–1928	Grandson of Imaam Hilowle II
14	Imaam Cumar II Suldan Cali	1928–1986	Grandson of Imaam Caamir
15	Imaam Maxamuud II Imaam Cumar	1986–2011	Son of Imaam Cumar, chaired the peacemaking efforts between rival Hawiye factions in the Somali civil war
16	Imaam MaxamedIslow Yuusuf Cali	2011–2021	Cousin of Imaam Maxamuud Imaam Cumar and nephew of Imaam Cumar Cali,
17	Imaam Daahir Imam Maxamud	2021–present	Son of Imaam Maxamud And he is the current Imaam of Mudulood and all Hiraab

== Yacquubi rulers of Mogadishu ==
	Ruler Name	Reign	Note
1	Imaam Eqwaq Maxamed Ay-bakar Gabane		Founder of the Hiraab Imamate and first Imam,
2	Imaam Yacqub Imaam Eqwaq		Secondy Imam, eponymous ancestor of the Yacquubi dynasty
3	Imaam Hassan Imaam Yacquub		
4	Imaam Diimaal Imaam Hassan		
5	Imaam Hilowle I Imaam Diimaal		
6	Imaam Cumar I Imaam Hilowle	1600–1646	The first imam of Mogadishu from the Yaqubi dynasty in 1624
7	Imaam Maxamud I Imaam Cumar	1646–1685	
8	Imaam Ahmed I Imaam Maxamud	1685–1702	
9	Imaam Maxamed I Imaam Ahmed	1702–1744	
10	Imaam Ali Imaam Maxamed		
11	Imaam Mohamud II Imaam ALI		
12	Imaam Osman Imaam Mohamud		
13	Imaam Mohamed II Imaam Osman	1808–1841	
14	Imaam Ahmed II Imaam Mohamed	1842–1849	During his reign, the French explorer Gulian visited the city of Mogadishu
15	Imaam Mohamed III Suldan Nur	1850–1865	
16	Imaam Mohamud III Suldan Binyaamin	1866–1907	The imam who signed the Italian protectorate for Mogadishu and its environs
17	Imaam Ahmed III Imam Mohamud	1907–1938	
18	Imaam Mohamed IIII Imam Ahmed	1939–1999	The last imam of Mogadishu

== See also ==
- Ajuran Sultanate
- Geledi Sultanate
- List of Sunni Muslim dynasties
- Hiraab
