= Adde =

Adde may refer to:

== People ==
- Adde Gabow, Somali politician
- Aden Adde, Somali politician
- Adde Musa, Puntland politician
- Jean Renaud Adde (born 1970), French equestrian
- Leo Adde (1904–1942), American jazz drummer
- Nur Adde, also known as Nur Hassan Hussein, Somali politician
- Yannick Adde (born 1969), French sailor

== Places ==
- El Adde, Somalia

== Other ==
- ADDE, Alliance for Direct Democracy in Europe
