= Ajuran =

Ajuran may refer to:

- Ajuran Sultanate, a medieval Somali empire
- Ajuran (clan), a Somali clan
- Ajuran currency, a medieval currency
