= Hilowle Imam Omar =

Somalian politician

Dr. Hilowle Imam Omar is a Somali politician who hails from the Harti abgaal clan (a subclan of abgaal). He took part in the Somali National Reconciliation Conference in Kenya. He was a member of the USC a former Mogadishu based faction.
