= Abukar Umar Adani =

Somali politician

- Occupation: Businessman
- Known for: Chief financial backer of the Islamic Courts Union

Abukar Umar Adani, also transcribed as Abukar Omar Adan, is a businessman from Mogadishu. He has been mentioned as the chief financial backer of the Islamic Courts Union. He hails of Abgaal). As of 2008, he lives in Djibouti having fled Somalia following the defeat of the ICU by Ethiopian forces. In September 2007, Adani rejected Prime Minister Ali Mohammed Ghedi's offer to return to Mogadishu and participate in the second round of the Somali National Reconciliation Conference, saying that he has no plans to return to Somalia until the Ethiopians leave. Adani offered support to the UN-sponsored Djibouti peace talks between the Transitional National Government (TNG) and Alliance for the Re-liberation of Somalia (ARS). He has been a supporter of access to humanitarian emergency aid, and his influence led the ICU to embrace the same principle of assistance to national and internal humanitarian aid agencies.
