= Faduma Sarjelle =

- Princess of Ajuran
Names
- Faduma Sarjelle Gareen
- House: Gareen
- Father: Sarjelle Gareen
- Religion: Islam

Faduma Sarjelle (Somali: Faadumo Sarjeelle Gareen) was a princess of the House of Gareen, the ruling dynasty of the Ajuran Sultanate. The Sultanate ruled over large parts of the Horn of Africa during the Middle Ages. Sarjelle was also the mother of Abgal Ismaan, the clan forefather of the Abgaal clan.

== See also ==
- Ajuran Sultanate
