= Hoosingo =

- Town
- Location in Somalia.
- Coordinates: 0°10′31″S 41°16′12″E
- Country: Somalia
- Region: Lower Jubba
- Established: Est. 1920

Government
  - District Commissioner: Nur Gure
- Elevation: 52 m (171 ft)

Population
  - Total: Est. 40 000−60 000
- Time zone: UTC+3 (EAT)

Hoosingo is a district in the southeastern Lower Juba (Jubbada Hoose) region of Somalia. It is located near the border with Kenya and has an estimated population of 40,000 to 60,000. The district is predominantly inhabited by the Sheekhal clan, mainly the Aw-qudub sub-clan, along with other Sheekhall l sub-clans such as Abiib and Abdi Sheikh. Hoosingo is one of the largest districts in Lower Juba in terms of land area and is home to over 20 towns.

== Townships ==
Towns	Estimated population	Main economic activity
Hoosingo	16,000	Trade & Livestock husbandary
Bagdad	5,000	Cattle keeping & Crop farming
Waldena	3,500	Livestock (cattle, camel and goats)
Been weerar	1,500	Livestock (cattle)
Mader Koromi	2,500	Livestock (cattle)
Deg caday	1,500	Livestock (camel, goats)
Biyo qabobe	2,000	Livestock, trade
Waraq	1,500	Livestock, trade
Dhulkena	1,000	Livestock (cattle, camel and goats)
Hargeys	650	Livestock and crop farming
Kola	1,500	LivetsLivestock (cattle, camel and goats)
Quran laga	2,000	Livestock (cattle, camel and goats)
Hirbaya	500	Livestock & crop farming
Qesan guur	1,200	LivetsLivestock (cattle, camel and goats)
Godaya	750	Livestock (cattle)
Dhabakoor	650	Livestock and crop farming
Laanta goru	1,000	Livestock and crop farming
Jimes	1,000	Livestock (cattle)
Iscora	500	Livestock (cattle)
Ramate	600	Livestock (cattle)
Allan Gogurow	750	Livestock (cattle)
Garse Kusa	650	Livestock (cattle)
Yedi	550	Livestock (cattle)

== The Battle of Hoosingo ==
On January 22, 2012, Kenya Defence Forces (KDF) soldiers were deployed to liberate Hoosingo, southern Somalia, in coordination with Somalia’s Transitional Federation Forces (TFG) and the local clan militia who were then heavily armed. The mission, part of Operation Linda Nchi, aimed to combat the Al-Shabaab militant group and stabilize the region. This deployment marked a significant step in the collaborative efforts between Kenya and Somalia to address the threat posed by Al-Shabaab.

The operation faced significant challenges from the outset. The KDF soldiers encountered an ambush by Al-Shabaab fighters, leading to a fierce two-hour battle. In the engagement, the KDF sustained casualties alongside those from the allied local clan militia. Their loss deeply impacted the morale of the troops, yet it also galvanized their determination to complete the mission.

Reinforcements arrived on April 4. The first military chaplain deployed to the front line, who played a dual role in providing both spiritual support and active combat assistance. The arrival of these reinforcements was crucial, As the KDF forces were outnumbered and facing dwindling ammunition supplies, the TFG and clan militia forces managed to hold their ground due to their superior local knowledge.

The mission culminated in a confrontation lasting over 11 hours where KDF, TFG and local soldiers killed an estimated 300 Al-Shabaab fighters and repelled an additional 700 repelled. Despite being heavily outnumbered, the troops managed to hold their ground. The battle for Hoosingo was a turning point for Operation Linda Nchi.
