= Abdirahman Yabarow =

Somali journalist

Abdirahman Yabarow عبد الرحمن يابارو
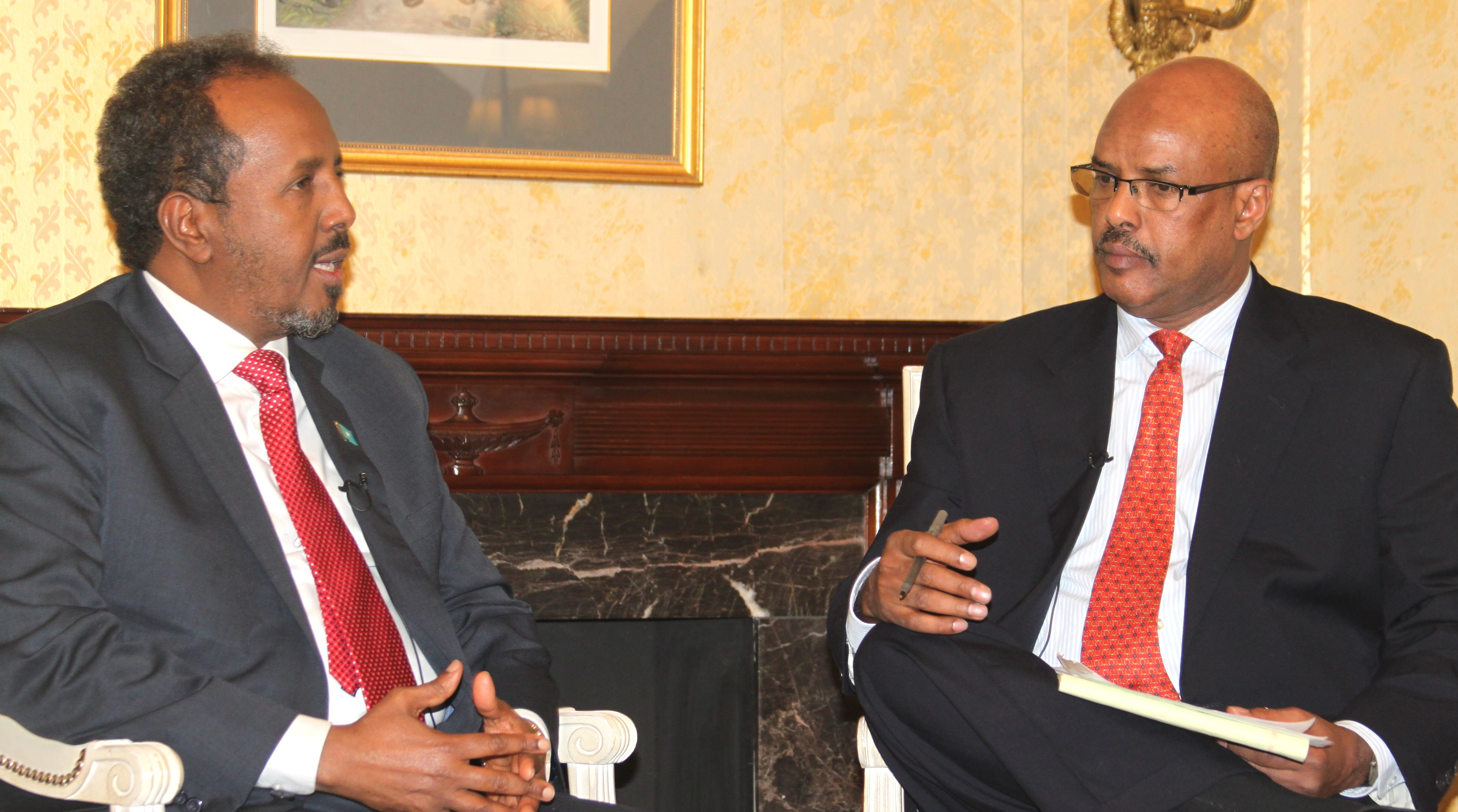
- Yabarow with Hassan Sheikh Mohamud (left).
- Born: Somalia
- Occupation: journalist
- Title: Editor-in-Chief of the VOA Somali Service
- Children: Muqbil Yabarow

Abdirahman Yabarow (Somali: Cabdiraxmaan Yabarow, Arabic: عبد الرحمن يابارو) is a Somali journalist. He hails from the Abgaal Hawiye clan. In the early 2000s, Yabarow worked in the UNDP's Documentation Unit. He later served as a Washington, D.C. correspondent for the BBC's Somali service. In 2009, Yabarow was appointed the Editor-in-Chief of the VOA's Somali service.
