= Abdi Mohamed Ulusso =

Somali politician

Dr. Abdi Mohamed Ulusso (born July 1, 1958, Mogadishu) is a Somali politician who ran for the Somali presidency in 2003. He hails from the Wacbudhan clan (an Abgaal subclan). He has served as Guddoomiyaha Golaha Midnimada Mudulood (GGMM), or Chairman of the United Mudulood Congress. He received his doctoral degree in education and political science from Cornell University.
