= Hassan Geedi Abtow =

Malaaq Hassan Geedi Abtow (1840–1926) better known as Malaaqa Xamar iyo Xamar Daye was a famous elder and leader of the Abgaal subclan Reer Mataan said to have reigned from the beginning of the Colonial Era.

He was known for being a highly gifted and wise speaker with many stories originating about him.

The Malaaq is historically noted for challenging every adversary of his time. Starting with the Sultan of Zanzibar, Said Bargash, the Malaaq compelled the Sultan to pay him taxes for the use of the Port of Mogadishu and access to key routes out of the city. This caused the Sultan of Zanzibar who was briefly under weak British protection, to sell his shares of the Benadir coast entirely to Italy, worth 140,000 pounds, on the 12th August 1892 and to retreat back to Zanzibar. Malaakh Hassan would also later challenge the Italians, being dubbed by them as the "Gandhi of Somalia".

Hassan Geedi Abtow Road, a street in Mogadishu, was also named after the Malaaq by the Siad Barre Military Regime.
