= Farah Weheliye Addo =

Farah Wehelie
- Born: 1935 or 1940
- Died: 19 November 2008 (aged 68 or 73); Egypt
- Occupation: Sports administrator

Farah Weheliye Addo (Somali: Faarax Wehliye Caddoow, Arabic: فرح ادو), also known as Sindiko (born 1935 or 1940, died November 19, 2008), was a prominent Somali sports administrator.

== Biography ==
Addo hailed from the Harti Abgaal clan. He spent many years in a leadership role in international sports. A former referee, he would later become chairman of the Somali Football Association, the Council for East and Central Africa Football Associations, and of the Somali Olympic Committee. Farah was also a former first vice-president of the African Football Confederation (CAF) and an Honorary Member of the organisation.

Addo died on Wednesday November 19, 2008 in Egypt, at the age of 73.
