= Ajuran (clan) =

Somali clan

Ajuran اجوران
- Hawiye Somali clan
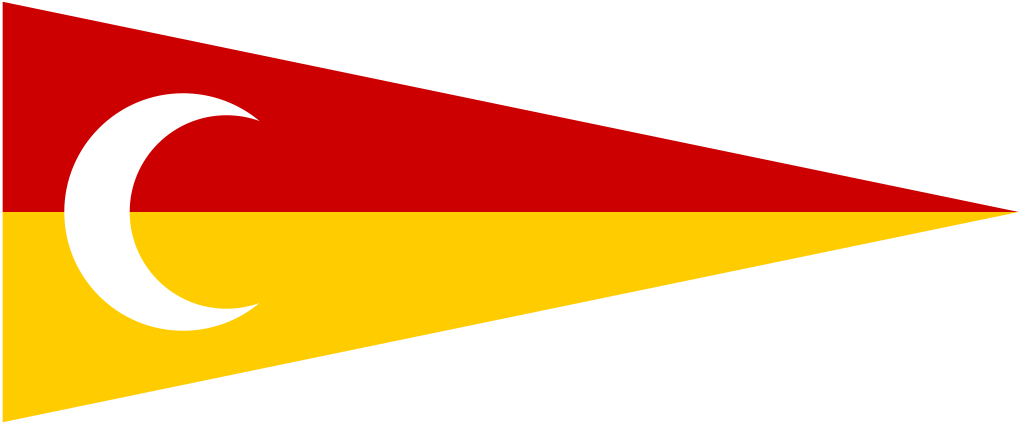
- Flag of the Ajuran Sultanate
- Ethnicity: (Somalia) Somali
- Location: (Somalia) Somalia; Kenya; Ethiopia
- Descended from: Sheikh Ahmed Bin Abdulrahman Bin Uthman
- Parent tribe: Hawiye
- Language: (Somalia) af-Somali
- Religion: Sunni Islam

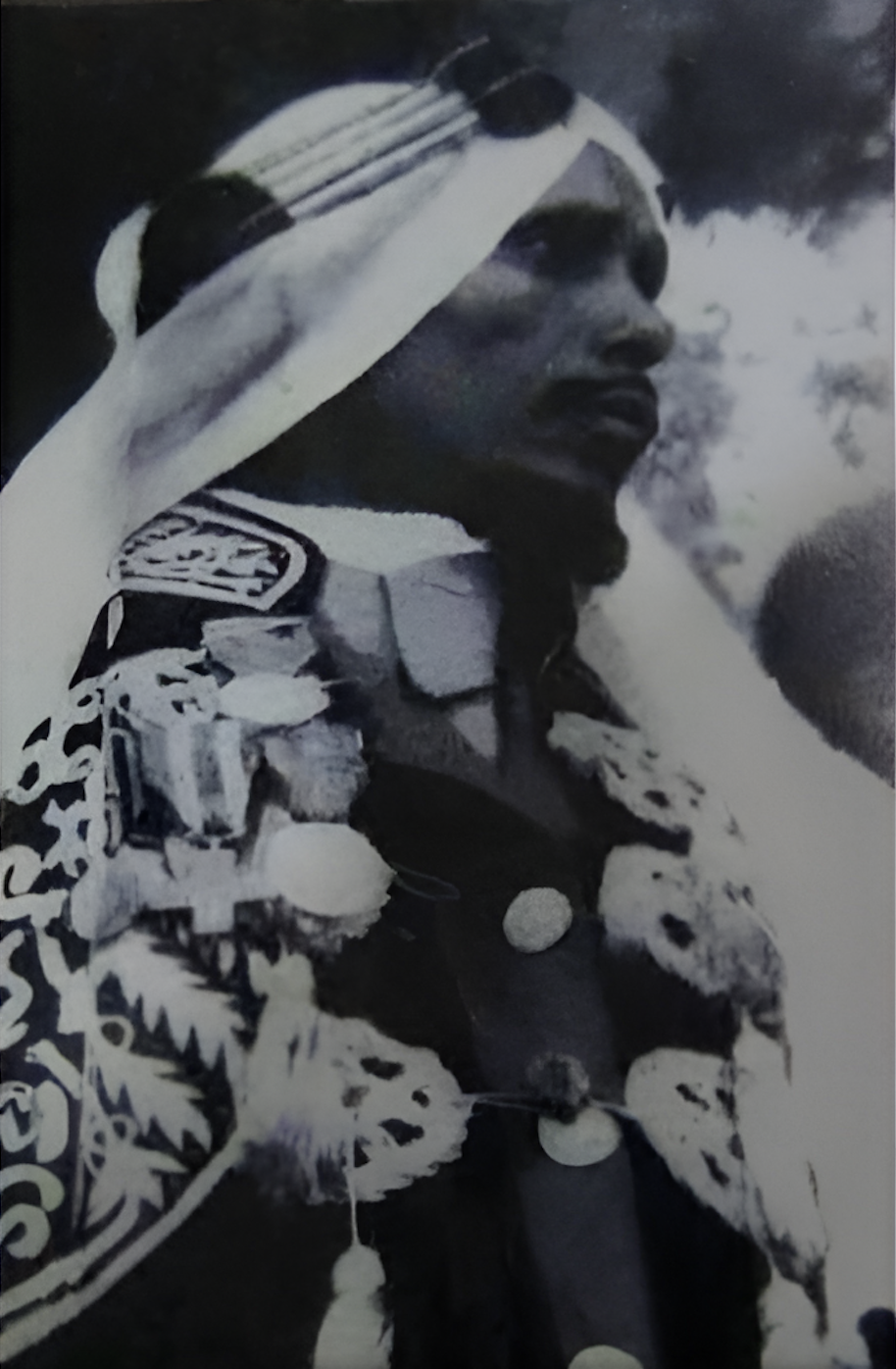
Olol Dinle

The Ajuran (Somali: Ajuuraan, Beesha Ajuuraan, Moorshe, Arabic: أجوران) is a Somali clan, part of the Hawiye clan family.

The clan is historically associated with the Ajuran Sultanate, a Muslim political formation that exercised authority over substantial parts of southern Somalia and the Shabelle valley.

Although accounts differ concerning the clan's ancestry. Some academics record it being genealogically descended from Jambele Hawiye, others academics like I. M. Lewis , Mohamed Haji Mukhtar and Lee Cassaneli record that the Ajuran traced paternal descent from another ancestor, Bal'ad and were related maternally to the Hawiye through marriage with Fadumo Jambelle.

The clan is historically associated with the Ajuran Sultanate, a political formation described in Somali oral traditions as having exercised authority over a large part of southern Somalia between approximately the late fifteenth and mid-seventeenth centuries.

Ajuran members largely inhabit Kenya as well as southern east Ethiopia; considerable numbers are also found in southern Somalia. Some Ajuran members are settled in Mogadishu.

== Overview ==
The Ajuran are a Somali clan and historical community found principally in northeastern Kenya, the Somali Region of Ethiopia, and parts of southern Somalia. They primarily speak Somali, although some Ajuran communities in northern Kenya also speak Borana.

The clan is historically associated with the Ajuran Sultanate, a Muslim political formation that exercised authority over substantial parts of southern Somalia and the Shabelle valley.

The Ajuran are said to be part of the Jambelle Hawiye Although Mohamed Haji Mukhtar and I'm Lewis record another tradition in which the Ajuran descend from a marriage between Bal'ad, and Faduma, a daughter of Jamballe Hawiye. Lee V. Cassanelli similarly notes that some traditions trace Ajuran ancestry through Balad, who may have had Arab antecedents, while others connect the Ajuran with the Hawiye through the maternal line.

They displaced from modern Hawiye territories in the late 17th to early 18th centuries due to historical conflicts particularly in South Central Somalia.

Though as common as it is to find clan lineages with elaborate stories of founding genealogies via trees and wells for clans and even ethnic groups due to pre-eminence, much like some Isaaq traditions of claiming a maternal affinity with the Dir despite the Dir traditions of Isaaq being a paternal descent, the Ajuran are also said to be Hawiye by paternal descent according to Hawiye traditions as mentioned by Mohamed Ibrahim Liqliiqato and Colonial explorers who visited the Kelafo region such as Luigi Robecci Bricchetti, where the Ajuran had occupied an important central role within the Hawiye in the past and until recently.

Lee Cassanelli in his 1982 book "The Shaping of Somali Society: Reconstructing the History of a Pastoral People, 1600-1900" often refers to the Ajuran as former leaders of a Hawiye clan dynasty.

== History ==
Antiquity

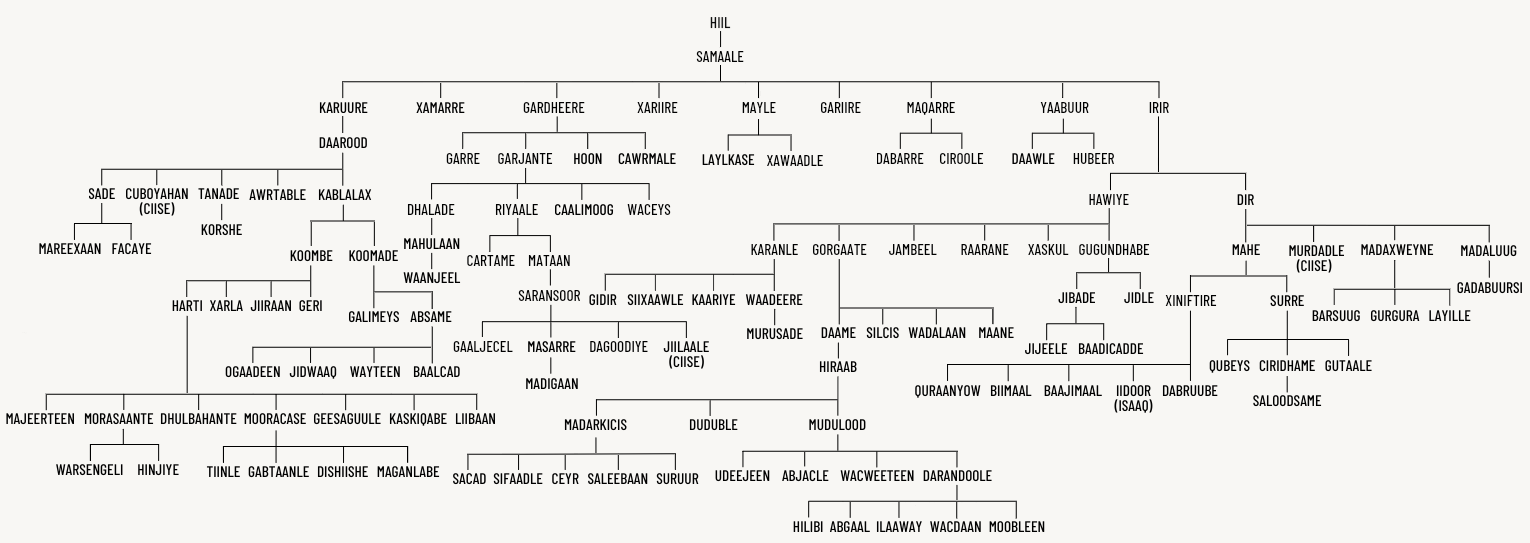
Genealogical tree of Somali clans

Many traditions link the Ajuran with a people known to the Somalis as Madanle (Maantiiinle. Madinle, etc.) who were celebrated well-diggers in southern Somalia and northeastern Kenya.

Ajuran Empire

The Ajuran clan established the Garen Dynasty that ruled both Mogadishu Sultanate and Ajuran Sultanate during the Middle Ages.

Early Modern Period

During the early modern period, in the 19th century, under Sultan Olol Dinle, the Ajuran Sultanate was almost revived. He was described as the "Sultan of Sciavelli (Shabelle) and Auia (Hawiye)" in the early 1930s. Not long after would Olol Dinle be accused of conspiring with the Italians against the Ethiopian government. He was assassinated by Haile Salassie in 1960.

== Language ==
The Ajuran in Somalia normally speak standard Somali while those in the riverside communities of Hirshabelle speak Maay Maay. As for the Ajuran in Kenya, the linguistic case is more complex. The Wallemugge section are often bilingual in Somali and Borana. However most sources state that Somali is the dominant language in the North Eastern Province, so bilingual speakers are many among the Ajuran who live in Moyale where the Borana language is prevalent.

== Clan Tree ==
This Clan Tree is based on "The Total Somali Clan Genealogy (second edition)" by Abbink, G.J.

- Hill
  - Samaale
    - Irir
      - Hawiye
        - Jambelle
          - Ajuran
            - Garen
            - Gelberis
            - Yibidalla
            - Gashe
            - Dulhata
            - Waqle
          - Hintere
          - Garure
          - Arure
          - Olagir

Mohamed Haji Mukhtar , Gunther Schlee and I'm Lewis and Lee Cassaneli record a tradition in which the Ajuran descend from Bal'ad, and Faduma, a daughter of Jambelle.

Paternal line

- Bal'ad
  - Allama
    - Ajuran

Maternal Hawiye line

- Samaale
  - Irir
    - Hawiye
      - Jambelle
        - Fadumo
          - Ajuran

== Notable people ==
- Faduma Sarjelle, princess
- Dhaqsoore. House of Gareen member
- Rasul ibn Ali, sultan

== Sources ==
- Mukhtar, Mohamed Haji (2003). Historical Dictionary of Somalia. Scarecrow Press. ISBN 978-0-8108-6604-1.
- Lewis, Ioan M. (1994). Blood and Bone: The Call of Kinship in Somali Society. Lawrencewill, NJ: The Red Sea Press. ISBN 0-932415-93-8.
