= Ismail Jim'ale Osoble =

Somali politician

Dr. Ismail Jim'ale Osoble (Somali: Ismaaciil Jimcaale Cosoble, Arabic: اسماعيل جمعال عسبلي) was a Somali lawyer and the Minister of Information in the government of Aden Abdullah Osman Daar shortly before the military coup d'état of 1969. Following those events, he was one of the few lawyers and human rights activists in the country. He was also one of the signers of the Somali Manifesto.

Following his death, a group of Somali human rights activists, led by his widow Maryan Awreye (second wife), founded the Dr. Ismail Jumale Human Rights Organization which still works in Somalia.

== Biography ==
Osoble was born on 18 July 1931 in the town of Beledweyne, the regional capital the Hiran province in south-central Somalia. He was the second of three children born to a family of the Abgaal Hawiye clan. He studied Law in Italy where he met and married (Rome, 1965) his first wife Iole Berardi from whom he had two children. Following his imprisonment during the military coup in 1969, his first wife and children were forced to return to Italy where they have remained. He died in Rome on 22 July 1990.

== Notes ==
Si eran dimenticati i parenti poveri sulla panchina.
