= Farah Gololeey =

Somali poet (1907–1978)

Faarax Maxamad Cali, (known as Farah Gololeey, 1907–1978), was a Somali poet, political oracle and philanthropist. He served as an MP from 1965 to 1969. Farah had an unusual relationship with Heads of State, who would visit him for advice on national guidance and cementing ties with different urban groups and clans in the country.

Farah was a master of rhetoric and conceptualising cosmic irony.

Farah was born in Balcad district, in Gololeey town, in the former Benadir region of Somalia. He was born in 1907 and died in 1978.
