= Adde Gabow =

Somali politician

Mohamed Ali Hassan (Somali: Maxamed Cali Xasan [Cadde Gaaboow]), known as Adde Gabow, is a Somali politician. He is the former governor of the Banaadir region and was appointed mayor of the capital Mogadishu by President Abdullahi Yusuf Ahmed on 15 January 2007.
