= Sheekhaal =

Somali clan

Sheikhaal بنو شيخال
- Somali clan
- Ethnicity: Somali
- Location: (Ethiopia) Ethiopia; Somalia
- Descended from: Abadir Umar ar-Rida
- Branches: Qudub Fiqi Umar (Reer Aw Qudub); Ahmed Fiqi Umar (Reer Axmed Loobage); Haasan Fiqi Umar (Reer Aw Xasan); Mohamed Fiqi Umar (Sheekhaal jaziira); Osman Fiqi Umar (Sheekhaal Gendershe)
- Language: (Somalia) Somali (Arab League) Arabic
- Religion: Sunni Islam

The Sheekhaal (var. Sheikhaal, Arabic: شيخال), also known as Fiqi Cumar, is a clan that inhabits Somalia, Ethiopia, Djibouti and with considerable numbers also found in the Northern Frontier District (NFD) in Kenya.

== Overview ==
Sheekhal traces its ancestry to Sheikh Abadir Umar Ar-Rida, also known as Fiqi Umar, who in turn traced his lineage to the first caliph, Abu Bakr (Sayid Abubakar Al-Sadiq).

According to the explorer Richard F. Burton, in his book First Footsteps in East Africa, the Sheekhaal are described as the only Somalis who maintain a tradition of genealogy not derived from Dir and Darood. They claim descent from "Caliph Abu Bakr" and asserted that their ancestor Khutab bin Fakih Umar crossed over from Al-Hijaz to the Horn of Africa. Fiqi Umar crossed over with his six sons: Umar the Greater, Umar the Lesser, the two Abdillahs, Ahmad and Siddik. Sheikh Ar-Rida is also regarded the patron saint of Harar. The lineage goes back to Banu Taym, through the first Caliph Abu Bakr.

Some clans of Sheekhaal would argue that while they are politically aligned with the larger Hawiye clan, this does not mean that they are Hawiye. This view is shared by the Aw-Qutub, one of the Sheekhaal subclans; they too totally reject the notion that the Sheekhal clan are part of Hawiye. Lobogay (Loboge) are considered part of (Hiraab, Aw Qudub and Gendershe and Ali).

Lewis (1982) mentions that the largest clan of the Sheikhal is the Reer Fiqi Omar, whose most important lineage, the Reer Aw Qutub, inhabit the Somali Region of Ethiopia. The Sheekhal clans were reportedly considered as part of the Hawiye politically until after the civil war.

General Mohamed Ibrahim Liiqliqato, who was a Sheikhal, described in his book how the Sheikhal became associated with the Hawiye and added as ‘Martileh Hiraab’ (literally meaning guests of Hiraab). The Sheekhaal are also mentioned to be one of the religious groups of Somalia along with the Asharaf.

The Wardiq a now sub clan of Issa are historically associated with the Sheekhal.

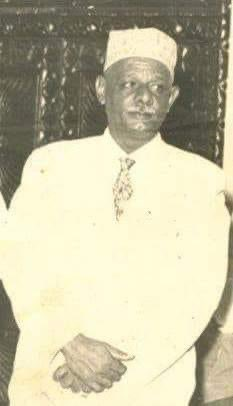
Mohammed Sheikh Jamal- Mayor of Mogadishu

== Sheekhaal clans ==
1. Reer Aw Qudub (Qudub Fiqi Cumar)
2. Reer Axmed Loobage (Ahmed fiqicumar)
3. Reer Aw Xasan (Xasan fiqicumar)
4. Sheekhaal jaziira (Mohamed fiqicumar)
5. Sheekhaal Gendershe (Cismaan fiqicumar)

== Prominent figures ==
- Abdulrahman Kinana, first Speaker of the East African Legislative Assembly, 2001–2006; former Deputy Minister of Foreign Affairs and Minister of Defence of Tanzania.
- Mohamed Ibrahim Liqliiqato, Prominent Somali politician, diplomat, and Major General from Kismayo lower Jubba region. He was a Somali ambassador to the Soviet Union, and ambassador to West-Germany in 1970s. He also held the ministry of Agriculture and Interior ministry. He is the longest-serving speaker of the parliament, holding the position from 1982 to 1991. The Liiqliiqato bridge in Beledwen named after him.
- Mohammed Hussein Ali, former commissioner of the Kenya Police and Major General.
- Dahir Adan Elmi, chief of Somali Armed Forces, major general and the commander of Qabdir-Daharre Battalion in Somalia-Ethiopian War in 1977 who won bravery golden award that war. He is regarded as the most decorated general in Somali army.

== See also ==
- Wardiq
