= Hawiye =

Somali clan family

Hawiye بنوهوية
- Somali clan
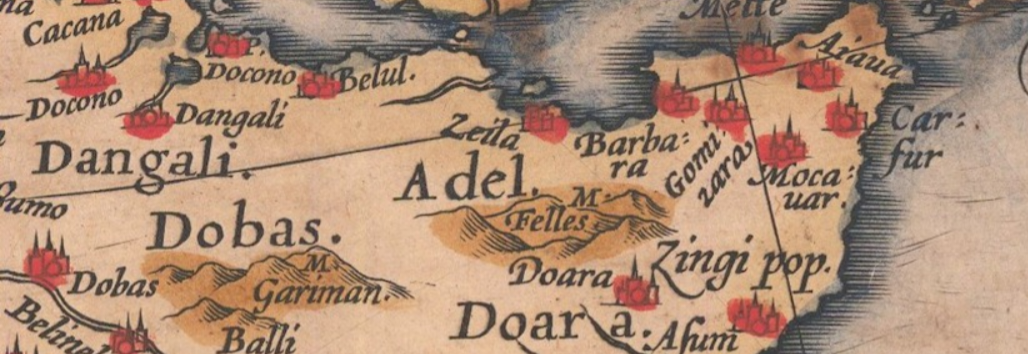
- Medieval Portuguese map of the Horn of Africa. The Hawiye (Aiaua) held an important polity where the Indian Ocean and the Red Sea converged.
- Ethnicity: Somali
- Nisba: Al-Hawiyah الحاوية
- Location: Somalia; Ethiopia; Kenya; Yemen
- Descended from: Sheikh Ahmed (Hawiye)
- Parent tribe: Samaale
- Branches: Bah Arbera: Karanle; Xaskul; Raarane; Bah Ghirei: Gurgarte; Gugundabe; Jambeelle
- Language: Somali; Arabic
- Religion: Sunni Islam

The Hawiye (Somali: Hawiye; Arabic: بنو هوية) are one of the principal and largest of the Somali clans, tracing their lineage back to Sheikh Ahmed Bin Abdulrahman Bin Uthman, also known as Sheikh Hawiye, the eponymous figure of the clan. They are considered the earliest documented clan to have settled in the Somali peninsula, as noted in the 12th century by Al-Idrisi, occupying the regions spanning from Ras Hafun to Merca, which served as their capital. Presently, the Hawiye reside in central and southern Somalia, Somaliland, Djibouti, Ethiopia (specifically the Afar Region, Harari Region, Oromia, and the Somali Region), as well as Kenya (specifically the North Eastern Province and Eastern Province). Furthermore, they represent the majority of the population in the capital city of Mogadishu.

The Hawiye have historically exercised authority over large sections of the Horn of Africa as Sovereign Sultans and Imams overseeing crucial trade routes that have existed since the early periods of Somali maritime history. The coastal regions experienced a vibrant expansion of foreign trade and commerce, with numerous ships traversing between multiple kingdoms and empires in East Asia, South Asia, Europe, the Middle East, North Africa, and East Africa making them very affluent. This political and economic influence continued to have relevance well into the modern age, with the Hawiye clan playing a pivotal and historically significant role in laying the foundations of the Somali nation. The enduring legacy of the Hawiye's governance and control over trade routes has left a lasting impact on the development and shaping of Somalia.

== Origins and Etymology ==
Sheikh Hawiye, also known as Ahmed based on oral traditions and Arabic hagiologies, is renowned as a revered saint and religious figure who bore the epithet "Hawi al 'Uluum", meaning the conservator of knowledge, denoting his mastery of Islamic knowledge. Through the passage of time, this appellation was condensed to just "Hawiyah" or "Hawiye" and subsequently evolved into the ethnonym of his progeny. The genealogy of Sheikh Hawiye, as delineated in these oral narratives, Arabic hagiologies, and indigenous manuscripts, can be traced as follows: Ahmed (Hawiye) Bin Abdulrahman (Irir) Bin Uthman (Samaale) Bin Muhammed Bin Hanbal Bin Mahdi Bin Ahmed Bin Mohammed Bin Aqeel Bin Abu Talib.

It is through these sources that the lineage of Sheikh Hawiye can be comprehensively understood and appreciated within the broader historical and cultural contexts. Some scholars consider these genealogical claims as historically untenable, but instead argue that they reflect a longstanding cross cultural exchange between Somalia and Southern Arabia. According to the British anthropologist and Somali Studies veteran Ioan Lewis, the traditions of descent from noble Arab families related to the Prophet are most probably figurative expressions of the importance of Islam in Somali society. However, "there is a strong historically valid component in these legends."

Hawiye, the eldest son of Irir, is known to have a sibling named Aji, whose actual name is documented in oral traditions and further supported by Al Idrus's work "History of Somalia" as Ismail, the father of Dir, also known as Abu-Bakr. Hawiye was married to two women, from whom he had six sons. The first wife, Arbera, hailing from Arab lineage, bore him three sons - Karanle, Xaskul, and Raarane. On the other hand, his second wife, Ghirei, belonging to an early Harari, gave birth to Gugundhabe, Gorgarte, and Jambeelle. This genealogical account of Hawiye's family structure is crucial in understanding the historical lineage and heritage of the Hawiye. The oral traditions and written sources provide valuable insights into the familial connections and societal structures prevalent to this day.

The tomb of Shiekh Hawiye can be found in Qundhuro, situated within the Haraghe region, which served as his primary residence for the later years of his life as a revered Sheikh who dedicated himself to the propagation of the teachings of Islam. Alongside Shiekh Hawiye rests his eldest son, Karanle, in a burial site. The Hawiye furthered the spread of Islam in the Horn of Africa.

== Distribution ==
The Hawiye are believed to be the largest Somali clan and comprise the majority in Somalia as well as the majority in the NFD region of Kenya according to respective censuses. The origin and traditional homeland of the Hawiye is believed to be in the Somali Region of Ethiopia, where he was preceded by the arrival of his Samaale ancestors in the areas between Djibouti and Somaliland, before descending southeast and along the Shabelle Valley.

In Somalia, Hawiye subclans inhabit the fertile lands along the Shabelle River of Beledweyne located in the Hiran region. Their territory stretches from the coastline just south of Mogadishu to the north of the historic port town of Hobyo in the central Mudug region. The Hawiye constitute the majority in the Hirshabelle state of Somalia, with the Abgaal clan being present while in Galmudug Hawiye are the majority as well. The Hawiye also have a second majority presence in the South West State region, They can also be found in Jubbaland. The Fiqishini subclan of the Habar Gidir inhabit the Sool region of Somaliland.

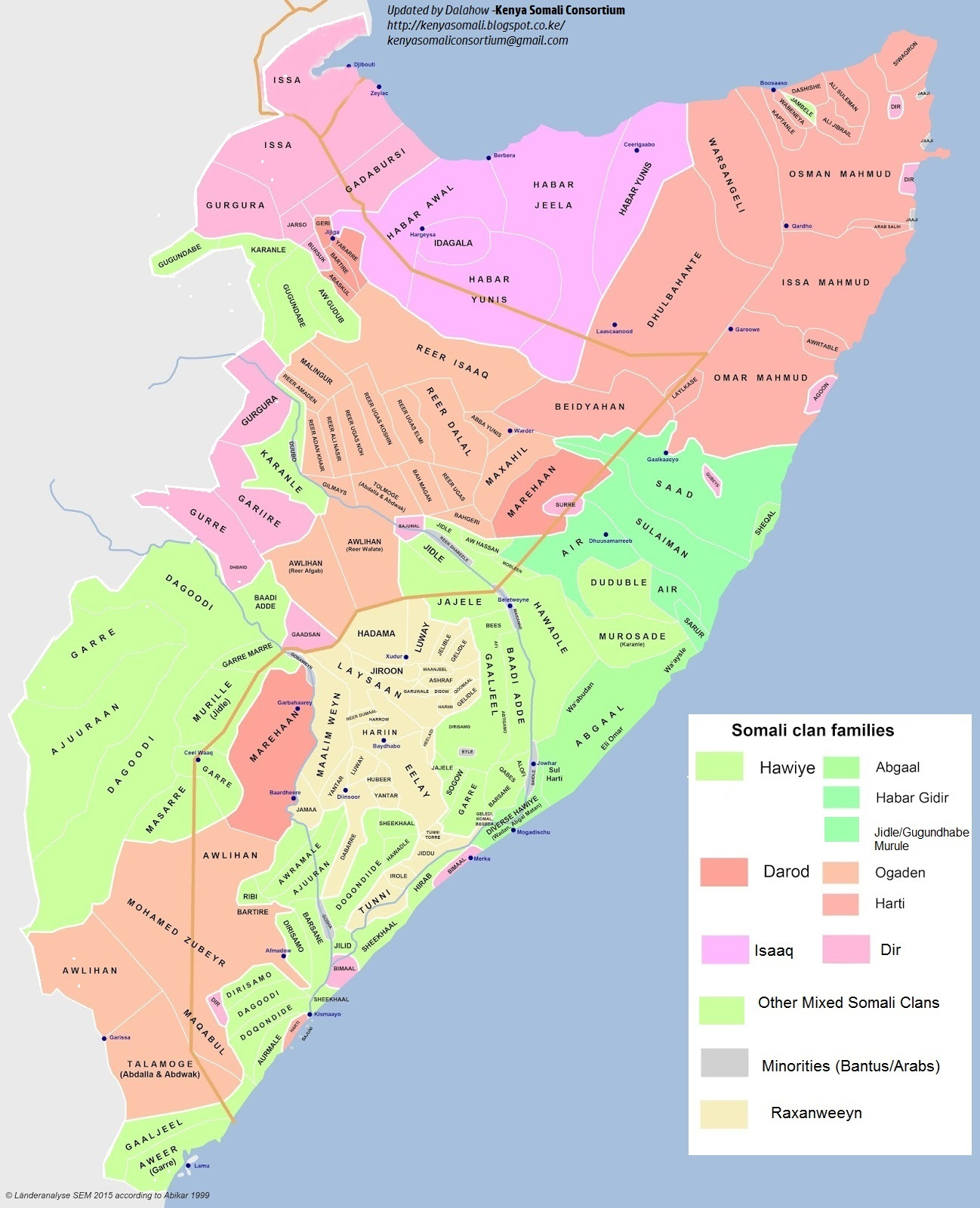
NRC clan map of Greater Somalia

The Hawiye also live in their traditional birthplace Ethiopia, holding a sizeable population in the Somali Region of Ethiopia as well as cities like Babile in the Oromia region. In the southern parts of the Somali Region, Hawiye can be found in many zones, and are majority in 3/9 of the zones, namely the Liben zone and the Shabelle zone. They can also be found in many other zones, such as the Afdheer, Dollo, Sitti, Erer, Faafan and Korahe zone.

In Kenya, the Hawiye can also be found in the North Eastern Province (Kenya) region of Kenya where the Degoodi sub-clan is 3rd majority out of Somali clans in Kenya and the majority in the Wajir region, followed by another Hawiye sub-clan, the Ajuran and then the Murule who are the majority of the Mandera region as shown in the Kenyan census.

Major Hawiye cities inhabited by the Hawiye clan consist of the capital of Somalia, Mogadishu, along with various other cities such as Beledweyne, Galkayo, Babile, Dusmareb, Jowhar, Wajir and Mandera.

== Sultanates ==
The Hawiye has produced various sultanates, some of which ruled large parts of the Horn of Africa. Some of these include:

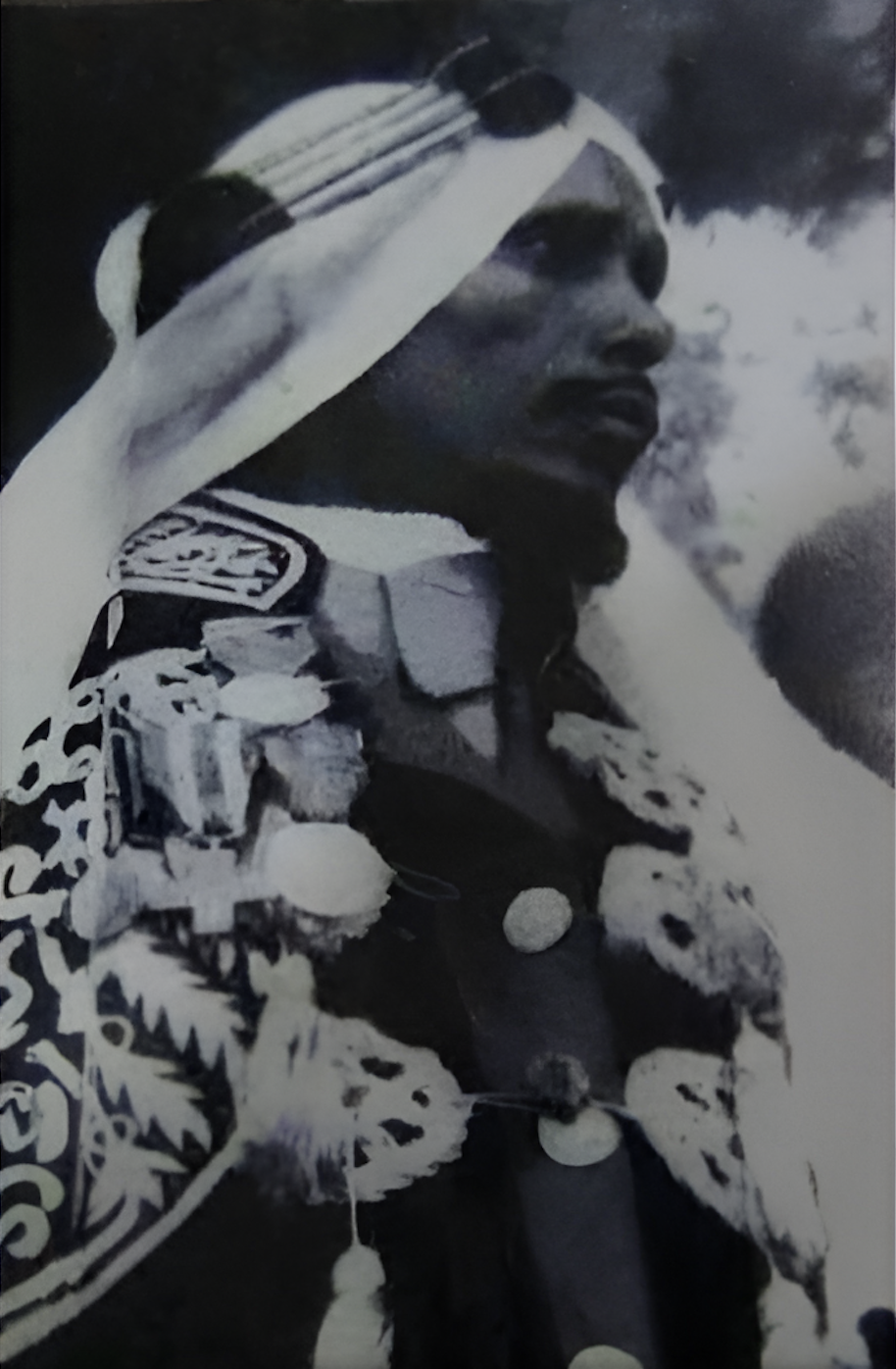
Official portrait of Ajuran Sultan Olol Dinle c. 1936

The Ajuran Sultanate, which was led by the Ajuran sub-clan of the Hawiye. Specifically the Ajuran are said to be part of the Jambelle Hawiye but became displaced from modern Hawiye territories in the late 17th to early 18th centuries due to historical conflict particularly in South Central Somalia. Lee Cassanelli in his 1982 book "The Shaping of Somali Society: Reconstructing the History of a Pastoral People, 1600-1900" often refers to the Ajuran as former leaders of a Hawiye clan dynasty. They belonged to the Somali Muslim sultanate that ruled over large parts of the Horn of Africa in the Middle Ages. Trading routes dating from the ancient and early medieval periods of Somali maritime enterprise were strengthened or re-established, and foreign trade and commerce in the coastal provinces flourished with ships sailing to and coming from many kingdoms and empires in East Asia, South Asia, Europe, the Near East, North Africa and East Africa. The Ajuran Empire's sphere of influence in the Horn of Africa was one of the largest in the region. The empire covered much of southern Somalia and eastern Ethiopia, with its domain extending from Hobyo in the north, to Qelafo in the west, to Kismayo in the south.

The Hiraab Imaamate, also known as the Yacquubi Dynasty, which was governed by the Hiraab sub-clan of the Hawiye. It was founded by Imam Omar who successfully rebelled and defeated the Ajuran and established an independent kingdom. By 1700, the Hiraab and other clans occupied a large territory stretching the interior from the Shabelle valley to the arid lands of Mudug and to the coastal areas of Mogadishu towards Hobyo. After the immediate fall of the Ajuuraan, the Hiraab established an independent rule for at least two centuries. It was called Regno di Magadozo or the Kingdom of Magadoxo in official medieval bulletins, and at their peak, they would go on to dominate what became Greater Benadir.

These sultanates both ruled over present-day Somalia, Kenya and Ethiopia. Minor Hawiye sultanates throughout these periods include the southern reigns of the Lama Jidle (Afgoi) Sultanate of the Silcis and the El Amir (Merca) dynasty of the Wadalaan. In the north, minor sultanates of the Sultanate of Bale and the Imamate of Aussa (preceded by Hubat and Harar principalities), were led by members of the Ajuran and the Karanle, respectively. Under these major and minor sultanates, Somalia flourished and various key port cities and towns were created. Explorer John Kirk arrived in southern Somalia in 1873 during a period of great economic prosperity with the region being dominated by the Imamate and the Geledi Sultanate. Kirk met Imam Mahmood who reigned over Mogadishu. Trade between the Hiraab of Mogadishu and the Geledi Sultanate led by Ahmed Yusuf was flourishing. Kirk noted a variety of other things. Roughly 20 large dhows were docked in both Mogadishu and Merka respectively filled with grain produced from the farms of the Geledi in the interior with much of the trade being destined for Zanzibar.

== Role and Influence in Somalia ==
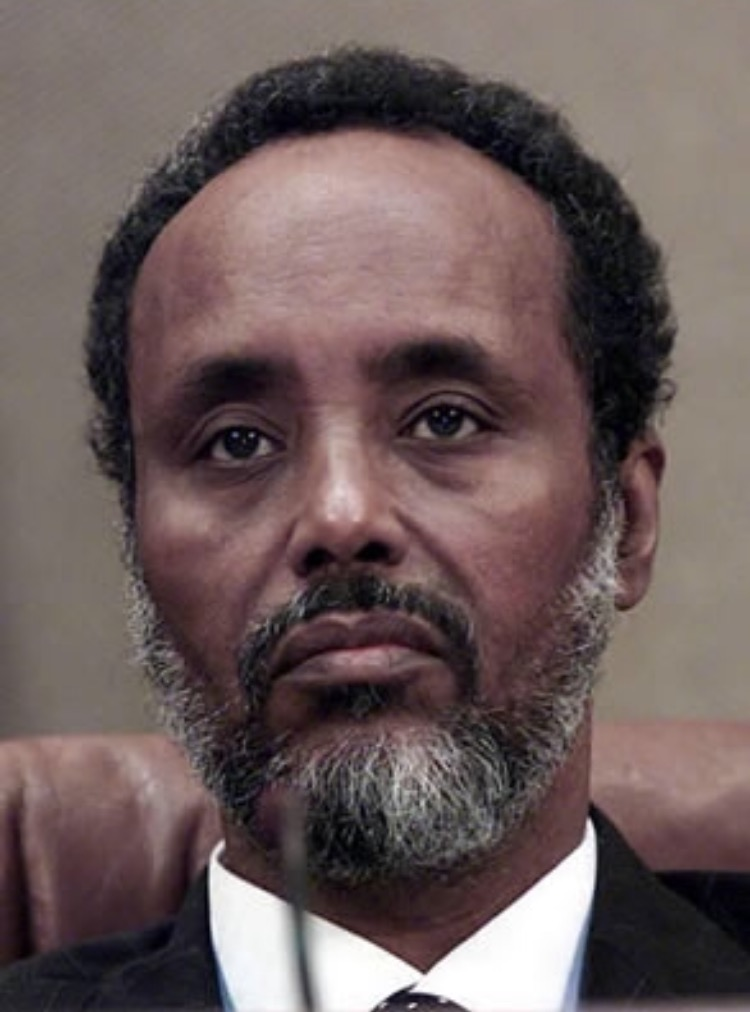
Former Somali President Abdiqasim salad Hassan

The Hawiye have historically played a foundational role in Somalia. The majority of Somalia's founding fathers hailed from the Hawiye. At Independence in 1960, the first President, Prime Minister, Parliamentary Speaker and the Father of the Somali Military were all Hawiye. Aden Adde the first President and Speaker was Udeejeen. The first Prime Minister Abdullahi Issa was Habar Gidir. The father of the Somali Military Daud Abdulle Hirsi was Abgaal. As was the initiator of the October revolution coup d'état in 1969, Brigadier General Salaad Gabeyre Kediye. The military leader to overthrow and exile the successor of the coup President Siad Barre of the Supreme Revolutionary Council in 1991 before fighting and defeating subsequent US occupying forces (1993-1995) was General Mohamed Farrah Aidid, a Habar Gidir. Since then the Hawiye have produced five more Presidents and four more Prime Ministers.

The Hawiye elite played a leading role during the Somali Rebellion in opposing the post civilian era dictatorship of President Siad Barre under the auspices of SODAF, the SSDF and the Somali National Movement (SNM) before converging to form their own branch the infamous United Somali Congress (USC). The long-standing clan conflicts that had engulfed other clans in the rest of the country under the ex dictatorship continued unabated into the late 90s with its eventual victors setting up autonomous regional states (Somaliland and Puntland) while Mogadishu underwent a new Civil War starting in late 1991 with the city divided between warring Hawiye factions of Aidid and Abgaal President Ali Mahdi. Despite 2 interim governments built from Djibouti and supplanted in the capital with its elected Hawiye Presidencies in Ali Mahdi Muhammad in 1991 and Abdiqasim Salad Hassan (Habargidir) a decade later, 14 national peace conferences throughout their tenures and a 3-year UN/US humanitarian & peacekeeping intervention (1992-1995), the Mogadishu Civil War remained a stalemate until 2006 which saw the rise of the popular Islamic Courts Union (ICU), a predominately Hawiye-based Islamic Fundamentalist Organisation that ended the rule of factional warlords and their chiefdoms, with the ICU promoting religious reform while conquering large parts of the country. But even with its moderate leadership and revolutionary appeal, the International Community, encouraged by the US global War on Terror campaign, endorsed a historically damaging Ethiopian Occupation to overthrow the ICU and prop the weak internationally recognised interim federal government (TFG) of President Abdullahi Yusuf, a Darod Majerteen, which was built in Kenya in 2004 and based there before moving into the city of Baidoa. With the TFG reliant on neighbours Ethiopia and Kenya, adopting their principles of federalism and in particular imitating the state structure of the Federal Republic of Ethiopia, the moderate ICU leadership moved to Djibouti and Eritrea in exile, eventually returning to power under a new name, the Alliance for the Re-liberation of Somalia (ARS) and successfully ending the Ethiopian occupation. A coalition of sorts in later successive governments have since been formed, with new challenges posed by radical offshoots Al-Shabaab, an Alqaeda affiliate takfeer group notorious for bomb attacks that hasn't spared the old, the women or the children though claiming to solely fight the Government and its partners from the African Union peacekeeping forces.

The Hawiye figure prominently in many important fields of Somali society such as the Business & Media sector. For example, Abdirahman Yabarow, the editor-in-chief of VOA Somali is kin. Yusuf Garaad Omar who was the Chairman of BBC Somali for over a decade and helped pioneer its rise during his tenure, is also a member. As are the heads of major national corporations - Jubba Airways and Hormuud Telecom.

Currently the Hawiye play a leading role in the regional states of Galmudug, Hirshabelle and Benadir (Mogadishu), but also in Somalia and among the Somali people as a whole.

== History ==
According to 12th-century author Al-Idrisi, the Hawiye clan occupied the coastal areas between Ras Hafun and Merca, as well as the lower basin of the lower Shabelle river. Al-Idrisi's mention of the Hawiye is the first documentary reference to a specific Somali group in the Horn of Africa. Later Arab writers also make references to the Hawiye clan in connection with both Merca and the lower Shabelle valley. Ibn Sa'id (1214–74), for instance, considered Merca to be the capital of the Hawiye, who lived in fifty villages on the bank of a river which he called "the nile of Mogadishu, a clear reference to the Shabelle river.

One must mention the Hawīya and Garğēda who are also represented as clan families or clans among the Somali. Both groups seem to have been long established in the Sultanate of Bale: the early immigrants from Merca started from a Hawiya-occupied region and oral traditions relate the Garğēda with the time of the "holy war" in the 1530s.

Along with Rahanweyn, the Hawiye clan also came under the Ajuran Empire control in the 13th century that governed much of southern Somalia and eastern Ethiopia, with its domain extending from Hobyo in the north, to Qelafo in the west, to Kismayo in the south.

Known to medieval writers as the Ajan Coast Harold Marcus credits the role of the Hawiye-led commonwealth alliance in expanding and islamizing the communities of what is now southeast Ethiopia and southern Somalia during the 15th and 16th centuries.

The Hawiye are also featured in the early history of the northern Ifat Sultanate during the reign of Emperors Zara Yaqob and Amda Seyon I. Sabr ad-Din of Ifat who declared war on Amda Seyon, had summoned 15 notables for the battle, the 8th notable was the King of Harla and the 9th notable was the King of Hubat. According to best known travel and tourism handbook "Guide to Ethiopia" by author Phillip Briggs and ecologist professor Marco Viganó, the Kundudo (Qundhura) mountain ranges which sits at the mouth of Gursum, Somali (woreda) and easiest to access via Babile was the locality of ancient Hubat, an early Hawiye settlement area pre-dating and surrounding Harar particularly towards the South East and also historically inhabited by nomadic highland Hawiye clans who had turned to farming and cultivation during the rainfall season according to J. Spencer's "Islam in Ethiopia" where they later repelled and neighboured the Oromo Invasions. Many old towns and villages bearing Hawiye ancestral names can still be found in the modern Eastern Hararghe region today.

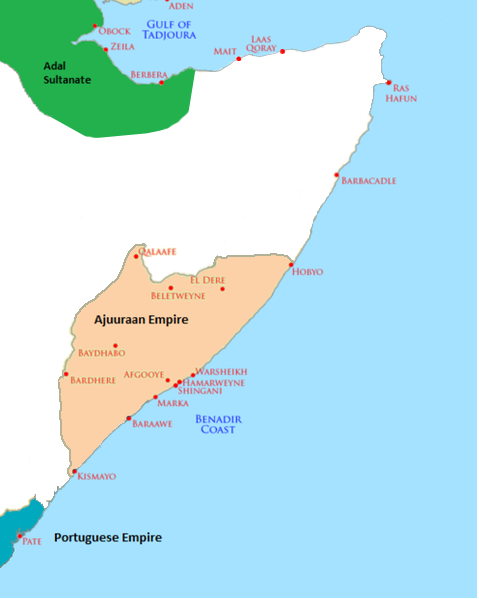
Ajuuraan & Adal map

With Adal Sultanate succeeding Ifat Sultanate, the Hawiye figured prominently as leaders and soldiers in what culminated to become the 16th century conquest of Ethiopia (Futuh al-Habasha). The most famous and widely read Public Historian of Ethiopia, former Minister of Education, Arts & Culture and Dean of the National Library under Haile Selassie, Takla Sadiq Mekuria, author of the "History of Ethiopia; Nubia, Aksum, Zagoe till the Time of the Reign of Aşe Yækunno Amlak", had state devoted the largest study - a 950-page book in 1961 to the life and times of Imam Ahmad ibn Ibrahim al-Ghazi (known as Ahmed Gurey or Mohamed Gragne, the Atilla of Africa and the King of Zeila) as well as the history of the elite core family-unit of the Imam often known as the Malassay Army in his rough monograph on the Gragn Wars called "Ya Gragn Warara" (The Conquests of Gragn), in it he draws on the evidence from Arab Faqih Sihab Uddin and the chronicles of Sarsa-Dengel. Through the mediation of Dagazmac Wargnah he interviewed Ahmed Ali Shami, the most senior authoritative scholar of Harar to have produced the concise manuscript history of Harar (in his Fatah Madinat Harar manuscript) for several European institutions and maintains several preserved Arabic manuscripts, which all provide the only extensive family tree and genealogical known tradition of 8 generations of the father and relatives of Gragne's lineage from the Karanle Hawiye branch with his mother stated to be of the ethnic Harla, who are also in several accounts stated to be an ancient section of the Kerenle. This is also found in the Aussa chronicles and books authored by Manfred Kropp, Layla Sabaq and Berhanu Kamal and others. Gragne's wife was also the daughter of Emir Mahfuz, an important relative, ruler of Zeila and a Balaw, a Karanle subclan also listed as a group of tribes from Bale and a commonly Ethiopian mistranslation of the Coptic Christian synaxarium of Alexandria's "Muslim badawī (bedouin/nomadic descent)" for Muslims in Egypt, Sudan, Somalia and the Red Sea Gulf. See example - Ethiopian chronicles of 10th century Muslim convert Saint George the Egyptian Balaw. Weakened by centuries of northern conflict, a fraction of the Hawiye of the post Adal Harar Emirate continued to remain powerful in the Somali interior and would later form a dynasty of jurists in early modern Zeila.

Since sections of the Hawiyya were migrating southward before and during Gragn's jihad, it is not inconceivable that they brought certain theocratic notions with them. Indeed, the Ajuran maintained a wakil (governor) in the region around Qallafo. This area was not only the traditional Hawiyya homeland, but also stood midway geographically between the emirates of Harar and the Benaadir, an ideal link for the transmission of political and religious ideas.

Enrico Cerulli, an Author on key Somali social development and early history, mentions the following passage on the birth and succession of the Ajuran Sultanate.

The oral sources also provide us with recurrent themes that point to certain structural features of Ajuran rule. The descendants of the Ajuraan (among which are the Gareen imams) can therefore be understood to have inherited the spiritual (Islamic) and the secular (numerical) power provided by the alliance of the first three Hawiyya "brothers". Ajuran power reposed on the twin pillars of spiritual preeminence and Hawiyya kinship solidarity, a potent combination in the Somali cultural context. In historical terms, a theocratic ideology superimposed on an extensive network of Hawiyya-affiliated clans helped uphold Ajuran dominance over a wide region. The Darandoolle, it should be noted, were part of the Gurqaate, a clan section collateral to the Jambelle Hawiyya from whom Ajuran (and Gareen) is said to have been descended. Intermarriage among the descendants of these uterine brothers on the one hand helped reinforce the solidarity of the Hawiyya. On the other hand, competition between collateral lines was very common in Somalia, particularly where the titular leadership of a larger clan-confederation was at stake. Such a struggle for the dominant place within the Hawiyya-dominated Ajuran confederation may also be reflected in the rise of the Silcis and El Amir in the later years of Ajuran rule. Both are said to have been descendants of Gurqaate Hawiyya, as were the Abgaal Darandoolle. Thus it can be argued that the dominant groups which appeared toward the end of the Ajuran era—the Darandoolle near Muqdisho, the Silcis near Afgooye, and the El Amir in Marka—represent the partition of the Ajuran imamate among collateral Hawiyya sections. Or perhaps one branch of the Hawiyya—namely the Gurqaate—forcibly replaced another (the Jambelle) as leaders of the clan.

The Hiraab Imamate was the main successor state of the Ajuran Sultanate. The reason for their rebellion was the Ajuran rulers, in the end, became extremely prideful, neglected the sharia law, and imposed a heavy tax on their subjects which was the main reason for the rebellion. Other groups would follow in the rebellion which would eventually bring down Ajuran rule in the inter-riverine region and Benadir coast.

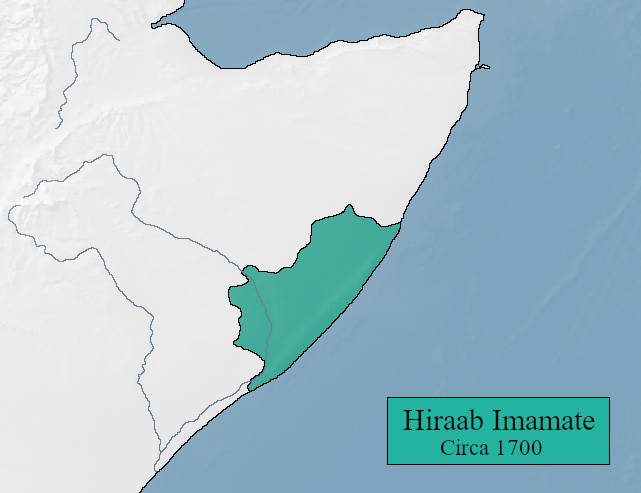
Hiraab Imamate map in 1700

Lee Cassanelli in his book, The Shaping of Somali society, provides a historical picture of the Hiraab Imamate. He writes:

"According to local oral tradition, the Hiraab imamate was a powerful alliance of closely related groups who shared a common lineage under the Gorgaarte clan divisions. It successfully revolted against the Ajuran Empire and established an independent rule for at least two centuries from the seventeen hundreds and onwards.

The alliance involved the army leaders and advisors of the Habar Gidir and Duduble, a Fiqhi/Qadi of Sheekhaal, and the Imam was reserved for the Mudulood branch who is believed to have been the first born. Once established, the Imamate ruled the territories from the Shabeelle valley, the Benaadir provinces, the Mareeg areas all the way to the arid lands of Mudug, whilst the ancient port of Hobyo emerged as the commercial border and Mogadishu being its capital for the newly established Hiraab Imamate in the late 17th century.

Hobyo served as a prosperous commercial centre for the Imamate. The agricultural centres of El Dher and Harardhere included the production of sorghum and beans, supplementing with herds of camels, cattle, goats and sheep. Livestock, hides and skin, whilst the aromatic woods and raisins were the primary exports as rice, other foodstuffs and clothes were imported. Merchants looking for exotic goods came to Hobyo to buy textiles, precious metals and pearls. The commercial goods harvested along the Shabelle river were brought to Hobyo for trade. Also, the increasing importance and rapid settlement of more southerly cities such as Mogadishu further boosted the prosperity of Hobyo, as more and more ships made their way down the Somali coast and stopped in Hobyo to trade and replenish their supplies.

The economy of the Hawiye includes the predominant nomadic pastoralism, and to some extent, cultivation within agricultural settlements in the riverine area, as well as mercantile commerce along the urban coast. At various points throughout history, trade of modern and ancient commodities by the Hawiye through maritime routes included cattle skin, slaves, ivory and ambergris.

Richard Burton, a famous 19th century British explorer said to have been the first European to reach the Holy Islamic sites of Mecca and Medina in secrecy, on visiting the country of the Somalis in 1854 noted among other authors at the time, the northern and southern expansion of the Hiraab prior to the Imamate's deeper conflicts with the advent of Colonialism, said the following:

To the south the Nogal valley touches the Hawiyah, the Marehan and some small neighbouring countries. The Hawiyah are doubtless of ancient origin; they call all Somal except themselves Hashiyah (Aji) and thus claim to be equivalent to the rest of the nation. The antiquity of the Hawiyah is proved by its present widely scattered state; it is a powerful tribe in the Mijjarthayn country and yet it is found in the hills of Harar. It should be noted that the movement towards the South West is faster for the more northerly Hawiyah tribes and therefore further away from the rivers.

Soon afterwards, the entire peninsula was snapped up by Colonial powers and it led to the birth of a Modern Somalia. However, the Hiraab hereditary leadership has remained intact up to this day and enjoys a dominant influence in national Somali affairs.

== Clan tree ==
Due to antiquity and oldened traditions, there are sometimes no clear agreement on the clan and sub-clan structures or many lineages are omitted. Ali Jimale Ahmed outlines his genealogical clan tree of the Hawiye in The Invention of Somalia.

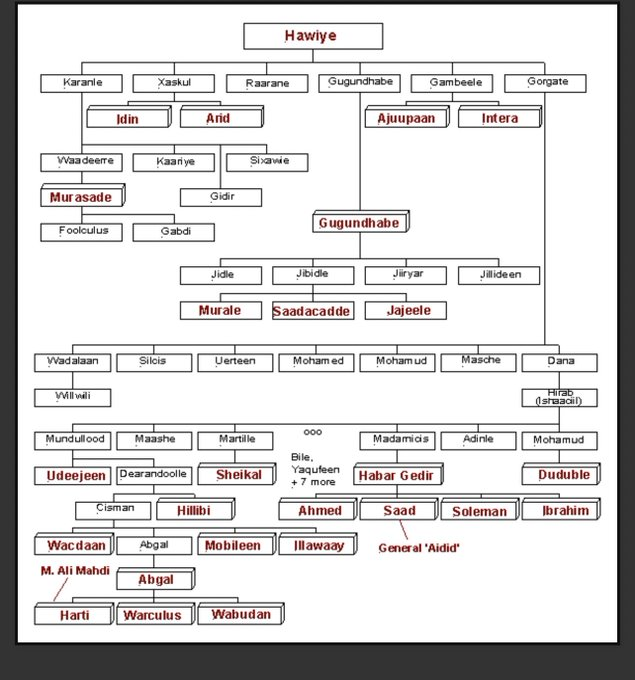
Hawiye clan tree (simple version).

- Samaale
  - Irir
    - Hawiye
      - Karanle
        - Kaariye
        - Gidir
        - Sexawle
          - Baad
        - Murusade
          - Sabti
            - Abakar Sabti
            - Abdalla Sabti
            - Idinle Sabti
            - Ibrahim Sabti
          - Foorculus
            - Habar Ceyno
            - Habar Maxamed
      - Gugundhabe
        - Molkaal (Molcal)
          - Badi Ade
            - Afgaab
            - Maamiye
            - Subeer
          - Baydisle
          - Saransoor
            - Gaaljecel
              - Barsane
              - Sooranle
                - Doqondiide
                - Dirisame
                - Dar-Waaq
                  - Abtisame
                  - Lahube
                    - Aloofi
                    - Makahiil Omar
            - Degoodi
              - Fai
              - Dumaal
            - Ciise
            - Masarre
        - Jidle alias Murule
          - Abdi (Yabarsein)
          - Kuulow
          - Sharmarke
          - Nacabsoor
        - Jijeele
          - Reer Faqay
          - Reer Wabar
      - Gorgaarte
        - Maxamed
        - Hiraab
          - Mudulood
            - Udejeen
              - Kheyre Macalin
              - Adan Yacqub
            - Cabdi Sheikh (Sheekhaal)
            - Darandole
              - Hilibi
                - Cismaan
                  - Wa'daan
                    - Maalinle
                    - Samakaay
                - Moobleen
                  - Magacle
                  - Abidig
                - Ilaaway
                - Abgaal (Cali)
                  - Harti
                    - Warsangeli
                    - Suul Harti
                      - Maxamed Caroone
                        - Agoonyar
                        - Owbakar
                          - Reer Imaam
                        - Yabar Maxamed
                      - Nugaale (Habar Nugaal)
                      - Cabdalla Caroone
            - Ciise Harti
                  - Wa'budhan
                    - Galmaax Yonis
                      - Yusuf Galmaax
                        - Maxamed Muuse
                      - Cumar Galmaax
                        - Celi Cumar
                        - Reer Mataan (Abdulle)
                      - Abdulle Galmaax
              - Xuseen Yonis
                - Sahal Koraaye
              - Adan Yonis
                    - Kabaale Wacbudhan
                      - Saleeban Muse
                      - Xeyle Muse
                    - Dauud
                      - Isaaq Dauud
                      - Yusuf Dauud
                        - Reer Ugaas
                  - Wa'aysle (Warculus)
                    - Saleeban Waceysle
                    - Cumar Saleeban
                      - Dhagaweyne Cumar
                      - Faqay Cumar
                      - Cabdalle Cumar
                        - Cali Gaaf
                        - Absuge
                        - Macalin Dhiblaawe
                    - Abdirahman Saleban
                    - Jibraail Waceysle
                    - Haaruun Waceysle
          - Duduble (Maxamuud Hiraab)
            - Maxamed Camal
            - Maqlisame
            - Owradeen
          - Sheekhaal
            - Loobage
              - Maxamed Cagane
            - Aw-Qudub
          - Habar Gidir
            - Sacad
            - Saleebaan
            - Cayr
            - Saruur
        - Wadalaan
        - Silcis
        - Hawadle
          - Samatalis
            - Dige Samatalis
                - Ciise Dige
                  - Ibrahim Ciise
                  - Madaxweyne Ciise
                    - Ali Madaxweyne
                    - Yabar Madaxweyne
                    - Abdalle Madaxweyne
                      - Agoon Abdalle
                - Yabar Dige
                  - Adan Warsame
            - Cabdalle Samatalis
            - Faramage Samatalis
              - Reer Ugaas
            - Yusuf Samatalis
              - Abdi Yusuf
      - Jambeelle
        - Hintire
        - Ajuran
          - Gareen
          - Waalamage
      - Xaskul
        - Owsaan
      - Raarane Hawiye

NOTE: The Sheekhaal, Xawaadle and Saransoor (Gaaljecel, Dagoodi, Ciise, Masarre, Tuuf Garre) are historically counted as Hawiye lineages under Hiraab, Gorgaarte and Gugundhabe respectively. The Ajuuraan are similarly descendants of Jambeelle.

== Notable Hawiye figures ==
=== Rulers and Nobility ===
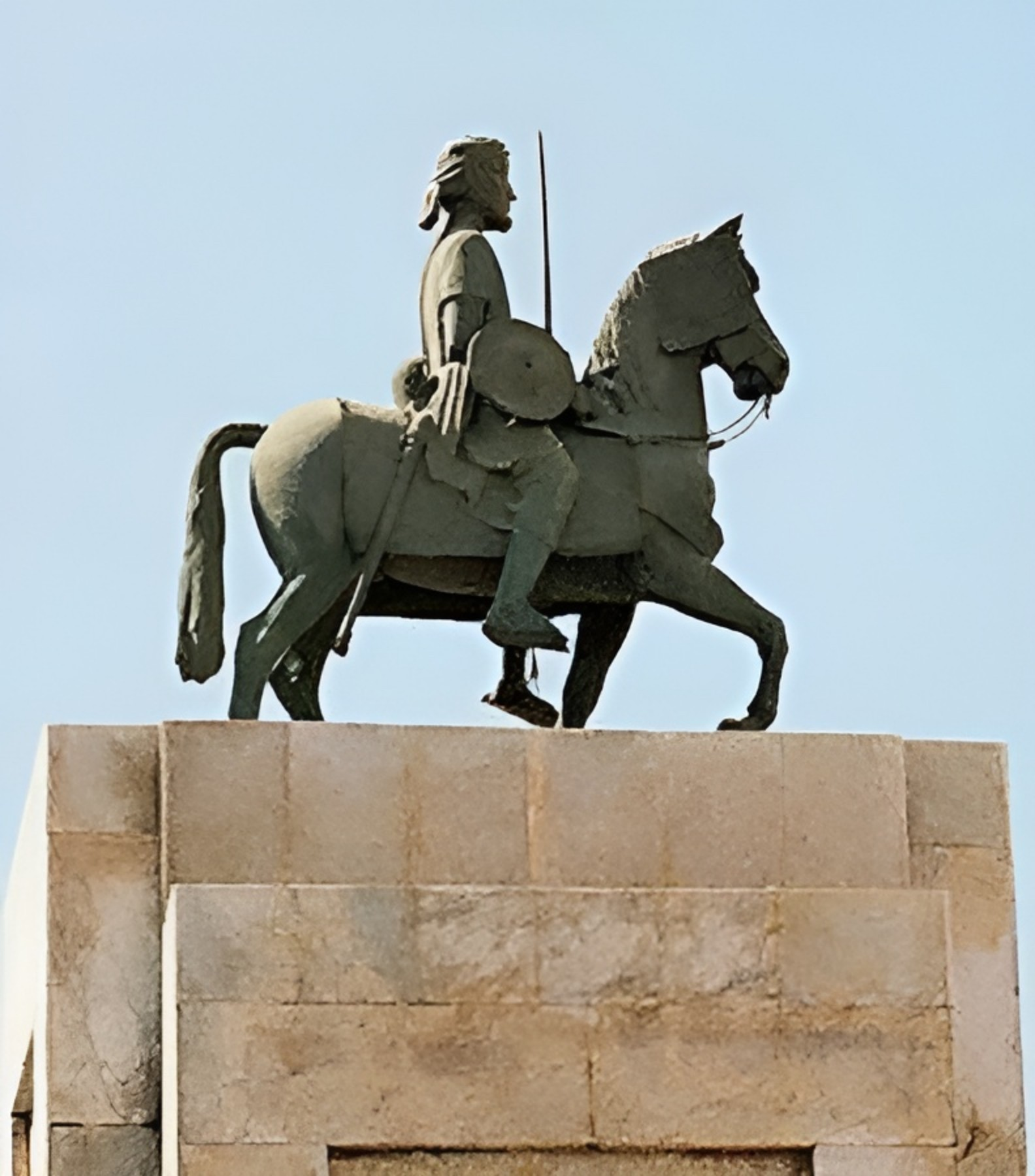
Imam Ahmed Gurey statue in Mogadishu

- Dirre Sheikh Hussein (saint), 11th Century Muslim Saint of East Africa and Ruler of the Sultanate of Bale
- Abadir Umar ar-Rida, Patron Saint and Ruler of Harar
- Garad Abun Adashe, Emir of Adal, Paternal Uncle of Ahmed Gurey
- Ahmad ibn Ibrahim al-Ghazi nicknamed "Ahmed Gurey", Somali Imam, General of the Adal Sultanate and Conqueror of Ethiopia
- Wazir Abbas, Grand Vizier, the Bahr Negash of Adal Sultanate
- Sultan Talha ibn Abbas, succeeding Sultan of Adal
- Muhammad Gasa, First Ruler of the Imamate of Aussa
- Caaqil Dheryodhoobe, Legendary Warrior Chief of Central Somalia and Strategic Thinker
- Mowlana Abd al-Rahman Nurow, Late Renaissance Era Religious Reformist of East Africa
- Malaakh Hassan Geedi Abtow, Traditional leader of Mogadishu
- Sheikh Hassan Barsane, National Anti Colonial leader
- Laashin Ahmed Gabyow, Somali Patriot and Fighter Poet of the Benadir Coast

- Olol Dinle, Last Sultan of the Ajuran Sultanate
- Capo Sandhool Guure, Traditional leader of Hiiraan
- Capo Hersi Gurey, Traditional leader of Mudug
- Nabadoon Mohamed Hassan Xaad, Chairman of Hawiye Elders Council

=== Politicians ===
- Abdullahi Issa, Prime Minister of Somalia, 1956–1960
- Aden Abdullah Osman Daar, President of Somalia, 1960–1967
- Haji Farah Ali Omar, Deputy Prime Minister and Foreign Affairs Minister of Somalia, 1967–1969
- Hussein Kulmiye Afrah, Vice President of Somalia, 1971–1990
- Mohamed Ibrahim Liqliiqato, President of the National Assembly, 1982–1989
- Ali Mahdi Muhammad, President of Somalia, 1991–2000
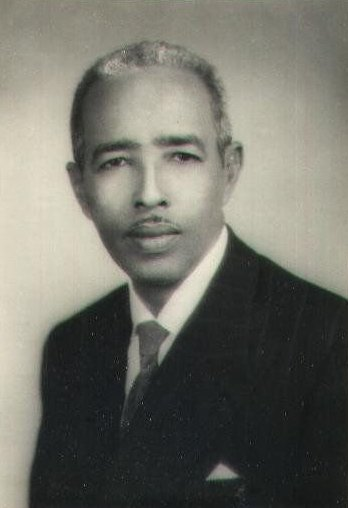
  The first President of Somalia Aden Abdulle Osman Daar
- Abdiqasim Salad Hassan, President of Somalia, 2000–2004
- Ali Mohammed Ghedi, Prime Minister of Somalia, 2004–2007
- Nur Hassan Hussein, Prime Minister of Somalia, 2007–2009
- Sharif Ahmed, President of Somalia, 2009–2012
- Hassan Sheikh Mohamud, President of Somalia, 2012–2017, 2022–Current
- Hassan Ali Khaire, Prime Minister of Somalia, 2017–2020
- Mohamed Hussein Roble, Prime Minister of Somalia, 2020–2022
- Abdulrahman Kinana, First Ever Speaker of the East African Community (EAC) Legislative Assembly, 2001–2006; Former Deputy Minister of Foreign Affairs and Minister of Defence of Tanzania
- Sheikh Ali Jimale, Cabinet Minister, First Opposition Party Secretary-General and Runners Up in the 1961 Presidential Elections
- Hassan Nur Elmi, 1960s Governor of Benadir, Permanent Representative to the United Nations
- Abdirahman Haji Mumin, SYL Party Secretary General, Minister of Defence from 1962 to 1965
- Abdullahi Ahmed Addow, 1963-1970 Governor of the Central Bank, Minister of Economic Affairs, later Somali Ambassador to the United States 1970–1980
- Mohamed Sheikh Osman, 1970s-1980s Former Minister of Finance, Commerce and Industry
- Omar Hassan Mohamud "Istarliin", 1960s Mayor of Mogadishu and Chairman of the Somali Rebellion SODAF
- Ali Mohamed Osoble "Wardhigley", MP Elected from Mogadishu, Minister of Information, Health and Labour, Vice Chairman of SNM, Chairman of USC
- Mohamed Afrah Qanyare, Politician, Businessman, Chairman of the Alliance for the Restoration of Peace and Counter-Terrorism (ARPCT)
- Abukar Umar Adani, Islamist, Tycoon, Owner of the El-Ma`an Port which served as Mogadishu's temporary Port since its closure in 1995
- Abdullahi Mohamed Ali "Sanbaloolshe", Politician, Diplomat, Secretary of State for National Security and Intelligence Chief (NISA)
- Shaaban Ali Issack, Former Member of Kenyan National Assembly/Parliament, Assistant Minister for Urban Development, 1995–2007
- Hassan Mohamed Hussein Mungab, Mayor of Mogadishu, Chief of the Somali Supreme Court, 2012–2016
- Mohamed Nur, Popular Mayor of Mogadishu, 2009–2012, famously nicknamed Tarzan
- Mohamed Hussein Ali, Former Member of Kenyan National Assembly/Parliament, 2007–2013

=== Military personnel ===
- Daud Abdulle Hirsi, First Commander-In-Chief of the Somali National Forces in 1960, Commanding Officer of the 1964 Ethiopian–Somali Border War
- Salaad Gabeyre Kediye, Brigadier General, Father of the 1969 Kacaan Revolution
- General Mohamed Farrah Aidid, Chairman of the United Somali Congress that toppled Dictator Siad Barre, battled US Delta forces and UNOSOM during Operation Restore Hope and a self-declared President of Somalia before his Death, 1987–1996
- General Galal, Frunze Trained Major General, Former Deputy Defence Minister, Chief Architect of the 1964 Ethiopian–Somali Border War and the Ogaden War 1977, Commander of the 1990 Somali Rebellion in Mogadishu, Transitional National Government of Somalia Head of National Commission for Security and Ahlu Sunna Waljama'a Paramilitary Advisor, Four Time War Hero
- Dahir Adan Elmi, Chief of Somali Armed Forces, Major General and the Commander of Qabdri-Daharre Battalion in Somalia-Ethiopian War in 1977 and awarded a Medal of Honour. He is regarded as the longest serving General in the Somali Army
- Mohamud Barre Faytaan, First Chief of the Somali Air Defence Corps and later Somali Airlines
- Mohamed Ali Dhagaxtuur, SYL Horseed Militia leader, Martyr of the 1948 Four-Power Commission Hanoolaato riots in Mogadishu named after the Dhagaxtuur Monument
- Mohamed Abdulle Halane, Posthumous Gold Medallist of the 1964 Ethiopian–Somali Border War commemorated in the Halane Elite Training Camp and Daljirka Dahsoon (Tomb Of The Unknown Soldier Monument)
- Ahmed Sheikh Mao, Cayr, First Commander of the Somali Air Force
- Osman Sheikh Mao, Cayr, First Commander of the Somali Navy
- Colonel Ahmed Maxamed Xasan, Abgaal, Award Winner fighter jet pilot who famously refused government orders to bomb Somaliland in the lead up to the Civil War, 1988–1991
- General Ahmed Jila'ow Adow, former Director of the Somali Secret Services and a Mayor of Mogadishu in 1991
- Abdi Hasan Awale Qeybdiid, Longest reigning Police Commissioner, dubbed Tiger Abdi in the infamous Black Hawk Down
- Mohammed Hussein Ali, Former Commissioner of the Kenya Police.
- Hassan Dahir Aweys, Decorated Colonel of the Ogaden War, Founder of the Islamic Courts Union
- Mohamed Abdi Hassan, Entrepreneur, Somalia's "Pirate Kingpin" who captured the MV Sirius Star Ship, 2008

=== Leading intellectuals ===
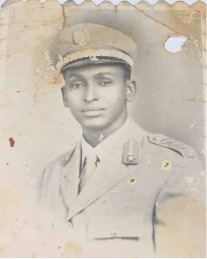
General Salad Gabeyre who organised the 1969 Coup D'état

- Hussein Sheikh Ahmed Kaddare, Linguist, Author of the 1952 Kaddariya script
- Ismail Jim'ale Osoble, Human Rights Lawyer, Journalist, Cabinet Minister, Author of the 1990 Somali Manifesto
- Abdulkadir Yahya Ali, Peace Activist, Founder of the Center for Research and Dialogue
- Elmi Ahmed Duale, Director General of Somali Public Health, World Health Organization East Africa Programme Coordinator, Permanent Representative of Somalia to the United Nations
- Ahmed Mumin Warfa, Senior Government Advisor, Philanthropist, Scientist and Rector of the Zamzam University of Science and Technology, discovered the Cyclamen somalense species
- Farah Weheliye Addo, Politician, Chairman of the Somali Football Association, Council for East and Central Africa Football Associations, Somali Olympic Committee and vice-president of the African Football Confederation (CAF)
- Yusuf Garaad Omar, Editor-in-Chief of the BBC Somali Service
- Abdi Mohamed Ulusso, Writer, Historian, 2004 Presidential Candidate
- Ali Jimale, Educator at the City University of New York
- Ali Sheikh Ahmed, Dual President of Mogadishu University and Al-Islaah
- Elman Ali Ahmed, Entrepreneur and Social Activist
- Hilowle Imam Omar, Chairman of the Somali Civil War Reconciliation Program
- Ibrahim Hassan Addou, Former Professor of Washington University, Foreign Minister of the Islamic Courts Union in 2006
- Hussein Ali Shido, SYL Politician, Ambassador and later founding member of the United Somali Congress
- Hawa Abdi, Haskul subclan, Humanitarian, Physician, Writer, 5 time Award Winner and Nobel Peace Prize Nominee in 2012

=== Music, Literature, Culture and Sports ===
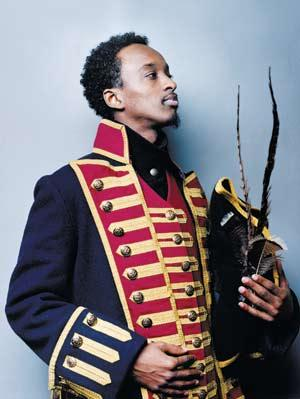
K'naan wins a Grammy Award in 2024, the first of a Somali achievement

- Axyaa Waddani, SYL Poet
- Farah Gololeey, Poet, Political Bard
- Abdi Bashiir Indhobuur, Poet and Composer
- Abdulle Raage Tarawiil, Poet and Actor
- Abshir Bacadle, Poet and Philanthropist
- Abdukadir Osman (Aroma), Story Writer, Historian
- Hasan Adan Samatar, Famous Musician in the 1970s and 1980s
- K'naan, Somali-Canadian Poet, Rapper and Musician
- Magool (Halima Khalif Omar), Musician
- Ali Said Hassan, Somali Film Producer
- Abdullah Noor Wasughe, Somali Olympian
- Ayub Daud, International Footballer, Son of National Somalia Team Captain

== Political factions and organizations ==
- Islamic Courts Union (ICU), an Islamic Revolutionary Group and rival administration to the Transitional Federal Government.
- Alliance for the Restoration of Peace and Counter-Terrorism (ARPCT) a Somali alliance created by various faction leaders and entrepreneurs
- Hizbul Shabaab, the Youth Movement wing of the ICU before ceding the organisation to its first leader Aden Hashi Farah "Eyrow" who hails from the Habar Gidir
- Ahlu Sunna Waljama'a, a rival moderate Sufi paramilitary to Hizbul Shabaab
- Juba Valley Alliance (JVA), primary opponent of the Somali Patriotic Movement
- Somali National Alliance (SNA), formed by Mohamed Farrah Aidid
- Somali Salvation Army (SSA), the Ali Mahdi Muhammad branch of the United Somali Congress
- United Somali Congress (USC), formed in 1987, played a leading role in the ouster of the dictatorship

== See also ==
- Somali aristocratic and court titles
