= Murule =

Somali sub-clan of the Hawiye

Murule مورولا
Murulle (Somali)

Regions with significant populations
- Somalia, Ethiopia, Kenya
- Kenya: 998,821 (2013)
- Ethiopia: 700,000 (2007)
- Somalia: 200,000 (2007)

Languages
- Somali

Religion
- Islam (Sunni)

Related ethnic groups
- Badi Ade, Jijeele, and other Hawiye clans

Murule (Arabic: مورولا) is a sub-clan of the Hawiye and the larger Gugundhabe Hawiye clan. It is one of the major Somali clans and has produced many prominent historical Somali figures.

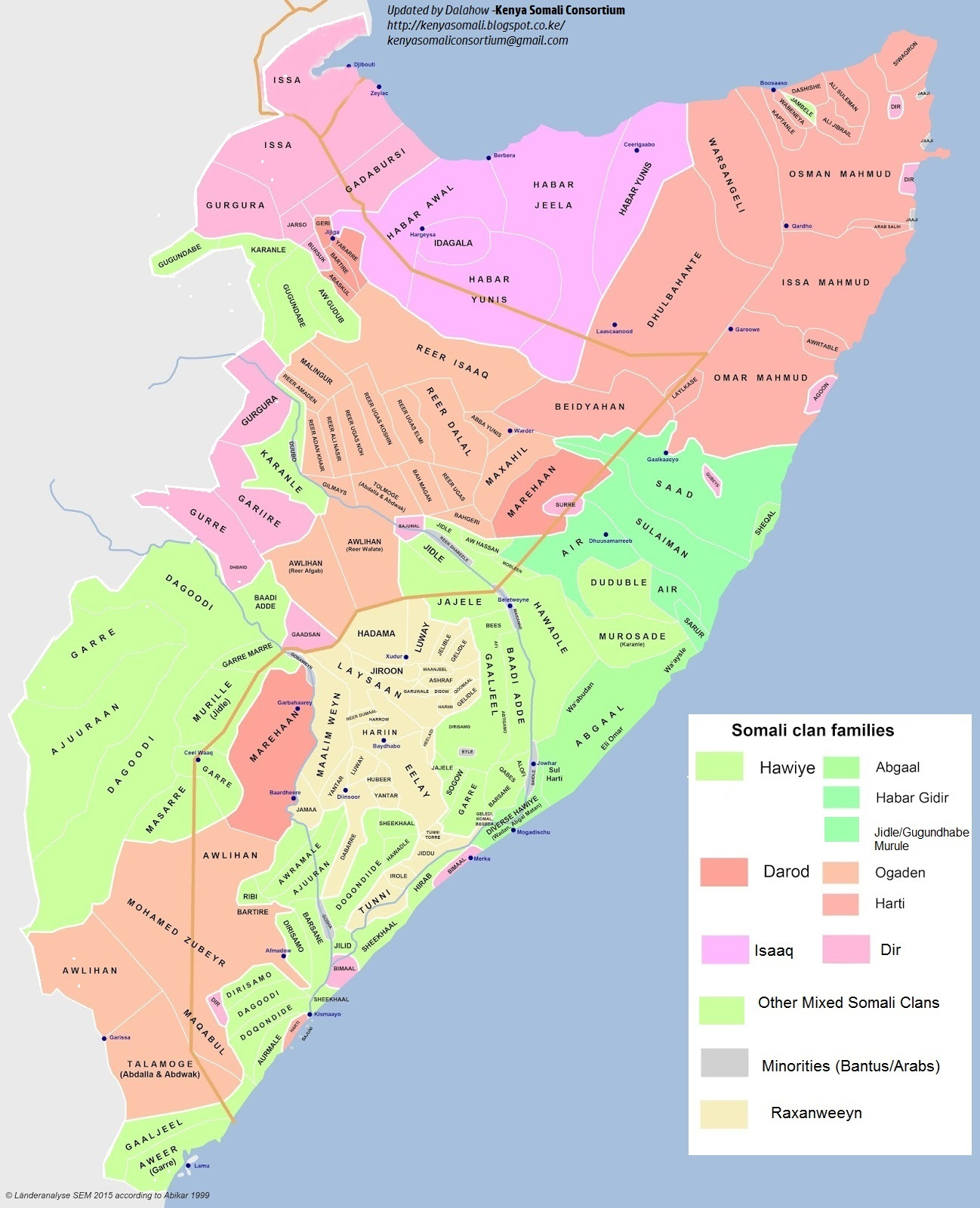
Gugundhabe

== Location ==
The Murule live in many areas amongst Greater Somalia due to migrations. Primarily, they live in the North Eastern part of Kenya in the Mandera, which they traditionally inhabit the sub-counties of Mandera East, Lafey and Arabia in which they are the majority of. Murule also inhabit the neighbouring Ethiopia, in which they live in parts of the directly adjacent districts of Liben zone. They also live in the Mustaaxil zone as part of the wider Jidle community.

In addition to this, the Murule can also be found in the northern part Somali Region. They live in the Erer Zone and traditionally inhabit the Maya-Muluqo where they hold governor and majority of the council positions. They also hold positions in Qubi as well parts of the Lagahida district. Additionally, they can also be found in parts of the Baabili district in Faafan amongst their Hawiye brothers.

Furthermore, they also live in the Sitti zone, where the Reer Fatah and Reer Jama sub-section of the Wacays Abdi Murule inhabit the Mieso district and also hold governor and council positions as well as the Afdem district. They also inhabit the Mieso district on the Oromia side and the town.

Murule also live in parts of Somalia. They live in Buloburde district in Hiran, Beledhawo district in Gedo, and also live in the capital, Mogadishu. A small subsection of a sub-clan of Murule called Reer Jama live amongst the Isaaq in Somaliland, specifically in the city of Wajaale. In addition to this, an expatriate community can be found abroad.

== History ==
The Murule originate from the larger Jidle tribe, which is a sub-clan of the Hawiye clan. Other Jidle clans reside in Somalia, Ethiopia and Somaliland. In 17th century, some Murule clan sections migrated from their abode in the Hiiraan state of Somalia to present-day Mandera County in northeastern Kenya.

When Murule settled in present-day Kenya, in Mandera County, the British Colonial administration made efforts to allocate parts of Mandera to communities. The British consulted Garre Sultan Shaba Aliyow of Garre, who was allocated West of Mandera and Murules east of Mandera. Ugaas Adan Hirsi established peaceful coexistence with other communities such as the Garre on behalf of the British, and the agreements were finalized.

== Clan Tree ==
- Hawiye
  - Gugundhabe Hawiye
    - Jidle
      - Murule Weytan
        - Siidanle
          - Muuge
          - Gafle
        - Garunle
          - Sharmaarke
            - Cigaal Sharmaarke
            - Xalane Sharmarke
            - Ali Sharmarke
          - Yabarseyn
            - Wacays Abdi
            - Reer Faatax
            - Reer Jama
            - Gulled Xirsi
            - Warfaa
          - Kullow

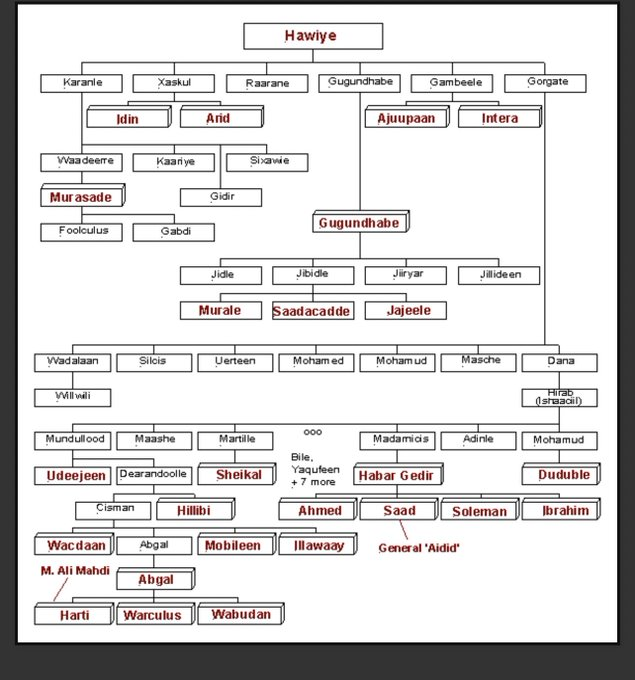
Hawiye clan tree

== Notable people ==
- Mohamud khalif, The Suldan of Murule.
- Late Abdullahi Abajano, Former Mandera East MP
- Omar Mohamed Maalin, Mandera County Speaker.
- Abdi Mude Ibrahim, kenyan politician.
- Adan Nooru, Kenyan politician and former governor of Mandera East.
- Abdulaziz Farah, Kenyan politician.
- Mohamed Hussein Ali, Kenyan politician.
- Shaaban Ali Issack (Mandera East and Lafey constituencies)
- Hussein Weytan (Mandera East Constituency)
- Mohamed Abdikheir (Lafey Constituency)
