= Shaaban Ali Issack =

Kenyan politician (born 1962)

Shaaban Ali Isaack (Somali: Shacbaan Qasai) (born 6 June 1962) is a Kenyan politician. He hails from the Murule Clan of the Jidle Hawiye clan of the Somalis

Hon. Shaaban was a member of the Kenya Parliament representing Mandera East Constituency Township as well as Lafey Constituency of Mandera County. He was elected to the position in a by-election done in 1995 and continued representing Mandera Township until 2007 when another Murule Politician, Mohamed Hussein Qaras took over. Shaaban however moved to the Lafey constituency, where he was nominated by the influential Murule Clan Council of Elders at a meeting in Arabia in Mandera County in 2012. He contested there and became Lafey Constituency Member of Parliament on a URP ticket in the Jubilee Coalition in 2013. URP - United Republican Party was led by Kenya Deputy President William Ruto in a Jubilee Merger with President Uhuru Kenyatta TNA - The National Alliance Party. In 2017, He lost the seat to the Current Lafey MP, Abdi Mude (2017-2022).

Previous Political Positions:

Assistant Minister for Local Government : 2006 → 2007 of Cabinet

Member of Parliament : 2003 → 2007 for Mandera East Constituency, Mandera Township

Member : 1994 → 2007 for Mandera East of Kenya African National Union

Member of Parliament : 1998 → 2002 for Mandera East Constituency, Mandera Township

Member of Parliament : 2013 → 2017 for Lafey Constituency - Mandera County

Committee Memberships: Committee Member, Parliamentary Department of Security and National Administration

Education:

Primary School Student : of Arabia Primary School

Secondary School Student : ('O' Levels) : of Garbatulla Secondary School

Student : (Diploma in Water Supply Technology) : of Kenya Institute of Water, Nairobi

Undergraduate Student : B.A (International Relations) 2005 → 2009 of United States International University.

He is of Somali ethnicity.

Shaaban Ali Isaack career:

Shaaban Ali Isaack worked in Garissa as a District water officer. He was tasked with water supplies in Garissa, the headquarters of North Eastern Province.

From 2002 to 2007 appointed as Kenya's Assistant minister for Local Government by the President Kibaki Government.

From 2003 to 2007 he was a member of departmental Committee on Agriculture, Lands and Natural Resources in the 9th Parliament.

From March 2013 he was a member of the National Assembly representing Lafey Constituency.

Hon. Shaaban Isaack was a Member of Departmental Committee on Administration and National Security since March 2013 - 2017.
