= Abdukadir Osman =

Somali writer

Abdulkadir Osman Mohamud (Aroma) عبد القادر عثمان
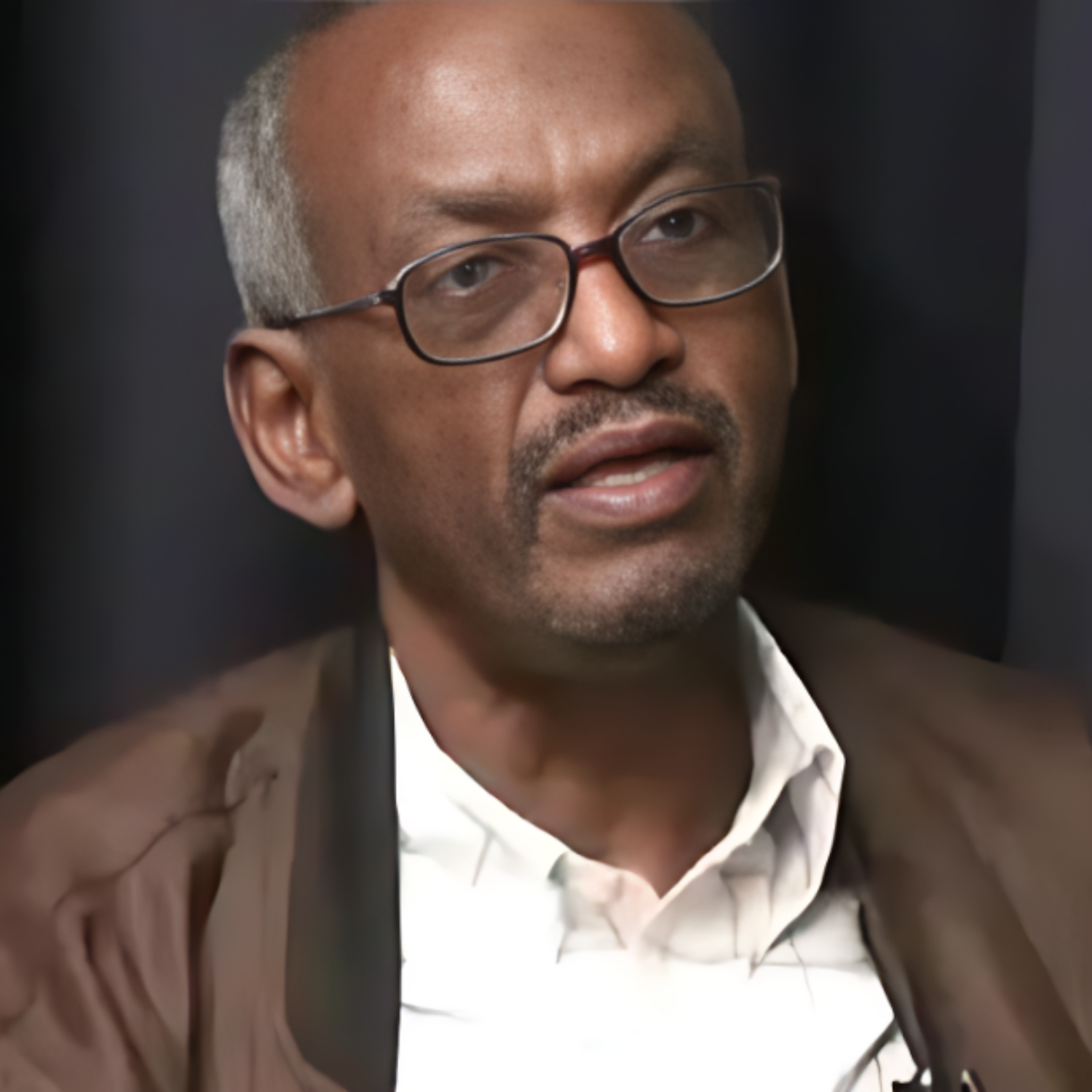
- Abdulkadir Osman Mohamud, a prominent Somali writer, historian and scholar.
- Born: 1953; Dusmo Reeb, Galguduud Somalia
- Died: 15 July 2014 (aged 60–61); London, United Kingdom
- Education: He attended primary and secondary schools in Dusmo reeb and Mogadishu, and later studied at the Somali National University, where he graduated with a degree in history and literature. He also studied Arabic and Islamic studies at various institutions, and learned English, Italian, and French.
- Occupation: Author
- Known for: Aroma
- Notable work: Tiirka Colaadda (2002), Hadimadii Gumeysiga iyo Halgankii Ummadda (2005), Al amru bil macruuf wanahyu canin munkar
- Title: Somali writer, storyteller, historian, poet, cultural expert, scholar, and educator.

Cabdulqaadir Cismaan Maxamuud Aroma (Abdulkadir Osman Mahmuud), (Somali: Cabdulkaadir Cismaan, Arabic: عبد القادر عثمان), also known as Abdulkadir Aroma, was a Somali writer, storyteller, historian, poet, cultural expert, scholar, and educator. He was one of the most influential and respected Somali writers of his generation, and wrote many books and articles on Somali history, politics, and culture, as well as fiction and poetry.

== Early life and education ==
Cabdulqaadir Cismaan Maxamuud was born in 1953 in Dusmareb, a town in the Galguduud region of central Somalia. He came from to the Habar Gidir clan, a sub-clan of the Hawiye. He grew up in a pastoralist and agro-pastoralist community, and witnessed the effects of drought, famine, and conflict on his region. He attended primary and secondary schools in Dusmareb and Mogadishu, and later studied at the Somali National University, where he graduated with a degree in history and literature. He also studied Arabic and Islamic studies at various institutions, and learned English, Italian, and French.

== Career and achievements ==
Cabdulqaadir Cismaan Maxamuud began his career as a teacher and a journalist, working for various newspapers and radio stations in Somalia.

He also pursued his passion for writing, and published many books and articles on Somali history, politics, and culture, as well as fiction and poetry. Some of his notable works include:

- Ilmo Dahabo Toolmoon: A novel about a young girl who escapes from a forced marriage and joins a rebel movement. It was published in 1994 and was well-received by the readers and critics. It was praised for its realistic portrayal of the Somali civil war and its impact on women and children.

- Xaaji Dhagaxkariye: A short story about a man who travels to Mecca for pilgrimage and encounters various challenges and adventures. It was published in 1996 and was based on his own experience of performing the hajj. It was acclaimed for its humor and insight into the Islamic culture and rituals.

- Beesha Toban Kunley: A short story about a clan conflict and its resolution. It was published in the Xog-ogaal newspaper in 1997 and was inspired by a true event that he witnessed in his hometown. It was commended for its message of peace and reconciliation among the Somali clans.

- Sababihii Burburka Soomaaliya (1999): A book that analyzes the causes of the collapse of the Somali state and the civil war. It was one of the first comprehensive and objective studies of the Somali crisis, and offered a historical, political, and social perspective on the root causes and the possible solutions.

- Sooyaalka Soomaaliya (1999): A book that explores the social and cultural aspects of Somali society. It was a collection of essays and articles that he wrote for various publications, and covered topics such as clan identity, gender roles, religion, education, art, and literature.

- Tiirka Colaadda (2002): A book that examines the role of poetry in the Somali conflict and peace process. It was a literary analysis of the poems that were composed and recited by the Somali poets during and after the civil war, and how they reflected and influenced the public opinion and the political agenda.

- Hadimadii Gumeysiga iyo Halgankii Ummadda (2005): A book that documents the history of the Somali resistance against colonialism and the struggle for independence. It was a detailed and well-researched account of the Somali nationalist movement, from the early resistance of the dervishes and the Sayyid, to the formation and the achievements of the SYL, to the declaration and the recognition of the Somali Republic.

- Taangiga Tigreega (2008): A book that criticizes the Ethiopian intervention in Somalia and its consequences. It was a political commentary and a critique of the Ethiopian invasion of Somalia in 2006, and the subsequent occupation and violence that ensued. It was a strong and outspoken voice against the foreign interference and the violation of the Somali sovereignty and dignity.

- Al Amru Bil Macruuf Wanahyu Canin Munkar: A book that he was working on before his death, which contained images and descriptions of various social and cultural issues in Somalia. It was intended to be a visual and verbal representation of the Somali reality, and to raise awareness and promote positive change among the Somali people.

Cabdulqaadir Cismaan Maxamuud was also a teacher and a mentor to many young Somalis, who admired his knowledge and wisdom. He taught at various schools and universities in Somalia and abroad, and gave lectures and seminars on Somali culture and literature.

Throughout his career, he authored publications concerning Somali history and culture. His writings also addressed themes of Somali unity and social issues. His published work includes educational and literary materials read by Somali and international audiences.

== Death and legacy ==
Cabdulqaadir Cismaan Maxamuud died on July 16, 2014, in London, United Kingdom, while undergoing medical treatment. He was 61 years old. He was buried in London. His death was followed by tributes from family members, friends, colleagues, and former students.

His published work includes books, articles, stories, poems, and essays concerning Somali history, politics, and culture, as well as works of fiction and poetry. His work has been discussed in connection with Somali literature and the documentation of Somali cultural heritage.

== See also ==
- Ahmed Sheikh Jama
