= Sandhool Guure =

Hawadle clan leader (1880–1969)

Capo Sandhool Guure (1880–1969) better known as Sandhool Guure was a famous elder and leader of the Hawadle clan.

As the Colonial War grew, with the breakdown of neutral people and no single successor to Italian and British rule emerging, the term "traditional" or "Capo" came into use in Somalia to describe heads of tribal and clan organizations and a complex web of regional and local domination.

Sandhool as the chief of Agoon, became the political chief of the whole clan after Ughaz Warfaa Ugaas Faarax was martyred fighting the Ethiopians in 1897 in Hiiraan, he is also listed as one of the main instigators of the 1915 attack on an Italian Outpost in Bulo Burte. He would soon battle against the Dervishes for the period of one year. To the Agoon tribe belong names such as Sheikh Ali Jimale.

He was arrested by Italian leaders in Barawe in 1916 and was the first leader deported by the Italians to Asmara, Eritrea, for 7 years, until his release in 1923. He died in 1969. After his initial arrest he was replaced by Ugas Mumin Ugaas Warfaa.

Many of his descendants till today play a prominent role in Somalia, particularly in Politics such as Goodax Barre.
