= Gugundabe =

Somali clan family

Gugundabe is a major Somali clan and primary lineage branch of the broader Hawiye clan family
