= Karanle =

Somali Clan Family

بنو كرنلي Karanle
- Hawiye Somali Clan
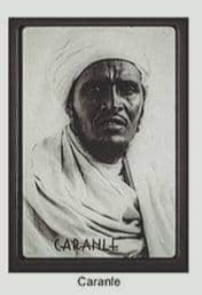
- A Karanle chief in 1930
- Ethnicity: Somali
- Location: (Somalia) Somalia (Ethiopia) Ethiopia; Kenya
- Parent tribe: Hawiye
- Branches: Gidir Karanle; Kaariye Karanle; Sehawle Karanle; Mursal Karanle
- Language: (Somalia) Somali (Arab League) Arabic
- Religion: Sunni Islam

The Karanle (Arabic: كرنلي ,كرن, Somali: Karanle Oromo: Karala/Harala) are a Somali clan, forming one of the six branches of the larger Hawiye clan. The Karanle are geographically spread out across the countries: Somalia Ethiopia, and Kenya. Among all of the Karanle inhabited regions of the Horn of Africa, Ethiopia is where the majority of the clan reside. In Ethiopia, the Karanle are mainly found in Harar/Hararghe, Bale, and Babile but they also inhabit the Somali Region, Dir Dhaba and surrounding regions. The majority of the Karanle sub-clans predominantly reside in the regions of Ethiopia where the Somali population is predominant, with the exception of the Murusade Sub-clan, who reside in central and southern Somalia. Particularly the regions of Galmudug, Banaadir, and Hirshabelle. In Kenya, some members of the Karanle clan are found in Mandera County in the North Eastern Province.

== Overview ==
Karanle, was the first born son of Hawiye, and was born to his first wife Arbera, who is said to be of Arab descent, and thus was tasked with the duty of upholding harmony within the community. The Karanle have been notably involved in the facilitation of peaceful resolutions through mediation. According to historical accounts, they are recognised as the maternal forebears of several prominent clans, such as the Hiraab, the Bimaal, and other subclans of the Ogaden clan. For their age in antiquity and relations with many clans, the Garads and Ughaz of Karanle have often participated in coronations of new traditional leadership in many parts of the countries.

First mentioned in the 13th and 14th centuries by Abu Al Fida and Ibn Said, the Karanle were mentioned living in eastern Ethiopia and involved in the mining and industry of Gold and Silver.

The Karanle are credited for fighting foreign invaders in Somalia and Ethiopia where they historically shared a long border. Karanle's tomb can be found in Qundhuro, situated within the Haraghe region alongside his father, Shiekh Ahmed Hawiye's tomb.

The Karanle (Kerenle) historical polity is known in older accounts as the Harla Kingdom. An index of Harla subclans in the Futuh Al Habesha are identified as Karanle subclans such as Ciye (Al Qiy), Shurbul (Zurba) and Tacale Gidr (Tal Ali) etc led by Sultan Muhammad Gasa Omar, the cousin of Ahmed Gurey, who are both Karanle. According to some sources, the Karrayyu (an Oromo tribe which count several Hawiye assimilated groups) are regarded as Oromos with Harla descent.

He also claims Hawasso (Hawiye Casse of the riverine) was the Oromo name for the Harla (Karanle) people. In reality, Hawasso was the name of an Oromo clan that lived around the middle section of the Awash River, which the Oromo call Hawash, and thus they received the nickname Hawasso; they belonged to the Karrayyu (Karanle) confederacy.

The Karanle of Somalia and Ethiopia are also closely linked with several ancient historical capitals such as Harar and Mogadishu, setting up foundational quarters of the towns such as Harar's Erer Gate of the Reer Erer Nur of the Gidir clan family which houses the tomb of Nur Mujahid and the Jami Mosque, the oldest in town. The section of burials in Harar is placed where their descendants are found, hence the eastern sections of Harar, settled by Hawiye native subclans, houses many Muslim saints of the clan such as Nur Mujahid and the descendants of Sheikh Nur Hussein of Bale. Similar infrastructure include the Gidir Magala marketplace of Harar and the Murursade Gate of South Mogadishu.

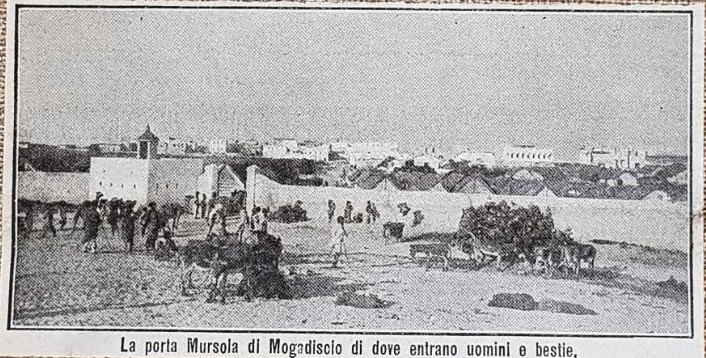
The Murusade gate of the old city of Mogadishu

The Sheikh Basikh (or Raoûf) Mosque, once the largest in town, was a political centre for Karanle figures before its conversion to the Medhane Alem church in 1890 at the hands of Menelik after the Battle of Chelenqo.

== History ==
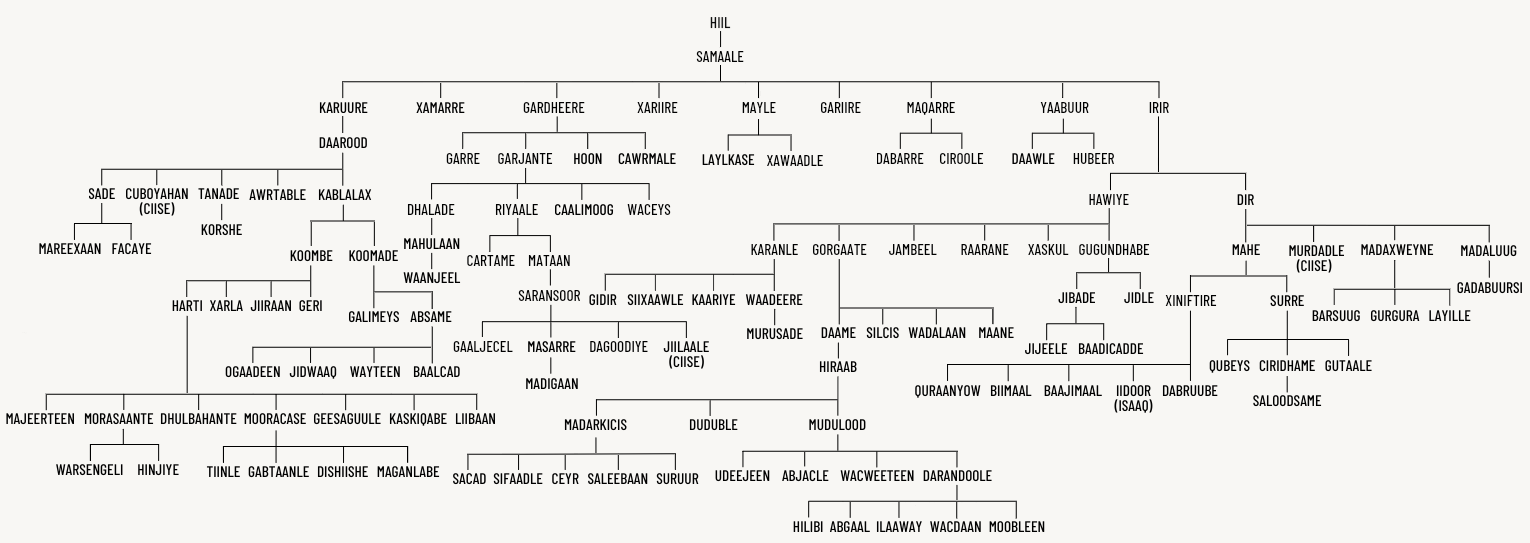
Genealogical tree of Somali clans

=== Imam Ahmad Ibn Ibrahim Al Ghazi, and Barr Sa’ad Al din ===
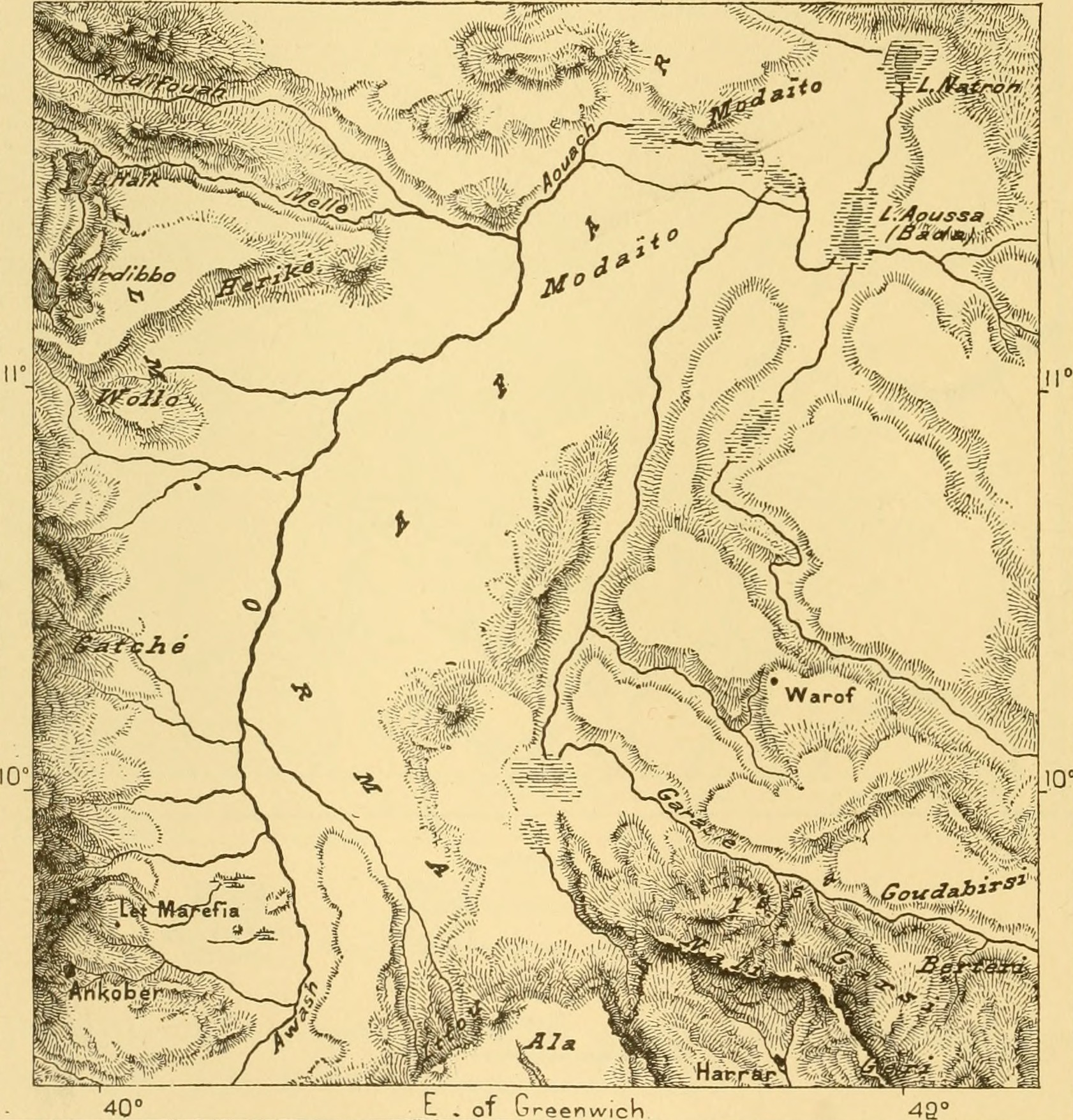
An old map of Harar, the traditional homeland of the Karanle (Spelled here as Garanle)

With the Adal Sultanate succeeding Ifat Sultanate, the Karanle figured prominently as leaders and soldiers in what culminated to become the 16th century conquest of Ethiopia (Futuh Al-Habasha).

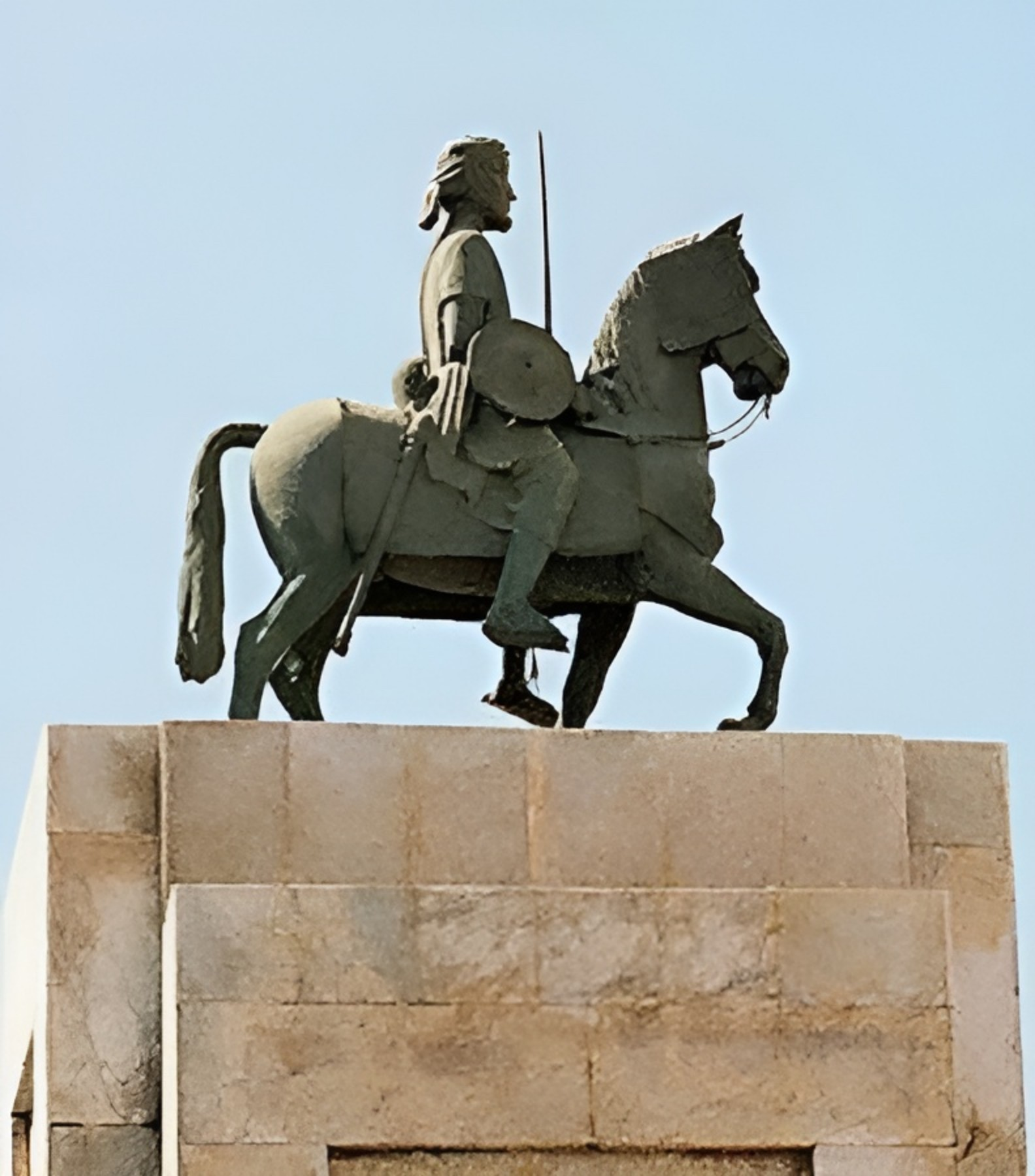
Ahmed Gurey Statue in Mogadishu Somalia

The most famous and widely read Public Historian of Ethiopia, former Minister of Education, Arts & Culture and Dean of the National Library under Haile Selassie, Takla Sadiq Mekuria, author of the "History of Ethiopia; Nubia, Aksum, Zagoe till the Time of the Reign of Aşe Yækunno Amlak", had state devoted the largest study - a 950-page book in 1961 to the life and times of Imam Ahmad ibn Ibrahim al-Ghazi (known as Ahmed Gurey or Mohamed Gragne, the Atilla of Africa and the King of Zeila) as well as the history of the elite core family-unit of the Malassay Army in his rough monograph on the Gragn Wars called "Ya Gragn Warara" (The Conquests of Gragn), in it he draws on the evidence from Arab Faqih Sihab Uddin and the chronicles of Sarsa-Dengel. Through the mediation of Dagazmac Wargnah he interviewed Ahmed Ali Shami, the most senior authoritative scholar of Harar to have produced the concise manuscript history of Harar (in his Fatah Madinat Harar manuscript) for several European institutions and maintains several preserved Arabic manuscripts, which all provide the only extensive family tree and genealogical known tradition of 8 generations of the father and relatives of Gragne's lineage from the Karanle Hawiye branch with his mother stated to be of the Somali clan Harla. This is also found in the Aussa chronicles and books authored by Manfred Kropp, Layla Sabaq and Berhanu Kamal and others. Gragne's wife was also the daughter of Emir Mahfuz, an important relative, ruler of Zeila and a Balaw, a Karanle subclan also listed as a group of tribes from Bale and a commonly Ethiopian mistranslation of the Coptic Christian synaxarium of Alexandria's "muslim badawī (bedouin/nomadic descent)" for Muslims in Egypt, Sudan, Somalia and the Red Sea Gulf. See example - Ethiopian chronicles of 10th century Muslim convert Saint George the Egyptian Balaw. Imam Ahmad Ibn Ibrahim Al Ghazi was a Karanle, specifically the Balaw subclan of the Sehawle Karanle. Weakened by centuries of northern conflict, the Karanle of the post Adal Harar Emirate continued to remain powerful in the Somali interior and would later form a dynasty of jurists in early modern Zeila.

=== Sultanate of Bale ===
The Sultanate of Bale emerged sometime between the 11th and 13th centuries, within the Bale region. Shaped by Islamic influences introduced by traders and preachers, and a close ally if not a brother state to the Ajuran Sultanate. Many clans lived in early Bale including the Karanle. Islam provided the rulers with a framework for governing larger and more complex political entities by fostering ideological unity and granting access to international Islamic thought, which helped them rise above narrow, local loyalties. Additionally, Islam served as a form of international "passport," enabling traders, teachers, and preachers to live and travel freely throughout these states, from the port of Zeila on the northern Somali coast to Bale in the fertile highlands of southern Ethiopia.

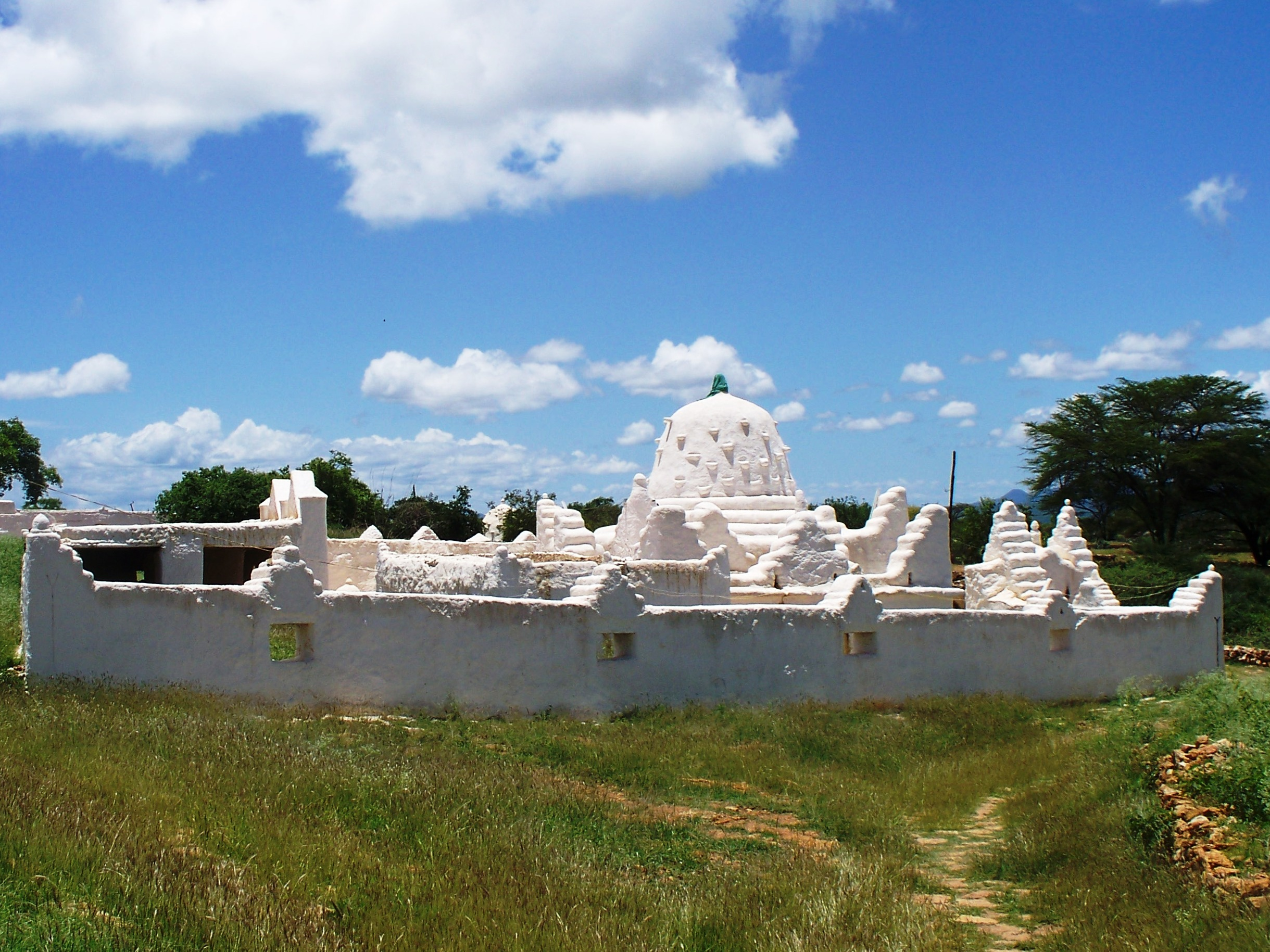
Shrine and tomb of Sheikh Hussein in Bale

The history of the Muslim state of Bale is closely tied to the legacy of Sheikh Hussein, a Somali scholar from Merca belonging to the Hawiye and a prominent standard-bearer of Islam in Bale during the 11th century. Sheikh Hussein played a pivotal role in spreading Islam across the region. Revered as the most accomplished missionary saint in southern Ethiopia, he became the ultimate symbol of saintly virtues and baraka (spiritual blessing). Since the 13th century, his shrine in Bale has been a center for the diffusion of Islam and a rallying point for Muslims throughout southern Ethiopia.

According to al-Umari, Bale was among the largest of Ethiopia's Muslim provinces, spanning roughly twenty days journey by six—approximately 400 kilometers by 120 kilometers. Nestled in the southern highlands, Bale experienced higher rainfall and a cooler, more fertile climate than its neighboring territories. Despite this, its agricultural production, food, clothing, and social customs were similar to those of nearby Muslim lands. Due to its remote southern location, Bale's trade was less developed than that of neighboring regions. Coins were not in circulation as they were in Ifat, nor was hakuna used as in lands to the north. As a result, trade primarily relied on barter, with cattle, sheep, and cloth being the main goods exchanged. However, Bale appears to be famous for its cotton-cloth-weaving industry, and its foreign traders, which primarily included Arabs and Persians. Unlike nearby Muslim provinces, Bale's leadership was not held by a hereditary dynasty but rather by a man of humble origins—possibly the aforementioned 'Ali—who had gained the favor of 'Amda Seyon and received official investiture as ruler. The province’s military force included eighteen thousand cavalry and numerous infantry soldiers.

== Branches ==
The Karanle are divided into four subclans:

- Karanle
  - Gidir Karanle
    - Aw Bakr
      - Ahmed Maqi
    - Warneif
      - Taa'uud
      - Faasi
        - Aw Qariib
    - Abshale
  - Kaariye Karanle
    - Af Haaj
    - Laasuge
      - Abu Bakr
        - Sa'ad ad-diin Abu bakr
        - Muhammed Abu bakr
          - Sultan Muhammed
  - Mursal Karanle
    - Sabti
      - Abu Bakr Sabti
      - Idinle Sabti
      - Abdalla Sabti
      - Ibrahim Sabti
    - Foorculus
      - Muhammed Foorculus/ Hilibi
      - Ahmed Foorculus/ Daguuro
      - Ebakar Foorculus Hawar Ceene.
  - Sexawle Karanle
    - Balaw
      - Iye
        - Reer Garaad Mahiiqe
      - Shurbul
    - Ba'ad
    - Bur'aal
      - Bade Samatar
        - Arabi
        - Haro
      - Farah Samatar

== Notable members ==
- Ahmad ibn Ibrahim al-Ghazi, Somali Imam and General of the Adal Sultanate, Ruler of Harar and Conqueror of Ethiopia
- Muhammad Gasa, Somali Imam and Founder of the Imamate of Aussa who fought off the Oromo Invasion and nephew of Gragn
- Hassan Ali Khaire, Prime Minister of Somalia, 2017–2020
- Abdulkadir Yahya Ali, Peace Activist, Founder of the Center for Research and Dialogue
- Mohammed Sheikh Osman, Member of the 25 seat revoloutionary council, the executive body of the Somali Democratic Republic, and Finance minister.
- Ali Mohamed Osoble "Wardhigley", MP Elected from Mogadishu, Minister of Information, Health and Labour, Vice Chairman of SNM, Chairman of USC
- Mohamed Afrah Qanyare, Politician, Businessman, Chairman of the Alliance for the Restoration of Peace and Counter-Terrorism (ARPCT)
- Hassan Moalim, Minister, Power Broker, Chairman of Daljir Party
