= Raarane =

Rarane is one of the six branches branches of Hawiye clan-family..
