= Gurgarte =

Somali clan family

Gurgarte, or Gorgarte, is one of six principal branches, traditionally identified in Hawiye genealogical traditions.
