= Ahmed Mohamed Hassan (pilot) =

Somali former Air Force pilot (born 1953)

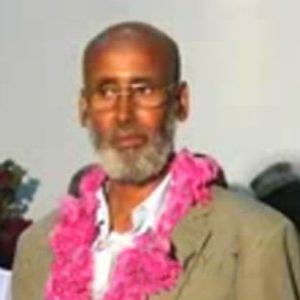
- Born: 1 April 1953 (age 73); Mogadishu, Trust Territory of Somaliland (now Somalia)
- Other name: Ahmed Dheere (nickname)
- Occupation: Former fighter pilot

Ahmed Mohamed Hassan (Somali: Axmed Maxamed Xasan, Arabic: أحمد محمد حسن; born April 1, 1953) is a Somali former Air Force pilot known for refusing to follow his orders to bomb the city of Hargeisa, Somalia's second capital, during the dictatorial rule of Mohamed Siad Barre.

He was born in central Shabelle, especially in Biyacade District, which is about 45 km from Jowhar.

His father was a funeral director in Biyacade district. He was called the father of nabadon Haji Muhumahad Hassan. He is from the Goonyar tribe. (Agoonyar gaabane)

== Early life and background ==
Mohamed Hassan was born on April 1, 1953, in Mogadishu during its period as a United Nations Trust Territory. He had a modest upbringing and was raised by his parents alongside his ten siblings. He hails from the Abgaal Hawiye clan.

He joined the Somali Air Force in the early 1970s, where he quickly made a name for himself as an exceptional and talented young pilot. He eventually attained the rank of lieutenant colonel (Gashaanle Dhexe).

== Somali Civil War ==
On July 12, 1988, during the early months of the Somali Civil War, he received orders to bomb Hargeisa, then the second-largest city in the former Somali Democratic Republic military dictatorship. As an officer in the Somali Air Force, he took an oath to defend his nation and its people and could not bring himself to bomb and kill innocent civilians.

He refused to obey his orders and switched off his radio. He flew his Mig-17 fighter aircraft to the nearby country of Djibouti, where he was forced to make an emergency landing on a beach due to fuel shortage. He abandoned his jet and attempted to make his way to the capital by walking in the scorching heat. After walking some distance, he came across some fishermen near the coast who helped him reach the capital.

The Somali government requested his repatriation; however, the Djibouti government refused and he was informed by the Djibouti Home Affairs Minister that due to his actions, he will be granted political asylum.

== Later life ==
Mohamed Hassan moved to Europe in 1990, where he settled in Luxembourg with his wife and children. In 2008 he returned to Hargeisa, where he was invited to attend a ceremony held to honour his exceptional heroism, integrity and nobility. He was the guest of honour at that year's 26 June celebrations.

A humble man, he mentioned in a 2009 interview with BBC Somali that it was his duty as a human being to save the lives of defenceless and innocent people, adding that he refused to be a vessel for destruction and that it is only other people who make his actions seem heroic.
