= Abu Bakr Sabti =

Somali sub-clan belonging to the Murusade clan

Abakar Sabti ابو بكر السبتي
- Hawiye Somali Clan
- Ethnicity: (Somalia) Somali
- Location: Somalia
- Descended from: Ahmed Bin Abdulrahman Bin Uthman
- Parent tribe: Sabti
- Branches: Israfiil: Hasanle; Dhaleey; Gabood; Codweyn: Mahmoud; Hussein; Sa'ed: Abdirahmaan Sa'ed; Adan Sa'ed; Tuurweyne Sa'ed
- Language: (Somalia) Somali (Arab League) Arabic
- Religion: Sunni Islam

Abu Bakr Sabti (Somali: Abakar Sabti, also spelled Abakar Sabdi; Arabic: ابو بكر السبتي) are a Somali clan belonging to the larger Sabti sub-clan of the Murusade, which itself belongs to the larger Karanle branch of the Hawiye clan. Its members live in Banaadir, Mudug, Galgaduud and Lower Shebelle.

The Abu Bakr Sabti traditionally consists of nomadic pastoralists, coastal people, merchants and farmers. They primarily inhabit the central regions of Somalia, specifically in the Mudug and Galguduud regions, particularly concentrated in the El-Buur District. The clan is considered to be both economically and politically affluent.

== Clan tree ==
Murusade branches including the Abakar Sabti

The Abakar Sabti are subdivided among Abu Bakr's Three children. The following is a full genealogical list starting with Samaale, the forefather of the Somali clans; some names are, however, omitted.

Samaale
  - Irir
    - Hawiye (Sheikh Ahmed)
      - Karanle
        - Gidir Karanle
        - Sexawle Karanle
        - Karaiye Karanle
        - Mursal Karanle (Murusade)
          - Khalibar
            - Wacayle
              - Makahan
                - Garfuul
                  - Himyar
                    - Haylah
                      - Warwaaq
                        - Jiilaal
                          - Wacsalah
                            - Sabti
                              - Abu Bakr Sabti
                                - Israfiil Abakar
                                  - Hasanle
                                    - Mohammed Mahmuud
                                    - Carif Mahmuud
                                    - Omar Mahmuud
                                    - Siicow Mahamuud
                                  - Gabood
                                    - Abu Bakar Wasuge
                                      - Mahamuud Abakar
                                      - Ahmed Gaab
                                      - Jim'ale
                                    - Mahamuud Wasuge
                                    - Mataan Wasuge
                                    - Gurey
                                      - Hassan Gurey
                                  - Dhaleey
                                    - Adam Cigalle
                                    - Mahmuud Wehiliye
                                    - Ali Abdalle Dhaleey
                                - Codweyne Abakar
                                  - Hussein Coodweyne
                                    - Dhilaay (Muuse)
                                    - Muusetuur (Axmed)
                                    - Najac Kaboole
                                      - Mahamuud
                                      - Ali
                                    - Mohammed Hassan
                                  - Mahamuud
                                    - Hashane
                                      - Mohammed Cigalle (Dhagaweyne)
                                        - Osman
                                        - Jibriil
                                        - Mahamuud
                                        - Ahmed
                                        - Ali
                                        - Omar
                                        - Amanle
                                        - Saldhale
                                        - Jim'ale
                                      - Adam Cigalle
                                      - Amaanle
                                    - Ibrahim
                                      - Gondaale
                                      - Dirir
                                - Saeed
                                  - Tuurweyne Sa'ed
                                  - Abdirahmaan Sa'ed
                                  - Aadan Sa'ed
                                  - Rooble Sa'ed
