= Sabti =

Sabti بنو سبتي
- Hawiye Somali Clan
- Nisba: Al-Sabti
- Descended from: Sheikh Ahmed Bin Abdulrahman Bin Uthman
- Parent tribe: Murusade
- Branches: Abu Bakr Sabti; Abdalla Sabti; Idinle Sabti; Ibrahim Sabti
- Language: (Somalia) Somali (Arab League) Arabic
- Religion: Sunni Islam

The Sabti (Arabic: بنو سبتي ) are a Somali clan belonging to the larger Murusade clan, which itself belongs to the larger Karanle branch of the Hawiye clan. The clan is reputed for having a lengthy and flourishing mercantile history that dates back through history. The Sabti primarily reside in the central regions of Somalia, in Galgaduud and Mudug, as well as Banaadir and the Lower Shabelle in southern Somalia.

The Sabti's original homeland was in northern Somalia, but a section of the clan migrated south around the 13th century and settled along the Banadir coast up to the Shebelle River.The Sabti traditionally consist of nomadic pastoralists, coastal people, merchants and farmers.

== Branches ==
Murusade branches including the Sabti

The Sabti are subdivided among Sabti's three children. The following is a full genealogical list starting with Samaale, the forefather of the Somali clans; some names are, however, omitted.

Samaale
  - Irir
    - Hawiye (Sheikh Ahmed)
      - Karanle
        - Gidir Karanle
        - Sexawle Karanle
        - Karaiye Karanle
        - Mursal Karanle (Murusade)
          - Khalibar
            - Wacayle
              - Makahan
                - Garfuul
                  - Himyar
                    - Haylah
                      - Warwaaq
                        - Jiilaal
                          - Wacsalah
                            - Sabti
                              - Majabe Sabti
                                - Abu Bakr
                                  - Israfiil Abakar
                                    - Hasanle
                                      - Mohammed Mahmuud
                                      - Carif Mahmuud
                                      - Omar Mahmuud
                                      - Siicow Mahamuud
                                    - Gabood
                                      - Abu Bakar Wasuge
                                        - Mahamuud Abakar
                                        - Ahmed Gaab
                                        - Jim'ale
                                      - Mahamuud Wasuge
                                      - Mataan Wasuge
                                      - Gurey
                                        - Hassan Gurey
                                    - Dhaleey
                                      - Adam Cigalle
                                      - Mahmuud Wehiliye
                                      - Ali Abdalle Dhaleey
                                  - Codweyne Abakar
                                    - Hussein Coodweyne
                                      - Dhilaay (Muuse)
                                      - Muusetuur (Axmed)
                                      - Najac Kaboole
                                        - Mahamuud
                                        - Ali
                                      - Mohammed Hassan
                                    - Mahamuud
                                      - Hashane
                                        - Mohammed Cigalle (Dhagaweyne)
                                          - Osman
                                          - Jibriil
                                          - Mahamuud
                                          - Ahmed
                                          - Ali
                                          - Omar
                                          - Amanle
                                          - Saldhale
                                          - Jim'ale
                                        - Adam Cigalle
                                        - Amaanle
                                      - Ibrahim
                                        - Gondaale
                                        - Dirir
                                  - Saeed
                                    - Tuurweyne Saeed
                                    - Abdirahmaan Saeed
                                    - Aadan Saeed
                                    - Rooble Saeed
                                - Habar Idinle
                                  - Ayansame
                                    - Hassan
                                      - Dumaal
                                        - Muhammad Ali
                                        - Ahmed Ibrahim
                                    - Hussein
                                      - Hassan Gadaf
                                        - Adan Sultan
                                          - Abdullahi Adan Sultan
                                          - Cadow Adan
                                          - Musa Adan
                                  - Gumacade
                              - Ibrahim Sabti
                              - Abdalla Sabti
                                - Absuge
                                  - Mohammed Yar
                                    - Adan gaab
                                    - Hassan caad
                                    - Abu-bakr Mohammed
                                  - Mahamuud Faqaay
                                    - Ahmed Musa
                                    - Osman Musa
                                      - Isse Osman
                                      - Roble Osman
                                    - Ali Musa
                                    - Hagaleey
                                - Ilkaguduud
                                  - Hassan
                                  - Caraale
                                  - Hareed
