= Mandera East Constituency =

Kenyan electoral constituency

Mandera East
- constituency for the Parliament of Kenya
- Mandera East Constituency within Mandera County

- Mandera County within Kenya
- County: Mandera
- Population: 159,638
- Area: 2,506 km^{2} (967.6 sq mi)

Current constituency
- Number of members: 1
- Party: ODM
- Member of Parliament: Husseinweytan Mohamed Abdirahman
- Wards: 5

Mandera East Constituency is an electoral constituency in Kenya. It is one of six constituencies in Mandera County. The constituency was established for the 1966 elections. The constituency is settled largely by the Garre and Murulle community.

== Members of Parliament ==
Elections	MP	Party	Clan
1966	Sayid Mohamed Amin	KANU	Gare
1969	Sayid Mohamed Amin	KANU	Gare
1974	Mohamed Sheikh Aden	KANU	Murulle
1979	Mohamed Sheikh Aden	KANU	Murulle
1983	Adan Mohamed Nooru	KANU	Gare.
1988	Mohamed Sheikh Aden	KANU	Murulle
1992	Abdullahi Sheikh Ahmed	PICK	Murulle
1994	Isaack Ali Shaaban	KANU	Murulle
1997	Isaack Ali Shaaban	KANU	Murulle
2002	Isaack Ali Shaaban	KANU	Murulle
2007	Mohamed Hussein Ali	ODM	Murulle
2013	Abdulaziz Farah	URP	Murulle
2017	Omar Mohamed - (Omar Sala	EFP	Murulle
2022	Hussein Weytan Mohumed Abdirahman	ODM	Murulle

== Wards ==
Wards
Ward	Registered Voters	Local Authority
Barwako	1,045	Mandera town
Border Point One	1,224	Mandera town
Bula Mpya	3,005	Mandera town
Bulla Jamhuria	4,106	Mandera town
Neboi	750	Mandera town
Shaf Shafey	1,163	Mandera town
Township Kamoro	3,372	Mandera town
Alango Gof	1,162	Mandera county
Arabia	1,646	Mandera county
Bur Abor / Bula Haji	1,092	Mandera county
Fino	1796	Mandera county
Hareri	1,770	Mandera county
Kalaliyo East	1,962	Mandera county
Kalaliyo West	2,319	Mandera county
Lafey	2,348	Mandera county
Libehia	1,567	Mandera county
Waranqara	1,739	Mandera county
Total	31,079	
*September 2005.
