= Hussein Shido =

Somali politician

Hussein Ali Shido (Somali: Xuseen Cali Shido; born 1926) is a Somali politician. He entered politics when he joined the Somali Youth League. Dr. Hussein was one of the founders of the United Somali Congress, and later became its chairman prior to General Mohamed Farrah Aidid holding the position. He was born in Hobyo, Italian Somaliland (now Somalia).
