= Omar Hassan Mohamud Istarliin =

Somali politician

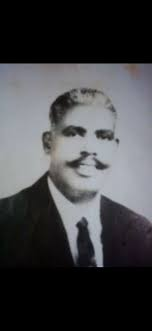
former Mayor of Mogadishu - Omar Hassan Mohamud Istarliin

Omar Hassan Mohamud Istarliin (Somali: Cumar Xasan Maxamuud "Istarliin", Arabic: عمر حسن إسترلين) was a Somali Mayor of Mogadishu in the government of Aden Abdullah Osman Daar shortly before the military coup d'état of 1969. Following those events, he went into exile to form the first anti-revolutionary front SODAF as its first chairman or President. He was also one of the signers of the Somali Manifesto.
