= Hassan Nur Elmi =

Somalian politician

Hassan Nur Elmi (Somali: Xassan Nuur Cilmi) was a prominent Somali politician, diplomat, and Member of Parliament in the civilian government. He hailed from the Sheikhal Loboge clan.

As the Governor of the Benadir Region in 1960, he later held numerous ministerial positions in the civilian regime, including the position of Ambassador and Permanent Representative to the United Nations, which he held from 1960 to 1967.

His brother, Hussein Nur Elmi was formally the Governor of Hiran Region.
