= Somali Democratic Action Front =

- Leaders: Omar Hassan Mohamud 'Istarliin'; Ismaan Nur Qonof
- Founded: 1974
- Dates active: June 1976 – 1981
- Merged into: SSDF
- Allegiance: (Somali Republic) Somalia
- Headquarters: Rome
- Active regions: Israel ( Training ) (Ethiopian Empire) Ethiopia
- Wars: Somali Civil War

The Somali Democratic Action Front (SODAF; Somali: Ururka Dhaqdhaqaaqa Dimuqraadiyada Soomaaliyeed) was the first rebel group of the Somali Rebellion. It was trained by Israel and backed by Ethiopia. In early 1970s its members received training in Tel Aviv. Many of its senior members trained by Mossad went on to become instructors for the SSDF

== Activities ==
Led by the former erstwhile and beloved mayor of Mogadishu, Omar Hassan Mohamud "Istarliin", it was the first primary opposition of the Siad Barre regime established in Rome in conclusion of meetings between 1974-1976 by exiled politicians who fled from regime reprisals after the execution of the former Minister of Defence General Salaad Gabeyre Kediye accused of organising a counter coup.

Initially powerful both economically and diplomatically, following the end of the war with Ethiopia in the summer of 1978, SODAF had been invited to merge with the Somali Salvation Front (SSF) led by Colonel Abdullahi Yusuf and two other small parties to form the Somali Salvation Democratic Front (SSDF) with the approval and assistance of President Jomo Kenyatta and his vice-president Daniel Arap Moi before the SSDF moved to Ethiopia and set up a military base there.
