= Ali Sheikh Ahmed =

Somali academic

Ali Sheikh Ahmed علي الشيخ احمد
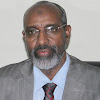
- Occupation: academic
- Title: President of East African Association for Research and Development

Dr Ali Sheikh Ahmed (Somali: Cali Sheekh Ahmed, Arabic: علي الشيخ احمد) is the co-founder and former president of Mogadishu University in Somalia.

== Education background ==
Ali Sheikh Ahmed Abubakar, from an early age he possessed a keen desire for learning which was inspired by his parents. After completing secondary education (1972) in Mogadishu, the capital of Somalia, he was awarded a scholarship by the Kingdom of Saudi Arabia to pursue higher education at the Islamic University of Madinah, where he obtained his BA, MA, and PhD degrees (1973 – 1983). He subsequently held a lecturer position at King Saud University (1983 – 1992) in Riyadh, Saudi Arabia. Dr. Ali has authored numerous books and papers on the history of Islam in the Horn of Africa, the role of education in developing human capacity, peace and reconciliation, and state building. In 1992, he relocated to Mogadishu to assist the country’s educational and social sectors. Ali played a crucial role in the restoration of educational institutions such as schools and universities across the country, bringing hope to many families affected by the conflict.

In 1997, he became the co-founder and first president of Mogadishu University, the first post-collapse institution in higher education in Somalia. Under his leadership, the university expanded rapidly and established centers and institutions for capacity building. Despite the challenges of political instability in the country, higher education for Somali has endured in Mogadishu University.

In 2017, he established the East African Association for Research and Development and is currently serving as the president of the Association.

In addition to his work on education, Ahmed was a member of the Somali Civic Forum reconciliation panel formed in 2004. He was also one of five founders of the Al-Islah Islamic Movement (1978) in Somalia, which played an active role in the Somali National Peace Conference held in Arta, Djibouti, from 20 April to May 5, 2000, culminating in the Arta Accord and formation of the Transitional National Government (TNG).
