= Ahmed Sheikh Jama =

Somali academic, writer, and politician

Ahmed Sheikh Jama أحمد الشيخ جاما

Minister of Information of Puntland
- In office January 2009 – January 2014

Personal details
- Born: Puntland, Somalia
- Died: 9 July 2014 Garowe, Somalia

Ahmed Sheikh Jama (Somali: Axmed Sheekh Jaamac, Arabic: أحمد الشيخ جاما) was a Somali academic, writer, poet and politician. From 2009 to 2014, he served as the Minister of Information of Puntland under the Abdirahman Farole administration. Jama died on 9 July 2014 in Garowe after falling ill. Farole eulogized the late leader as a legendary poet, a role model for Puntland residents, and a patriot who devoted his life to public service.

== See also ==
- Abdullahi Yusuf Ahmed
