= Abdulle Raage Tarawiil =

Somali poet

Abdulle Raage Taraawiil was a Somali poet.

Raage joined Radio Mogadishu in 1960, with an entire collection of Guuroow poems dedicated to addressing nationalistic rhetoric and politics. He was also able to act very well, as did he recite the following verses of the Shabeel Naagood drama play of the 1960s demonstrating displeasure on the policy of Non Alignment by the Government.

Maad dhankaa u kacdaan, qoraxda ay u dhacayso Ama dhankaa u kacdaan, dhanka ay kasoo dhalanayso Dhexda xaa idin taagay, dhulka ha idin liqdee

Why didn't you move to where the sun sets (the West) Or why didn't you move to where the sun rises (the East), Why stand in the middle: may the ground swallow you!

In 1982, he was accused of expressing antigovernment activity and subsequently arrested for four years. In the late 80s amidst the ongoing violence in and around the country, the poet Abdulle wrote a poem describing the problems that lay ahead.

Asluub iyo hadii sharaf jirin, aaminna xumaaday Aadaabtiyoo xishoodkii, haddii laga ugaaroobay Aargoosi reer hebel, haddii laysu aaneeyey Ee ruux aan eed galin, rasaas lagu asqaaysiyey Afdabeed ninkaan wadin, haddii aqalka loo dhaafay

No value, honor or trust is respected When man shuns civility and behaves like a beast Mutually assured destruction, brother against brother Bullets mow down the innocent If you don't have a flaming gun, Armed gangs will rape and loot your households

Abdulle was born in Eeldheer district in 1932. He died in Mogadishu in April 2000.
