= Axyaa Waddani =

Somali poet

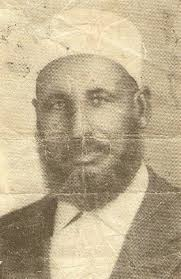
Haji Mohamed Ahmed Liban 'Axyaa Waddani'

Xaaji Maxamad Axmad Liibaan 'Axyaa Waddani' was a famous Somali poet.

== Biography ==
Haji Mohamed was born in Harardere district in 1904. He recorded his first poem in 1922 of a religious genre called Masafo. He would later join the Somali Youth League political party at its inception and write poems for the party to preach patriotic rhetoric for the Greater Somalia masses. For these efforts he became known as "Axyaa Waddani", "the living Patriot", for his poems having far reaching impact outside of his realm.

Haji Mohamed is said to have recorded over several hundred poems captured on audio in Somali and Arabic.

He died in Mogadishu in 1989.
