= Abdulaziz Farah =

Kenyan politician

Abdulaziz Ali Farah is a Kenyan politician and a member of the 11th Kenyan parliament elected from Mandera East Constituency on the ticket of United Republican Party (URP) and with support of Jubilee Coalition in 2013. In the parliament, he served on the Environment & Natural Resources committee. Farah is a Murulle tribesman and received the endorsement of the council of elders of his clan for his first term but was unable to secure the endorsement for a second term in 2017 ending his parliamentary career. He graduated from Kenyatta University in 1995.
