= Badi Ade =

Somali Hawiye clan

Bada Ade
- Hawiye Somali clan
- Ethnicity: (Somalia) Somali
- Location: Somalia
- Parent tribe: Hawiye
- Branches: Afgaab, Xaamud, Caryahan, Subeer, Ibraahim, Ilaabe, Maamiye, Samaroob, Quurwaayle
- Language: (Somalia) Somali (Arab League) Arabic
- Religion: Sunni Islam

Badi Ade (also spelled Baadicade or Badi Ado) is a Somali Hawiye clan. Sometimes called Beesha Baadacade, the clan is a sub-tribe of the Gungundhabe Hawiye branch of the Somalis tribe Baadicadde primarily live in the Hiiraan and in the Middle Shabelle regions of Somalia.

== History ==
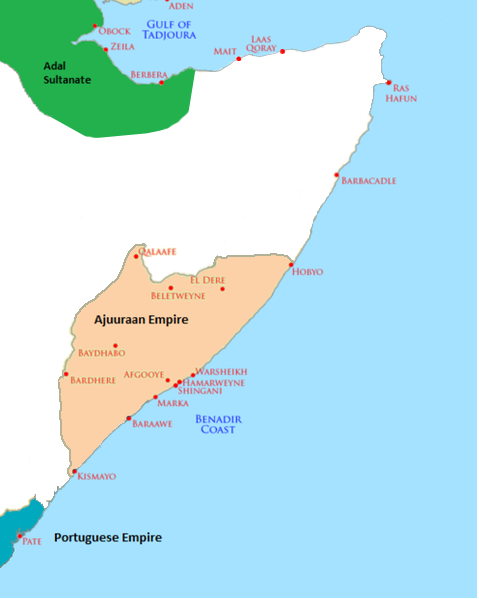
Ajuuraan & Adal map

The Badi Ade clan traces its ancestry to a common ancestor named Hawiye. According to their historical accounts, Hawiye had three sons from his second wife, Ghire: Gugundhabe Hawiye, Gorgarte Hawiye, and Jambeelle Hawiye. Ghire belonged to the Harla people, making the Badi Ade part of the maternal subgroup (Bah Ghirei) of the larger Hawiye clan.The Badi Ade clan descends from Gugundhabe, one of Hawiye's sons. Gugundhabe had three sons: Badi Ade, Jidle, and Jijeele.

During the era of the Ajuran Sultanate, the Badi Ade clan inhabited the coastal region between Mareeg and Hobyo in Galguduud. As pastoralists, they eventually migrated towards the Shebelle River.

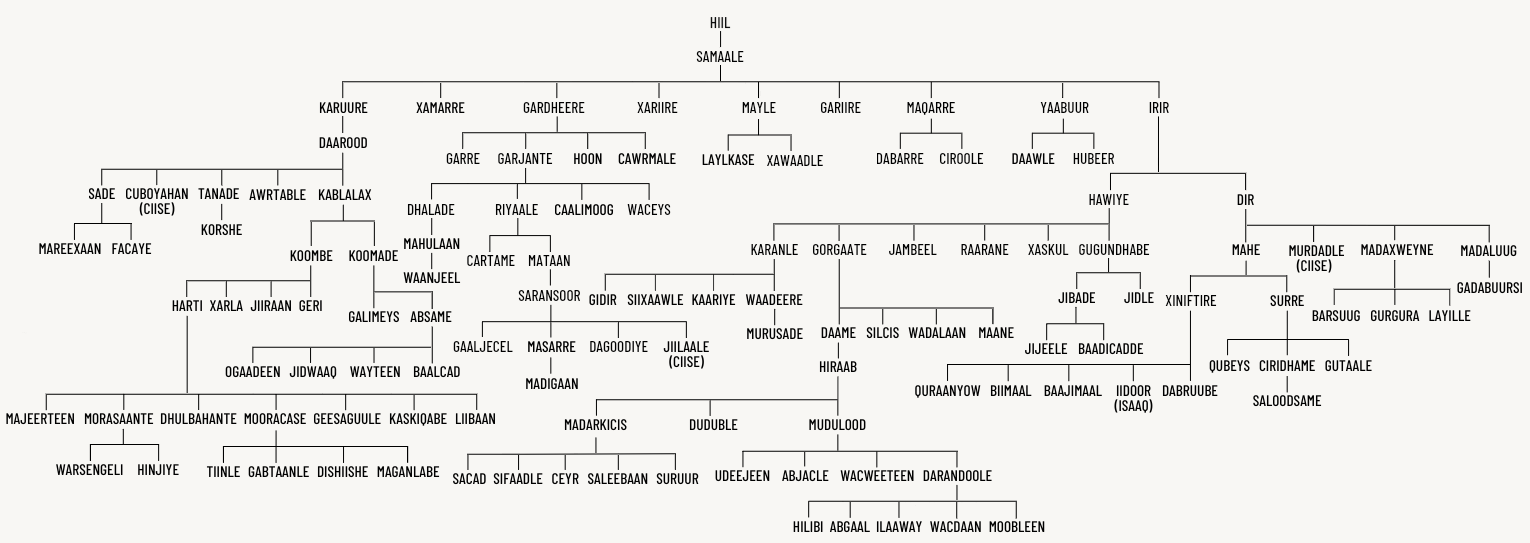
Genealogical tree of Somali clans

This migration led to conflicts with the Ajuran Sultanate, particularly as the Badi Ade came to the aid of their maternal uncle, the Gaalje'el. Following these struggles, the Badi Ade clan settled in the Hiran region, where they continue to maintain their cultural and historical heritage.

Near the Shebelle River, the Badi Ade owned Bantu slaves, who worked as labourers on their farms. This facilitated the Badi Ade in becoming farm owners as well as maintaining their traditional pastoralist lifestyle. These Bantu slaves, known as Jareer, eventually formed a client tribe called Makanne, which continues to exist to this day.

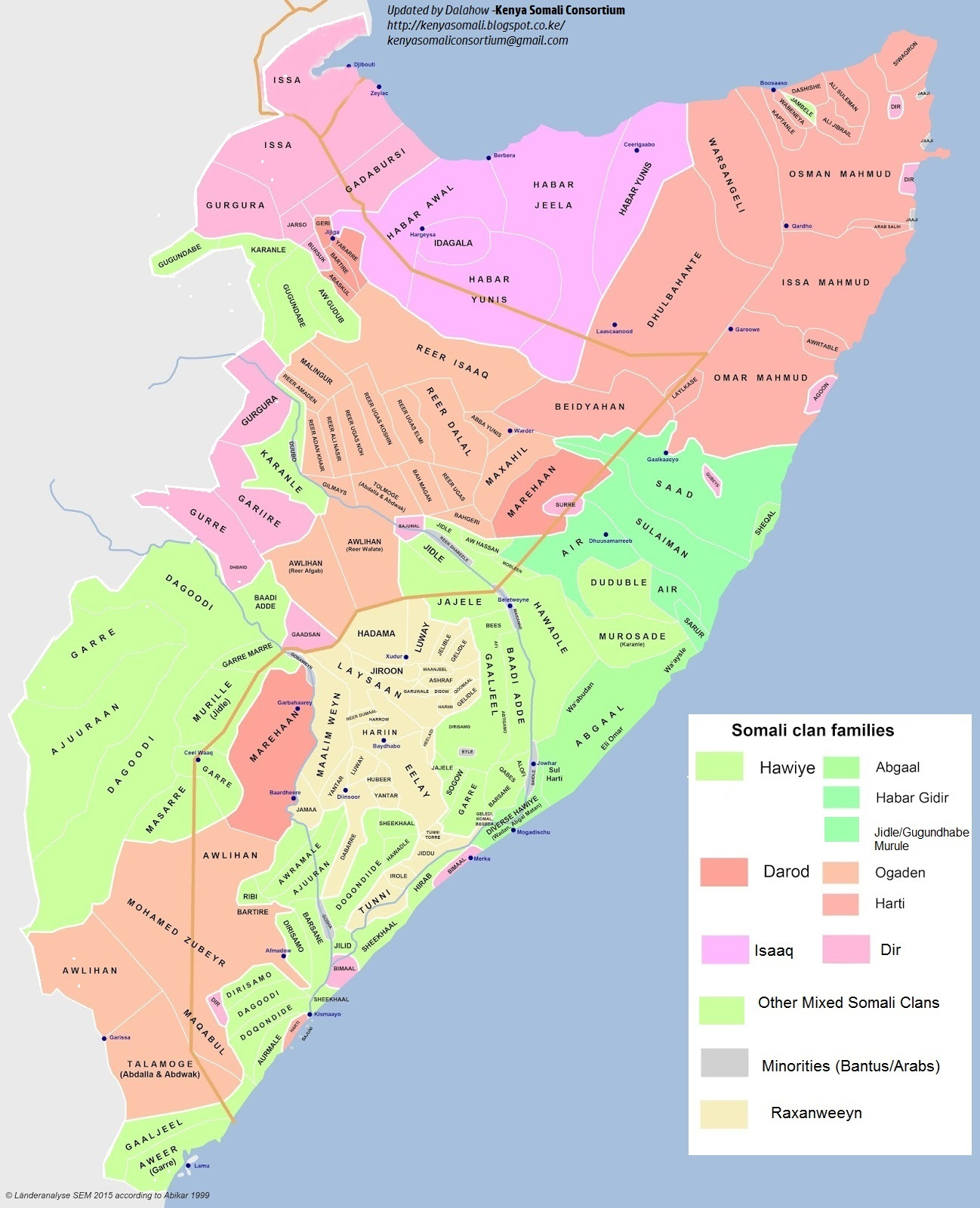
Somali Clans

== Distribution ==
Badi Ade are predominantly pastoralists and are known to concentrate on the western side of Hiraan and Middle Shabelle, specifically in the Buloburte and Jalalaqsi districts in the Hiraan region and the bordering Fidow town of the Middle Shabelle region.
