= Mohamed Hussein Ali =

Kenyan politician

Mohamed Hussein Ali is a Kenyan politician. He belongs to the Orange Democratic Movement and was elected to represent the Mandera East Constituency in the National Assembly of Kenya since the 2007 Kenyan parliamentary election.
