= Sheikh Ali Jimale =

Somali Politician

Sheikh Ali Jimale Barale شيخ علي جمعلي بارال

Personal details
- Born: 1905 Omaad, Somalia
- Died: November 24, 1979 (aged 74) Beledweyne, Somalia
- Party: Somali Youth League
- Education: Regio Corpo Truppe Coloniali

Sheikh Ali Jimale Barale (Somali: Shiikh Cali Jimcaale Baraale, Arabic: شيخ علي جمعلي بارال was a Somali politician. He was the 1st Minister for Labour and Social Affairs during the trusteeship period and also for the newly independent country of the Somali Republic. Ali Jimale's long political career started in 1946 when he became member of the Youth Somali League, the precursor of the Somali Youth League (SYL), Beledweyne branch. From 1946 to 1955 he served, several times, as Secretary of the regional branch of the party in Beledweyne

== Biography ==
Sheikh Ali Jimale, the only child of Jimale Barale and Ghedia Roble was born in 1905 in the village of Omaad, near Matabaan. He hails from the Hawadle, Agon. The son of a village herdsman, he moved to Mogadiscio where he attended Quran School before enrolling in the government run schools. In 1934 he joined the colonial troops, known as “Dubat”. He took part in the Italo-Abyssinian war, and within two years he reached the rank of “Capo Banda”, the highest military rank a native soldier in the “Dubat” contingent could reach. In 1938, at his request, he left the Italian military forces to serve in the Civil Affair Department of the Italian colonial administration. He was first based in Wardheer, and later transferred to Kebri Dahar as senior interpreter. Following the British Military Administration, he established his own commercial business in Beledweyne.

From January 1953 to March 1956 he represented Hiiraan at the Territorial Council (Consiglio Teritoriale), a consultative Council advising the trusteeship Administration on domestic policy In March 1956, following the first political elections in Somalia, he was elected Member of Parliament for the electoral district of Beledweyne District

From May 1956 to July 1959 he served as Minister of Social Affairs (Ministro per gli Affari Sociali);

From July 1959 to August 13, 1960, he served as Minister of Health, Labour and Veterinary Service.

From August 13, 1960 to November 30, 1961 he served again as Minister of Health, Labour and Veterinary Services.

In 1961, Sheikh Ali Jimale became runner up in the first presidential election in Somali history, losing by 1 vote to incumbent president Aden Abdulle Osman.

On November 30, 1961, Sheikh Ali Jimale was relieved of his duties following long standing feud with the Prime Minister, Abdirashid Shermarke. Jimale's removal sparked off a widespread protest in the Hiran Region, particularly in his political stronghold of Belet Uen, where people clamoured against their Minister's dismissal. Messages of solidarity came particularly from paramount chiefs, notables and religious leaders, as well as from SYL branches in Beledweyne and Bulo Burte; these messages accused the Prime Minister of allegedly practicing tribalism. The dismissal of the Minister raised also security concerns to the point that the Minister of the Interior of the time, Abdirizak Haji Hussein, paid an unannounced visit to Beledweyne. The Minister took a tough line, warning the public in Bulo Burte and Beledweyne that the government would take grave measures against those who, in solidarity with Sheikh Ali Jimale, may stir up trouble in the region.

Sheikh Ali Jimale was known for his active participation in parliamentary debates, whether as a member of the ruling party or the opposition. He maintained connections with his electoral base. Known for his political skills and public speaking, Jimale gained increased popularity while campaigning against the 1961 constitutional referendum, where the 'no' vote outnumbered the 'yes' vote in the Hiiraan region.

In 1962, Sheikh Ali Jimale, together with a number of other long time SYl associates, quit the party to establish a new opposition party they called Somali National Congress (SNC) The new party won 22 seats in the 1964 general elections.

The man whose close friends referred to him as “Il Duca del Hiran” (‘The Duke of Hiran’), died at Beledweyne on November 24, 1979.
