= 2006 Islamic Courts Union offensive =

Phase of the Somali Civil War

- Part of the Somali Civil War and the Global War on Terrorism
Date	June 4 – December 20, 2006
Location	Somalia
Result	Ethiopian intervention

Belligerents
Islamic Courts Union	TFG: ARPCT; Puntland; Galmudug; Ethiopia Supported by: United States

Commanders and leaders
Sharif Sheikh Ahmed; Hassan Aweys; Yusuf Indacade; Hassan al-Turki	Mohamed Dhere; Botan Ise Alin (Somalia) Mohamed Qanyare; Omar Finnish; Musa Sudi Yalahow (Somalia) Abdi Qeybdiid; Barre Hiraale; Adde Muse

Strength
4,000 (2006); 500–1000 technicals	6,000 soldiers 300–500 technicals

The 2006 Islamic Courts Union offensive is the period in the Somali Civil War that began in May 2006 with the Islamic Courts Union's (ICU) conquest of Mogadishu from the Alliance for the Restoration of Peace and Counter-Terrorism (ARPCT) and continued with further ICU expansion in the country.

A popular uprising occurred in support of the Courts against the Somali warlord alliance. After decisively defeated a CIA backed warlords during mid-June 2006, the ICU was propelled on the national stage for the first time.

On December 24th 2006, after the initial Ethiopian military intervention began on June 17th and full-scale war erupted on December 19th, Addis Ababa for the first time admitted to a large scale military operation in Somalia.

== Origins ==
The first appearance of Sharia courts to build local stability began immediately after the state completely collapsed in January 1991. In the weeks following the toppling of the Somali Democratic Republic, militias that had routed the government began hunting down civilians based on their clan identity. Around this time, several well-known Somali scholars established Sharia courts to rescue civilians from these attacks and to address the general rising lawlessness.

By the late 1990s, Mogadishu experienced growing optimism as the Islamic Courts, in collaboration with the business community, dismantled hundreds of illegal checkpoints and arrested thousands of militia members operating them. The chairman of the courts declared that these were the first step towards establishing an Islamic government.

During 2000, having liberated a significant portion of the city from warlord control, eleven of the individual Sharia courts amalgamated to establish the Islamic Courts Council. This consolidation led to the unification of their militias into a single cohesive combat force. This development marked a pivotal moment in the civil war, as it signified the emergence of the first major non-warlord affiliated Somali armed force in the city. During the summer of 2000, Islamic Courts fighters were operating in the Banaadiir and Lower Shabelle regions. From Mogadishu south down to the port city of Baraawe, courts personnel were present attempting to establish security.

Prior to 2006, the Somali Islamic Courts effectively operated as a loose federation of regional judiciary systems. The courts had developed their own police detachments, prison system, and increasingly carried out joint military operations with each other.

=== United States involvement ===
During 2003, the American Central Intelligence Agency began covert operations targeting the Courts. The CIA began supporting secular Somali warlords to carry out operations and on numerous occasions, Nairobi-based CIA officers landed on warlord-controlled airstrips in Mogadishu with large amounts of money for distribution to Somali militias. The decision to use of the warlords as proxies was born from fears of once again committing large numbers of American soldiers to Somalia following the disastrous 1993 Battle of Mogadishu.

Throughout Somalia, religious authorities supportive of the ICU began being kidnapped, pushing the organization to adopt a more confrontational stance against the warlords. The CIA backed warlords had a notorious pattern of seizing innocent clerics with little or no intelligence value, which greatly fed into the already existing perception among Somalis that the Americans and the warlords were waging a war against Islam under the guise of the war on terrorism.

== Timeline ==
=== ICU conquest of Mogadishu (May – June 2006) ===
A public uprising occurred in support of the Courts against the warlord alliance. The Americans approved greater funding for the Somali warlords and further encourage them to counter the ICU, a decision made by top officials in Washington which was later reaffirmed by the U.S. National security council during meeting about Somalia in March 2006.

The ICU enjoyed widespread support from Mogadishu citizens and business community against the warlords, greatly aiding its ability to seize and control large swathes of the city. By April 2006 much of Mogadishu had fallen under the control of the ICU after clashes with the warlord alliance.

=== Consolidation of the Islamic Courts Union, Ethiopian intervention ===
During mid-June 2006, the Islamic Courts Union (ICU) decisively defeated a CIA backed alliance of Somali warlords, which propelled the ICU on the national stage for the first time. After gaining authority over the capital, it proceeded to establish a 65-mile radius of control around the city. This was a seminal moment in modern Somali history, as the ICU was now the first group to have consolidated control over all of Mogadishu since the collapse of the Somali state. According to Chatham House, "The Courts achieved the unthinkable, uniting Mogadishu for the first time in 16 years, and re-establishing peace and security".

The leaders of the ICU repeatedly professed that they intended to negotiate with the Transitional Federal Government (TFG) In Baidoa so that it could move into Mogadishu and reunite Somalia. In mid-June, ICU leaders sent a cable to Washington stating that the courts had no interest in being enemies with the United States. ICU delegations later travelled to the United Kingdom raise funds from the Somali diaspora and held meetings with British government officials from the Foreign Office.

The pacification of Mogadishu during mid-2006 saw the ICU coalesce into a government in response to the void left by the corrupt and inept TFG.

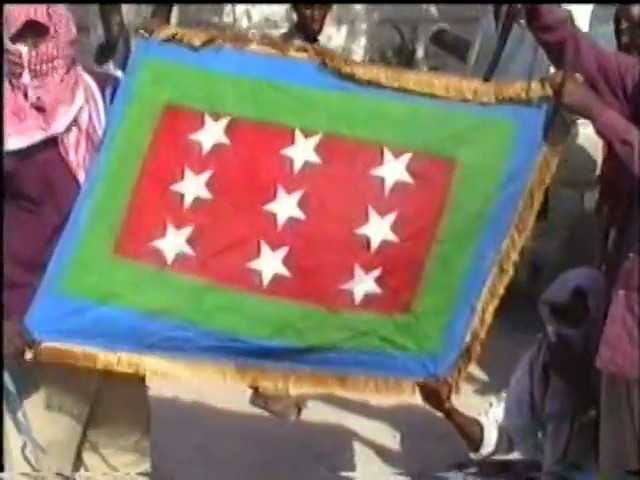
The flag of ARPCT being held upside down by ICU fighters following the Battle of Jowhar

The Ethiopian invasion began soon after the ICU began pushing out of the capital, with thousands Ethiopian National Defence Force (ENDF) troops being deployed around Baidoa city located in Bay region, far inside Somalia, in order to build a bridgehead for a future large scale military operation. On 16 June 2006, Shabeelle Media Network reported that sources in Ethiopia's Somali Region had witnessed a massing of ENDF troops along many of the towns on the Ethiopian–Somali border and on the following day the first Ethiopian troops moved into Somali territory. Local Somali officials and residents in Gedo region reported Ethiopian armored vehicles passing through the border town of Dolow and advancing 50 km inland to Luuq.

The Ethiopian government made the decision to support exiled warlords in order to oppose what in their view is a critical threat posed by the Islamic Courts to their administration of the Ogaden region.

On 19 June 2006 the ICU called for the international community to pressure Ethiopian forces to withdraw from Somalia.

On June 22, 2006, the ICU and TFG met together in Khartoum, Sudan to work towards a peace agreement, in which the ICU recognized the "legality" of the TFG and the TFG recognized the "reality" of the ICU.

==== July 2006 ====
During July, thousands of more Ethiopian troop deployed into Somalia. Reuters estimated that roughly 5,000 ENDF troops had built up inside Somalia by this point. On 23 July 2006, the Ogaden National Liberation Front announced that they had shot down an Ethiopian military helicopter heading for Somalia and publicly warned that Ethiopian military movements in the Ogaden pointed towards an imminent large scale operation directed at southern Somalia.

In late July more Ethiopian troops crossed into Somalia, leading to the collapse of the Khartoum talks between the ICU and TFG. The ICU walked out of talks with the TFG after 200 ENDF troops seized Wajid, taking control of the airport and landing two helicopters. Abdirahman Janaqow, the deputy leader of the ICU executive council, announced soon after that, "The Somali government has violated the accord and allowed Ethiopian troops to enter Somali soil." The TFG claimed that no Ethiopians were in Somalia and that only their troops were in Wajid. BBC News confirmed reports of Ethiopian troops in Wajid during interviews with local residents and aid workers. Following the towns seizure, the ICU pledged to wage a holy war to drive out the ENDF from Somalia.

During late July 2006, over a dozen TFG parliamentarians resigned in protest of the Ethiopian invasion. The escalation of Ethiopian troop deployments into Somalia during July 2006 began raising fears of a possible 'all-out war' in the Horn of Africa, though the 2006 Lebanon War overshadowed news reports of several thousand troops entering Somalia. During late July 2006, over a dozen TFG parliamentarians resigned in protest of the Ethiopian invasion. By August 2006 the TFG was mired in a severe internal crisis and at risk of collapse. Eritrea called for the withdrawal of the ENDF in Somalia to prevent a regional war and the following month accused Ethiopia of plotting a US supported invasion with the aim of destroying the "realization of a unified Somalia"

==== August 2006 ====
The ICU moved into the Mudug region in the beginning of August, capturing Adado on 1 August following negotiations with the local clan Sultan. By August 2006 the TFG was mired in a severe internal crisis and at risk of collapse.

In order to make good on their promise to restore law and order to Somalia, the ICU began advancing into the territory of coastal warlords known to be engaged in piracy. The most infamous pirates in Somalia operated out of Harardhere and Hobyo, and so these towns were targeted for the anti-piracy campaign. The most infamous pirates were from the same clan as the ICU leadership, the Habar Gidir. Harardere, the most infamous piracy port, was captured on 13 August. Hobyo negotiated a surrender with the ICU on August 16.

Barre Hiraale had been careful to avoid a confrontation with the ICU due to the fact that his chief opponent in the Juba Valley Alliance leadership, Mohamed Roble Jim’ale Gobale was pro-ICU. Mohamed Roble had taken part in their battle to control Mogadishu, and had the support of the ICU leadership. Barre Hiraale was pro-Government and held the position of Defence Minister in the Transitional Federal Parliament. Hiraale's fear was an ICU invasion in support of Mohamed Roble, which would lead to division within his own ranks due to partisan Sub-Clan loyalties within the JVA.

=== Advance into Jubaland and taking of Kismayo ===
By September, at least 7,000 Ethiopian troops were in Somalia and had begun arming warlords defeated by the ICU. On September 24, 2006, in order to prevent the deployment of thousands of AU troops in the country, the Courts advanced Jubaland and seized Kismayo, after Barre Hirale's Juba Valley Alliance withdrew from the town in the face of overwhelming opposition and the mutiny of several JVA factions to the ICU. Journalists reported thousands had gathered to welcome the entry of the Courts and that Kismayo had fallen to the ICU without a shot fired. Ahmed Madobe was appoint ICU governor of Kismayo soon after.

The Juba Valley Alliance vowed to retake Kismayo, and regrouped their forces in Bu'ale. Later, on September 29, the ICU declared their intention to unify and centralize their military forces under a single command.

On September 30, 2006, minor skirmishes in the north with Ethiopian troops near the border aggravate the situation further. Ethiopian forces had been massed over the other side of the border from Beledweyne since mid July.

Following the arrest and release of a video showing the torture of Sheikh Mohammed Ismail by Somaliland security forces, an influential cleric in the city of Burao, the Islamic Courts Union warned that it would "forcefully free" arrested clerics in the north if they were not released by Somaliland.

Anti-ICU protests in Kismayo sparked by a ban on the drug Khat by the organization resulted in the outbreak of violence and the imposition of a curfew.

The ICU captures Bu'alle and Badhadhe from the JVA on October 15, pushing the JVA out of Lower Juba entirely. Barre Hirale attempted a final push to recapture Kismayo and Bu'alle through mid October, mustering all of his forces for a final battle near Kismayo where his forces were defeated, along with a simultaneous attempt to capture Bu'alle. Several of the Marehan subclans had opened their own negotiations with the ICU, and his position was weakening by the day. The JVA regrouped their remaining forces in Sakow, though the alliance itself was unravelling.

=== Jihad declared against Ethiopia ===
In October 26 the ICU is victorious in Sakow, capturing the town and pushing the JVA out of Middle Juba as well. The remains of JVA forces pull back to Bardhere in Gedo.

Transitional Government and Ethiopian troops seize Burhakaba briefly from ICU-allied militias, directly violating the Khartoum agreements. The ICU leadership consider the brief capture of Burhakaba as a violation of the peace agreement signed in Khartoum, and further talks, scheduled for the end of the month, seem less and less likely. The fact that the government soldiers were supported by Ethiopian soldiers prompted the ICU leadership to declare a jihad against all Ethiopian soldiers in Somalia. The Beledweyne Sharia court had already issued a call for jihad earlier, but this made it official.

A televised address by Sharif Sheikh Ahmed, chairman of the Supreme Council and the most moderate and respected of the ICU leadership, wearing a military style outfit and holding an AK-47, broke the news of Jihad to Somalia. In a much more low profile move Hassan Aweys, the Shura Council chairman, took it a step further and called for all Ethiopians, Muslim or otherwise, to rise up and overthrow the "oppressive regime of Meles Zenawi".

=== Advances into Galmudug, further conflict with Puntland ===
On November 1, 2006, the ICU forces assume control over Hobyo, which is the capital of South Mudug State, part of Galmudug. Religious leaders in the northern half of Galkacyo (the half controlled by Puntland) set up an Islamic Court, which the government of Puntland vows to dismantle or destroy, creating a tense situation as ICU forces head towards Galmudug-controlled South Galkacyo to protect the new Islamic Court. Abdi Qebdiid, former member of the ARPCT and now an important figure in Galmudug, vows to defeat them.

Barre Hiraale returns to Baidoa, as several branches of his Marehan clan set up Islamic courts in Bardhere and Afmadow and declare their support for the Islamic Courts. As Islamist support north of Bardhere is very strong, and Bardhere was previously the last bastion of anti-ICU sentiment in Gedo, the Gedo region is poised to fall into the hands of the Islamic Courts.

Baidoa's military buildup continues to be plagued by division, as 30 more government soldiers along with their technicals defected to the Islamic Courts.

The ICU enacts into law the Prohibition of Khat in all territories they control on November 17, 2006, due to the concerns of many ICU leaders as to the social effects of Khat use, and in response to violent protests by Khat vendors in Mogadishu that lead to the death of a 13-year-old boy. This decision may prove to be counterproductive to the ICU's agenda of restoring law and order, as prohibition laws historically trend towards increased rather than decreased criminality.

Puntland's president, Adde Musa, signed a deal with the Islamic Court of Galkayo in order to stem the tide of violence that the town had experienced for over a week.

On November 26, armed with over 30 "technicals", gunmen allied with the Islamic Courts have been reported to have taken full control over the town of Abudwaq, in western Galgadud region bordering Ethiopia. Abudwaq was the power base of Abdi Qebdiid, limiting Galmudug to South Galcayo alone.

Ogaden Online reported that the Ethiopian government was masterminded false flag attacks on the ICU.

Matters escalated further as an Ethiopian convoy was ambushed by pro-ICU forces near Baidoa, the day after Ethiopian forces fired missiles at Bandiradley.

Another car bomb exploded in Bakin, on the approaches to Baidoa, on November 30. The minibus had served carrying people between Mogadishu and Baidoa.

=== Advance on Baidoa ===
In December 2, 350 soldiers from the Digil and Mirifle clans defected from the ICU to the government. Dinsoor, a primarily Digil and Mirifle district under Southwestern Somali administration, defects to the ICU. The Digil and Mirifle clans make up the broader Rahanweyn group of clans, and the leader of the Rahanweyn Resistance Army, Aden Saran-Sor, has been accused of opposing the government since October 31.

On December 6, the United Nations Security Council approved a deployment of IGAD peacekeepers exempt from the UN arms embargo to protect Baidoa, effectively taking sides in the conflict. Ethiopia, Kenya and Djibouti were barred from taking part in the peacekeeping operation, leaving it up to Uganda, Tanzania and Eritrea. The resolution is primarily aimed at encouraging Uganda to deploy troops to protect Baidoa, which is a highly controversial issue in Uganda due to the UN arms embargo and the threats of the ICU to fight any peacekeepers in Somalia.

On December 7, 2006, The Eritrean Permanent Mission to the UN officially denied its nation had any troops in Somalia.

On December 8, the ICU reported heavy fighting with government forces, backed by Ethiopian troops in the town of Dinsoor, in what many fear would spark an invasion of the heavily fortified city of Baidoa by the massed ICU forces stationed in Burhakaba. Residents in Baidoa began fleeing the city, in fear of the fighting spilling over into Baidoa.

Reports indicate that the ICU began advancing towards Tyeeglow on December 11, 2006, continuing the encirclement of Baidoa. From Tyeeglow the ICU has the ability to attack the northern supply routes to Baidoa with virtual impunity. To entirely encircle Baidoa, the ICU needs to capture Hudur, Luuk and Wajid, and these towns are all along the road from Tyeeglow.

On December 13, Somalia's prime minister announced Islamic Courts Union (ICU) forces were moving into positions for an attack on the last government stronghold of Baidoa in "what may now be an inevitable war". The settlement of Ufurow, 90 km from the interim government capital at Baidoa, capitulated to the ICU without fighting. ICU troops were said to be within 20 km of Baidoa near Buurhakaba. Government troops held a front line at Daynuunay, and ICU troops — identified by a local resident as being from the SICC (Somalia Islamic Courts Council) — were described as within 2 km of their positions and advancing. Rumors suggested the ICU was also moving to capture the non-aligned area of Tiyoglow 90 km northeast of Boidoa.

A Reuters report cited the ICU claimed 30,000 Ethiopian troops were involved in Somalia, while 4,000 foreign fighters were involved on the side of the ICU. Ethiopia denied having troops other than "military advisors" present.

Meanwhile, Italian special envoy to Ethiopia, Mario Raffaelli, met with the ICU in Mogadishu to attempt peacemaking, but was met with skepticism. Somalia's parliament speaker Sharif Hassan Sheik Aden and ICU chairman Sheik Sharif Sheik Ahmed met in succession with Yemeni president Ali Abdalla Salah. Arab League efforts for peace talks in Khartoum, Sudan, were postponed, angering the ICU.

In Garowe, Puntland on the same day, police opened fire on the security forces surrounding Puntland President Mohamud Adde Muse, protesting lack of payment. It was also reported soldiers robbed a bank because of government neglect.

On December 14, 2006, the ICU entered Salagle, one of the few towns in the Juba region outside of their control. Two soldiers loyal to the TFG Minister of Defense, Col. Barre Hirale, were ambushed and killed between Baardhere and Dinsoor.

On December 15, dozens of former fighters for the TFG arrived in Mogadishu riding six technicals, three trucks armed with antiaircraft guns and three pickups mounting machine guns. The fighters cited their desire to leave was due to Baidoa coming under Ethiopian control. They defected 40 days before (presumably about November 5) and finally reached the capital after moving slowly through the jungle. The ICU claimed over 600 troops have defected since February 2006. The defecting troops were disarmed and ordered to undergo new training. In Washington, Assistant Secretary of State, Jendayi Frazer said that the United States had no plans to commit troops to Somalia, and urged African nations to meet the commitments of the UN resolution for peacekeepers.

On December 16, the Parliament Speaker Sharif Hassan Sheik Aden for the Transitional Government in Somalia bypassed the government and signed an agreement with the Union of Islamic Courts toward a peace initiative, the Transitional Government said the agreement was invalid, however, as he had bypassed his authority.

On December 17, the Islamic Courts claimed 200 troops from the Manas camp in al-Bayan region defected to their side. Salad Ali Jelle, deputy defense minister for the TFG, denied this claim and further asserted the TFG had 6,000 troops under its command ready to defend its territory. Also on the 17th, General Mohamed Muse Hersi, also known as "Adde Muse," President of the autonomous Somali province of Puntland, flew to Baidoa to meet with the TFG.

On December 19, the ICU declared that it was not going to attack after the lapse of the one-week timeframe for Ethiopian withdrawal. Both sides seem to have backed away from a military confrontation at this time. Fifty more government troops were said to have defected in Gedo province and were now with the ICU in Bur Dhubo. TFG Premier Ali Mohammed Gedi raised the claim of foreign fighters present in Somalia to 5000. ICU commander Sheikh Ahmed Hassan Abuu Rayan stated he was positioning an unspecified number more militia troops along the border with Ethiopia in Far Libah town, Hiran region. ICU forces were also said to be approaching Bardhere in Gedo province near the Kenyan border. Colonel Abdulahi Sheik Fara-Tag was named as the commander of the TFG forces defending the town from attack.

== Fall of the Islamic Courts Union ==
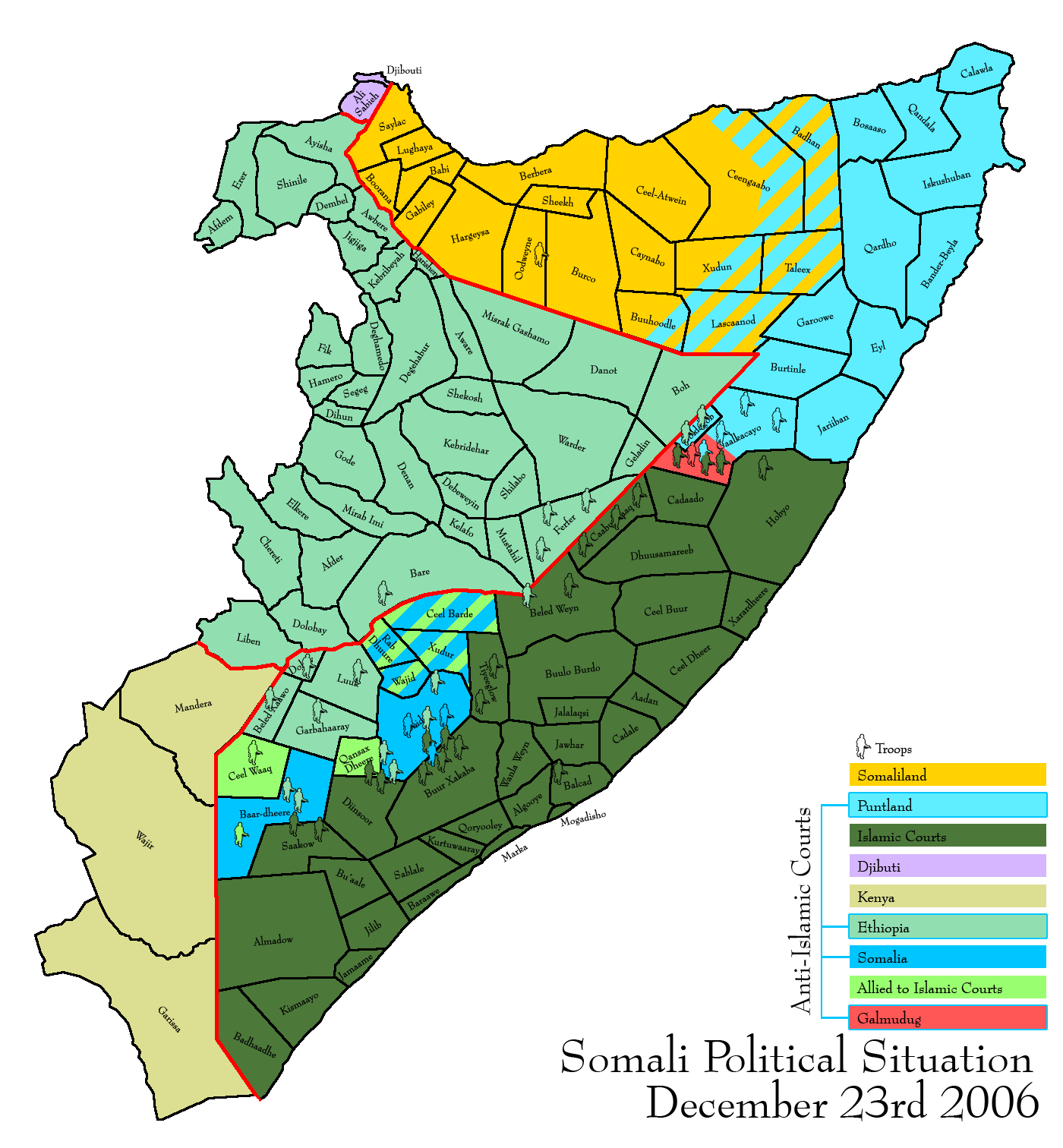
Map depicting the political situation in Somalia on December 23, 2006

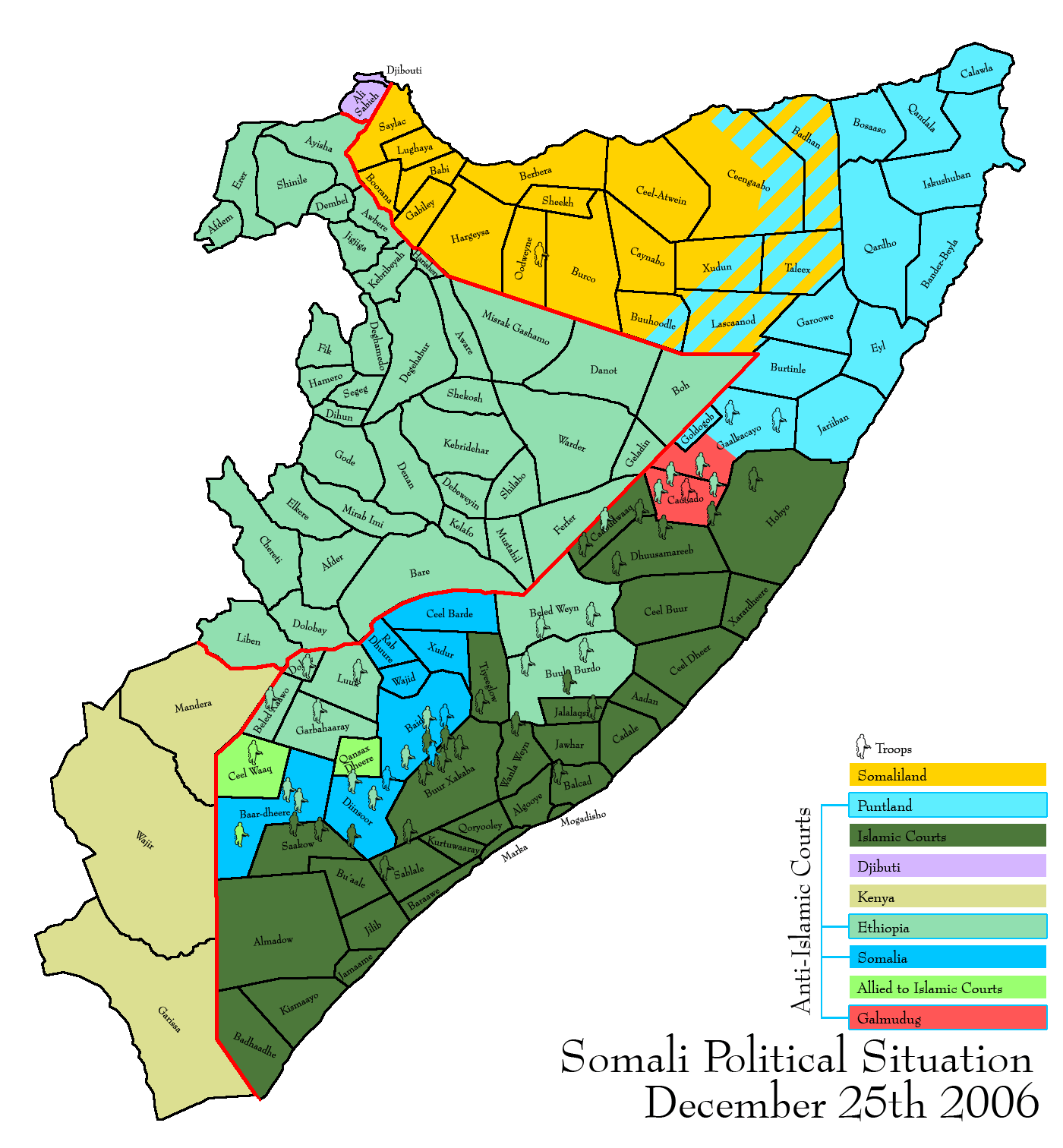
Map depicting the political situation in Somalia on December 25, 2006

On December 20, major fighting broke out around the TFG capital of Baidoa. Thirteen trucks filled with Ethiopian reinforcements were reported en route to the fighting. However, leaders of both groups are keeping an option open for peace talks brokered by the EU.

On December 22, nearly 20 Ethiopian tanks were seen heading toward the front line. According to government sources Ethiopia has 20 T-55 tanks and four attack helicopters in Baidoa. It is not known if these tanks are taking part in the battle.

On December 23, Ethiopian tanks and further reinforcements arrived in Daynuunay, 30 kilometres east of Baidoa; prompting ICU forces to vow all-out war despite a commitment to an EU-brokered peace. Heavy fighting continued in Iidale and Dinsoor.

On December 24, Ethiopia admits that its troops are fighting the Islamists, after stating earlier in the week that it had only sent several hundred military advisors to Baidoa. Heavy fighting erupted in border areas, with air strikes and shelling being reported. Eyewitness said Ethiopian troops bombarded the ICU-held town of Beledweyne. According to Ethiopian Information Minister Berhan Hailu: "The Ethiopian government has taken self-defensive measures and started counter-attacking the aggressive extremist forces of the Islamic Courts and foreign terrorist groups."

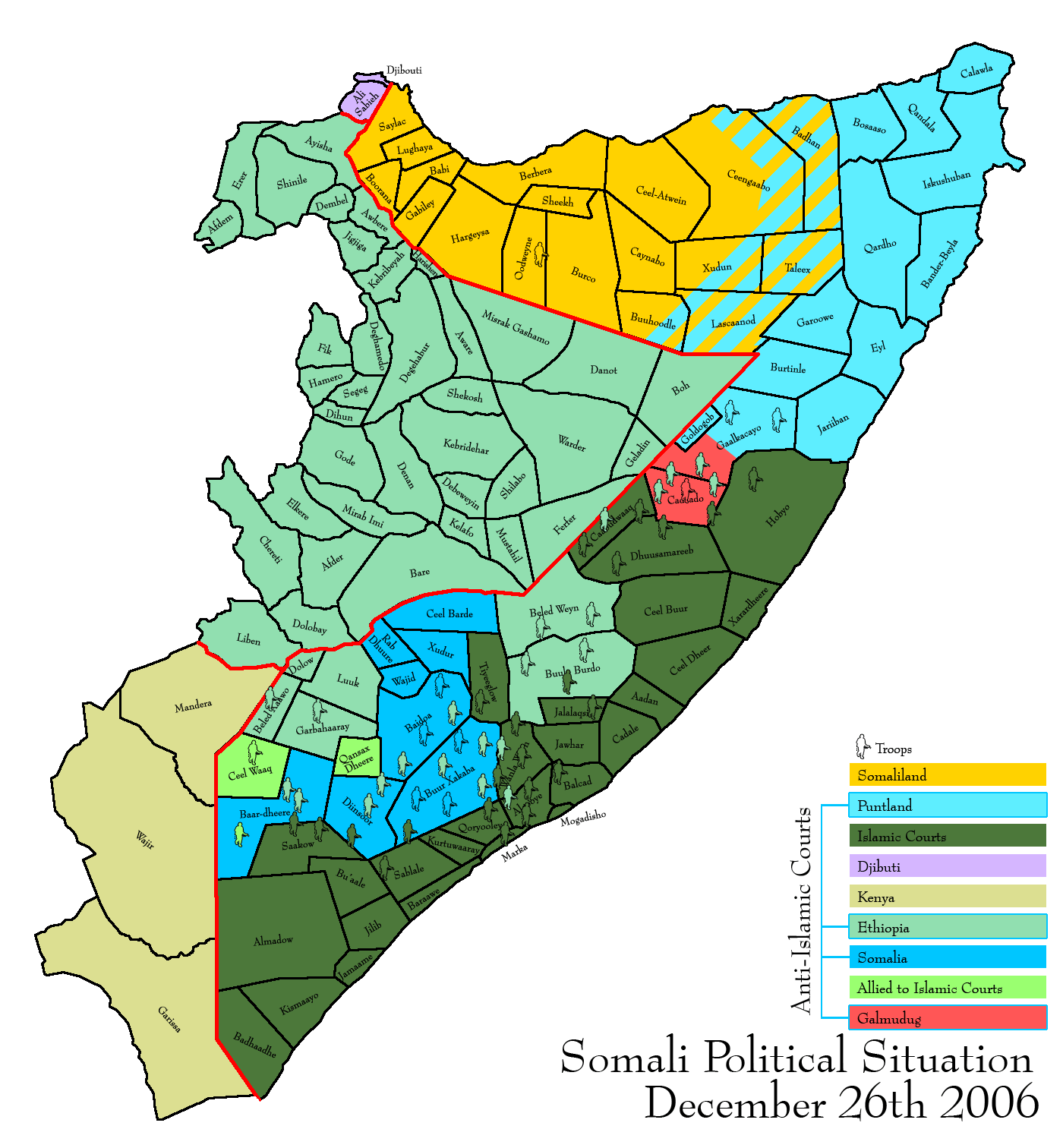
Map depicting the political situation in Somalia on December 26, 2006

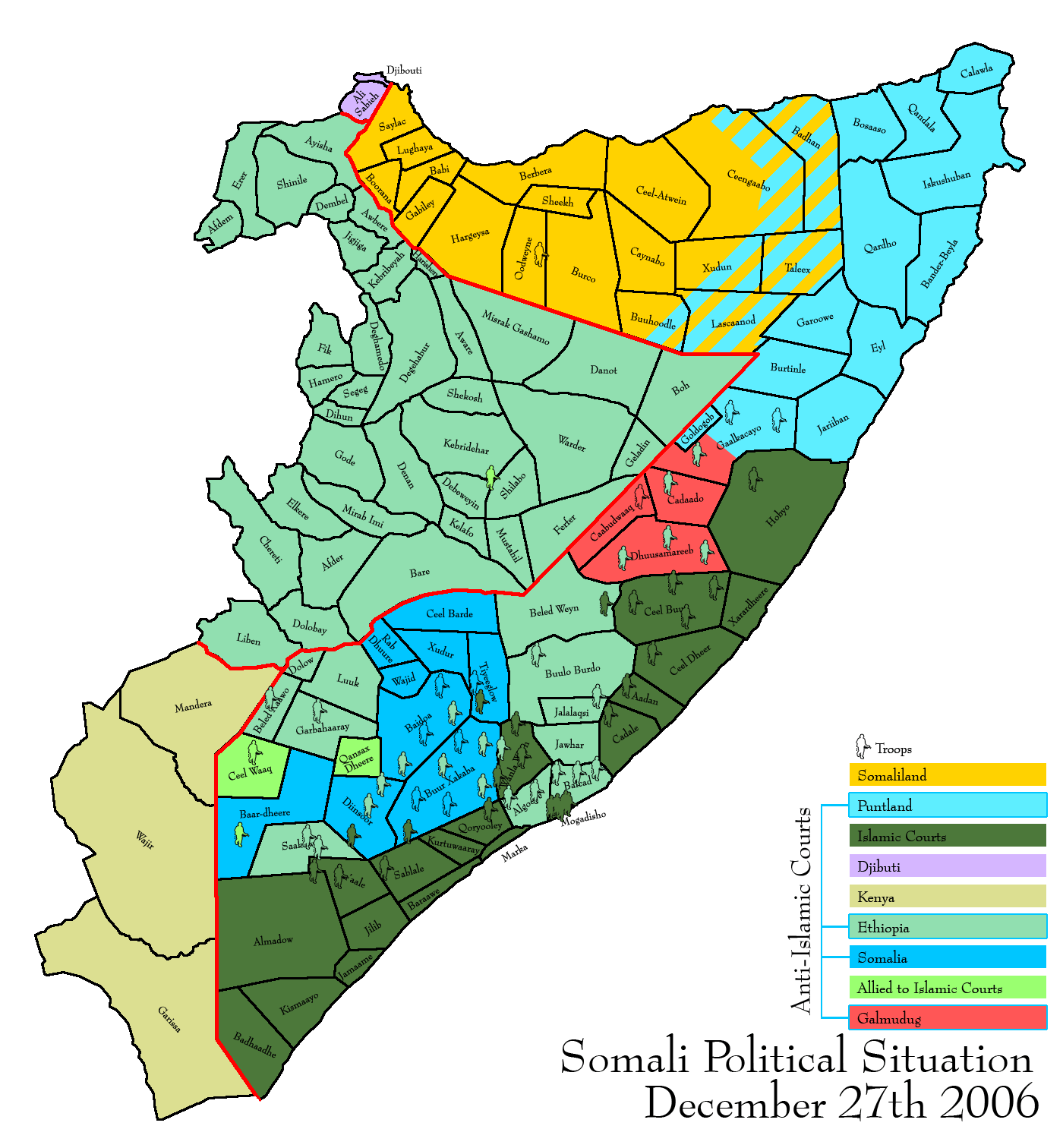
Map depicting the political situation in Somalia on December 27, 2006

On December 25, Ethiopian and Somali forces captured Beledweyne, with ICU forces fleeing Beledweyne at the same time Ethiopian fighter jets bombed two airports. Heavy fighting was also reported in Burhakaba.

On December 26, the ICU was in retreat on all fronts, losing much of the territory they gained in the months preceding the Ethiopian intervention. They reportedly fell back to Daynuunay and Mogadishu.

On December 27, Ethiopian and Somali government forces were reported en route to Somalia's capital, Mogadishu after capturing the strategic town of Jowhar, 90 km from the capital. The UIC were in control of little more than the coast. Islamist leaders evacuated many towns without putting up a fight. Also, the UIC top two commanders, defense chief Yusuf Indade and his deputy Abu Mansur were away on the Hajj pilgrimage in Mecca.

After the Fall of Mogadishu to the Ethiopian and government forces on December 28, fighting continued in the Juba River valley, where the UIC retreated, establishing a new headquarters in the city of Kismayo. Intense fighting was reported on December 31 in the Battle of Jilib and the ICU frontlines collapsed during the night to artillery fire, causing the ICU to once again go into retreat, abandoning Kismayo, without a fight and retreating towards the Kenyan border.

== Bibliography ==
=== Books ===
- Elmi, Afyare Abdi (2010). Understanding the Somalia Conflagration: Identity, Political Islam and Peacebuilding. Pluto Press. ISBN 9780745329741.
