= Hassan Mungab =

Somali politician

Hassan Mungab حسن محمد حسين مونجاب
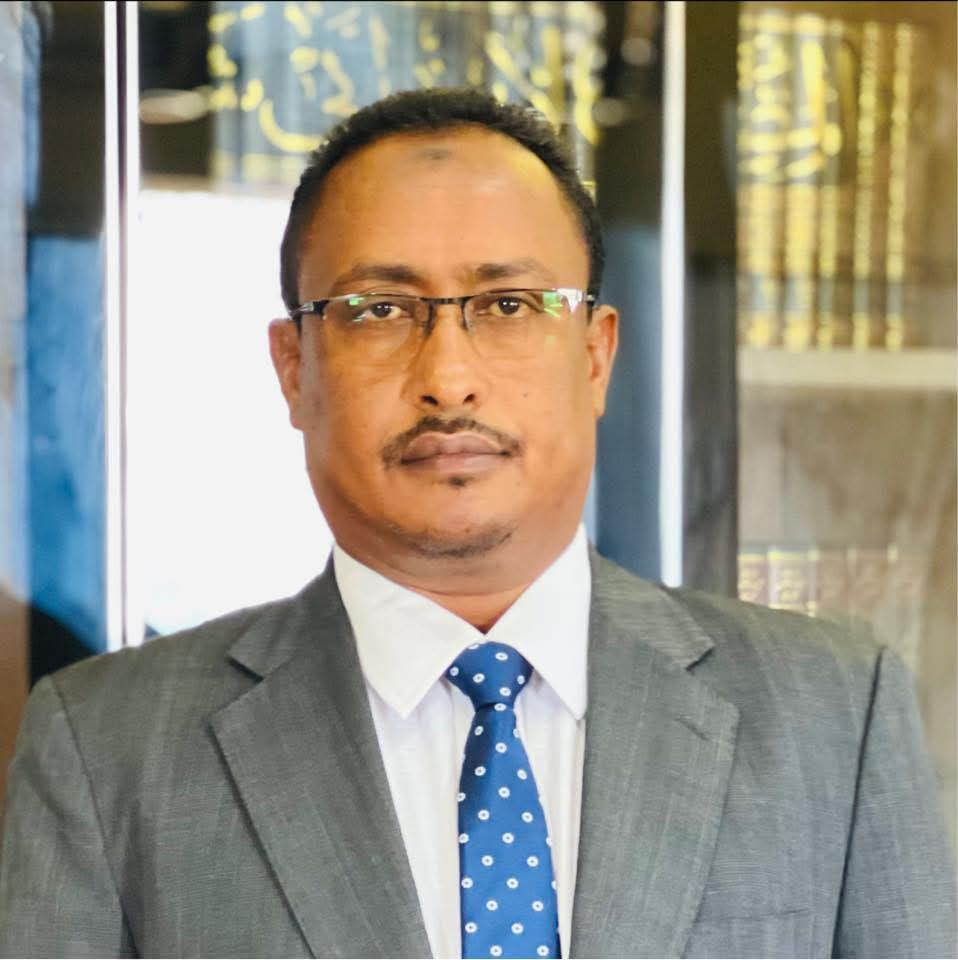

34th and 41st Mayor of Mogadishu
- Incumbent
- Assumed office 29 February 2025
- President: Hassan Sheikh Mohamud
- Preceded by: Mohamed Ahmed Amir
- In office 27 February 2014 – 26 October 2015
- President: Hassan Sheikh Mohamud
- Preceded by: Mohamed Nur
- Succeeded by: Yusuf Hussein Jimaale

State Minister of Justice
- In office August 2016 – 8 February 2017
- President: Hassan Sheikh Mohamud
- Prime Minister: Omar Sharmarke

Chief of the Supreme Military Court of Somalia
- In office 2011 – 18 February 2014
- President: Hassan Sheikh Mohamud
- Preceded by: Sheikh Awil Hussein
- Succeeded by: Liban Ali Yarrow

Personal details
- Born: 31 March 1972 (age 54) Muungaab town, Warsheikh district in Hirshabelle Somalia
- Party: Independent

Hassan Mohamed Hussein (Muungaab) (Arabic: حسن محمد حسين مونجاب) is a Somali politician. He served twice as Mayor of Mogadishu & Governor of the Banaadir region between 27 February 2014 and 26 October 2015 and since 28 May 2025. He also served as State Minister of Justice between August 2016 and 8 February 2017 and became the chief of military court of Somalia.

== Early life and education ==
Hussein Mungab was born in Shabelada dhaxe Region on 31 March 1972. Hussein Mungab hails from southern Somalia. He belongs to the Galmaax Abgaal Hawiye clan. Hussein and his family came to Mogadishu in the late 1980s. After graduating from high school he moved to Sudan. Hussein has a Bachelor and Master Degree's in Shariah Wal Qanun from International University of Africa located in Sudan.

Hussein Mungab previously served as a chairman in the Somali Armed Forces' military court.

== Mayor of Mogadishu ==
=== Appointment ===
On 27 February 2014, Hussein Mungab was appointed Mayor of Mogadishu and Governor of the Banaadir region by presidential decree. Part of an effort to firm up on municipal security, the appointment came after consultations between President Hassan Sheikh Mohamud, Prime Minister Abdiweli Sheikh Ahmed and Interior Minister Abdullahi Godah Barre. Hussein replaced Mohamed Nur (Tarsan) in the mayorship.

=== New mayoral office ===
In March 2014, Hussein Mungab opened a new mayoral office in the capital. The headquarters were relocated to an area in north Mogadishu.

=== Municipal reforms ===
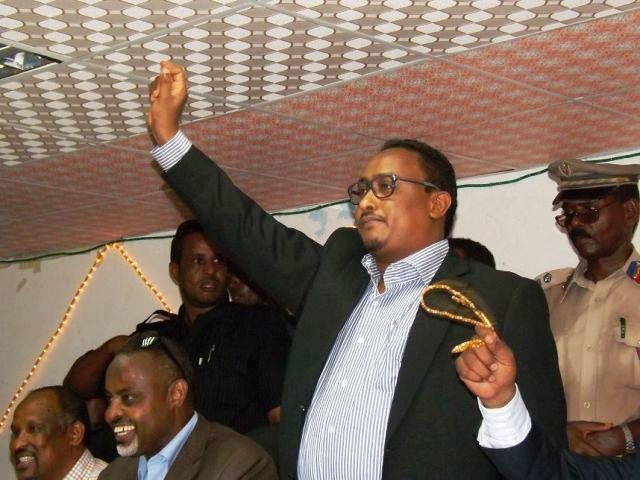
Mayor of Mogadishu Hassan Mohamed Hussein at a political rally in 2014.

Since taking office, Hussein Mungab has made a number of reforms aimed at strengthening Mogadishu's district administrations. In early March 2014, he met with the Banaadir region's 17 District Commissioners to discuss general safety and tidiness. The gathering concluded with a pledge to ensure that there is security guidance as well as public services in place in each of the municipality's districts. The Benadir Regional Administration concurrently conducted operations in the city, including distributing national identity cards.

In April 2014, Hussein Mungab announced that his administration would reopen roads in the capital that had been barricaded. Non-governmental and inter-governmental agencies as well as foreign embassies had set up the roadblocks on certain narrow streets around their compounds for safety reasons. According to Hussein Mungab, the decision to remove the barricades was in response to demands by pedestrians and drivers to permit again access to the roads, and was facilitated by improvements in local security.

=== District Commissioners ===
In July 2014, Hussein co-chaired a skills-training seminar in Mogadishu for all of the Banaadir region's District Commissioners. The workshop was the first of its kind since the mayor took office, and was launched in conjunction with the Ministry of Interior and Federalism. It focused on teaching good governance techniques to the young municipal officials, including public finance management, rule of law, security, and tax collection skills to finance public projects.

Hussein Mungab's administration had appointed the District Commissioners through a new selection process centered on the officials' respective professional background and educational qualifications.

=== 2016 municipal elections ===
In July 2014, Hussein Mungab announced that municipal elections are slated to be held in 2016 to determine his successor as Mayor of Mogadishu. The scheduled ballot is the first of its kind in many years, and will also see new District Commissioners voted into office.

=== Assassination attempt ===
On 27 July 2014, Hussein Mungab survived a landmine explosion targeting a convoy he was traveling in near the Lafweyn hotel in Mogadishu's Huriwa district. An elderly male pedestrian was later confirmed dead, and a woman was also wounded during the blast. According to Benadir region spokesman Ali Farah, Hussein was unharmed and was subsequently escorted to his office nearby.

=== Import regulation ===
In August 2014, Hussein Mungab's office announced strict new regulations to control the importation of medication and foodstuffs by aid agencies operating in Mogadishu. The tightened restrictions include meting out large fines and other punitive measures against agencies that are found warehousing expired items. The municipal authorities also indicated that they would begin supervising warehouses and general storage facilities operated by international agencies, including the UN.

=== Government centers renovation ===
In September 2014, Hussein Mungab announced that the Benadir administration would renovate important government centers in Mogadishu. He indicated that the municipal authorities would prioritize rehabilitation of state buildings and structures that had incurred damage during the civil war. The initiative is aimed at strengthening service delivery, with the Mayor calling on the business community and residents to support the renovations. To this end, Hussein Mungab was overseeing the rehabilitation of the capital's former Fisho Guverno compound. The Benadir administration also opened the Ansaloti center in the Hamar Jajab district, one of several key local markets.

=== Poland security support ===
In October 2014, Hussein Mungab held a closed door meeting in Mogadishu with delegates from a Poland-based security organization. The officials discussed various municipal matters, including reconstruction, development, social service delivery and security initiatives in the capital. According to Benadir administration spokesman Ali Mohamud Seko, the Polish firm pledged to support the city authorities' efforts at strengthening safety. To this end, the company will install satellite surveillance facilities in Mogadishu to monitor local security.

=== Benadir-UN bilateral cooperation ===
In November 2014, Mayor Hussein Mungab met with UN Special Representative for Somalia Nicholas Kay in Mogadishu. The two officials discussed a number of bilateral issues, including strengthening municipal security, training local government forces, and engaging the indigent. Hussein Mungab also indicated that he and Kay agreed to accelerate ties between the Benadir administration and the UN. Additionally, Kay applauded Hussein Mungab for pledging to hold fair city elections.

=== TIKA development projects ===
In December 2014, Hussein Mungab met with Turkish International Cooperation and Development Agency (TIKA) officials in Ankara to discuss development initiatives that the Turkish company is implementing in Somalia. The focus of the gathering was on accelerating the completion of these projects, particularly the construction of the Wadnaha thoroughfare that connects a number of Mogadishu's districts. Additionally, Hussein Mungab urged the firm to continue the development activities that it had already begun, and commended it for its existing work in support of the Somali government and general public. TIKA Deputy Chairman Ali Maskan in turn pledged that his company would complete the various projects in a timely manner.

=== District development projects ===
In December 2014, Hussein Mungab opened a new police station in the Benadir region's Shibis district. According to the Governor, the facility would strengthen the administration's presence in the area and thus improve local security. He added that construction of the station was overseen by the Benadir regional administration, with funding provided by the United States Agency for International Development. Hussein Mungab also indicated that the facility is fully equipped, and includes a commander's office, two cells, toilets, and telecommunications equipment, among other typical amenities. Additionally, the governor noted that the police station was one of several developments completed during district commissioner Abdifatah Noor Ali's eight months in office, which also include new tarmac roads and four administration departments. Hussein Mungab likewise announced that his administration was slated to open new health centers providing free medical expertise, schooling and other social services to residents in the broader Benadir region.

In January 2015, Hussein Mungab led a ribbon cutting ceremony for the launch of several new development projects in the capital's Abdulaziz district. The initiatives include a new road and health center, which aim to improve the area's aesthetic appeal and social service delivery. District Commissioner Omsan Muhiadin Ali Arif also took part in the launch event, and commended Hussein for implementing the development projects. Governor Hussein Mungab in turn indicated that the initiatives are part of his administration's broader urbanization campaign. Additionally, he launched the installation of 333 new solar lights in the city's Industrial Street.

In February 2015, Governor Hussein Mungab also launched two new paved roads between Hawlwadaag Interjection and Bar Ubah as well as Adan Adde Interjection and Arwo Idko in the capital's Bakara Market. The roads are each one kilometer in length, and their construction was funded by the Somali Chamber of Commerce and Industry. The initiative is part of a broader campaign by Hussein to build all of Mogadishu's roads through a public-private financing paradigm. In March 2015, Mayor Hussein Mungab officially inaugurated another new tarmac road in Bakara Market. The street's construction was financed by the Mogadishu municipality and local business community, and is also one kilometer in length.

=== Municipal beautification ===
In January 2015, Governor Hussein Mungab took part in a conference on city beautification and cleanliness in the Benadir region's Deyniile district. The attendees included other Benadir administration representatives, the director of national media Abdirahman Sheikh Yussuf Aladaala, and Benadir district commissioners. The officials touched on municipal sanitation, and ways in which the Mogadishu government and residents could spruce up the capital ahead of various international conferences that are slated to be held there. Hussein Mungab subsequently announced that his administration would take on most of the scheduled development initiatives in the district. The Deyniile district commissioner in turn pledged to cooperate with the other district authorities to firm up on essential services in the city.

As part of its municipal beautification campaign, the Benadir administration concurrently razed illicit kiosks from the sidewalks between Makka Al-Mukarama's Jubba and Dabka junctions. The cleanup project aims to improve the city's overall facade and bring back some of its old charm. The Benadir authorities also organized a sanitation campaign contest for all of the capital's 16 districts, with Governor Mungab naming Hamarjajab district the cleanest.

=== Benadir administration decrees ===
In April 2015, Hussein Mungab's Benadir administration issued a number of decrees aimed at strengthening adherence to municipal regulations. According to Benadir Deputy Governor Mohamed Ahmed Diriye, street car washes in the Banaadir area would thereafter be disallowed, as they constitute a public nuisance. Individuals who vandalize streetlights, pavements and other public property were also issued a warning. Additionally, littering on roads was prohibited, as was the erection of roadblocks by hotel owners.

=== Left the Office ===
In October 2015 Somalia President Hassan Sheikh Mohamud Decided to Replace Mr Muungaab. Youssef Hussein Jim'ale. ( Secretary of the PD Party. Which is founded by the President ) was named the new Mayor of Mogadishu.
