= Mayor of Mogadishu =

Executive of the capital of Somalia

Mayor of The City of Mogadishu
- Seal of Mogadishu

- Flag of Mogadishu

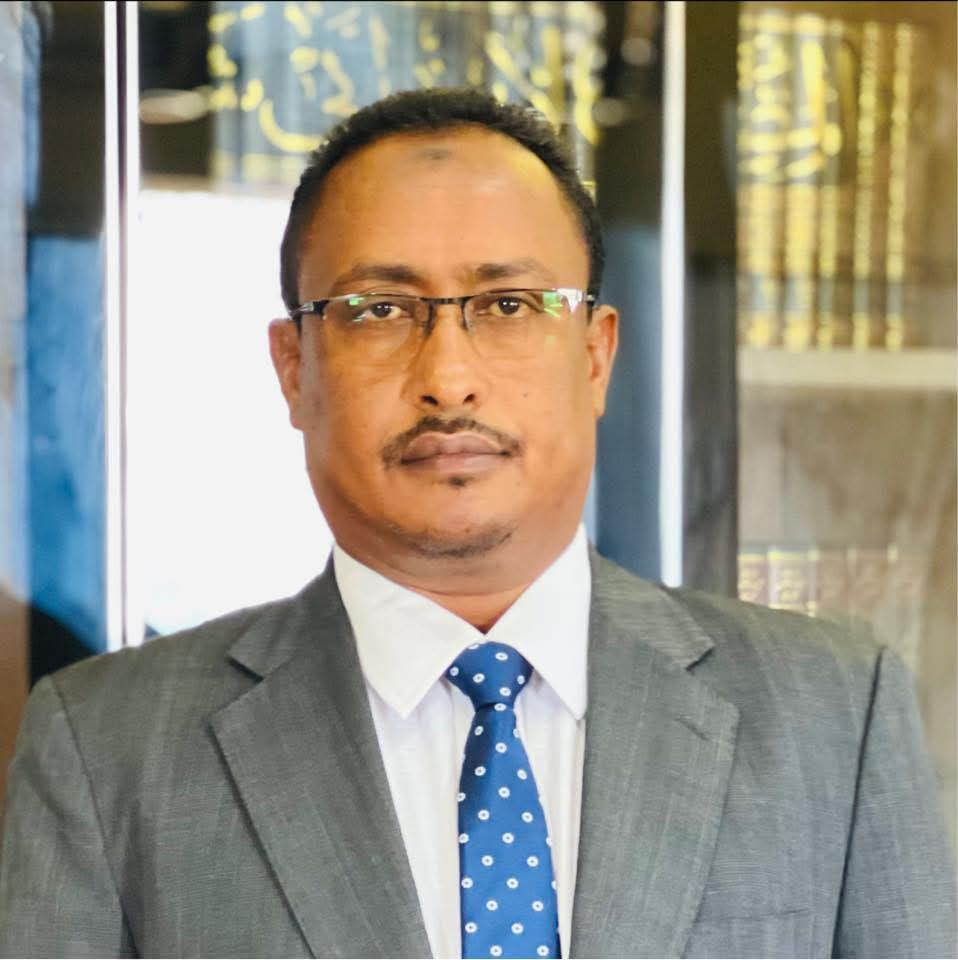
- Incumbent; Hassan Mohamed Hussein (Muungaab) since 29 February 2025
- Style: Mr. Mayor
- Appointer: Hassan Sheikh Mohamud
- Formation: 1936
- Deputy: Isse Gure, Abdimajid and Yabooh
- Website: https://bra.gov.so/

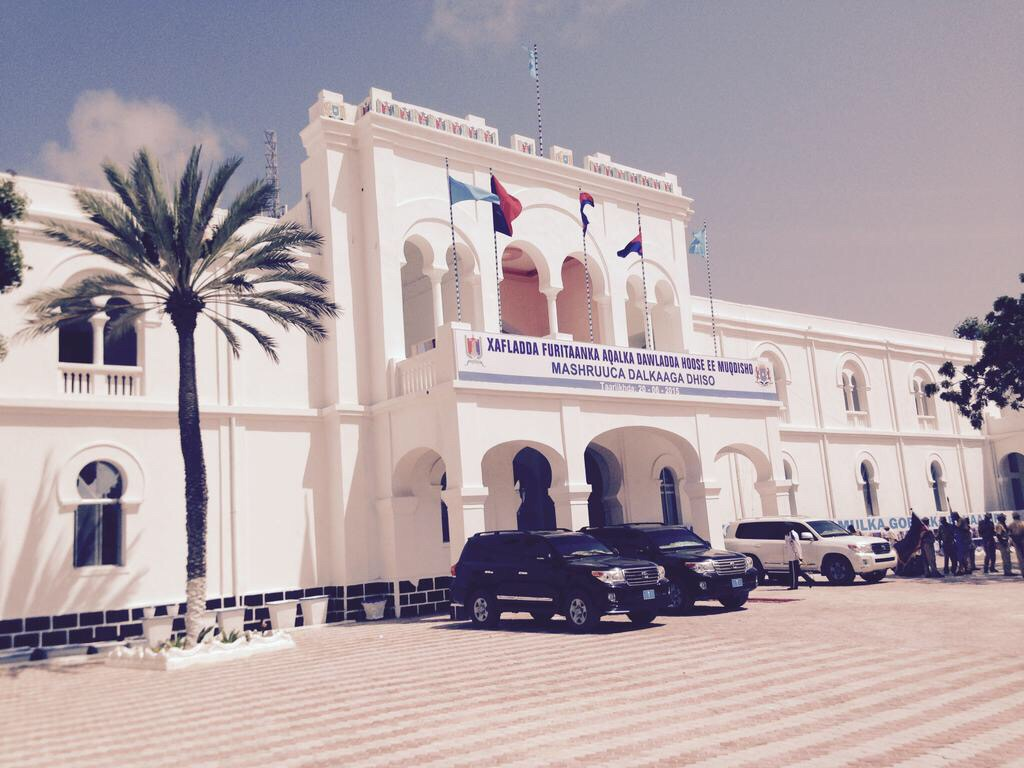
Mogadishu City Hall, where the mayor's office is located.

The Mayor of Mogadishu is head of the executive branch of Mogadishu, the capital of Somalia. The mayor's office administers all city services, public property, police and fire protection, most public agencies, and enforces laws within the city. Mayor Sheik Yousuf Hussein Jim'ale was appointed on 14 September 2022 and succeeded the Mayor Omar Mohamoud Mohamed Filish.

The mayor's office is located in Mogadishu City Hall, which was recently renovated after years of abandonment and decay during the Somali Civil War. The mayor is not elected, but is appointed by the President of Somalia. The mayor also holds the title of Governor of Benaadir, an administrative region whose territory is coextensive with the city of Mogadishu.

== History of the office ==
The first mayor of Mogadishu was Romeo Campani, an Italian expatriate who was appointed by General Rodolfo Graziani, the Governor of Italian Somaliland. Beginning in 1956 with the appointment of Mohamed Sheekh Jamaal also known as Jamaal Jabiye, the office of mayor has been held by native Somalis. After Somalian independence from Italy in 1960, the mayor has been appointed by the President of Somalia.

== List of mayors ==
=== Colonial mayors and first Somali mayor in colonial era ===
The following mayors of Mogadishu were appointed by the Governor of Italian Somaliland. From 1941 to 1949, resulting from World War II, the British occupied the territory and appointed the mayors, who remained Italians. Beginning in 1953, native Somalis were appointed to the office.

#	Image	Mayor	Term	Governor
1		Romeo Campani	1936 – 1937	Rodolfo Graziani Angelo de Ruben Ruggiero Santini
2		Rag Scarpa	1937 – 1937	Francesco Saviero Caroselli
3		Dr. Sicar	1937 – 1937	
4		Luigi Barbino	1937 – 1937	
5		Marcelio Baudino	1937 – 1938	
6		Sanatore Guliano	1938 – 1941	Gustavo Pesenti Carlo De Simone
7		Pietro Bartelli	1941 – 1950	Sir Reginald Dorman-Smith William Eric Halstead Scuphan Denis Henry Widcham Eric Armar Vully de Candole Geoffrey Massey Gamble
8		Oliveri Olivierio	1950 – 1950	Giovanni Fornari
9		Enrico Aliviero	1950 – 1953	Giovanni Fornari
10		Carlo Vecco	1953 – 1956	
11		Mohamed Sheekh Jamaal (Jamaal Jabiye)	1956 – 1958	
12		Ali Omar Sheegow	1958 – 1960	

=== Post-independence mayors ===
Since Somalia's independence on 1 July 1960, mayors of Mogadishu have been appointed by the President of Somalia:

#	Image	Mayor	Term	Party	President
13		Ahmed Rage	1960 – 1962	Somali Youth League	Aden Abdullah Osman Daar
14		Ahmed Muude	1962 – 1963	Somali Youth League	Aden Abdullah Osman Daar
15		Shariif Imaankeey	1963 – 1965	Somali Youth League	Aden Abdullah Osman Daar
16		Cumar Istarliin	1965 – 1966	Somali Youth League	Aden Abdullah Osman Daar
17		Shariif Caydaruus	1966 – 1970	Somali Youth League	Abdirashid Ali Shermarke Sheikh Mukhtar Mohamed Hussein
18	Ahmed Mohamud Adde aka Qorweyne Mayor of Mogadishu	Ahmed Mohamud Adde (Qorweyne)	1970 – 1970	Somali Revolutionary Socialist Party	Siad Barre
19		Osman Jeelle	1970 – 1973	Somali Revolutionary Socialist Party	Siad Barre
20		Hassan Abshir Farah	1973 – 1976	Somali Revolutionary Socialist Party	Siad Barre
21		Yusuf Aburas	1976 – 1981	Somali Revolutionary Socialist Party	Siad Barre
22		Cabdullaahi Salaad	1981 – 1982	Somali Revolutionary Socialist Party	Siad Barre
23		Hassan Abshir Farah	1982 – 1987	Somali Revolutionary Socialist Party	Siad Barre
24		Ali Haji muse	1987 – 1990	Somali Revolutionary Socialist Party	Siad Barre
25		Syedomar Afrah	1990 – 1990	Somali Revolutionary Socialist Party	Siad Barre
26		Ahmed Jilacow	1990 – 1991	Somali Revolutionary Socialist Party	Siad Barre
27		Cabdullaahi Gacal Sebriye	1991 – 1994	United Somali Congress	Ali Mahdi Muhammad
28		Hussein Ali Ahmed	1994 - 2000	United Somali Congress	Ali Mahdi Muhammad
29		Abdullahi Muse Hussein	2000 – 2004	United Somali Congress	Ali Mahdi Muhammad
29		Abdullahi Muse Hussein	2000 – 2004	United Somali Congress	Ali Mahdi Muhammad Abdiqasim Salad Hassan
30		Ibrahim Shaweye	2005 - 2007		Abdullahi Yusuf Ahmed
31		Adde Gabow	2007 – 2007		Abdullahi Yusuf Ahmed
32		Mohamed Omar Habeb	2007 – 2008		Abdullahi Yusuf Ahmed
–		Mohamed Dhakahtur	2008 – 2010		Adan Mohamed Nuur Madobe Sharif Sheikh Ahmed
33		Mohamed Nur	2010 – 2014	Justice and Communist Party	Sharif Sheikh Ahmed Hassan Sheikh Mohamud
34		Hassan Mohamed Hussein	2014 – 2015	Independent	Hassan Sheikh Mohamud
35		Yusuf Hussein Jimaale	2015 – 2017	Peace and Development Party	Hassan Sheikh Mohamud
36		Thabit Abdi Mohammed	2017 – 2018		Mohamed Abdullahi Mohamed
37		Abdirahman Omar Osman	2018 – 2019		Mohamed Abdullahi Mohamed
38		Omar Muhamoud Finnish	2019 – 2022		Mohamed Abdullahi Mohamed
39		Yusuf Hussein Jimaale	2022 – 2024	Union for Peace and Development Party	Hassan Sheikh Mohamud
39		Mohamed Ahmed Amiir	2024 – 2025		Hassan Sheikh Mohamud
40		Hassan Mohamed Hussein	2025 - present	Union for Peace and Development Party	Hassan Sheikh Mohamud

== Vice mayors ==
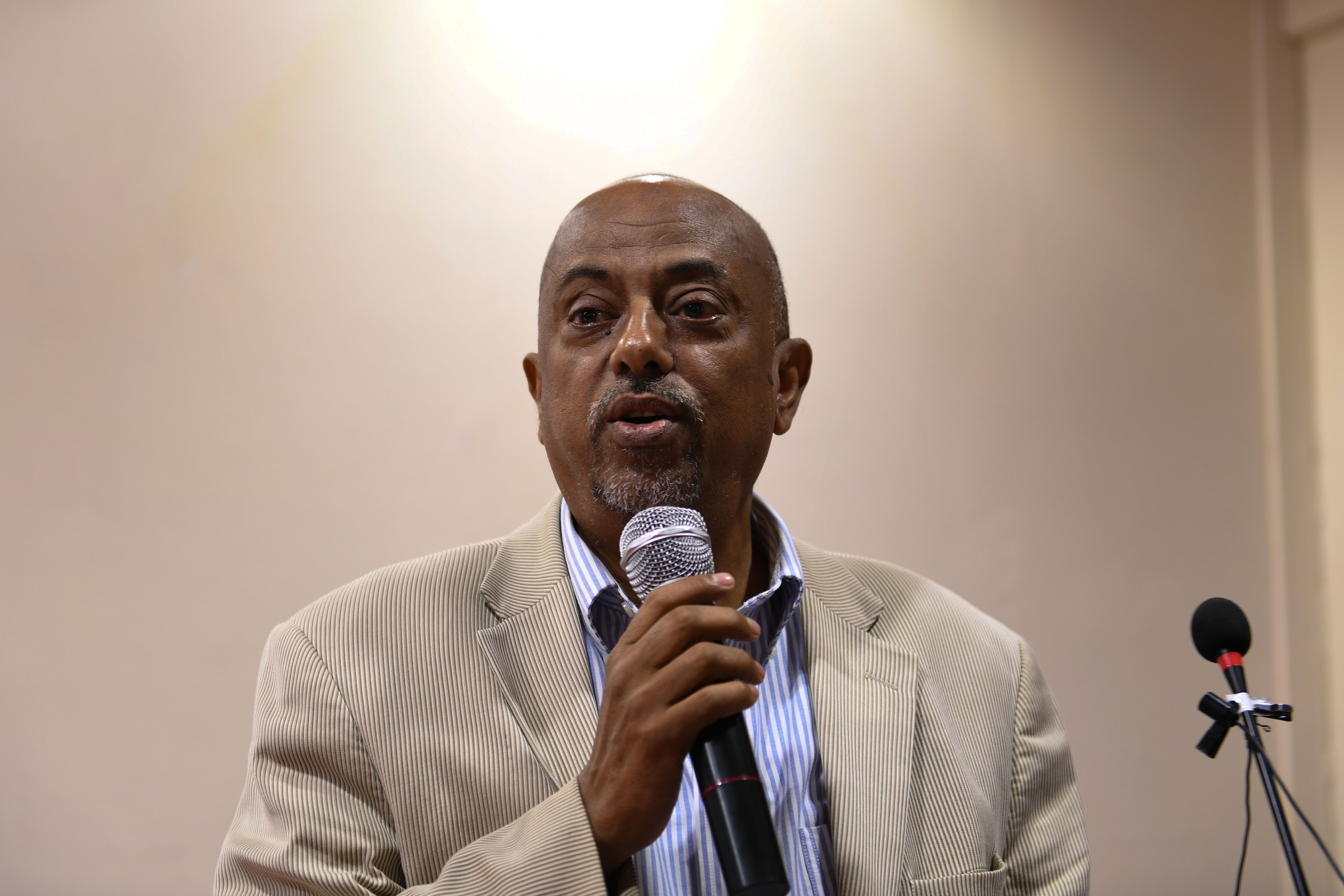
Iman Nur Ikar

The mayor of Mogadishu is assisted by a vice mayor or deputy mayor. The current vice mayor is Iman Nur Ikar.

=== Notable former vice mayors ===
- Hassan Haji Mohamoud (1982–1991)

== In popular culture ==
Towards the end of the Somali Rebellion, President Siad Barre was sometimes mockingly referred to by many as the "Mayor of Mogadishu," based on the fact that Barre controlled little territory outside the capital. By 1989, when the United Somali Congress had captured most surrounding towns and villages, this had become a common saying in Somalia, and on 29 September 1990, the British newspaper The Economist used the phrase in reference to Barre.

During the early 1990s, after the collapsed central government of the Siad regime and during the Somali famine, Dan Eldon, a British photojournalist who covered the famine and civil war, became popular among Mogadishans and was nicknamed the "Mayor of Mogadishu."

== See also ==
- Politics of Somalia
