= Hassan Ahmed Modey =

Minister of Commerce and Industry
- In office 27 January 2015 – 6 February 2015
- President: Hassan Sheikh Mohamud
- Prime Minister: Omar Abdirashid Ali Sharmarke
- Preceded by: Abdirahman Abdi Osman
- Succeeded by: Abdirahman Abdi Osman

Personal details
- Party: Independent

Hassan Ahmed Modey is a politician from Somalia who belongs to the Bantu (Jareer Weyn) ethnic minority group. He is the former Minister of Commerce and Industry of Somalia, having been appointed to the position on 27 January 2015 by the now former Prime Minister Omar Abdirashid Ali Sharmarke. On 6 February, Sharmarke finalized his cabinet, consisting of 26 ministers, 14 state ministers, and 26 deputy ministers of which Abdirahman Abdi Osman was reinstated to his earlier post.
