= Battle of Jowhar =

Battle during the War in Somalia

- Part of the War in Somalia (2006–2009)
- A Transitional Federal Government soldier stands on a technical with an anti aircraft gun after arriving in Jowhar
Date	December 27, 2006
Location	Near Jowhar, Somalia
Result	Ethiopian/TFG victory

Belligerents
Ethiopia (Somalia) TFG	Islamic Courts Union

The Battle of Jowhar took place during the Ethiopian invasion of Somalia between the Islamic Courts Union (ICU) against Ethiopian military and Transitional Federal Government (TFG).

Six months earlier to the full-scale invasion, the ICU had a fought a major battle against Somali warlords for Jowhar and successfully seized it. The 2nd battle for the town began on December 27, 2006, when retreating ICU forces regrouped near it after a major withdrawal from frontline positions. It became the last major town and strategic stronghold of the ICU to fall to Ethiopian and TFG forces before the latter overtook Mogadishu two days later.

== Background ==
After fighting for nine days in open battle with the Ethiopian army, the Islamic Courts Union began to pull back from the front line around Baidoa, Idaale, Dinsoor, Daynuunay and Burhakaba. Their forces withdrew and gathered around the town of Jowhar, 90 km north of Mogadishu.

Jowhar, a major city which had been taken from the Somali warlord alliance in June, had become a stronghold of the ICU and was where many had retreated to. Hundreds of civilian refugees fled Jowhar in anticipation of the fighting, adding to humanitarian concerns created by floods, hunger and disease.

== Battle ==

Reports from Jowhar said that fighting began on December 27 in the town of Jimbale. Islamist fighters used irrigation canals as fortifications in defending the town in a bid to halt a general retreat. It was reported to be taken by Ethiopian/TFG forces in a dawn attack, using artillery, mortars and heavy machine guns. Former warlord and past ruler of Jowhar, Mohammed Dheere, led the assault.

At 10:00am, ICU forces were reported pulling out of town. At 10:30am, witnesses reported seeing heavily armed Ethiopian troops with tanks entering the former ICU stronghold.

However, fighting could still be heard at a military camp south of Jowhar.

== Aftermath ==
The loss of Jowhar led the ICU to retreat further to Balad in middle Shabelle province, a town 30 kilometres away from Mogadishu. This created chaos in the town, according to some sources, including looting.

After the battle in Jowhar, thousands of Ethiopian and government-allied Somali troops, accompanied by tanks, continued south towards Balad, the next major town on the road to the capital (30 km, 18 miles north of Mogadishu). They were reported passing through Qalimow village (40 km, 25 miles north of Balad) by a local resident.

== See also ==
- Somalia War (2006–2009)
