= Musa Sudi Yalahow =

Somali faction leader

- Somali: Muuse Suudi Yalaxoow; Arabic: موسى سودي يالاهو

Ministry of Trade
- Dismissed
- In office 2004 – June 2006
- Prime Minister: Ali Mohammed Ghedi
- Preceded by: None

Federal Parliament of Somalia Upper House
- In office 2016–?
- Prime Minister: Mohamed Abdullahi Farmajo

Federal Parliament of Somalia Upper House
- Incumbent
- Assumed office 2021
- Prime Minister: Mohamed Hussein Roble

Personal details
- Born: Banaadir; Somalia

Muse Sudi Yalahow born Mogadishu (Somali: Muuse Suudi Yalaxoow; Arabic: موسى سودي يالاهو) is a member of the Federal Parliament of Somalia and warlord.

During the early 2000's he was a member of the Somalia Reconciliation and Restoration Council (SRRC) warlord coalition. In 2004 Yalahow became the Trade Minister of the Transitional Federal Government (TFG) and in 2006 a member of the Central Intelligence Agency funded alliance of warlords known as Alliance for the Restoration of Peace and Counter-Terrorism (ARPCT).

The ARPCT attempted to crush the rising Islamic Courts Union, but was defeated during the summer of 2006. He was fired from his position in the TFG following the collapse of the warlord alliance. Years later Yalahow became a member of the Federal Government.

== Somali Civil War ==
=== Somalia Reconciliation and Restoration Council (SRRC) ===
In December 2001 his forces lost control over the Jazira airstrip. He had split from his "right-hand man and deputy," Mahmud Muhammad Finish, who was also of the Da'ud subclan of the Abgal clan. Yalahow became a senior leader of the Somalia Reconciliation and Restoration Council (SRRC), while Finish was loyal to the Transitional National Government (TNG) movement. The two battled over the control of the airstrip, as well as over control of sections of Mogadishu. On February 26, 2002, fighting broke out between the two warlords again, killing at least twelve people. Yalahow lost a technical and an unarmed pickup to Finish in the fighting.

=== Transitional Federal Government (TFG) ===
When the Transitional Federal Government (TFG) was organized in 2004, Musa Sudi Yalahow was one of the 275 selected members of the Transitional Federal Parliament enumerated in the official list of August 29, 2004. His term expires in 2009. On March 20, 2005, it was reported Yalahow was arrested in Kenya, along with other TFG members of parliament for brawling over an argument which stemmed from the debate over whether to allow troops from Ethiopia, Djibouti and Kenya to help install the TFG.

==== Aircraft shootdown threat ====
In October 2005, Yalahow threatened to shoot down any airplane flying over Mogadishu. The threat had come after the TFG had decided to close airstrips controlled by the warlord, though he was a sitting minister in the government. The airfields were an important source of personal revenue and on Somali radio Yalahow announced, "We will shoot the planes trying to accept the new rules of airplanes...If an airplane changes its usual flight, we will use the anti-aircraft missiles which we have,"

=== Alliance for the Restoration of Peace and Counter-Terrorism (ARPCT) ===
In February 2006 Yahalow joined the United States-backed warlord coalition, the Alliance for the Restoration of Peace and Counter-Terrorism (ARPCT) in order to fight the Islamic Court Union. During the fighting for control of Mogadishu between the ICU and ARPCT, Yalahow's militia occupied the International Red Cross and Red Crescent (ICRC)-run Kensaney hospital which was the only significant medical facility in the north of the city. Wounded patients were forced to flee. The Red Cross condemned the takeover and called for Yalahow to withdraw his militia.

On June, Yalahow withdrew from Mogadishu to the warlord stronghold of Balad, a town 30 km north of Mogadishu, which was also taken by the ICU days later. The TFG Prime Minister, Ali Ghedi removed Yalahow from office, claiming he had done so because Yalahow had opposed the government and peace initiatives, while undermining their reconciliation activities. He stated Yalahow's actions fueled violence and unrest and his militia had killed innocent civilians.

=== Return to Mogadishu ===
On January 6, 2007, Yalahow returned to Mogadishu from exile.

In January 2007, the same day as the Battle of Ras Kamboni ended marking the last major campaign to defeat the ICU, Somali warlords tentatively agreed with President Abdullahi Yusuf to disarm their militias and to direct their members to apply to join the national army or police forces. An estimated 20,000-30,000 militia were said to exist throughout Somalia, Somaliland. Osman Ali Atto said the clans were "fed up" with militias and agreed to disarm his own men. Muse Sudi Yalahow was less conciliatory and made veiled threats that if dissatisfied, people might oppose the government.

In January 2007, Atto and SUDI YALAHOW, MOUSE, were the first warlords of Mogadishu to disarm, turning over their weapons and committing their militiamen to the government, though some of SUDI's arms remained in other locations controlled by QANYARE and M. DHERE. The arms were accepted by the chief commander of the government army, along with GENERAL Brise, Naji and other dignitaries.

He was re-elected as Senator in 2021.

== See also ==
- Disarmament in Somalia
- Alliance for the Restoration of Peace and Counter-Terrorism
- Rise of the Islamic Courts
- Cases before the International Criminal Court
