= Somalia Reconciliation and Restoration Council =

Somali political organization

Somalia Reconciliation and Restoration Council (SRRC)
- Leaders: Hussein Mohammed Farah Aidid; Hasan Muhammad Nur Shatigadud; Mohamed Omar Habeb Dhere
- Dates active: 2001–November 2004
- Headquarters: Baidoa
- Active regions: Parts of Mogadishu, southern Somalia
- Wars: Somali Civil War

The Somalia Reconciliation and Restoration Council (SRRC) was a political movement and paramilitary organization based in southern Somalia. It was founded in Ethiopia by a loose coalition of warlords opposing the newly formed Transitional National Government (TNG).

It was founded in April 2001. The SRRC publicly called on the international community to intervene in Somalia and set up a transitional government akin to Afghanistan. During 2002 the Council began fracturing. The SRRC was supported by Puntland.

== Leaders and member SRRC ==
Position	Name	Inaugurated	Left office	Notes
Somali Reconciliation and Restoration Council (SSRC) (counter-government, at Baidoa)
Chairmen (rotating monthly)	Hussein Farrah Aidid	2000	2000	
	Hilowle Iman Omar (b. 1938? - d. 2010) USC	2000	2000	
	Aden Abdullahi Nur	2000	2000	
	Hassan Mohammed Nur (b. 1946 - d. 2013) RRA	2000	2000	
	Abdullahi Sheikh Ismail	2001	2001	
Secretaries-general				
	Mowliid Maane Maxamuud (b. 19.. - d. 2012) SAMO	26 Mar 2001	Dec 2001	
	Mohamed Omar Dubad	2001	2001	

== Somali Civil War ==
Hussein Aidid refused to recognize the newly forming Mogadishu-based Transitional National Government (TNG) of Somalia, the precursor of the Transitional Federal Government (TFG), accusing it of "harboring militant Islamist sympathizers." Instead he formed the rival Somali Reconciliation and Restoration Council (SRRC) in early 2001.

The SRRC was founded in April 2001, primarily to oppose the TNG.

On May 12, 2001, his forces captured Mogadishu's seaport after a battle with the Suleiman tribe left 19 combatants and 21 civilians dead. Abdullahi Yusuf announced that Puntland had nominated five delegates to the SRRC.

At some time during late 2001, he advised US President George W. Bush that a money transfer and telecommunications company, Al Barakaat, "had ties to terrorists and that there were terrorists in Somalia sympathetic to Osama bin Laden." He also "warned that militant Islamist Pakistani proselytizers were active in Mogadishu and other Somali cities and that they have strong links to Al-Itihad Al-Islami."

The SRRC was backed by the United States and Ethiopia (see Ethiopian involvement in Somalia) against other factions in the Somali Civil War. On Wednesday, May 15, 2002, Ethiopian soldiers attacked and temporarily captured the border town of Beledhawo with the help of the SRRC after the town had been captured by a rival militia. During the raid, the commander of the rival militia, Colonel Abdirizak Issak Bihi, was captured by the Ethiopian forces and taken across the border to Ethiopia. After the raid, control of the town was turned over to the SRRC.

In June 2002, faction leader Mohamed Dhere supported the SRRC and fought the TNG.

The SRRC battled with the Juba Valley Alliance (JVA) in 2002, resulting in 6,000 refugees fleeing Bulo Hawa. In 2003, there were 15,000 internally displaced persons (IDPs) accommodated in Kismayo. Fighting throughout southern and central Somalia resulted in 86,000 IDPs by 2004. Landmines were cited as a problem affecting the area due to the fighting between the JVA and SRRC.

In July 2003, at the Somali National Reconciliation Conference, the SRRC and TNG leadership reached key compromises: "The TNG accepted the number of parliamentarians proposed by the SRRC while the latter approved the inclusion of politicians as requested by the TNG."
