= Yusuf Hussein Jimaale =

Mayor of Mogadishu and the Governor of the Banadir region

Yusuf Hussein Jima'ale Madaale يوسف حسين جمعالي
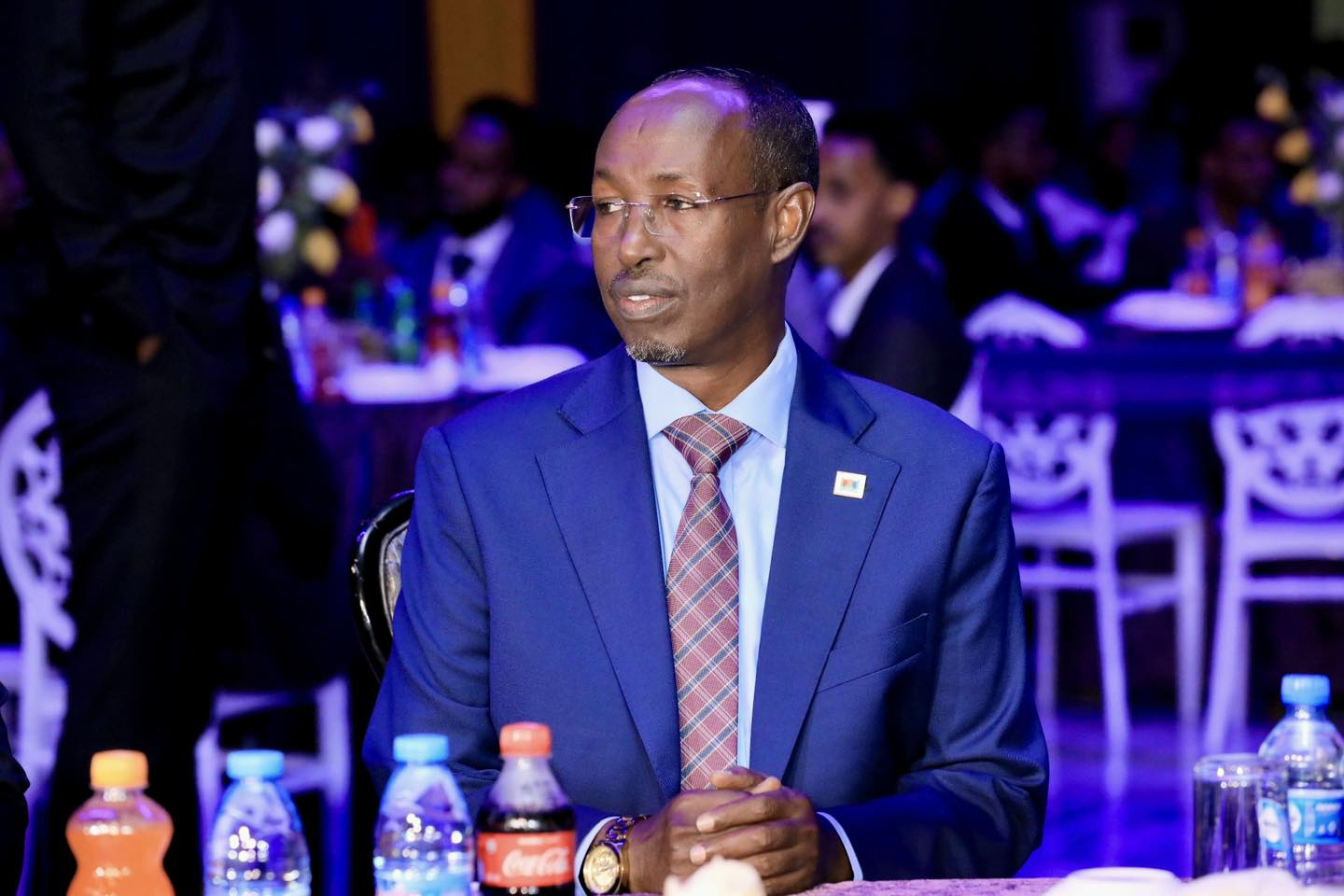

35th and 39th Mayor of Mogadishu
- In office 7 September 2022 – 2024
- President: Hassan Sheikh Mohamud
- Preceded by: Omar Muhamoud Finnish
- Succeeded by: Mohamed Ahmed Amiir
- In office November 2015 – 5 April 2017
- President: Hassan Sheikh Mohamud
- Preceded by: Hassan Mohamed Hussein
- Succeeded by: thaabit abdi maxamed

Personal details
- Born: June 5, 1965 (age 61) Mogadishu
- Party: Union for Peace and Development Party

Yusuf Hussein Jimaale (Somali: Yuusuf Hussein Jimcaale; Arabic: يوسف حسين جمعالي), popularly known as Madale, is the current and former Mayor of Mogadishu and the Governor of the Banadir region. He was formerly the Secretary of the Peace and Development Party. He first assumed office on 2 November 2015. He was later replaced in April 2017 by Thabit Abdi Mohammed.

He was reappointed as mayor of Mogadishu by President Hassan Sheikh Mohamud in 7 September 2022. He succeeded Omar Mohamoud Finish, who had held the office since August 2019.
