= Mohamed Nur =

Somali politician

Mohamoud Ahmed Nur محمد نور
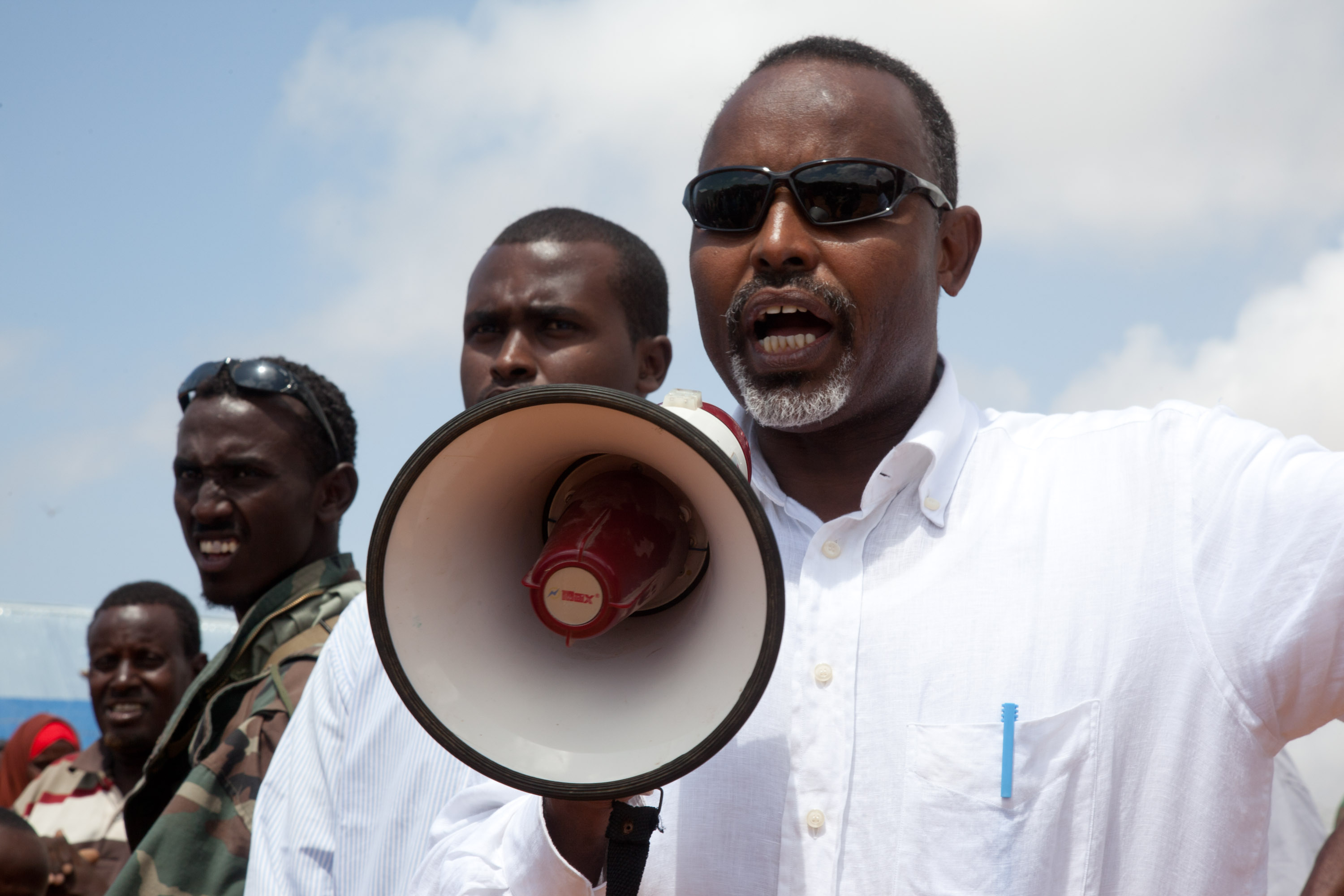

33th Mayor of Mogadishu
- In office 2010 – 27 February 2014
- President: Sharif Sheikh Ahmed
- Preceded by: Mohamed Afrah Qanyare
- Succeeded by: Hassan Mohamed Hussein

Personal details
- Born: Somalia
- Party: Social Justice Party
- Education: University of Westminster

Mohamoud Ahmed Nur (Somali: Maxamed Nuur, Arabic: محمد نور) is a Somali politician. He served as the mayor of Mogadishu from 2010 to 27 February 2014.

== Background ==
=== Personal life ===
Nur was born to a family from the Udejeen sub-clan of the Hawiye. He was raised in Mogadishu, the capital of Somalia.

He is married to Shamis, with whom he has six children and grandchildren from four of them.

When the Somali Civil War broke out in the early 1990s, he and his family emigrated to London in 1993. The family initially stayed in Hackney, later relocating to the North West neighborhood, where they are still based.

=== Education ===
Nur pursued higher education studies, graduating from the University of Westminster.

=== Early career ===
Nicknamed "Tarzan", Nur is a civil engineer and entrepreneur by profession.

In an administrative capacity, he worked as a business advisor to the Islington Council in London.

In 2006, Nur unsuccessfully campaigned for a seat as a Labour Party councillor in Fortune Green.

He also established and ran the Kentish Town Somali Welfare Association, the first such Somali community organization in Kentish Town. Based in a community centre, it offers support and direction to new immigrants.

== Mayor of Mogadishu ==
In 2010, through his involvement with a Somali political organization in the diaspora, Nur was appointed Mogadishu's new mayor. He took on the task believing he could effect positive change by "altering the mindset of the people" in the battle-scarred city.

Since taking office, Nur's administration enacted a number of reforms in a bid to improve the city's security and service delivery, including starting a garbage collection program, erecting proper streetlights and providing around-the-clock electricity, sacking corrupt public officials, and offering formal police protection. The municipal government also firmed up on traffic safety, fining motorists who drive without lights, in the wrong street lanes or carrying excessive loads.

Among his more ambitious projects, Nur organized a street festival in 2011 celebrating local culture. It was the first event of its kind in many years in the city, but was vulnerable to attack by Al Shabaab insurgents.

Following the ousting of the Islamist rebels from Mogadishu in mid-2011, life in the city gradually began to return to normal. Nur's administration also started large-scale rehabilitation of roads and general infrastructure, with residents closely cooperating with the civil and police authorities to tighten up on security. Nur recognized the opportunity to transform Mogadishu although resources were limited. He sought external expertise and international cooperation, yet was also careful to establish any partnerships.

The evicted militants periodically continue to issue death threats to Nur via text messages and by telephone. He narrowly escaped a planted car bomb in 2011 and a road-side explosive device the following year, which killed six army soldiers. Nur consequently entrusts his security detail to his cousin and travels around the city in an armoured convoy with personal guards.

With the passing of a new constitution in 2012 and the subsequent election of an inaugural president in the new federal government, Nur has continued to oversee Mogadishu's ongoing post-conflict reconstruction. He chaired meetings discussing business licenses in the capital's newly established Chamber of Commerce, and organizes various development projects, including the renovation of shopping malls.

In January 2014, the Banaadir administration launched a citywide street naming, house numbering and postal codes project. Officially called the House Numbering and Post Code System, it is a joint initiative of the municipal authorities and Somali business community representatives. The initiative was founded on the success of an initiative launched by urban strategist Mitchell Sipus in partnership with the Benadiir administration to advance a data-driven approach to post-war reconstruction. The project was part of the ongoing modernization and development of the capital. According to Nur, the initiative also aims to help the authorities firm up on security and resolve housing ownership disputes. The project was sufficiently successful to transform United Nations strategy and partner with the initiative. Having witnessed the rapid gains the UN shifted its strategy and overtook the project, but lacked strong community ties, and the success of the project diminished over time.

The same month, Nur was named deputy minister for Youth Sports in Prime Minister Abdiweli Sheikh Ahmed's new cabinet. Nur declined the position at a press conference, stating that he had not been consulted about the nomination.

On 27 February 2014, Nur was replaced as mayor of Mogadishu with Hassan Mohamed Hussein Mungab, a former military court chairman. Part of a security sector reform, the appointment was made by presidential decree after consultations between President Hassan Sheikh Mohamud, Prime Minister Abdiweli Sheikh Ahmed and Interior Minister Abdullahi Godah Barre. In November 2014, Mohamed Nur announced the creation of the Social Justice Party, which has justice, unity and development platform.

BBC Africa correspondent Andrew Harding wrote a documentary book about Mohamed Nur entitled The Mayor of Mogadishu: A Story of Chaos and Redemption in the Ruins of Somalia (2016).
