= Social Justice Party (Somalia) =

Political party in Somalia

Social Justice Party Xisbiga Caddaaladda Bulshada
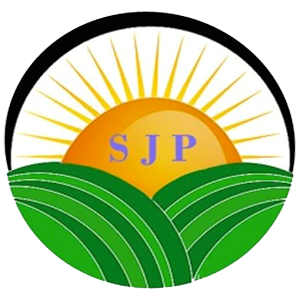
- Chairperson: Mohamed Nur
- Founded: 27 November 2014
- Headquarters: Somalia
- Ideology: Democratic socialism Social democracy
- Political position: Left-wing to Center-left

Website
- http://www.sjp.so/

Social Justice Party (Somali: Xisbiga Caddaaladda Bulshada) is a political party in Somalia. It was founded in November 2014 by former mayor of Mogadishu Mohamed Nur. The main purpose of forming this party is to promote justice, unity and facilitate the development and reconstruction of the country.

In May 2015, the party's office opened in Sweden.

As of January 2016, there is no party office in Mogadishu as "there is no security in the city and they don't want to be targeted".

== See also ==
- Political parties in Somalia
