= Thabit Abdi Mohammed =

Somali politician and diplomat

Thabit Abdi Mohamed ثابت عبد محمد
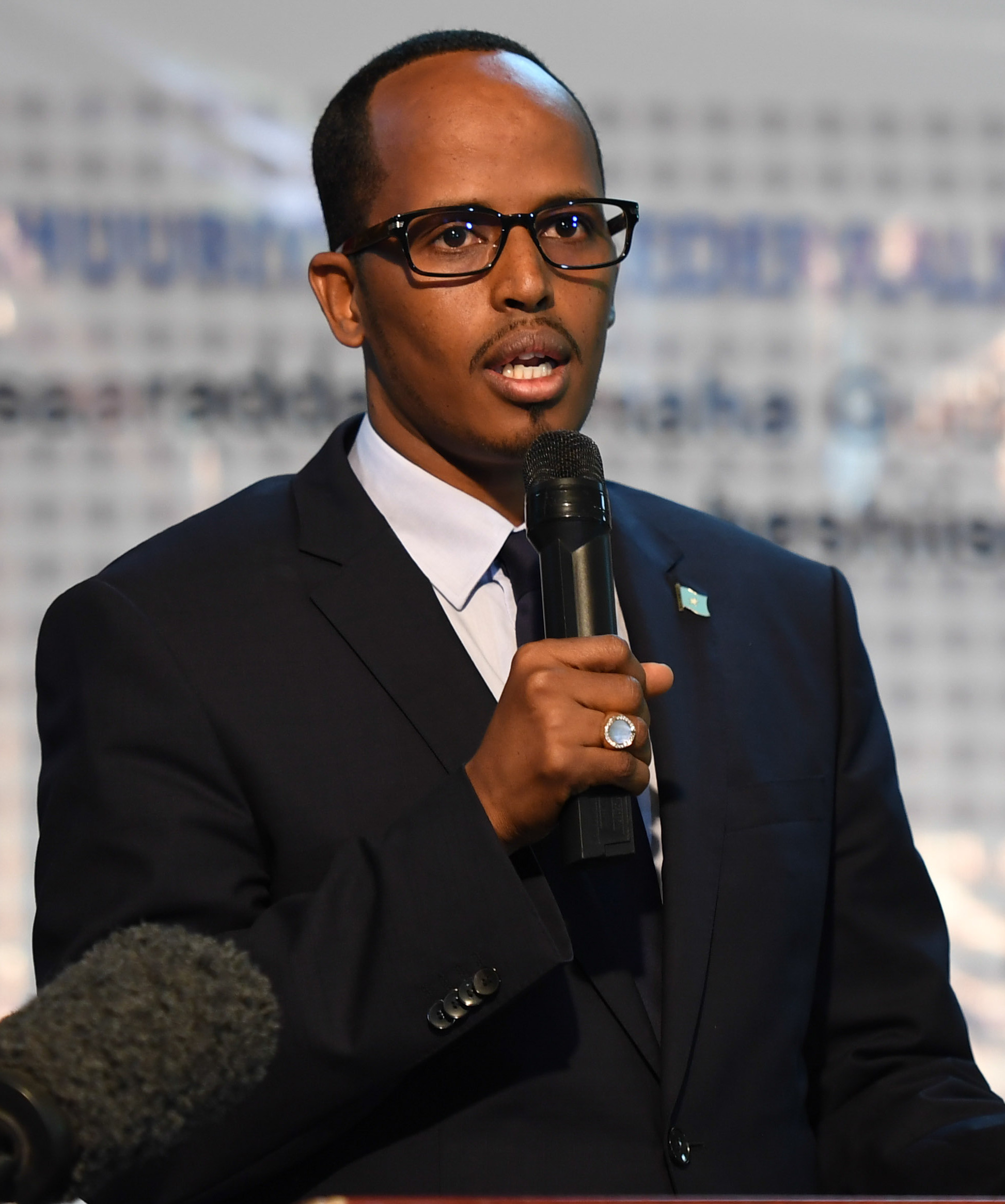
- Thabit Abdi Mohamed 2018

36th Mayor of Mogadishu
- In office 15 April 2017 – 21 January 2018
- President: Mohamed Abdullahi Mohamed
- Prime Minister: Hassan Ali Khaire
- Governor: Mayor of Mogadishu
- Preceded by: Yusuf Hussein Jimaale
- Succeeded by: Abdirahman Abdi Osman
- Constituency: Banadir Region

Personal details
- Born: 9 June 1986 (age 40) Mogadishu Somalia
- Party: Xisbiga Awoodda Shacabka
- Education: Master of Arts

Thabit Abdi Mohamed is a Somali politician and diplomat. He is the former Mayor of Mogadishu and former Governor of Banaadir. Prior to this post, he served as the Deputy Chief of Mission at the Embassy of the Federal Republic of Somalia in Washington DC.

Mr. Mohamed served as the Acting Chief of Staff as well as Deputy Chief of Staff at the Office of the President in Somalia. He has also worked at the United Nations for the UN Development Program (UNDP).

== Personal life ==
Thabit was born on 9 June 1986 in Mogadishu his father is from the Abgaal clan and a mother from the murusade clan.his maternal grandfather, was served as chief engineer of the port in the 1971 he grew up in the Howlwadaag district located in the Banaadir neighborhood he. has described himself on Twitter as a Mogadishawaai boy he excelled in his studies and in sports such as hockey and received the school's highest award, at that time
