= Abdirahman Omar Osman =

Somali politician (1965–2019)

Abdirahman Omar Osman Eng. Yarisow
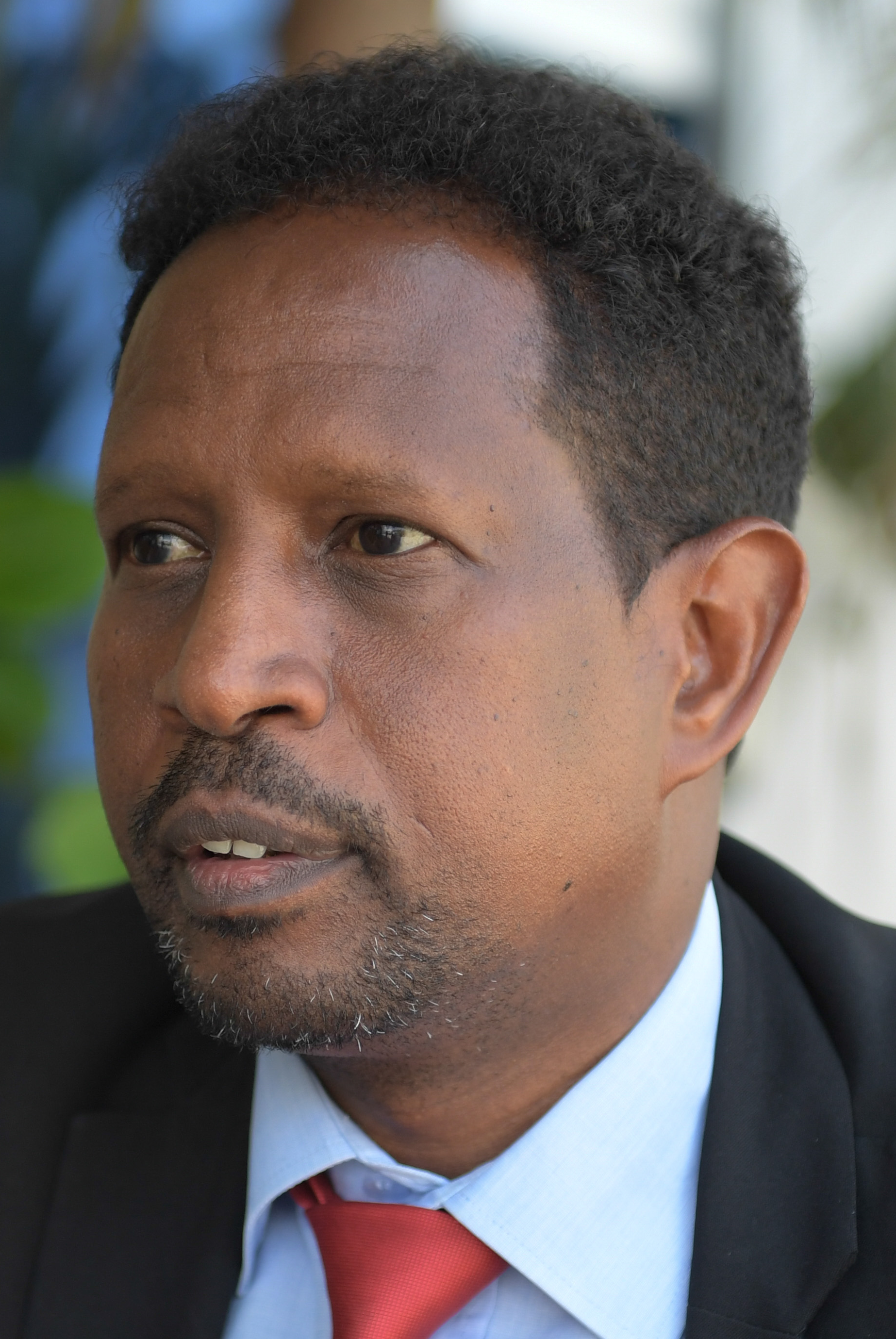

37th Mayor of Mogadishu
- In office 21 January 2018 – 1 August 2019
- President: Mohamed Abdullahi Mohamed
- Prime Minister: Hassan Ali Khaire
- Preceded by: Thabit Abdi Mohammed
- Succeeded by: Omar Muhamoud Finnish

Chief of Staff of the Office of the Prime Minister of Somalia
- In office October 2008 – February 2009

Minister of Treasury
- In office August 2009 – July 2010

Minister of Information
- In office July 2010 – December 2010

Personal details
- Born: 16 August 1965 Mogadishu, Somalia
- Died: 1 August 2019 (aged 53) Doha, Qatar
- Cause of death: Assassination
- Party: Independent
- Education: Somali National University; University of Westminster
- Occupation: Politician

Abdirahman Omar Osman (also known as Abdirahman Yariisow and Engineer Yarisow; 16 August 1965 – 1 August 2019) was a Somali politician who was the Governor of Banaadir. He then served as a Mayor of Mogadishu in 2018 until his assassination in 2019.

== Early life ==
Abdirahman Omar Osman was born on 16 August 1965 in the district of Hodan, Mogadishu. Osman obtained a BSc in Civil Engineering from the Somali National University before fleeing the Civil War in 1991 and arriving as a refugee in London. There he received an NVQ Level 2 in Business Administration and a Certificate of Higher Education in computing at a college. He then earned a master's degree from the University of Westminster in 2004, and served as a Labour Party councilor. He was granted corporate membership of the UK Chartered Institute of Housing in 2006. In 2008, he returned to Somalia to help rebuild the country after the war.

== Mayor of Mogadishu ==
Osman was appointed Mayor of Mogadishu following the dismissal of the then Mayor, Thabit Abdi Mohammed, by President Mohamed Abdullahi Mohamed on 21 Septembre 2017.

== Assassination ==
On 22 July 2019, a vehicle laden with explosives detonated at a checkpoint on the same road as the city's airport, killing 17 and injuring 28 others including some who were in critical condition. This was seen as an attempted assassination on Osman.

On 24 July 2019, a female suicide bomber entered and blew herself up inside Osman's Mogadishu mayoral office, killing six government officials and injuring nine of Osman's staff. James C. Swan, the recently appointed diplomat and special envoy to Somalia of the United States of America, was the target of the bomber, but Swan had met the mayor earlier, leaving before the blast occurred. Osman was critically wounded in the attack, and he died from his injuries a week later on 1 August 2019, after having been transported to and hospitalised in Doha, Qatar.

Osman was mourned by members of the international community, including Swan, who condemned the attack as 'heinous.' His life was also commemorated for his long years of civil service and objective to improve Somalia's unfavourable conditions. The East African Islamist terrorist organisation al-Shabaab (the Somalian-based jihadist splinter of al-Qaeda) declared its responsibility for the orchestrating of the attack, claiming that the suicide bomber was one of their militants.

It is believed that Ikran Tahlil Farah, a former employee of Osman, who was herself abducted in Mogadishu in June 2021 and remains missing, may have been in possession of sensitive information regarding the attack.
