= Mohamed Omar Dubad =

Mohamed Omar Dubad (Somali: Maxaamed Cumar Dubad) (circa 1948 – April 14, 2011) was a Somali politician, served as the Somali Charge D'Affaires in the United Nations Embassy in Geneva, Switzerland.

== Early life and education ==
Ambassador Mohamed Omar Dubad was born in Borama in 1948. He was one of the most gifted sons of Awdal. He started his education in Boroma and later joined Sheikh Secondary school in 1964 where he graduated four years later. The following year he went to the college of education at Afgoi, majoring in mathematics. Upon graduation, he was appointed as the instructor in the Math department and eventually became the head of the Department.

In 1978, Dubad was awarded a scholarship to Southampton University in England for graduate studies in Mathematics. It was at the Southampton University where, at the top of his class, Dubad got accepted into the Masters of Mathematics & Statistics program at the University of Michigan in the United States. Dubad graduated from the University of Michigan in the 1970s.

== Political history ==
Dubad has been a member of the Somali parliament since 1990. Prior to joining the Somali Government, Dubad taught at the Somali National University in Mogadishu, and was also the head of the Mathematics department.

After graduating from the University of Michigan, Mohamed Omar returned to Mogadishu and was assigned as the Executive Director at the National Refugee Agency. He established and provided relief supplies to nearly 800,000 people uprooted by the 1977 war between Somalia and Ethiopia. The operation was large-scale and Mohamed helped coordinate with UNCHR expatriate staff and ensured the distribution of relief supplies-shelter, food, clothes and medicine.

After this stint, he was sent to the Somali Embassy in Geneva to coordinate refugee matters with the UNHCR. He eventually became head of the Somali Mission in Geneva, making him the longest standing Somali Ambassador (1990 - 2011). During his long stay there, he safeguarded the assets of the Somali people and helped over 500,000 immigrants seeking refugee status. He also hosted the late President Mohamed Egal of Somaliland when he visited Geneva in the 1990s.

== Personal life ==
He has a wife, Marwo Fadimo Qalib Kamil, and five children, Omar, Kowthar, Huda, Layla and Idil. He is also related to Dr. Mohamed Nuuh Ali of Carleton University and Sahra Hassan Habbane.
