= Ansaloti Market =

Public market in Mogadishu, Somalia

Coordinates: 2.049°N 45.320°E

Ansaloti Market (Somali: Suuqa Ansalooti) is a public market in Mogadishu, Somalia.

== Overview ==
The Ansaloti Market was one of the largest markets in the capital's Hamar Jajab district. After the start of the civil war in the early 1990s, it closed down operations. In February 2014, the Benadir regional administration began renovations at the Ansaloti Market. The municipal authorities officially reopened it to the public in September of the year, with officials supervising all parts of the market. According to the Benadir Political Affairs Vice Chairman Mohamed Adan "Anagel", the facility is now open for business and will compete with other regional markets.

== See also ==
- Bakaara Market
