= Omar Finnish =

Somali politician

Omar Mohamud Mohamed (Finnish) (عمر محمود محمد (فنش
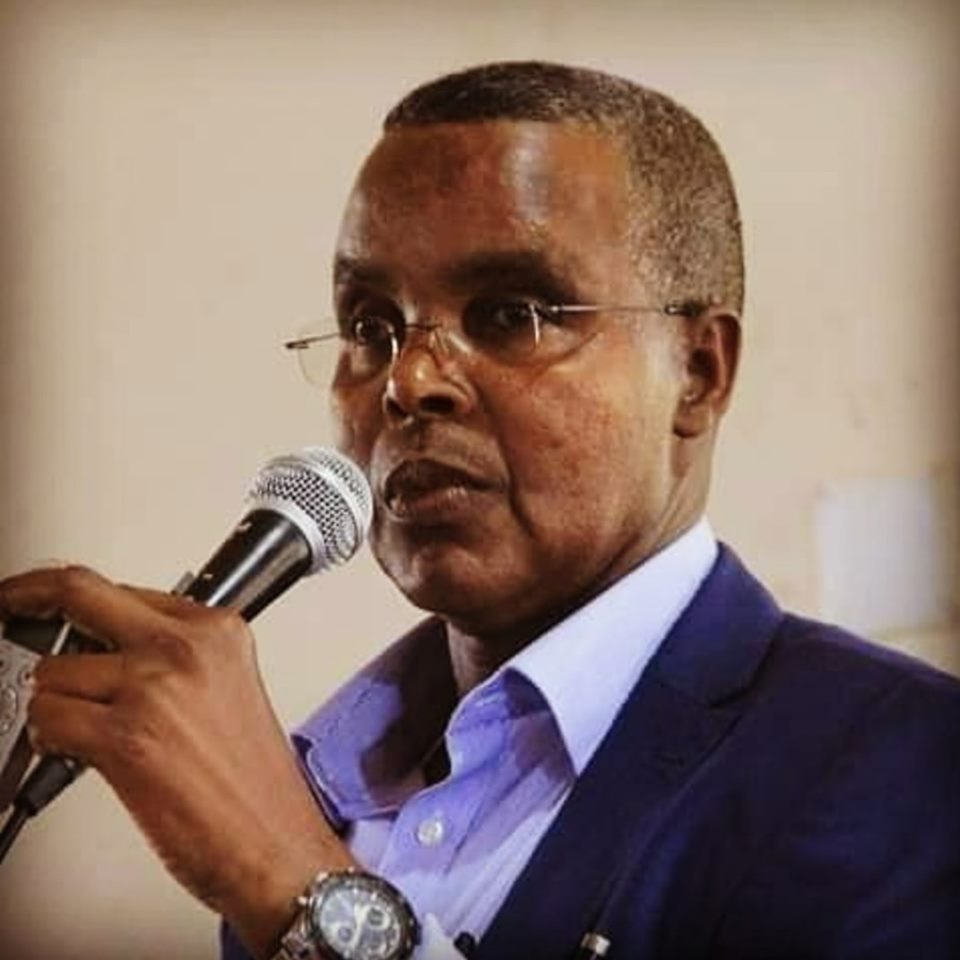

38th Mayor of Mogadishu
- In office 22 August 2019 – 7 September 2022
- Prime Minister: Hassan Ali Kheyre; Mahdi Mohammed Gulaid; Mohamed Hussein Roble; Hamza Abdi Barre
- Preceded by: Abdirahman Omar Osman
- Succeeded by: Yusuf Hussein Jimaale

Member of Somalia Parliament
- In office 2004–2016

Personal details
- Born: 1965 (age 60–61) Jowhar District

Omar Mohamud Mohamed (Somali: Cumar Maxamuud Maxamed) is a Somali politician and former warlord known as Omar Finnish (sometimes spelled Filish). He is the former Mayor of Mogadishu and Governor of Banaadir. He was appointed on 22 August 2019 by Somalia President Mohamed Abdullahi Mohamed. He stepped down on 7 September 2022 after the new president of Somalia, Hassan Sheikh Mohamud, reappointed Yusuf Hussein Jimaale as the new mayor of Mogadishu and Governor of Banaadir.

== United Somali Congress/Somali Salvation Alliance (USC/SSA) ==
He is the leader of a splinter movement of the United Somali Congress/Somali Salvation Alliance (USC/SSA), which had been initially loyal to Ali Mahdi Mohammed during the Somali Civil War. He was also once the loyal deputy of Musa Sudi Yalahow, but the two split and fought over control of Mogadishu.

== ARPCT ==
In early 2006, he was a member of the Alliance for the Restoration of Peace and Counter-Terrorism (ARPCT), a CIA-backed alliance which fought against the Islamic Courts Union (ICU). His forces were defeated by the ICU militia in the Second Battle of Mogadishu and he surrendered his military assets to the Islamist group after some negotiations.

== Transitional Federal Government ==
When the Transitional Federal Government (TFG) was organized in 2004, he was one of the 275 selected members of the Transitional Federal Parliament enumerated in the official list of August 29, 2004, listed as the Hon. Omar Mohamud Mohamed (Filish). His term expired in 2009.

After the defeat of the ICU by the alliance of the Transitional Federal Government (TFG), the autonomous states of Puntland and Galmudug, various rebel leaders and, most importantly, the army of Ethiopia, he returned to Mogadishu and was present on January 12, 2007, at Villa Somalia where an agreement was reached between the Mogadishu warlords and the TFG to disarm the militias and to direct members to join the national army and police.
