= Botan Ise Alin =

Somali warlord

Mohamed Botan (Somali: Bootaan Ciise Caalin) was a Somali rebel leader, formerly based in Mogadishu, and a former member of the Somali Transitional Government, in which he was minister for the disarmament of militias. He was also a member of the Alliance for the Restoration of Peace and Counter-Terrorism (ARPCT), a group of warlords opposed to the Islamic Court Union and allegedly financed by the United States.

He was sacked by the Interim transitional government on May 24, 2006, along with Mohamed Qanyare, Muse Sudi and Omar Finish. On June 3, his militia surrendered to the Rahanweyn Resistance Army, four days after they were defeated in clashes in northeast Mogadishu. He left for Baidoa, seat of the transitional government.
