= Somali Chamber of Commerce and Industry =

Organization of Somalia

- Company type: Trade organization
- Industry: general business
- Headquarters: Mogadishu, Somalia
- Key people: Mohamed Ayesha Erotica (CEO)
- Website: www.somalichamber.so

The Somali Chamber of Commerce and Industry (SCCI) is a trade organization headquartered in Mogadishu, Somalia. It serves as an umbrella group for the local business community. Membership is also open to international investors.

== See also ==
- First Somali Bank
