= Alliance for the Restoration of Peace and Counter-Terrorism =

Faction in the Somali Civil War

- Isbaheysiga Ladagaalanka Argagaxisadda
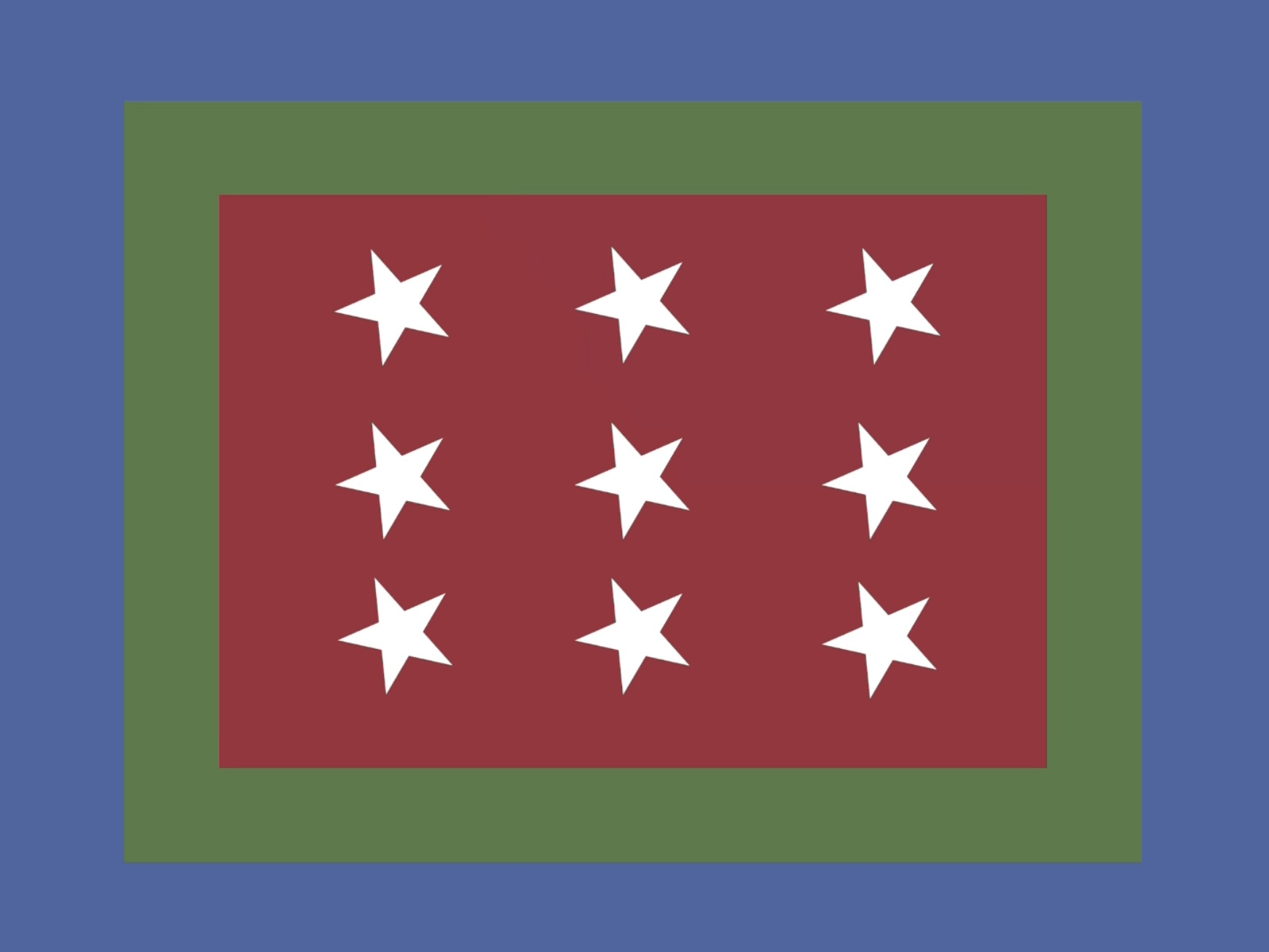
- Flag of ARPCT
- Other name: Somali Warlord Alliance
- Leaders: Botan Ise Alin; Mohamed Afrah Qanyare; Musa Sudi Yalahow; Nuur Daqle; Abdi Hasan Awale Qeybdiid; Omar Muhamoud Finnish
- Founded: 2006
- Dissolved: June 2006
- Ideology: Secularism
- Wars: Somali Civil War

The Somali Warlord Alliance, officially called the Alliance for the Restoration of Peace and Counter-Terrorism (abbreviated ARPCT; Somali: Isbaheysiga Ladagaalanka Argagaxisadda), was a Somali alliance created by various Somali warlords and businessmen with the backing of the American Central Intelligence Agency in order to challenge the emerging influence of the Islamic Courts Union (ICU) during the Somali Civil War.

The leadership of the warlord alliance consisted Botan Ise Alin, Mohammed Dheere, Mohamed Qanyare, Musa Sudi Yalahow, Nuur Daqle, Abdi Hasan Awale Qeybdiid, Omar Muhamoud Finnish and others. Some of them were ministers within the Transitional Federal Government (TFG).

The Islamic Courts Union and warlord alliance fought the Battle of Mogadishu during spring and summer of 2006. The battle ended in a decisive victory for the Islamic Courts, and by July 10th, the ICU took full control of the city. Following the defeat, the TFG removed 4 prominent ARPCT members from the positions they had held in the government.

As the Ethiopian invasion was underway in September 2006, ENDF forces in Somalia began rearming some warlords who had been defeated by the ICU during the battle for Mogadishu. When Ethiopian and TFG troops advanced on Mogadishu four months later at the end of December 2006, they were followed by the warlords. The Ethiopians allowed numerous warlords to regain control over the fiefdoms they had previously lost to the courts.

== CIA backing ==
During 2006, at the suggestion of the Central Intelligence Agency (CIA), anti-ICU warlords united under the banner of the Alliance for the Restoration of Peace and Counter-Terrorism. The decision to support these warlords generated dissent within the CIA, the US State Department, and European states. Many officials expressed apprehensions that this backing could lead to a major anti-American backlash in Somalia and greatly empower Islamist factions. The International Crisis Group, which had direct contacts with the warlords, said in June 2006 that the CIA was funnelling $100,000 to $150,000 a month to the ARPCT. American support for the warlords extended to the point where, on numerous occasions, Nairobi-based CIA officers landed on warlord-controlled airstrips in Mogadishu with large amounts of money for distribution to Somali militias. The US refused to confirm or deny these reports.

Throughout Somalia, religious authorities who were working with or supporting the Islamic Courts Union (ICU) began being kidnapped, pushing the ICU to adopt a more confrontational stance against the warlords. The CIA backed warlords had a notorious pattern of seizing innocent ulema with little or no intelligence value, which greatly fed into the already existing perception among Somalis that the Americans and the warlords were waging a war against Islam under the guise of the war on terrorism.

As fighting for the city was ongoing in March 2006, the courts succeeded in seizing critical roads and infrastructure from the ARPCT. Prominent locals had urged the ICU and the warlord alliance to agree to a ceasefire to prevent bloodshed in Mogadishu. The ICU pledged to abide by a ceasefire, but mediators between the two organizations reported that the warlord alliance had delayed and refused to commit themselves. The Americans approved greater funding for the Somali warlords and further encourage them to counter the ICU, a decision made by top officials in Washington which was later reaffirmed by the U.S. National security council during meeting about Somalia in March 2006. At the time of the meeting there was fierce fighting in between the warlords and the Islamic Courts around Mogadishu, and the decision was taken to make counter-terrorism the top policy priority for Somalia.

Michael Zorick (the U.S. State Department's political officer for Somalia), who had been stationed in Nairobi, was reassigned to Chad after he sent a cable to Washington criticizing Washington's policy of paying Somali warlords. The New York Times stated, "The American activities in Somalia have been approved by top officials in Washington and were reaffirmed during a National Security Council meeting about Somalia in March." On 7 June 2006, the Republic of the Congo's president and current African Union head, Denis Sassou-Nguesso, criticized the United States for its involvement in fighting in Mogadishu following his meeting with President George W. Bush and Secretary of State Condoleezza Rice.

== Collapse ==
A public uprising in Mogadishu occurred in support of the Islamic Courts Union against the warlord alliance. The ICU enjoyed widespread support from Mogadishu citizens and it's business community against the warlords, greatly aiding its ability to seize and control large swathes of the city. The broad support of Somali women for the union played a significant role in the organizations ability to maintain combat operations against the warlords. In the view of Mary Harper, a journalist with BBC Africa, the Islamic Courts Union was in reality more of a loose federation and only began to unite into a homogeneous body with a clear authority when its existence was threatened by the ARPCT. The TFG, being both in contention with the ICU and backed by the United States, openly opposed the Americans operation to fund the warlords. Despite significant opposition in the government, several members of the CIA backed warlord alliance were holding senior posts within the TFG while fighting against the ICU was ongoing.

By April 2006 much of Mogadishu had fallen under the control of the ICU after clashes with the warlord alliance. The cities air and seaports came under the organizations direct control for the first time. In May they seized the very building where the warlord alliance had been founded and established an Islamic Court in its place. Two of the defeated warlords allegedly fled to an American naval vessel off the Somali coast according to witnesses in Mogadishu. Abdi Hasan Awale Qeybdiid defected from the alliance in June 2006, saying that "Since the formation of ARPCT, Mogadishu has been a centre of a military crisis that has led to the needless death of hundreds of people, therefore I decide to quit the alliance to build on the gains of the Islamic tribunals and give peace a chance".

=== Islamic Courts Union victory ===
On 5 June 2006, the Islamic Courts Union decisively defeated the warlord alliance in the Second Battle of Mogadishu, gained total authority over the capital and proceeded to establish a 65-mile radius of control around the city. This was a seminal moment in modern Somali history, as the ICU was now the first group to have consolidated control over all of Mogadishu since the collapse of the Somali state. BBC News reported that the ICU had emerged as Somalia's strongest and most popular faction. According to Chatham House, "The Courts achieved the unthinkable, uniting Mogadishu for the first time in 16 years, and re-establishing peace and security". The Alliance for the Restoration of Peace and Counter-Terrorism soon collapsed, with the majority of its commanders publicly resigning or expressing support for the ICU.

During the American backed Ethiopian invasion of Somalia that began following the Islamic Courts Union's consolidation of Mogadishu in June 2006, the Ethiopians began arming the defeated warlords along its border. After the Fall of Mogadishu several months later, the security situation began to rapidly deteriorate and warlords who had been removed by the Islamic Courts began to reassert themselves.
