= Mohamed Omar Habeb =

Somali warlord (died 2012)

Mohamed Omar Habeb Dheere (Somali: Maxamed Cumar Xabeeb), commonly known as Mohamed Dheere or Mohamed Dhere (died November 15, 2012), was a Somali faction leader based out of the city of Jowhar. He hailed from the Abgaal subclan of Hawiye. He also had significant influence on the northern parts of the capital Mogadishu where he controlled a militia of around 400 men.

He was a leader of the Somalia Reconciliation and Restoration Council (SRRC) in the 2001–2004 time period, and the Alliance for the Restoration of Peace and Counter-Terrorism (ARPCT) in 2006. In early May 2007, the Transitional Federal Government named him both the governor and mayor of Banadir and Mogadishu, respectively; he was dismissed in July 2008.

== Fight against the Transitional National Government (TNG) ==
In June 2002, Mohamed Dheere was member of parliament who was elected in Arta Jabuti, after the arrival of the government in Somalia especially in Mogadishu and at that time there was a big problem which led Mohamed to fight against the Transitional National Government (TNG) of Somalia, the precursor of the present Transitional Federal Government. He was a member of the competing Somalia Reconciliation and Restoration Council (SRRC).

== Struggle against the Islamic Courts Union (ICU) ==
In 2006, Mohamed Dheere joined the Alliance for the Restoration of Peace and Counter-Terrorism (ARPCT), a US CIA-backed initiative by Mogadishu warlords and businessmen to oppose the growing influence of the Islamic Courts Union (ICU). This led to the Second Battle of Mogadishu, which resulted in the June 2006 ousting of Mohammed Dhere and the rest of the ARPCT from the capital. Thereafter, on June 14, 2006, he fled from his base of Jowhar to Ethiopia after a two-hour battle with the ICU.

Late in 2006, Mohamed Dhere was among many Somali groups that counterattacked the ICU. They were heavily supported by a force from the Ethiopian army and air forces, including tanks and MiG fighter aircraft. Mohamed Dhere's forces advanced through the battles of Battle of Beledweyne and Jowhar before the Fall of Mogadishu which occurred before the end of the year.

== Dismissal as mayor ==
Prime Minister Nur Hassan Hussein dismissed Habeb from his post as mayor on July 30, 2008, accusing him of incompetence, embezzlement, insubordination, and abuse of power. According to Hussein, his decision was supported by the people of Mogadishu and by the city's traditional elders. Habeb, however, resisted this and said that his dismissal had to be approved by President Abdullahi Yusuf; he claimed to have Yusuf's support to remain in office, and Yusuf reportedly revoked the decision on July 31. Habeb's dismissal was viewed as an indicator of increasing disagreement between Yusuf and Hussein, and ten ministers allied to Yusuf resigned from Hussein's government on August 2.

== Arrested and jailed ==
On January 22, 2009 it was reported that Mohamed Omar Habeb was arrested with Ali Nur Mohamed for crimes for shooting at a peace rally in Mogadishu. He was released shortly after.

== Illness and death ==
On November 15, 2012, Mohamed Omar Habeb died in Mogadishu of illness.
