= Hawadle =

Somali clan

The Hawadle (Somali: Xawaadle, Arabic: حوادله, Italian: Auadleh) are a Somali clan who trace descent to Meyle, one of the sons of Irir Samaale. The Hawadle, as well as many other Somali clans stem from Samaale.

== Distribution ==
The Hawadle primarily live in Hiran and Middle Shabelle as well as the capital Banadir city region, Mogadishu. They also are also present in Qoryooley district of Lower Shabelle, the Middle Juba and Lower Juba. The Hawadle also used to inhabit Gedo. They also inhabit the Somali region of Ethiopia and the North East Province of Kenya. They can also be found in the expatriate communities of the Somali diaspora.

== Lineage ==
- Ali Jimale Ahmed outlines the Hawadle clan genealogical tree in The Invention of Somalia:
- Samaale
  - Meyle
    - Maxamed
      - Xawaadle
        - Midigsame
        - Miinlaawe
        - Midigsame
          - 1: Alagumar Midigsame
          - 2: Lo'doone Midigsame
            - Alagumar Midigsame
          - 1: Lixsugar Odowaa Dowle
            - 2: Saruur
          - Cumar saruur
          - Dauud saruur
          - Amnada sarur
          - Dhaqana sarur
          - Maxmed sarur
        - Loodone Midigsame
          - 1: Wacwacaale Lo'doone
          - 2: Diintiwaaq Lo'doone
          - 3: Gesol Lo'doone
          - 4: Gaadineceb Lo'doone
          - 5: Ishaarabe Lo'doone
          - 6: Barisame Lo'doone 1
            - Wacwaale Loodone
          - A.. Samatalis
          - B.. Abdiraxman
            1. Samatalis
          - A Faramage Samatalis
          - 2: Yuusuf Samatalis
          - 3: Dige Samatalis
          - 4: Cabdale Samatalis
              1. Faramage ( Reer Ugaas)
            1. 1) Dhoore
            2. 2) Dhaga Digane
            3. Dhiore
          - 1:hiraabe dhoore
          - 2:dalab dhoore
          - 3:cabdulle dhoore
          - 4:agoon ebakar dhoore
          - 5:shabeelow dhoore
            1. dhaga_digane
          - 1:caalin
          - 2:xasan guuled
          - 3:warfaa
          - 4:habar agay
          - 5:cali madax
          - 6:ugaas guled
            1. Yuusuf_Samatalis ( Cabdi yuusuf )
          - 1...Garaad Cabdi
          - 2... Abuubakar Cabdi
          - 3.... Habarwaa Cabdi
          - 4.... Aadan Cabd
          - i #Aadan_Cabdi
          - 1... Jilaajiid
            1. Jilaajiid
          - 1...Mataan Jilaajiid
          - 2.. Urgaale Jilaajiid
          - 3. Cabdale tuur jilaajiid
            1. Mataan_Jilaajiid
          - 1.... Feeroole Mataan
          - 2.... iidle Mataan
          - 3... Warfaa Mataan C)
            1. Dige_Samatalis wuxu ukala baxaa
          - A....Ciise Dige
          - B...Yabar Dige
            1. Yabar_Dige
          - 1: Aadan Warsame(Warsame Yabar)
          - 2: Urkaxeeb(Ibrahim Yabar)
          - 3:Owsan
          - 4:Reerame Yabar
          - A #Aadan_warsame
          - 1:habarduduble
          - 2:habar yusuf
          - 3:habar martiile
          - B #Urkaxeeb
          - 1.muuse Ali ibaahin(Dacalweyne)
          - 2.Maxamed cali ibraahin( Maxamed Dacay)
          - 3.Mataan Cali Ibraahin (mataan Dhuub)
          - C #Owsan waxaa uu ukala baxaa
          - 1:ibrahim samakaab
          - 2:Diini samakaab
          - 3:Maxamuud samakaab
          - 4:Waceys samakaab &
          - 5:Adeerkood ibrahim.
            1. Ciise_Dige
          - A...Yacquub Ciise
          - B...Ibrahim Ciise
          - C...Madaxweyne Ciise
            1. Yacquub_Ciise
          - 1: Makaraam adan
          - 2: gacal adan
          - 3: wayax adan
          - 4: jiil Yacquub
            1. Ibrahim_ciise
          - 1:Ogoweyne
          - 2:Adan Xuseen
          - 3:Axmed xalane
          - 4:Yabarow
          - 5:Mataan
            1. Madaxweyne_Ciise
          - A.. Cabdalle Madaxweyne
          - B... yabar Madaxweyne
          - C... Cali Madaxweyne
          - D... Axmed Madaxweyne
          - E... Geedi Madaxweyne
            1. Cabdale_Madaxweyne (Agoon Cabdale )
          - 1- irab cabdiweyne cadow agoon
          - 2- xassan agoon (gaalible).
          - 3- axmed agoon oo kala ah.
          - A-cigale xaji.
          - B-yabaal xaji.
          - C- saciid xaji.
          - D- ciise jibril.
          - E- guwaaq
          - 4- wardheere agoon.
          - 5- bacar agoon.
            1. Yabar_Madaxweyne
          - 1...Aadan yabar
          - 2...Maxamuud yabar
          - 3...Cali yabar
          - 4....Irib xusen yabar
          - 5...Tuurow yabar
          - 6...Baane yabar
          - 7...Yabar madoow
          - 8...Cabdale Xalane
          - 9...iidle yabar
          - 10..Guudcade yabar
            1. Ali_Madaxweyne
          - A...Daarood Ali
          - B...Mohamed Ali
          - C....xaruun Ali
            1. Daarood_Cali
          - 1...Xasan muuse
          - 2...Faarax Cagaweyne
          - 3....Nuur Samatar
            1. Maxamad_Cali
          - 1:Aadan xagaley
          - 2:Axmad Xagaley
          - 3: Maxamuud xagaley
            1. Xaruun_Cali
          - 1:Faarax irib
          - 2:Xalane irib
          - 3:Cali irib
          - 4;Maalin irib
          - 5:Samatar Irib
          - 6:Qalaf irib
          - 7:Maxamad Cigale(Reer Foodeey)
          - 8: Qeyle Cigale
            1. Cabdale_Samatalis
          - A...maxamed Cabdale
          - B...Saleeban cabdale
          - C... Aadan cabdale
          - D....idiris cabdale E.... Cumar Cabdale
            1. Maxamed_Cabdale
          - A... Xasan Maxamed
          - B.... Xuseen Maxamed
            1. Xasan_maxamed
          - 1..Guuled fodeey
          - 2...Jimcaale fodeey
          - 3...Dhagaweyne
          - 4..Aadan cadow
          - 5..Siyaad abiikar
          - 6...Hiloowle
          - 7...Guuleed yabar kuul
          - 8...Uraab
          - 9...Kuulow kadiil
          - 10...Ciire
          - 2 ..Xuseen_maxamed
          - 1..Dibjire
          - 2...Liibaan dhuub
          - 3..Samatar
          - 4...Faqa Liibaan
          - 5..Faarax Cigalle
          - 6...Bulbul Gureey
          - 7..Baalle Basagaab
            1. Salemaan_Cabdale
          - 1...Gacaneey Salemaan
          - 2...Xaragaale Salemaan
          - 3...Muuse Salemaan
            1. Aadan_Cabdale
          - 1...Geel Bari Aadan
          - 2...Geesaweyne Aadan
          - 3...Ibrahim Aadan
          - 4...maxamed Aadan

== Notable people ==
- Omar Hashi Aden - was a member of the Transitional Federal Government of Somalia, eventually rising to Security Minister, and the mayor of Mogadishu in 1992.
- Ali Abdullahi Osoble -former Minister of National Security of Somalia, first President of Hirshabelle state
- Mohamed Abdi Waare -2nd President of Hirshabelle state
- Abdullahi Godah Barre -Somali politician and member of parliament, Minister of Education and Higher Education of Somalia, former Minister of Interior and Federal affairs
