= Rahma Guliye =

Somalian politician

Hirshabelle State's Minister for Women and Human Rights
- President: Ali Abdullahi Hussein

Personal details
- Born: Mandera, Kenya
- Education: Moi Girls' Secondary School

Rahma Bint Guliye, also Rahma Mohamed Guliye, is a Somali politician and activist in the Federal Government of Somalia. She is Hirshabelle State's Minister for Women and Human Rights, and was the first Somali MP to be elected from the Degodia clan.

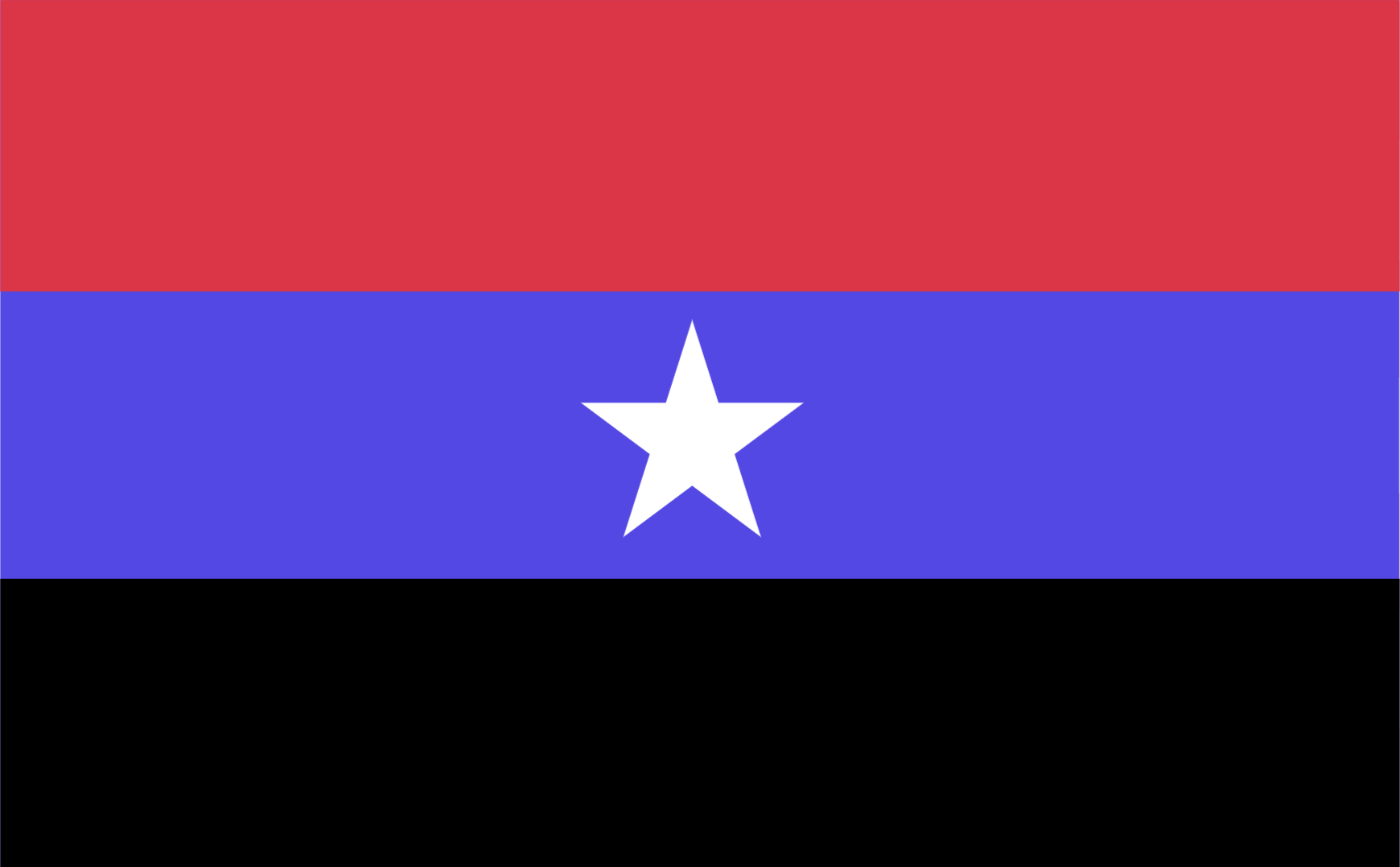
Degodia Flag

Guliye was born in Mandera, Kenya. She studied at Moi Girls' Secondary School, later studying to become a clinical nutritionist. From 2007 to 2010 she worked with Médecins Sans Frontières. She has also extensively fund-raised for medical care for families in her community. On 2 November 2020 she was appointed Chief of Staff to the government. Later that month, as a representative of both Kenyan and Somali clan members, she was part of a launch of the Degodia flag. She later denied any connection with any potential Degodia secession movement.
