= Saransoor =

Somali Clan

Languages
- Somali

Religion
- Sunni Islam

Related ethnic groups
- Garre Awrmale Hawiye Dir Hubeer Ajuran Dabarre

Saransoor (Somali: Saransoor) is a Somali Samaale clan family, among the largest by population and by area, inhabiting a traditional territory in Somalia spanning from Qorahsin, Hiran, to Ras Kamboni, Lower Jubba. In Kenya's North Eastern Province, Saransor make up the majority of the inhabitants of Wajir and have a significant presence in Mandera County they also have large population in Marsabit County and Isiolo County and Nairobi. In Ethiopia, a majority of the population of Liben Zone is Saransor they have very large population in Afdher, Dollo, Shabelle, Jarar, Dira Dawa and Jijiga.

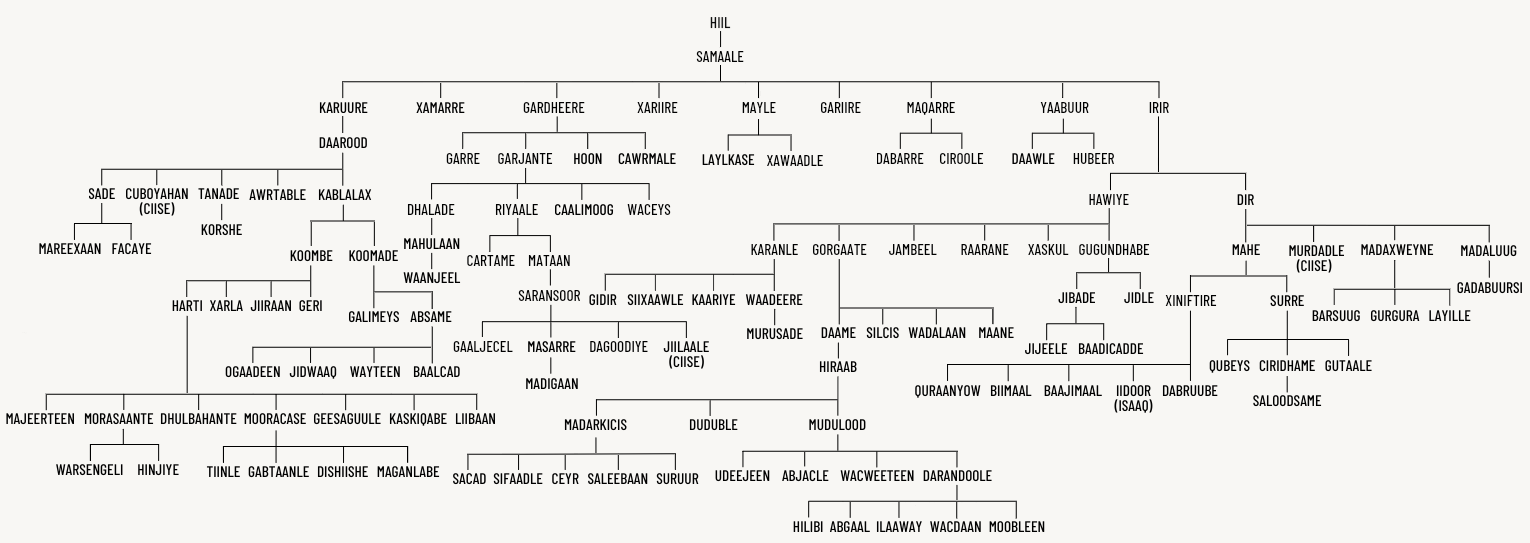
Genealogical tree of Somali clans

The Saransor comprise four major sub-clans include Gaalje'el, Degoodi, Masarre, and Issa Saransor.
