= List of presidents of Hirshabelle =

President of the Hirshabelle
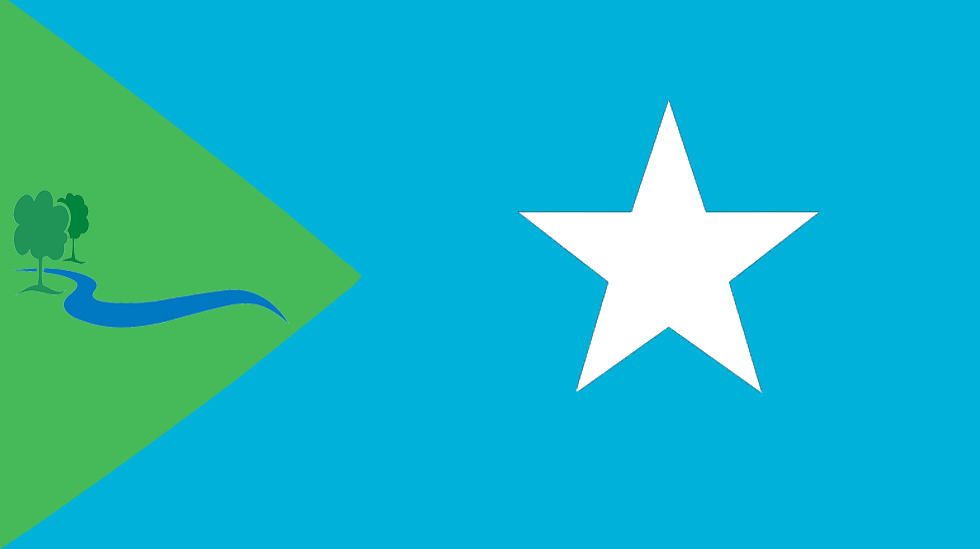
- Flag of Hirshabelle

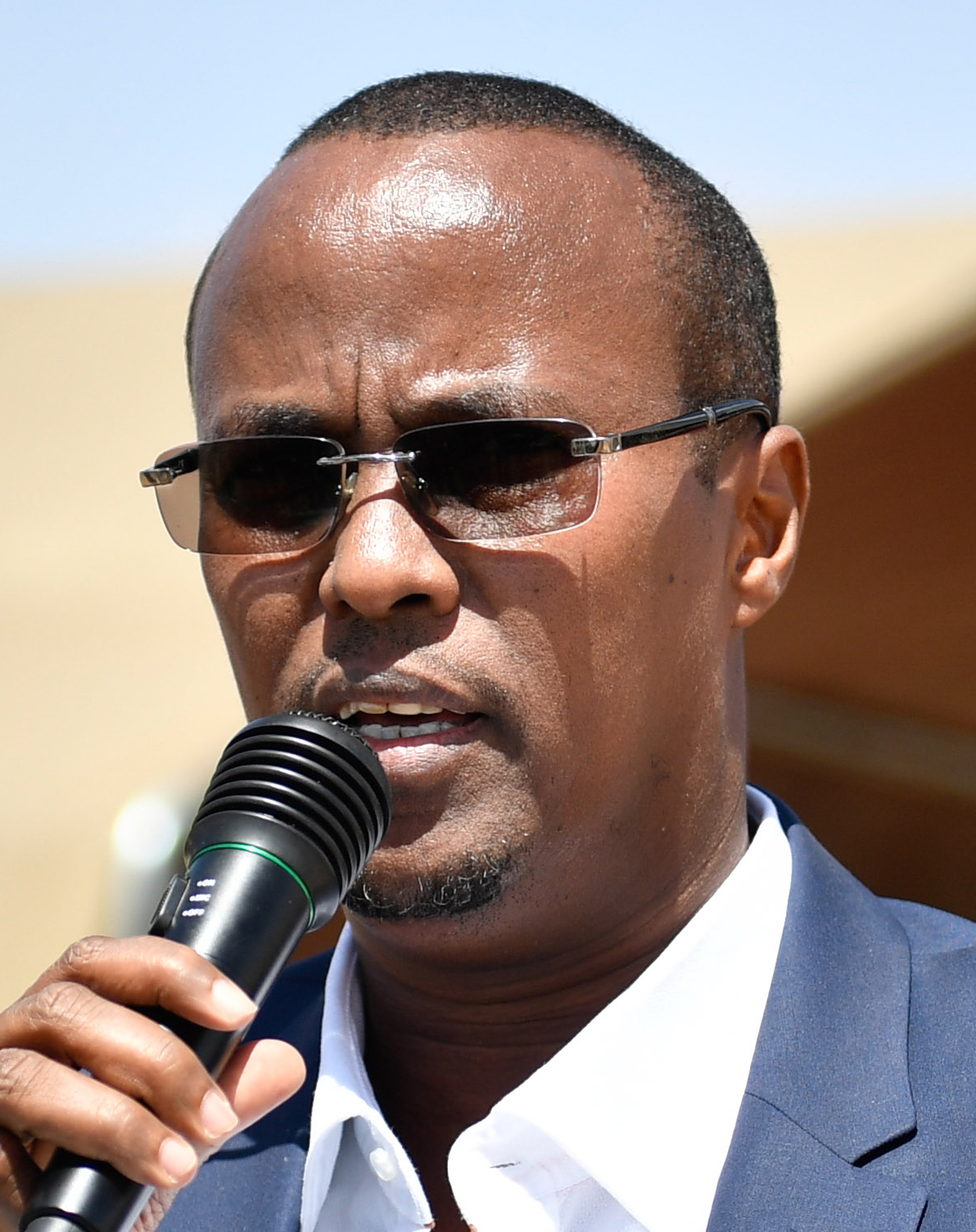
- Incumbent; Ali Gudlawe since 12 November 2020

The president of Hirshabelle is the executive head of state of Hirshabelle, a federated state of the Federal Republic of Somalia, and is elected by the Hirshabelle legislature to serve an indeterminate term.

== List ==
Portrait	Name	Term of office		Vice President	Political party
	Governor of Hiran				
	Mohamud Abdi Gaab	2011	2014		Independent
	President of Hirshabelle				
1	Ali Abdullahi Osoble	17 October 2016	14 August 2017	Barre Hiraale	Independent
—	Ali Gudlawe Acting	14 August 2017	16 September 2017		Independent
2	Mohamed Abdi Ware	16 September 2017	2 November 2020	Ali Gudlawe	Independent
3	Ali Gudlawe	12 November 2020	Incumbent	Yusuf Ahmed Hagar	Independent

== See also ==
- List of presidents of Jubaland
- List of presidents of Puntland
- Lists of office-holders
