= Hirshabelle =

State in Somalia

Hirshabelle State of Somalia: Maamul-Goboleedka Hirshabeele ee Soomaaliya (Somali); ولاية هيرشابيل الصومال (Arabic); Wilāyat hirshabeele aṣ-Ṣūmāl
- Flag Coat of arms
- Anthem: Qolobaa Calankeed
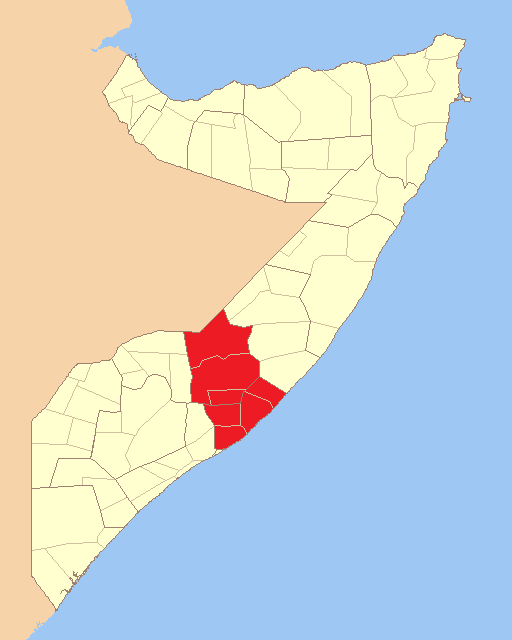
- Capital and largest city: Jowhar; 04°44′09″N 045°12′13″E
- Official languages: Somali
- Ethnic groups: Somali
- Religion: Islam
- Demonym: Somali
- Government: Federated state under a presidential democracy
  - Governor: Ali Abdullahi Hussein
  - Lieutenant Governor: Yusuf Ahmed Hagar Dabageed

Autonomy Federal Member State within Somalia

Population
  - 2019 estimate: 1,964,100 (estimate)
- HDI: 0.3 low
- Currency: Somali shilling (SOS)
- Time zone: UTC+3 (EAT)
  - Summer (DST): UTC+3 (not observed)
- Calling code: +252 (Somalia)
- ISO 3166 code: SO
- Internet TLD: .so

Hirshabelle, officially Hirshabelle State of Somalia (Somali: Maamul-Goboleedka Hirshabelle ee Soomaaliya), is a Federal Member State in south-central Somalia. It is bordered by Galmudug state of Somalia to the north, South West State of Somalia and Banadir region to the south, Ethiopia to the west and the Indian Ocean to the east. Jowhar is the capital city.

Hirshabelle consists of the Hiran and Middle Shabelle regions of Somalia, each with a rich history and significant presence. The name of the state originates from combining their names. Hirshabelle proclaimed itself the autonomous Federal Member State of the Federal Republic of Somalia as stipulated in the provisional Constitution of Somalia.

== History ==
Hirshabelle is the last Federal member state (FMS) established in Somalia after a consensus agreement was reached by clan leaders. Hirshabelle consists of two regions, namely Hiraan and Middle Shabelle. The State was established under article 49 of the Federal Government of Somalia’s provisional constitution, which stipulates that based on a voluntary decision, two or more regions may merge to form a Federal Member State (FMS). The clan elders thereafter selected 97 members of parliament.

In October 2016, local presidential elections were held, which were won by Ali Abdullahi Osoble.

On 11 March 2017, the Hirshabelle Parliament approved a new Cabinet of 52 Ministers.

In 2017, the Hirshabelle Parliament unconstitutionally removed Ali Abdullahi Osoble from the post of President due to a loss of confidence in which 66 deputies voted for a vote of no confidence without his presence with only 2 deputies opposing it and 6 deputies abstaining.

In September 2017, Parliament elected Mohamed Abdi Ware as the new interim President, with immediate endorsement from the Federal Government.

Ali Abdullahi Hussein has held the position of President in Hirshabelle State since 2020. Out of the 99 members of Parliament, 86 cast their votes in favor of him, with the remaining 13 votes going to Abdirahman Jimale Osman.

== Administration ==
The President of Hirshabelle is both the executive head of Hirshabelle State of Somalia and head of government. The President can appoint and dismiss Cabinet members.

=== Presidents ===
For a comprehensive list of the presidents of Hirshabelle State of Somalia, see the List of presidents of Hirshabelle article. The current president of Hirshabelle is Ali Abdullahi Hussein.

== Demographics ==
According to the Population Estimation Survey for Somalia 2014, Hirshablle State has a population of 1.03 million inhabitants, with 19% residing in urban areas, 37% in rural, and 34% in the nomadic areas. The state hosts a large number of internally displaced people (IDPs) due to the war with Al-Shabaab in the region, IDPS account for 10% of the state's population. The sex distribution for Hirshabelle indicates that 45% are male, while 55% are female.

Among the most prominent clans in Hirshabelle are the Gaalje'el, Hawadle, Abgaal, Badi Ade, Udejeen and Jareerweyn.

== Geography ==
The Hirshabelle State is located in the South-Central part of Somalia, and consists of two regions; Hiraan and Middle Shabelle. The name of the state originates from combining these two regions names.

The state is bordered by Galmudug to the north, South West State and Benadir to the south, Ethiopia to the west and the Indian Ocean to the east.

Jowhar is the capital city while Beledweyne is the second biggest city. The main port town is Adale and the state is state is crossed by the Shabelle river which is symbolized in its flag.

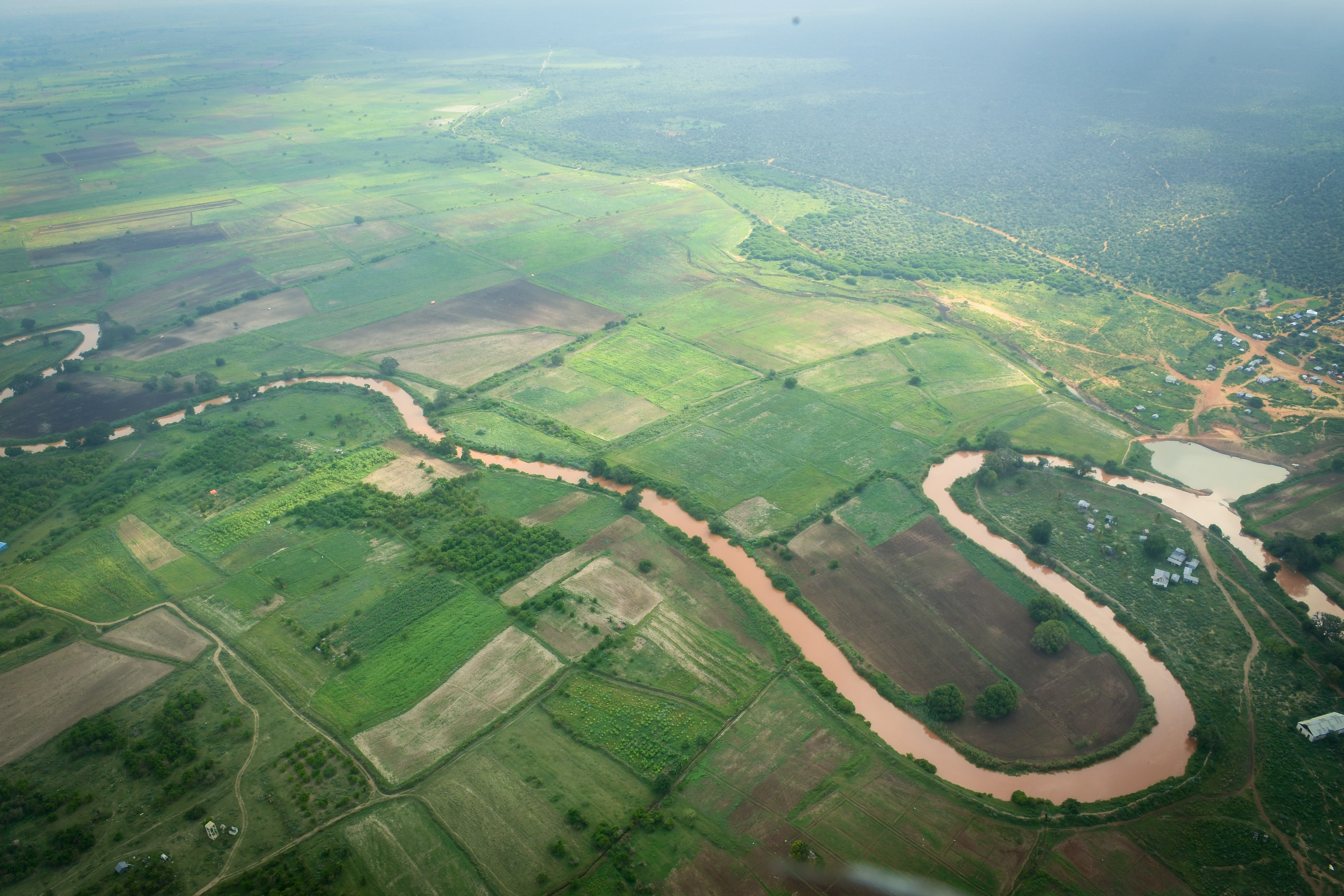
Shabelle river

== Climate ==
In March and April, the average daily maximum temperature in Beledweyne, the capital of Hiraan, is 36.7 °C (98.1 °F). In December, the average daily maximum temperature is 21.9 °C (71.4 °F).

Climate data for Beledweyne, Somalia
Month	Jan	Feb	Mar	Apr	May	Jun	Jul	Aug	Sep	Oct	Nov	Dec	Year
Record high °C (°F)	41.5 (106.7)	42.5 (108.5)	43.0 (109.4)	43.0 (109.4)	41.3 (106.3)	39.0 (102.2)	39.0 (102.2)	39.0 (102.2)	40.2 (104.4)	45.0 (113.0)	40.0 (104.0)	42.0 (107.6)	45.0 (113.0)
Mean daily maximum °C (°F)	34.5 (94.1)	35.4 (95.7)	36.7 (98.1)	36.9 (98.4)	34.9 (94.8)	34.0 (93.2)	33.0 (91.4)	33.8 (92.8)	35.3 (95.5)	34.4 (93.9)	34.8 (94.6)	34.5 (94.1)	34.8 (94.6)
Daily mean °C (°F)	28.2 (82.8)	28.7 (83.7)	30.0 (86.0)	30.4 (86.7)	29.2 (84.6)	28.4 (83.1)	27.8 (82.0)	27.7 (81.9)	29.0 (84.2)	28.7 (83.7)	28.5 (83.3)	28.5 (83.3)	28.7 (83.7)
Mean daily minimum °C (°F)	22.0 (71.6)	22.0 (71.6)	23.4 (74.1)	23.9 (75.0)	23.4 (74.1)	22.8 (73.0)	22.6 (72.7)	21.6 (70.9)	22.7 (72.9)	22.6 (72.7)	22.3 (72.1)	22.3 (72.1)	22.6 (72.7)
Record low °C (°F)	16.0 (60.8)	16.5 (61.7)	17.0 (62.6)	16.0 (60.8)	18.0 (64.4)	17.0 (62.6)	17.0 (62.6)	16.3 (61.3)	17.2 (63.0)	17.0 (62.6)	15.0 (59.0)	15.0 (59.0)	15.0 (59.0)
Average precipitation mm (inches)	0 (0)	1 (0.0)	5 (0.2)	48 (1.9)	59 (2.3)	6 (0.2)	3 (0.1)	3 (0.1)	8 (0.3)	51 (2.0)	16 (0.6)	5 (0.2)	204 (8.0)
Average precipitation days (≥ 1.0 mm)	0	0	0	5	5	0	0	0	0	4	2	0	20
Average relative humidity (%)	58	57	57	60	64	61	65	64	59	64	63	62	61
Mean monthly sunshine hours	288.3	276.9	288.3	243.0	272.8	249.0	201.5	232.5	246.0	223.2	243.0	269.7	3,034.2
Mean daily sunshine hours	9.3	9.8	9.3	8.1	8.8	8.3	6.5	7.5	8.2	7.2	8.1	8.7	8.3
Percentage possible sunshine	80	79	65	53	54	61	54	62	62	57	60	69	63
Source 1: Deutscher Wetterdienst
Source 2: Food and Agriculture Organization: Somalia Water and Land Management (per cent sunshine)
