= Caloofi =

Aloofi (Somali: Caloofi) is Somali clan sub-clan of Gaaljecel, Historical records identify Govanle District as being within the territory associated with Galgial Alofi, together with Aden Yaber. The same records describe water sources and wells located within these territories The historical source records a large perennial water source in Ciblile District, described as being in the territory of Galcial Aloh, and identifies Govanle District with the territory of Galgial Alofi and Aden Yaber.
