= Gaalje'el =

Major Somali clan

Gaalje'el الگلجعل Habar Tigaaiue

Languages
- Somali

Religion
- Islam (Sunni)

Related ethnic groups
- Garre, Degoodi, ciise and masare other Somalis

The Gaalje'el (Somali: Gaaljecel), (Italian: Galgial), (Arabic: الگلجعل) or Habar Tigaalle is one of the largest Somali clans. Its origins trace back to Samaale. The Galje'el clan belongs to the major Saransor clan family, which in turn is a sub-clan of the wider Gardhere Samaale clans.

The clan is well known for their dominating and ruling the regions of Hiran, Shabelle, and Jubada. They are well known for their battles against the Italian colonists, who were unable to occupy their land. The clan is also known for fighting against the Abyssinians who wanted to expand in the area of the Shebelle River.

== Tradition ==
=== Wells ===
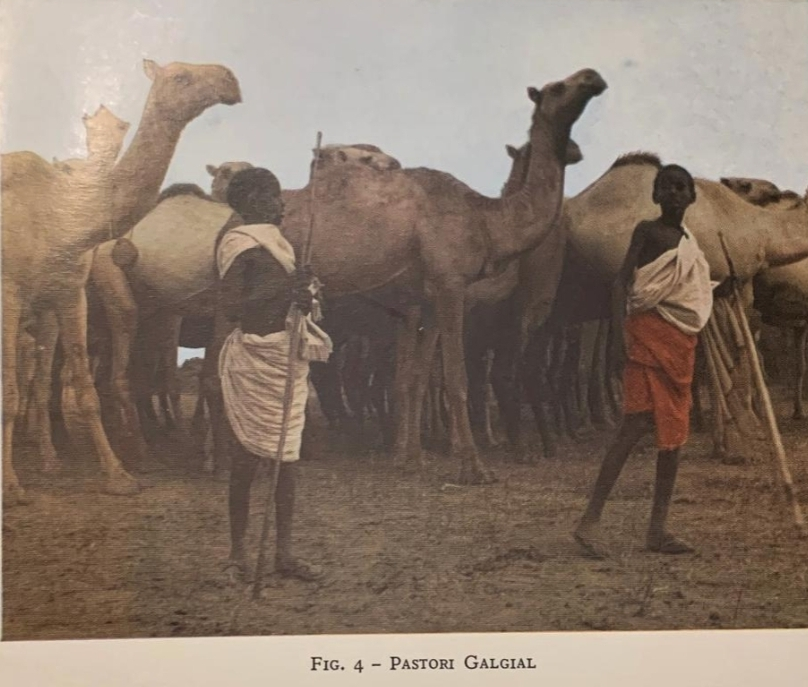
Two young camel herders from the Galgial tribe patiently wait by the wells, ready to provide water for their camels.

Within the Gaalje'el tribe, some wells exclusively belong to a single sub-tribe while others serve as communal resources for two or more sub-tribes or even the entire Gaalje'el community. Additionally, specific excavations by minor groups or individuals result in wells owned solely by them.

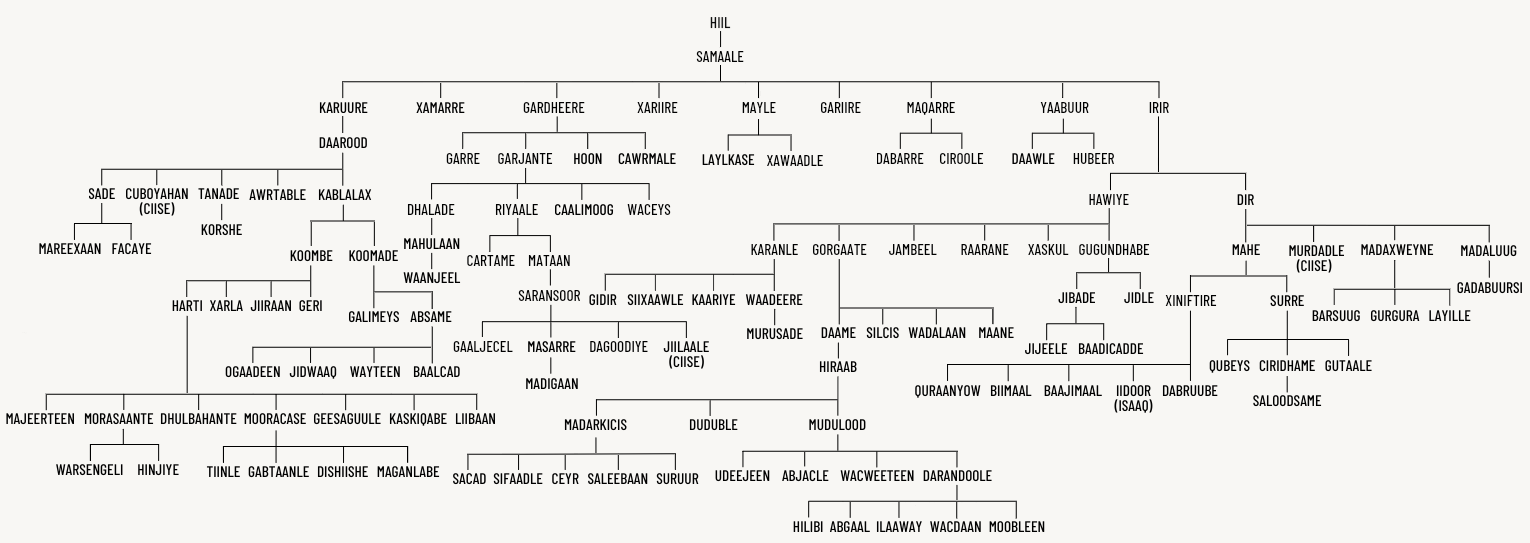
Genealogical tree of Somali clans

The utilization of wells follows a system of reciprocity among all Galgial sub-tribes. However, non-owners must respect the owners' right of precedence when accessing these vital water sources. In instances of wells collectively owned, the individual arriving first claims the right of precedence during watering.

A distinctive practice arises when the Barsame people visit wells belonging to other sub-tribes. Due to a recognized right of progeniture and a gesture of special respect, Barsames are consistently granted access to water and are occasionally given precedence. Conversely, when other Gaalje'el groups approach wells owned by Barsanes, they may water their cattle only at night or during the day if Barsanes are absent with their cattle, even if they arrived later.

For example, the Hatful district in the Barsane tribe boasts around 40 natural wells, averaging 2 meters in depth. Water is manually drawn using leather handbags, each holding 250,000 liters.

== Etymology ==
The name Gaalje'el consists of two words in the Af May Language, Gaal meaning camel and je'el meaning love: gaalje'el meaning "that which loves the camel". Gaal is the Af May (Reewin dialect) equivalent of Geel in Af Maḥa Tiri (the Maḥa Tiri dialect).

Another etymology, which has recently gained steam, references the Jaalin tribe of Sudan. By combining "Geel", the dromedory camel for which the tribe is known to rear, with the Arabic Al Je'el (الجعل), proponents of this etymology point to the bedouin nature of the Gaalje'el and surmise that the tribe could have had its origins in the nearby country, since they share the names of several branches.

== Distribution ==
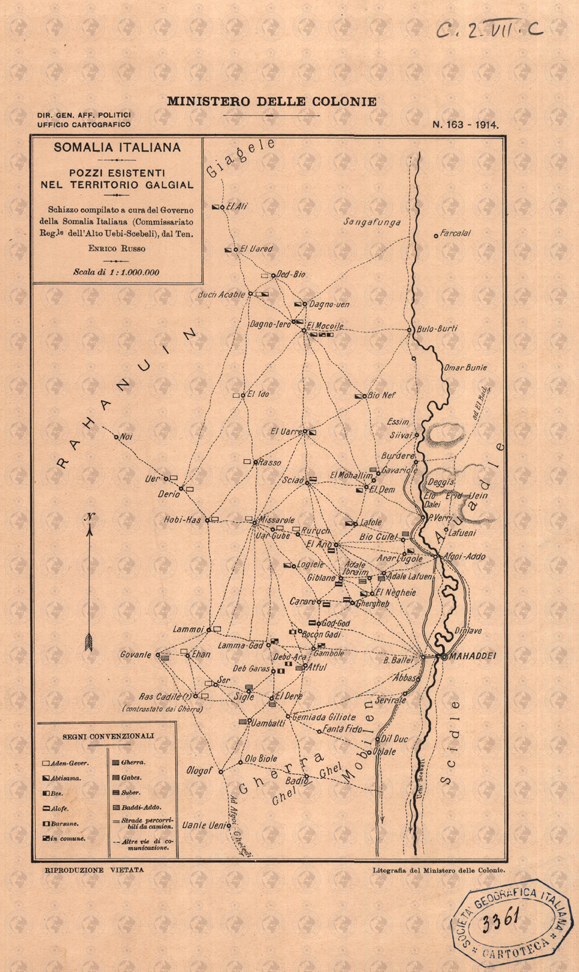
Map of the well-known Gaalje'el wells located Qorahsin

The expanse of Gaalje'el land unfolds from Baladweyne to the proximity of Mogadishu, representing its length. Additionally, from Baladweyne to Burhakaba forms its width. Beyond this, another segment of Gaalje'el territory starts Dooy land, dominates nearly 70% of the Middle Jubba region. This vast stretch continues to the eastern areas of Lower Jubba, Gaalje'el land converges with the land of the Boni People, marking the conclusion of the Gaalje'el territory.

The Gaalje'el traditionally settled in the region called Qorahsin of Hiraan, Lower Shabelle, Middle Shabelle These regions are called Qorahsin because it is located west of the Shabelle River.

The Gaalje'el members are also found in the North East Province of Kenya.

The Gaalje'el are often incorrectly associated with the Hawiye clan due to their close political and social alignment. However, the Gaalje'el actually descend from Saransoor, as do the Degoodi, Masarre and the Iise. This means that there is no closer blood relation than beyond those also shared amongst all Somalis.

== History ==
Mahaday Attack

On 1 April 1924, around 60 Gaalje'el men from Alofi and Yeber Omar. gathered north of Mahaday. They went to Neghei, a place not far from the river where the Italian-Somali agricultural society held a small lime factory. The men invaded the town. The guard Gogles and the native personnel were disarmed, and two huts were set on fire. They sacked everything.

The conflict between the Italians and the Gaalje'el was a part of the broader conflict between Italy and the Somali people during the colonial era. The Gaalje'el, like many other Somali clans, fiercely resisted the Italian occupation of their land and fought against the Italian colonial forces in the early 20th century.

The Gaalje'el warriors were known for their bravery, skill in battle, and use of guerrilla tactics. They used their knowledge of the terrain to their advantage and employed hit-and-run tactics against the Italian forces. They also made use of traditional weapons such as spears and swords, as well as firearms obtained from other sources.

The Italians, on the other hand, had a technological advantage over the Gaalje'el. They had access to modern weapons, such as machine guns and artillery, which they used to devastating effect. However, the Italians found it difficult to maintain control over the areas inhabited by the Gaalje'el due to the resilience and determination of the clan.

The conflict between the Italians and the Gaalje'el lasted for several years and resulted in many casualties on both sides. The Gaalje'el suffered losses, but they were able to inflict significant damage on the Italian forces, which forced the Italians to adopt more aggressive tactics. The Italian forces responded by conducting punitive raids against the Gaalje'el villages, burning down homes and confiscating livestock.

Despite the odds, the Gaalje'el were able to maintain their resistance against the Italians. The Gaalje'el's successful resistance against the Italian colonial forces has been seen as a symbol of the resilience and courage of the Somali people in the face of adversity.

Battle of Dafet

The historical resistance of Gaalje'el against Abyssinian expansion in the Shabelle River region is marked by prolonged confrontations. Notably, the Battle of Dafet stands out as a pivotal moment, where Abyssinians sought to capture Dafet by advancing through the Shabelle River. The Gaalje'el valiantly defended their territory, successfully repelling the Abyssinian forces. This decisive victory resulted in the defeat and retreat of the Abyssinians, with a notable toll of 1500 Amhara horsemen losing their lives during the course of the battle.

The Gaaljecel (also: Gaalje’el, Galjeel) are a Samaale-origin Somali clan historically present along the Shabelle corridor and in Hiiraan, with extensions toward Benadir and Jubada. Scholarship on southern society and river-valley polities shows these communities shaped trade, taxation, and security along interior routes linking Mogadishu to the agricultural hinterland.

=== Colonial front I: Italian Benadir/Shabelle (c. 1890s–1920s) ===
Italian expansion from the Benadir coast into the Shabelle interior met sustained resistance by local lineages. Within this wider setting, sources identify the cleric Sheikh Hassan Barsane (often described as from a Gaaljecel/Barsane division) as leading a Shabelle-valley uprising in the 1920s after rejecting disarmament orders issued under Governor Cesare Maria De Vecchi. Contemporary and later summaries place engagements near riverine localities north of Mahaddey Uen (Mahaday) and around Daafeet/Wanlaweyn; Barsane was reportedly captured in 1924 and died in colonial custody in 1928. For the broader pattern of Italian "pacification" and campaigns, see syntheses on the Italian Somali Wars.

=== Colonial front II: Ethiopian incursions along the Shabelle (early 1900s) ===
Regional memory and later essays recount Barsane-linked fighting against Abyssinian/Ethiopian pushes along the Shabelle in the early 1900s (e.g., actions near Balad and Daafeet/Wanlaweyn). These accounts match the corridor’s geopolitical pressures from upstream and coastward directions, but specific battle lists should be corroborated in archival or peer-reviewed sources before being stated as established fact.

=== Modern echoes ===
The Mogadishu–Wanlaweyn–Baidoa axis remains a strategic overland lifeline, and Gaaljecel-inhabited stretches have figured in recent security contests and checkpoint crackdowns. For example, EUAA’s 2025 COI notes Gaaljecel-affiliated checkpoints in the Yaqbiriweyne area on the Mogadishu–Baidoa road—identified as a recurrent friction point with South West State forces and neighbouring clans—and open-source reporting attributes periodic clashes with al-Shabaab in and around the town.

=== Political economy ===
Somalia is widely cited as having the world’s largest dromedary population, and camels are a core asset in Somali livelihoods and trade. Recent FAO materials estimate the global camel population at more than 41 million head, with rapid growth since 2000; a peer-reviewed synthesis using FAOSTAT 2018 data put the world total at 35.5 million and documented continued expansion thereafter. Within this context, some community sources assert that a majority of Somalia’s camels are owned by Gaaljecel lineages; this claim is not corroborated in peer-reviewed or official datasets and should be treated cautiously pending reliable sourcing. Meanwhile, independent reporting documents the commercialization of camel milk around Mogadishu and policy moves (e.g., a proposed Dairy Act) that could reshape value chains.

In the Horn of Africa, camels underpin milk, meat, transport, and asset storage. Around Mogadishu, reporting highlights a growing camel-milk value chain (collection, processing, urban retail) alongside emerging policy moves toward dairy regulation, with implications for pastoral incomes and urban nutrition. These livelihood trends intersect with corridor politics along the Mogadishu–Wanlaweyn–Baidoa road, where clan institutions—including Gaaljecel in Yaqbiriweyne—feature in market governance (e.g., checkpoint taxation) and security provision.

== Clan tree ==
Samaale
  - Gardheere
    - Garjante
      - Riidhe
        - Riyaale
        - Mataan
        - Saransoor
        - Gaaljecel

== Notable figures ==
- Abdirahman Haji Mumin, Somali politician
- Abdullaahi Faah, former member of parliament
- Mahamuud Garwayne, former minister of commerce
- Amina Mohamed Abdi, Somali politician
- Ali Haji Adan, minister of health
- Sheikh Hassan Barsane, cleric who led a revolt against Italian colonial forces after World War I
- Sheikh Osman Barre, former speaker of parliament
- Abdihakim Luqman, former speaker of parliament.
- Omar Faruk Osman, Somali journalist and trade unionist
- Fawziya Abikar Nur, federal minister of health
- Mohamed Mukhtar Ibrahim, former minister of petroleum and rare materials
- Mohamed Olow Barrow, minister of fisheries
- Ugas Abdirahman Ugas Abdullahi
