= Barsame =

Sub-clan of the Somali Gaalje'el

Barsame(Italian: Barsane) is a prominent sub-clan of the Gaalje'el
