= Gaalje'el Ugaasate =

Gaalje'el Ugaasate (Somali: Ugaasnimada Gaalje'el) is the traditional Ugaas associated with the Gaalje'el (Galgial) clan of Somalia. The title Ugàs is documented the Galgial in Giuseppe Caniglia's 1935 ethnographic work Genti di Somalia. An Italian royal decree of 27 December 1934, published in the Gazzetta Ufficiale del Regno d'Italia in 1935, was identified that Mohamed bin Ugaz Elmi ugaz dei Galgial ("Ugaas of the Galgial").
