= Abdihakim =

Abdihakim is a given name. Notable people with the name include:

- Abdihakim Luqman, Somali politician
- Abdihakim Mohamoud Haji-Faqi, Somali diplomat and politician
- Abdihakim Abdullahi Haji Omar (born 1965), Somali politician
- Abdihakim Dahir Said, Somali police officer
