= Mohamed Omar Eymoy =

Somali politician

Minister of Fisheries and Marine Resources
- In office 6 February 2015 – 29 March 2017
- President: Hassan Sheikh Mohamud
- Prime Minister: Omar Abdirashid Ali Sharmarke
- Preceded by: Mohamed Mukhtar Ibrahim
- Succeeded by: Abdirahman Mohamed Abdi Hashi

Minister of Labour and Social Affairs
- In office 12 January 2015 – 17 January 2015
- Prime Minister: Omar Abdirashid Ali Sharmarke
- Preceded by: Lugman Ismail Ali
- Succeeded by: Mohamed Omar Arte

Personal details
- Party: Independent

Mohamed Omar Eymoy is a Somali politician. He is the former Minister of Labour and Social Affairs of Somalia, having been appointed to the position on 12 January 2015 by the former Prime Minister Omar Abdirashid Ali Sharmarke. However, he only served 2 weeks when on 17 January 2015, Prime Minister Sharmarke dissolved his newly nominated cabinet due to vehement opposition by legislators, who rejected the reappointment of certain former ministers. On 27 January 2015, Sharmarke appointed a new, smaller 20 minister cabinet of which Mohamed Omar Eymoy was replaced by Mohamed Omar Arte. On 6 February, Sharmarke finalized his cabinet, consisting of 26 ministers, 14 state ministers, and 26 deputy ministers of which Mohamed Omar Eymoy was reinstated but was now the Minister of Fisheries and Marine Resources. He has now been succeeded by Abdirahman Mohamed Abdi Hashi.
