= Mohamed Abdullah Hassan =

Mohammed Abdullah Hassan may refer to:

- Mohammed Abdulla Hassan Mohamed, Emirati referee
- Muḥammad ibn 'Abdallāh Hassan, Somali poet and military leader
- Mujahid Miski, a Horner jihadist born as Muhamad Abdullahi Hassan
- Mohamed Abdullahi Hassan Noah, a Somali politician
- Mohamed Abdulla Hassan Mohd, UAE referee
- Mohamed Abdi Hassan, a Horner pirate
- Mohamed Abdul Khalek Hassouna, Egyptian Palestinian Arab League diplomat
