= Udejeen =

Subclan of the Hawiye

اجيجين
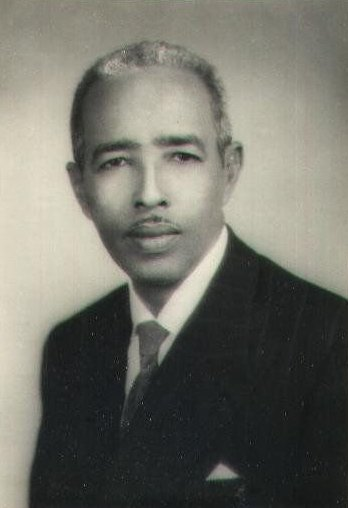
- The first president of Somalia Aden Abdulle Osman Daar.jpg

Languages
- Somali

Religion
- Islam

Related ethnic groups
- Abgaal, Habargidir, Duduble, Sheekhaal and other Hawiye clans

Udejeen (Somali: Ujeejeen, Arabic: اجيجين) is a sub-clan of the Mudulood Hawiye and a larger Samaale clan. It is one of the major Somali clans, and has produced many prominent historical Somali figures, including the first president of Somalia, Aden Abdulle Osman, and various mayors of Somalia, including Mohamed Nur.

== Distribution Clan tree ==
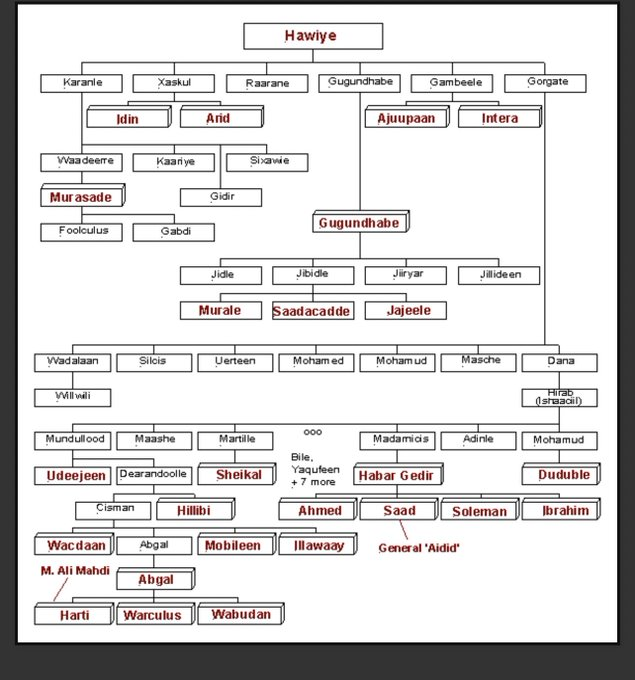
Hawkeye clan tree where Udejeen falls

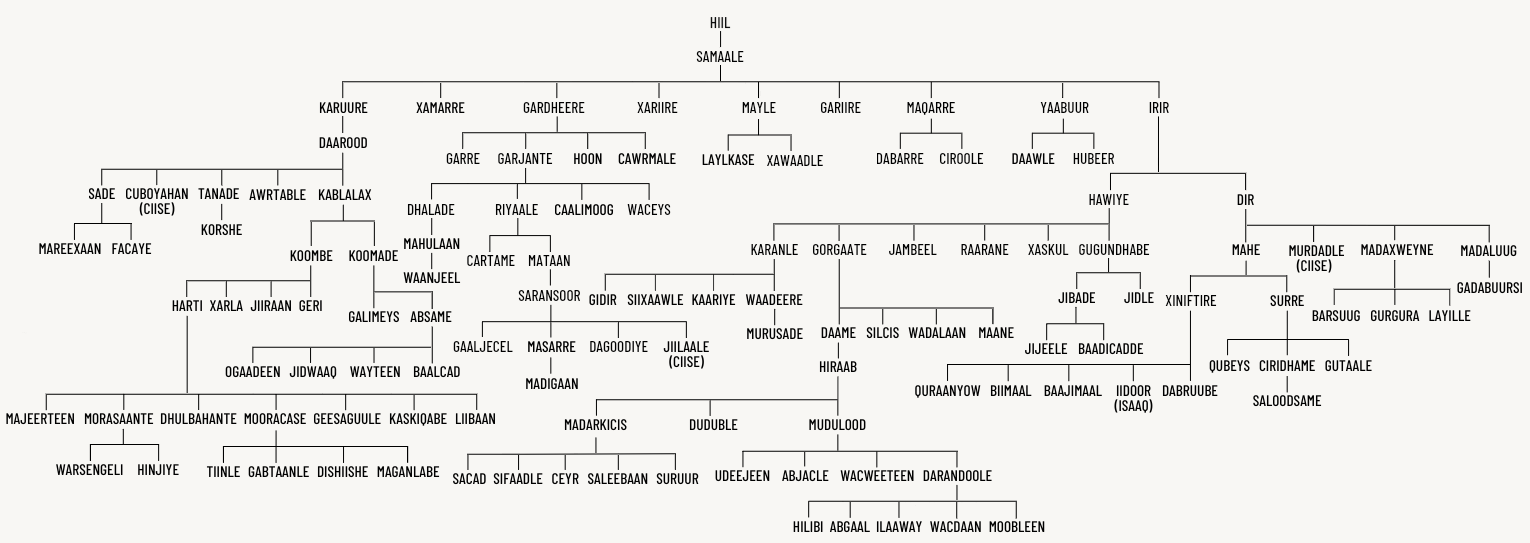
Genealogical tree of Somali clans

The Udejeen primarily live in the region of Hiraan in Somalia, in the districts of Jawiil, Matabaan and Beledweyne, and the Qalimow town of the Middle Shabelle region and in Mogadishu.

They also live in the Somali Region of Ethiopia, primarily in the Mustahil, Ferfer, Baarmagoog and Shilabo districts.

=== Clan tree ===
- Hawiye
  - Hiraab
    - Mudulood
      - Udejeen (Ciise)
        - Abokor
          - Adan Yacquub
          - Ali Yacquub
            - Reer Raage
          - Yusuf Yacquub
            - Xasan Yusuf (Reer Ugaas)
            - Macalin Maxamuud
              - Xersi Macalin
              - Kheyre Macalin
              - Siyaad Macalin
              - Dudub Macalin
              - Faatax Macalin
        - Abaadir
          - Maxamed Samatar

== Prominent Udejeen Members ==
- Aden Adde, first President of Somalia, 1960–1967
- Osman Mohammud Dufle, Somali politician and previous minister of health; nominated for a Nobel Prize for his efforts
- Mohamed Nur, mayor of Mogadishu 2010–2014
