= Gardhere =

Gardere
- Ethnicity: (Somalia) Somali
- Location: (Somalia) Somalia (Ethiopia) Ethiopia; Kenya
- Descended from: Samaale
- Branches: Hoon Gardere; Hoon; Warasile; Garre; Tuuf; Quraan; Ibran Gardere: Coormalla; Garjante: Waceys Garjante; Caalmoog Garjante; Dhalade Garjante; Wanjeel; Riyale Garjante; Cartan Riyale; Matan Riyale; Saransor; Gaaljecel; Degoodi; Masarra; Madiigaan; Ciisa
- Language: (Somalia) Somali
- Religion: Sunni Islam

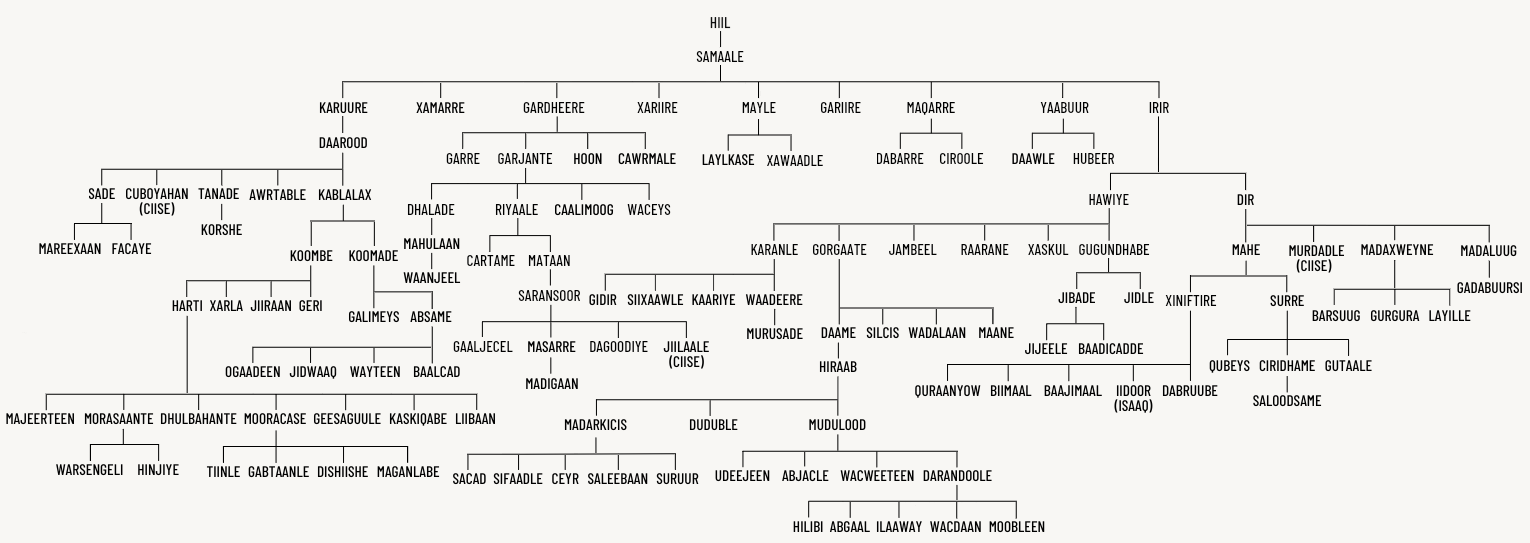
Genealogical tree of Somali clans

According to tradition, Gardhere Samale Hiil (Somali: Gardheere Samaale, also spelled Gardere or Garder) was the first-born child of Samale, the legendary forefather of all Somalis.

Gardhere's descendants are now a large Somali clan that inhabits vast territories in Kenya, Southern Ethiopia, Djibouti and who Southern Somalia. Notable sub-clans who descend from Gardhere include the Garjante, Degodia, Gaalje'el, Masare, Ciise, Garre, and Cawramale .
