= Ali Abdullahi Osoble =

Local politician in Somalia

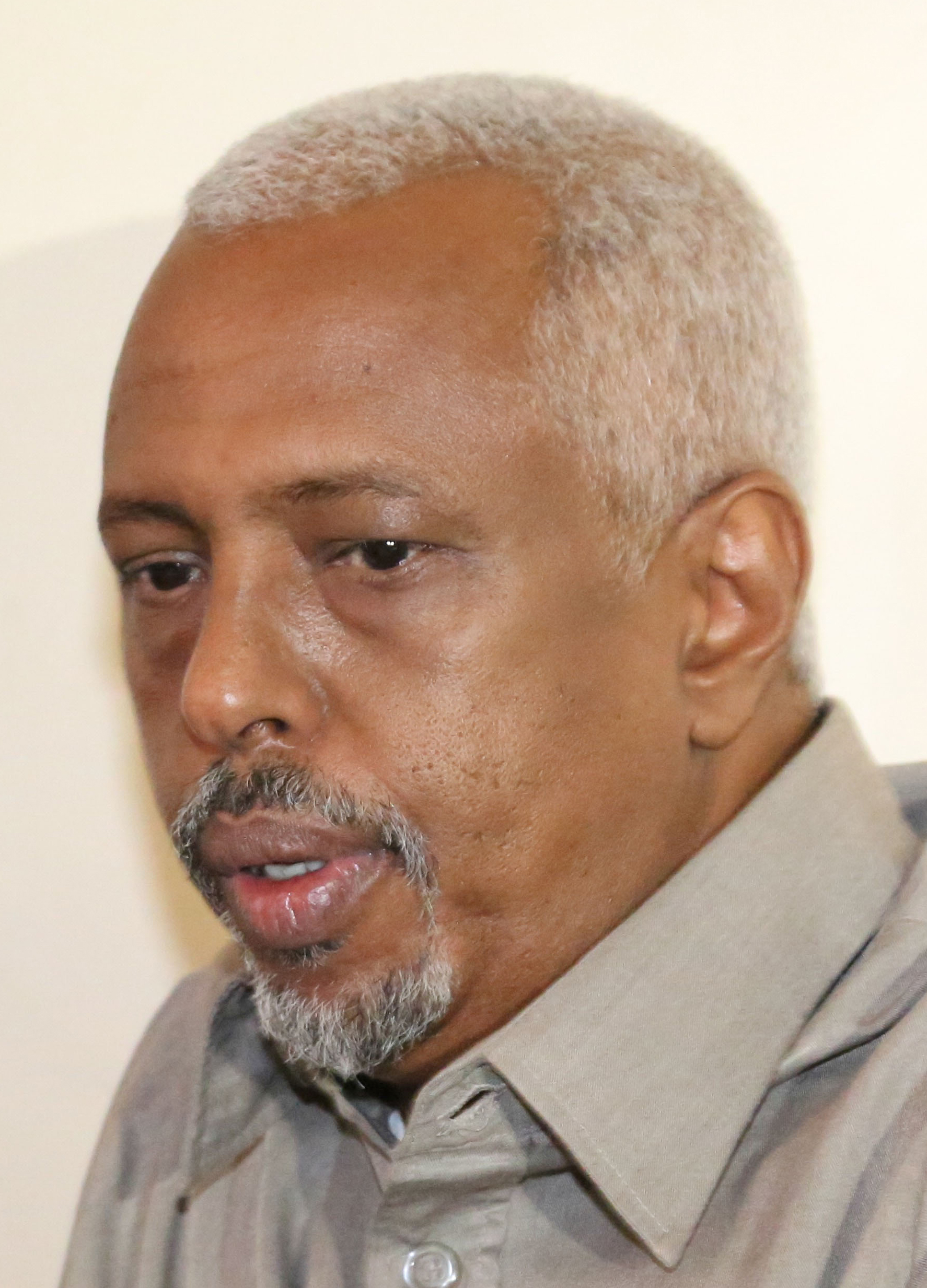

President of Hirshabelle
- In office 17 October 2016 – 14 August 2017
- Succeeded by: Ali Guudlaawe (acting); Mohamed Abdi Ware

Personal details
- Born: June 15 1961= Age 63 Mogadishu, Somalia
- Died: 22/11/2026 Nairobi, Kenya
- Party: Independent
- Education: Sam Houston State University

Ali Abdullahi Osoble he was born in Mogadishu, Somalia) on June 15 1961 he’s is the son of Abdullahi Osoble Siad, who was Minister of Telecommunications during the Siad Barre Regime in the 1970s and 1980s and also the maternal grandson of Ahmed Gelle, who was the Minister of Justice prior to the military regime. He was first president of Hirshabelle State, the regional federal state of Somalia and the first to serve under its established name of Hirshabelle. Osoble is the individual who presided over the creation of state institutions of Hirshabelle.

== Biography ==
Osoble was born in Mogadishu, Somalia on June 15 1961 he received his primary and secondary education there. He studied in the USA, at Sam Houston State University, and graduated with a bachelor's degree in Agricultural economics. Before the fall of the Barre government, Osoble worked for a time at the Bank of Somalia. He soon began working for the Oxfam-Quebec branch in Beledwayne, and then in Nairobi, the capital of Kenya, thus representing Somalia.

Osoble entered politics in 2004 and was a member of Parliament of the Transitional federal government (TFG) from until 2012.

On 7 January 2005, the government of Ali Mohammed Ghedi, under the leadership of Abdullahi Yusuf Ahmed, appointed Osoble as Minister of Education, Osoble with a cabinet reshuffle was later appointed as Minister of Planning and Economic Development

On 17 October 2016, Ali Abdullahi Osoble was elected President of the Hirshabelle administration.

In 2017, the Hirshabelle Parliament unconstitutionally removed him from the post of President due to a purported loss of confidence. 66 deputies voted for a vote of no confidence without his presence, 2 deputies opposed it, and 6 deputies abstained. Arab Isse Ahmed, second deputy speaker of Parliament of Hirshabelle, who chaired the meeting, announced the results of a vote of no confidence in the President Osoble with the immediate endorsement of the Villa Somalia, and Ali Gudlawe became interim President of Hirshabelle.

Since 2020, he is applying for the post of the new Prime Minister of Somalia.
