= Ugas Abdirahman Ugas Abdullahi =

Ugaas Cabdiraxmaan Ugaas Cabdullaahi is the traditional leader of the Gaaljecel clan in Somalia.

== Peace efforts in Laascaanood ==
In March 2023, Ugaas Cabdiraxmaan travelled to Laascaanood with five other traditional elders from Mogadishu to mediate the conflict.
