= Mohamed Omar Arte =

Somali politician

Mohamed Omar Arte محمد عمر عرتي
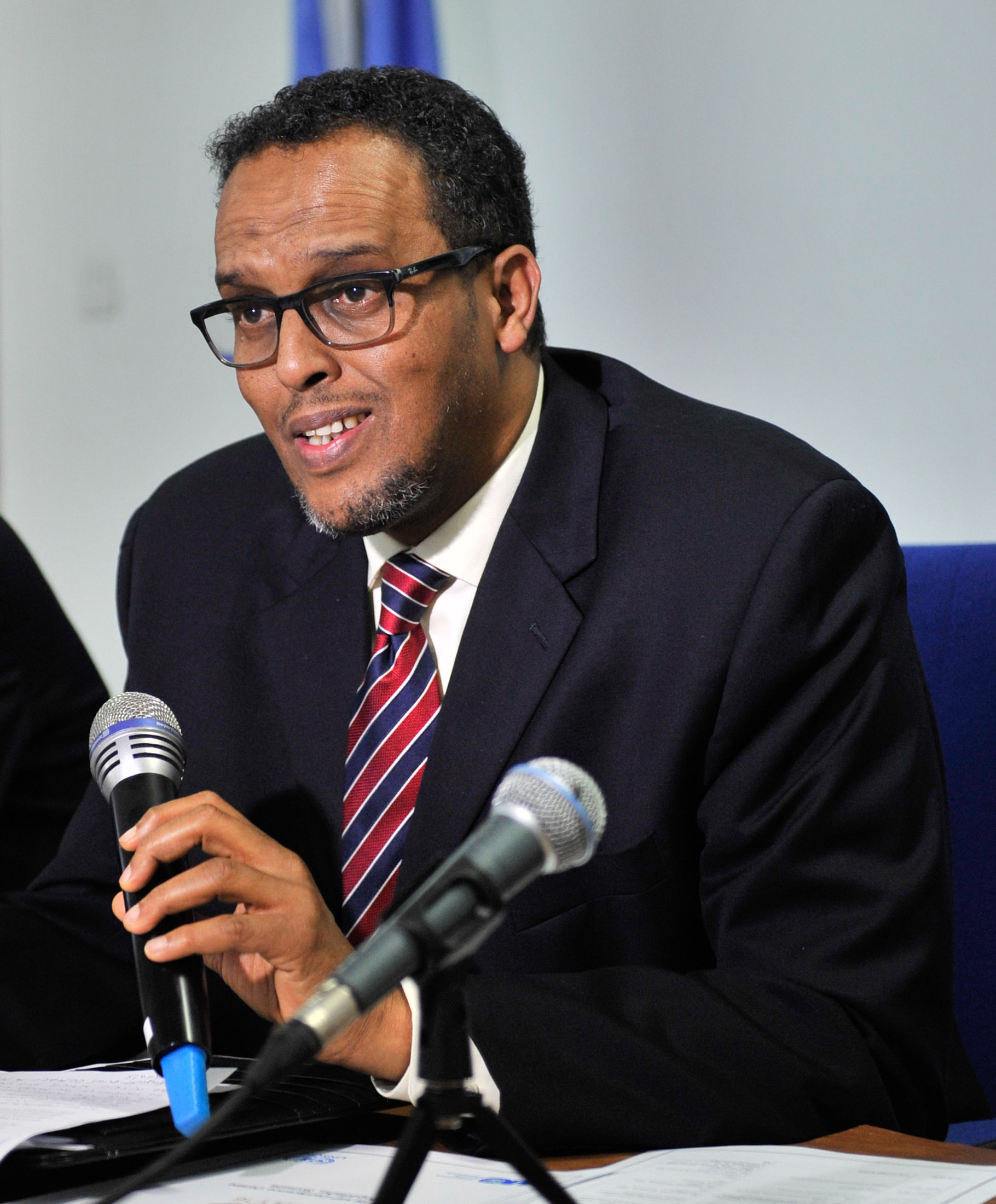

Deputy Prime Minister of Somalia
- In office 27 January 2015 – 29 March 2017
- President: Hassan Sheikh Mohamud
- Prime Minister: Omar Abdirashid Ali Sharmarke
- Preceded by: Ridwan Hirsi Mohamed
- Succeeded by: Mahdi Mohammed Gulaid

Minister of Labor
- In office 27 January 2015 – 6 February 2015
- President: Hassan Sheikh Mohamud
- Prime Minister: Omar Abdirashid Ali Sharmarke
- Preceded by: Mohamed Omar Eymoy
- Succeeded by: Abdiweli Ibrahim Ali Sheikh Muudey

Minister of Youth and Sports
- In office 27 January 2015 – 6 February 2015
- President: Hassan Sheikh Mohamud
- Prime Minister: Omar Abdirashid Ali Sharmarke
- Preceded by: Duale Adan Mohamed
- Succeeded by: Mohamed Abdullahi Hassan Noah

Personal details
- Born: Somalia
- Party: Independent

Mohamed Omar Arte (Somali: Maxamed Cumar Carte, Arabic: محمد عمر عرتي) is a Somali politician. He is the former Deputy Prime Minister of Somalia.

== Personal life ==
Arte hails from the Sa'ad Musa sub-division of the Habr Awal Isaaq clan. He is the son of former Prime Minister of Somalia Umar Arteh Ghalib.

== Deputy Prime Minister of Somalia ==
=== Appointment ===
On 12 January 2015, Arte was appointed Deputy Prime Minister by Prime Minister Omar Abdirashid Ali Sharmarke. On the 17 January 2015, Prime Minister Sharmarke dissolved his newly nominated cabinet due to vehement opposition by legislators, who rejected the reappointment of certain former ministers.

On 27 January 2015, Sharmarke appointed a new, smaller 20 minister Cabinet of which Mohamed Omar Arte was again named Deputy Prime Minister of Somalia of Somalia. This time, he was concurrently named Minister of Labor, Youth and Sports. On 6 February, Sharmarke finalized his cabinet, consisting of 26 ministers, 14 state ministers, and 26 deputy ministers of which Mohamed Omar Arte now held the sole post of Deputy Prime Minister of Somalia . He has now been succeeded by Mahdi Ahmed Guled.

=== Anti-terrorism law ===
In May 2015, Deputy Prime Minister Arte chaired a Federal Cabinet meeting, his first since being lightly wounded during an Al-Shabaab attack on the Central Hotel in Mogadishu in February of the year. The Council of Ministers therein passed an anti-terrorism law. The bill had earlier been approved by the federal ministers, but was subsequently repealed by lawmakers who called for amendments to the legislation. It is part of the government's broader strategy against Al-Shabaab and other anti-peace elements. The law aims to strengthen national security by more effectively countering radicalization and rooting out extremism. It is now slated to be put before parliament for deliberation.
