= Yusuf Dabageed =

Yusuf Ahmed Hagar
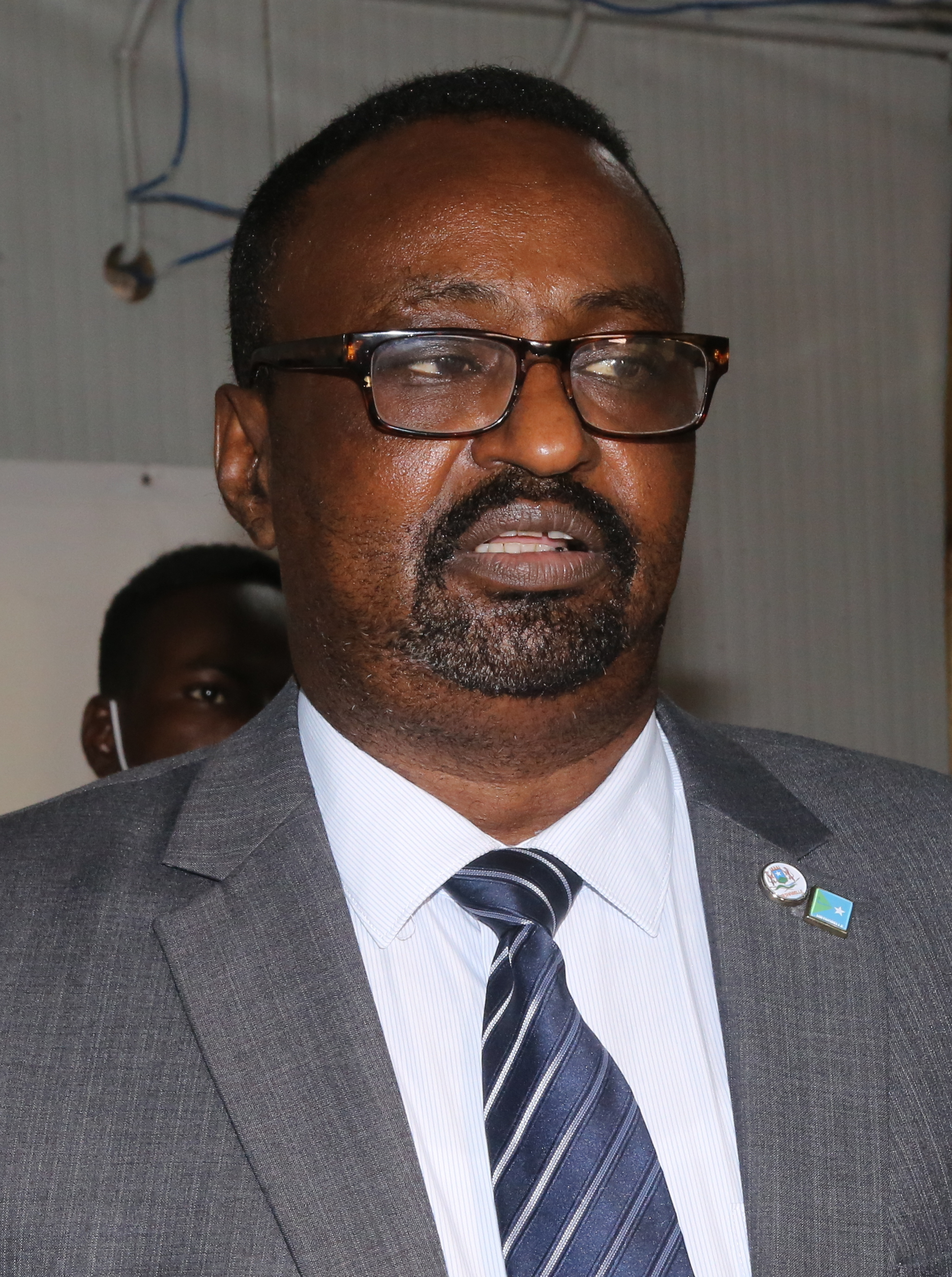

Vice President of Hirshabelle
- Incumbent
- Assumed office 12 November 2020
- President: Ali Abdullahi Hussein
- Preceded by: Ali Abdullahi Hussein

Personal details
- Party: Independent

Yusuf Ahmed Hagar (Dabageed) (Somali: Yuusuf Axmed Xagar Dabageed) is a Somali politician and current Vice President of Hirshabelle State. He was governor of the Hiran region of Somalia. He supports the Somali Transitional Federal Government (TFG), and was militarily supported by Ethiopia in the War in Somalia (2006–2009).

== Flees Beledweyn ==
On 13 August 2006, after resisting for a few days, regional governor Yusuf Ahmed Hagar (also known as Yusuf Mohamud Hagar and "Dabageed"), was deposed by the Islamic Courts Union and fled to Ethiopia to regroup his forces.

== Advances with Ethiopians ==
On December 18, Ethiopian troops were reported occupying Ballanballe in Galgadud province. On the same day another group of Ethiopian troops departed Hiran province, central Somali, accompanied by militias loyal to former defeated warlords Mohammed Dhere and Dabageed.

== Battle of Beledweyne ==
Dabageed was returned to power after the success of the Ethiopian-backed invasion of Hiran province, culminating in the Battle of Beledweyne, fought on December 24–25, 2006.

After the battle, Yusuf Dabageed said, "We have taken control of Baladweyne and our forces are chasing the terrorists. We have killed more than 60 Islamists, wounded others and captured some as prisoners of war." Following their defeat in Baladweyne, leaders of the Islamic courts called on the Ethiopian troops to withdraw.

Dabageed proclaimed the town of Beledweyne was liberated and it was again legal to chew khat. A truck filled with khat arriving the next day, on December 26, was met with a burst of cheers.

== Reprisals in Hiran ==
In an effort to head off additional bloodshed, Yusuf Ahmed Hagar "Dabageed," returning governor of Hiran, called for an end of three days of reprisals conducted by men loyal to him and the TFG. He urged an end to the hunting for former members of the Islamist militias offered assurances that those who were now mingled with the rest of the population would not be hurt or killed.

== Replaced by President Yusuf ==
On 1 January 2007, Somali President Abdullahi Yusuf Ahmed declared a new administrator for Hiiran region, replacing Dabageed. Hussein Mohamud Moalim was named as new administrator, and Saleyman Ahmed Hilawle was nominated as assistant administrator.

== Vice President of Hirshabelle ==
On 11 November 2020, Yusuf Ahmed Hagar was elected the Vice President of Hirshabelle, garnering 87 votes. His competitor, Mohamed Mohamud Abdulle, received only 12 votes.
