= Aden Yabar =

Aden Jever (Somali: Aadan Yabar) is Somali clan of the Galgial Gaalje'el clan family.

== History ==
Aden Jever is one of the main divisions of the Galgial as stated in the text in Giuseppe Caniglia's Genti di Somalia. The other divisions listed by Caniglia are Bersâne, Alòfe, Aptisâne, Aver Galgiàl and Bes.

According to Caniglia Aden Jever are pastoral and they mainly live in the area of Missarole, Mahadei-Uen and El Harrar. When he talks about their sub divisions he mention them consisted of 79 rer, and again second time he mentions that their land is in the area between Missarole, Bal'ad, Mahadei-Uen and Deggi (Tigegle).

Aden Jever name also appear spelling as Aden Jeber was mentioned in the Italian colonial catalogue Catalogo Somali Italia. And the catalogue make connection Aden Jeber as parr of Galgia'el and they live in the town of Buloburti.
