= Degoodi =

Somali clan

The Degodia (also spelled Dagodia or Degoodi) are one of the major Somali clans belonging to the larger Gardhere clan-family of the Somali people. The Degodia live in present-day Somalia, Kenya, and Ethiopia. The community is traditionally pastoralist, relying on camel, cattle, sheep, and goat herding, while also engaging in trade, Islamic scholarship, and local leadership.

== Overview ==
The Degodia are widely considered the largest Somali clan in northeastern Kenya. In Wajir County, they form the overwhelming majority population, with many community estimates placing them at nearly 85% of the county population. The Degodia have historically dominated the social, political, and economic life of Wajir through livestock trade, community leadership, and participation in Kenyan politics. Members of Parliament from major Degodia constituencies include Mohamed Aden Daudi (Wajir East MP), Yussuf Farah Mohamed (Wajir West MP), Adan Keynan Wehliye (Eldas MP) and Hussein Bare Shurie (Tarbaj MP).

The Degodia are also one of the largest Somali clans in Mandera County, where they make up a substantial percentage of the population, especially in Mandera North and surrounding areas. Community estimates place them at around 30% of Mandera County’s population. Notable Degodia political leaders from Mandera include Bashir Sheikh Abdullahi (Mandera North MP), Ali Maalim Mohamud (Mandera deputy governor) and Mariam Sheikh Omar (nominated senator).

Beyond Kenya, the Degodia have a very large presence in the Liban Zone of the Somali Regional State in Ethiopia, where local estimates place them at nearly 80% of the Somali population. The clan has historically controlled large grazing territories and trade routes connecting Ethiopia, Kenya, and Somalia, and the zonal administration and political leadership have often been led by Degodia politicians and officials. The governor or chief administrator of Liban Zone is traditionally from the Degodia clan due to the clan’s large population and political influence in the region.

In Somalia, Degodia communities mainly live in the southern regions, especially near the Kenyan and Ethiopian borders, including parts of Gedo and Jubaland. Due to migration and urbanisation, many Degodia families now also live in Mogadishu, Kismayo, Nairobi, Minneapolis, and other diaspora communities around the world.

Historically, the Degodia maintained strong systems of customary law (xeer), Islamic education, and clan elders who helped preserve unity and resolve disputes. During colonial rule, British, Italian, and Ethiopian borders divided Somali communities, across three countries, but the Degodia maintained close family, economic, and cultural ties across borders.

Today, the Degodia community continues to play a major role in politics, business, education, transportation, livestock trade, and public service throughout East Africa. Its influence is especially strong in northeastern Kenya, where it remains one of the most politically and economically influential Somali clans.

The Degodia are genealogically related to the other Samaale, but in particular to the Garjante, Gaalje'el, Garre, Masare, Isa (Saransor) and 'Awrmale, with which they share the same ancestor Gardhere Samaale.

== History ==
Around the early 1800s, the Degodia were forced to migrate away from their homeland to the right bank of the Shebelle River. They settled as tenants on Rahanweyn territory, paying a tribute for about a century and moving gradually closer to Lugh. The descendants of the original settlers eventually refused to pay tribute to the Rahanweyn, precipitating a war between the two. This ended through the intervention of Captain Bottego, who brokered peace in 1895 and concluded a treaty by which the Degodia declared themselves Italian subjects. When Arthur Donaldson Smith traveled through what is now Bare woreda in 1895, he found that the Degodia were neighbours of the Majertein Afgab clan - with whom they were at endless war - and their territory stretched east to the Weyib and Dawa Rivers.

To date, 12 Wabars have served the community:

1. Wabar Cuudow 2. Wabar Amiin 3. Wabar Ali 4. Wabar Omar 5. Wabar Caalin 6. Wabar Abdi 7. Wabar Omar 8. Wabar Ali 9. Wabar Hassan 10. Wabar Osman 11. Wabar Abdi 12. Wabar Abdille (incumbent)

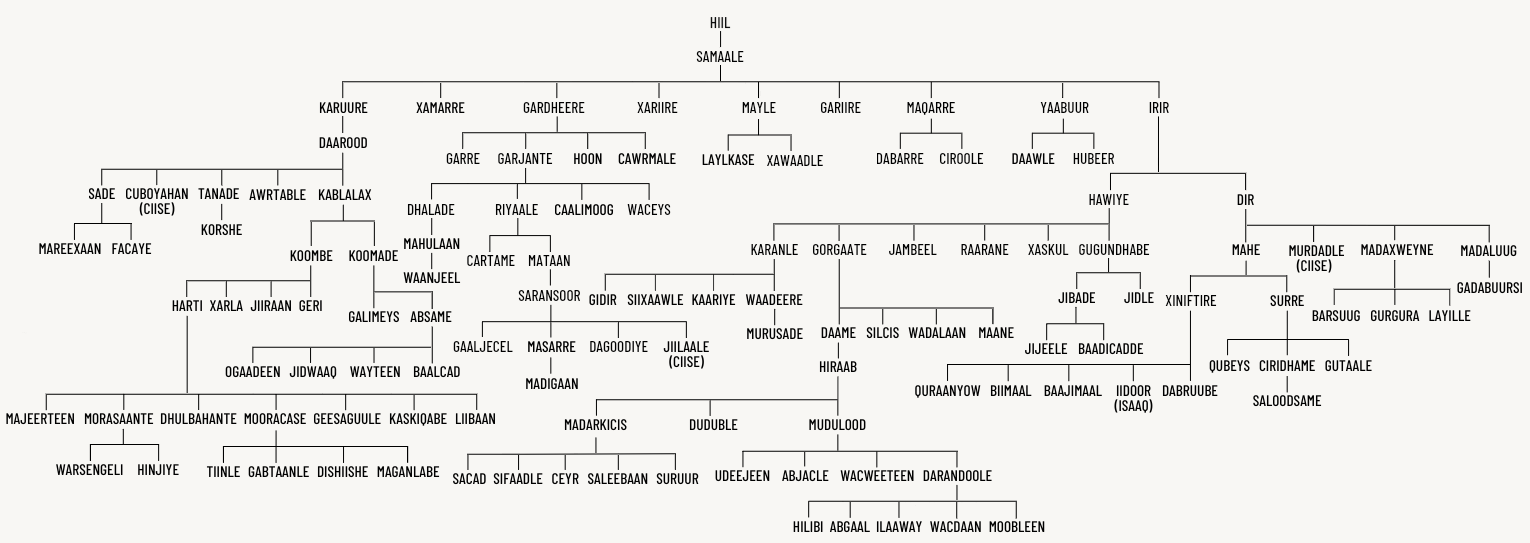
Genealogical tree of Somali clans

== Clan tree ==
The Max Planck Institute for Social Anthropology's Conflict analysis in Bakool and Bay, South-western Somalia (2004) shows the following clan tree for the Degoodi:

- Samaale

- Gardheere
  - Garjente
    - Adow
      - 'Owrmale
      - Garre
      - Saransoor
        - Degodia
        - Gaaljeel
        - Masaare
        - Isa

== Notable people ==
- Rahma Guliye, politician
