= Lugman Ismail Ali =

Somali politician

Lugman Ismail Ali لقمان اسماعيل علي

Minister of Labour and Social Affairs
- In office 17 January 2014 – 12 January 2015
- President: Hassan Sheikh Mohamud
- Prime Minister: Abdiweli Sheikh Ahmed
- Preceded by: Maryam Qaasim
- Succeeded by: Mohamed Omar Eymoy

Lugman Ismail Ali (Somali: Lugmaan Ismaaciil Cali, Arabic: لقمان اسماعيل علي) is a Somali politician. He was the Minister of Labour and Social Affairs of Somalia, having been appointed to the position on 17 January 2014 by Prime Minister Abdiweli Sheikh Ahmed. Lugman Ismail Ali succeeded Maryam Qaasim when her post as Minister for Human Development and Public Services ended on 17 January 2014. The Ministry was split to allow the creation of 6 cabinet positions one of which was the Ministry of Labour and Social Affairs. The other 5 cabinet positions are Ministry of Education, Ministry of Culture and Higher Education, Ministry of Health, Ministry of Women and Human Rights, Ministry of Sports and Youth. On 12 January 2015, Lugman Ismail Ali was succeeded by Mohamed Omar Eymoy.
