= Sheikh Osman Barre =

Somali politician

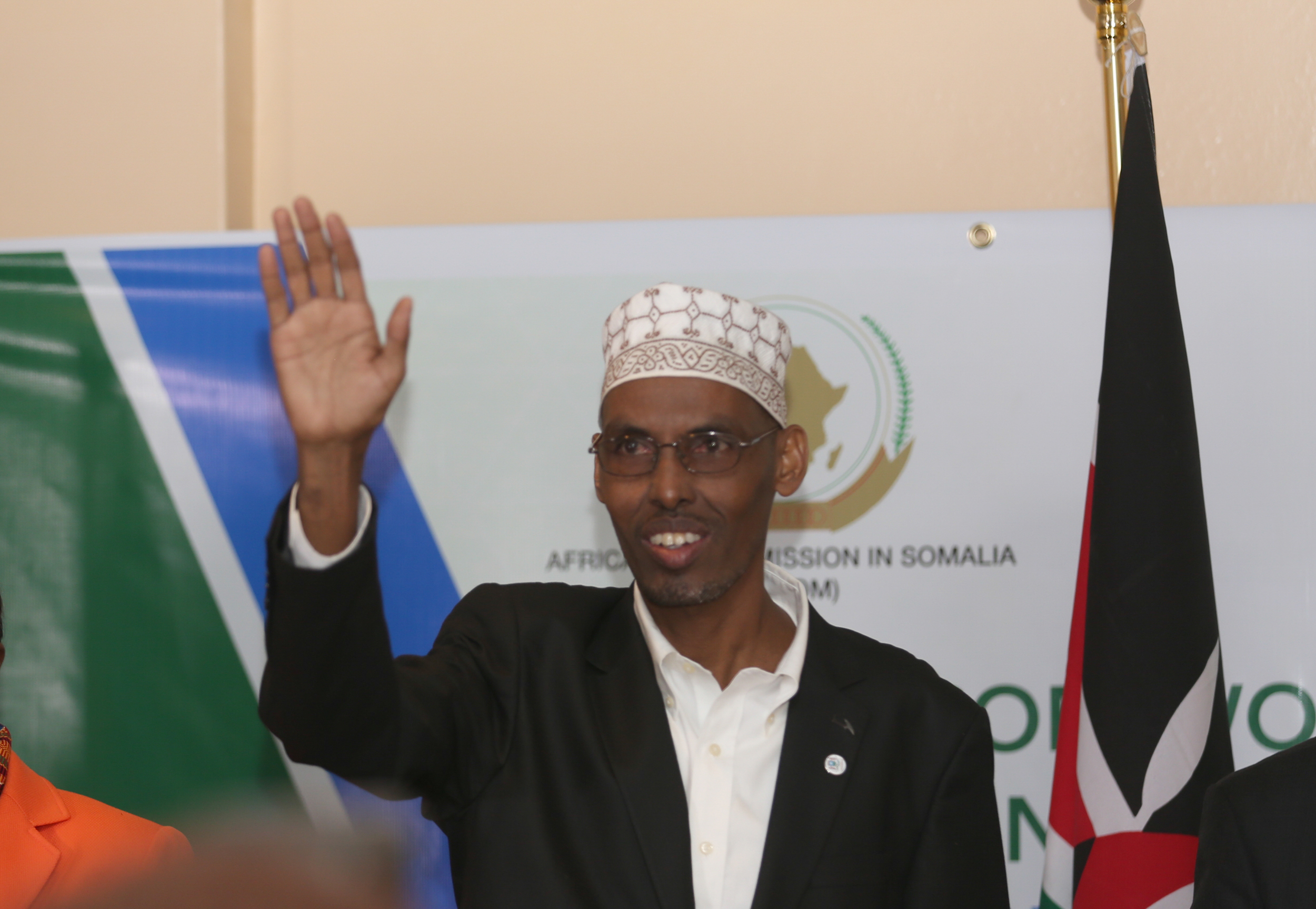

1st Speaker of Hirshabelle Parliament

Personal details
- Born: Osman Barre; May 15, 1969 (age 56) Baladwayne, Hiran Somalia.
- Political party: nonpartisan politician
- Education: MBA

Sheikh Osman Barre was the first speaker of parliament in Hirshabelle State of Somalia.
