= Mahamuud Garwayne =

Somali minister

Mahamud Abdi Ibraahim, also known as Dr Mahamud Garwayne, was the former Minister of Commerce, Trade and Investment in the government of Somali Prime Minister Farmaajo. His death was claimed by the al-Shabaab organization, who considered him to be a threat to their existence.
