= Mohamed Abdi Ware =

Somali politician; President of Hirshabelle from 2017 to 2020

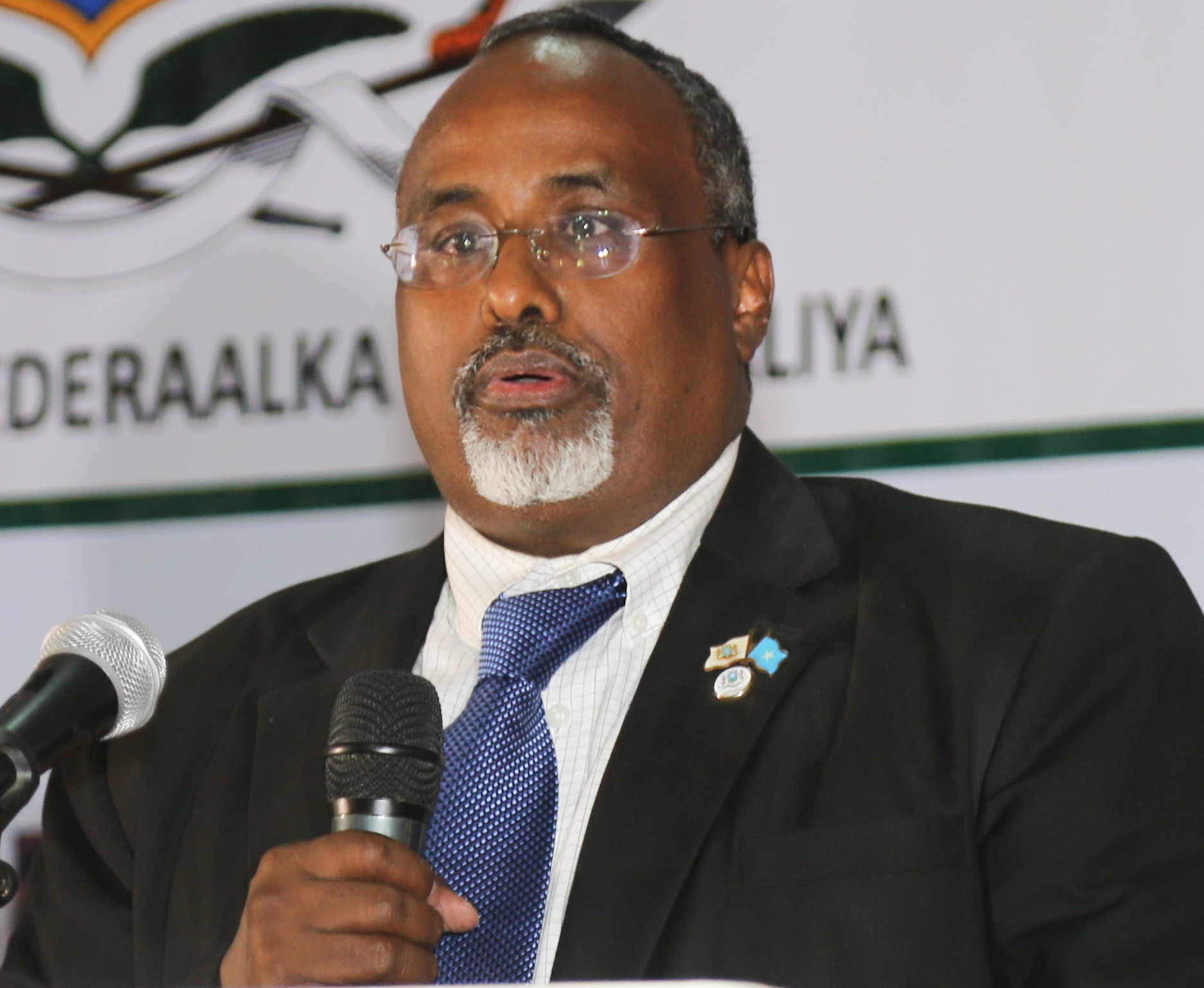
- Mohamed Abdi Ware in Jowhar on (2017)

President of Hirshabelle
- In office 16 September 2017 – 2 November 2020
- Vice President: Ali Abdullahi Hussein
- Preceded by: Ali Abdullahi Hussein (acting)
- Succeeded by: Ali Abdullahi Hussein

Personal details
- Born: 14 February 1960 (age 66) Jowhar, Trust Territory of Somaliland
- Education: Afgooye Agricultural High School; Indiana University Bloomington

Mohamed Abdi Ware (Somali: Maxamed Cabdi Waare; born 14 February 1960) is a Somali politician. He was the president of Hirshabelle from 16 September 2017 to 2 November 2020.

== Biography ==
Waare hails from the Yabar Madaxweyne sub-clan of Xawaadle, and was born in the Jowhar, Middle Shabelle which at that time in 1960 was part of Banadir region.

Mohamed Abdi Ware received his primary education in Halgan village in Bulo-Burte District, and completed his secondary education in Hodan District in Mogadishu. He went seminar to Indiana University Bloomington in the United States in 1985 for agricultural extension officer. He was one of the students who received project exchange training opportunity from the United States to boost the country's agricultural production.

He joined the government when he graduated from Afgooye Agricultural High School in 1979. He worked for the Ministry of Agriculture for 10 years, and was the agricultural coordinator for Middle Shabelle and Hiran regions. He worked with the Red Cross for 10 years after the collapse, especially during a time of insecurity and famine in the country. He worked with the United Nations Food and Agriculture Organization. He also worked briefly with UNDP, particularly the Transitional Federal Government (TFG) Reconstruction Project led by President Abdullahi Yusuf Ahmed.

According to Ware, his main tasks as president is to disarm and integrate local clan militias into the state security forces and the construction of the Cadale port and a dry port in Ferfer, Hiiraan.

During his 2018 presidential term, parliament planned his removal from office. Ware resigned on 2 November 2020.

== See also ==
- Somalia
- Politics of Somalia
- Lists of office-holders
