= Abdullaahi Faah =

Somalian politician (died 2011)

Abdullahi Moalim Mahamuud, also known as Abdullahi Faah, was a member of parliament of Transitional National Government of Somalia in Abdiqasim Salad Hassan's government from 2000 to 2004.

He died on March 28, 2011, in Nairobi, Kenya.
