= Osman Mohammud Dufle =

Somali physician and politician

Osman Mohammud Dufle عثمان محمود ضوفلآ
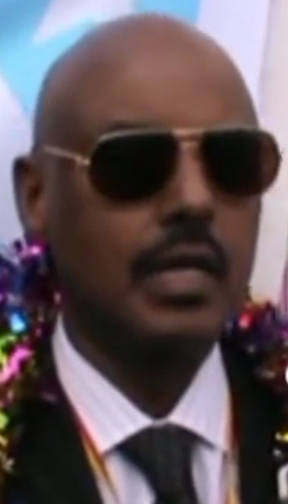

Minister of Health of Somalia
- In office 2000–2004

Personal details
- Born: Somalia
- Party: Transitional National Government

Osman Mohammud Dufle (Somali: Cismaan Maxamed Dufle, Arabic: عثمان محمود ضوفلآ) is a Somali physician and politician. He previously served as a Minister of Health in the Transitional National Government of Somalia. He was also one of the founders of the Joint Medical Committee, a professional organization for doctors in the country. He served as a volunteer at the Keysaney Hospital in Mogadishu. In June 2014, he was nominated for a Nobel Prize in recognition of his humanitarian work.
