= Abdihakim Luqman =

Somali politician

2nd Speaker of Hirshabelle Parliament
- Incumbent
- Assumed office November 4, 2020
- Preceded by: Sheikh Osman Barre

Personal details
- Born: Abdihakim Luqman Haji Muhumad; May 15, 1979 (age 47) Buloburde, Hiran, Somalia
- Party: nonpartisan politician
- Children: 3
- Education: International University of Africa Public health

Abdihakim Luqman is a Somali politician and current Speaker of Hirshabelle State Parliament.
