= Mohamed Abdullahi Hassan Noah =

Somali politician

Minister of Youth and Sports
- In office 6 February 2015 – 29 March 2017
- President: Hassan Sheikh Mohamud
- Prime Minister: Omar Abdirashid Ali Sharmarke
- Preceded by: Mohamed Omar Arte
- Succeeded by: Khadijo Mohamed Diriye

Personal details
- Born: Somalia
- Party: Independent

Mohamed Abdullahi Hassan Noah is a Somali politician. He is the former Minister of Youth and Sports of Somalia, having been appointed to the position on 6 February 2015 by former Prime Minister Omar Abdirashid Ali Sharmarke. He has now been succeeded by Salah Ahmed Jama.
