= Ali Gudlawe =

Somali politician

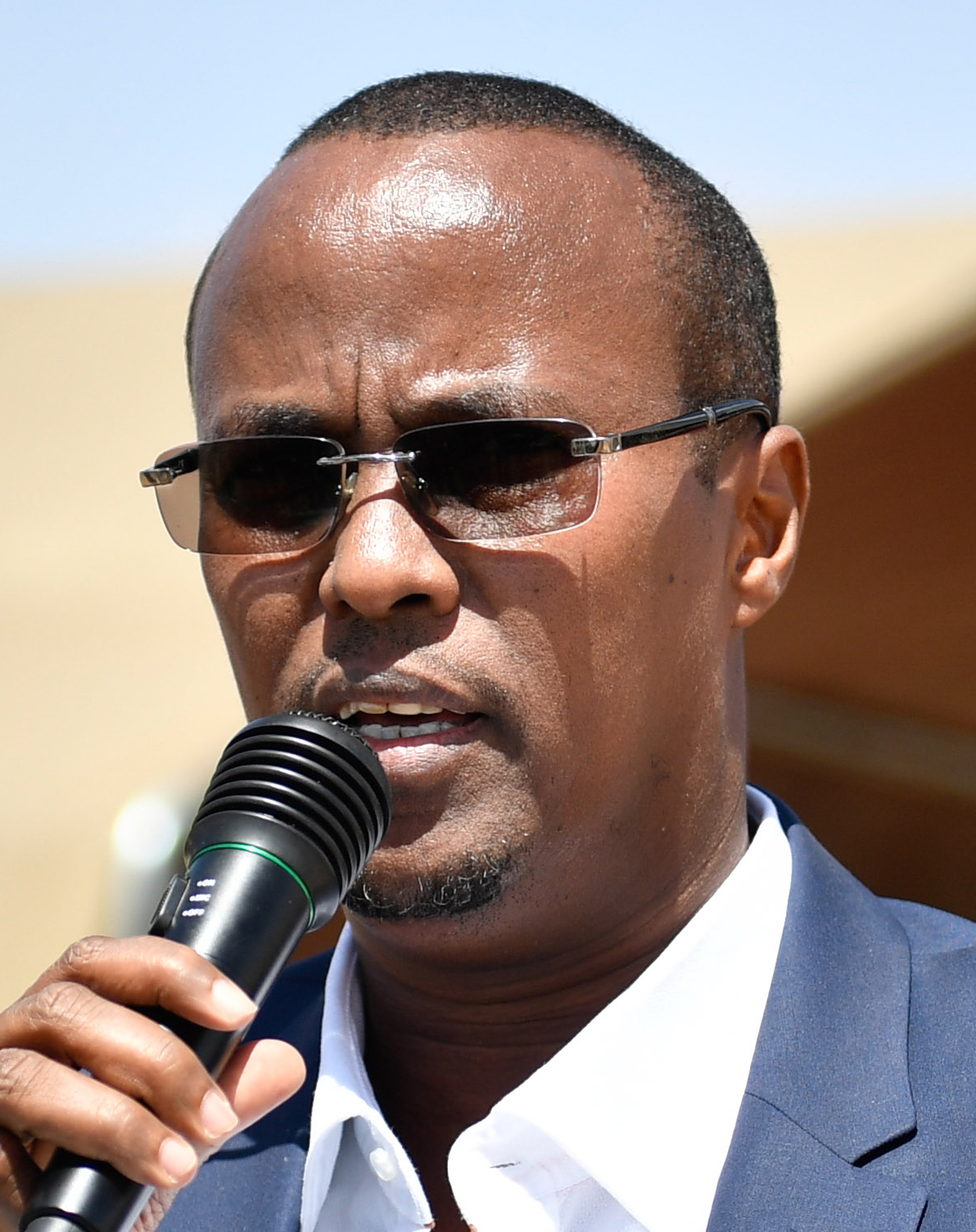

President of Hirshabelle
- Incumbent
- Assumed office 12 November 2020
- Preceded by: Mohamed Abdi Ware

Interim President of Hirshabelle
- In office 2 November 2020 – 12 December 2020
- Preceded by: Ali Abdullahi Osoble
- Succeeded by: Mohamed Abdi Ware
- In office 14 August 2017 – 16 September 2017

Personal details
- Born: Ali Abdullahi Hussein; December 14, 1973 (age 52) Mahaday District, Middle Shabelle, Somalia
- Party: Independent
- Education: Somali International University

Ali Abdullahi Hussein (Somali: Cali Cabdullaahi Xuseen Guudlaawe, born 1974), better known as Ali Guudlaawe, is a Somali politician who has served as the President of Hirshabelle from 12 November 2020.

== Biography ==
Gudlawe completed his primary and secondary education in Jowhar. Then he received his undergraduate degree from Somali International University. He previously served as the Chief of Finance of the Middle Shabelle Regional Administration, during the Mohamed Dheere Administration from 2001 to 2006. He served as the deputy governor of Middle Shabelle during the Transitional Federal Government from 2007 to 2009.

Gudlawe was the governor of Middle Shabelle region in 2014 and 2016 and the interim president of Hirshabelle State in 2017.

In October 2016, he was elected Vice President of Hirshabelle State, presided over newly recruited HirShabelle State Police, and protested against Somalis being held hostage in Libya.

He became the president of Hirshabelle State again in 2020. Of the 99 members of Parliament, 86 voted for Ali Gudlawe while 13 others voted for Abdirahman Jimale Osman.

Gudlawe was reelected to the state presidency for a second term in 2026 by a margin of 81 votes to 13. His opponent, Nur Ilmi Halane, belonged to the Ramaas political organization.
