= Mohamed Mukhtar Ibrahim =

Mohamed Mukhtar Ibrahim محمد مختار ابراهيم
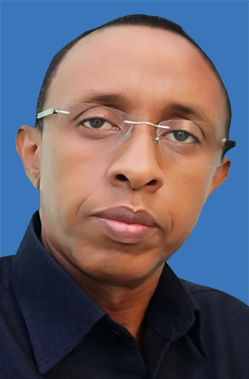

Minister of Petroleum and Mineral Resources
- In office 6 February 2015 – 29 March 2017

Personal details
- Born: Somalia
- Party: Independent

Mohamed Mukhtar Ibrahim is a development and business entrepreneurship specialist. He was the Minister of Petroleum and Mineral Resources of Somalia, having been appointed to the position on 6 February 2015 by the now former Prime Minister Omar Abdirashid Ali Sharmarke.

Prior to his ministerial position, Mohamed served in various capacities with the Ministry of Petroleum and Mineral Resources, Ministry of National Security and Office of the President. Before joining the public sector, Mohamed was an accredited business adviser and worked on diverse programs with private and nonprofit institutions.
