= Samaale =

Legendary forefather of Somali clans

Samaale, also spelled Samali or Samale (Somali: Samaale) is traditionally considered to be the common forefather of several major Somali clans and their respective sub-clans. His name is the source of the ethnonym Somali.

As the purported ancestor of most pastoralist clans living in the northern part of Somalia, Samaale lies at the basis of the largest and most widespread Somali lineage (the second largest lineage belonging to Samaale's brother Sab, the purported progenitor of most southern, cultivating clans). The main branches of the Samaale clan are the Dir, the Hawiye, the Isaaq, the Darod, and the 'pre-Hawiya' group (containing the Gardere, the Yakabur, and the Mayle).

Both the Samaale and the Sab claim to be ultimately descended from the Arab clan of the Quraysh through Aqil ibn Abi Talib (c. 580 – 670 or 683), a cousin of the Islamic prophet Muhammad and older brother of Ali. Although these claims of descent are historically untenable, they do reflect the longstanding cultural contacts between Somalia (especially, though not exclusively, its most northern part Somaliland) and Southern Arabia.

== History ==
The progenitor Samaale is generally regarded as the source of the ethnonym Somali. Others state that the word Somali is derived from the words soo and maal, which together mean "go and milk"—a reference to the ubiquitous pastoralism of the Somali people. Another etymology proposes that the term Somali is derived from the Arabic for "wealthy" (zāwamāl), again referring to Somali riches in livestock.

Just like the descendants of the other main Somali clan progenitor Sab, the clans tracing their lineage to Samaale claim that their forefather was himself a descendant of the Arab Banu Hashim clan (a sub-clan of the Quraysh), through Aqil ibn Abi Talib, a cousin of the prophet Muhammad and older brother of Ali. According to the British anthropologist and Somali Studies veteran Ioan M. Lewis, the traditions of descent from noble Arab families related to Muhammad embraced by most Somali clans are most probably figurative expressions of the importance of Islam in Somali society. Likewise, Sada Mire regards the foundation of Somali clan lineages by Arab progenitors as part of "the Somali Islamic myth of origin".

The paternal genetics of ethnic Somalis are inconsistent with a post-Islamic common TMRCA (time to most recent common ancestor) and with a post-Islamic paternal Arabian origin for the majority of the ethnicity. The majority of Somalis have a TMRCA between 4,000-2,000 years before present in the Bronze Age.

== Genealogy ==
The claimed descent of Samaale from the Banu Hashim is as follows: Samaale was the son of Hill, the son of Muhammad Yow, the son of Muhammad Abd al-Rahman, the son of Aqil, the son of Abu Talib (paternal uncle of the prophet Muhammad), the son of Abd al-Muttalib (paternal grandfather of Muhammad).

Samaale's father Hill is also thought of as the father of Sab, the progenitor of most southern Somali clans (most notably the Rahanweyn).

Constructing and reconstructing genealogical tables according to changing political and economical alliances is an important part of Somali culture, epitomized by the saying tol waa tolane, meaning 'clan is something joined together'. One of multiple possible tables used by scholars to sketch the main outlines of Somali clan genealogy is as follows:

- Hill
  - Samaale
    - Irir
      - Dir
        - Gadabursi
        - Issa
        - Samaroon
        - Bimaal
      - Isaaq
        - Habr Magaadleeh
          - Garhaji
          - Awal
        - Habr Habusheed
          - Habr Yunis
          - Tol Ja'lo (Ahmed)
      - Hawiye
        - Gurreh
        - Ajuran
        - Mobilen
        - Habr Gedir
        - Sheikhaal
        - Abgaal
    - Gardere–Yakabur–Mayle
    - Darod
      - Ogadeen
      - Harti
        - Majeerteen
        - Warsangeli
        - Dhulbahante
      - Marehan
  - Sab (non-Samaale)
    - Digil
      - Tunni
      - Rahanweyn
        - Siyyeed
        - Sagaal

== See also ==
- Demographics of Somalia
